= Stupida sfortuna =

2026 single by Fulminacci

Single by Fulminacci

from the album Calcinacci
- Released: 25 February 2026
- Genre: Indie pop
- Length: 2:55
- Label: Maciste Dischi; Warner Music Italy
- Songwriters: Filippo Uttinacci; Pietro Paroletti
- Producer: Golden Years

Fulminacci singles chronology
"Niente di particolare" (2025)	"Stupida sfortuna" (2026)

Music video
- "Stupida sfortuna" on YouTube

"Stupida sfortuna" (transl. "Stupid bad luck") is a song written and recorded by Italian singer-songwriter Fulminacci, released on 25 February 2026 as a single from his fourth studio album, Calcinacci.

The song was presented in competition during the Sanremo Music Festival 2026, held between 24 and 28 February 2026, where it eventually placed 7th among the final ranking and won the Mia Martini Critics' Award.

== Composition ==
The song was written by Fulminacci together with Pietro Paroletti, with the latter producing the track under the pseudonym Golden Years. In an interview with Rockol, the singer explained the meaning of the song and its composition, relating it to the song "Santa Marinella", which competed at the Sanremo Music Festival 2021:

“I didn’t write the song thinking about Sanremo, even though Sanremo is mentioned in the lyrics. When I decided to participate and therefore submit my candidacy, I chose this song because I thought it could be enhanced there. [...] It’s a piece that was already conceived as orchestral; it has a vintage sound and approach. [...] I like the part where I talk about the metro, because it’s a place I frequent a lot. I often get around by metro and, when the places I need to reach allow it, I see a lot of people there. In the lyrics there’s a line that says, ‘the metro wind blows, and that icy gust that hits you before the train arrives.’ I’ve been there many times, for many days, with my headphones on listening to music, and it says a lot about who I am. [It describes] a kind of solitude very different [from Santa Marinella], certainly more mature, because I’ve lived, I’ve made mistakes and suffered, I’ve laughed and experienced more. There may be a little more disillusionment, but at the same time I’m also a bit more focused as a person, so I know better who I am and what I want to represent.”

== Music video ==
The music video for "Stupida sfortuna", directed by Bendo, a duo composed of Andrea Santaterra and Lorenzo Silvestri, premiered on 25 February 2026 via Maciste Dischi's YouTube channel, together with the song release.

== Promotion ==
Italian broadcaster RAI organised the 76th edition of the Sanremo Music Festival between 24 and 28 February 2026. On 30 November 2025, Fulminacci was announced among the participants of the festival, with the title of his competing entry revealed the following 14 December.

Fulminacci performed the song on the first, second, and final nights of the festival. On the first night, 24 February, he performed in position 14 and ranked 2nd according to the press jury among a field of 30 participants. On the second night, "Stupida sfortuna" was performed in position 12; it ranked 2nd with the radio jury, 6th in the televoting, and 6th overall among the 15 competing songs. After two nights, the song stood 10th overall. On the final night, Fulminacci performed in position 23, placing 2nd with the radio jury, 1st with the press jury, and 9th in the televoting, ultimately ranking 6th for that night. Ultimately, combining results from all nights, the song finished 7th overall among a field of 30 participants.

During the final night, it was announced that Fulminacci and "Stupida sfortuna" had won the Mia Martini Critics' Award, receiving 26 out of 102 votes — 9 more than second-place Ermal Meta's "Stella stellina" and 15 more than third-place Levante's "Sei tu".

== Charts ==
Chart performance for "Stupid sfortuna"
Chart (2026)	Peak position
Italy (FIMI)	5
Italy Airplay (EarOne)	7

== Certifications ==
Certifications for "Stupida sfortuna"
Region	Certification	Certified units/sales
Italy (FIMI)	Platinum	200,000^{‡}
^{‡} Sales+streaming figures based on certification alone.
