= Gianluca Gazzoli =

Italian radio personality, television presenter and YouTuber (born 1988)

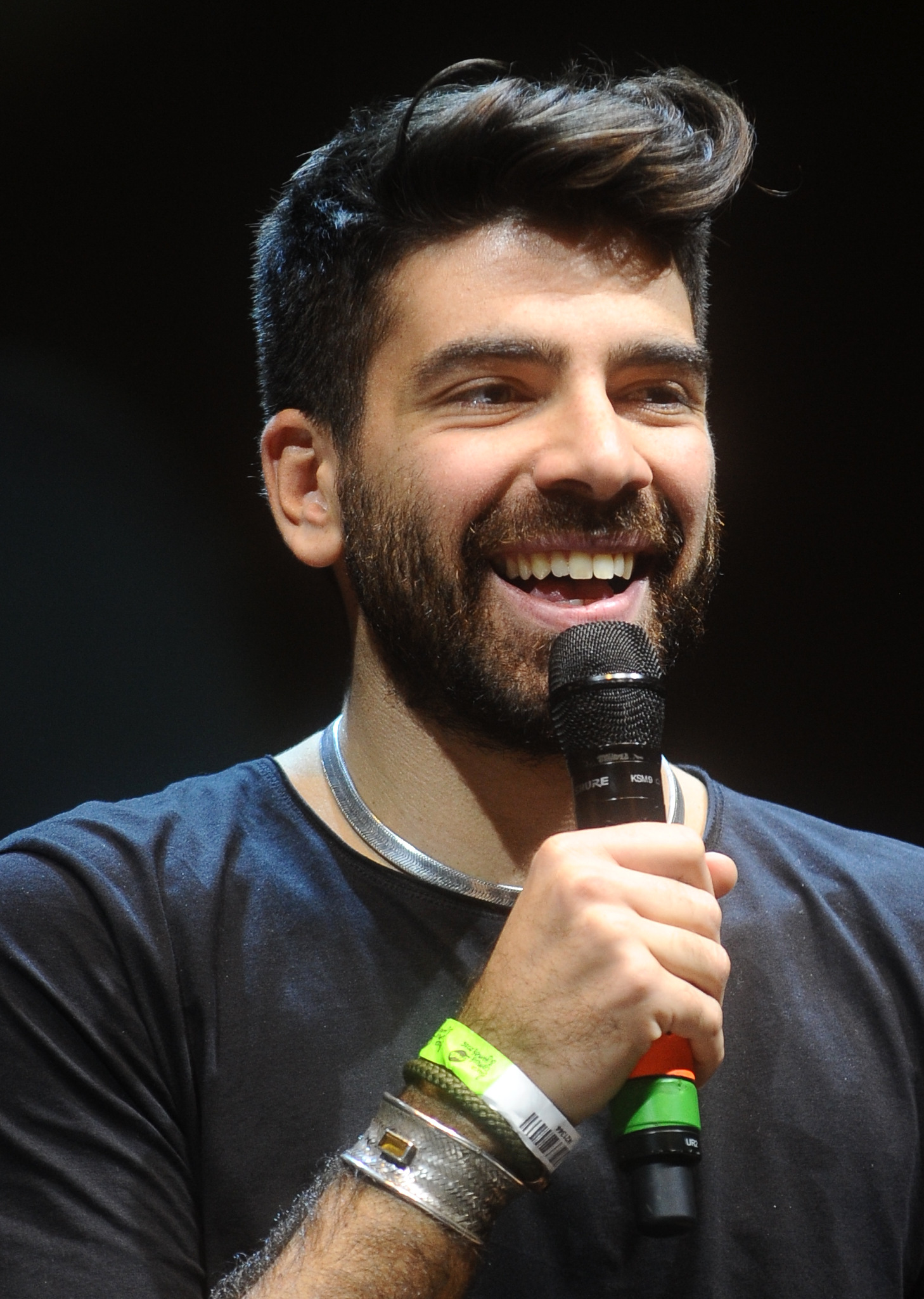
- Gianluca Gazzoli at Lucca Comics & Games 2016
- Born: 18 August 1988 (age 37); Vigevano, Lombardy, Italy
- Occupations: Radio personality; television presenter; YouTuber
- Years active: 2014–present
- Height: 1.90 m (6 ft 3 in)

Gianluca Gazzoli (born 18 August 1988) is an Italian radio personality, television presenter and YouTuber.

== Life and career ==
Born in Vigevano and raised in Cologno Monzese, both in the region of Lombardy, he began his career in tourist villages, before landing on Radio Number One, a historic station in Northern Italy, in 2014. At the same time, he decided to focus on producing videos for YouTube. He then moved to national radio, becoming the voice of Rai Radio 2. He has several credits under his belt: The Voice (2016), Quelli che... il calcio (2017–2018), and Domenica in. In 2017, he hosted the live broadcast of the Sanremo Music Festival for Rai Radio 2 in February, alongside Andrea Delogu and Gianfranco Monti.

In July 2018 he joined Ema Stokholma in commentating on Tomorrowland on Rai 4. In autumn 2018 he hosted Quelli che... A Radio 2 with Tamara Donà, a radio spin-off of the historic TV programme Quelli che... il calcio.

In the 2018–19 season he was the face of the program Dalle2alle5, later Dalle2alle4, live every afternoon on DeeJay TV.

After his television debut, in January 2019 he left Radio Rai to move to Radio DeeJay to host the weekend night show Gente della notte, moving the following year to the afternoon slot with Megajay, broadcast on Saturdays and Sundays on Radio DeeJay.

In 2021, during the week of the Sanremo Music Festival, he hosted the second edition of Guess the Artist, a program during which, locked in a car, he had to guess - through clues and by asking questions - the Sanremo singer he would interview. In the same year, he was among the voice actors of the animated film Space Jam: New Legends, wrote the book Scosse. La mia vita a cuore libero, published by Mondadori, and hosted Basket Zone, an in-depth program on the Italian basketball championship broadcast on DMAX.

At the end of 2021, he created Basement (BSMT) and the following year launched the podcast Passa dal BSMT, which, within a few months, became one of the most relevant formats in Italy. In 2023, he won the award for best podcast at the Best Movies Awards. In July 2024, at the Italian Podcast Awards, he won the award for best podcast in the Talk category. The following October, he received the Pegaso award from the Tuscany region. Also in 2024, at the Top Creator Awards, he received the award for best podcast from Forbes magazine.

Since 2023, after hosting GG Show for a few months, always on weekends, he joined the daily schedule of Radio DeeJay with Gazzology, on air at 8 pm from Monday to Friday. In the 2023 edition he hosts the Ante Factor of X Factor, broadcast on Sky and Now.

From 11 November to 14 December 2025, Gazzoli hosted the 19th edition of the Sanremo Giovani competition (which selects emerging artists for the Sanremo Music Festival) on Rai 2, being supported by Carlo Conti during the final evening. He joined Conti and Laura Pausini in presenting the Newcomers' section of the Festival proper.

== Television programs ==
Year	Title	Network		Role
2014	RDS Academy	Sky Uno		Competitor
2018	Tomorrowland	Rai 4		Commentator
2018	Quelli che... il calcio	Rai 2		Envoy
2018	Quelli che	Rai 2		Host
2018	Dalle2alle5	DeeJay TV		Host
2019	Dalle2alle4	DeeJay TV		Host
2021	Guess The Artist	Real Time	Nove	Host
2021	Basket Zone	DMAX		Host
2022	Nudi per la vita	Rai 2		Competitor
2023–2024	Ante Factor	Sky Uno	Now	Host
2025	Sanremo Giovani	Rai 2		Host
2025	Sanremo Music Festival	Rai 1		Co-host

== Radio ==
Year	Title	Network
2014–2016	Al volante	Radio Number One
2016	The Voice of Italy	Rai Radio 2
2016	I migliori anni	Rai Radio 2
2016	Refresh Summer	Rai Radio 2
2016–2018	KGG	Rai Radio 2
2017	Sanremo Music Festival	Rai Radio 2
2017	Sanremo Giovani	Rai Radio 2
2018	Quelli che	Rai Radio 2
2019	Gente della notte	Radio DeeJay
2020–2023	Megajay	Radio DeeJay
2023	GGShow	Radio DeeJay
2023–present	Gazzology	Radio DeeJay

== Filmography ==
=== Voice actor ===
Year	Title	Director
2021	Space Jam: A New Legacy	Malcolm D. Lee

== Podcast ==
Year	Title
2022	Deejay Showtime
2022–present	Passa dal BSMT

== Theater ==
Year	Title
2025	Passa dal BSMT - dal vivo

== Works ==
- Gazzoli, Gianluca (2021). Scosse. La mia vita a cuore libero. Mondadori. ISBN 9788804739753.
- Gianluca Gazzoli (2024). Anche quando nessuno ci crede. Mondadori. ISBN 9788804792420.
