= Giorgia =

Giorgia is the Italian version of the female name Georgia. Notable people with the name include:

== Arts and entertainment ==
- Giorgia (singer) (born 1971), Italian singer, born Giorgia Todrani
- Giorgia Cardinaletti (born 1987), Italian journalist and television presenter
- Giorgia Fumanti (born 1975), Italian-Canadian soprano and singer of operatic pop
- Giorgia Gianetiempo (born 1996), Italian actress, singer and model
- Giorgia Gueglio (born 1973), Italian singer
- Giorgia Moll (born 1938), Italian actress
- Giorgia Palmas (born 1982), Italian television personality
- Giorgia Surina (born 1975), Italian television personality
- Giorgia Whigham (born 1997), American actress
- Giorgia Würth (born 1981), Swiss-Italian actress

== Sports people ==
- Giorgia Apollonio (born 1988), Italian curler
- Giorgia Benecchi (born 1989), Italian pole vaulter
- Giorgia Bronzini (born 1983), Italian professional racing cyclist
- Giorgia Carrossa (born 1986), Italian figure skater
- Giorgia Cesarini (born 2002), Sammarinese archer
- Giorgia Collomb (born 2006), Italian World Cup alpine ski racer
- Giorgia Motta (born 1984), Italian footballer
- Giorgia Villa (born 2003), Italian artistic gymnast

== Other people ==
- Giorgia Andreuzza (born 1973), Italian politician
- Giorgia Andriani, Italian model, actress and dancer
- Giorgia Cardinaletti (born 1987), Italian journalist and television presenter
- Giorgia Meloni (born 1977), Italian politician
- Giorgia Soleri (born 1996), Italian model, author and activist

== See also ==
- Giorgia (moth), a genus of moths
