= Avvoltoi =

2026 single by Eddie Brock

Single by Eddie Brock

from the album Amarsi è la rivoluzione (Deluxe)
- Released: 25 February 2026
- Length: 2:45
- Label: Warner
- Composers: Edoardo Iaschi; Vincenzo Leone
- Lyricists: Edoardo Iaschi; Lorenzo Iaschi; Vincenzo Leone
- Producer: Vince Lion

Eddie Brock singles chronology
"Non è mica te" (2025)	"Avvoltoi" (2026)

"Avvoltoi" ("Vultures") is a song co-written and recorded by Italian singer Eddie Brock, released on 25 February 2026 through Warner Music Italy. The song was presented in competition during the Sanremo Music Festival 2026, finishing in 30th and last place.

== Music video ==
The music video for "Avvoltoi", directed by Daniele Tofani, was published in conjunction with the release of the song through Eddie Brock's YouTube channel.

== Promotion ==
Italian broadcaster RAI organised the 76th edition of the Sanremo Music Festival between 24 and 28 February 2026. On 30 November 2025, Brock was announced among the participants of the festival, with the title of his competing entry revealed the following 14 December.

== Charts ==
Chart performance for "Avvoltoi"
Chart (2026)	Peak position
Italy (FIMI)	21
Italy Airplay (EarOne)	50
