= Labirinto =

2026 single by Luchè

Single by Luchè

from the album Il mio lato peggiore
- Language: Italian
- English title: Labrynth
- Released: 25 February 2026
- Genre: Hip-hop; alternative hip-hop
- Length: 3:48
- Label: Atlantic; Warner
- Composers: Davide Petrella; Stefano Tognini; Rosario Castagnola
- Lyricists: Luca Imprudente; Davide Petrella
- Producer: Cripo

Luchè singles chronology
"Nessuna" (2025)	"Labirinto" (2026)

"Labirinto" ("Labrynth") is a song co-written and recorded by Italian rapper Luchè. It was released on 25 February 2026 though Atlantic and Warner Music Italy as the fourth single from his sixth studio album, Il mio lato peggiore.

The song was presented in competition during the Sanremo Music Festival 2026.

== Music video ==
The music video for "Labirinto", directed by Lorenzo Sorbini and Onira and produced by Oceancode Studio, was published in conjunction with the release of the song, through the rapper's YouTube channel.

== Promotion ==
Italian broadcaster RAI organised the 76th edition of the Sanremo Music Festival between 24 and 28 February 2026. On 30 November 2025, Fedez and Masini were announced among the participants of the festival, with the title of their competing entry revealed the following 14 December.

== Charts ==
Chart (2026)	Peak position
Italy (FIMI)	8
Italy Airplay (EarOne)	44

== Certifications ==
Certifications for "Labirinto"
Region	Certification	Certified units/sales
Italy (FIMI)	Gold	100,000^{‡}
^{‡} Sales+streaming figures based on certification alone.
