= Male necessario =

2026 single by Fedez and Marco Masini

Single by Fedez and Marco Masini

from the album Perfetto imperfetto
- Language: Italian
- English title: Necessary evil
- Released: 25 February 2026
- Genre: Pop rap
- Length: 3:07
- Label: Warner
- Composers: Alessandro La Cava; Federica Abbate; Nicola Lazzarin
- Lyricists: Federico Leonardo Lucia; Marco Masini; Alessandro La Cava; Federica Abbate; Antonio Iammarino
- Producer: Cripo

Fedez singles chronology
"Telepaticamente" (2025)	"Male necessario" (2026)

Marco Masini singles chronology
"E poi ti ho visto cadere" (2026)	"Male necessario" (2026)

"Male necessario" (Italian: [ˈmaːle netʃesˈsaːrjo]; "Necessary evil") is a song co-written and recorded by Italian rapper Fedez and Italian singer Marco Masini. It was released on 25 February 2026 through Warner Music Italy as the fourth single from Masini's thirteenth studio album, Perfetto imperfetto.

The song competed at the Sanremo Music Festival 2026, where it came 5th and was awarded for best lyrics.

== Music video ==
The music video for "Male necessario", directed by Alessandro Della Giusta, was released alongside the song's release on the singers' YouTube channel.

== Promotion ==
Italian broadcaster RAI aired the 76th edition of the Sanremo Music Festival between 24 and 28 February 2026. On 30 November 2025, Fedez and Masini were announced as participants in the festival, while the title of their competing entry was revealed the following 14 December.

== Charts ==
Chart (2026)	Peak position
Italy (FIMI)	1
Italy Airplay (EarOne)	3
Switzerland (Schweizer Hitparade)	46

== Certifications ==
Certifications for "Male necessario"
Region	Certification	Certified units/sales
Italy (FIMI)	Gold	100,000^{‡}
^{‡} Sales+streaming figures based on certification alone.
