= Tu mi piaci tanto =

2026 song by Sayf

Single by Sayf

from the album Santissimo
- Language: Italian
- Released: 25 February 2026
- Genre: Urban pop; dance; folk
- Length: 3:29
- Label: La Santa; Atlantic; Warner
- Composers: Luca Di Blasi; Giorgio De Lauri
- Lyricist: Adam Sayf Viacava
- Producers: Dibla; Jiz

Sayf singles chronology
"Money" (2025)	"Tu mi piaci tanto" (2026)	"Buona domenica" (2026)

"Tu mi piaci tanto" (Italian pronunciation: [ˈtu mmi ˈpjaːtʃi ˈtanto]; "I Really Like You") is a song co-written and recorded by Italian rapper and singer Sayf, released on 25 February 2026 through La Santa, Atlantic and Warner Music Italy. The song competed in the Sanremo Music Festival 2026, coming in second place.

== Background ==
"Tu mi piaci tanto" was written by Sayf, Giorgio "Jiz" De Lauri and Luca "Dibla" Di Blasi, with De Lauri and Di Blasi also serving as producers. The song marked Sayf's debut at the Sanremo Music Festival. In an interview given to RaiPlay, Sayf described "Tu mi piaci tanto" as "[similar to] the other songs [he] wrote." He thinks of it as "a snapshot of the moment, and so it captures a bit of everything around it, both on a personal and social level. Love is also there, because love is a constant, but not just an end in itself; it's rather used as a tool for description."

The song has a contemporary sound, and combines rap and singer-songwriter elements, using references to politics, events, sports and popular culture – including the 2023 Emilia-Romagna floods, Silvio Berlusconi, Fabio Cannavaro and Luigi Tenco – to describe today's Italian society. The lyrics alternate ironic and lighthearted wit with critical and disenchanted observations, highlighting, among other things, the relationship between citizens and institutions in the face of dissent and protest.

== Music video ==
The music video for "Tu mi piaci tanto", directed by Giulio Cocco, was published alongside the release of the song through Sayf's YouTube channel.

== Promotion ==
Italian broadcaster RAI organised the 76th edition of the Sanremo Music Festival between 24 and 28 February 2026. On 30 November 2025, Sayf was announced among the participants of the festival, with the title of his competing entry revealed the following 14 December.

== Charts ==
Chart performance for "Tu mi piaci tanto"
Chart (2026)	Peak position
Global Excl. US (Billboard)	136
Italy (FIMI)	2
Italy Airplay (EarOne)	1
Switzerland (Schweizer Hitparade)	37

== Certifications ==
Certifications for "Tu mi piaci tanto"
Region	Certification	Certified units/sales
Italy (FIMI)	Platinum	200,000^{‡}
^{‡} Sales+streaming figures based on certification alone.
