= Sanremo Music Festival 2026 =

Italian song contest (76th edition)

- Tutti cantano Sanremo

Dates and venue
- Semi-final 1: 24 February 2026
- Semi-final 2: 25 February 2026
- Semi-final 3: 26 February 2026
- Semi-final 4: 27 February 2026
- Final: 28 February 2026
- Venue: Teatro Ariston; Sanremo, Italy

Production
- Broadcaster: Radiotelevisione italiana (RAI)
- Director: Maurizio Pagnussat
- Musical director: Pinuccio Pirazzoli
- Artistic director: Carlo Conti
- Presenters: Carlo Conti and Laura Pausini with Can Yaman (Big Artists section, first night) Achille Lauro, Lillo and Pilar Fogliati (Big Artists section, second night) Irina Shayk and Ubaldo Pantani (Big Artists section, third night) Bianca Balti and Alessandro Siani (Big Artists section, fourth night) Giorgia Cardinaletti and Nino Frassica (Big Artists section, fifth night) Gianluca Gazzoli (Newcomers' section)

Big Artists section
- Number of entries: 30
- Voting system: Televote, press jury and radio jury
- Winner: "Per sempre sì" Sal Da Vinci

Newcomers' section
- Number of entries: 4
- Voting system: Televote, press jury and radio jury
- Winner: "Laguna"; Nicolò Filippucci

The Sanremo Music Festival 2026 (Italian: Festival di Sanremo 2026), officially the 76th Italian Song Festival (76º Festival della canzone italiana), was the 76th edition of the annual Sanremo Music Festival, a television song contest held in the Teatro Ariston of Sanremo, organised and broadcast by Radiotelevisione italiana (RAI). It was held between 24 and 28 February 2026, and was presented by Carlo Conti – who also served as the artistic director for the competition – and singer Laura Pausini. The festival was won by Sal Da Vinci with "Per sempre sì", earning him the right to represent Italy in the Eurovision Song Contest 2026.

== Format ==
Teatro Ariston on the second night of the 2026 Festival

The 2026 edition of the Sanremo Music Festival took place at the Teatro Ariston in Sanremo, Liguria, organised by the Italian public broadcaster RAI. Due to the 2026 Winter Olympics and Paralympics being held in Italy between 6–22 February and 6–15 March 2026, respectively, the festival took place in the last week of February 2026. The complete rules were published on 16 October 2025.

=== Legal dispute over RAI's role ===
In December 2024, the regional administrative court (TAR) of Liguria ruled that the municipality of Sanremo could not directly appoint RAI as the organiser of the event, and that, starting in 2026, a public bid must be held in order to determine the organising company. Two months later, RAI appealed the ruling, arguing that "[RAI's] branding is inseparable from the [festival's] format"; however, the Council of State would later uphold the TAR's decision in May 2025. Despite a unilateral proposal forwarded by RAI, the municipality followed the TAR ruling and published a public tender on 9 April 2025, with broadcasters being able to apply within 40 days. Ultimately, the only applicant was RAI, and, following the ruling of the Council of State, negotiations began between the broadcaster and the Sanremo municipality to define the terms of the new contract. RAI and Sanremo, however, kept clashing over the ownership of the festival's brand, with the broadcaster setting a deadline of 1 August 2025, after which it would organize the contest as Festival della Canzone Rai ("RAI Song Festival") in a different location. The possible choices included Naples, Turin, Milan, Viareggio and Rimini. It was later reported that the parties had reached an agreement to keep the contest in Sanremo.

=== Presenters ===
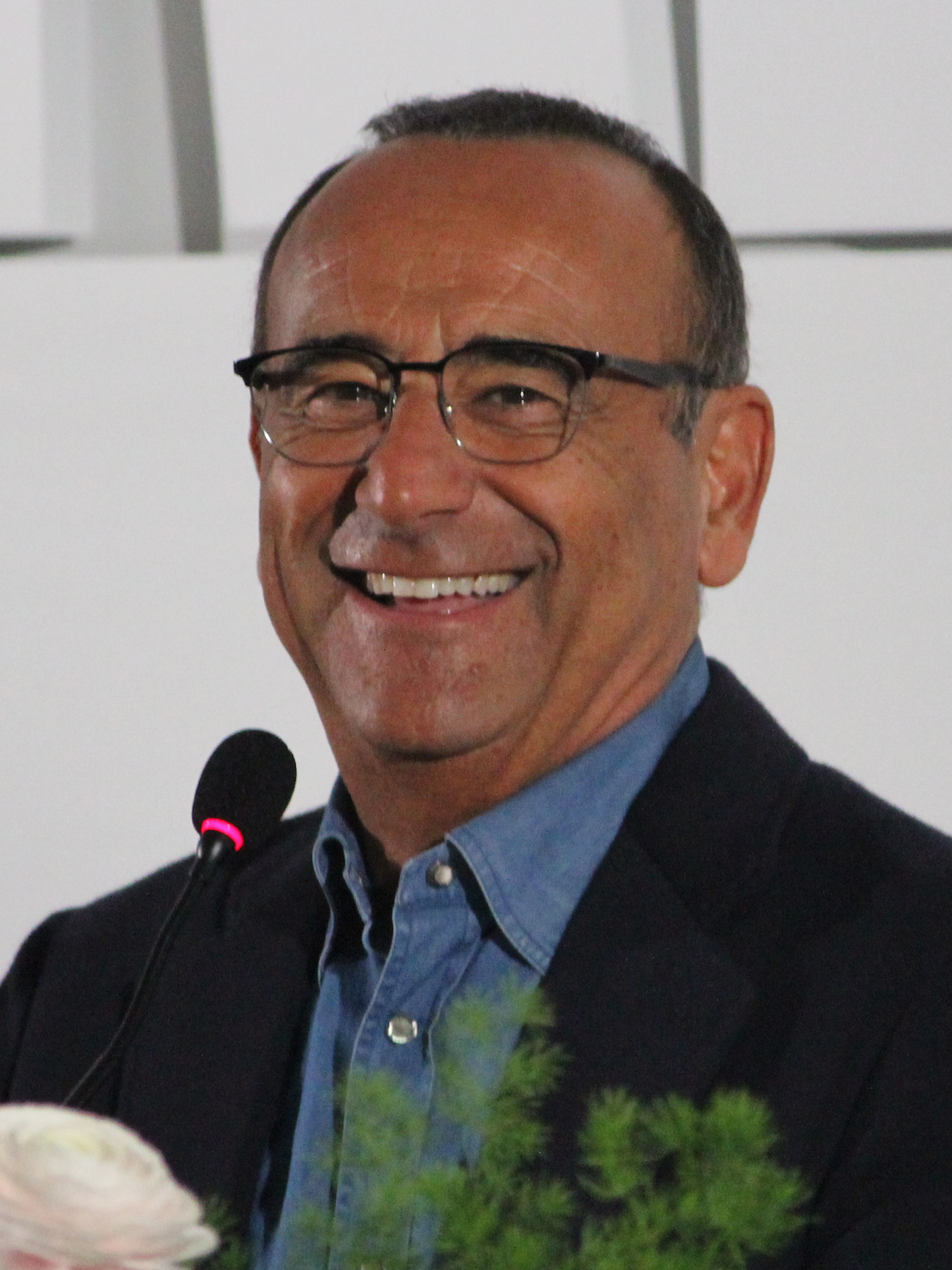
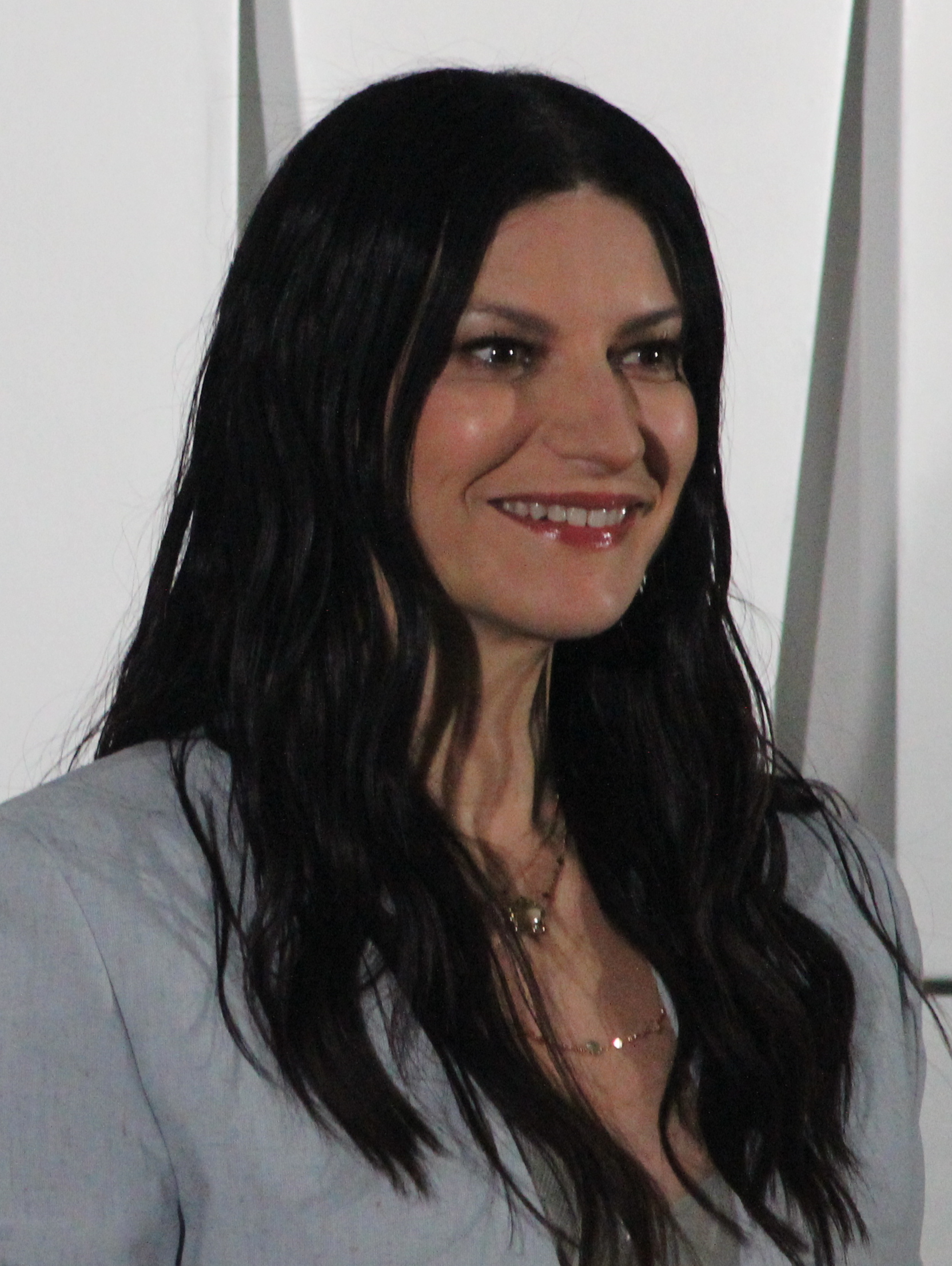
Carlo Conti and Laura Pausini, main hosts of Sanremo 2026

On 22 May 2024, RAI announced Carlo Conti – who had previously taken on the role in 2015, 2016 and 2017 – as the artistic director and main host of the 2025 and 2026 editions. Following the 2025 edition, Conti confirmed his position as artistic director and possible host for the 2026 festival.

In late October 2025, Conti announced that the special DopoFestival broadcast after each of the shows would be hosted by Nicola Savino. In mid-December, the complete lineup for the side broadcasts was announced, with Enrico Cremonesi, Aurora Leone and Federico Basso alongside Savino; Daniele Battaglia on the external "Suzuki Stage"; Ema Stokholma, Carolina Rey and Manola Moslehi hosting the opening PrimaFestival segment; and Gianluca Gazzoli co-hosting the Newcomers' competition after serving as the main presenter for the pre-selection.

The following month, Laura Pausini was revealed to be the co-host for all the nights of the festival, while at the end of January Conti added Achille Lauro as a co-host for the second night and in February Can Yaman as co-host of the first night, Lillo of the second and Andrea Pucci of the fourth; Pucci renounced his role shortly after, amid accusations of racism and homophobia as well as insults and criticism over his political sympathies. Italian actress Pilar Fogliati co-hosted the second night, Russian supermodel Irina Shayk and Italian comedian Ubaldo Pantani (in his impression of Lapo Elkann) the third, and Italian supermodel Bianca Balti the fourth; on that night, comedian Alessandro Siani joi as a surprise co-host. The co-hosts for the final were TG1 journalist Giorgia Cardinaletti and comedian Nino Frassica.

=== Theme music ===
The official music theme of the festival, "È Sanremo", was set to the tune of "Emigrato" by Welo, one of the finalist entries of the Sanremo Giovani selection which failed to qualify for the contest.

=== Promos ===
Between November 2025 and February 2026, a number of promotional ads for the festival were shot in different cities around Italy; in each promo, in keeping with the slogan Tutti cantano Sanremo ("Everybody sings Sanremo"), a local orchestra is shown playing and singing an entry from a past edition of Sanremo in a public square of the city, joined by gatherings of passersby. The promos were aired in the weeks preceding the festival, starting on 14 December.

Promo summary table (in chronological order)
City	Location	Song(s)	Sanremo edition(s)	Orchestra	Ref.
Trento	Piazza Duomo	"Che sarà"	1971	Mùsega de Poza	
Trento	Piazza Duomo	"Gianna"	1978	Mùsega de Poza	
Lucca	Piazza San Michele	"Piazza Grande"	1972	Luigi Boccherini Conservatory	
Lucca	Piazza San Michele	"Volevo essere un duro"	2025	Luigi Boccherini Conservatory	
Parma	Piazza Garibaldi	"Un'avventura"	1969	Arrigo Boito Conservatory	
Parma	Piazza Garibaldi	"Incoscienti giovani"	2025	Arrigo Boito Conservatory	
Turin	Porta Nuova railway station	"Nel blu, dipinto di blu"	1958	RAI National Symphony Orchestra	
Turin	Porta Nuova railway station	"Perdere l'amore"	1988	RAI National Symphony Orchestra	
Cosenza	Piazza Kennedy	"Maledetta primavera"	1981	Stanislao Giacomantonio Conservatory	
Cosenza	Piazza Kennedy	"La solitudine"	1993	Stanislao Giacomantonio Conservatory	
Cosenza	Piazza Kennedy	"Occidentali's Karma"	2017	Stanislao Giacomantonio Conservatory	
Rome	Piazza di Spagna	"Con te partirò"	1995	Santa Cecilia Conservatory (Note: Carlo Conti himself made an appearance in this promo.)	
Pesaro	Piazza Olivieri	"Ma che freddo fa"	1969	Gioachino Rossini Conservatory	
Pesaro	Piazza Olivieri	"Almeno tu nell'universo"	1989	Gioachino Rossini Conservatory	

=== Voting ===
Voting occurred again through the combination of three methods:

- Public televoting, carried out via landline and mobile phone.
- Jury of the press room, TV and web.
- Jury of the radio.

Their voting was articulated as follows:

- First night: all 30 entrants were judged by the jury of the press room, TV and web.
- Second night: half of the entrants were judged through a 50/50 split system by means of televoting and the jury of the radio, to be added up to the results of the first night. The four newcomers, competing in two duels, were judged by all three juries, determining the two finalists.
- Third night: the other half of the main entrants and the two newcomer finalists were judged as on the previous night, with the winner of the latter section being proclaimed.
- Fourth night: the covers were judged through a split system by means of the televoting (34%) and the two juries (33% each), determining the winner of the night.
- Fifth night: the entrants were judged through a split system by means of the televote (34%), and the two juries (33% each), to be added up to the results of the first three nights; ultimately, a final voting round (with the same split system) was held among the top five, which determined the winner.

=== Sanremo Top ===
Following the festival, Carlo Conti hosted two special broadcasts, titled Sanremo Top, on 7 and 14 March 2026, focusing on the commercial and chart success of the competing entries; the broadcasts reprised a similar programme with the same title which had regularly aired in the 1990s and 2000s.

== Selections ==
The four artists competing in the Newcomers' section, limited to people aged 16 to 29, were determined through two separate contests, namely Sanremo Giovani and Area Sanremo.

=== Sanremo Giovani 2025 ===
Two newcomers were determined through the Sanremo Giovani format. The contest was held from 11 November to 14 December 2025, and took place in three stages:

- four weekly "challenges" on 11, 18, 25 November and 2 December, held in Rome, presented by Gianluca Gazzoli and airing on Rai 2, each seeing six contestants, three of them advancing to the next stage based on the votes of the musical committee;
- a semi-final on 9 December, also held in Rome with Gazzoli and airing on Rai 2, where five (originally meant to be six) of the remaining eleven (originally meant to be twelve) (Note: Prior to the semi-final, it was announced that Soap had withdrawn for undisclosed personal reasons.) contestants were eliminated by the musical committee;
- a final on 14 December, titled Sarà Sanremo, held at the Sanremo Casino Theatre and presented by Gazzoli and Carlo Conti, airing live on Rai 1; the six finalists competed for two spots in the festival; the results were determined by the votes of the musical committee.

Online submissions for the selection were open between 10 September and 15 October 2025. On 22 October 2025, it was announced that 524 acts had applied, 34 of which were selected by a musical committee – composed of professionals Ema Stokholma, Carolina Rey, Manola Moslehi, Enrico Cremonesi, Daniele Battaglia and RAI director Claudio Fasulo, and chaired by the artistic director (Conti) – to take part in an audition round in Rome, where 24 of them advanced to the televised stage.

Advanced to the televised stage

Selected entries
Artist	Song	Songwriter(s)	Result
Agèlo	"Io distruggo"	Alessandro Vitagliano; Angelo Cagnazzo; Francesco Catitti; Manuel Morandi; Pietro Campana	—N/a
Alunno	"Bonnie & Clyde"	Mattia Alunno; Simone Floris	—N/a
Amsi	"Pizza americana"	Thomas Amella; Michael Consigli; Filippo Damagio; Simone Panero	Advanced
Angelica Bove	"Mattone"	Angelica Bove; Federico Nardelli; Matteo Pierotti	Advanced
Antonia	"Luoghi perduti"	Giordano Cremona; Federico Mercuri; Federica Abbate; Alex Andrea Vella; Alfredo Rapetti	Advanced
Axel	"Laurearsi"		—N/a
Cainero	"Nuntannamurà"	Noemi Cainero; Biagio Romano; Alexandros Paride Sangermano; Cristian Lamberti	Advanced
Caro Wow	"Cupido"	Carolina Spreti; Simone Sacchi; Viviana Colombo	Advanced
Cmqmartina	"Radio Erotika"	Martina Sironi; Alessandro Cianci; Angelo Sabia; Marco Ferrario	Advanced
Cola Siel	"Azzurro"	Cosimo Lalli; Dariana Koumanova; Federico Guzzetti	—N/a
Deddè	"Ddoje criature"	Gabriele Giuseppe Mazza; Emmanuel Di Donna; Davide De Blasio	Advanced
Disco Club Paradiso	"Mademoiselle"	Leonardo Bergonzini; Simone Murineddu; Giacomo Semenzato; Mario Castiglione	Advanced
Eyeline	"Finché dura"	Elena Passalacqua; Federico Sapia	Advanced
Jeson	"Inizialmente tu"	Pietro Celona; Daniele Fossatelli; Leonardo Zaccaria	Advanced
Joseph	"Fenomenale"	Giuseppe Salvatore Marra; Vincenzo Centrella; Francesco D'Agostino	Advanced
La Messa	"Maria"	Serena Mastrulli; Marco Zamuner; Marco Salvaderi; Lorenzo Santarelli; Gabriel Rossi	Advanced
Lea Gavino	"Amico lontano"	Lea Gavino; Valerio Smordoni	Advanced
Maddalena	"Senti menti"		—N/a
Marco Millie	"Lonely Boy"		—N/a
Mimì	"Sottovoce"	Francesco D'Agostino; Mimì Caruso; Vincenzo Raccuglia; Giovanni Amati; Vincenzo Centrella; Stefano Leo; Alessandro Fava	Advanced
Nicolò Filippucci	"Laguna"	Leonardo Lamacchia; Gianmarco Grande; Riccardo Schiara	Advanced
Nimsay	"Ahavah"		—N/a
Occhi	"Ullallà"	Emanuele Cotto; Raffaele Matteucci; Andrea Occhipinti	Advanced
Petit	"Un bel casino"	Giovanni Sciabbarrasi; Manuel Finotti; Salvatore Moccia	Advanced
Principe	"Mon amour"	Alessandro Fava; Eugenio Bovina	Advanced
Renato D'Amico	"Bacio piccolino"	Renato D'Amico	Advanced
Rondine	"Maleparole"		—N/a
Seltsam	"Scusa mamma"	Gabriel Guglielmini; Lorenzo Giovanniello	Advanced
Senza Cri	"Spiagge"	Matteo Soru; Stefano Tartaglini; Cristiana Carella	Advanced
Soap	"Buona vita"	Sophie Ottone; Adam Sayf Viacava; Giorgio De Lauri; Marco De Lauri	Advanced
Tära	"Mezzaluna"	Tamara Al Zool; Diego Bolognini; Patrizio Petrucci; Gianluca Sala; Giuliano Vigani; Paolo Malanchini	—N/a
Tenth Sky	"Gimme"		—N/a
Welo	"Emigrato"	Manuel Mariano; Antony Calicchio	Advanced
Xhovana	"Ego"	Davide Parato	Advanced

==== Challenges ====
First challenge night – 11 November 2025
Challenge	R/O	Artist	Song	Result
I	1	**Antonia**	**"Luoghi perduti"**	**Advanced**
I	2	Joseph	"Fenomenale"	—N/a
II	3	**La Messa**	**"Maria"**	**Advanced**
II	4	Xhovana	"Ego"	—N/a
III	5	Renato D'Amico	"Bacio piccolino"	—N/a
III	6	**Cmqmartina**	**"Radio Erotika"**	**Advanced**

Second challenge night – 18 November 2025
Challenge	R/O	Artist	Song	Result
I	1	**Angelica Bove**	**"Mattone"**	**Advanced**
I	2	Amsi	"Pizza americana"	—N/a
II	3	Disco Club Paradiso	"Mademoiselle"	—N/a
II	4	**Soap**	**"Buona vita"**	**Advanced**
III	5	Lea Gavino	"Amico lontano"	—N/a
III	6	**Nicolò Filippucci**	**"Laguna"**	**Advanced**

Second challenge night – 25 November 2025
Challenge	R/O	Artist	Song	Result
I	1	**Welo**	**"Emigrato"**	**Advanced**
I	2	Cainero	"Nuntannamurà"	—N/a
II	3	**Caro Wow**	**"Cupido"**	**Advanced**
II	4	Deddè	"Ddoje criature"	—N/a
III	5	Mimì	"Sottovoce"	—N/a
III	6	**Petit**	**"Un bel casino"**	**Advanced**

Second challenge night – 2 December 2025
Challenge	R/O	Artist	Song	Result
I	1	Eyeline	"Finché dura"	—N/a
I	2	**Principe**	**"Mon amour"**	**Advanced**
II	3	**Seltsam**	**"Scusa mamma"**	**Advanced**
II	4	Jeson	"Inizialmente tu"	—N/a
III	5	**Senza Cri**	**"Spiagge"**	**Advanced**
III	6	Occhi	"Ullallà"	—N/a

==== Semi-final ====
Semi-final – 9 December 2025
Challenge	R/O	Artist	Song	Result
I	1	Caro Wow	"Cupido"	—N/a
I	2	**Antonia**	**"Luoghi perduti"**	**Finalist**
II	2	**Welo**	**"Emigrato"**	**Finalist**
II	3	Cmqmartina	"Radio Erotika"	—N/a
III	4	Petit	"Un bel casino"	—N/a
III	5	**Nicolò Filippucci**	**"Laguna"**	**Finalist**
IV	6	**Angelica Bove**	**"Mattone"**	**Finalist**
IV	7	Principe	"Mon amour"	—N/a
V	8	La Messa	"Maria"	—N/a
V	9	**Seltsam**	**"Scusa mamma"**	**Finalist**
V	10	**Senza Cri**	**"Spiagge"**	**Finalist**
—N/a		Soap	"Buona vita"	Withdrew

==== Final ====
Final – 14 December 2025
Challenge	R/O	Artist	Song	Result
I	1	**Angelica Bove**	**"Mattone"**	**Superfinalist**
I	2	Welo	"Emigrato"	—N/a
II	3	**Nicolò Filippucci**	**"Laguna"**	**Superfinalist**
II	4	Seltsam	"Scusa mamma"	—N/a
III	5	Antonia	"Luoghi perduti"	—N/a
III	6	**Senza Cri**	**"Spiagge"**	**Superfinalist**

Superfinal – 14 December 2025
R/O	Artist	Song	Result
1	**Angelica Bove**	**"Mattone"**	**Winner**
2	**Nicolò Filippucci**	**"Laguna"**	**Winner**
3	Senza Cri	"Spiagge"	—N/a

=== Area Sanremo 2025 ===
The rules of the Area Sanremo selection, organised by the Municipality of Sanremo alongside the Sanremo Symphonic Orchestra Foundation, were released on 28 October 2025, with the opening of an online application platform lasting between 29 October and 29 November 2025. The 505 submitting acts were auditioned by a musical committee between 6 and 11 December 2025 at the Sanremo Palafiori, with the 22 qualifiers from this phase attending a second auditon round on 12 December, where ten winners were proclaimed; these proceeded to a final audition on 13 December, in which the two Sanremo newcomers were selected.

Area Sanremo finalists (winning entries are marked in bold; selected Sanremo entrants are underlined)
- **Albe**
- Alessandro
- **Andrea Heros**
- Ascanio
- Ayle & Didi
- **Blind, El Ma & Soniko**
- Bush
- **Enula**
- Equarantacinque
- Filippo Spanio
- Gobbi
- Kris Yodo
- **Matsby**
- **Matteo Alieno**
- **Mazzariello**
- Nausica
- Pablo Murphy
- Rizzo
- **Selmi**
- **Solø**
- **Tomasi**
- Tribo

== Competing entries ==
The contest features a Big Artists section and a Newcomers' section. The entries competing in the former were selected by the artistic director both from public submissions and by direct invitation, and were announced on 30 November 2025; the number of entries, originally planned to be 26, was later announced to be higher and finally revealed to be 30. Four acts, as determined through the Sanremo Giovani and Area Sanremo formats, are competing in the latter section. The titles of the Big Artists' entries, as well as those of the two newcomers selected from Area Sanremo, were announced during Sarà Sanremo, the special broadcast of 14 December 2025 in which the Sanremo Giovani final was included.

For the first time in the history of the festival, the hosts and performers of the Big Artists section were invited by the President of the Italian Republic, Sergio Mattarella, to attend a ceremony at the Quirinal Palace on 13 February 2026.

Big Artists section
Artist(s)	Song	Songwriter(s)	Conductor	Rank	Awards
Arisa	"Magica favola"	Rosalba Pippa; Giuseppe Anastasi; Marco Cantagalli; Fabio Dalè; Carlo Frigerio	Gioni Barbera (Note: Roberto Molinelli on the cover night.)	4	—N/a
Bambole di pezza	"Resta con me"	Lisa Cerri; Martina Ungarelli; Caterina Alessandra Dolci; Daniela Piccirillo; Federica Rossi; Andrea Spigaroli; Francesco Tarducci; Simone Borrelli	Enrico Melozzi	13	—N/a
Chiello	"Ti penso sempre"	Rocco Modello; Tommaso Ottomano; Fausto Cigarini; Saverio Cigarini; Matteo Pigoni	Fausto Cigarini	25	—N/a
Dargen D'Amico	"AI AI"	Jacopo Matteo Luca D'Amico; Edwyn Roberts; Gianluigi Fazio; Pietro Bagni	Enzo Campagnoli	27	—N/a
Ditonellapiaga	"Che fastidio!"	Margherita Carducci; Edoardo Castroni; Edoardo Ruzzi; Alessandro Casagni	Carolina Bubbico	3	Orchestra's "Giancarlo Bigazzi" Award for Best Musical Composition
Eddie Brock	"Avvoltoi"	Edoardo Iaschi; Lorenzo Iaschi; Vincenzo Leone	Valeriano Chiaravalle	30	—N/a
Elettra Lamborghini	"Voilà"	Edwyn Roberts; Andrea Bonomo; Pietro Celona	Enzo Campagnoli	26	—N/a
Enrico Nigiotti	"Ogni volta che non so volare"	Enrico Nigiotti; Luigi De Crescenzo; Fabiano Pagnozzi	Enrico Brun	20	—N/a
Ermal Meta	"Stella stellina"	Ermal Meta; Gianni Pollex; Dario Faini	Diego Calvetti	8	—N/a
Fedez and Marco Masini	"Male necessario"	Federico Leonardo Lucia; Marco Masini; Alessandro La Cava; Federica Abbate; Antonio Iammarino; Nicola Lazzarin	Valeriano Chiaravalle	5	Musical commission's "Sergio Bardotti" Award for Best Lyrics
Francesco Renga	"Il meglio di me"	Francesco Renga; Stefano Tartaglino; Antonio Caputo; Simone Reo; Mattia Davì; Davide Sartore	Valeriano Chiaravalle	23	—N/a
Fulminacci	"Stupida sfortuna"	Filippo Uttinacci; Pietro Paroletti	Pietro Paroletti	7	"Mia Martini" Critics Award
J-Ax	"Italia Starter Pack"	Alessandro Aleotti; Andrea Bonomo; Lorenzo Buso	Carmelo Patti	15	—N/a
LDA and Aka 7even	"Poesie clandestine"	Luca D'Alessio; Luca Marzano; Alessandro Caiazza; Vito Petrozzino; Mattia Villan; Francesco D'Alessio; Riccardo Romito	Francesco D'Alessio	11	—N/a
Leo Gassmann	"Naturale"	Leo Gassmann; Mattia Davì; Alessandro Casali; Francesco Savini	Enrico Melozzi	28	—N/a
Levante	"Sei tu"	Claudia Lagona	Alessandro Trabace	14	—N/a
Luchè	"Labirinto"	Luca Imprudente; Davide Petrella; Stefano Tognini; Rosario Castagnola	Adriano Pennino	12	—N/a
Malika Ayane	"Animali notturni"	Malika Ayane; Edwyn Roberts; Stefano Marletta; Luca Faraone; Federico Mercuri; Giordano Cremona	Daniele Parziani	19	—N/a
Mara Sattei	"Le cose che non sai di me"	Sara Mattei; Davide Mattei; Alessandro Donadei; Enrico Brun	Enrico Brun	29	—N/a
Maria Antonietta and Colombre	"La felicità e basta"	Letizia Cesarini; Giovanni Imparato; Francesco Catitti	Carmelo Patti	21	—N/a
Michele Bravi	"Prima o poi"	Michele Bravi; Gianmarco Grande; Tommaso Santoni	Alterisio Paoletti	22	—N/a
Nayt	"Prima che"	William Mezzanotte; Stefano Tognini	Riccardo Zangirolami	6	—N/a
Patty Pravo	"Opera"	Giovanni Caccamo	Valter Sivilotti	24	—N/a
Raf	"Ora e per sempre"	Raffaele Riefoli; Samuele Riefoli	Fabio Barnaba	18	—N/a
Sal Da Vinci	"Per sempre sì"	Salvatore Michael Sorrentino; Francesco Sorrentino; Alessandro La Cava; Federica Abbate; Federico Mercuri; Giordano Cremona; Eugenio Maimone	Adriano Pennino	1	Winner of the "Big Artists" section – Golden Lion
Samurai Jay	"Ossessione"	Gennaro Amatore; Salvatore Sellitti; Luca Stocco; Vittorio Coppola	Enzo Campagnoli	17	—N/a
Sayf	"Tu mi piaci tanto"	Adam Sayf Viacava; Luca Di Blasi; Giorgio De Lauri	Giovanni Pallotti	2	—N/a
Serena Brancale	"Qui con me"	Serena Brancale; Noemi Bruno; Alfredo Bruno; Salvatore Mineo; Carlo Avarello; Fabio Barnaba	Nicole Brancale	9	Lunezia Award; Press room's "Lucio Dalla" Award; TIM Award for Most Voted Artist on TIM Media Platforms
Tommaso Paradiso	"I romantici"	Tommaso Paradiso; Davide Petrella; Davide Simonetta	Carmelo Patti	10	—N/a
Tredici Pietro	"Uomo che cade"	Pietro Morandi; Antonio Di Martino; Marco Spaggiari	Giovanni Pallotti	16	—N/a

Newcomers' section
Artist(s)	Song	Songwriter(s)	Conductor	Rank	Awards
Angelica Bove	"Mattone"	Angelica Bove; Federico Nardelli; Matteo Pierotti	Valeriano Chiaravalle	2	"Mia Martini" Critics Award; Press room's "Lucio Dalla" Award
Blind, El Ma & Soniko	"Nei miei DM"	Franco Popi Rujan; Niccolò Cervellin; Dariana Koumanova; Giuseppe Gallicchio	Enrico Melozzi	3	—N/a
Mazzariello	"Manifestazione d'amore"	Antonio Mazzariello; Francesco Pesaresi; Gianmarco Manilardi	Riccardo Zangirolami	3	Nuovo IMAIE "Enzo Jannacci" Award
Nicolò Filippucci	"Laguna"	Leonardo Lamacchia; Gianmarco Grande; Riccardo Schiara	Carmelo Patti	1	Winner of the Newcomers' section – Silver Lion

== Shows ==
=== First night ===
All 30 artists performed their competing songs. The top 5 were announced in a random order.

First night – 24 February 2026
R/O	Artist	Song	Press jury ranking
1	Ditonellapiaga	"Che fastidio!"	3
2	Michele Bravi	"Prima o poi"	23
3	Sayf	"Tu mi piaci tanto"	10
4	Mara Sattei	"Le cose che non sai di me"	25
5	Dargen D'Amico	"AI AI"	19
6	Arisa	"Magica favola"	5
7	Luchè	"Labirinto"	30
8	Tommaso Paradiso	"I romantici"	8
9	Elettra Lamborghini	"Voilà"	29
10	Patty Pravo	"Opera"	21
11	Samurai Jay	"Ossessione"	27
12	Raf	"Ora e per sempre"	15
13	J-Ax	"Italia Starter Pack"	16
14	Fulminacci	"Stupida sfortuna"	2
15	Levante	"Sei tu"	9
16	Fedez and Marco Masini	"Male necessario"	4
17	Ermal Meta	"Stella stellina"	11
18	Serena Brancale	"Qui con me"	1
19	Nayt	"Prima che"	20
20	Malika Ayane	"Animali notturni"	7
21	Eddie Brock	"Avvoltoi"	28
22	Sal Da Vinci	"Per sempre sì"	6
23	Enrico Nigiotti	"Ogni volta che non so volare"	17
24	Tredici Pietro	"Uomo che cade"	12
25	Chiello	"Ti penso sempre"	26
26	Bambole di pezza	"Resta con me"	14
27	Maria Antonietta and Colombre	"La felicità e basta"	13
28	Leo Gassmann	"Naturale"	24
29	Francesco Renga	"Il meglio di me"	22
30	LDA and Aka 7even	"Poesie clandestine"	18

=== Second night ===
Fifteen of the competing artists performed their competing songs for a second time. The top 5 were announced in a random order.

The night was opened by the Newcomers' semi-final.

Second night – 25 February 2026
R/O	Artist	Song	Night rankings			
R/O	Artist	Song	Radio jury	Televote		Total ranking
R/O	Artist	Song	Radio jury	%	Place	Total ranking
1	Patty Pravo	"Opera"	13	3.73%	13	13
2	LDA and Aka 7even	"Poesie clandestine"	12	10.22%	4	5
3	Enrico Nigiotti	"Ogni volta che non so volare"	11	4.86%	9	11
4	Tommaso Paradiso	"I romantici"	4	8.36%	5	4
5	Elettra Lamborghini	"Voilà"	15	2.65%	14	14
6	Ermal Meta	"Stella stellina"	9	10.74%	3	3
7	Levante	"Sei tu"	3	4.85%	10	8
8	Bambole di pezza	"Resta con me"	7	5.04%	8	9
9	Chiello	"Ti penso sempre"	14	4.11%	12	12
10	J-Ax	"Italia Starter Pack"	6	4.31%	11	10
11	Nayt	"Prima che"	8	13.94%	1	1
12	Fulminacci	"Stupida sfortuna"	2	7.35%	6	6
13	Fedez and Marco Masini	"Male necessario"	5	11.49%	2	2
14	Dargen D'Amico	"AI AI"	10	1.26%	15	15
15	Ditonellapiaga	"Che fastidio!"	1	7.09%	7	7

Semi-final (Newcomers) – 25 February 2026
Challenge	R/O	Artist	Song	Press jury	Radio jury	Televote		Result
Challenge	R/O	Artist	Song	Press jury	Radio jury	%	Place	Result
I	1	Nicolò Filippucci	"Laguna"	1	1	94.30%	1	Finalist
I	2	Blind, El Ma & Soniko	"Nei miei DM"	2	2	5.70%	2	—N/a
II	3	Mazzariello	"Manifestazione d'amore"	2	2	52.11%	1	—N/a
II	4	Angelica Bove	"Mattone"	1	1	47.89%	2	Finalist

=== Third night ===
The remaining fifteen artists performed their competing songs for a second time. The top 5 were announced in a random order.

The night was opened by the Newcomers' final.

Third night – 26 February 2026
R/O	Artist	Song	Night rankings			
R/O	Artist	Song	Radio jury	Televote		Total ranking
R/O	Artist	Song	Radio jury	%	Place	Total ranking
1	Maria Antonietta and Colombre	"La felicità e basta"	7	1.56%	14	12
2	Leo Gassmann	"Naturale"	14	2.86%	11	13
3	Malika Ayane	"Animali notturni"	1	2.05%	13	9
4	Sal Da Vinci	"Per sempre sì"	3	20.88%	1	1
5	Tredici Pietro	"Uomo che cade"	9	4.80%	7	7
6	Raf	"Ora e per sempre"	5	4.02%	8	8
7	Francesco Renga	"Il meglio di me"	13	3.10%	9	11
8	Eddie Brock	"Avvoltoi"	15	2.66%	12	14
9	Serena Brancale	"Qui con me"	2	7.40%	5	5
10	Samurai Jay	"Ossessione"	8	4.86%	6	6
11	Arisa	"Magica favola"	6	16.79%	2	2
12	Michele Bravi	"Prima o poi"	12	3.01%	10	10
13	Luchè	"Labirinto"	11	11.03%	4	4
14	Mara Sattei	"Le cose che non sai di me"	10	1.51%	15	15
15	Sayf	"Tu mi piaci tanto"	4	13.50%	3	3

Final (Newcomers) – 26 February 2026
R/O	Artist	Song	Press jury	Radio jury	Televote		Total score	Place
R/O	Artist	Song	Press jury	Radio jury	%	Place	Total score	Place
1	Angelica Bove	"Mattone"	1	2	24.96%	2	39.9%	2
2	Nicolò Filippucci	"Laguna"	2	1	75.04%	1	60.1%	1

=== Fourth night ===
The artists performed an Italian or international song from the past, duetting with one or more guest performers.

Fourth night – 27 February 2026
R/O	Artist(s)	Guest artist(s)	Song	Rankings				
R/O	Artist(s)	Guest artist(s)	Song	Radio jury	Press jury	Televote		Total ranking
R/O	Artist(s)	Guest artist(s)	Song	Radio jury	Press jury	%	Place	Total ranking
1	Elettra Lamborghini	Las Ketchup	"Aserejé"	27	27	2.64%	14	21
2	Eddie Brock	Fabrizio Moro	"Portami via"	26	24	1.81%	21	24
3	Mara Sattei	Mecna	"L'ultimo bacio"	29	29	0.84%	29	29
4	Patty Pravo	Timofej Andrijashenko	"Ti lascio una canzone"	30	28	0.96%	28	30
5	Levante	Gaia	"I maschi"	17	17	2.05%	19	19
6	Malika Ayane	Claudio Santamaria	"Mi sei scoppiato dentro il cuore"	9	16	1.57%	22	20
7	Bambole di pezza	Cristina D'Avena	"Occhi di gatto" (Note: The performance included a portion of "Whole Lotta Love".)	2	6	5.31%	5	4
8	Dargen D'Amico	Pupo and Fabrizio Bosso	"Su di noi"	15	8	3.92%	10	9
9	Tommaso Paradiso	Stadio	"L'ultima luna"	6	15	2.58%	15	13
10	Michele Bravi	Fiorella Mannoia	"Domani è un altro giorno"	12	12	2.37%	16	16
11	Tredici Pietro	Galeffi, Fudasca and band (Note: With the uncredited surprise participation of Gianni Morandi.)	"Vita"	7	5	5.30%	6	5
12	Maria Antonietta and Colombre	Brunori Sas	"Il mondo"	16	14	1.35%	24	22
13	Fulminacci	Francesca Fagnani	"Parole parole"	20	19	2.89%	13	14
14	LDA and Aka 7even	Tullio De Piscopo	"Andamento lento"	10	3	4.44%	8	7
15	Raf	The Kolors	"The Riddle"	11	22	1.11%	26	23
16	J-Ax	Ligera County Fam. (Note: Ligera County Fam., a group set up for the occasion, was composed of Cochi Ponzoni, Paolo Jannacci, Paolo Rossi and Ale & Franz. It was named after the ligera, the underworld of 20th-century Milan.)	"E la vita, la vita"	8	11	2.11%	18	17
17	Ditonellapiaga	TonyPitony	"The Lady Is a Tramp"	1	2	14.50%	1	1
18	Enrico Nigiotti	Alfa	"En e Xanax"	14	9	3.11%	11	11
19	Serena Brancale	Gregory Porter and Delia	"Bésame mucho"	3	7	2.21%	17	12
20	Sayf	Alex Britti and Mario Biondi (Note: With the uncredited participation of Jiz and Dibla.)	"Hit the Road, Jack"	5	4	8.79%	2	2
21	Francesco Renga	Giusy Ferreri	"Ragazzo solo, ragazza sola"	22	26	0.59%	30	28
22	Arisa	Choir of the Teatro Regio di Parma	"Quello che le donne non dicono"	4	1	6.46%	3	3
23	Samurai Jay	Belén Rodríguez and Roy Paci (Note: With the uncredited participation of Vito Salamanca and Luca Stocco.)	"Baila morena"	23	25	1.50%	23	25
24	Sal Da Vinci	Michele Zarrillo	"Cinque giorni"	13	10	5.76%	4	6
25	Fedez and Marco Masini	Stjepan Hauser	"Meravigliosa creatura"	24	21	3.07%	12	15
26	Ermal Meta	Dardust	"Golden Hour"	18	13	2.02%	20	18
27	Nayt	Joan Thiele	"La canzone dell'amore perduto"	19	18	4.52%	7	8
28	Luchè	Gianluca Grignani	"Falco a metà"	21	23	4.05%	9	10
29	Chiello	Saverio Cigarini (Note: Morgan, who had originally been announced as Chiello's guest performer, later specified he would not appear on stage and would only offer backstage support instead.)	"Mi sono innamorato di te"	28	30	1.04%	27	27
30	Leo Gassmann	Aiello	"Era già tutto previsto"	25	20	1.12%	25	26

=== Fifth night ===
All 30 artists performed their competing songs. The top 5 artists of the combined rankings of this and the first three shows advanced to a superfinal, where the juries and televote determined the winner.

Advanced to the superfinal

Final – 28 February 2026
R/O	Artist	Song	Provisional ranking	Night rankings					Final ranking
R/O	Artist	Song	Provisional ranking	Radio jury	Press jury	Televote		Total ranking	Final ranking
R/O	Artist	Song	Provisional ranking	Radio jury	Press jury	%	Place	Total ranking	Final ranking
1	Francesco Renga	"Il meglio di me"	24	26	26	1.10%	21	24	23
2	Chiello	"Ti penso sempre"	21	30	30	1.26%	20	26	25
3	Raf	"Ora e per sempre"	18	17	19	1.52%	17	19	18
4	Bambole di pezza	"Resta con me"	15	14	9	2.61%	13	12	13
5	Leo Gassmann	"Naturale"	26	29	24	0.83%	23	28	28
6	Malika Ayane	"Animali notturni"	20	7	8	0.72%	24	18	19
7	Tommaso Paradiso	"I romantici"	8	5	13	4.07%	10	11	10
8	J-Ax	"Italia Starter Pack"	17	13	16	1.96%	15	15	15
9	LDA and Aka 7even	"Poesie clandestine"	9	18	12	4.91%	8	10	11
10	Serena Brancale	"Qui con me"	12	8	5	4.01%	11	9	9
11	Patty Pravo	"Opera"	22	24	25	0.62%	26	27	24
12	Sal Da Vinci	"Per sempre sì"	1	6	6	13.16%	1	1	1
13	Elettra Lamborghini	"Voilà"	28	27	27	1.63%	16	21	26
14	Ermal Meta	"Stella stellina"	7	20	11	5.52%	7	8	8
15	Ditonellapiaga	"Che fastidio!"	11	1	2	6.62%	4	4	4
16	Nayt	"Prima che"	4	15	17	5.72%	6	7	6
17	Arisa	"Magica favola"	2	10	3	11.04%	2	3	2
18	Sayf	"Tu mi piaci tanto"	3	3	4	10.94%	3	2	3
19	Levante	"Sei tu"	13	4	10	1.31%	19	14	14
20	Fedez and Marco Masini	"Male necessario"	5	9	7	5.80%	5	5	5
21	Samurai Jay	"Ossessione"	14	16	21	2.08%	14	16	17
22	Michele Bravi	"Prima o poi"	23	23	21	0.95%	22	23	22
23	Fulminacci	"Stupida sfortuna"	10	2	1	4.10%	9	6	7
24	Luchè	"Labirinto"	6	25	29	3.71%	12	13	12
25	Tredici Pietro	"Uomo che cade"	16	12	15	1.50%	18	17	16
26	Mara Sattei	"Le cose che non sai di me"	29	22	23	0.40%	29	29	29
27	Dargen D'Amico	"AI AI"	30	19	20	0.44%	28	25	27
28	Enrico Nigiotti	"Ogni volta che non so volare"	19	21	18	0.66%	25	22	20
29	Maria Antonietta and Colombre	"La felicità e basta"	25	11	14	0.32%	30	20	21
30	Eddie Brock	"Avvoltoi"	27	28	28	0.49%	27	30	30

Superfinal – 28 February 2026
R/O	Artist	Song	Provisional ranking	Second round rankings				Total score	Final ranking
R/O	Artist	Song	Provisional ranking	Radio jury	Press jury	Televote		Total score	Final ranking
R/O	Artist	Song	Provisional ranking	Radio jury	Press jury	%	Place	Total score	Final ranking
1	Fedez and Marco Masini	"Male necessario"	5	4	5	11.86%	5	16.45%	5
2	Arisa	"Magica favola"	2	5	2	19.23%	3	18.93%	4
3	Ditonellapiaga	"Che fastidio!"	4	1	1	18.94%	4	20.57%	3
4	Sal Da Vinci	"Per sempre sì"	1	2	4	23.56%	2	22.17%	1
5	Sayf	"Tu mi piaci tanto"	3	3	3	26.41%	1	21.88%	2

== Special guests and other acts ==
Special guests included:

- first night – latest Sanremo winner Olly, 106-year-old Gianna Pratesi (among the Italian women who first voted in the 1946 Italian institutional referendum), Tiziano Ferro, Gaia and Kabir Bedi;
- second night – ANFFAS choir, Olympic medalists Francesca Lollobrigida and Lisa Vittozzi, Paralympic athletes Giacomo Bertagnolli and Giuliana Turra, Bresh, soprano Valentina Gargano, Camilla Ardenzi (Ornella Vanoni's granddaughter) and Fausto Leali;
- third night – Mogol, Piccolo Coro dell'Antoniano, Virginia Raffaele, Fabio De Luigi, Alicia Keys, Eros Ramazzotti and The Kolors;
- fourth night – Francesco Gabbani, Caterina Caselli and Vincenzo Schettini;
- fifth night – Andrea Bocelli, Pooh, Stefano De Martino and Gino Cecchettin.

Gaia, Bresh, The Kolors, Francesco Gabbani and Pooh, each a guest on one of the evenings, are performing from the "Suzuki Stage" in Piazza Colombo. Singer Max Pezzali was a regular guest on all of the nights, performing live from the stage of a cruise ship; another regular guest on the first three nights was impressionist Vincenzo De Lucia, impersonating Pausini in brief skits.

In addition, historical Sanremo figures that died throughout the previous year – namely Pippo Baudo, Peppe Vessicchio, Ornella Vanoni, Sandro Giacobbe, Tony Dallara, Angela Luce, Gianni Pettenati and Maurizio Costanzo – were memorialized, while Fausto Leali, Mogol, Caterina Caselli, Andrea Bocelli and Pooh were awarded special lifetime achievement prizes. Stefano De Martino was introduced as the main host of the 2027 festival.

== Broadcasts and ratings ==
=== Local broadcast ===
Rai 1 and Rai Radio 2 brought the official broadcasts of the festival in Italy – the latter with commentary by Gino Castaldo and Ema Stokholma. The five evenings were also streamed online via the broadcaster's official online platform RaiPlay.

=== International broadcast ===
Outside Italy, RAI aired the festival on its international channel Rai Italia and made the RaiPlay broadcast available worldwide, including all member countries of the European Broadcasting Union; the festival, serving as the Italian national final for the Eurovision Song Contest, was also broadcast on the Eurovision network.

=== Ratings ===
Live show	Timeslot (UTC+1)	Date	Start (8:40 pm – 9:15 pm)		1st time (9:15 pm – 11:30 pm)		2nd time (11:30 pm – 1:30 am)		Overall audience		Ref(s)
Live show	Timeslot (UTC+1)	Date	Viewers (millions)	Share (%)	Viewers (millions)	Share (%)	Viewers (millions)	Share (%)	Viewers (millions)	Share (%)	Ref(s)
1st	8:40 pm	24 February 2026	12.818	50.9	12.771	57.5	5.866	58.2	9.600	58	
2nd	8:40 pm	25 February 2026	11.012	47.3	11.224	57.8	5.769	62.3	9.053	59.5	
3rd	8:40 pm	26 February 2026	11.000	46.1	12.322	60	5.764	60.7	9.543	60.6	
4th	8:40 pm	27 February 2026	12.279	51.6	13.709	64.1	7.316	67.5	10.522	65.2	
5th	8:40 pm	28 February 2026	11.757	53.2	13.299	64.4	8.757	74.4	11.022	68.8	

== See also ==
- Italy in the Eurovision Song Contest 2026
