= Ossessione (song) =

2026 single by Samurai Jay

Single by Samurai Jay

from the album Amatore
- Released: 25 February 2026
- Genre: Salsa; bachata; dance-pop; electro-hop
- Length: 3:08
- Label: Island; Universal
- Composers: Luca Stocco; Vittorio Coppola
- Lyricists: Gennaro Amatore; Salvatore Sellitti
- Producers: Vito Salamanca; Katoo

Samurai Jay singles chronology
"Halo" (2025)	"Ossessione" (2026)	"Flamenco paranoia" (2026)

Music video
- "Ossessione" on YouTube

"Ossessione" ("Obsession") is a song co-written and recorded by Italian rapper Samurai Jay, released on 25 February 2026 through Island Records and Universal Music Italia. The song competed in the Sanremo Music Festival 2026.

== Music video ==
The music video for "Ossessione", directed by Fabrizio Conte and produced by Borotalco.tv, was published in conjunction with the release of the song on Jay's YouTube channel. The video also features Belén Rodríguez, Sayf, Rkomi, Joshua, Naiara and Brunori Sas, among others.

== Promotion ==
Italian broadcaster RAI organised the 76th edition of the Sanremo Music Festival between 24 and 28 February 2026. On 30 November 2025, Jay was announced among the participants of the festival, with the title of his competing entry revealed the following 14 December. The song finished in 17th place.

== Charts ==
Chart performance for "Ossessione"
Chart (2026)	Peak position
Global Excl. US (Billboard)	81
Italy (FIMI)	1
Italy Airplay (EarOne)	2
Switzerland (Schweizer Hitparade)	32

== Certifications ==
Certifications for "Ossessione"
Region	Certification	Certified units/sales
Italy (FIMI)	2× Platinum	400,000^{‡}
^{‡} Sales+streaming figures based on certification alone.
