= Prima che =

2026 single by Nayt

Single by Nayt

from the album Io individuo
- Released: 25 February 2026
- Genre: Conscious hip-hop; alternative hip-hop
- Length: 3:19
- Label: Columbia; VNT1; Sony Music
- Composer: Stefano Tognini
- Lyricist: William Mezzanotte
- Producer: Zef

Nayt singles chronology
"Un uomo" (2025)	"Prima che" (2026)	"La canzone dell'amore perduto" (2026)

Music video
- "Prima che" on YouTube

"Prima che" ("Before") is a song co-written and recorded by Italian rapper Nayt, released on 25 February 2026 through Columbia, VNT1 and Sony Music as the second single from the ninth studio album, Io individuo.

The song was presented in competition during the Sanremo Music Festival 2026.

== Music video ==
The music video for "Prima che", directed by Giulio Rosati, was published in conjunction with the release of the song through Nayt's YouTube channel.

== Promotion ==
Italian broadcaster RAI organised the 76th edition of the Sanremo Music Festival between 24 and 28 February 2026. On 30 November 2025, Nayt was announced among the participants of the festival, with the title of his competing entry revealed the following 14 December.

== Charts ==
Chart performance for "Prima che"
Chart (2026)	Peak position
Italy (FIMI)	4
Italy Airplay (EarOne)	44

== Certifications ==
Certifications for "Prima che"
Region	Certification	Certified units/sales
Italy (FIMI)	Gold	100,000^{‡}
^{‡} Sales+streaming figures based on certification alone.
