= Magica favola =

2026 single by Arisa

Single by Arisa

from the album Foto mosse
- Released: 25 February 2026
- Length: 3:30
- Label: Pipshow; Warner
- Composers: Marco Cantagalli; Fabio Dalè; Carlo Frigerio
- Lyricists: Rosalba Pippa; Giuseppe Anastasi
- Producer: Mamakass

Arisa singles chronology
"Nuvole" (2025)	"Magica favola" (2026)

"Magica favola" ("Magical Fairy Tale") is a song co-written and recorded by Italian singer Arisa, released on 25 February 2026 through Warner Music Group as the lead single from her upcoming eighth studio album, Foto mosse.

The song was presented in competition during the Sanremo Music Festival 2026.

== Background ==
"Magica favola" was written by Arisa herself with Marco Cantagalli and Giuseppe Anastasi, the latter already author of two songs performed by Arisa during the previous Sanremo editions ("Sincerità" and "La notte"). The song was composed by Fabio Dalè and Carlo Frigerio. In an interview with Adnkronos, Arisa has stated that "it's a song she wrote with Galeffi, Giuseppe Anastasi, and Mamakass, and it's the story of a life." She also talks about "something that's her, but it's also something that probably represents a generation: focusing on professional growth, losing things along the way, and living experiences that, when they ended, also leaving behind great pain in the process. Before, her greatest aspiration was to find someone to share her love life with. She then realized that love can be found in many different ways. Focusing only on one thing can be a waste of time that keeps you from seeing everything else.

== Promotion ==
Italian broadcaster RAI organised the 76th edition of the Sanremo Music Festival between 24 and 28 February 2026. On 30 November 2025, Arisa was announced among the participants of the festival, marking her eighth participation in the event as a competitor. The title of her competing entry was revealed the following 14 December.

== Charts ==
Chart performance for "Magica favola"
Chart (2026)	Peak position
Italy (FIMI)	9
Italy Airplay (EarOne)	40
