= Voilà (Elettra Lamborghini song) =

2026 single by Elettra Lamborghini

Single by Elettra Lamborghini
- Released: 25 February 2026
- Genre: Dance-pop
- Length: 3:12
- Label: Island; Universal
- Songwriters: Andrea Bonomo; Edwyn Roberts; Pietro Celona
- Producer: Celo

Elettra Lamborghini singles chronology
"Putivuelta" (2025)	"Voilà" (2026)

"Voilà" is a song recorded by Italian singer Elettra Lamborghini, released on 25 February 2026 by Island and Universal.

The song served as Lamborghini's competing entry during the Sanremo Music Festival 2026.

== Background ==
"Voilà" was written and composed by Andrea Bonomo, Pietro Celona, and Edwyn Clark Roberts. In an interview with Radio Italia, Lamborghini stated "she really like this song, which had been a while since she had a song shed like this much." She stated she had been listening to songs for a year, but rejected them all. The songwriters, Bonomo and Edwin, gave her an incredible boost. She immediately felt it would be perfect for Sanremo. Then it was written for her, because she sometimes receive songs written for others, but this one is truly hers.

== Music video ==
The music video for "Voilà", directed by Marco Braia, was published in conjunction with the release of the song through Lamborghini's YouTube channel.

== Promotion ==
Italian broadcaster RAI organised the 76th edition of the Sanremo Music Festival between 24 and 28 February 2026. On 30 November 2025, Lamborghini was announced among the participants of the festival, with the title of her competing entry revealed the following 14 December.

== Charts ==
Chart performance for "Voilà"
Chart (2026)	Peak position
Italy (FIMI)	16
Italy Airplay (EarOne)	28
