= I romantici =

2026 single by Tommaso Paradiso

Single by Tommaso Paradiso

from the album Casa Paradiso
- Language: Italian
- Released: 25 February 2026
- Genre: Indie pop
- Length: 3:59
- Label: Columbia
- Composers: Tommaso Paradiso; Davide Petrella; Davide Simonetta
- Lyricists: Tommaso Paradiso; Davide Petrella
- Producer: Davide Simonetta

Tommaso Paradiso singles chronology
"Forse" (2025)	"I romantici" (2026)

"I romantici" (Italian: [i roˈmantitʃi]; "The Romantics") is a song co-written and recorded by Italian singer-songwriter Tommaso Paradiso, released on 25 February 2026 through Columbia and included in the deluxe edition of his third studio album, Casa Paradiso.

The song was presented in competition during the Sanremo Music Festival 2026.

== Music video ==
The music video for "I romantici", directed by YouNuts!, was published in conjunction with the release of the song through Tommaso Paradiso's YouTube channel.

== Promotion ==
Italian broadcaster RAI organised the 76th edition of the Sanremo Music Festival between 24 and 28 February 2026. On 30 November 2025, Paradiso was announced among the participants of the festival, with the title of his competing entry revealed the following 14 December.

== Charts ==
Chart performance for "I romantici"
Chart (2026)	Peak position
Italy (FIMI)	8
Italy Airplay (EarOne)	4

== Certifications ==
Certifications for "I romantici"
Region	Certification	Certified units/sales
Italy (FIMI)	Platinum	200,000^{‡}
^{‡} Sales+streaming figures based on certification alone.
