= Angelica Bove =

Italian singer-songwriter (born 2003)

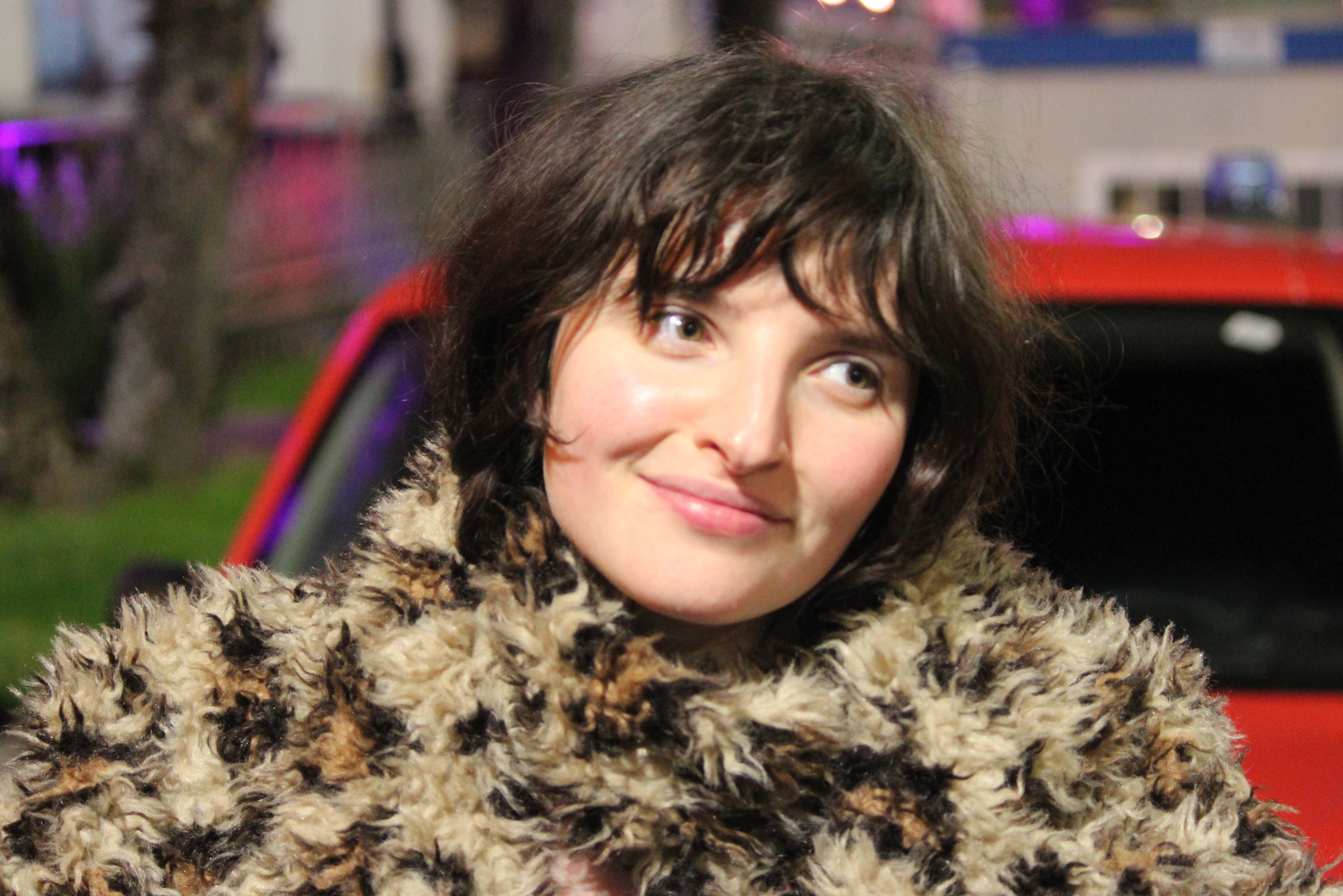
- Angelica Bove in February 2026

Background information
- Born: 5 May 2003 (age 23); Rome, Lazio, Italy
- Genre: Pop
- Occupations: Singer; songwriter
- Instruments: Vocals; piano
- Years active: 2023–present
- Labels: Warner Music Italy (2023–present); Atlantic Italy (2025–present)

Logo

Angelica Bove (born 5 May 2003) is an Italian singer-songwriter.

== Early life and education ==
Born in Rome in 2003 to quadruplets alongside siblings Silvia, Aurora, and Michelangelo, she is the daughter of Eleonora Paliani, who had already had a son, Davide, before the quadruplets. A year later, Jacopo was born, completing the large family, a detail that became public knowledge due to the exceptional nature of the case.

From a young age, she was drawn to music, spontaneously discovering her vocal talent. At nineteen, she lost both her parents in a tragic car accident. To overcome her grief, she began to actively dedicate herself to music, posting covers of well-known hits on TikTok and finding singing a form of personal expression.

== Career ==
In June 2023 she decided to sign up for the casting of the seventeenth edition of the talent show X Factor, hosted by Francesca Michielin, where she took part in Ambra Angiolini's team. She was then eliminated during the semi-final on 30 November, in which she performed her single "L'inverno".

On 4 October 2024 she released the autobiographical single "Bellissimo e poi niente". In the same month she was selected to participate in Sanremo Giovani 2024, the youth competition for the Sanremo Music Festival 2025, with the song "La nostra malinconia". After making it through the first round and the semifinal, reaching the final where she was eliminated.

In October 2025, she was again selected to participate in Sanremo Giovani 2025, with the song "Mattone". After making it through the first round and the semifinal, she reached the final, where she managed to qualify for the Sanremo Music Festival 2026 in the Newcomers section. After passing the semi-final on 25 February, the following day she ranked second in the final of the third evening, winning the "Mia Martini" Critics' Award and the "Lucio Dalla" Radio-TV-Web Press Room Award. The song anticipated her first studio album Tana, released on 30 January 2026 and consisting of nine tracks. It was followed by the summer tour of the same name in the months between May and September. On 11 September the single "Piccola magia" was released, recorded with Prima stanza a destra.

== Discography ==
=== Studio albums ===
List of studio albums with details
Title	Album details
Tana	Released: 30 January 2026; Label: Atlantic Italy, Warner Music Italy; Format: digital download, streaming

=== Singles ===
List of singles, with chart positions and album name
Title	Year	Peak chart positions	Album or EP
Title	Year	ITA	Album or EP
"L'inverno"	2023	—	Non-album singles
"Bellissimo e poi niente"	2024	—	Non-album singles
"La nostra malinconia"	2024	—	Non-album singles
"Mattone"	2025	33	Tana
"Piccola magia" (with Prima stanza a destra)	2026	—	Non-album single
"—" denotes singles that did not chart or were not released.

== Tours ==
- 2026 – Tana tour 2026

== Television programs ==
Year	Title	Network	Notes
2023	X Factor	Sky Uno	Contestant (season 17)

== Participation in singing events ==
- Sanremo Giovani (Rai 1)
  - 2024 – Finalist with "La nostra malinconia"
  - 2025 – 1st place with "Mattone"
- Sanremo Music Festival (Rai 1)
  - 2026 – 2nd place in the Newcomers' section with "Mattone"

== Awards and nominations ==
Year	Award		Nomination	Work	Result	Notes
2026	Sanremo Music Festival	"Mia Martini" Critics' Award	"New Proposals" section	"Mattone"	Won	Annual music festival (season 76)
2026	Sanremo Music Festival	Radio-TV-Web Press Room "Lucio Dalla" Award	"New Proposals" section	"Mattone"	Won	Annual music festival (season 76)
2026	Billboard Italia Women in Music		Rising Star	Herself	Won	
