= Mameli (singer) =

Italian singer-songwriter (born 1995)

- Born: Mario Castiglione; 17 May 1995 (age 31); Augusta, Sicily, Italy
- Genres: Indie pop; urban
- Occupations: Singer; songwriter
- Instrument: Vocals
- Years active: 2018–present
- Labels: Hokuto Empire (2018–2021); Sony Music (2018–2023); Capitol (2023–2024); Universal Music Italia (2023–present); EMI (2025–present)

Mario Castiglione (born 17 May 1995), known professionally as Mameli, is an Italian singer-songwriter.

== Early life and education ==
Born in 1995 in Augusta (SR), Mario Castiglione moved to Milan at the age of twenty, where he then began working in the music world. In 2018 he released two singles before adopting the pseudonym Mameli, namely "As if I had never been there and luckily there is sun".

== Career ==
=== 2018-2019: participation in Amici 18 and Inno ===
Mameli rose to fame by participating in the eighteenth edition of the talent show Amici di Maria De Filippi. During his participation, the artist released several unreleased songs, including the most popular "Ci voglio bene". Although he reached the evening segment of the show, he did not win.

At the end of April 2019, his first EP, Inno, was released, followed by other unreleased songs, such as "Latte di mandorla" and "Ancora quando piove", the latter co-written with Alex Britti. Later that year, he embarked on a promotional tour to present his EP to the public.

=== 2019–2020: Amarcord ===
On 29 November 2019 he released the single "Serata banale", followed on 13 December by the collaboration with Scrima on the single "Come quella sera".

On 24 January 2020 he released the single "Non ci sei più", followed on 13 March by the single "Mappa" featuring Meli. On 15 May he released the single "Record", followed on 19 June by the single "Senza di te" featuring the duo Sierra. On 30 October he released his first studio album, Amarcord, which consists of ten tracks, including two collaborations with Alex Britti and Lorenzo Fragola. The single of the same name was released on 6 November.

=== 2021–2023: collaborations and Crepacuore ===
2021 began with her participation in the single "Freddo cane" by the band Rovere, followed by her own single "Non cambi mai" with Blind and Nashley.

The following year, she began an artistic journey with Lorenzo Fragola, with whom she released the singles " Attraverso", "Luna fortuna", "Testa x aria" and "Happy", which preceded their collaborative album Crepacuore, released on 12 May 2023.

=== 2023–present: Fino all'ultimo respiro and Estate blu ===
In December 2023, he returned as a solo artist with the single "Clandestino (S1 E0)". On 16 February 2024, the single "Maledetto ti amo" was released by the collective Piazzabologna, with which he collaborated. On 8 March he released the single "Mai love (S1 E1)", followed on 24 May by the single "Okay okay (S1 E2)", which preceded his second EP Fino all'ultimo respiro, released on 22 November 2024 and consisting of five songs. The single "Mezz'ora d'amore (S1 E3)" was also taken from this latter project.

On 27 June 2025, the single "Serie crime" was released, which preceded his third EP Estate blu, released on 11 July and consisting of four songs. The single "Colpa nostra" was also taken from this latter project.

== Discography ==
=== Studio albums ===
List of albums
Title	Album details
Amarcord	Released: 30 October 2020; Label: Hokuto Empire, Sony Music; Format: CD, digital download, streaming
Crepacuore (with Lorenzo Fragola)	Released: 12 May 2023; Label: Columbia, Sony Music; Format: CD, digital download, streaming

=== Extended plays ===
List of EPs
Title	EP details
Inno	Released: 26 May 2019; Label: Hokuto Empire, Sony Music; Format: digital download, streaming
Fino all'ultimo respiro	Released: 22 November 2024; Label: EMI, Capitol, Universal Music Italia; Format: digital download, streaming
Estate blu	Released: 11 July 2025; Label: EMI, Universal Music Italia; Format: digital download, streaming

=== Singles ===
==== As lead artist ====
List of singles and album name
Title	Year	Album or EP
"Ci vogliamo bene"	2019	Inno
"Latte di mandorla"	2019	Non-album single
"Anche quando piove" (with Alex Britti)	2019	Amarcord
"Serata banale"	2019	Non-album single
"Non ci sei più"	2020	Amarcord
"Mappa" (with Meli)	2020	Non-album single
"Record"	2020	Amarcord
"Senza di te" (with Sierra)	2020	Non-album single
"Amarcord"	2020	Amarcord
"Non cambi mai" (featuring Blind and Nashley)	2021	Non-album single
"Attraverso" (with Lorenzo Fragola)	2022	Crepacuore
"Luna fortuna" (with Lorenzo Fragola)	2022	Crepacuore
"Testa x aria" (with Lorenzo Fragola)	2022	Crepacuore
"Happy" (with Lorenzo Fragola)	2023	Crepacuore
"Clandestino (S1 E0)"	2023	Fino all'ultimo respiro
"Mai love (S1 E1)"	2024	Fino all'ultimo respiro
"Okay okay (S1 E2)"	2024	Fino all'ultimo respiro
"Mezz'ora d'amore (S1 E3)"	2024	Fino all'ultimo respiro
"Serie crime"	2025	Estate blu
"Colpa nostra"	2025	Estate blu

==== As featured artist ====
List of singles and album name
Title	Year	Album
"Come quella sera" (Scrima featuring Mameli)	2019	Fare schifo
"Freddo cane" (Rovere featuring Mameli)	2021	Dalla Terra a Marte
"Maledetto ti amo" (Piazzabologna featuring Mameli)	2024	Municipio V :(

== Songwriting credits ==
List of selected songs co-written by Mameli
Title	Year	Artist(s)	Album or EP
"Fiori d'estate"	2020	Davidof	Non-album singles
"Weekend"	2021	Beatrice Dellacasa	Non-album singles
"Tagadà"	2021	Vipra feat. Cmqmartina and Populous	Simpatico, solare, in cerca di amicizie
"Kamikaze"	2021	Beatrice Dellacasa	Non-album singles
"Belli come prima"	2021	Darte	Non-album singles
"Onde"	2021	Nicol	Non-album singles
"Rosa"	2021	Nashley	Osiride
"Spotify"	2021	Nicol	Non-album singles
"Cenere"	2021	Beatrice Dellacasa	Non-album singles
"Internazionale"	2021	Tish	Under the Dots
"Parafulmine"	2021	Tish	Under the Dots
"Via da me"	2022	Saturno feat. Patrik	Non-album singles
"Tra mille"	2022	Ett	Non-album singles
"Io e te"	2022	Claro feat. Ett	Non-album singles
"Farmaci in bustine"	2022	Giuze	Non-album singles
"Diamanti"	2024	Random	Non-album singles
"Caramelle"	2024	Kaze	Post buio
"1xte1xme"	2025	Lorenzo Fragola	Non-album singles
"Mademoiselle"	2025	Disco Club Paradiso	Non-album singles
"Storte"	2025	Lorenzo Fragola	Non-album singles
"Gipsy"	2025	Michelle Cavallaro	Non-album singles

== Television programs ==
Year	Title	Network	Notes
2018–2019	Amici di Maria De Filippi	Canale 5	Contestant (season 18)
