= Eddie Brock (singer) =

Italian singer and songwriter (born 1997)

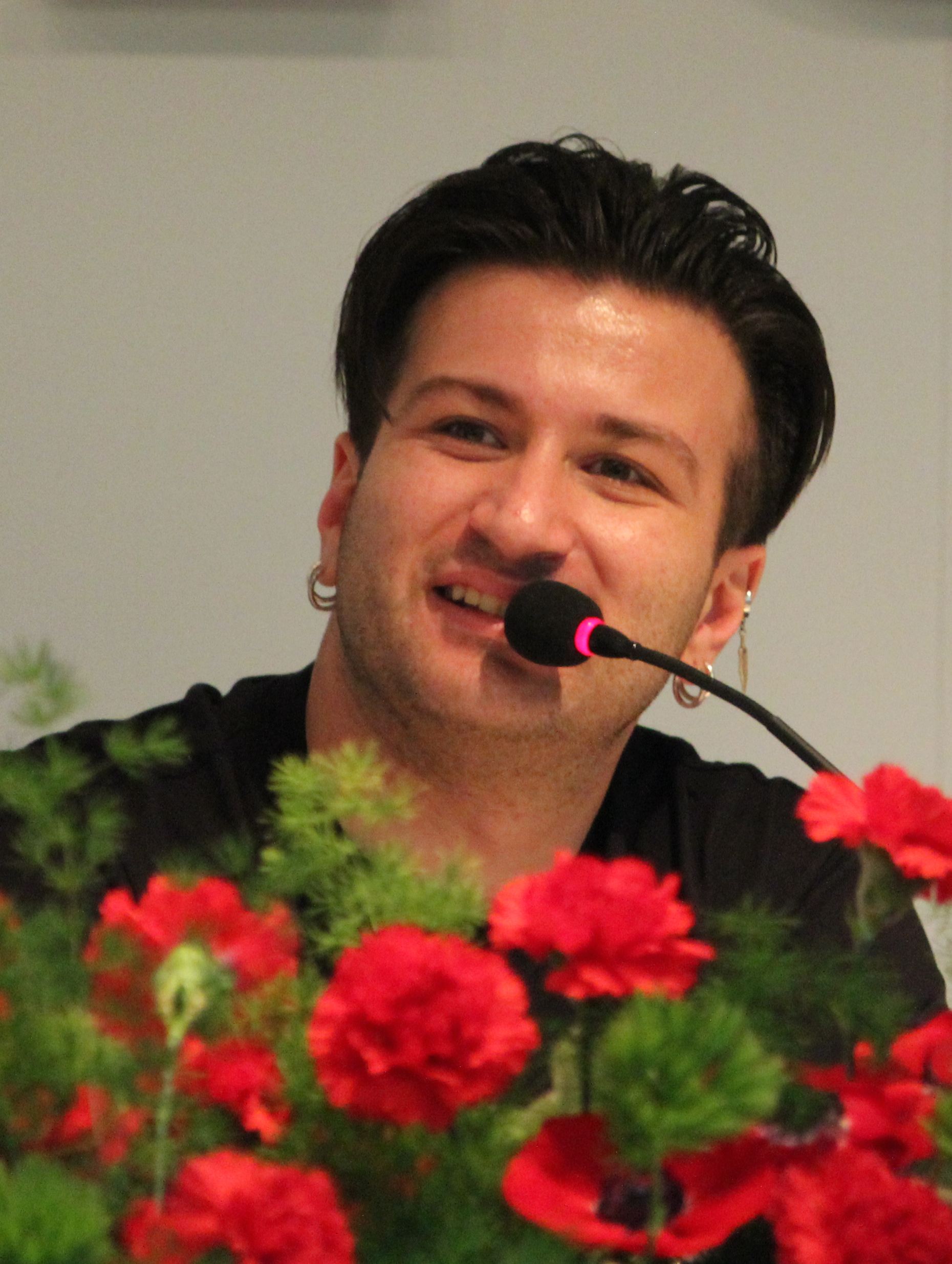
- Eddie Brock in February 2026

Background information
- Born: Edoardo Iaschi; 3 November 1997 (age 28); Rome, Italy
- Genres: Indie rock; indie pop
- Occupations: Singer; songwriter
- Instruments: Vocals; guitar
- Years active: 2018–present
- Labels: Sangita / Universal Music Italia (2022–2024); Warner Music Italy / Atlantic Italy (2025–present)

Edoardo Iaschi (born 3 November 1997), known professionally as Eddie Brock, is an Italian singer-songwriter.

== Early life and education ==
Raised in a family with no musical traditions, Brock attended a classical high school and subsequently worked various jobs, including delivery driver, call center operator, and vacation rental manager. At the same time, he cultivated his passion for music, writing songs and performing in small venues with few spectators. His stage name is a tribute to the Marvel Comics character of the same name, the alter ego of Venom.

== Career ==
In 2018, Brock began performing in various music contests and festivals, including Coca-Cola Future Legend, where he joined the team led by Annalisa and participated in various live stages. In April 2023, he released his debut EP, Roma dorme, from which the singles "A festa finita", "FM 105 e te", and "Sere nate" were released.

On 2 May 2025, Brock released his debut album, Amarsi è la rivoluzione, which includes the track "Non è mica te". The song went viral on the social media platform TikTok and entered the Viral Top 50 Italy on Spotify.

On 30 November 2025, Brock was announced among the participants of the Sanremo Music Festival 2026. He competed with the song "Avvoltoi", where he placed 30th.

== Discography ==
=== Studio albums ===
- Amarsi è la rivoluzione (2025)

=== EPs ===
- Roma dorme (2023)

=== Singles ===
- "Ma tu, ma io" (2019)
- "Lei non sa" (2021)
- "Dueminutiediciasette" (2021)
- "Sguardo lume" (with Roadelli) (2022)
- "A festa finita" (2022)
- "FM 105 e te" (2022)
- "Ricordi ricamati" (with Roadelli) (2022)
- "Sere nate" (2023)
- "Lungomare a Napoli" (2023)
- "Tarocchi" (2024)
- "Matematica" (2024)
- "Maledettamente" (2024)
- "Promettimi" (2025)
- "Far West" (featuring Mille)
- "Non è mica te" (2025)
- "Avvoltoi" (2026)
