= Opera (Patty Pravo song) =

Song performed by Italian singer Patty Pravo

Single by Patty Pravo

from the album Opera
- Released: 25 February 2026
- Genre: Pop
- Length: 3:42
- Label: NAR International; Warner Music Group
- Songwriter: Giovanni Caccamo
- Producers: Giovanni Caccamo; Taketo Gohara

Patty Pravo singles chronology
| "Ratatan" (2025) | "Opera" (2026) | "Ti lascio una canzone" (2026) |

Music video
- "Opera" on YouTube

"Opera" is a song performed by Italian singer Patty Pravo, written by Giovanni Caccamo. It was released as the third single from her 2026 album of the same name.

The song was inspired by a dream of her friend and assistant Simone Folco who then approached Caccamo with the idea. Pravo stated that the song tells about "the unity of us all in this world, because we all are unique works of art".

The singer performed "Opera" at the 76th Sanremo Music Festival in February 2026 where it placed 24th. The song and the accompanying music video premiered during the festival, but the original video was shortly replaced with a new edit which was part of the singer's collaboration with car manufacturer Lancia.

== Charts ==
| Chart (2026) | Peak position |
|---|---|
| Italy (FIMI) | 82 |
