= Animali notturni =

2026 single by Malika Ayane

Single by Malika Ayane
- Released: 25 February 2026
- Genre: Dance-pop
- Length: 2:58
- Label: Carosello; Believe
- Composers: Edwyn Roberts; Stefano Marletta; Luca Faraone; Federico Mercuri; Giordano Cremona
- Lyricists: Malika Ayane; Edwyn Roberts; Stefano Marletta
- Producer: Merk & Kremont

Malika Ayane singles chronology
| "L'avresti detto mai" (2025) | "Animali notturni" (2026) |

"Animali notturni" ("Nocturnal Animals") is a song co-written and recorded by Italian singer Malika Ayane, released on 25 February 2026.

The song was presented in competition during the Sanremo Music Festival 2026.

== Background and release ==
"Animali notturni" was written by Ayane herself with Vincenzo Luca Faraone, Stefano Marletta, Edwyn Clark Roberts, Giordano Cremona and Federico Mercuri. The song marks the first single released with Carosello Records. The singer explained the meaning of the song and the choice to change label and how it is the result of an artistic journey born from the experience in the theatre with the traditional reinterpretation of Brokeback Mountain.

"Animali notturni" was released in digital and streaming format on 25 February 2026. The single was re-released on a 45 rpm vinyl record as the A-side and a version performed with the French trio Dov'è Liana on the B-side.

== Music video ==
The video for "Animali notturni", directed by Matteo Maggi, was published at the same time as the single's release through Ayane's YouTube channel.

== Promotion ==
Italian broadcaster RAI organised the 76th edition of the Sanremo Music Festival between 24 and 28 February 2026. On 30 November 2025, Ayane was announced among the participants of the festival, with the title of her competing entry revealed the following 14 December.

== Charts ==
Chart performance for "Animali notturni"
| Chart (2026) | Peak position |
|---|---|
| Italy (FIMI) | 25 |
| Italy Airplay (EarOne) | 20 |
