= Nayt =

Italian rapper (born 1994)

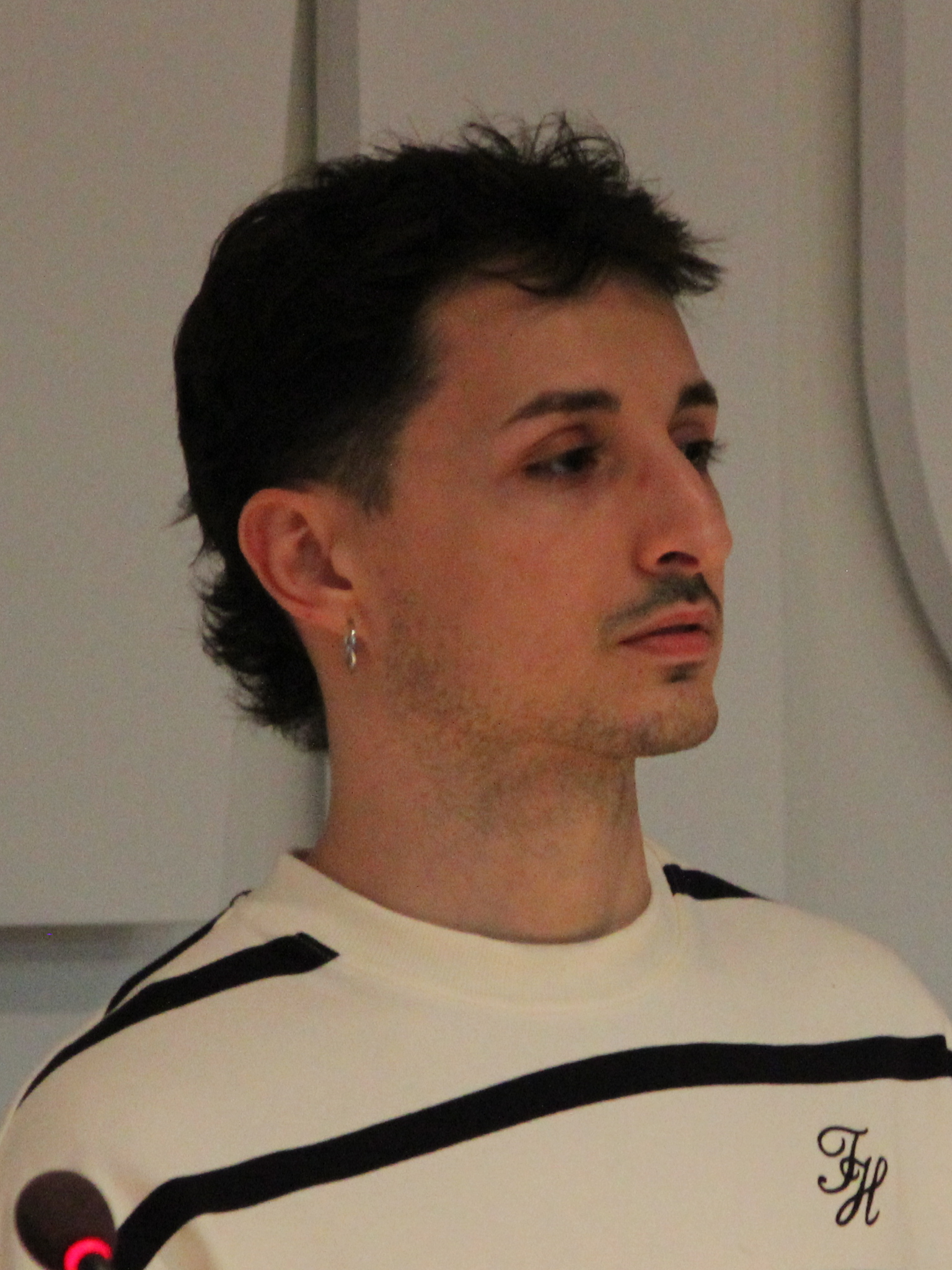
- Nayt in February 2026

Background information
- Born: William Mezzanotte; 9 November 1994 (age 31); Isernia, Molise, Italy
- Genres: Hip hop; pop rap
- Occupations: Rapper; singer; songwriter
- Instrument: Vocals
- Years active: 2009–present
- Labels: Columbia; Jive; Sony Music; VNT1

William Mezzanotte (born 9 November 1994), known professionally as Nayt, is an Italian rapper and singer-songwriter.

== Life and career ==
He debuted in 2011 with the single "No Story" and his first album titled Nayt One was released on 7 May 2012. Nayt is best known for his trilogy Raptus (2015), Raptus 2 (2017) and Raptus 3 (2019), re-released in a collection box edition by Jive Records on 10 May 2019. He has released another trilogy of albums between 2020 and 2023 which are Mood, Doom and Habitat.

On 30 November 2025, he was announced among the participants of the Sanremo Music Festival 2026, competing with the song "Prima che".

On 20 March 2026 he released his highly anticipated album Io individuo, which charted at number one in Italy.

== Discography ==
=== Albums ===
- Nayt One (2012)
- Shitty Life Mixtape (2013)
- Six of Sixteen (EP; 2014)
- Raptus (2015)
- Un bacio (2016)
- Raptus 2 (2017)
- Raptus 3 (2019)
- Mood (2020)
- Doom (2021)
- Habitat (2023)
- Lettera Q (2024)
- Io individuo (2026)
