= Tära =

Italian singer-songwriter (born 2003)

Tära تارا
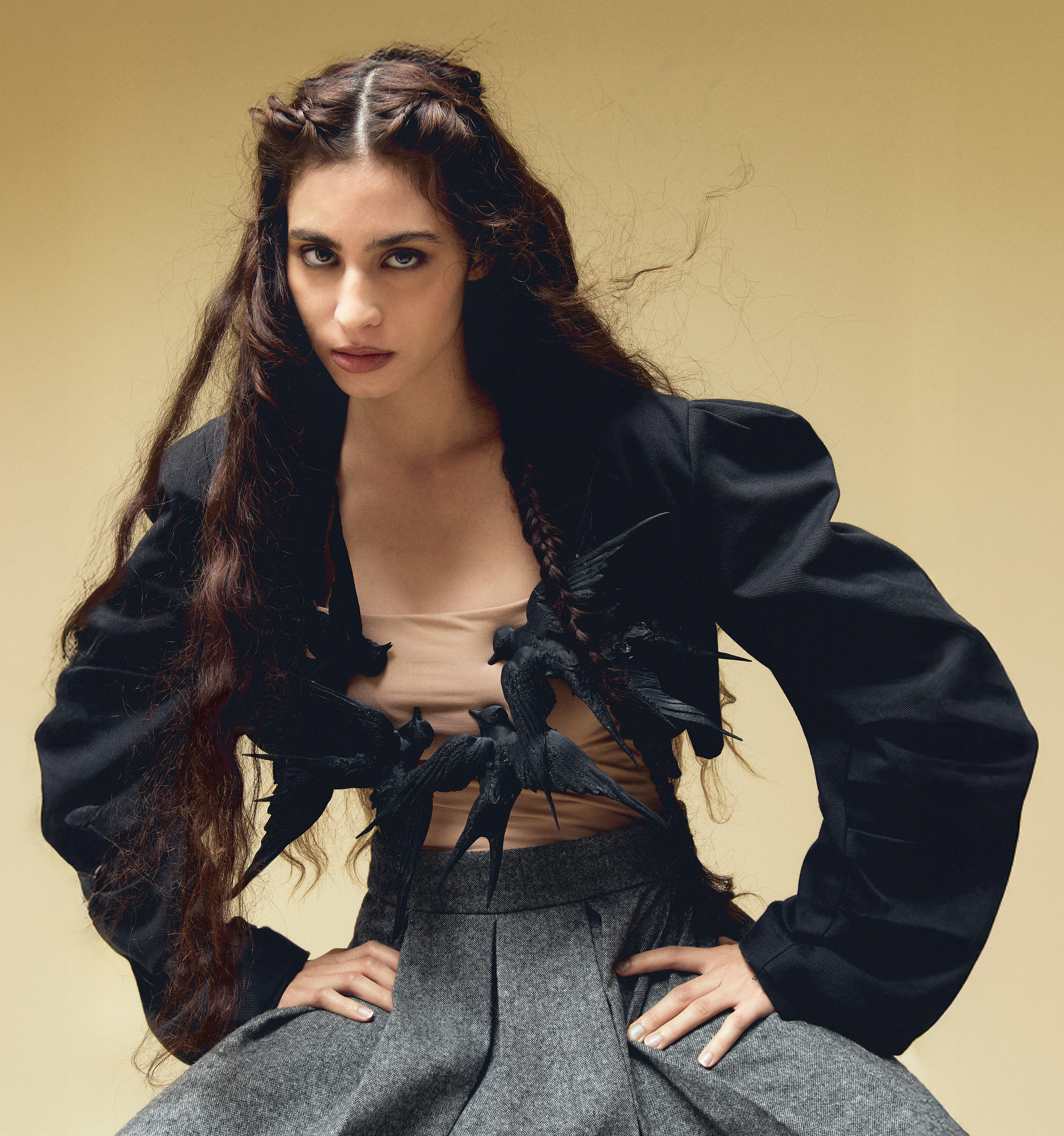
- Tära in January 2026

Background information
- Born: Tamara Al Zool; 29 January 2003 (age 23); Cassino, Lazio, Italy
- Origin: Sant'Apollinare, Lazio, Italy
- Genres: Contemporary R&B; alternative R&B; Arab pop
- Occupations: Singer; songwriter
- Instrument: Vocals
- Years active: 2022–present
- Labels: Troppo Records; Epic Records
- Publishers: Troppo Records; Digital Noises; The Orchard

Tamara Al Zool (Arabic: تمارا الزول; born 29 January 2003), known professionally as Tära (stylised in all caps; Arabic: تارا), is a Palestinian-Italian singer-songwriter.

== Early life ==
Tamara Al Zool was born in Cassino, in the Province of Frosinone, to Palestinian refugee parents who came to Italy as university students. Her grandparents were expelled from their homeland during the Nakba in 1948, even though some of her family still resides in the Gaza Strip. She grew up in Sant'Apollinare, Frosinone, taking singing classes between the ages of 14 and 20 and starting to write music at 16.

== Career ==
Al Zool began releasing her music on SoundCloud in 2022. In 2024, she was among the finalists of a contest to select acts for the May Day Concert in Rome. That same year, she rose to prominence on social media, being featured on Spotify playlists and participating in the platform's Equal project, promoting female artists. She subsequently took part in the eighteenth edition of the Italian X Factor in 2024, where she passed the audition stage with a performance of "7 Rings" by Ariana Grande and entered Paola Iezzi's team; however, she was eliminated shortly afterwards, failing to reach the finals.

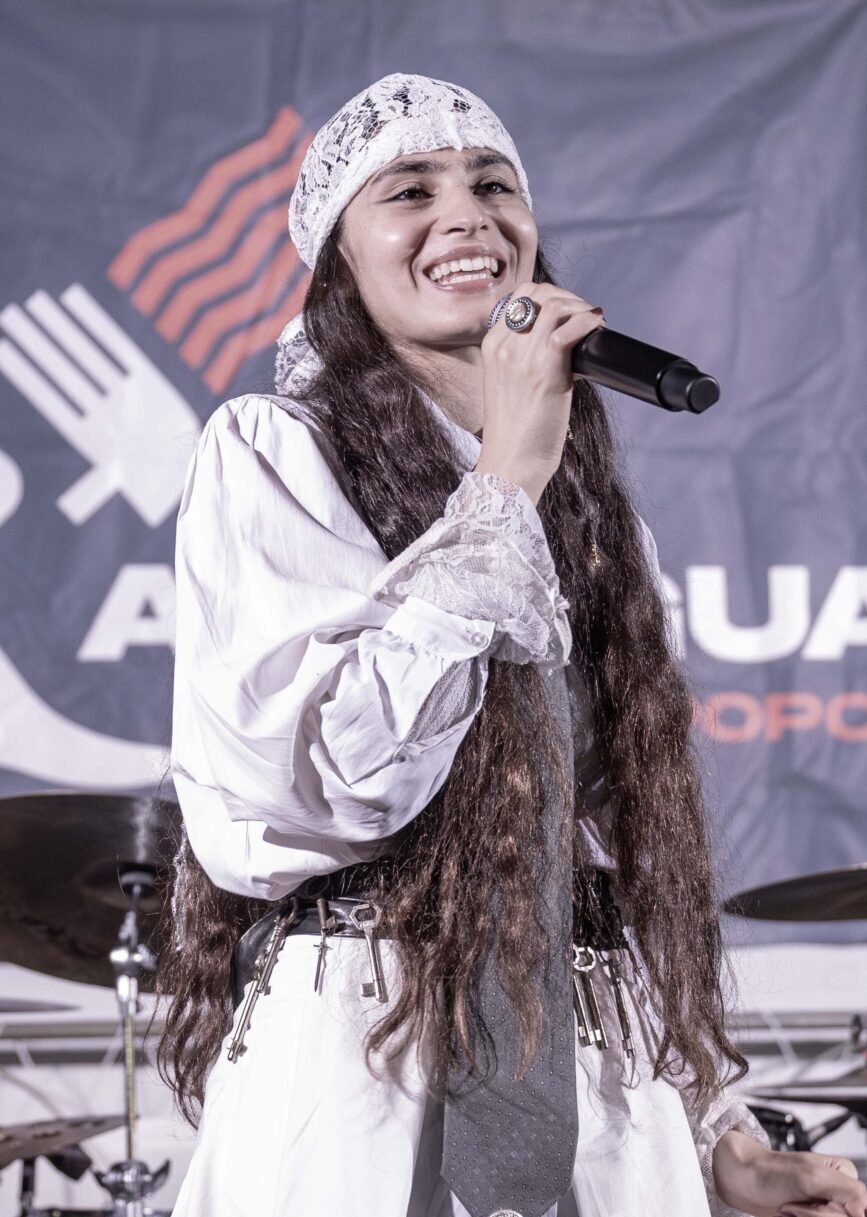
Tära performing in June 2025

In 2025, amid increasing popularity after her single "Araba fenice" ("Arab Phoenix"), she embarked on an eponymous tour and took part in several music festivals in the country.

In October 2025, her song "Mezzaluna" ("Crescent") was among the shortlisted entries for Sanremo Giovani, a selection event for the Sanremo Music Festival 2026, although she did not advance to the televised stage of the competition. The song was released the following January as the lead single from her upcoming debut EP Zefiro, released in May 2026. She then embarked on a European tour the following summer. In late October 2026, she released the single "La Dolce Vita", a collaboration with Clean Bandit.

== Artistry ==
Tära's style, which she refers to as "Arab'n'B", has been described as a blend of contemporary R&B with Arab sounds, sometimes including urban or dabke. She has cited influences from international artists like Michael Jackson, Beyoncé, Shakira, Ariana Grande, Adele, Usher, M.I.A., Sevdaliza, FKA Twigs, Umm Kulthum, Fairuz, Giorgia and Elisa, as well as from Palestinian poet Mahmoud Darwish and Palestinian culture in general; she has expressed fondness for Gemitaiz, Mace, Gaia, Venerus, Joan Thiele, Metro Boomin, Tyler, the Creator and Rosalía, with all of whom she would collaborate. A multilingual artist, she sings in Italian, English and Arabic.

Tära often performs in traditional Palestinian attire, usually featuring tatreez embroidery and Palestinian keys; and occasionally also wears henna tattoos on stage. Some of her stage costumes have been created by herself and by Lebanese designer Sandra Rizq.

The two dots on the ⟨ä⟩ of Tära's stage name reference those on the Arabic letter tāʾ (ت), which is the initial of her given name Tamara, as well as the ⟨oo⟩ digraph of her last name Al Zool.

== Discography ==
=== EPs ===
- Zefiro – 2026

=== Singles ===
- "In My Head" – 2022
- "Alive" – 2022
- "Déjà vu" – 2022
- "Il mio amore no" – 2023
- "Luna" – 2023
- "Jada" – 2023
- "Why" – 2023
- "Fossili" – 2023
- "Uguale a me" – 2023
- "Natural State of Trip" – 2023
- "French Energy" – 2023
- "All I Got" – 2023
- "Strangers" – 2023
- "Evadere" – 2024
- "Blun7 a Swishland" – 2024
- "Revenge" – 2024
- "Streets" – 2024
- "Peace of Mind" (feat. K-Ruz) – 2024
- "Sotto effetto" – 2024
- "Araba fenice" – 2024
- "Phoenix" – 2024
- "Dunya" – 2024
- "Ana Bali" (feat. Livio Cori) – 2025
- "Bella Ciao (Palestinian Version)" – 2025
- "Farti fuori" – 2025
- "Ya'aburnee" – 2025
- "Ya Helwe Ciao" – 2025
- "Offline" – 2025
- "Mezzaluna" – 2026
- "Diaspora" – 2026
- "L'ultimo coccodrillo" (with Westcross) – 2026
- "La Dolce Vita" (with Clean Bandit) – 2026
