= Antonia (Italian singer) =

Italian singer-songwriter (born 2005)

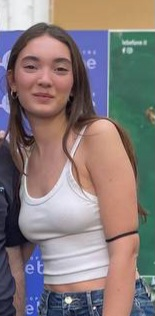
- Antonia in May 2025

Background information
- Born: Antonia Nocca; 19 October 2005 (age 20); Naples, Campania, Italy
- Genres: Pop; R&B
- Occupations: Singer; songwriter
- Instruments: Vocals; piano
- Years active: 2024–present
- Labels: Eclectic / Warner Music Italy (2024–2025); Epic / Sony Music (2025–present)

Antonia Nocca (born 19 October 2005), known professionally by the mononym Antonia, is an Italian singer-songwriter.

== Early life and education ==
Raised in the Materdei neighborhood of Naples with her sister Lorenza, she is the second daughter of Carmen Garzillo and Giuseppe "Pino" Nocca.

She discovered music at the age of six while attending Onorato Fava Elementary School in her hometown. Around the same time, she began taking singing lessons and then performing on stage, and by the age of ten she was already singing in Neapolitan. In July 2024, she graduated from the Gian Battista Vico State Classical Lyceum in her hometown.

== Career ==
In November 2024, she joined the cast of the twenty-fourth edition of Canale 5's musical talent show Amici di Maria De Filippi, entering the initial phase. In February 2025, she entered the series phase of the show by joining professor Rudy Zerbi's team and in May of the following year she reached the final, where she finished fourth and won the Spotify Singles Award (awarded during the semi-final), the Enel Critics' Award and the Unicità Oreo Award.

During the show, she released several new songs, including "Giganti", "Dove ti trovi tu", "Romantica" and "Relax", all four of which were later included in her debut EP, Relax, released on 24 May 2025 by Ecletic Records and Warner Music Italy, which also includes the songs "Le curve" and "Weekend". The EP debuted at number thirty-seven on the FIMI Albums Chart. In the summer of that same year, she performed at several musical events, including TIM Summer Hits, Battiti Live, Yoga Radio Bruno Estate and RDS Summer Festival.

On 24 October "Genie in a Bottle" was released for Spotify, a reinterpretation of the 1999 song of the same name by Christina Aguilera. In the same month she was chosen to compete in Sanremo Giovani 2025, the youth selection for the Sanremo Music Festival 2026, with the song "Luoghi perduti". After making it through the first round and the semifinal, she reached the final where she was eliminated. On 22 May 2026 Aiello's album Scorpione was released, in which Antonia collaborated on the track "Fiammiferi". On 5 June the single "Obbligo o verità" was released.

== Personal life ==
In 2025 she started dating singer Cristiana Carella, known as Senza Cri, whom she met during her participation on the twenty-fourth edition of Amici di Maria De Filippi. Coincidentally, Carella also entered Sanremo Giovani 2025 going on to reach the final like Nocca.

== Discography ==
=== Extended plays ===
List of EPs and with selected chart positions
Title	EP details	Peak chart positions
Title	EP details	ITA
Relax	Released: 24 May 2025; Label: Eclectic, Warner Music Italy; Format: CD, digital download, streaming	37

=== Singles ===
==== As lead artist ====
List of singles and album name
Title	Year	Album or EP
"Giganti"	2024	Relax
"Dove ti trovi tu"	2025	Relax
"Romantica"	2025	Relax
"Relax"	2025	Relax
"Genie in a Bottle"	2025	Non-album singles
"Luoghi perduti"	2025	Non-album singles
"Obbligo o verità"	2026	Non-album singles

=== Collaborations ===
List of singles as featured artist
Title	Year	Album or EP
"Fiammiferi" (Aiello featuring Antonia)	2026	Scorpione

== Television programs ==
Year	Title	Network	Role(s)	Notes
2024–2025	Amici di Maria De Filippi	Canale 5	Herself / Contestant	Talent show (season 24) – Fourth place

== Participation in singing events ==
- Sanremo Giovani (Rai 1)
  - 2025 – Finalist with "Luoghi perduti"

== Awards and nominations ==
Year	Award	Nomination	Work	Result	Notes
2025	Amici di Maria De Filippi	Spotify Singles Award (season 24)	Herself	Won	
2025	Amici di Maria De Filippi	Enel Critics' Award (season 24)	Herself	Won	
2025	Amici di Maria De Filippi	Unicità Oreo Award (season 24)	Herself	Won	
