= Mazzariello (singer) =

Italian singer-songwriter (born 2001)

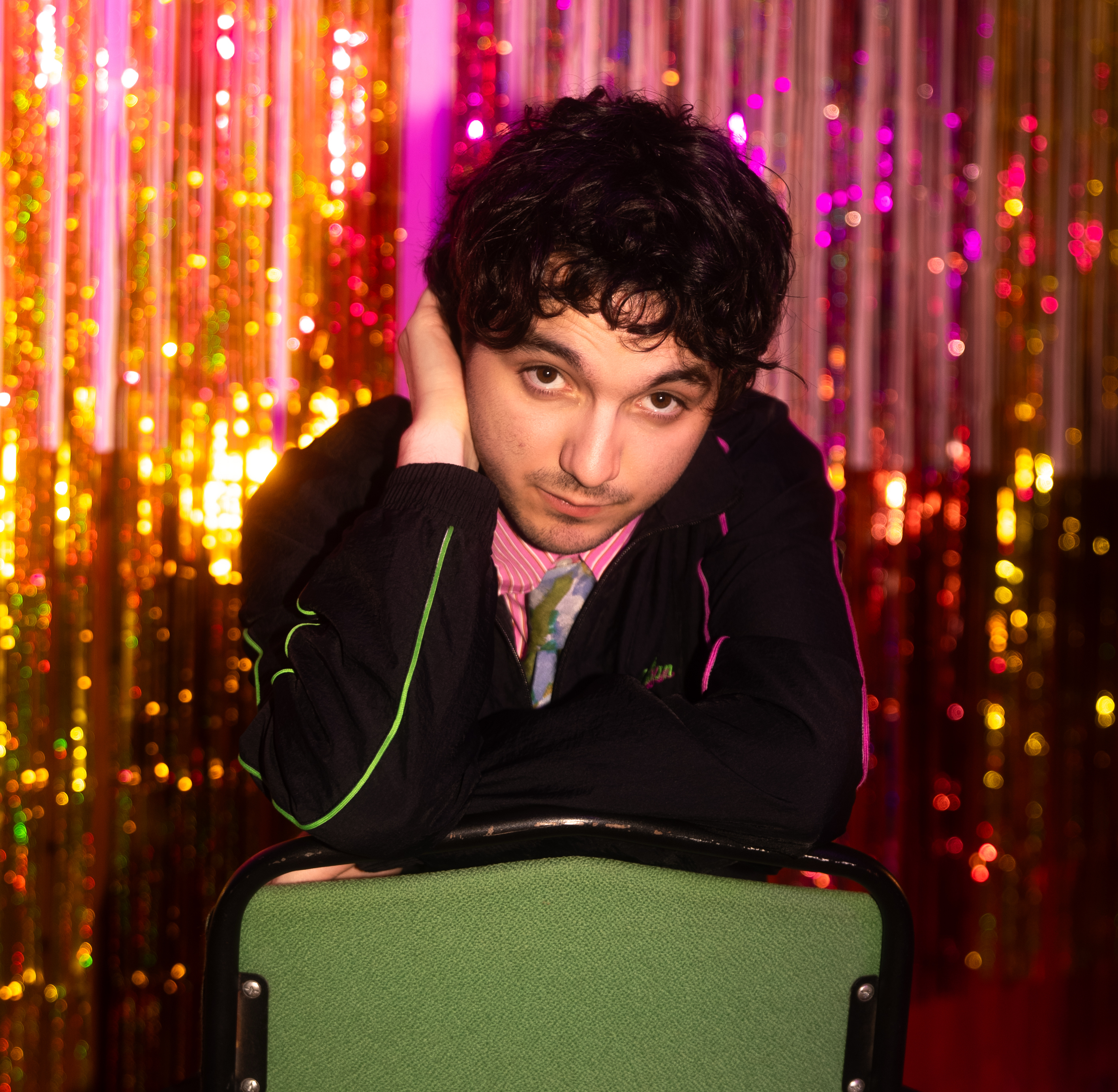
- Mazzariello in April 2025

Background information
- Born: Antonio Mazzariello; 12 September 2001 (age 24); Scafati, Campania, Italy
- Genres: Indie pop
- Occupations: Singer; songwriter
- Instruments: Vocals; guitar; piano
- Years active: 2021–present
- Labels: Futura Dischi; Epic/Sony

Antonio Mazzariello (born 12 September 2001), known mononymously as Mazzariello, is an Italian singer-songwriter.

== Career ==
Mazzariello began releasing music in 2021, being selected by Spotify among the leading indie artists. Upon signing a contract with Futura Dischi in 2022, some of his songs were included in the soundtrack for the Netflix series Summertime 3.

His debut EP Ufficio oggetti smarriti was followed by a mini-tour in early 2023 and a summer tour. After the release of his second EP Antisommossa he performed in the 2024 May 1st Concert at the Circus Maximus in Rome, and embarked on a second tour.

Later that year, he was selected to compete in Sanremo Giovani 2024 (a selection event for the Sanremo Music Festival 2025) with the song "Amarsi per lavoro", reaching the semi-final of December 2024 where he was eliminated.

Mazzariello was among the ten winning acts of the Area Sanremo contest on 12 December 2025, and the following day he was selected to compete in the Newcomers' section of the Sanremo Music Festival 2026. His entry, titled "Manifestazione d'amore", was eliminated in the semi-final.

== Discography ==
=== EP ===
- Ufficio oggetti smarriti – 2023
- Antisommossa – 2024

=== Singles ===
- "Rumori" – 2020
- "Atmosfera" – 2020
- "Due minuti" – 2021
- "Pubblicità progresso" – 2021
- "Funamboli" – 2021
- "Chissà" – 2022
- "Vertigini" – 2022
- "Non chiamarmi amore" – 2022
- "Bambini per sempre" (feat. Altea) – 2022
- "Blindati" – 2024
- "Finestre verdi" – 2024
- "Amarsi per lavoro" – 2024
- "Nostalgia & karaoke" – 2025
- "Per un milione di euro" – 2025
- "Manifestazione d'amore" – 2025
