= Caro Wow =

Italian singer-songwriter (born 1999)

- Born: Carolina Spreti; 1999 (age 26–27); Milan, Lombardy, Italy
- Genre: Pop
- Occupations: Singer; songwriter
- Instrument: Vocals
- Years active: 2021–present
- Labels: Believe Music; EMI; Universal Music Italia

Carolina Spreti (born 1999), known professionally as Caro Wow, is an Italian singer-songwriter.

== Early life and education ==
Born in Milan in 1999, she began recording her first songs as a teenager. Her stage name was initially Caro Wav, inspired by audio files. She later decided to change her stage name to Caro Wow after a friend mistakenly called her that.

During her childhood, she was influenced by the music of Italian artists such as Claudio Baglioni, Fabrizio De André, Gianna Nannini, Mina, and as she grew older, she was also inspired by international artists such as Billie Eilish, Charli XCX, Rosalía and Superorganism. This mix of influences helped shape her unique style, labeled cyber-pop.

== Career ==
In 2021 she released her first single, "Miss", followed in 2022 by the singles "Città" and "Sad". In the same year he collaborated on the singles "Amarcord" by Venz and "Ecco perché" by See Maw. On 31 December she released her first EP "Tutto in una notte", containing nine tracks.

On 27 January 2023 the single "Il concerto delle ex" by Grill Boys, on which he collaborated by See Maw, was released. On 26 May she released the single "Il tuo gatto", followed on 14 July by the single "Loser". On 10 November the single "Quello che mi fai" was released. The single "Dark Room" was released on 26 January 2024, followed on 21 June by the single "Pagine bianche" in collaboration with Edonico. Estremo's single "Lovesick", on which he collaborated, was released on 13 July.

On 14 March 2025, she released the single "Cosplay Love", followed on 4 April by the single "Occhi grandi". The two songs preceded her second EP, "Mezza morta", containing seven tracks. On May 23 the single "My Bed" was released. On 6 October the single "M'ama non m'ama" by Mocci, on which he collaborated, was released. In the same month she was selected to participate in Sanremo Giovani 2025, the youth competition for the Sanremo Music Festival 2026, with the song "Cupido". After making it through the first round, she reached the semifinal where she was eliminated.

== Discography ==
=== Extended plays ===
List of EPs
Title	EP details
Tutto in una notte	Released: 31 December 2022; Label: Believe Music; Formats: CD, digital download, streaming
Mezza morta	Released: 18 April 2025; Label: EMI, Universal Music Italia; Formats: CD, digital download, streaming

=== Singles ===
==== As lead artist ====
List of singles and album name
Title	Year	Album or EP
"Miss"	2021	Non-album singles
"Città"	2022	Non-album singles
"Sad"	2022	Non-album singles
"Il tuo gatto"	2023	Non-album singles
"Loser"	2023	Non-album singles
"Quello che mi fai"	2023	Non-album singles
"Dark Room"	2024	Non-album singles
"Pagine bianche"(featuring Edonico)	2024	Non-album singles
"Cosplay Love"	2025	Mezza morta
"Occhi grandi"	2025	Mezza morta
"My Bad"	2025	Mezza morta
"Cupido"	2025	Non-album single

==== As featured artist ====
List of singles and album name
Title	Year	Album
"Amarcord" (Venz featuring Caro Wow)	2022	Non-album singles
"Ecco perché" (Grill Boys featuring See Maw and Caro Wow)	2022	Non-album singles
"Il concerto delle ex" (Grill Boys featuring Caro Wow)	2023	Blob
"Lovesick" (Estremo featuring Caro Wow)	2024	Era
"M'ama non m'ama" (Caro Wow featuring Caro Wow)	2025	Non-album single

== Participation in singing events ==
- Sanremo Giovani (Rai 2)
  - 2025 – Participant with "Cupido"
