= Giorgia Cardinaletti =

Italian journalist and television presenter (born 1987)

- Born: 23 April 1987 (age 39); Fabriano, Marche, Italy
- Education: University of Perugia
- Occupations: Journalist; television presenter
- Height: 1.72 m (5 ft 7.72 in)

Giorgia Cardinaletti (born 23 April 1987) is an Italian journalist and television presenter.

== Life and career ==
She graduated from the "Francesco Stelluti" state classical high school in Fabriano and earned a degree in literature with a focus on history from the University of Perugia. After completing her studies at the School of Radio and Television Journalism in Perugia, she has been a professional journalist registered with the Lazio Order of Journalists since 2012.

She was a correspondent and then a presenter at Rai News 24. In 2016, after making a name for herself as a Formula 1 correspondent and host of the program Pole Position, she was chosen to host La domenica sportiva, a program she held until 2019.

In August 2019, she moved to TG1, first hosting the 60 secondi and late-night editions, and subsequently the mid-evening edition. In February 2020, during the week of the Sanremo Music Festival 2020, she hosted Dentro il Festival on RaiPlay, the press conference held the day after each evening of the festival.

Long involved in daily news reporting during the COVID-19 pandemic, in January 2022 she was entrusted with hosting the in-depth journalism program Via delle storie, airing Monday evenings on Rai 1.

Since June 2022, she has hosted the 8:00 p.m. edition of TG1.

In 2025 and 2026 she took part in the RAI series Minimarket, starring Kevin Spacey. On 28 February 2026 will co-host the final night of the Sanremo Music Festival 2026.

== Television programs ==
Year	Title	Network	Rol
2012–2016	Rai News 24	Rai News 24	Host
2016–2017	Pole Position	Rai 1	Host
2016–2019	La domenica sportiva	Rai 2	Host
2019–present	TG1	Rai 1	Host
2020	Dentro il Festival	RaiPlay	Host
2020–2021	Telethon	Rai 1	Host
2022	Via delle storie	Rai 1	Host
2023–2024	TG1 Mattina Estate	Rai 1	Host
2025	Oscars - La notte in diretta	Rai 1	Sent
2025	Un racconto infinito	Rai 1	Host
2025	Premio Campiello	Rai 5	Host
2025	Prima della Scala	Rai 1	Sent
2026	Sanremo Music Festival 2026	Rai 1	Co-host

== Filmography ==
=== Web TV ===
Year	Title	Platform	Notes
2025–2026	Minimarket	RaiPlay	TV series, 4 episodes

== Radio ==
Year	Title	Network	Notes
2024–present	Back2Back	Rai Radio 2	Host

== Awards and nominations ==
Year	Award	Category	Result	Notes
2019	TV Journalist of the Year Award		Won	
2023	Guidarello Award	Authorial journalism in Ravenna	Won	
2024	Golden Bartolo Award	University of Perugia	Won	
