= Ema Stokholma =

French-Italian DJ and radio/television presenter (born 1983)

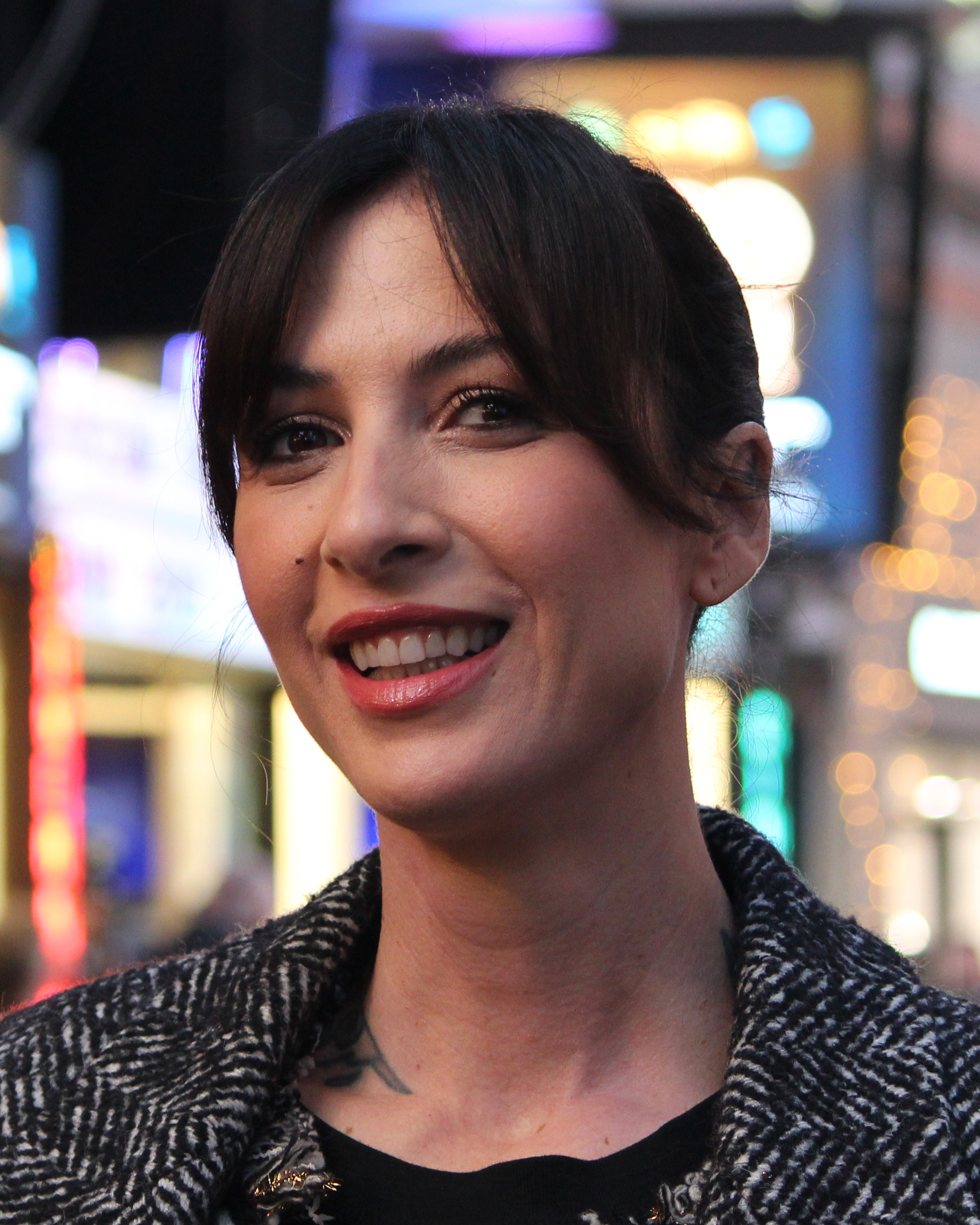
- Ema Stokholma at the Sanremo Music Festival 2026
- Born: Morwenn Moguerou; 9 December 1983 (age 42); Rhône-Alpes, France
- Citizenship: Italy; France
- Occupations: DJ; TV and radio hostess; writer

Morwenn Moguerou (born 9 December 1983), known professionally as Ema Stokholma, is a French-Italian DJ, TV and radio hostess, and writer.

== Life and career ==
Morwenn Moguerou was born in 1983 in Rhône-Alpes, France, to a French mother and an Italian father, who left the family. Moguerou ran away from home at the age of 15 due to constant physical and moral abuse from her mother. She travelled across Europe and reconciled with her father in Italy in the late 1990s. In 2000, she settled in Milan, and pursued a career as a DJ. Around 2009, she took the stage name Ema Stokholma. She became known in the music world and in 2013 hosted the aftershow of the MTV Italian Awards.

Since 2013, she has hosted various TV and radio shows in Italy, including Jump! Stasera mi tuffo, Stranger Tape in Town, Aggratis!, Back2Back, Esordi, Let's Play, Radio 2 Social Club, and many more.

In 2020 she released her autobiography Per il mio bene, which brought her a prestigious Italian literature award Premio Bancarella.

In 2020, she hosted Prima Festival, the mini-show of the Sanremo Festival. In 2025, and 2026 she was the main host who led the opening and closing ceremonies of the 20th and 21st Rome Film Festival.
