= Stella stellina =

2026 single by Ermal Meta

Single by Ermal Meta

from the album Funzioni vitali
- Language: Italian
- Released: 25 February 2026
- Genre: Worldbeat
- Length: 3:18
- Label: Columbia; Sony Music
- Composers: Ermal Meta; Gianni Pollex; Dario Faini
- Lyricist: Ermal Meta
- Producer: Dardust

Ermal Meta singles chronology
"DeLorean" (2025)	"Stella stellina" (2026)

"Stella stellina" ("Star, Little Star") is a song co-written and recorded by Italian singer Ermal Meta, released on 25 February 2026 through Columbia and Sony Music as the second single from his sixth studio album, Funzioni vitali.

The song was presented in competition during the Sanremo Music Festival 2026.

== Background ==
"Stella stellina" was written by Meta himself and composed by him alongside Giovanni Pollex and Dario Faini (Dardust), the latter also acting as producer. Having marked the singer's sixth participation in the Sanremo Music Festival, in an interview given to Radio Italia, he stated that the song "was born from a nursery rhyme we all know. The question is what happens when you mix a nursery rhyme with children in a situation where children meet a tragic end." More specifically, Meta explained that the song recounts the story of a child killed by Israel during its war on Gaza.

== Promotion ==
Italian broadcaster RAI organised the 76th edition of the Sanremo Music Festival between 24 and 28 February 2026. On 30 November 2025, Meta was announced among the participants of the festival, with the title of his competing entry revealed the following 14 December.

== Charts ==
Chart performance for "Stella stellina"
Chart (2026)	Peak position
Italy (FIMI)	20
Italy Airplay (EarOne)	49
