= Cmqmartina =

Italian singer-songwriter (born 1999)

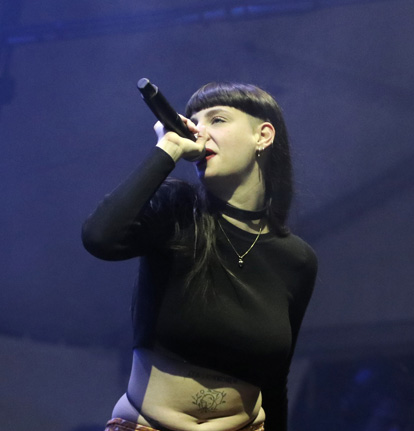
- Cmqmartina in May 2022

Background information
- Born: Martina Sironi; 21 April 1999 (age 27); Monza, Lombardy, Italy
- Genres: Synth-pop; Electropop
- Occupations: Singer; songwriter
- Instruments: Vocals; guitar; piano
- Years active: 2019–present
- Labels: La Clinica Dischi; RCA; Columbia; Sony Music

Martina Sironi (born 21 April 1999), known professionally as Cmqmartina, (Note: Read as Comunque Martina, Italian for 'Martina Anyway'.) is an Italian singer-songwriter.

== Life and career ==
Born in 1999 in Monza, she began studying music in fifth grade. She made her debut in May 2019 with the single "Lasciami andare!", which achieved growing success in the club and independent music scene, entering radio rotation in October.

During 2019 she released two other singles, "Lago blu" and "Carne per cani" and embarked on her first tour between the months of November and December, the Lasciami andare tour, which anticipated and promoted the release of her debut album, Disco, which took place on 28 February 2020.

In 2020 she took part in the fourteenth edition of the talent show X Factor, where she presented the two new singles "Serpente" and "Sparami", both of which ranked in the national hit parade, and ranked sixth, being eliminated during the fifth episode without being able to access the semi-final. The following year, she released Disco 2, her second studio album, through the Italian label Sony Music, which was promoted by a tour with stops in Finland, Italy and Switzerland. In August, she won the Giovani MEI award.

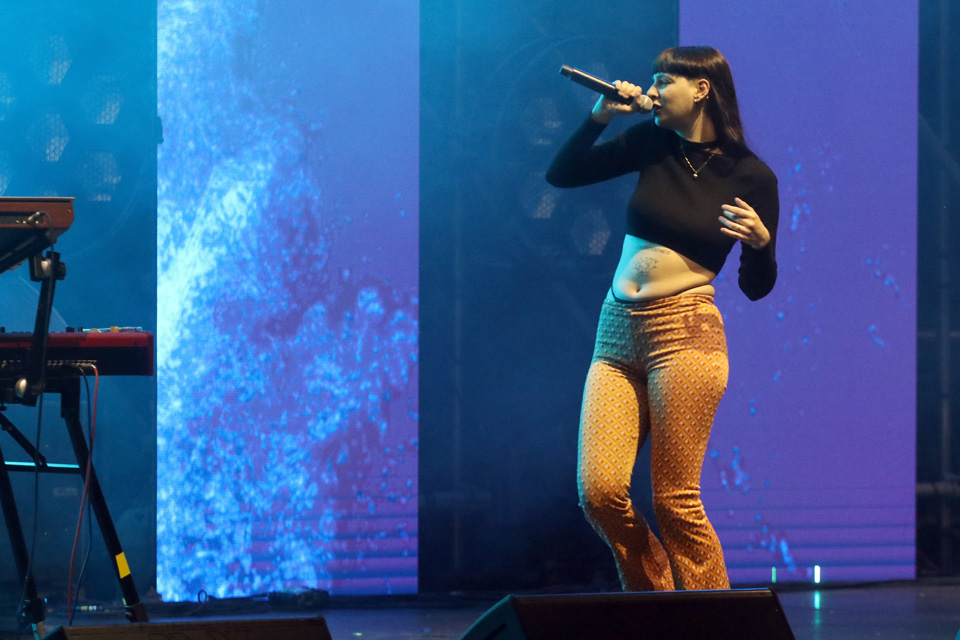
Cmqmartina performing at the Eurovision Village in Parco del Valentino, Turin, ahead of the Eurovision Song Contest 2022

On 17 June 2022 she released her third album Vergogna, preceded by the singles "123 medicine" and "Ambigua".

On 21 March 2025 she released her fourth album, Brianzola Issues, preceded by the singles "Mi ami veramente?", "Kids Never Sleep", "Allucinazione", "Vinted" and "Vuoi soltanto una hit".

In October 2025 she was selected to participate in Sanremo Giovani 2025, the youth competition for the Sanremo Music Festival 2026, with the song "Radio Erotika". After making it through the first round, she reached the semifinal where she was eliminated.

== Discography ==
=== Studio albums ===
List of albums with details
Title	Album details
Disco	Released: 28 February 2020; Label: La Clinica Dischi, Artist First; Format: CD, digital download, streaming
Disco 2	Released: 4 June 2021; Label: Sony Music; Format: CD, digital download, streaming
Vergogna	Released: 17 June 2022; Label: Columbia, Sony Music; Format: CD, digital download, streaming
Brianzola Issues	Released: 21 March 2025; Label: Columbia, Sony Music; Format: CD, digital download, streaming

=== Singles ===
==== As lead artist ====
List of singles, with chart positions and album name
Title	Year	Peak chart positions	Album
Title	Year	ITA	Album
"Lasciami andare!"	2019	—	Disco
"Carne per cani"	2019	—	Disco
"Lago blu"	2019	—	Disco
"L'esatto momento"	2020	—	Disco
"Dio, come ti amo"	2020	—	Non-album singles
"Serpente"	2020	89	Non-album singles
"Sparami"	2020	35	Non-album singles
"Se mi pieghi non mi spezzi"	2021	—	Disco 2
"Pensieri sbagliati"	2022	—	Disco 2
"123 medicine"	2022	—	Vergogna
"Ambigua"	2022	—	Vergogna
"Mi ami davvero?"	2023	—	Brianzola Issues
"Kids Never Sleep"	2024	—	Brianzola Issues
"Allucinazione"	2024	—	Brianzola Issues
"Vinted"	2025	—	Brianzola Issues
"Vuoi soltanto una hit"	2025	—	Brianzola Issues
"Radio Erotika"	2025	—	Non-album singles
"Sei solo tu"	2026	—	Non-album singles
"—" denotes singles that did not chart or were not released.

==== As featured artist ====
List of singles as featured artist
Title	Year	Album
"Crepe" (Apice featuring Cmqmartina)	2019	Beltempo
"Come ti pare" (Svegliaginevra featuring Cmqmartina)	2022	Pensieri sparsi sulla tangenziale
"Tintarella di luna" (DJ Matrix featuring Cmqmartina and Harry Gose)	2022	Non-album singles
"Sergente" (Eva Bloo featuring Cmqmartina)	2025	Non-album singles

=== Collaborations ===
List of singles as featured artist
Title	Year	Album or EP
"L'amore è una droga" (Lo Stato Sociale featuring Cmqmartina)	2021	Lodo
"Tagadà" (Vipra featuring Cmqmartina and Populous)	2021	Simpatico, solare, in cerca di amicizie
"Senticomespinge" (Ceri featuring Cmqmartina)	2022	Waxtape: IV movimento
"Top Model" (Francesco De Leo featuring Cmqmartina)	2022	Swarovski
"Prosciutto prosciutto" (Myss Keta featuring Cmqmartina)	2022	Club Topperia
"Giuda" (Marquis featuring Cmqmartina)	2022	Il pasto nudo
"Techno Natale" (DJ Matrix featuring Cmqmartina)	2024	Musica da Après-Ski

== Tours ==
- 2022 – Cool tour
- 2025 – Cmq tour

== Television programs ==
Year	Title	Network			Notes
2020	X Factor	Sky Uno	Now	TV8	Contestant (season 14)

== Participation in singing events ==
- Sanremo Giovani (Rai 2)
  - 2025 – Not a finalist with "Radio Erotika"

== Awards and nominations ==
Year	Award	Nomination	Result	Notes
2021	MEI Award	MEI Youth Award	Won	
