= EarOne =

Internet platform for Italian airplay monitoring, and chart publishing

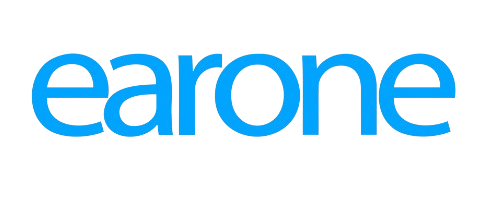
- Industry: Music industry & Media
- Founded: 2008; 18 years ago
- Founder: Maurizio Gugliotta
- Headquarters: Messina, Italy
- Owner: Xdevel S.r.l.
- Website: earone.com

EarOne is an Italian radio and television airplay chart publisher launched in 2008 by the broadcasting software company Xdevel S.r.l. It tracks the most-played songs on Italian radio and TV, publishing both overall and genre-specific charts. Its rankings are compiled from data provided by Italian broadcasters and more than 200 radio stations across the country. In March 2024, EarOne launched its website, earone.com, which provides access to the latest and historical radio and TV airplay charts, radio awards and artist milestones, new music dates, personalised music discovery, and live radio.

== Functionality and resources ==
EarOne is a partner of the music and radio industry in Italy and provides monitoring and classification services for songs broadcast on radio and TV. It offers data and analytical tools, real-time rankings through its Mediasender system, and reporting from over 400 broadcasters. EarOne emphasises the importance of providing analytical data that can be interpreted over time to assess the performance of a particular song on radio, rather than focusing on individual snapshots of a song's chart position. With this approach, they aim to foster the understanding that airplay is not just a ranking, but a tool for understanding the music market and the editorial habits of broadcasters. EarOne's founder Maurizio Gugliotta has likened the radio monitoring system to "a big ear covering the entire country, listening to what all the radio stations are playing" and subsequently providing data that helps artists' record labels understand whether a song works on the radio.

=== EarOne Website ===
In March 2024, EarOne launched their website earone.com, which offers radio and television airplay charts, compiled into top 50 rankings of the most popular songs. This includes the main EarOne Airplay chart, the EarOne International Airplay chart, the EarOne Independent Airplay chart, and genre-specific charts including for dance, urban, rock, and Latin music songs. They also provide domestic television airplay charts, which rank songs played on music television channels. The website has been extensively referenced by publications as a source of airplay information in Italy. (Note: Attributed to mention of EarOne airplay charts in multiple sources:)
