= Italy in the Eurovision Song Contest 2022 =

- Eurovision Song Contest 2022
- Participating broadcaster: Radiotelevisione italiana (RAI)
- Country: Italy
- Selection process: Sanremo Music Festival 2022
- Selection date: 5 February 2022

Competing entry
- Song: "Brividi"
- Artist: Mahmood and Blanco
- Songwriters: Alessandro Mahmoud; Michele "Michelangelo" Zocca; Riccardo Fabbriconi

Placement
- Final result: 6th, 268 points

Participation chronology

Italy was represented at the Eurovision Song Contest 2022 with the song "Brividi", written by Alessandro Mahmoud, Michele Zocca, and Riccardo Fabbriconi, and performed by Mahmoud and Fabbriconi themselves under their respective stage names, Mahmood and Blanco. The Italian participating broadcaster, Radiotelevisione italiana (RAI), selected its entry through the Sanremo Music Festival 2022. In addition, RAI was also the host broadcaster and staged the event at the PalaOlimpico in Turin, after winning the previous edition with "Zitti e buoni" by Måneskin.

== Background ==
Prior to the 2022 contest, Radiotelevisione italiana (RAI) had participated in the Eurovision Song Contest representing Italy forty-six times since its first entry at the inaugural contest in 1956. Since then, it has won the contest on three occasions: in 1964 with the song "Non ho l'età" performed by Gigliola Cinquetti, in 1990 with "Insieme: 1992" by Toto Cutugno, and in 2021 with "Zitti e buoni" by Måneskin. RAI has withdrawn from the contest a number of times, with their most recent absence spanning from 1998 until 2010. It made its return in 2011, and its entry "Madness of Love", performed by Raphael Gualazzi, placed second—their highest result, to that point, since its victory in 1990. A number of top 10 placements followed in the next editions, culminating with its victory in 2021.

Between 2011 and 2013 and since 2015, RAI has regularly used the Sanremo Music Festival to select its entry to the contest, at first through an intermediate stage of internal selection among the contestants, and after 2014 (when a full internal selection took place), the winner of the festival has always earned the right of first refusal to represent Italy in the Eurovision Song Contest.

== Before Eurovision ==
=== Sanremo Music Festival 2022 ===
Italian broadcaster RAI confirmed that the performer that would represent Italy at the Eurovision Song Contest 2022 would be selected from the competing artists at the Sanremo Music Festival 2022, the 72nd edition of the event. According to the rules of Sanremo 2022, the winner of the festival earns the right to represent Italy at the Eurovision Song Contest, but in case the artist is not available or refuses the offer, the organisers of the event reserve the right to choose another participant via their own criteria. The competition took place between 1 and 5 February 2022 with the winner being selected on the last day of the festival.

For the third year in a row, Amadeus served as the artistic director and presenter of Sanremo, and was joined on stage by Ornella Muti, Lorena Cesarini, Drusilla Foer, Maria Chiara Giannetta and Sabrina Ferilli, each on a different night. 25 artists, three of which directly qualifying from the newcomers' section Sanremo Giovani (held on 15 December 2021), competed in the festival. This took place over the course of five consecutive nights, articulated as follows:

- On each of the first two nights, half of the entrants performed their songs, and were judged by three separate panels from a jury of journalists.
- On the third night, all of the songs were performed and voted through a 50/50 split system by means of televoting and a demoscopic jury. The results were combined with those of the previous nights.
- On the fourth night, the contestants each performed a cover of a song, and were voted by the same system used on the first three nights.
- On the last night, the 25 entries were once again performed, going through televoting alone, to be added up to the results obtained that far; ultimately, a final voting round (again a sum of televoting and the two juries) was held among the top 3, which determined the winner.

The first 22 competing artists were announced on 4 December 2021. Six former Eurovision Song Contest entrants were among the competing artists: Iva Zanicchi (1969), Gianni Morandi (1970), Massimo Ranieri (1971 and 1973), Emma (2014), Fabrizio Moro (2018) and Mahmood (2019). On 15 December, the three artists qualifying from the Sanremo Giovani section were announced, alongside the titles of all 25 competing songs. Entrant Achille Lauro would later be selected in the Sammarinese national final on 19 February 2022.

Artist	Song	Songwriter(s)
Achille Lauro feat. Harlem Gospel Choir	"Domenica"	Lauro De Marinis, Simon Pietro Manzari, Davide Petrella, Matteo Ciceroni, Mattia Cutolo, Gregorio Calculli
Aka 7even	"Perfetta così"	Luca Marzano, Vincenzo Colella, Max Elias Kleinschmidt, Gianvito Vizzi, Renato Luis Patriarca
Ana Mena	"Duecentomila ore"	Rocco Hunt, Stefano Tognini, Federica Abbate
Dargen D'Amico	"Dove si balla"	Jacopo D'Amico, Edwyn Roberts, Gianluigi Fazio, Andrea Bonomo
Ditonellapiaga and Rettore	"Chimica"	Margherita Carducci, Donatella Rettore, Alessandro Casagni, Benjamin Ventura, Edoardo Castroni, Valerio Smordoni
Elisa	"O forse sei tu"	Elisa Toffoli, Davide Petrella
Emma	"Ogni volta è così"	Emma Marrone, Davide Petrella, Dario Faini
Fabrizio Moro	"Sei tu"	Fabrizio Mobrici, Roberto Cardelli
Gianni Morandi	"Apri tutte le porte"	Lorenzo Cherubini, Riccardo Onori
Giovanni Truppi	"Tuo padre, mia madre, Lucia"	Giovanni Truppi, Luigi De Crescenzo, Niccolò Contessa, Marco Buccelli, Giovanni Pallotti
Giusy Ferreri	"Miele"	Federica Abbate, Davide Petrella, Fabio Clemente, Alessandro Merli
Highsnob and Hu	"Abbi cura di te"	Michele Matera, Federica Ferracuti, Andrea Moroni, Fazio De Marco
Irama	"Ovunque sarai"	Filippo Maria Fanti, Giulio Nenna, Pablo Miguel Lombroni Capalbo, Vincenzo Luca Faraone
Iva Zanicchi	"Voglio amarti"	Italo Ianne, Vito Mercurio, Celso Valli, Emilio Di Stefano
La Rappresentante di Lista	"Ciao ciao"	Veronica Lucchesi, Dario Mangiaracina, Roberto Calabrese, Roberto Cammarata, Carmelo Drago, Simone Privitera
Le Vibrazioni	"Tantissimo"	Francesco Sarcina, Nicco Verrienti, Roberto Casalino
Mahmood and Blanco	"Brividi"	Alessandro Mahmoud, Riccardo Fabbriconi, Michele Zocca
Massimo Ranieri	"Lettera di là dal mare"	Fabio Ilacqua
Matteo Romano	"Virale"	Matteo Romano, Dario Faini, Alessandro La Cava, Federico Rossi
Michele Bravi	"Inverno dei fiori"	Michele Bravi, Alfredo Rapetti, Alex Andrea Vella, Francesco Catitti, Federica Abbate
Noemi	"Ti amo, non lo so dire"	Dario Faini, Alessandro Mahmoud, Alessandro La Cava
Rkomi	"Insuperabile"	Mirko Martorana, Francesco Catitti, Alessandro La Cava
Sangiovanni	"Farfalle"	Giovanni Pietro Damian, Alessandro La Cava, Stefano Tognini
Tananai	"Sesso occasionale"	Alberto Cotta Ramusino, Davide Simonetta, Paolo Antonacci, Alessandro Raina
Yuman	"Ora e qui"	Yuri Santos Tavares Carloia, Francesco Cataldo, Tommaso Di Giulio

==== Final ====
The 25 Big Artists each performed their entry again for a final time on 5 February 2022. A combination of public televoting, press jury voting and demoscopic jury voting selected the top three to face a superfinal vote, then the winner of Sanremo 2022 was decided by a combination of public televoting (34%), demoscopic jury voting (33%) and press jury voting (33%). Mahmood and Blanco were declared the winners of the contest with the song "Brividi".

Final – 5 February 2022
R/O	Artist	Song	Place
1	Matteo Romano	"Virale"	11
2	Giusy Ferreri	"Miele"	23
3	Rkomi	"Insuperabile"	17
4	Iva Zanicchi	"Voglio amarti"	18
5	Aka 7even	"Perfetta così"	13
6	Massimo Ranieri	"Lettera di là dal mare"	8
7	Noemi	"Ti amo, non lo so dire"	15
8	Fabrizio Moro	"Sei tu"	12
9	Dargen D'Amico	"Dove si balla"	9
10	Elisa	"O forse sei tu"	3
11	Irama	"Ovunque sarai"	4
12	Michele Bravi	"Inverno dei fiori"	10
13	La Rappresentante di Lista	"Ciao ciao"	7
14	Emma	"Ogni volta è così"	6
15	Mahmood and Blanco	"Brividi"	1
16	Highsnob and Hu	"Abbi cura di te"	20
17	Sangiovanni	"Farfalle"	5
18	Gianni Morandi	"Apri tutte le porte"	2
19	Ditonellapiaga and Rettore	"Chimica"	16
20	Yuman	"Ora e qui"	21
21	Achille Lauro feat. Harlem Gospel Choir	"Domenica"	14
22	Ana Mena	"Duecentomila ore"	24
23	Tananai	"Sesso occasionale"	25
24	Giovanni Truppi	"Tuo padre, mia madre, Lucia"	19
25	Le Vibrazioni	"Tantissimo"	22

Superfinal – 5 February 2022
R/O	Artist	Song	Demoscopic jury (33%)	Press jury (33%)	Televote (34%)	Total	Place
1	Elisa	"O forse sei tu"	2nd	2nd	21.95%	26.33%	2
2	Gianni Morandi	"Apri tutte le porte"	3rd	3rd	23.79%	21.9%	3
3	Mahmood and Blanco	"Brividi"	1st	1st	54.26%	51.77%	1

== At Eurovision ==
The Eurovision Song Contest 2022 took place at the PalaOlimpico in Turin, Italy and consisted of two semi-finals on 10 and 12 May and the final on 14 May 2022. According to Eurovision rules, all nations with the exceptions of the host country and the "Big Five" (France, Germany, Italy, Spain and the United Kingdom) are required to qualify from one of two semi-finals in order to compete for the final; the top ten countries from each semi-final progress to the final. As both the host country and a member of the "Big Five", Italy automatically qualified to compete in the final. In addition to its participation in the final, Italy was also required to broadcast and vote in one of the two semi-finals. This was decided via a draw held during the semi-final allocation draw on 25 January 2022, when it was announced that Italy would be voting in the first semi-final.

Italy performed in position 9, following the entry from Armenia and before the entry from Spain. At the close of the voting, Italy finished in sixth place overall with 268 points.

=== Voting ===
==== Points awarded to Italy ====
Points awarded to Italy (Final)
Score	Televote	Jury
12 points		Albania; Slovenia
10 points	Malta	Armenia; Azerbaijan; Estonia; Georgia; Montenegro; Spain
8 points	Albania; Switzerland	Belgium; Israel
7 points	Greece	Malta; North Macedonia
6 points	Croatia; Montenegro; North Macedonia; Slovenia	Iceland; Ireland
5 points	Azerbaijan; Cyprus; San Marino; Spain	
4 points	Belgium; Romania; Serbia	Croatia; Lithuania; Poland; Romania
3 points	Austria; France; Germany; Israel; Lithuania; Portugal	Australia; Austria; San Marino
2 points	Bulgaria	Finland; Switzerland
1 point	Australia	Bulgaria; Cyprus; Greece

==== Points awarded by Italy ====
Points awarded by Italy (Semi-final 1)
Score	Televote	Jury
12 points	Ukraine	Greece
10 points	Moldova	Netherlands
8 points	Albania	Armenia
7 points	Armenia	Ukraine
6 points	Portugal	Switzerland
5 points	Norway	Moldova
4 points	Netherlands	Croatia
3 points	Greece	Austria
2 points	Austria	Lithuania
1 point	Lithuania	Latvia

Points awarded by Italy (Final)
Score	Televote	Jury
12 points	Ukraine	Netherlands
10 points	Moldova	Greece
8 points	Romania	Armenia
7 points	Serbia	Belgium
6 points	United Kingdom	United Kingdom
5 points	Sweden	Moldova
4 points	Norway	Serbia
3 points	Poland	Switzerland
2 points	Netherlands	Australia
1 point	Portugal	Finland

==== Detailed voting results ====
The following members comprised the Italian jury:

- Andrea Spinelli - Artist
- Cinzia Poli - Radio host, designer
- Filippo Solibello - Radio host
- Monica Agostini - TV journalist
- Paolo Di Gioia - Musician

Detailed voting results from Italy (Semi-final 1)
R/O	Country	Jury							Televote		
R/O	Country	Juror A	Juror B	Juror C	Juror D	Juror E	Rank	Points	Percentage	Rank	Points
01	Albania	11	11	5	17	11	14		9.85%	3	8
02	Latvia	10	17	15	2	17	10	1	3.01%	11	
03	Lithuania	12	15	4	15	5	9	2	3.07%	10	1
04	Switzerland	4	2	16	7	6	5	6	2.64%	13	
05	Slovenia	17	9	17	3	16	12		1.85%	17	
06	Ukraine	7	3	3	8	7	4	7	24.28%	1	12
07	Bulgaria	6	8	10	16	15	15		2.23%	16	
08	Netherlands	2	4	2	5	8	2	10	4.16%	7	4
09	Moldova	9	7	1	6	9	6	5	16.92%	2	10
10	Portugal	3	12	13	11	14	11		5.08%	5	6
11	Croatia	14	16	7	4	4	7	4	2.62%	14	
12	Denmark	16	6	11	12	12	17		2.96%	12	
13	Austria	13	10	9	10	3	8	3	3.39%	9	2
14	Iceland	15	5	14	14	10	16		2.44%	15	
15	Greece	1	1	8	13	1	1	12	3.90%	8	3
16	Norway	5	13	12	9	13	13		4.92%	6	5
17	Armenia	8	14	6	1	2	3	8	6.48%	4	7

Detailed voting results from Italy (Final)
R/O	Country	Jury							Televote		
R/O	Country	Juror A	Juror B	Juror C	Juror D	Juror E	Rank	Points	Percentage	Rank	Points
01	Czech Republic	20	10	11	10	17	15		1.39%	23	
02	Romania	22	24	16	24	22	24		6.64%	3	8
03	Portugal	6	17	12	8	14	12		2.83%	10	1
04	Finland	7	22	4	11	10	10	1	1.90%	15	
05	Switzerland	8	9	15	4	7	8	3	1.64%	20	
06	France	11	21	21	14	23	20		1.43%	22	
07	Norway	21	19	13	9	12	16		3.50%	7	4
08	Armenia	5	23	3	2	2	3	8	2.71%	11	
09	Italy										
10	Spain	19	8	20	13	24	18		2.71%	12	
11	Netherlands	2	11	1	3	4	1	12	3.32%	9	2
12	Ukraine	15	7	8	17	9	11		29.50%	1	12
13	Germany	16	16	10	12	16	17		1.71%	18	
14	Lithuania	12	20	5	16	15	14		2.17%	13	
15	Azerbaijan	18	14	24	20	13	22		1.88%	16	
16	Belgium	17	2	6	1	6	4	7	1.73%	17	
17	Greece	1	3	7	15	1	2	10	1.93%	14	
18	Iceland	13	15	18	21	19	21		0.87%	24	
19	Moldova	14	6	2	5	5	6	5	13.34%	2	10
20	Sweden	4	12	19	18	20	13		3.58%	6	5
21	Australia	24	4	17	22	3	9	2	1.57%	21	
22	United Kingdom	3	1	14	7	11	5	6	3.88%	5	6
23	Poland	10	13	23	19	21	19		3.39%	8	3
24	Serbia	9	5	9	6	8	7	4	4.69%	4	7
25	Estonia	23	18	22	23	18	23		1.68%	19	
