= Sanremo Music Festival 2022 =

Italian song contest (72nd edition)

Dates and venue
- Semi-final 1: 1 February 2022
- Semi-final 2: 2 February 2022
- Semi-final 3: 3 February 2022
- Semi-final 4: 4 February 2022
- Final: 5 February 2022
- Venue: Teatro Ariston; Sanremo, Italy

Production
- Broadcaster: Radiotelevisione italiana (RAI)
- Director: Stefano Vicario
- Musical director: Leonardo De Amicis
- Artistic director: Amadeus
- Presenters: Amadeus and Ornella Muti (first night) Lorena Cesarini (second night) Drusilla Foer (third night) Maria Chiara Giannetta (fourth night) Sabrina Ferilli (fifth night)

Big Artists section
- Number of entries: 25
- Winner: "Brividi"; Mahmood and Blanco

The Sanremo Music Festival 2022 (Italian: Festival di Sanremo 2022), officially the 72nd Italian Song Festival (72º Festival della canzone italiana), was the 72nd edition of the annual Sanremo Music Festival, a television song contest held at the Teatro Ariston in Sanremo, organised and broadcast by Radiotelevisione italiana (RAI). The show was held between 1 and 5 February 2022, and was presented for the third time in a row by Amadeus, who also served as the artistic director for the competition, alongside a number of co-hosts.

The festival was won by Mahmood and Blanco with "Brividi", earning them the right to represent Italy in the Eurovision Song Contest 2022, held on home soil in Turin; Mahmood had previously won Sanremo in 2019 and had represented Italy in that year's Eurovision.

== Format ==
The 2022 edition of the Sanremo Music Festival took place at the Teatro Ariston in Sanremo, Liguria, organized by the Italian public broadcaster RAI. The artistic director and the presenter for the competition was Amadeus, for the third consecutive year.

The venue returned to its full capacity during the festival, after the presence of an audience was not allowed in the previous edition due to the COVID-19 pandemic.

=== Presenters ===
In August 2021, RAI officially confirmed Amadeus as the presenter of the 72nd edition of the Sanremo Music Festival. Together with Amadeus, five co-hosts alternated during the five evenings: Ornella Muti, Lorena Cesarini, Drusilla Foer, Maria Chiara Giannetta and Sabrina Ferilli.

Besides these, Orietta Berti and Fabio Rovazzi hosted parts of the show (for sponsorship reasons) from the cruise ship Costa Toscana off the shore of Sanremo.

=== Voting ===
Voting occurred through the combination of three methods:

- Public televoting, carried out via landline, mobile phone, the contest's official mobile app, and online voting.
- Jury of the press room, TV, radio and web.
- Demoscopic jury, composed by 1000 music fans who vote from their homes via an electronic voting system managed by Ipsos.

Their voting was articulated as follows:

- First two nights: half of the entrants were judged by three separate panels from the jury of the press room, TV, radio and web.
- Third night: all of the entrants were judged through a 50/50 split system by means of televoting and the demoscopic jury. The results were combined with those of the previous nights.
- Fourth night: the same systems used on the first three nights were put in place.
- Fifth night: the entrants were judged by televoting alone, to be added up to the results obtained that far; ultimately, a final voting round (again a sum of televoting and the two juries) was held among the top 3, which determined the winner.

== Selections ==
=== Sanremo Giovani 2021 ===
Unlike previous editions, the Newcomers' section was not included in the Festival, but a similar selection was held to decree the three places reserved in the Big Artist section. The artists competing in the new format were selected through two separate contests: Standard section and Area Sanremo.

==== Standard selection ====
On 20 October 2021, the RAI commission for Sanremo Music Festival 2022 announced a list of 711 acts, but only 30 artists coming from all Italian regions – excluding Basilicata and Valle d'Aosta – and from abroad were selected in the first phase.

On 22 November 2021, the RAI commission announced the eight finalists.

- Bais – "Che fine mi fai"
- Esseho – "Arianna"
- Martina Beltrami – "Parlo di te"
- Matteo Romano – "Testa e croce"
- Oli? – "Smalto e tinta"
- Samia – "Fammi respirare"
- Tananai – "Esagerata"
- Yuman – "Mille notti"

==== Area Sanremo ====
After the auditions, a RAI commission – composed by Amadeus, Gianmarco Mazzi, Claudio Fasulo, Massimo Martelli and Leonardo de Amicis – identified 4 finalists for the competition among the 330 acts:

- Destro – "Agosto di piena estate"
- Littamè – "Cazzo avete da guardare"
- Senza Cri – "A me"
- Vittoria – "California"

==== Final ====
On 15 December 2021, the twelve finalists performed their songs at Sanremo Casino in Sanremo, with the show Sanremo Giovani 2021 broadcast on Rai 1 and presented by Amadeus. The three winners of the night, i.e. Yuman, Tananai and Matteo Romano, participated in Sanremo 2022 with a new entry.

R/O	Artist	Song	Place
1	Samia	"Fammi respirare"	N/A
2	Oli?	"Smalto e tinta"	N/A
3	Tananai	"Esagerata"	2
4	Vittoria	"California"	N/A
5	Matteo Romano	"Testa e croce"	3
6	Littamè	"Cazzo avete da guardare"	N/A
7	Yuman	"Mille notti"	1
8	Esseho	"Arianna"	N/A
9	Martina Beltrami	"Parlo di te"	N/A
10	Destro	"Agosto di piena estate"	N/A
11	Senza Cri	"A me"	N/A
12	Bais	"Che fine mi fai"	N/A

=== Big Artists ===
The traditional Big Artists section of the contest was merged with the Newcomers' section, and saw the participation of 25 artists, 22 being selected among established artists as before and 3 qualifying from Sanremo Giovani. The former 22, selected from 343 submissions received, were revealed on 4 December 2021, and also attended the night of Sanremo Giovani on 15 December, where their competing songs' titles were also made known.

== Competing entries ==
Competing songs and artists, showing writers, orchestra conductor and results achieved
Song	Artist	Songwriter(s)	Orchestra conductor	Rank	Sanremo Music Festival Awards
"Brividi"	Mahmood and Blanco	Alessandro "Mahmood" Mahmoud; Riccardo "Blanco" Fabbriconi; Michele "Michelangelo" Zocca	Carmelo Patti (nights 1, 3 and 5); Michelangelo (night 4)	1	Winner of the "Big Artists" section – Golden Lion
"O forse sei tu"	Elisa	Elisa Toffoli; Davide Petrella	Will Medini	2	Orchestra's "Giancarlo Bigazzi" Award for the Best Composition
"Apri tutte le porte"	Gianni Morandi	Lorenzo "Jovanotti" Cherubini; Riccardo Onori	Mousse T.	3	Press room's "Lucio Dalla" Award
"Ovunque sarai"	Irama	Filippo Maria Fanti; Giulio Nenna; Pablo Miguel "Shablo" Lombroni Capalbo; Vincenzo Luca Faraone	Giulio Nenna	4	None
"Farfalle"	Sangiovanni	Giovanni Pietro "Sangiovanni" Damian; Alessandro La Cava; Stefano Tognini	Carmelo Patti	5	None
"Ogni volta è così"	Emma	Emma Marrone; Davide Petrella; Dario "Dardust" Faini	Francesca Michielin (nights 2, 3 and 5); Carmelo Patti (night 4)	6	None
"Ciao ciao"	La Rappresentante di Lista	Veronica Lucchesi; Dario Mangiaracina; Roberto Calabrese; Roberto Cammarata; Carmelo Drago; Simone Privitera	Carmelo Patti	7	None
"Lettera di là dal mare"	Massimo Ranieri	Fabio Ilacqua	Adriano Pennino	8	"Mia Martini" Critic's Award
"Dove si balla"	Dargen D'Amico	Jacopo "Dargen" D'Amico; Edwyn Roberts; Gianluigi Fazio; Andrea Bonomo	Enzo Campagnoli	9	None
"Inverno dei fiori"	Michele Bravi	Michele Bravi; Alfredo "Cheope" Rapetti; Alex Andrea "Raige" Vella; Francesco "Katoo" Catitti; Federica Abbate)	Enzo Campagnoli	10	None
"Virale"	Matteo Romano	Matteo Romano; Dario "Dardust" Faini; Alessandro La Cava; Federico Rossi	Valeriano Chiaravalle	11	None
"Sei tu"	Fabrizio Moro	Fabrizio Mobrici; Roberto Cardelli	Claudio Junior Bielli	12	Music commission's "Sergio Bardotti" Award for the Best Lyrics
"Perfetta così"	Aka 7even	Luca "Aka 7even" Marzano; Vincenzo Colella; Max Elias Kleinschmidt; Gianvito Vizzi; Renato Luis Patriarca	Carmelo Patti	13	None
"Domenica"	Achille Lauro feat. Harlem Gospel Choir	Lauro De Marinis; Simon Pietro Manzari; Davide Petrella; Matteo "Göw Trïbe" Ciceroni; Mattia Cutolo; Gregorio Calculli	Gregorio Calculli	14	None
"Ti amo non lo so dire"	Noemi	Dario "Dardust" Faini; Alessandro "Mahmood" Mahmoud; Alessandro La Cava	Andrea Rodini	15	None
"Chimica"	Ditonellapiaga and Donatella Rettore	Margherita "Ditonellapiaga" Carducci; Donatella Rettore; Alessandro Casagni; Benjamin Ventura; Edoardo Castroni; Valerio Smordoni	Fabio Gurian	16	None
"Insuperabile"	Rkomi	Mirko "Rkomi" Martorana; Francesco "Katoo" Catitti; Alessandro La Cava	Luca Faraone	17	None
"Voglio amarti"	Iva Zanicchi	Italo Ianne; Vito Mercurio; Celso Valli; Emilio Di Stefano	Danilo Minotti	18	None
"Tuo padre, mia madre, Lucia"	Giovanni Truppi	Giovanni Truppi; Pacifico; Niccolò Contessa; Marco Buccelli; Giovanni Pallotti	Stefano Nanni	19	Lunezia Award
"Abbi cura di te"	Highsnob and Hu	Michele "Highsnob" Matera; Federica "Hu" Ferracuti; Andrea Moroni; Fazio De Marco	Enrico Melozzi	20	None
"Ora e qui"	Yuman	Yuri "Yuman" Santos Tavares Carloia; Francesco Cataldo; Tommaso Di Giulio	Valeriano Chiaravalle	21	NuovoIMAIE "Enzo Jannacci" Award for the Best Interpretation
"Tantissimo"	Le Vibrazioni	Francesco Sarcina; Nicco Verrienti; Roberto Casalino	Simone Bertolotti (nights 2 and 3); Marco Attura (night 4); Peppe Vessicchio (night 5) (Note: Peppe Vessicchio was originally scheduled to conduct the band's performances before being found with COVID-19 and not being able to attend rehearsals. During the live shows, he was replaced by Simone Bertolotti on the first two occasions despite testing negative in time. He was present on the fourth night as one of the band's accompanying artists and on the fifth night as the orchestra conductor.)	22	None
"Miele"	Giusy Ferreri	Federica Abbate; Davide Petrella; Fabio Clemente; Alessandro Merli	Enrico Melozzi	23	None
"Duecentomila ore"	Ana Mena	Rocco "Hunt" Pagliarulo; Stefano "Zef" Tognini; Federica Abbate	Enrico Melozzi	24	None
"Sesso occasionale"	Tananai	Alberto "Tananai" Cotta Ramusino; Davide Simonetta; Paolo Antonacci; Alessandro Raina	Fabio Gurian	25	None

== Shows ==
=== First night ===
The first twelve artists each performed their song.

First night: 1 February 2022
R/O	Artist	Song	Press jury ranking			
R/O	Artist	Song	Panel 1 (press and TV)	Panel 2 (radio)	Panel 3 (web)	Total ranking
1	Achille Lauro feat. Harlem Gospel Choir	"Domenica"	9	5	9	9
2	Yuman	"Ora e qui"	10	11	11	11
3	Noemi	"Ti amo non lo so dire"	8	4	7	6
4	Gianni Morandi	"Apri tutte le porte"	5	2	5	4
5	La Rappresentante di Lista	"Ciao ciao"	1	2	2	2
6	Michele Bravi	"Inverno dei fiori"	6	10	6	7
7	Massimo Ranieri	"Lettera di là dal mare"	4	8	3	5
8	Mahmood and Blanco	"Brividi"	2	1	1	1
9	Ana Mena	"Duecentomila ore"	12	12	12	12
10	Rkomi	"Insuperabile"	7	9	8	8
11	Dargen D'Amico	"Dove si balla"	3	6	3	3
12	Giusy Ferreri	"Miele"	11	7	10	10

=== Second night ===
The remaining thirteen artists each performed their song.

Second night: 2 February 2022
R/O	Artist	Song	Press jury ranking			
R/O	Artist	Song	Panel 1 (press and TV)	Panel 2 (radio)	Panel 3 (web)	Total ranking
1	Sangiovanni	"Farfalle"	7	4	5	7
2	Giovanni Truppi	"Tuo padre, mia madre, Lucia"	4	11	7	6
3	Le Vibrazioni	"Tantissimo"	12	9	11	12
4	Emma	"Ogni volta è così"	3	2	3	2
5	Matteo Romano	"Virale"	9	6	10	8
6	Iva Zanicchi	"Voglio amarti"	10	12	9	10
7	Ditonellapiaga and Donatella Rettore	"Chimica"	2	6	2	3
8	Elisa	"O forse sei tu"	1	1	1	1
9	Fabrizio Moro	"Sei tu"	5	5	5	5
10	Tananai	"Sesso occasionale"	13	13	13	13
11	Irama	"Ovunque sarai"	6	3	4	4
12	Aka 7even	"Perfetta così"	11	9	12	11
13	Highsnob and Hu	"Abbi cura di te"	8	8	8	9

=== Third night ===
All of the twenty-five artists performed their songs once again.

Third night: 3 February 2022
R/O	Artist	Song	Provisional general ranking	Night rankings			Updated general ranking
R/O	Artist	Song	Provisional general ranking	Demoscopic jury	Televote	Total ranking	Updated general ranking
1	Giusy Ferreri	"Miele"	19	20	22	23	21
2	Highsnob and Hu	"Abbi cura di te"	18	21	19	19	20
3	Fabrizio Moro	"Sei tu"	10	8	6	7	8
4	Aka 7even	"Perfetta così"	21	16	10	10	13
5	Massimo Ranieri	"Lettera di là dal mare"	8	7	8	8	7
6	Dargen D'Amico	"Dove si balla"	4	9	11	11	10
7	Irama	"Ovunque sarai"	9	5	3	4	4
8	Ditonellapiaga and Donatella Rettore	"Chimica"	7	14	15	13	12
9	Michele Bravi	"Inverno dei fiori"	14	12	8	9	11
10	Rkomi	"Insuperabile"	15	22	13	15	16
11	Mahmood and Blanco	"Brividi"	2	2	1	1	1
12	Gianni Morandi	"Apri tutte le porte"	5	3	2	2	3
13	Tananai	"Sesso occasionale"	24	25	25	25	25
14	Elisa	"O forse sei tu"	1	1	4	3	2
15	La Rappresentante di Lista	"Ciao ciao"	3	7	12	12	9
16	Iva Zanicchi	"Voglio amarti"	20	18	17	18	18
17	Achille Lauro feat. Harlem Gospel Choir	"Domenica"	16	17	14	14	14
18	Matteo Romano	"Virale"	17	13	16	16	17
19	Ana Mena	"Duecentomila ore"	25	24	18	21	24
20	Sangiovanni	"Farfalle"	13	10	5	5	5
21	Emma	"Ogni volta è così"	6	4	9	6	6
22	Yuman	"Ora e qui"	23	23	19	22	23
23	Le Vibrazioni	"Tantissimo"	22	15	24	20	22
24	Giovanni Truppi	"Tuo padre, mia madre, Lucia"	11	23	21	24	19
25	Noemi	"Ti amo non lo so dire"	12	6	20	17	15

=== Fourth night ===
The artists each performed a cover of a song from the '60s, '70s, '80s, or '90s. They could either perform alone or duet with a guest performer.

Fourth night: 4 February 2022
R/O	Artist	Guest artist	Song	Night rankings				Updated general ranking
R/O	Artist	Guest artist	Song	Press jury	Demoscopic jury	Televote	Total ranking	Updated general ranking
1	Noemi	None	"(You Make Me Feel Like) A Natural Woman"	7	6	15	11	15
2	Giovanni Truppi	Vinicio Capossela and Mauro Pagani	"Nella mia ora di libertà"	11	23	11	15	18
3	Yuman	Rita Marcotulli	"My Way"	21	20	18	20	21
4	Le Vibrazioni	Sophie and the Giants and Peppe Vessicchio	"Live and Let Die"	14	15	22	18	20
5	Sangiovanni	Fiorella Mannoia	"A muso duro"	13	11	4	4	5
6	Emma	Francesca Michielin	"...Baby One More Time"	7	5	5	5	6
7	Gianni Morandi	Jovanotti	Gianni Morandi and Jovanotti medley (Note: "Occhi di ragazza", "Un mondo d'amore", "Ragazzo fortunato" and "Penso positivo")	2	2	1	1	2
8	Elisa	Elena D'Amario	"Flashdance... What a Feeling"	1	1	3	3	3
9	Achille Lauro	Loredana Bertè	"Sei bellissima"	5	8	7	6	11
10	Matteo Romano	Malika Ayane	"Your Song"	7	4	8	7	12
11	Irama	Gianluca Grignani	"La mia storia tra le dita"	18	12	6	8	4
12	Ditonellapiaga and Donatella Rettore	None	"Nessuno mi può giudicare"	19	16	21	19	16
13	Iva Zanicchi	None	"Canzone"	12	14	16	16	17
14	Ana Mena	Rocco Hunt	Medley (Note: "Il mondo", "Figli delle stelle" and "Se mi lasci non vale")	24	19	17	21	24
15	La Rappresentante di Lista	Cosmo, Margherita Vicario and Ginevra	"Be My Baby"	3	10	12	9	7
16	Massimo Ranieri	Nek	"Anna verrà"	6	13	13	12	8
17	Michele Bravi	None	"Io vorrei... non vorrei... ma se vuoi"	17	21	9	14	10
18	Mahmood and Blanco	None	"Il cielo in una stanza"	4	3	2	2	1
19	Rkomi	Calibro 35	Vasco '80s medley (Note: "Fegato, fegato spappolato", "Deviazioni" and "Cosa succede in città")	23	25	20	24	19
20	Aka 7even	Arisa	"Cambiare"	10	7	10	10	14
21	Highsnob and Hu	Mr. Rain	"Mi sono innamorato di te"	20	22	23	22	22
22	Dargen D'Amico	None	"La bambola"	14	18	19	17	13
23	Giusy Ferreri	Andrea Fumagalli	"Io vivrò senza te"	22	17	24	23	23
24	Fabrizio Moro	None	"Uomini soli"	16	9	14	13	9
25	Tananai	Rosa Chemical	"A far l'amore comincia tu"	25	24	25	25	25

=== Fifth night ===
All of the artists performed their songs one last time, with the top three moving on to the final round of voting.

Advanced to superfinal

Fifth night: 5 February 2022 – first round
R/O	Artist	Song	Televote ranking	Final general ranking
1	Matteo Romano	"Virale"	10	11
2	Giusy Ferreri	"Miele"	24	23
3	Rkomi	"Insuperabile"	15	17
4	Iva Zanicchi	"Voglio amarti"	18	18
5	Aka 7even	"Perfetta così"	13	13
6	Massimo Ranieri	"Lettera di là dal mare"	9	8
7	Noemi	"Ti amo non lo so dire"	16	15
8	Fabrizio Moro	"Sei tu"	12	12
9	Dargen D'Amico	"Dove si balla"	7	9
10	Elisa	"O forse sei tu"	4	3
11	Irama	"Ovunque sarai"	3	4
12	Michele Bravi	"Inverno dei fiori"	11	10
13	La Rappresentante di Lista	"Ciao ciao"	6	7
14	Emma	"Ogni volta è così"	8	6
15	Mahmood and Blanco	"Brividi"	1	1
16	Highsnob and Hu	"Abbi cura di te"	21	20
17	Sangiovanni	"Farfalle"	5	5
18	Gianni Morandi	"Apri tutte le porte"	2	2
19	Ditonellapiaga and Donatella Rettore	"Chimica"	17	16
20	Yuman	"Ora e qui"	22	21
21	Achille Lauro feat. Harlem Gospel Choir	"Domenica"	14	14
22	Ana Mena	"Duecentomila ore"	19	24
23	Tananai	"Sesso occasionale"	23	25
24	Giovanni Truppi	"Tuo padre, mia madre, Lucia"	20	19
25	Le Vibrazioni	"Tantissimo"	25	22

Fifth night: 5 February 2022 – second round (superfinal)
R/O	Artist	Song	Rankings				Place
R/O	Artist	Song	Press jury	Demoscopic jury	Televote	Total	Place
1	Elisa	"O forse sei tu"	2	2	3 (21.95%)	2 (26.33%)	2
2	Gianni Morandi	"Apri tutte le porte"	3	3	2 (23.79%)	3 (21.9%)	3
3	Mahmood and Blanco	"Brividi"	1	1	1 (54.26%)	1 (51.77%)	1

== Controversies ==
On 31 January 2022, director of Rai 1 Stefano Coletta publicly announced through a press conference that there would be no vaccine mandate for the Sanremo Music Festival 2022 singers as it would have breached the singers' right to privacy on their health status. This was highly criticized by the Italian public, resulting into a second declaration by Coletta, claiming that there was a "misunderstanding" and that the singers would also be required to show their proof of vaccination upon entrance at the festival.

== Special guests ==
The special guests of Sanremo Music Festival 2022 included:

- Singers / musicians: Arisa, Banda musicale della Guardia di Finanza, Cesare Cremonini, Colapesce & Dimartino, Ermal Meta, Gaia, Jovanotti, Laura Pausini, Malika Ayane, Måneskin, Marco Mengoni, Massimo Alberti, Meduza & Hozier, Mika, Orietta Berti, Pinguini Tattici Nucleari
- Actors / comedians / directors / models: Anna Valle, Checco Zalone, Claudio Gioè, Filippo Scotti, Gaia Girace, Lino Guanciale, Margherita Mazzucco, Maurizio Lastrico, Nino Frassica, Raoul Bova, Rosario Fiorello
- Sports people: Elisa Balsamo, Matteo Berrettini, National rhythmic gymnastics team (Agnese Duranti, Alessia Maurelli, Daniela Mogurean, Martina Centofanti, Martina Santandrea)
- Other persons or notable figures: Alessandro Cattelan, cast of Ballo, ballo, Fabio Rovazzi, Mara Venier, Martina Pigliapoco, Roberto Saviano, Sergio Japino

== Broadcast and ratings ==
=== Local broadcast ===
Rai 1 and Rai Radio 2 brought the official broadcasts of the festival in Italy. The five evenings were also streamed online via the broadcaster's official website RaiPlay, which made it available in all member countries of the European Broadcasting Union, since the festival is broadcast on the Eurovision network.

Broadcasters of the Sanremo Music Festival 2023
Country	Show(s)	Broadcaster(s)	Commentator(s)	Ref(s)
Italy	All shows	Rai 1	No commentary	
Italy	All shows	Rai Radio 2	Ema Stokholma and Gino Castaldo	
Italy	All shows	RaiPlay	No commentary	
Italy	All shows	Rai Italia (outside Italy)	No commentary	
Albania	All shows	RTSH Muzikë	No commentary	
Albania	Final	RTSH 1	Andri Xhahu and Blerina Shehu	
Montenegro	All shows	TVCG 2	No commentary	
Spain	Final	RTVE Play	Giuseppe di Bella and Fernando Macías	
United Kingdom	Final	GlitterBeam	Eugenio Ceriello, Michael Walton-Dalzell and guests	

=== Ratings ===
Live show	Timeslot (UTC+1)	Date	1st time (9:00 pm – 0:00 am)		2nd time (0:00 am – 1:30 am)		Overall audience		Ref(s)
Live show	Timeslot (UTC+1)	Date	Viewers	Share (%)	Viewers	Share (%)	Viewers	Share (%)	Ref(s)
1st	9:00 pm	1 February	13,805,000	54.5	6,412,000	55.4	10,911,000	54.7	
2nd	9:00 pm	2 February	13,572,000	55.3	7,307,000	57.4	11,320,000	55.8	
3rd	9:00 pm	3 February	12,849,000	53.2	5,455,000	56.8	9,360,000	54.1	
4th	9:00 pm	4 February	14,731,000	59.2	7,543,000	63.5	11,378,000	60.5	
5th	9:00 pm	5 February	15,660,000	62.1	10,153,000	72.1	13,380,000	64.9	

== See also ==
- Italy in the Eurovision Song Contest 2022
