= Che fastidio! =

2026 single by Ditonellapiaga

Single by Ditonellapiaga

from the album Miss Italia
- Language: Italian
- Released: 25 February 2026
- Genre: Electronic dance music
- Length: 3:14
- Label: BMG; Dischi Belli
- Composers: Margherita Carducci; Edoardo Castroni; Alessandro Casagni; Edoardo Ruzzi
- Lyricists: Margherita Carducci; Edoardo Castroni
- Producers: Alessandro Casagni; Edoardo Ruzzi; Edoardo Castroni

Ditonellapiaga singles chronology
"Sì lo so" (2026)	"Che fastidio!" (2026)	"The Lady Is a Tramp" (2026)

"Che fastidio!" (Italian: [ke ffaˈstiːdjo]; "How annoying!") is a song co-written and recorded by Italian singer Ditonellapiaga, released on 25 February 2026 through BMG and Dischi Belli as the second single from her third studio album, Miss Italia. The song competed in the Sanremo Music Festival 2026, reaching third place and receiving the award for best musical composition.

== Composition ==
The song was written and composed by the singer herself with Edoardo Castroni and Edoardo Ruzzi. In an interview with Rockol, the singer explained the process of recording and writing the song:

"I didn't want any references: we went into the studio without thinking about what we wanted to be inspired by. Initially, we had considered a different track, but then we thought we could take a risk with this one, which is in some ways edgier. We went through a phase of questioning which direction to take, and we decided to go with the one that best defined my identity, or rather to push even further in that direction."

"Che fastidio!" also marked the singer's second participation in the Sanremo Music Festival after competing with "Chimica" alongside Donatella Rettore in 2022. In an interview with Billboard Italia, the singer explained her decision to compete again:

"After my first time on a stage as important as Sanremo, I had to learn to better understand this profession, to read the context around me. That experience affected me a lot: I began to question myself and more and more often I wondered what others might like rather than what I liked. The environment, the people, the pressure made me feel increasingly out of place, as though I had to tone down my identity. Even my stage name had become something of a burden, difficult to manage. I stood by it, but many people expected me to be less 'off-putting'. At a certain point, I felt the need to allow myself not to always be polite. I cannot deny that at a certain point making music stopped being quite so enjoyable for me: it had become stressful, a source of anxiety. I wrote this album at a time when I couldn't take it anymore, and it was an extremely spontaneous way to reclaim my identity and the fun of expressing it."

== Promotion ==
Italian broadcaster RAI organised the 76th edition of the Sanremo Music Festival between 24 and 28 February 2026. On 30 November 2025, Ditonellapiaga was announced as one of the participants of the festival, with the title of her competing entry revealed the following 14 December.

== Charts ==
Chart performance for "Che fastidio!"
Chart (2026)	Peak position
Global Excl. US (Billboard)	183
Italy (FIMI)	2
Italy Airplay (EarOne)	1
Serbia Airplay (Radiomonitor)	20
Switzerland (Schweizer Hitparade)	74

== Certifications ==
Certifications for "Che fastidio!"
Region	Certification	Certified units/sales
Italy (FIMI)	Platinum	200,000^{‡}
^{‡} Sales+streaming figures based on certification alone.
