= Rettore =

Rettore may refer to:

- Magnifico Rettore, head of an Italian university
- Rector (politics)
- Rector (ecclesiastical), a cleric
- Donatella Rettore (born 1955), Italian singer and songwriter
