= LDA (singer) =

Italian singer and rapper (born 2003)

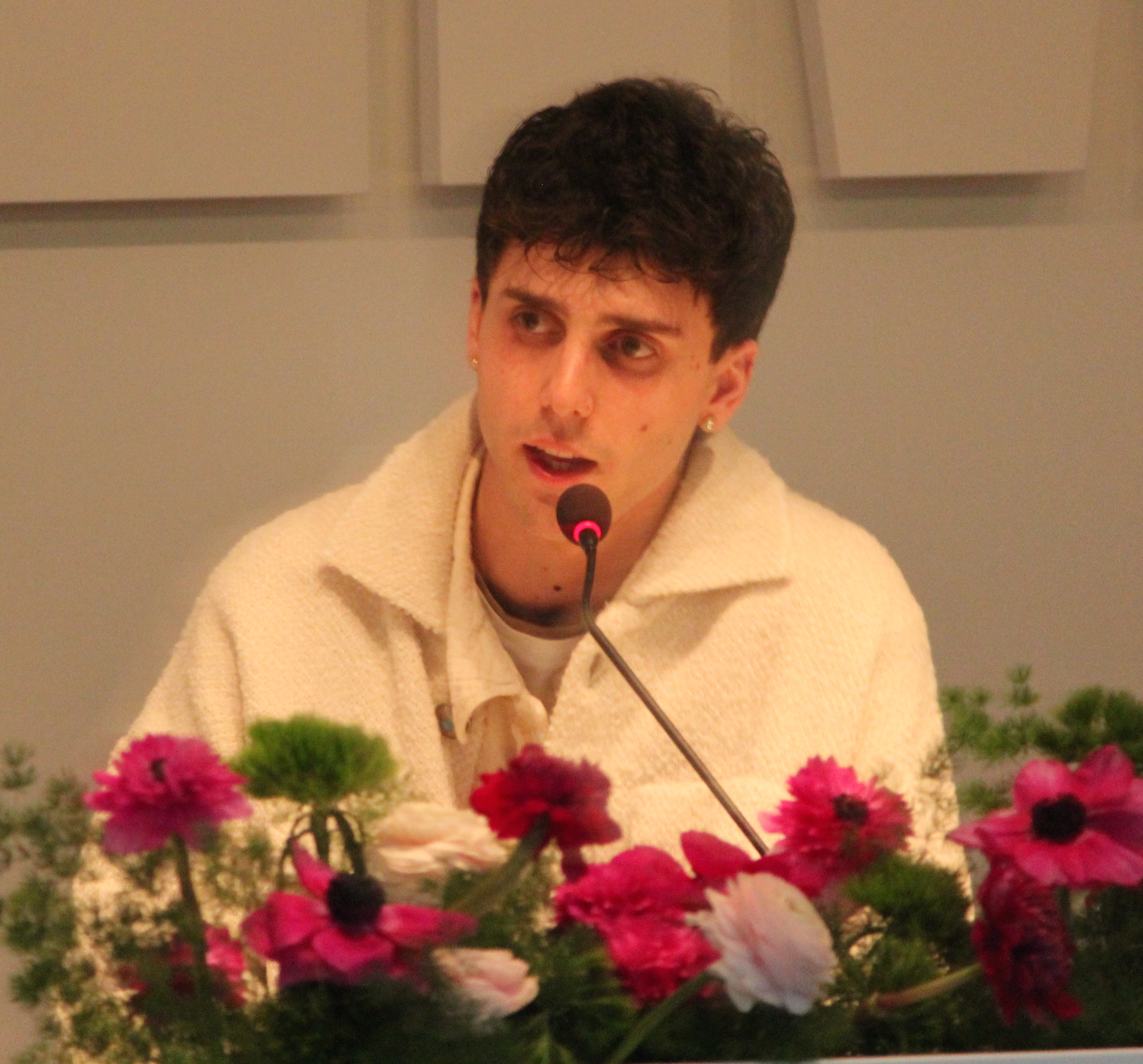
- LDA in February 2026

Background information
- Born: Luca D'Alessio; 27 March 2003 (age 23); Naples, Campania, Italy
- Genres: Pop; latin pop
- Occupations: Singer; songwriter; rapper
- Instruments: Vocals; guitar; piano
- Years active: 2020–present
- Labels: GGD; Columbia; Sony Music

Luca D'Alessio (born 27 March 2003), known professionally as LDA, is an Italian singer-songwriter and rapper.

== Biography ==
D'Alessio was born in Naples, son of Italian singer-songwriter Gigi D'Alessio and his first wife Carmela Barbato. Following in his father's footsteps, he began to cultivate an immediate interest in music, starting to write and compose his own pieces. On March 27, 2020, he released his debut single "Resta", which was followed by the single "Vediamoci stasera" featuring Italian rapper Astol and Spanish singer Robledo.

In March 2021 he released the single "Vivimi" and later took part as a guest on Gigi D'Alessio's album Buongiorno, duetting on the eponymous track and the single "Di notte". In the same year, he took part in the twenty-first season of talent show Amici di Maria De Filippi, reaching the final stage of the show, where he placed fifth in the "Singers" category. During the show's run, the singles "Quello che fa male", "Sai" and "Scusa" were released, respectively; the first was certified platinum and was later followed by a Spanish version.

On April 25, 2022, he released the single "Bandana", which was certified gold and preceded the release of his first self-titled EP, which debuted at number 3 on the Classifica FIMI Artisti. LDA participated in the Sanremo Music Festival 2023 with the song "Se poi domani".

On 30 November 2025, he was announced alongside Aka 7even among the participants of the Sanremo Music Festival 2026. They competed with the song "Poesie clandestine".

== Discography ==
=== Studio albums ===
List of studio albums with details and selected chart positions
Title	Album details	Peak chart positions
Title	Album details	ITA
Quello che fa bene	Released: 17 February 2023; Label: GGD, Columbia; Format: CD, digital download, streaming	16
Poesie clandestine (with Aka 7even)	Released: 6 March 2026; Label: Columbia; Format: CD, LP, digital download, streaming	6

=== Extended plays ===
List of EPs with details and selected chart positions
Title	EP details	Peak chart positions
Title	EP details	ITA
LDA	Released: 13 May 2022; Label: GGD, Sony Music; Format: CD, digital download, streaming	3

=== Singles ===
==== As lead artist ====
List of singles as lead artist, with selected chart positions, showing year released and album name
Title	Year	Peak chart positions	Certifications	Album
Title	Year	ITA	Certifications	Album
"Resta"	2020	—		LDA
"Vediamoci stasera" (featuring Astol and Robledo)	2020	—		Non-album single
"Vivimi"	2021	—		LDA
"Quello che fa male"	2021	14	FIMI: Platinum	LDA
"Sai"	2021	—		LDA
"Scusa"	2021	—		LDA
"Bandana"	2022	55	FIMI: Gold	LDA
"Cado" (with Albe)	2022	—		Quello che fa bene
"Se poi domani"	2023	23	FIMI: Gold	Quello che fa bene
"Granita"	2023	—		Quello che fa bene
"Castello di sabbia"	2023	—		Non-album singles
"Promesse"	2023	—		Non-album singles
"Rosso lampone"	2024	—		Non-album singles
"Shalla"	2025	—		Non-album singles
"Attimo eterno"	2025	—		Non-album singles
"Poesie clandestine" (with Aka 7even)	2026	6	FIMI: Gold	Poesie clandestine
"Andamento lento" (with Aka 7even featuring Tullio De Piscopo)	2026	50		Poesie clandestine
"—" denotes singles that did not chart or were not released.

==== As featured artist ====
List of singles, with chart positions, album name and certifications
Title	Year	Peak chart positions	Certifications	Album
Title	Year	ITA	Certifications	Album
"Buongiorno" (Gigi D'Alessio featuring Vale Lambo, MV Killa, CoCo, LDA, Enzo Dong, Franco Ricciardi, Lele Blade, Clementino, Geolier and Samurai Jay)	2020	44	FIMI: Platinum	Buongiorno
"Nun è cos" (Matteo Paolillo featuring LDA)	2023	—		Edo – Ultimo atto
"—" denotes singles that did not chart or were not released.

== Television ==
Year	Title	Role	Notes
2021–2022	Amici di Maria De Filippi	Himself / Contestant	Talent show (season 21)
2023	Sanremo Music Festival 2023	Himself / Contestant	Annual music festival
2026	Sanremo Music Festival 2026	Himself / Contestant	Annual music festival
