= Giovanni Truppi =

Italian singer-songwriter

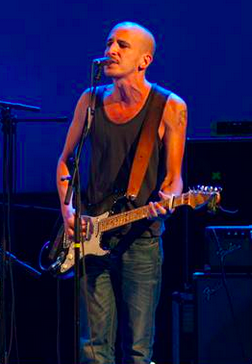
- Giovanni Truppi in Villa Ada, Rome (2015)

Background information
- Born: 21 February 1981 (age 45); Naples, Campania, Italy
- Genres: Indie rock
- Occupation: Singer-songwriter
- Years active: 2010–present
- Labels: Woodworm; Virgin; Universal

Giovanni Truppi (born 21 February 1981) is an Italian singer-songwriter.

== Biography ==
Born in Naples, he debuted in 2010 with the studio album C'è un me dentro di me ("There's one me inside me") by independent label Cinico Disincanto. He also worked both as a songwriter and as an instrumentalist with other musicians, including Motta. In 2017, he contributed to the main song of Francesca Comencini's film Stories of Love That Cannot Belong to This World (Amori che non sanno stare al mondo), which was nominated for the 2018 Silver Ribbon for Best original song. In the same year, he released his first acoustic record, Solopiano.

In 2019, Truppi's fifth album Poesia e civiltà was released for the first time with a major label (Virgin/Universal) and entered the Italian album charts. In the same year, he was awarded with the MEI Prize "Artist of the Year" by independent labels. In 2020, the musician released the extended play 5, which was written in collaboration with other four recording artists – Calcutta, La Rappresentante di Lista, Niccolò Fabi and Brunori Sas – and was accompanied by the comic book Cinque (Coconino Press). In 2021, he published the book L'avventura, in which Truppi describes his experience during the summer 2020 concert tour affected by the COVID-19 pandemic.

He participated at the Sanremo Music Festival 2022 with the song "Tuo padre, mia madre, Lucia".

== Discography ==
=== Studio albums ===
- C'è un me dentro di me (2010)
- Il mondo è come te lo metti in testa (2013)
- Giovanni Truppi (2015)
- Solopiano (2017)
- Poesia e civiltà (2019)
- Infinite possibilità per essere finiti (2023)

=== Extended plays ===
- 5 (2020)
