= Miss Italia (Ditonellapiaga album) =

Studio album by Ditonellapiaga
- Released: 10 April 2026
- Genre: Pop; dance pop; club-pop; EDM
- Length: 33:23
- Label: BMG; Dischi Belli
- Producer: Alessandro Casagni; Edoardo Castroni; Edoardo Ruzzi; Giorgio Pesenti; Simon Says!

Ditonellapiaga chronology
Flash (2024)	Miss Italia (2026)

Singles from Miss Italia
- 1. "Sì lo so" Released: 30 January 2026; 2. "Che fastidio!" Released: 25 February 2026; 3. "Hollywood" Released: 3 April 2026

Miss Italia is the third studio album by Italian singer-songwriter Ditonellapiaga, released on 10 April 2026 through BMG Rights Management and Dischi Belli.

The album includes the single "Che fastidio!", which served as Ditonellapiaga's entry during the Sanremo Music Festival 2026.

== Track listing ==
Miss Italia track listing
No.	Title	Lyrics	Music	Producer(s)	Length
1.	"Sì lo so"	Margherita Carducci	Carducci; Alessandro Casagni	Casagni; Giorgio Pesenti	3:17
2.	"Tropicana Hotline"	Carducci	Carducci; Casagni	Casagni	3:36
3.	"Bibidi bobidi bu"	Carducci	Carducci; Casagni	Casagni	3:09
4.	"Hollywood"	Carducci	Carducci; Casagni	Casagni	3:23
5.	"Che fastidio!"	Carducci; Edoardo Castroni	Carducci; Castroni; Casagni; Edoardo Ruzzi	Casagni; Castroni; Pesenti; Ruzzi	3:14
6.	"Prima o poi"	Carducci	Carducci; Casagni	Casagni	3:20
7.	"Io"	Carducci	Carducci; Casagni	Casagni	3:24
8.	"Le brave ragazze"	Carducci	Carducci; Casagni	Casagni	3:13
9.	"Miss Italia"	Carducci; Federica Abbate	Carducci; Casagni	Casagni; Simon Says!	3:06
10.	"La verità"	Carducci	Carducci; Casagni	Casagni	3:41
Total length:					33:23

== Personnel ==
=== Musicians ===
- Ditonellapiaga – songwriting (all tracks), lead and backing vocals (all tracks)
- Alessandro Casagni – production (all tracks), piano (all tracks), bass (all tracks), programming (all tracks), sound design (all tracks)
- Benjamin Ventura – piano (track 8)
- Chiara Camilleri – backing vocals (track 4)
- Daniele Folcarelli – guitar (track 2, 3, 7, 8, 10)
- Edoardo Castroni – songwriting (track 5) production (track 5)
- Edoardo Ruzzi – production (track 5)
- Eleonora Salmè – backing vocals (track 8)
- Federica Abbate – songwriting (track 9)
- Giorgio Pesenti – co-production (track 1, 5)
- Giulia Gentile – violin (track 3, 4, 7, 8, 9)
- Giulia Monciotti – backing vocals (track 8)
- Luca Caruso – piano (track 2, 7), drums (track 2, 3, 7)
- Margherita De Risi – backing vocals (track 8, 10)
- Simone Privitera – co-production (track 9), programming (track 9), sound design (track 9)

=== Technical ===
- Alessandro Casagni – engineering (all tracks)
- Dario Riboli – mastering (all tracks), mixing (all tracks)
- Luca Caruso – engineering (track 2, 3, 7)

=== Management ===
- Ditonellapiaga – executive production
- Andrea Esu – executive production

== Charts ==
Chart performance for Miss Italia
Chart (2026)	Peak position
Italian Albums (FIMI)	8
