= Insuperabile =

Single by Rkomi

from the album Taxi Driver+
- Released: 2 February 2022
- Genre: Rap rock
- Length: 2:52
- Label: Universal Music Italy
- Songwriters: Mirko Martorana; Alessandro La Cava; Francesco Catitti
- Producer: Katoo

Rkomi singles chronology
"La coda del diavolo" (2021)	"Insuperabile" (2022)	"5 gocce" (2022)

Music video
- "Insuperabile" on YouTube

"Insuperabile" is a song co-written and recorded by Italian rapper Rkomi. It was released on 2 February 2022 through Universal Music Italy, as the second single from the reissue of his third studio album Taxi Driver.

The song competed during the 72nd Sanremo Music Festival, Italy's musical festival which doubles also as a selection of the act for Eurovision Song Contest, where it placed 17th in the grand final.

== Critic reception ==
Andrea Laffranchi of il Corriere della Sera found in the rapper's artistic choice a search for "national-popular consensus," converting to music played and not rapped, arguing that the song "plays with rock stereotypes: a riff, foot-stomping drums, flames, and powerful engines." Andrea Conti of Il Fatto Quotidiano wrote that the single opens with "a sustained bass line that captivates from the first notes." Francesco Chignola of TV Sorrisi e Canzoni also reflected on the musical side, writing that it "starts off immediately with a powerful bass line, a fast beat, breaking down the boundaries between rap and rock, with an explosive orchestral finale," although he finds the lyrics a bit "full of automotive imagery."

== Music video ==
The music video for the song, directed by YouNuts!, was released on February 2, 2022, through the rapper's YouTube channel.

== Charts ==
=== Weekly charts ===
Chart performance for "Insuperabile"
Chart (2022)	Peak position
Italy (FIMI)	6
Italy Airplay (EarOne)	10

=== Year-end charts ===
Year-end chart performance for "Insuperabile"
Chart (2022)	Position
Italy (FIMI)	25

== Certifications ==
Certifications for "Insuperabile"
Region	Certification	Certified units/sales
Italy (FIMI)	3× Platinum	300,000^{‡}
^{‡} Sales+streaming figures based on certification alone.
