= Senza Cri =

Italian singer-songwriter (born 2000)

- Born: Cristina Carella; 21 March 2000 (age 26); Brindisi, Apulia, Italy
- Genres: Pop; alt-pop
- Occupations: Singer; songwriter
- Instruments: Vocals; guitar; piano
- Years active: 2021–present
- Labels: UtoPublishing (2021–2022); Gotham Dischi / Orangle (2022–2023); ADA / Warner Music Italy (2024–present)

Cristina Carella (born 21 March 2000), known professionally as Senza Cri, is an Italian singer-songwriter.

== Early life and education ==
Born in 2000 in Brindisi, in the Salento region of Apulia, to Enrica, a teacher and dancer, and Vincenzo Carella, a biologist, they began playing guitar at the age of three. At fourteen they played in their middle school orchestra, and began composing their first songs.

== Career ==
In 2021 Senza Cri released their first official single "Tu sai" and took part in the Area Sanremo singing competition with the song "A me", being then selected for Sanremo Giovani. On 15 December they participated in the final of Sanremo Giovani, failing to access the Sanremo Music Festival 2022. On 3 December 2021, the single "Amor 25 novembre" was released, dedicated to the victims of femicide.

On 14 January 2022 the single "Bordi" was released, which anticipated the release of the debut EP Salto nel vuoto, containing seven tracks and published on 18 January by the UtoPublishing label. The single "Amarsi un po'" was released on 25 February. They later also participated in the Porto Rubino event. The single "Non ti sopporto più" was released on 19 May 2023.

In September 2024, they joined the cast of the twenty-fourth edition of Canale 5's musical talent show Amici di Maria De Filippi, entering the initial phase. In March 2025, they entered the series phase of the show by joining the team led by coaches Lorella Cuccarini and Emanuel Lo, being eliminated during the fifth episode on 19 April.

During the show, they released several new songs, including "Madrid", "Tutto l'odio" and "Grande muraglia", followed by the single "Tokyo Nite", all four of which were later included in their second EP, Tokyo Nite, released on 30 May 2025 by ADA and Warner Music Italy, which also includes the songs "Harakiri" and "20xsempre". The EP debuted at number eighty-seven on the FIMI Albums Chart. Their new single "Anno del drago" was released on 19 September.

In October 2025, they were chosen to compete in Sanremo Giovani 2025, the youth selection for the Sanremo Music Festival 2026, with the song "Spiagge". After making it through the first round and the semifinal, they reached the final where they were eliminated.

== Personal life ==
Senza Cri is openly non-binary and prefers to use they/them pronouns. In 2025 they started dating singer Antonia Nocca, whom they met during their participation on the twenty-fourth edition of Amici di Maria De Filippi. Coincidentally, Nocca also entered Sanremo Giovani 2025 going on to reach the final like Carella.

== Discography ==
=== Extended plays ===
List of EPs and with selected chart positions
Title	EP details	Peak chart positions
Title	EP details	ITA
Salto nel vuoto	Released: 18 January 2022; Label: UtoPublishing; Format: CD, digital download, streaming	—
Tokyo Nite	Released: 30 May 2025; Label: ADA, Warner Music Italy; Format: CD, digital download, streaming	87
"—" denotes EP that did not chart or were not released.

=== Singles ===
==== As lead artist ====
List of singles and album name
Title	Year	Album or EP
"Tu sai"	2021	Salto nel vuoto
"A me"	2021	Salto nel vuoto
"Amor 25 novembre"	2021	Salto nel vuoto
"Bordi"	2022	Salto nel vuoto
"Tu sai"	2022	Salto nel vuoto
"Amarsi un po'"	2022	Non-album singles
"Non ti sopporto più"	2023	Non-album singles
"Madrid"	2024	Tokyo Nite
"Tutto l'odio"	2025	Tokyo Nite
"Grande muraglia"	2025	Tokyo Nite
"Tokyo Nite"	2025	Tokyo Nite
"Anno del drago"	2025	Non-album singles
"Spiagge"	2025	Non-album singles

== Television programs ==
Year	Title	Network	Notes
2024–2025	Amici di Maria De Filippi	Canale 5	Contestant (season 24)

== Participation in singing events ==
- Area Sanremo
  - 2021 – Selected for Sanremo Giovani with "A me"
- Sanremo Giovani (Rai 1)
  - 2021 – Not a finalist with "A me"
  - 2025 – Finalist with "Spiagge"
