= Aka 7even =

Italian singer-songwriter, rapper (born 2000)

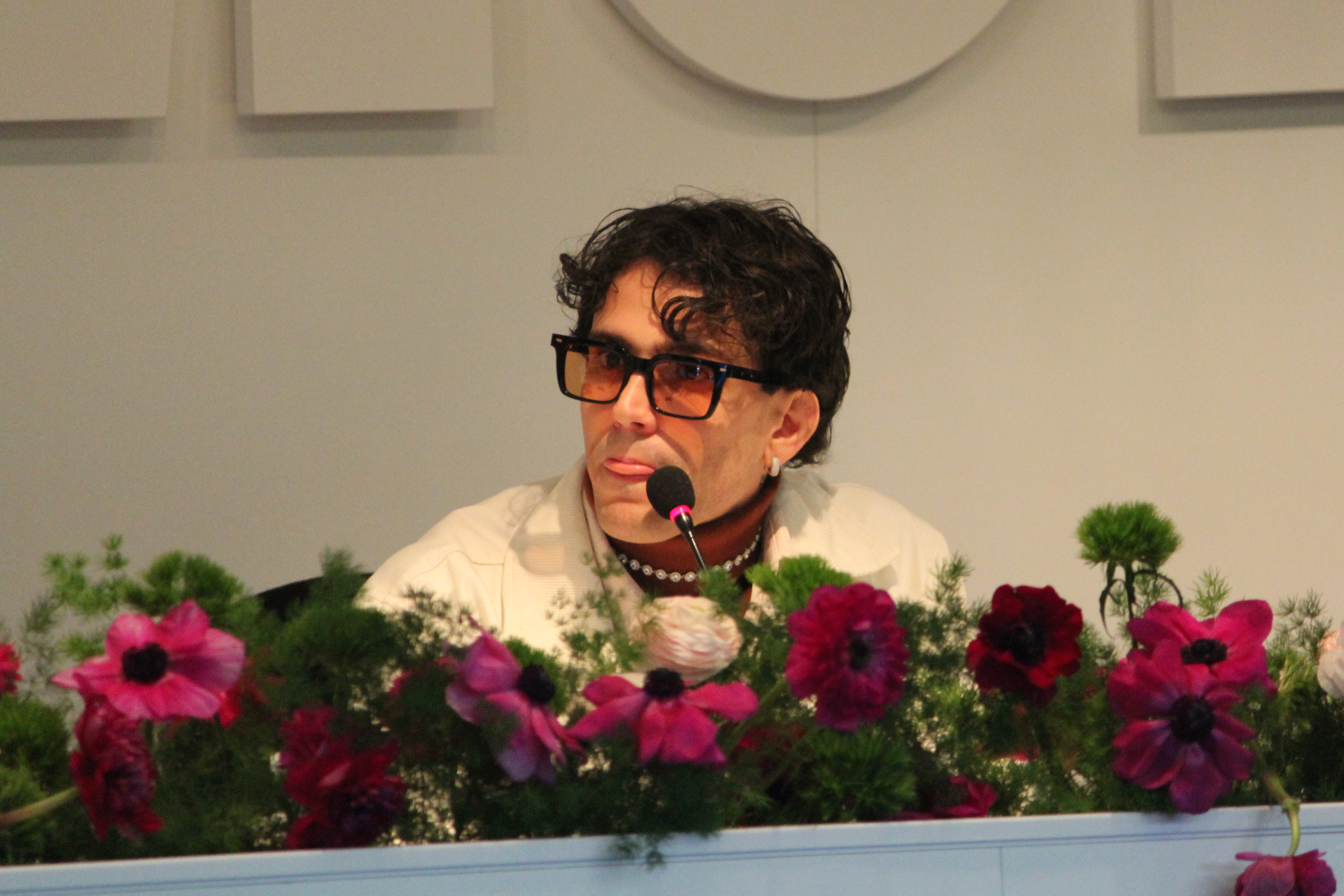
- Aka 7even in February 2026

Background information
- Born: Luca Marzano; 23 October 2000 (age 26); Vico Equense, Campania, Italy
- Genre: Pop
- Occupations: Singer; songwriter
- Instruments: Vocals; drums; guitar; piano
- Years active: 2017–present
- Label: Columbia

Luca Marzano (born 23 October 2000), known professionally as Aka 7even, is an Italian singer-songwriter and rapper.

== Life and career ==
In 2020, he took part at the 20th edition of the Italian talent show Amici di Maria De Filippi, where he ended up second in the "Singers" section behind to Sangiovanni and fourth overall. He released his first studio album Aka 7even in May 2021, which peaked at number three of FIMI's album chart and was certified platinum in Italy. On 14 November 2021, he won the MTV Europe Music Award for Best Italian Act at the 2021 MTV Europe Music Awards in Budapest, Hungary.

He competed at the Sanremo Music Festival 2022 with the song "Perfetta così". On 30 November 2025, he was announced alongside LDA among the participants of the Sanremo Music Festival 2026. They competed with the song "Poesie clandestine".

== Discography ==
=== Studio albums ===
List of studio albums, with chart positions and certifications
Title	Album details	Peak chart positions	Certifications
Title	Album details	ITA	Certifications
Aka 7even	Released: 21 May 2021; Label: Columbia, Sony Music; Format: CD, LP, digital download, streaming	3	FIMI: Platinum
Poesie clandestine (with LDA)	Released: 6 March 2026; Label: Columbia; Format: CD, LP, digital download, streaming	6	

=== Extended plays ===
List of extended plays
Title	EP details
Chiaroscuro (as Luca Marzano)	Released: 17 May 2019; Label: Cosmophonix Production; Format: CD, digital download, streaming
Non x soldi (with Junior K)	Released: 2 May 2025; Label: Columbia; Format: CD, digital download, streaming

=== Singles ===
List of singles as lead artist, with selected chart positions, showing year released and album name
Title	Year	Peak chart positions	Certifications	Album
Title	Year	ITA	Certifications	Album
"Torre Eiffel"	2019	—		Aka 7even
"Hotel" (with SAC1)	2020	—		Non-album singles
"Chupa" (with BossFamily)	2020	—		Non-album singles
"Coco" (with Biondo)	2020	—		Non-album singles
"Yellow"	2021	—		Aka 7even
"Mi manchi"	2021	4	FIMI: 2× Platinum	Aka 7even
"Mille parole"	2021	—		Aka 7even
"Loca" (solo or with Robledo)	2021	2	FIMI: 3× Platinum	Aka 7even
"6 PM"	2021	—		Non-album single
"Perfetta così"	2022	15	FIMI: Platinum	Non-album single
"Come la prima volta"	2022	—		Non-album single
"Toca" (with Gué Pequeno)	2022	61	FIMI: Gold	Non-album single
"Non piove più"	2022	—		
"Rock n Roll"	2023	—		
"Non dimenticare"	2024	—		
"Notte fonda"	2024	—		
"Non x soldi" (with Junior K)	2025	—		Non x soldi
"Ragione e follia" (with Tormento and Junior K)	2025	—		Non x soldi
"Poesie clandestine" (with LDA)	2026	6	FIMI: Gold	Poesie clandestine
"Andamento lento" (with LDA featuring Tullio De Piscopo)	2026	50		Poesie clandestine
"—" denotes a single that did not chart or was not released.

== Awards and nominations ==
Year	Ceremony	Category	Work	Result
2021	MTV Europe Music Awards	Best Italian Act	Himself	Won
2022	Kids' Choice Awards	Favorite Singer (Italy)	Himself	Won
