= La Rappresentante di Lista =

Italian pop rock duo

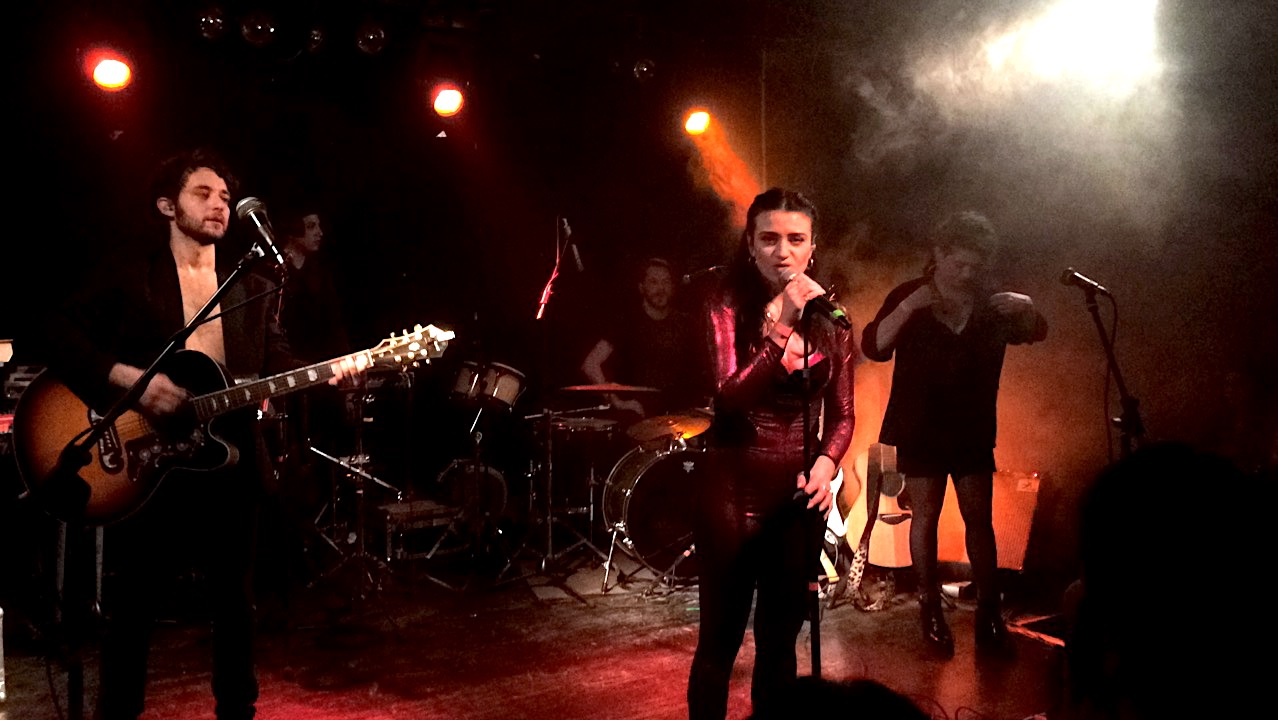
- La Rappresentante di Lista performing in 2018

Background information
- Origin: Valledolmo, Sicily, Italy
- Genres: Folk; trip hop; progressive rock; queer pop
- Years active: 2011–present
- Labels: Garrincha Dischi, Woodworm
- Members: Veronica Lucchesi; Dario Mangiaracina
- Website: lrdl.it

La Rappresentante di Lista (Italian for 'the List Representative'), also known by the acronym LRDL, is an Italian pop rock duo formed in 2011 and consisting of Veronica Lucchesi and Dario Mangiaracina.

== History ==
La Rappresentante di Lista was formed in the Sicilian city of Valledolmo by Veronica Lucchesi (born 17 October 1987, Pisa) and Dario Mangiaracina (born 21 March 1985, Palermo). They debuted in 2014 with the album (per la) Via di casa, released on the Garrincha Dischi label. This was followed in 2015 by Bu Bu Sad, on the same label.

In 2017, the band signed with Woodworm and released their third studio album, Go Go Diva, on 14 November 2018. It included the single "Questo corpo", which received praise from critics and was also part of the soundtrack of Paolo Sorrentino's TV series The New Pope.

La Rappresentante di Lista participated in the 2021 Sanremo Music Festival with the song "Amare", co-written and produced by Dardust. They finished in 11th position. On the third night, they performed with Donatella Rettore to cover her hit "Splendido splendente".

Their fourth album, My Mamma, was released on 5 March 2021 and included their Sanremo entry "Amare".

The duo again took part in the Sanremo Music Festival in 2022, with "Ciao ciao", finishing in seventh position. On the fourth night, they performed a cover of "Be My Baby" by the Ronettes, with Cosmo, Margherita Vicario and Ginevra. Following their Sanremo entry, they re-released My Mamma on 11 February 2022, with two bonus tracks—"Ciao ciao" and "Be My Baby (Ft. Cosmo, Ginevra, and Margherita Vicario)".

"Ciao ciao" was later featured in season 2, episode 6 of HBO's black comedy drama The White Lotus.

The duo also released a novel, entitled Maimamma, on 28 October 2021.

== Discography ==
=== Studio albums ===
List of studio albums, with chart positions and certifications
Title	Album details	Peak chart positions	Certifications
Title	Album details	ITA	Certifications
(Per la) via di casa	Released: 6 March 2014; Label: Garrincha; Format: CD, LP, digital download	—	
Bu Bu Sad	Released: 4 December 2015; Label: Garrincha; Format: CD, LP, digital download	—	
Go Go Diva	Released: 14 December 2018; Label: Woodworm; Format: CD, LP, digital download	—	
My Mamma	Released: 5 March 2021; Label: Woodworm; Format: CD, LP, digital download	5	FIMI: Platinum
Giorni felici	Released: 25 October 2024; Label: Woodworm; Format: CD, LP, digital download	37	

=== Live albums ===
List of live albums, with chart positions and certifications
Title	Album details	Peak chart positions	Certifications
Title	Album details	ITA	Certifications
Bu Bu Sad Live	Released: 7 March 2017; Label: Garrincha; Format: CD	—	

=== Singles ===
==== As lead artist ====
List of singles as lead artist, with chart positions, album name and certifications
Single	Year	Peak chart positions	Certifications	Album
Single	Year	ITA	Certifications	Album
"D.A.Q.C.M."	2014	—		Per la via di casa
"Bimba libre"	2014	—		Per la via di casa
"Invisibilmente"	2015	—		Bu Bu Sad
"Apriti cielo!"	2015	—		Bu Bu Sad
"Bora bora"	2017	—		Bu Bu Sad
"Questo corpo"	2018	—		Go Go Diva
"Woow"	2019	—		Go Go Diva
"Maledetta tenerezza"	2019	—		Go Go Diva
"Alieno"	2021	—		My Mamma
"Amare"	2021	11	FIMI: Platinum	My Mamma
"Vita"	2021	—		My Mamma
"Religiosamente"	2021	—		My Mamma
"Ciao ciao"	2022	3	FIMI: 4× Platinum	My Mamma (CiaoCiao Edition)
"Diva"	2022	—	FIMI: Gold	My Mamma (CiaoCiao Edition)
"Paradiso"	2024	—		Giorni felici
"La città addosso"	2024	—		Giorni felici

==== As featured artist ====
List of singles as featured artist, with chart positions, album name and certifications
Single	Year	Peak chart positions	Certifications	Album
Single	Year	ITA	Certifications	Album
"Ci diamo un bacio" (Dimartino featuring La Rappresentante di Lista)	2019	—		Afrodite
"Luce (tramonti a nord est)" (Rancore featuring La Rappresentante di Lista)	2020	—		Non-album single
"Tilt" (Marz & Zef featuring Elisa and La Rappresentante di Lista)	2023	—		Non-album single

=== Guest appearances ===
Title	Year	Other artist(s)	Album
"Attraverso te"	2022	Marco Mengoni	Materia (Pelle)

== Filmography ==
=== Veronica Lucchesi ===
Year	Title	Role	Notes
2020	Cacciatore: The Hunter	Maria Savoca	Recurring role (season 2)
2020	Gendernet: Internet e liberazione sessuale	Narrator	Documentary film
2024	Gloria!	Bettina	
