= TonyPitony =

Italian singer-songwriter and performer (born 1996)

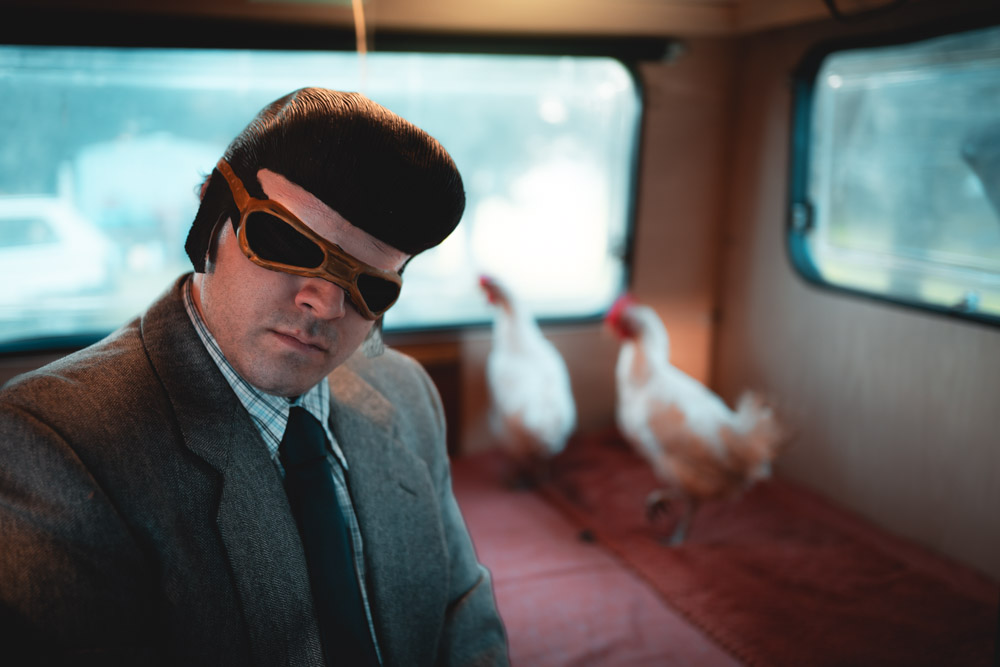
- TonyPitony in March 2025

Background information
- Born: 12 April 1996 (age 30); Syracuse, Sicily, Italy
- Genres: Satirical; electronic music; R&B; indie pop
- Occupation: Singer-songwriter
- Years active: 2020–present
- Website: oggettony.com

TonyPitony (born 12 April 1996) is an Italian singer-songwriter and performer known for his provocative and satirical songs blending electronic music and R&B atmospheres.

Active since 2020, he gained national prominence in 2025 following the viral success of several singles and live performances characterized by theatrical staging and controversial lyrics.

== Early and personal life ==
TonyPitony (whose real name has been alleged to be Ettore Ballarino or Simone De Simone) was born and raised in Syracuse, Sicily. After completing his secondary education at the liceo scientifico Einaudi, he moved at the age of 19 to Epsom, United Kingdom, where he received a scholarship in acting at Laine Theatre Arts college. He remained in the UK for approximately seven years, working as a voice actor and appearing in small theatre productions in London's West End, as well as performing in private shows for Scottish aristocratic audiences.

Following an unsuccessful audition for the musical Sister Act and the suspension of theatrical activities due to the COVID-19 pandemic, he began developing an independent artistic project under the pseudonym TonyPitony. Upon returning to Syracuse, he performed with the local band Sam & the Engineers, appearing on stage wearing an Elvis Presley mask.

== Career ==
=== 2020–2024: X Factor audition and first album ===
In July 2020, he independently released his debut studio album, Nel 2067, which combined electronic and dance sounds with irreverent and comedic lyrics. Later that year, he auditioned for the fourteenth season of X Factor Italia, performing a deliberately provocative neomelodic-style rendition of Leonard Cohen's "Hallelujah". Although judge Mika praised his vocal abilities, he was eliminated during the audition phase and did not advance to the live shows.

During the early years of his career, his popularity remained largely local, with performances primarily at small festivals and community events. In 2023 he released several singles, including "Striscia" which leaned toward indie pop influences, and "Donne ricche" and "Polietilene", which retained his earlier dance-oriented style. His visibility increased significantly through word-of-mouth and viral circulation on platforms such as TikTok.

=== 2025–present ===
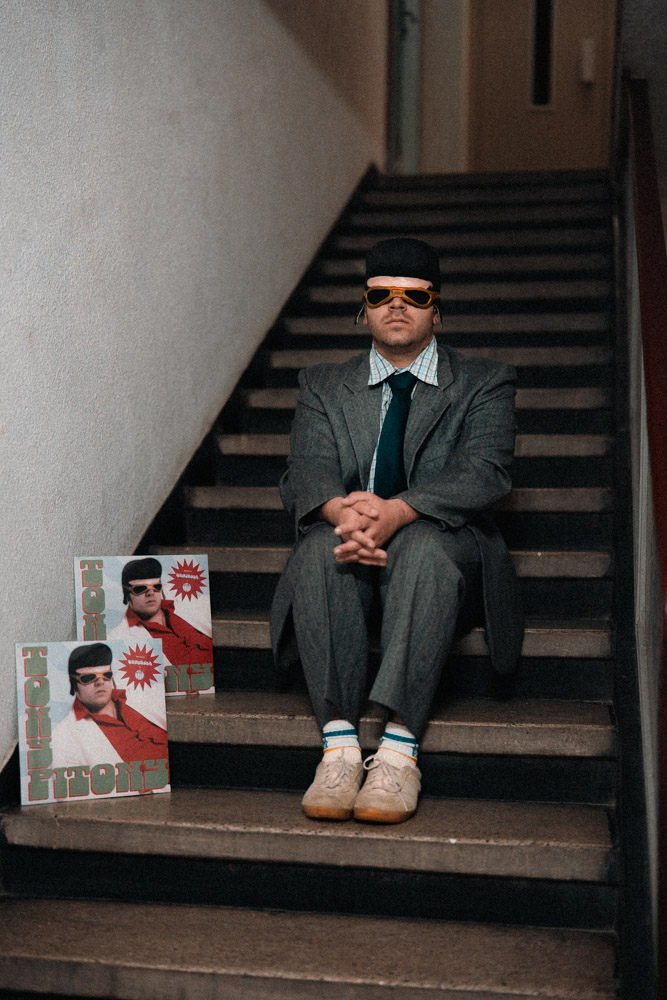
TonyPitony sitting next to copies of his eponymous album, April 2025

In April 2025, he released his second studio album, TonyPitony, also independently produced. After a modest initial reception, the album achieved wider commercial success thanks to the viral singles "Culo" and "Giovanni", both of which entered Spotify Viral 50 chart in Italy. Collaborations with online personalities, including YouTuber Favij, further expanded his audience.

Throughout 2025, TonyPitony performed at several Italian festivals and venues, including Poplar Festival in Trento, Hiroshima Mon Amour in Turin, Fabrique in Milan, and Estragon in Bologna. In December 2025, following the success of an acoustic performance accompanied by guitarist Marco Castello. he released the EP Peccato per i testi, featuring five acoustic versions of previously released songs. The acoustic version of "Donne ricche" became his first top-ten single on the FIMI Singles Chart, peaking at number two. The album TonyPitony also entered the FIMI Albums Chart, remaining for nine weeks and peaking at number nine.

In 2026, he was selected to perform the official theme song of the FantaSanremo game associated with the Sanremo Music Festival. He also appeared as a guest on Fiorello's television program La pennicanza and was confirmed as a guest performer during the cover night of Sanremo Music Festival 2026 in a duet with Ditonellapiaga, with the song "The Lady Is a Tramp"; their performance ultimately won the night. A summer tour titled Estatony was announced for 2026, with several dates selling out in advance. TonyPitony also collaborated with Canova on the single "English Lesson Number One", set to be released on 13 March 2026.

In early March 2026, an X user tweeted a photo allegedly depicting TonyPitony without his mask. The image garnered quick circulation but also raised questions regarding a possible violation of the artist's privacy.

== Musical style and themes ==
TonyPitony's music incorporates elements of comedy rock alongside R&B, electronic music, and indie pop songwriting. His production style is generally polished and aligned with contemporary mainstream trends.

His lyrics are known for their provocative, explicit, and often deliberately offensive content, including misogynistic and controversial stereotypes. In interviews, he has stated that this approach was partly intended to attract attention and generate public debate. His live performances are structured as theatrical shows combining music, comedy sketches, improvisation, and physical interaction with the audience.

Critical reception has been polarized. Some commentators have described his work as a sharp and unsettling reflection of contemporary pop culture, while others have criticized it as vulgar and regressive. His lyrics have also been accused of referencing themes associated with incel subculture.

== Discography ==
=== Studio albums ===
- Nel 2067 (with Jerry Canaglia) – 2020
- TonyPitony – 2025

=== Extended plays ===
- Peccato per i testi (Acoustic Version) – 2025

=== Singles ===
- "Cetorino" (featuring Jerry Canaglia) – 2020
- "Striscia" – 2023
- "Polietilene" – 2023
- "Donne ricche" – 2023
- "Anima mia" – 2024
- "Neopatentate" – 2024
- "Semicerchi" (featuring Nelson X) – 2024
- "Culo" – 2024
- "Giovanni" – 2025
- "Scapezzolate (Official Theme of FantaSanremo 2026)" – 2026
- "The Lady Is a Tramp" (with Ditonellapiaga) – 2026
- "English Lesson Number One" (Canova featuring TonyPitony) – 2026
- "L'ammor" (with Tommy Cash) – 2026
- "Cadillac" (Guè featuring TonyPitony and Shablo) – 2026
