= Tokyo Nite =

EP by Senza Cri
- Released: 30 May 2025
- Genre: Pop
- Length: 16:09
- Language: Italian
- Label: ADA; Warner Music Italy
- Producer: Fiodor; Stabber; Swan

Senza Cri chronology
Salto nel vuoto (2022)	Tokyo Nite (2025)

Singles from Tokyo Nite
- 1. "Madrid" Released: 12 November 2024; 2. "Tutto l'odio" Released: 14 January 2025; 3. "Grande muraglia" Released: 1 April 2025; 4. "Tokyo Nite" Released: 6 May 2025

Tokyo Nite is the second extended play by Italian singer-songwriter Senza Cri. It was released on 30 May 2025 by ADA and Warner Music Italy.

== Description ==
The EP, consisting of six songs and produced by the artist himself with Fiodor Fogliato, Stefano "Stabber" Tartaglini and Matteo "Swan" Soru, was released after the singer-songwriter's participation in the twenty-fourth edition of the talent show Amici di Maria De Filippi.

== Track listing ==
Tokyo Nite track listing
No.	Title	Writer(s)	Producer(s)	Length
1.	"Grande muraglia"	Cristiana Carella; Fiodor Fogliato; Stefano Tartaglini	Fiodor; Stabber	2:46
2.	"Harakiri"	Carella; Matteo Soru; Tartaglini	Stabber; Swan	2:57
3.	"Tokyo Nite"	Carella; Tartaglini	Stabber	2:38
4.	"Tutto l'odio"	Carella; Fogliato; Stefano Tartaglino	Fiodor	2:32
5.	"20xsempre"	Carella; Fogliato; Lorenzo Di Blasi; Tartaglini	Fiodor; Stabber	2:39
6.	"Madrid"	Carella; Fogliato; Soru	Stabber; Swan	2:34

== Charts ==
Chart performance for Tokyo Nite
Chart (2025)	Peak position
Italian Albums (FIMI)	87
