= Calibro 35 =

Italian cinematic funk band

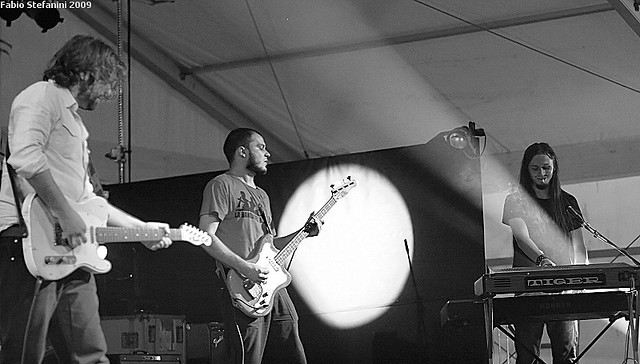
- Calibro 35 live in Osnago, 2010

Background information
- Origin: Milan, Italy
- Genres: Funk, jazz, alternative rock
- Years active: 2007–present
- Members: Tommaso Colliva; Enrico Gabrielli; Massimo Martellotta; Fabio Rondanini
- Website: www.calibro35.com

Calibro 35 is an Italian cinematic funk band formed in 2007 in Milan. The band has released numerous studio albums, live records, and movie soundtracks, gaining international recognition for their unique sound inspired by 1970s Poliziottesco films.

Their work has been extensively sampled by major global artists, including Dr. Dre for the album Compton and Jay-Z for the track "Picasso Baby".

== Biography ==
The band started in 2007 when producer Tommaso Colliva and guitarist Massimo Martellotta invited Enrico Gabrielli, Luca Cavina, and Fabio Rondanini to a studio project dedicated to re-recording obscure music from Italian exploitation movie soundtracks.

The first self-titled Calibro 35 album was released in 2008, featuring re-works of 1970s soundtracks by maestros such as Ennio Morricone, Armando Trovajoli, and Luis Bacalov. The critical acclaim led to international tours across Europe and the United States, including performances on KCRW's Morning Becomes Eclectic.

In 2010, their second album Ritornano quelli di... Calibro 35 was released, containing original songs written for the documentary Eurocrime!. One of the tracks, "Convergere in Giambellino", was used in the end credits of the film Red starring Bruce Willis. In June 2010, the band opened for Muse at the San Siro Stadium in Milan.

Throughout the following years, the group released several acclaimed albums including S.P.A.C.E. (2015), Decade (2018), and Momentum (2020), further establishing their reputation in the international funk and cinematic music scenes. In 2022, they released a two-volume tribute to Ennio Morricone titled Scacco al Maestro.

=== 2026 Winter Olympics ===
On 22 February 2026, Calibro 35 performed at the closing ceremony of the 2026 Winter Olympics, held at the Verona Arena. The band was featured during the official segment "The Beauty of Sharing: Parade of Athletes", providing the musical accompaniment for the world's athletes during the final event of the Games.

== Sampling ==
The band's work has become a significant source for hip hop and contemporary productions:

- "Ogni riferimento a fatti realmente accaduti" was sampled by Dr. Dre for "One Shot One Kill" (featuring Snoop Dogg).
- "Il consigliori" was sampled by Jay-Z for "Picasso Baby".
- "Una stanza vuota" was sampled by The Child of Lov for "One Day" (featuring Damon Albarn).
- "Eurocrime" was sampled by Demigodz for "Summer of Sam".

A complete list of artists who have sampled Calibro 35 is documented by the international database WhoSampled.

== Discography ==
=== Studio albums ===
- 2008 – Calibro 35
- 2010 – Ritornano quelli di... Calibro 35
- 2012 – Ogni riferimento a persone esistenti o a fatti realmente accaduti è puramente casuale
- 2012 – Nero e immobile (with Cesare Basile)
- 2013 – Traditori di tutti
- 2015 – S.P.A.C.E.
- 2018 – Decade
- 2020 – Momentum
- 2022 – Scacco al Maestro - Volume 1
- 2022 – Scacco al Maestro - Volume 2
- 2023 – Nouvelles Aventures
- 2025 – Exploration

=== Live albums ===
- 2016 – CLBR 35 Live From S.P.A.C.E.
- 2019 – High Tension Vol. 35
- 2021 – Live In Bklyn
- 2023 – Plays Morricone - Live

=== Compilations ===
- 2010 – Rare

== Soundtracks ==
- 2009 – SAID, feature film directed by Joseph Lefevre
- 2010 – R.E.D., end credits for the feature film directed by Robert Schwentke
- 2012 – Eurocrime!, documentary directed by Mike Malloy
- 2014 – Sogni di Gloria, feature film directed by Patrizio Gioffredi and John Snellinberg
- 2021/2023/2025 – Blanca, TV series
- 2023 – Diabolik Chi Sei?, opening and end credits for the film directed by Manetti Bros.
- 2025 – Sandokan, TV series
- 2025 – Ellroy vs L.A., documentary directed by Francesco Zippel
- 2026 – ChiaroScuro, TV series

== Personnel ==
=== Current members ===
- Enrico Gabrielli – keyboards, piano, woodwinds, percussion (2007–present)
- Massimo Martellotta – guitar, synthesizer (2007–present)
- Fabio Rondanini – drums (2007–present)
- Tommaso Colliva – production (2007–present)

=== Touring members ===
- Roberto Dragonetti – bass (2023–present)

=== Former members ===
- Luca Cavina – bass (2007–2023)
