= Ditonellapiaga =

Italian singer-songwriter (born 1997)

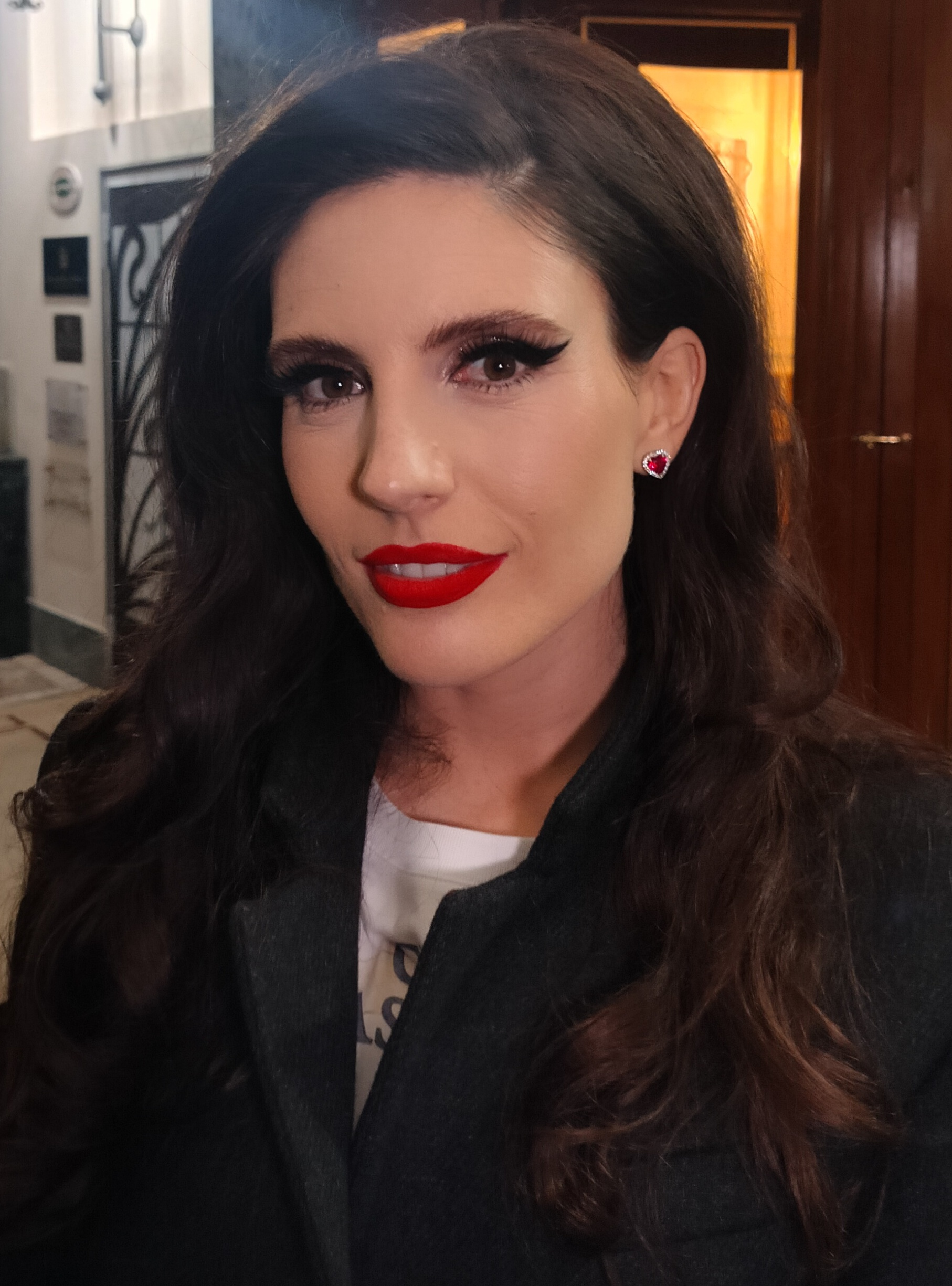
- Ditonellapiaga in February 2026

Background information
- Born: Margherita Carducci; 5 February 1997 (age 29); Rome, Lazio, Italy
- Genres: Pop; dance pop; electropop; indie pop
- Occupations: Singer; songwriter
- Years active: 2019–present
- Labels: Dischi Belli; BMG

Margherita Carducci (born 5 February 1997), known professionally as Ditonellapiaga, (Note: A univerbation of the Italian phrase dito nella piaga, 'finger in the wound' i.e. 'salt in the wound'.) is an Italian singer-songwriter.

== Life and career ==
Carducci was born in Rome. Her music career began in 2017 when she started playing with artists in the Roman music scene such as Alessandro Casagni, Lorenzo Taddei, and Flavio Calogero. After deciding to create a project with her original music, she started working in 2019 with the Roman producer duo Bbprod, with whom she released the debut single "Parli".

In October 2020, she obtained a recording contract with the label Dischi Belli, part of the BMG Rights Management group, and released a cover of Matia Bazar's song "Per un'ora d'amore", followed by the single "Morphina" in December.

In February 2021, she released "Spreco di potenziale", which took shape in the Italian indie pop sphere, single that anticipated the release of the debut EP entitled "Morsi", out on 23 April. In the same year, the cover of "Per un'ora d'amore" was included in the soundtrack of the film Anni da cane by Fabio Mollo.

Her debut album, Camouflage, was released on 14 January 2022. She participated at the Sanremo Music Festival 2022 alongside Donatella Rettore, with the song "Chimica".

On 30 November 2025, she was announced among the participants of the Sanremo Music Festival 2026, competing with the song "Che fastidio!". Her entry finished third overall, but her duet performance of "The Lady Is a Tramp" with TonyPitony won the cover night of the festival.

== Discography ==
=== Studio albums ===
Title	Details	Peak chart positions
Title	Details	ITA
Camouflage	Released: 11 January 2022; Label: BMG, Dischi Belli; Format: CD, LP, digital download, streaming	21
Flash	Released: 10 May 2024; Label: BMG, Dischi Belli; Format: CD, LP, digital download, streaming	54
Miss Italia	Released: 10 April 2026; Label: BMG, Dischi Belli; Format: CD, LP, digital download, streaming	8

=== Extended plays ===
Title	Details
Morsi	Released: 30 April 2021; Label: BMG, Dischi Belli; Format: digital download

=== Singles ===
List of singles as lead artist, with peak chart positions, showing year released and album name
Title	Year	Peak chart positions		Certifications	Album
Title	Year	ITA	SWI	Certifications	Album
"Parli"	2019	—	—		Non-album singles
"What About Us" (featuring Yorman)	2019	—	—		Non-album singles
"Per un'ora d'amore"	2020	—	—		Non-album singles
"Morphina"	2020	—	—		Camouflage
"Spreco di potenziale"	2021	—	—		Camouflage
"Non ti perdo mai"	2021	—	—		Camouflage
"Chimica" (with Donatella Rettore)	2022	9	—	FIMI: Platinum	Camouflage
"Disco (I Love It)"	2022	—	—		Non-album single
"Fossi come te"	2023	—	—		Flash
"È tutto vero"	2024	—	—		Flash
"Mary"	2024	—	—		Flash
"Tu con me hai chiuso"	2024	—	—		Flash
"Latitante"	2024	—	—		Flash
"ILY"	2024	—	—		Flash
"Ti voglio" (with Ornella Vanoni and Elodie)	2024	—	—		Diverse
"Cerco un uomo/Febbre d'amore"	2025	—	—		Non-album single
"Sì lo so"	2026	—	—		Miss Italia
"Che fastidio!"	2026	2	74	FIMI: Platinum	Miss Italia
"The Lady Is a Tramp" (with TonyPitony)	2026	29	—		Non-album single
"Hollywood"	2026	—	—		Miss Italia
"Businessman"	2026	—	—		Miss Italia
"—" denotes a single that did not chart or was not released.

== Filmography ==
=== Film ===
Year	Title	Role(s)	Notes
2026	Notte prima degli esami 3.0	Giulia	Acting debut; also performer and composer of the soundtrack "Le brave ragazze"
2026	Still Sexy	Herself	Cameo

== Awards and nominations ==
Year	Award	Category	Nominated work	Result
2019	MEI Award	MEI Young Artist Award	Herself	Won
2022	Premio Roma Videoclip	Breakthrough Video	"Chimica" (with Donatella Rettore)	Won
2022	Targa Tenco	Best Debut Album	Camouflage	Won
2026	Sanremo Music Festival	Best Cover Song	"The Lady Is a Tramp" (with TonyPitony)	Won
2026	Sanremo Music Festival	Giancarlo Bigazzi Award for Best Musical Composition	"Che fastidio!"	Won
2026	RTL 102.5 Radioshow Award	Best Airplay Song	"Che fastidio!"	Won
2026	Nastro d'Argento	Best Original Song	"Le brave ragazze"	Pending
2026	Billboard Italia Women in Music	Powerhouse Award	Herself	Honored
