= Music Band of the Guardia di Finanza =

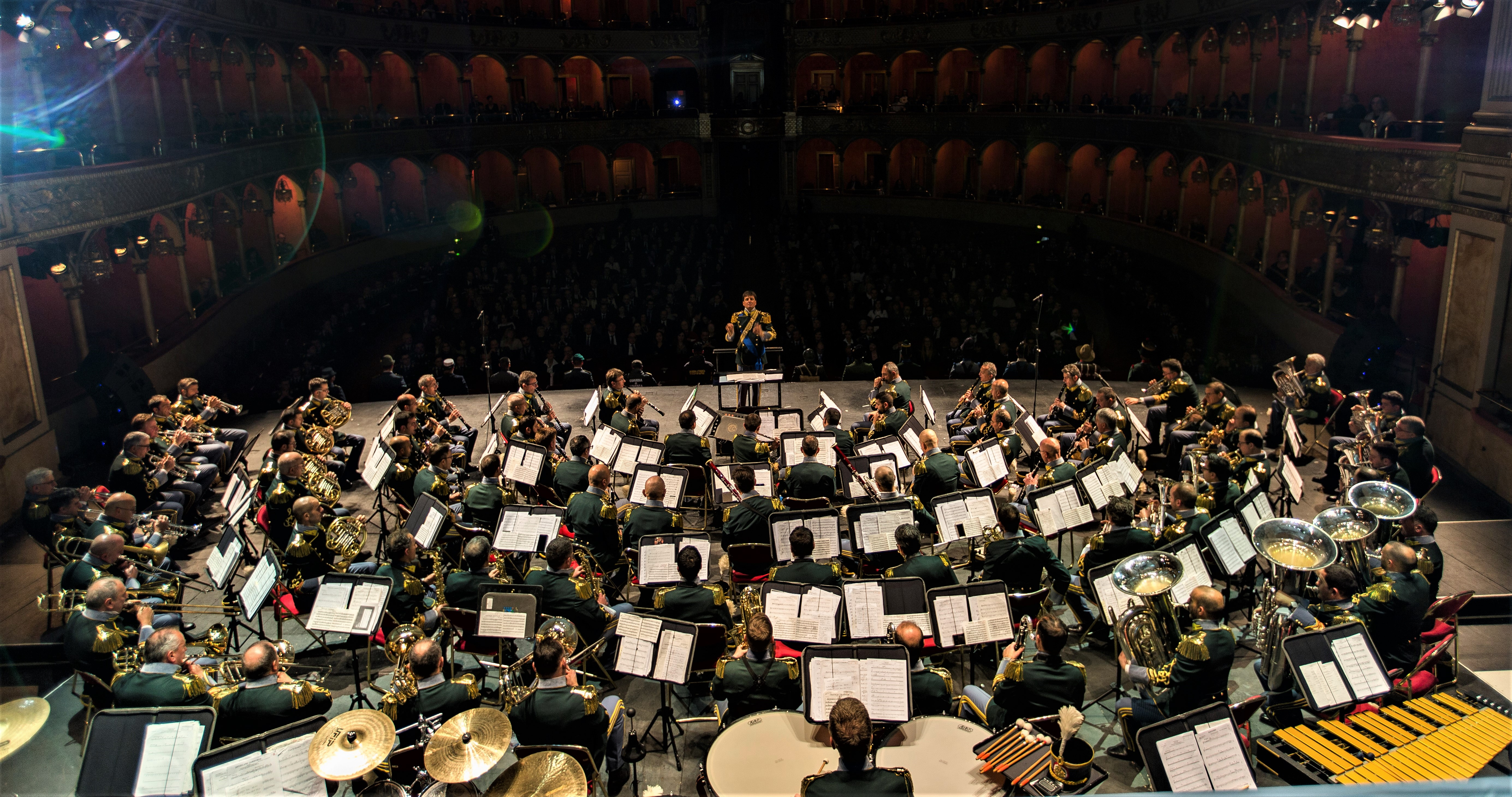
The band in 2022.

The Music Band of the Guardia di Finanza (Italian: Banda musicale della Guardia di Finanza) is the official military band of the Guardia di Finanza. The repertoire ranges from traditional military marches to opera music, from soundtracks to contemporary symphonic transcriptions, promoting the values of legality, service and national identity also through music. The band is composed of a master conductor, a deputy headmaster, 102 orchestral musicians, and an archivist. All members are financiers in permanent active service, recruited through public competitions based on qualifications and examinations, coming from Italian conservatories and higher institutes of musical studies, and placed in the role of performing inspectors.

== History ==
The band has its roots in the late 19th century, when, as early as 1883, local bands were established within various departments of the Corps for ceremonial and representative purposes. These groups also operated in functions related to public order, according to a musical tradition typical of the Royal Italian Army. After its debut in Piazza Colonna in Rome on 25 April 1925, a permanent national band was formally established in 1926, unifying the various pre-existing brass bands. The new group, based in Rome, was formed through a public competition and composed of musicians from the Corps and the civilian world, immediately assuming an official role in military ceremonies, oaths and representative events. During the Interwar period, the band consolidated its repertoire, specializing in the performance of military marches and symphonic transcriptions. During the Second World War, activity slowed but did not stop: the band continued to perform in a reduced form, taking part in ceremonies and commemorations.

After the Second World War, the band was reorganized, benefiting from the contribution of musicians graduated from the main Italian conservatories. From the 1950s and 1960s, public performances intensified in prestigious festivals and theatres, including the Festival dei Due Mondi and the Accademia Nazionale di Santa Cecilia. In 2002, the band performed in New York, at Ground Zero, on the occasion of Columbus Day, one year after the September 11 attacks.

== Master conductors ==
Director's name	Period	
Giuseppe Manente	April 25, 1925	February 3, 1932
Antonio D'Elia	1932	May 9, 1958
Olivio Di Domenico	1959	1979
Fulvio Creux	1982	1992
Gino Bergamini	1992	April 16, 2002
Leonardo Laserra Ingrosso	April 16, 2002	Present
