= The Lady Is a Tramp =

1937 musical theatre song

Song by Mitzi Green
- Published: 1937 by Chappell & Co.
- Genre: Showtune
- Composer: Richard Rodgers
- Lyricist: Lorenz Hart

"The Lady Is a Tramp" is a show tune and pop standard from the 1937 Rodgers and Hart musical Babes in Arms, in which it was introduced by former child star Mitzi Green. The song's use of the pejorative "tramp" doesn't literally mean the lady is a prostitute, but instead sarcastically spoofs New York high society and its strict etiquette (the first line of the verse is "I get too hungry for dinner at eight...") and phony social pretensions.

== Recordings ==
Early recordings from 1937 include one by Tommy Dorsey and His Orchestra (featuring Edythe Wright on vocals), Midge Williams and Her Jazz Jesters, Sophie Tucker, and Bernie Cummins on the Vocalion records label (#3714).

The song appears in the film version of Babes in Arms (1939) as an instrumental version only.

Lena Horne recorded the song with the Metro-Goldwyn-Mayer Studio Orchestra on March 30, 1948. Her performance appeared in the film Words and Music, a fictionalized biography of the partnership of Rodgers and Hart.

The song was also used in the film version of Pal Joey (1957) starring Frank Sinatra and Rita Hayworth. Joey Evans (Sinatra) sings the song to Vera Simpson (Hayworth) as he tries to entice the wealthy widow Simpson into financing Evans's dream of owning his own night club.

It was recorded by Frank Sinatra, Ella Fitzgerald, Buddy Greco (whose version updates the lyrics to include several 1950s pop-culture references), Bing Crosby (for his radio shows) and Pat Suzuki in the 1950s, and Shirley Bassey in the 1960s, becoming a signature song for Sinatra. He sang the song with new lyrics as "The Gentleman Is a Champ" at tribute events for Spiro Agnew and Orson Welles, also recording a new version under the pseudonym Frankie Alvert titled "Maureen Is a Champ" for Ringo Starr's wife Maureen Starkey; never commercially released.

=== Tony Bennett and Lady Gaga duet ===
"The Lady Is a Tramp"

Single by Tony Bennett and Lady Gaga

from the album Duets II
- Released: October 21, 2011
- Recorded: July 31, 2011
- Studio: Avatar (New York, New York)
- Genre: Swing; jazz
- Length: 3:18
- Label: Columbia
- Songwriters: Richard Rodgers; Lorenz Hart
- Producers: Phil Ramone; Dae Bennett

Tony Bennett singles chronology
"Body and Soul" (2011)	"The Lady Is a Tramp" (2011)	"Don't Get Around Much Anymore" (2011)

Lady Gaga singles chronology
"You and I" (2011)	"The Lady Is a Tramp" (2011)	"Marry the Night" (2011)

Music video
- "The Lady Is a Tramp" on YouTube

Tony Bennett and Lady Gaga recorded a version for Bennett's 2011 album Duets II. It later became the album's third and final single when Sony Music sent it to radio in Italy on October 21. Even though not officially released, it reached the top 40 of Japan Hot 100 chart and entered the top 200 extension to the UK Singles Chart. The duo also performed the song on ABC's Thanksgiving special entitled A Very Gaga Thanksgiving.

The duo's music video for the track, showing Bennett and Gaga singing together in a studio in front of music stands, received a largely positive critical reception.

The track as well as its music video received critical acclaim for both Bennett and Gaga's vocals as well as for the simplicity of the video, which departed from Gaga's previous efforts.

Weekly chart performance for "The Lady Is a Tramp"
Chart (2011)	Peak position
Belgium (Ultratip Bubbling Under Wallonia)	16
Italy (FIMI)	50
Japan Hot 100 (Billboard)	33
UK Singles (Official Charts Company)	188
US Bubbling Under Hot 100 (Billboard)	21
US Jazz Digital Songs (Billboard)	1

=== Ditonellapiaga and TonyPitony duet ===
In 2026, a duet by Italian singers Ditonellapiaga and TonyPitony, based on the Tony Bennett and Lady Gaga cover, premiered during the cover night at the 76th edition of the Sanremo Music Festival, which it won, eventually being released as a single. The version performed live at Sanremo contains a short excerpt from Alberto Rabagliati's song "Ba ba baciami piccina".

== In popular culture ==
- The 1955 Disney animated classic Lady and the Tramp is a play off the song's name.
- A 1974 TV commercial for the Chrysler Plymouth Scamp car featured a parody: "That's why this lady drives a Scamp."
- The 1997 Spice Girls song "The Lady Is a Vamp" is a play off the song title.
- In the eighteenth episode of the first season of Glee, "Laryngitis", Noah Puckerman (Mark Salling) performs the song as a duet with Mercedes Jones (Amber Riley).
- Carol-Lynne performs the song in the third episode of The Playboy Club.
- They Might Be Giants recorded an instrumental track that interpreted the song.
- In a 1999 episode of Star Trek: Deep Space Nine, the Ferengi Rom auditions for Vic Fontaine's nightclub with the song, singing it as "the lady is a scamp."
