= Ciao ciao (song) =

Single by La Rappresentante di Lista

from the album My Mamma Ciao ciao Edition
- Released: 2 February 2022
- Genre: Pop rock
- Length: 3:04
- Label: Woodworm, Numero Uno
- Songwriters: Veronica Lucchesi; Dario Mangiaracina; Roberto Calabrese; Roberto Cammarata; Carmelo Drago; Simone Privitera
- Producers: Simone Privitera; Papa D; Piccolo Cobra

La Rappresentante di Lista singles chronology
| "Religiosamente" (2021) | "Ciao ciao" (2022) | "Diva" (2022) |

Music video
- "Ciao ciao" on YouTube

"Ciao ciao" is a 2022 song by Italian band La Rappresentante di Lista. It was written by band members Veronica Lucchesi and Dario Mangiaracina with Roberto Calabrese, Roberto Cammarata, Carmelo Drago and Simone Privitera.

It was released by Woodworm and Numero Uno on 2 February 2022 as the second single from the digital re-issue of My Mamma. The song was the band's entry for the Sanremo Music Festival 2022, the 72nd edition of Italy's musical festival which doubles also as a selection of the act for the Eurovision Song Contest, where it placed 7th in the grand final. "Ciao ciao" peaked at number 3 on the Italian Singles Chart and was certified triple platinum by FIMI.

The song was featured in season 2, episode 6 of the American television series The White Lotus.

== Music video ==
The music video for the song was released on YouTube on the same day of the single's release. It was directed by Simone Rovellini and filmed at the BigMotion Studio in Cologno Monzese, Milan. The video also includes a cameo of Italian American journalist Peter Gomez.

== Personnel ==
Credits adapted from Tidal.

- Veronica Lucchesi – associated performer, composer, lyricist, vocals
- Dario Mangiaracina – associated performer, composer, lyricist
- Roberto Calabrese – composer
- Roberto Cammarata – composer
- Carmelo Drago – composer
- Papa D – producer
- Piccolo Cobra – producer
- Simone Privitera "Simon Says" – producer, composer

== Track listing ==
Digital download
| No. | Title | Length |
|---|---|---|
| 1. | "Ciao ciao" | 3:04 |

== Charts ==
=== Weekly charts ===
Weekly chart performance for "Ciao ciao"
| Chart (2022) | Peak position |
|---|---|
| Italy (FIMI) | 3 |
| Italy Airplay (EarOne) | 1 |
| Switzerland (Schweizer Hitparade) | 44 |

=== Year-end charts ===
Year-end chart performance for "Ciao ciao"
| Chart (2022) | Position |
|---|---|
| Italy (FIMI) | 10 |

== Certifications ==
| Region | Certification | Certified units/sales |
|---|---|---|
| Italy (FIMI) | 3× Platinum | 300,000^{‡} |
^{‡} Sales+streaming figures based on certification alone.
