= Highsnob =

Italian rapper and singer

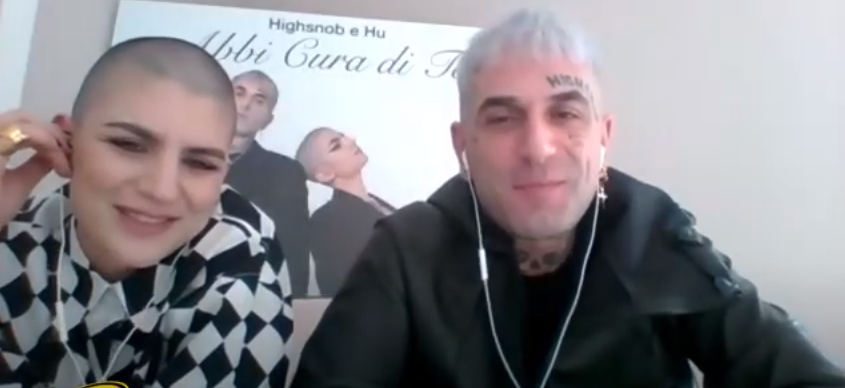
- Highsnob with Hu in 2022

Background information
- Born: Michele Matera; 2 August 1985 (age 40); Avellino, Campania, Italy
- Genres: Pop rap
- Occupations: Singer; songwriter; rapper
- Years active: 2013–present

Michele Matera (born 2 August 1985), known professionally as Highsnob, is an Italian rapper and singer.

He participated alongside Hu at the Sanremo Music Festival 2022, with the song "Abbi cura di te".

== Discography ==
=== Studio albums ===
- Bipopular (2018)
- Yang (2020)
- Kintsugi (2024)

=== Extended plays ===
- Prettyboy (2017)
- Yin (2019)
