= Yuman (singer) =

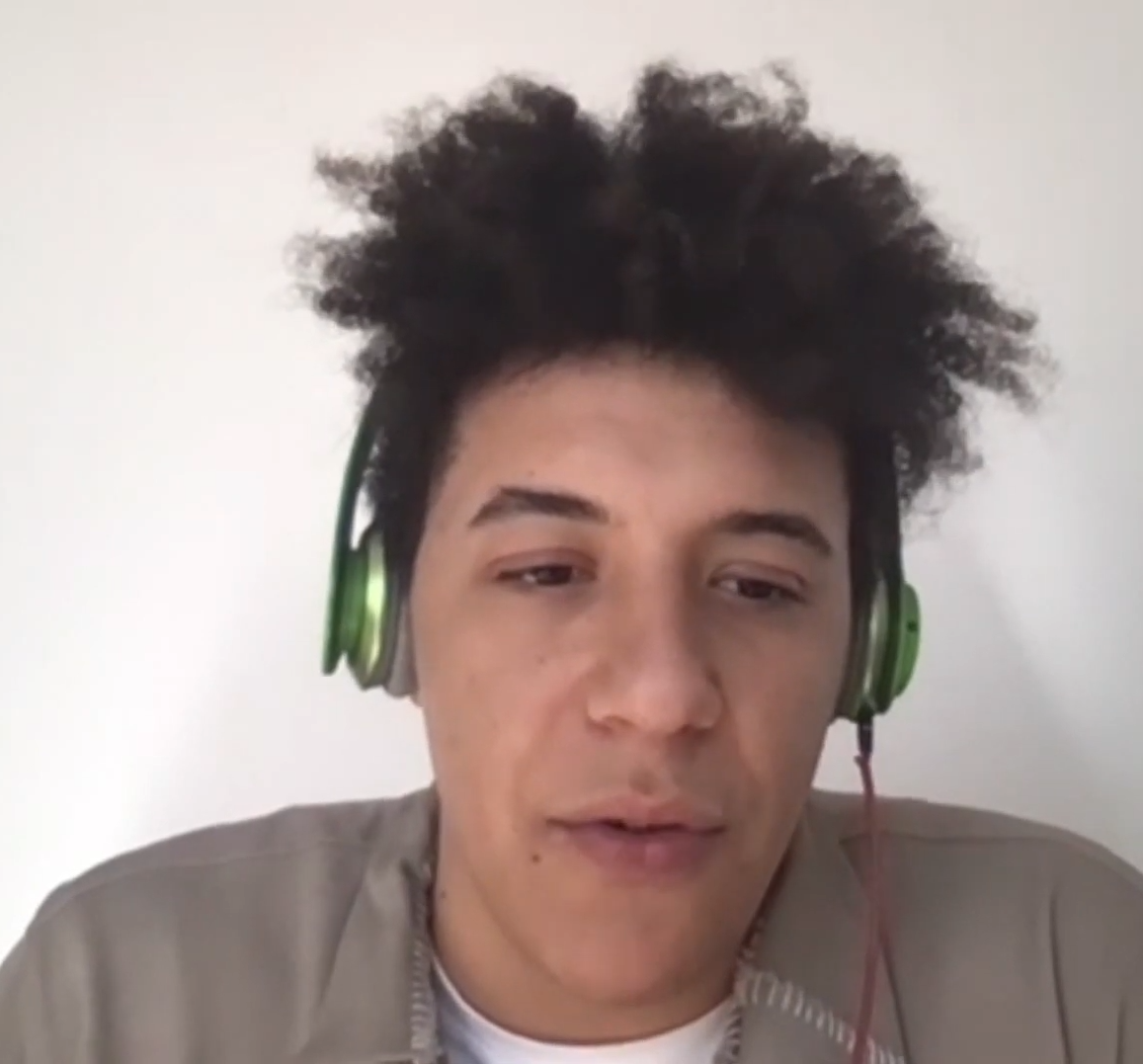

Background information
- Born: Yuri Santos Tavares Carloia; 11 August 1995 (age 30); Rome, Lazio, Italy
- Genres: Pop
- Occupations: Singer; songwriter
- Instrument: Vocals
- Years active: 2018–present
- Label: Universal Music Italia

Yuri Santos Tavares Carloia (born on 11 August 1995), known professionally as Yuman, is an Italian singer-songwriter.

== Biography ==
Born in Rome to a Cape Verdean father and an Italian mother, Yuman was raised around Valle Aurelia, a metropolitan district of Rome. During his first musical studies he decided to undertake a series of trips between London and Berlin, which allowed him to broaden his horizons.

His music career began in 2016, with the meeting of record producer Francesco Cataldo who offered him a recording contract with the label Leave Music. In 2018 Cataldo produced Yuman's debut single "Twelwe", which was on rotation on mainstream Italian radio.

In 2019 he obtained a recording contract with the label Universal Music Italia, with whom he released his debut studio album "Naked Thoughts", which was anticipated by the single "Run".

In November 2021, Yuman was one of 12 acts selected to compete in Sanremo Giovani, a televised competition aimed at selecting three newcomers as contestants of the 72nd Sanremo Music Festival. Yuman placed first during the show, with his entry "Mille notti", by rightfully accessing the festival in the Campioni category. "Ora e qui" was later announced as his entry for the Sanremo Music Festival 2022.

== Discography ==
=== Studio albums ===
- Naked Thoughts (2019)
- Qui (2022)

=== Singles ===
- "Twelve" (2018)
- "Run" (2019)
- "Somebody to Love" (2019)
- "I Will" (2019)
- "I Am" (2021)
- "Mille notti" (2021)
- "Ora e qui" (2022)
