= Dove si balla =

Single by Dargen D'Amico

from the album Nei sogni nessuno è monogamo
- Released: 2 February 2022
- Length: 3:18
- Label: Giada Mesi / Universal
- Songwriters: Dargen D'Amico; Edwyn Roberts; Gianluigi Fazio; Andrea Bonomo
- Producers: Dana; Edwyn Roberts

Dargen D'Amico singles chronology
"Katì" (2021)	"Dove si balla" (2022)	"La bambola" (2022)

Music video
- "Dove si balla" on YouTube

"Dove si balla" ('Where we dance') is a 2022 song by Dargen D'Amico, from his studio album Nei sogni nessuno è monogamo.

The song was written by D'Amico with Edwyn Roberts, Gianluigi Fazio and Andrea Bonomo. It was D'Amico's entry for the 72nd edition of the Sanremo Music Festival, where it placed 9th.

The lyrics talk of the human being's need for movement, with references to migration and COVID-19. The music has been described as a mix between dance-electronic, 1990s, Eurodance, and art rap.

== Track listing ==
Digital download
No.	Title	Length
1.	"Dove si balla"	3:18

== Charts ==
=== Weekly charts ===
Weekly chart performance for "Dove si balla"
Chart (2022–5)	Peak position
Italy (FIMI)	3
Italy Airplay (EarOne)	3
Switzerland (Schweizer Hitparade)	70

=== Year-end charts ===
Year-end chart performance for "Dove si balla"
Chart (2022)	Position
Italy (FIMI)	3

== Certifications ==
Region	Certification	Certified units/sales
Italy (FIMI)	7× Platinum	700,000^{‡}
^{‡} Sales+streaming figures based on certification alone.
