= Matteo Romano =

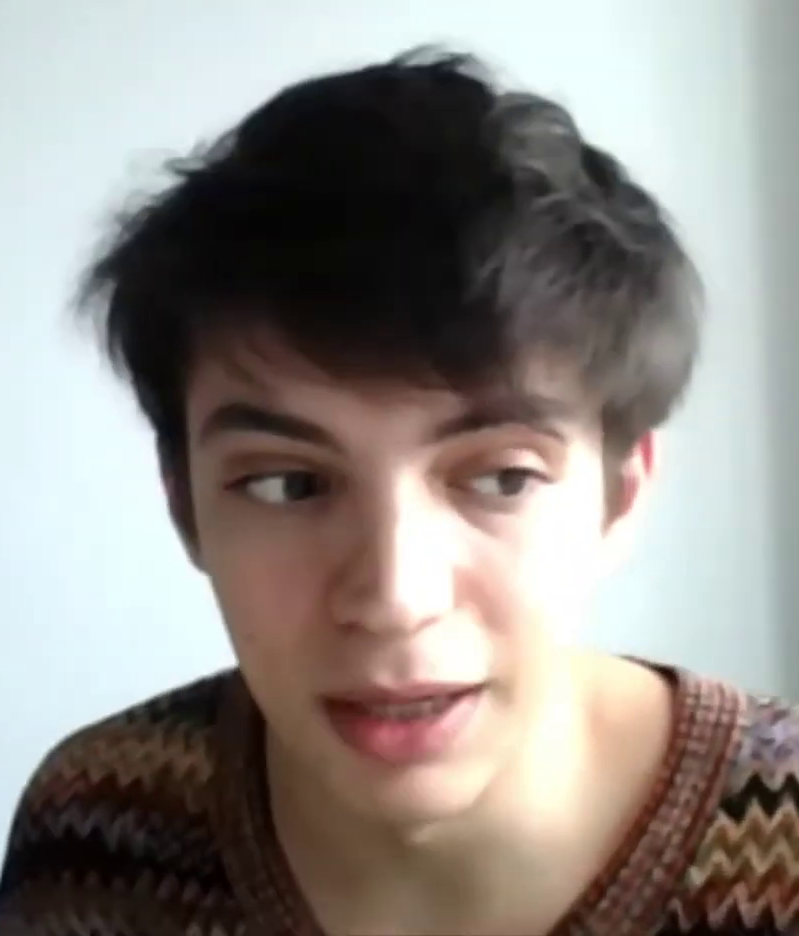
- Romano in 2022

Background information
- Born: Matteo Romano; 20 March 2002 (age 24); Cuneo, Piedmont, Italy
- Genres: Pop
- Occupations: Singer; songwriter
- Instruments: Vocals; piano
- Years active: 2020–present
- Label: Universal Music Italia

Matteo Romano (born 20 March 2002) is an Italian singer-songwriter.

== Biography ==
Romano was born in Cuneo. His music career began in 2020 when he released a preview of what will become his debut single "Concedimi" on the social platform TikTok. The video went viral in Italy, reaching over 3 million likes. The single was subsequently published on all platforms on the following 17 November.

In March 2021, he obtained a recording contract with the label Universal Music Italia, and released the next single "Casa di specchi". In November 2021, Romano was one of 12 acts selected to compete in Sanremo Giovani, a televised competition aimed at selecting three newcomers as contenstants of the 72nd Sanremo Music Festival. Romano placed third during the show, with his entry "Testa e croce", by rightfully accessing the festival in the Campioni category. "Virale" was later announced as his entry for the Sanremo Music Festival 2022.

In September 2023 he dueted on Cian Ducrot's "Part of Me" song.

== Discography ==
=== Singles ===
List of singles as lead artist, with selected chart positions, showing year released and album name
Title	Year	Peak chart positions	Certifications
Title	Year	ITA	Certifications
"Concedimi"	2020	13	FIMI: 2× Platinum
"Casa di specchi"	2021	—	
"Testa e croce"	2021	—	
"Virale"	2022	10	FIMI: Platinum
"Apatico"	2022	—	
"Tramontana"	2022	—	
"Tremo (Midnight)"	2022	—	
"Tulipani blu" (feat. Luigi Strangis)	2023	—	
"Part of Me" (with Cian Ducrot)	2023	—	
"Assurdo"	2024	—	
"—" denotes a single that did not chart or was not released.
