= Hu (singer) =

Italian singer-songwriter

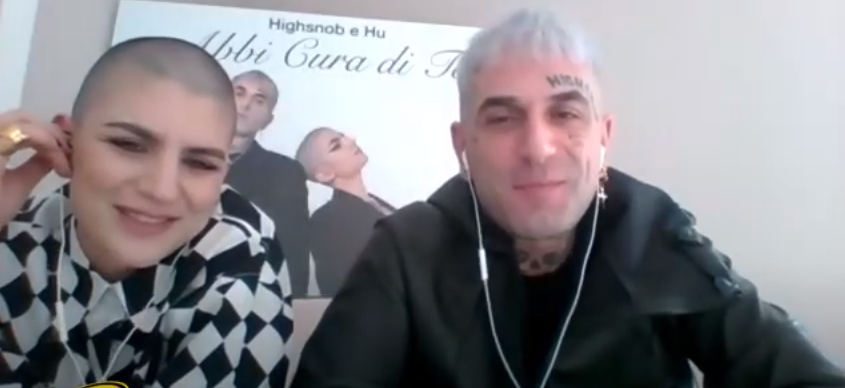
- Hu with Highsnob in 2022

Background information
- Born: Federica Ferracuti; 11 April 1994 (age 31); Fermo, Marche, Italy
- Genres: Electropop
- Occupations: Singer; songwriter; multi-instrumentalist; record producer
- Years active: 2017–present
- Label: Warner

Federica Ferracuti (born 11 April 1994), known professionally as Hu, is an Italian singer-songwriter, musician and record producer.

== Biography ==
Ferracuti was born in Fermo and learned to play guitar at a young age, especially jazz music. She graduated in sound design at the Conservatorio Rossini in Pesaro, and started writing her own music under the pseudonym of "Hu", after the Ancient Egyptian god of the same name.

During her early music career, she composed advertising songs for several brands, including Lamborghini and Jägermeister, and for the 2018 summer collection of Chiara Ferragni. In 2020, she made it into the finals of Sanremo Giovani with her song "Occhi Niagara", but did not manage to qualify for the "Newcomers" section of the Sanremo Music Festival 2021.

She participated alongside Highsnob at the Sanremo Music Festival 2022, with the song "Abbi cura di te".

== Discography ==
=== Studio albums ===
- Numeri primi (2022)

=== Singles ===
- "Neon" (2020)
- "Occhi Niagara" (2020)
- "End" (feat. M.E.R.L.O.T.) (2021)
- "Millemila" (2021)
- "Abbi cura di te" (with Highsnob) (2022)
- "Avec moi" (2022)
- "Limiti" (2023)
- "Body Soul Heart" (2023)
- "How Do U Feel" (2023)
- "Love, Don't Cry" (2024)
