= Drusilla Foer =

Italian drag queen (born 1967)

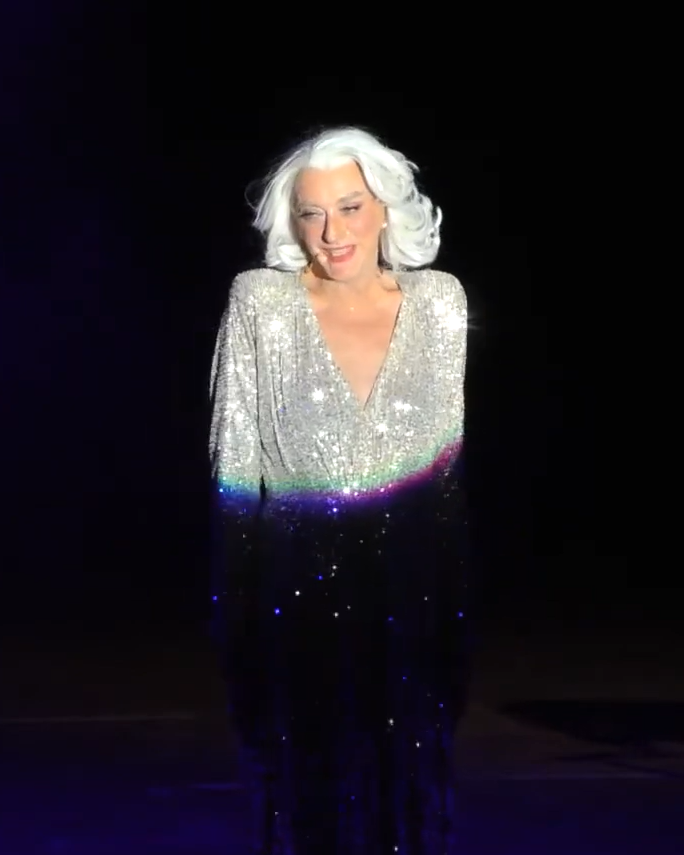
- Drusilla Foer in 2022
- Born: Gianluca Gori; 1967 (age 58–59); Florence, Italy
- Occupations: Drag queen; television personality; comedian; actor; theater director
- Years active: 2011–present

Gianluca Gori (born 1967), better known by the stage name Drusilla Foer, is an Italian drag queen and television personality.

== Early life ==
Gianluca Gori was born in Florence. Before inventing the character of Drusilla Foer, he worked as an actor and theater director. He also worked as a photographer and was involved with fashion and design. Little else is known about his personal life. When asked where Gianluca Gori ends and the character of Drusilla Foer begins, Foer stated that, "There are no limits. Because Drusilla doesn't take up anyone's space. It's all natural."

== Career ==
In 2017, Foer was a host of StraFactor, a late night "anti-talent" show that parodied X Factor. She published a novel titled You Don't Know Shame (Italian: Tu non conosci la vergogna) in 2021.

In February 2022, Foer co-hosted the third evening of the Sanremo Music Festival 2022, bringing her mainstream fame in Italy. After the show, she received many offers to host other programs, but rejected most of them. In May, Foer co-hosted the 67th David di Donatello with Carlo Conti. That year, she was the second-most-searched person on Google in Italy after Vladimir Putin. The following year, she was a guest during the second evening of the Sanremo Music Festival 2023.

== Filmography ==
=== Film ===
Year	Title	Role	Notes	Ref.
2012	Magnificent Presence	Ennio	as Gianluca Gori	
2017	Bloody Richard	Doctor		
2021	Forever Out of My League	Marta's grandmother		
2023	Il cacio con le pere	Mastini		
2023	Cattiva coscienza	President		

=== Television ===
Year	Title	Role	Notes	Ref.
2012	The Show Must Go Off	Self		
2017	StraFactor	Self	Judge	
2018–2020	CR4 - La Repubblica delle Donne	Self		
2020	L'ultima de' Medici	Madame Du Deffand		
2021	Ciao maschio	Self		
2022	Sanremo Music Festival 2022	Self	Co-host, night 3	
2022	67th David di Donatello	Self	Host	
2022	Drusilla e l'almanacco del giorno dopo	Self	Host	
2023	Sanremo Music Festival 2023	Self	Guest	
2024	Everything Calls for Salvation	Matilde		

== Bibliography ==
- Foer, Drusilla (2021). Tu non conosci la vergogna (in Italian). Mondadori. ISBN 978-8804738299.
