= Splendido splendente =

Single by Donatella Rettore

from the album Brivido divino
- B-side: "Salvami"
- Released: 1979
- Length: 3:24
- Label: Ariston
- Songwriters: Rettore, Claudio Rego

Donatella Rettore singles chronology
"Eroe" (1978)	"Splendido splendente" (1979)	"Kobra" (1980)

Audio
- "Splendido splendente" on YouTube

"Splendido splendente" (transl. 'Glittering and fabulous') is a 1979 Italian song by Donatella Rettore from her album Brivido divino.

== Overview ==
The song marked the domestic breakout of Rettore, following her earlier success in German-speaking countries. The lyrics deal with forward-thinking themes for the time such as cosmetic surgery and non-binary identities. Rettore got inspiration from the song after reading of Marilyn Monroe's cosmetic surgery. In a few months, the single sold over 300,000 copies.

== Track listing ==
No.	Title	Writer(s)	Length
1.	"Splendido splendente"	Rettore, Rego	3:24
2.	"Salvami"	Rettore, Rego	4:33

== Charts ==
Chart performance for "Splendido splendente"
Chart (1979)	Peak position
Italy (Musica e dischi)	4

== Certifications ==
Region	Certification	Certified units/sales
Italy Sales as of January 1980	—	300,000
Italy (FIMI) Sales from 2009	Gold	50,000^{‡}
^{‡} Sales+streaming figures based on certification alone.
