= Harlem Gospel Choir =

American gospel choir

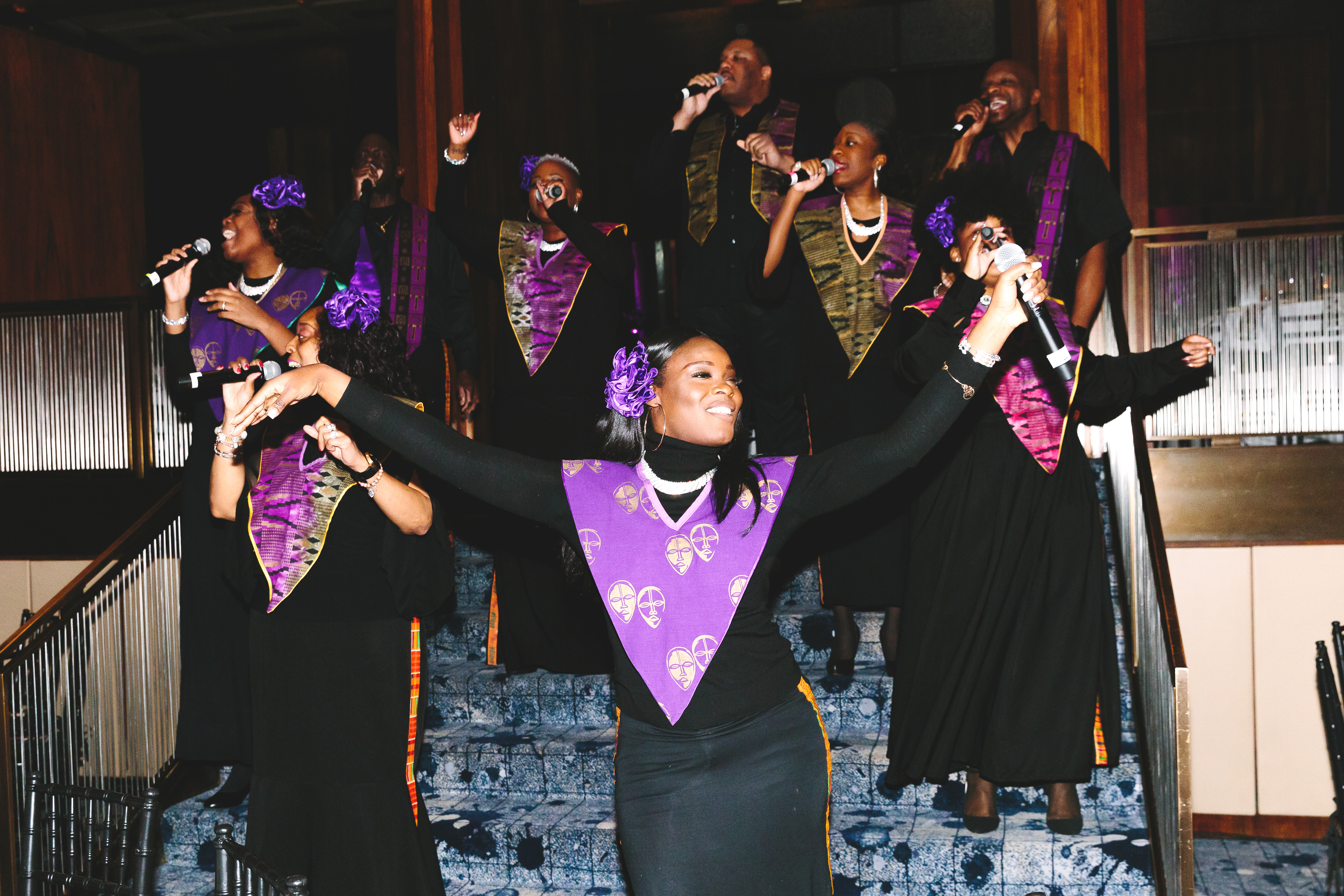
Harlem Gospel Choir perform at The Art Production Fund Gala, NYC March 11, 2019

The Harlem Gospel Choir is an American gospel choir based in Harlem, New York. It is one of the United States's most prominent gospel choirs.

The company comprises 40 members, ranging in age from 21 to 51. They have appeared on national television programs including Good Morning America, Top Chef: New York, The Colbert Report and The Late Show with Stephen Colbert. They have performed for Pope John Paul II and Presidents Carter and Obama. They have performed with The Chieftains, Diana Ross, Whoopi Goldberg, Harry Belafonte, Danny Glover, the Dixie Hummingbirds, Jimmy Cliff, Lyle Lovett, Lisa Marie Presley, Bono, André Rieu and his Johann Strauss Orchestra, Jessica Simpson, Josh Groban, Trace Adkins, American Authors, Nile Rodgers, Judy Collins, Achille Lauro and Volbeat.

The group was founded on Martin Luther King Jr.'s birthday, in 1986 (January 15, 1986) by Allen Bailey. See London Jazz Fest News

The Harlem Gospel Choir tours the world annually. It was the first American gospel choir to perform in Australia, New Zealand, China, Russia, Poland, Lithuania, Latvia, Estonia, Czech Republic, Serbia, Slovenia, Slovakia, Samoa, Thailand, Burma and Morocco. Because of the strong demand for the choir to tour internationally, the choir forms two international touring companies to travel to Europe each winter, and maintains a New York based company year round.

The company comprises 40 of the best singers and musicians from Harlem and the New York Tri-State area. It is not a mass choir, and travels with nine singers and two musicians (keyboards and drums). It has toured the world, logging over two million travel miles. They have performed on major world stages including Lincoln Center, Royal Festival Hall, Carnegie Hall, Yankee Stadium, Arthur Ash Stadium, National Concert Hall (Dublin), the Sydney Opera House, Goungzhou Opera House, and Auditorium Parco della Musica (Rome).

They perform every Sunday at Sony Hall in New York for a gospel brunch, and were previously resident at BB King Blues Club for 17 years. Maintaining strong links with the New York City community they make annual appearances at the Children's Museum of Manhattan and Temple Shaaray Tefila in honor of Martin Luther King Day.

The choir partnered with Operation Smile, donating all of the proceeds from the sale of their charity wristband to the aforementioned organization.
