= Andamento lento =

1988 song by Tullio De Piscopo

Single by Tullio De Piscopo

from the album Bello carico
- B-side: "Tamboo-tamboo da rè"
- Released: February 1988
- Label: EMI
- Songwriters: Tullio De Piscopo; Giosy Capuano; Mario Capuano

Tullio De Piscopo singles chronology
"E fatto 'e sorde!" (1985)	"Andamento lento" (1988)	"E allora e allora" (1989)

Audio
- "Andamento lento" on YouTube

"Andamento lento" (transl. "Slow Pace") is a 1988 song composed by Tullio De Piscopo, Giosy Capuano and Mario Capuano and performed by Tullio De Piscopo. The song premiered at the 38th edition of the Sanremo Music Festival, where it ranked 18th. It eventually turned to be De Piscopo's signature song and his main commercial success, as well as the best selling single of that edition of the Festival.

== Track listing ==
- 7" single
1. "Andamento lento" (Tullio De Piscopo, Giosy Capuano, Mario Capuano)
2. "Tamboo-tamboo da rè" (Tullio De Piscopo, Giosy Capuano, Mario Capuano)

== Charts ==
Chart (1988)	Peak position
Italy (Hit Parade)	2
Italy Airplay (Music & Media)	16
