= Donatella Rettore =

Italian singer-songwriter and actress (born 1955)

Rettore
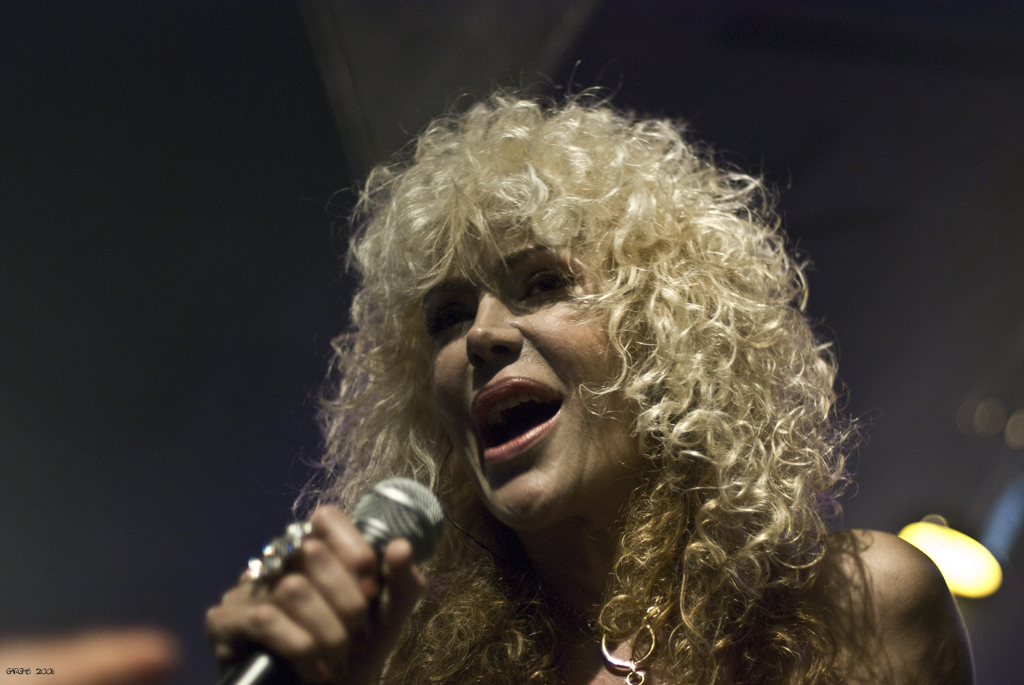
- Rettore in 2008

Background information
- Born: Donatella Rettore; 8 July 1955 (age 70); Castelfranco Veneto, Veneto, Italy
- Genres: Pop; punk; disco; ska
- Occupations: Singer; songwriter; lyricist; actress
- Instrument: Vocals
- Years active: 1973–present
- Labels: Edibi; Produttori Associati; La voce del padrone; Ariston; CGD; Lupis; BMG
- Website: rettore.com

Donatella Rettore (born 8 July 1955), also simply known as Rettore, is an Italian singer and songwriter.

== Career ==
Born in Castelfranco Veneto, Province of Treviso, the daughter of a stage actress and a shopkeeper, Rettore started her singing career at 10 years old, as a member of a local band, I Cobra. After graduating from liceo linguistico, she moved to Rome to pursue her musical career. In 1973, she made her record debut with the singles "Anche se non lo sai" and "Quando tu", and toured as a supporting act for Nuova Compagnia di Canto Popolare and for Lucio Dalla. In 1974, she took part in the 24th edition of the Sanremo Music Festival with "Capelli sciolti", which was included in her debut album Ogni giorno si cantano canzoni d'amore. In the same period, she started collaborating with Claudio Rego, a member of progressive rock band Era dell'Acquario, who became her regular composer and later her husband.

In 1976, Rettore got a major success in German-speaking countries with "Lailolà". In 1977, she returned at the Sanremo Music Festival with "Carmela"; according to the rules of that edition, which mandated a direct challenge between participants, she was eliminated by Albatros. In 1978, she started performing just as Rettore and adopting a more trasgressive look, and one year later she had her domestic breakout with the single "Splendido splendente" and the album Brivido divino. In a few years, she cemented her success with a series of hits, including "Kobra", the Festivalbar winner "Donatella", "Lamette", and Elton John's penned songs "Remember" and "This Time".

Following La ragazza che portava fortuna, a 1980 film project directed by Giancarlo Prete and starring Rettore and George Hilton which was interrupted after a few days of shooting and eventually cancelled, in 1982, she made her acting debut in Umberto Lenzi's comedy film Cicciabomba. In 1983, she released the less successful album Far West, with "Io ho te" serving as its lead single. In 1986, she participated in the Sanremo Music Festival with "Amore Stella"; the following year, she collaborated with Giuni Russo on the summer hit "Adrenalina". Her following projects turned to be unsuccessful, and her career was eventually relaunched by her Sanremo Music Festival 1994 entry "Di notte specialmente". In 2002, she was the subject of a tribute album ClonAzioni – Tutti pazzi per Rettore. After appearing on the reality show La fattoria, in 2005, she released the album Figurine, which was followed by Caduta massi in 2011. In 2024, her duet with Ditonellapiaga, "Chimica", ranked 17th at the 72nd Sanremo Music Festival and was certified gold disc. In 2025, she released the album Antidiva Putiferio.

== Filmography ==
Year	Title	Role	Notes
1982	Cicciabomba	Miris Bigolin	Feature film debut
1989	Paganini	Miss Wells	
1991	Strepitosamente... flop	Raspa	
2015	#Romeo	Mystery woman	Short film

== Discography ==
=== Albums ===
- 1975 Ogni giorno si cantano canzoni d'amore (-)
- 1977 Donatella Rettore (-)
- 1979 Brivido divino (#12)
- 1980 Magnifico delirio (#8)
- 1981 Estasi clamorosa (#8)
- 1982 Kamikaze Rock'n'roll Suicide (#18)
- 1982 Super Rock, le sue più belle canzoni (-)
- 1983 Far West (#22)
- 1985 Danceteria (#20)
- 1988 Rettoressa (#47)
- 1989 Ossigenata (#39)
- 1991 Son Rettore e canto (#42)
- 1994 Incantesimi notturni (#32)
- 1996 Concert (-)
- 2005 Figurine (#45)
- 2008 Stralunata (#2 Dvd Chart)
- 2011 Caduta massi (#26)
- 2012 The Best of the Beast (-)
- 2025 Antidiva putiferio (#25)

=== Singles ===
- 1973 "Quando tu" (-)
- 1974 "Capelli sciolti" (-)
- 1975 "Ti ho preso con me" (-)
- 1976 "Lailolà" (-)
- 1977 "Carmela" (-)
- 1978 "Eroe"(#37)
- 1979 "Splendido splendente" (#6)
- 1980 "Kobra" (#4)
- 1981 "Donatella" (#3)
- 1982 "Lamette" (#8)
- 1982 "This Time" (#8)
- 1983 "Io ho te" (#13)
- 1985 "Femme fatale" (#19)
- 1986 "Amore stella" (#42)
- 1987 "Adrenalina" (with Giuni Russo)
- 1989 "Zan zan zan" (#47)
- 1994 "Di notte specialmente" (#9)
- 2003 "Bastardo" (#29)
- 2005 "Konkiglia" (-)
- 2011 "L'onda del mar" (-)
- 2011 "Callo" (-)
- 2011 "Lamette katana" (7" vinyl)
- 2012 "Natale sottovoce" (-)
- 2013 "Ciao ciao" (-)
- 2013 "Ciao ciao" (Remixes EP) (-)
- 2022 "Chimica" with Ditonellapiaga (#9)
