= Anna discography =

Discography of Italian rapper Anna

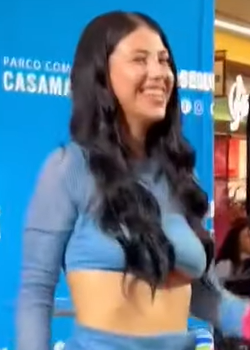
- Anna in July 2024
- Studio albums: 2
- EPs: 1
- Singles: 23

The discography of Italian rapper Anna consists of two studio albums, one EP and twenty-three singles.

== Studio albums ==
List of studio albums, with chart positions and certifications
| Title | Details | Peak chart positions | | Certifications |
| Title | Details | ITA | SWI | Certifications |
|---|---|---|---|---|
| Vera Baddie | Released: 28 June 2024; Label: EMI, Universal Music Italy; Format: CD, LP, digital download | 1 | 7 | FIMI: 6× Platinum |
| Million Dollar Babe | Released: 10 July 2026; Label: EMI, Universal Music Italy; Format: CD, LP, digital download | 1 | 26 | FIMI: Platinum |

== Extended plays ==
List of extended plays, with chart positions and certifications
| Title | Details | Peak chart positions | Certifications |
| Title | Details | ITA | Certifications |
|---|---|---|---|
| Lista 47 | Released: 16 June 2022; Label: Virgin, Universal Music Italy; Format: CD, LP, digital download | 11 | FIMI: Platinum |

== Singles ==
=== As lead artist ===
List of singles as lead artist, with selected chart positions, showing year released and album name
| Title | Year | Peak chart positions | | | | | Certifications | Album |
| Title | Year | ITA | AUT | FRA | GER | SWI | Certifications | Album |
|---|---|---|---|---|---|---|---|---|
| "Bando" | 2020 | 1 | 47 | 92 | 80 | 70 | FIMI: 2× Platinum; SNEP: Platinum | Non-album singles |
| "Bla Bla" (featuring Guè) | 2020 | 45 | — | — | — | — | | Non-album singles |
| "Fast" | 2020 | — | — | — | — | — | | Non-album singles |
| "Squeeze 1" | 2021 | — | — | — | — | — | | Non-album singles |
| "Drippin' in Milano" | 2021 | 24 | — | — | — | — | FIMI: Platinum | Non-album singles |
| "Balaklub – What Up" | 2021 | — | — | — | — | — | | Non-album singles |
| "3 di cuori" (with Lazza) | 2022 | 28 | — | — | — | — | FIMI: Platinum | Lista 47 |
| "Gasolina" | 2022 | 10 | — | — | — | — | FIMI: 2× Platinum | Lista 47 |
| "Energy" | 2023 | — | — | — | — | — | | Non-album singles |
| "Vetri neri" (with Ava and Capo Plaza) | 2023 | 2 | — | — | — | — | FIMI: 6× Platinum | Non-album singles |
| "I Got It" | 2024 | 48 | — | — | — | — | | Vera Baddie |
| "Vieni dalla Baddie (Interlude)" | 2024 | 34 | — | — | — | — | FIMI: Gold | Vera Baddie |
| "BBE" (with Lazza) | 2024 | 4 | — | — | — | — | FIMI: 2× Platinum | Vera Baddie |
| "30°C" | 2024 | 1 | — | — | — | — | FIMI: 3× Platinum | Vera Baddie |
| "Tonight" | 2024 | 36 | — | — | — | — | FIMI: Gold | Vera Baddie |
| "Una tipa come me" | 2025 | 68 | — | — | — | — | FIMI: Gold | Vera Baddie |
| "Désolée" | 2025 | 1 | — | — | — | — | FIMI: Platinum | Non-album single |
| "White Girl Wasted" | 2026 | 4 | — | — | — | — | FIMI: Gold | Million Dollar Babe |
"—" denotes a single that did not chart or was not released.

=== As featured artist ===
List of singles as featured artist, with selected chart positions, showing year released and album name
| Title | Year | Peak chart positions | | Certifications | Album |
| Title | Year | ITA | SWI | Certifications | Album |
|---|---|---|---|---|---|
| "Ma Jolie" (Medy featuring Anna) | 2022 | — | — | FIMI: Gold | Non-album singles |
| "Senza emotions" (Vale Pain and Nko featuring Anna) | 2022 | 64 | — | | Non-album singles |
| "Shawty" (Yung Snapp featuring Anna) | 2022 | — | — | FIMI: Platinum | Hotel Montana |
| "Everyday" (Takagi & Ketra featuring Shiva, Anna and Geolier) | 2023 | 1 | 44 | FIMI: 4× Platinum | Non-album single |
| "Petit fou fou" (Rhove featuring Anna) | 2023 | 6 | — | FIMI: Platinum | Popolari |
| "1 momento" (Astro featuring Anna) | 2024 | 13 | — | FIMI: Gold | Astro |
| "Push It" (Kid Yugi featuring Anna) | 2026 | 2 | — | FIMI: Gold | Anche gli eroi muoiono |
"—" denotes a single that did not chart or was not released.

== Other charted songs ==
List of other charted songs, with selected chart positions, showing year released and album name
| Title | Year | Peak chart positions | Certifications | Album or EP |
| Title | Year | ITA | Certifications | Album or EP |
|---|---|---|---|---|
| "Advice" (featuring MamboLosco) | 2022 | 89 | FIMI: Platinum | Lista 47 |
| "Intro" | 2024 | 70 | | Vera Baddie |
| "Bikini" (featuring Guè) | 2024 | 7 | FIMI: Gold | Vera Baddie |
| "ABC" (featuring Tony Boy and Thasup) | 2024 | 12 | FIMI: Gold | Vera Baddie |
| "I Love It" (featuring Artie 5ive) | 2024 | 3 | FIMI: Platinum | Vera Baddie |
| "Chica italiana" (featuring Sfera Ebbasta) | 2024 | 17 | FIMI: Gold | Vera Baddie |
| "Miss Impossible" | 2024 | 73 | | Vera Baddie |
| "Tt le girlz" (featuring Niky Savage) | 2024 | 2 | FIMI: 2× Platinum | Vera Baddie |
| "Show Me Love" (featuring Capo Plaza) | 2024 | 50 | | Vera Baddie |
| "Mulan" (featuring Tony Effe) | 2024 | 56 | | Vera Baddie |
| "Hello Kitty" (featuring Sillyelly) | 2024 | 20 | FIMI: Platinum | Vera Baddie |
| "Million Dollar Babe" | 2026 | 19 | | Million Dollar Babe |
| "Don't Tell Nobody" | 2026 | 58 | | Million Dollar Babe |
| "Sono io il pass" (with Lazza) | 2026 | 15 | | Million Dollar Babe |
| "Catalano" | 2026 | 74 | | Million Dollar Babe |
| "Cuore in off" | 2026 | 69 | | Million Dollar Babe |
| "Scontrosa" (with G.Mineiro) | 2026 | 22 | | Million Dollar Babe |
| "Safari" (with Astro and Tony Boy) | 2026 | 40 | | Million Dollar Babe |
| "Crystal collo" | 2026 | 75 | | Million Dollar Babe |
| "Benihana" | 2026 | 92 | | Million Dollar Babe |
| "Honey" | 2026 | 48 | | Million Dollar Babe |
"—" denotes a single that did not chart or was not released.

== Other appearances ==
List of other charted songs, with selected chart positions, showing year released and album name
| Title | Year | Peak chart positions | | Certifications | Album |
| Title | Year | ITA | SWI | Certifications | Album |
|---|---|---|---|---|---|
| "Biberon" (Dark Polo Gang featuring DrefGold and Anna) | 2020 | 8 | — | | Dark Boys Club |
| "Hasta la vista remix" (Ghali featuring Anna) | 2020 | — | — | | Non-album single |
| "Twerk RMX" (MamboLosco and Boro featuring Anna) | 2020 | 95 | — | | Caldo |
| "Cookies n' Cream" (Guè featuring Sfera Ebbasta and Anna) | 2023 | 1 | 81 | FIMI: 4× Platinum | Madreperla |
| "Vodka" (MamboLosco featuring Anna) | 2023 | 72 | — | | Facendo faccende |
| "Anelli e collane" (Artie 5ive featuring Anna) | 2023 | 26 | — | FIMI: 2× Platinum | Aspettando la bella vita |
| "Fashion" (Drillionaire featuring Anna, Lazza, Tony Effe and Benny Benassi) | 2023 | 17 | — | FIMI: Platinum | 10 |
| "Le bambine fanno oh" (Sadturs & Kiid featuring Nerissima Serpe, Anna, Papa V and Artie 5ive) | 2023 | 28 | — | | No Regular Music |
| "Ciao bella" (Sfera Ebbasta featuring Anna) | 2023 | 6 | — | FIMI: Platinum | X2VR |
| "Soldi arrotolati" (Capo Plaza featuring Anna) | 2024 | 5 | — | FIMI: Platinum | Ferite |
| "1 momento" (Astro featuring Anna) | 2024 | 13 | — | FIMI: Gold | Astro |
| "Codeine" (Tony Boy featuring Anna) | 2024 | 47 | — | | Going Hard 3 |
| "Diversità" (Sadturs & Kiid featuring Anna and Glocky) | 2025 | 39 | — | | No Regular Music 2 |
| "2 giorni di fila" (Geolier featuring Sfera Ebbasta and Anna) | 2026 | 1 | — | FIMI: Platinum | Tutto è possibile |
| "Obsessed" (Shiva featuring Anna) | 2026 | 3 | — | FIMI: Platinum | Vangelo |
"—" denotes a single that did not chart or was not released.
