= List of number-one hits of 2025 (Italy) =

This is a list of the number-one hits of 2025 on Italy's Singles and Albums Charts, ranked by the Federazione Industria Musicale Italiana (FIMI).

== Chart history ==
List of number-one songs and albums
Week	Song	Artist(s)	Ref.	Album	Artist(s)	Ref.
1	"Il filo rosso"	Alfa		È finita la pace	Marracash	
2	"Ayahuasca"	Simba La Rue featuring Tony Boy		È finita la pace	Marracash	
3	"Oh mamma mia"	Guè and Rose Villain		Tropico del Capricorno	Guè	
4	"DTMF"	Bad Bunny		Mafia Slime 2	Nerissima Serpe, Papa V and Fritu	
5	"DTMF"	Bad Bunny		È finita la pace	Marracash	
6	"DTMF"	Bad Bunny		Il corpo umano Vol. 1	Jovanotti	
7	"Balorda nostalgia"	Olly and Juli		Debí Tirar Más Fotos	Bad Bunny	
8	"Balorda nostalgia"	Olly and Juli		Tutta vita	Olly and Juli	
9	"Balorda nostalgia"	Olly and Juli		Tutta vita	Olly and Juli	
10	"Balorda nostalgia"	Olly and Juli		Tutta vita	Olly and Juli	
11	"Balorda nostalgia"	Olly and Juli		Mayhem	Lady Gaga	
12	"Balorda nostalgia"	Olly and Juli		Radio Vega	Rose Villain	
13	"Balorda nostalgia"	Olly and Juli		Tutta vita	Olly	
14	"Balorda nostalgia"	Olly and Juli		La bellavita	Artie 5ive	
15	"Balorda nostalgia"	Olly and Juli		Volevo essere un duro	Lucio Corsi	
16	"Neon"	Sfera Ebbasta and Shiva		Santana Money Gang	Sfera Ebbasta and Shiva	
17	"Neon"	Sfera Ebbasta and Shiva		Comuni mortali	Achille Lauro	
18	"Neon"	Sfera Ebbasta and Shiva		Santana Money Gang	Sfera Ebbasta and Shiva	
19	"Neon"	Sfera Ebbasta and Shiva		Pink Floyd at Pompeii – MCMLXXII	Pink Floyd	
20	"Piangere a 90"	Blanco		Ranch	Salmo	
21	"Ginevra"	Luchè featuring Geolier		Santana Money Gang	Sfera Ebbasta and Shiva	
22	"Piangere a 90"	Blanco		Ultimo Live Stadi 2024	Ultimo	
23	"A me mi piace"	Alfa and Manu Chao		Non so chi ha creato il mondo ma so che era innamorato (Deluxe)	Alfa	
24	"A me mi piace"	Alfa and Manu Chao		Mediterraneo	Bresh	
25	"Désolée"	Anna		Io non sarei	Alessandra Amoroso	
26	"Désolée"	Anna		Mentre Los Angeles brucia	Fabri Fibra	
27	"Désolée"	Anna		Uforia	Tony Boy	
28	"Désolée"	Anna		Uforia	Tony Boy	
29	"A me mi piace"	Alfa and Manu Chao		Rapper	Niky Savage	
30	"Désolée"	Anna		Ultimo Live Stadi 2024	Ultimo	
31	"Désolée"	Anna		No Regular Music 2	Sadturs and Kiid	
32	"A me mi piace"	Alfa and Manu Chao		Tutta vita	Olly and Juli	
33	"A me mi piace"	Alfa and Manu Chao		Tutta vita	Olly and Juli	
34	"A me mi piace"	Alfa and Manu Chao		Tutta vita	Olly and Juli	
35	"Kriminal"	Baby Gang, El Alfa, Omega and Roberto Ferrante		Tutta vita	Olly and Juli	
36	"Questa domenica"	Olly and Juli		Tutta vita	Olly and Juli	
37	"Questa domenica"	Olly and Juli		Tutta vita	Olly and Juli	
38	"Questa domenica"	Olly and Juli		Tutta vita	Olly and Juli	
39	"Questa domenica"	Olly and Juli		Per soldi e per amore	Ernia	
40	"Questa domenica"	Olly and Juli		Tutta vita (sempre)	Olly and Juli	
41	"Questa domenica"	Olly and Juli		The Life of a Showgirl	Taylor Swift	
42	"Questa domenica"	Olly and Juli		Ma io sono fuoco	Annalisa	
43	"Questa domenica"	Olly and Juli		Antologia della vita e della morte	Irama	
44	"Questa domenica"	Olly and Juli		Sono un grande	Tiziano Ferro	
45	"Questa domenica"	Olly and Juli		Orbit Orbit	Caparezza	
46	"Fotografia"	Geolier		G	Giorgia	
47	"Fotografia"	Geolier		Vasco Live 2025 – The Essentials	Vasco Rossi	
48	"Questa domenica"	Olly and Juli		Una storia importante	Eros Ramazzotti	
49	"Take 6"	Shiva		Funny Games	Noyz Narcos	
50	"All I Want for Christmas Is You"	Mariah Carey		Ultimo Live Stadi 2025	Ultimo	
51	"All I Want for Christmas Is You"	Mariah Carey		Wish You Were Here (50th Anniversary Edition)	Pink Floyd	
52	"Last Christmas"	Wham!		Christmas	Michael Bublé	

== See also ==
- 2025 in music
- List of number-one hits in Italy
