= MamboLosco =

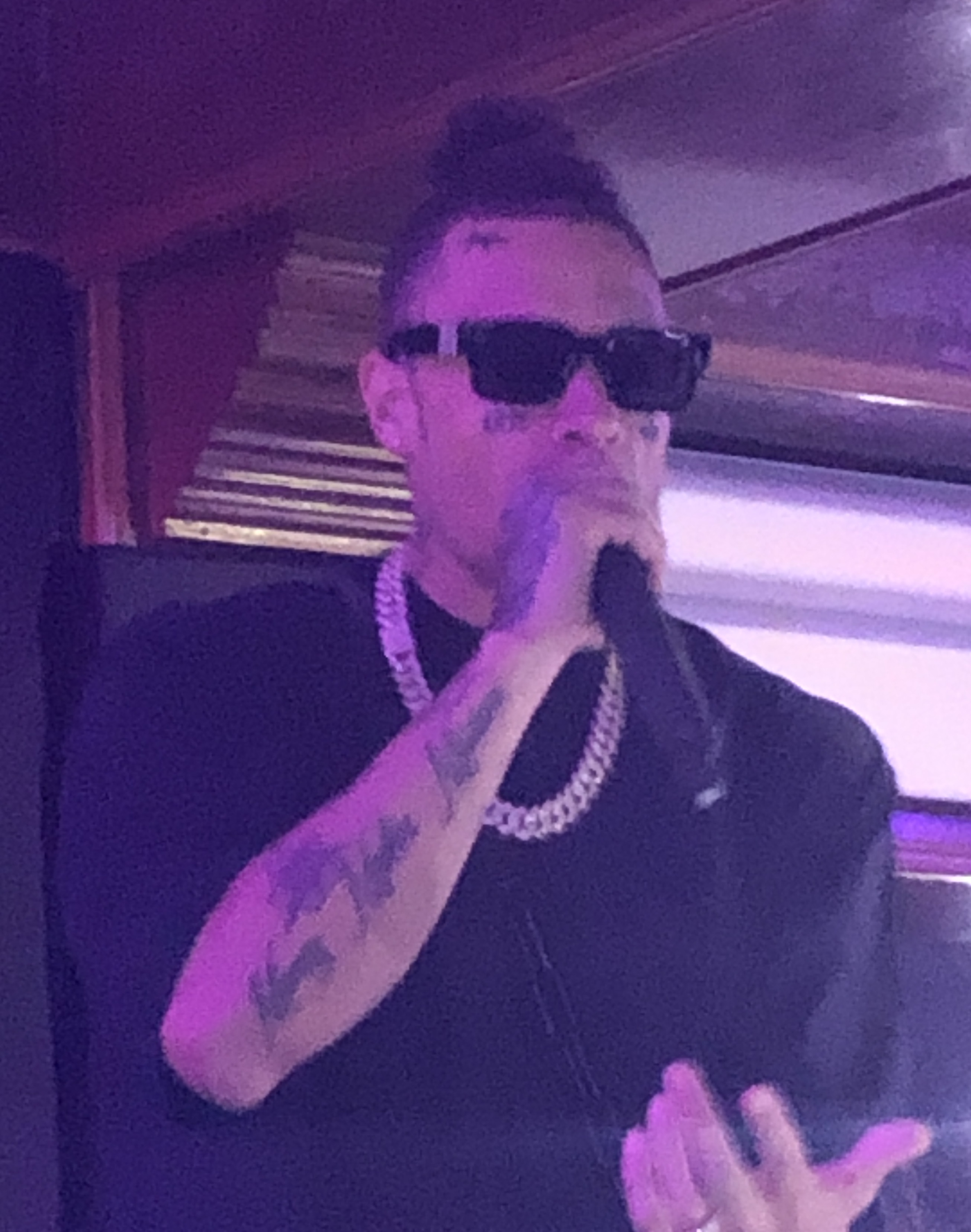
- MamboLosco in 2022

Background information
- Born: William Miller Hickman III; 16 August 1990 (age 36); Vicenza, Italy
- Genres: Hip hop, Reggaeton, Trap
- Occupation: Rapper
- Years active: 2017–present
- Labels: Virgin Records, Universal,

William Miller Hickman III (born 16 August 1990), known professionally as MamboLosco, is an Italian rapper of American descent.

== Early life ==
MamboLosco was born in 1990 to an American military father and an Italian mother from Brindisi. He wrote his first song at the age of thirteen, but began his official musical career began in 2017.

== Career ==
=== 2014-2018: Early years ===
MamboLosco took his first steps towards music in 2009, under the name Lil V, when he began recording his first songs in English. On 10 February 2017, he released his first official song on YouTube, "Mama I Did It Again", which was made in collaboration with the rapper Luscià. On April 7, he released his first single in Italian, titled "Come se fosse normale" featuring Nashley. Subsequently, the two artists together with Edo Fendy, Kerim and the producer Nardi, founded the collective Sugo Gang. On August 4, they released "Me lo sento", followed by "Guarda come flexo" on September 20 which was made with Edo Fendy. The track reached the sixty-third position in the Top Singles chart, becoming the platinum record certified. That same year, he signed on to Dark Polo Gang's label Triplosette Entertainment, and then signed to Virgin Records.

In 2018, he released the single "Guarda come flexo 2" which debuted at number sixteen in the Top Singles chart and received gold record certification. At the end of 2018, he wrote a verse for "Expensive", the only track featured on the Dark Polo Gang album Trap Lovers. The year 2019 began with the release of the single "Bingo", which debuted in the charts at position 35, and featured the Italian version of "Loco", a single by Dutch DJ Yung Felix, which entered the Radiofonica rotation on March 1. On May 3, he released the single "Arcobaleno" accompanied by a music video directed by Tommaso Arnaldi and Francesca Pionati. The song reached the sixty-fourth position in the Top Singles chart and was played on the radio a week after its release.

=== 2019-2020: Arte and Caldo, first successes ===
On 7 June 2019, MamboLosco achieved success with his single "Lento", made in collaboration with Boro and Don Joe. The single, whose remix version features a verse by Lola Índigo, reached number 9 in the charts and was certified double platinum. On September 12, MamboLosco released his first studio album, Arte: the album features guests such as Enzo Dong, Nashley, Tony Effe, Pyrex of the Dark Polo Gang, Boro and Shiva. The productions were entrusted to the Sugo Gang beatmaker Nardi, supported on some tracks by producer Sick Luke, Ava and Mojobeatz. Arte is strongly influenced by American trap music. This was deemed a great strength for the album according to Riccardo Primavera of Rockol, which granted him third place in the Top Singles chart and a certified gold record for the album.

On 24 April 2020, the rapper released the single "Il passo" with Samurai Jay, which preceded the release of his second studio album Caldo, made with Boro. The album was released on July 3. Consisting of eleven tracks, the album contains remixes of "Lendo" and "Twerk". The album also featured artists such as the Dark Polo Gang, Beba, Anna, Rosa Chemical and Geolier. The album, recorded in Barcelona, presents a summer sound attributable to reggaeton and latin music. After the album, MamboLosco participated in the single "Andale" by Niko Pandetta.

=== 2021-present: Facendo Faccende ===
On 5 January 2021, MamboLosco was featured in Malerba's single "No Good". On February 19, he participated with Radical in Rosa Chemical's single "Britney", produced by Bdope and Mothz. He also participated in the remix of the song "Ballas" by Diss Gacha, Sala and Janga ODT. In 2021, he released the single "Demone" as the first single from his next studio album Facendo Faccende, produced by Nardi and Finesse; the track went gold. He later participated in the single "OnlyFans" by Slings which went platinum and "SkuSku" by Pyrex which was the second single from the album. He then released the third single from the album, again produced by Nardi and Finesse, "Pull Up". This track also went gold.

In 2022, the rapper participated in Niko Pandetta's single "123" and then he released a track "BlaBlaBla", another single from Facendo Faccende, which was once again produced by Nardi and Finesse. It was the next consecutive single from the album to be certified gold. The single "Si" was then released with Tony Effe as the fourth single from the album. He later participated in the remix of the song "Thick" by Slings and released the fifth single from his album called "Bandito", again produced by Nardi and Finesse. He is featured in Anna's album in the song "Advice", which was certified gold.

In 2023, MamboLosco returned with the sixth single from the album Facendo Faccende: this single is "Pochi Pochi" with production once again entrusted to Nardi and Finesse. He later appeared on the single by VillaBanks "Il doc 3" together with Tony Effe, Slings and the producers Linch and Andry The Hitmaker. This single was certified platinum. He released another single from Facendo Faccende featuring Rondodasosa: the single is "Karma". On 26 May 2023, he finally released his second studio album Facendo Faccende. The production was entrusted to Nardi and Finesse. In addition to the features already listed in the released singles, there were further collaborations with Niko Pandetta, Anna, VillaBanks, Tony Boy, Slings, and Emis Killa. He then returned in October 2023 as a guest on the single "Cheerleader" by Boro with Andry The Hitmaker, and later participated in the single by Diss Gacha titled "Ballas 2" produced by Sala. In 2024, he released the singles "Guarda come fl3xo" and "Cuori spezzati".

== Discography ==
=== Studio albums ===
- Arte (2019)
- Caldo with Boro Boro (2020)
- Facendo Faccende (2023)
- Yacht Club (2026)
