= Nerissima Serpe =

Italian rapper (born 2000)

- Born: Matteo Di Falco; 6 October 2000 (age 25); Milan, Lombardy, Italy
- Genres: Hip hop
- Occupations: Rapper
- Years active: 2019–present
- Labels: K100; Virgin; EMI

Matteo Di Falco (born 6 October 2000), known professionally as Nerissima Serpe, is an Italian rapper.

== Early life ==
Di Falco grew up in Siziano, in the province of Pavia. He began composing his first lyrics as a child, declaring that he found inspiration partly from the classics of Russian literature, including Dostoevsky, and citing Vasco Rossi, Guè and Marracash as points of reference in the musical field.

== Career ==
=== 2019–2022: Denti da latte and Mafia Slime ===
Di Falco made his debut in the recording industry under the pseudonym of Nerissima Serpe in February 2019, after participating as a guest artist in VillaBanks' Guadalajara.

Serpe's debut studio album Denti da latte, driven by the remix of Barakkino (a duet with VillaBanks), Bianche Air Force and Miami, was presented in July 2020. The album was followed by the project Mafia Slime (2021), recorded together with Papa V and produced by Fritu; although released by Columbia and EMI in January 2021, it entered the FIMI Album chart for the first time four years later.

=== 2023–present: Identità and Mafia Slime 2 ===
In October 2023, Serpe collaborated in Le bambine fanno oh, a song included in the album No Regular Music by SadTurs and Kiid, with which he obtained his first entry into the top 30 of the Top Singoli. A month later, however, his third album of unreleased songs and his second as a soloist, entitled Identità, was presented; it was his first album to debut in the national top 20, thanks to which he was selected as one of the best discoveries of the Italian rap scene by the national edition of Billboard.

In February 2024, Serpe contributed vocals to the single Mattone by Papa V, taken from his album Trap fatta bene and elected one of the best Italian rap songs of the first half of the year by Billboard Italia. He also went on tour during the summer season, taking part for a second time also in the Nameless Festival, and collected a platinum record and three gold ones from the Italian Music Industry Federation for the tracks, equivalent to 250,000 units sold.

Mafia Slime 2, an unreleased project that sees Serpe working again with Papa V and Fritu, has consecrated him commercially; the album, which debuted directly at the top of the national charts and at 31st place on the Schweizer Hitparade, was released in January 2025 and exceeded the threshold of 25,000 equivalent units in a month, thus being certified gold by FIMI. The same, which placed fourteen tracks out of seventeen in the Top Singles simultaneously, also contains the extract Tip tap and the song Wop wop, the latter of which marked his best positioning in the hit parade (6th place). The Mafia Slime Live Tour, aimed at promoting the album, sold out in the seven dates held in the second half of March.

== Discography ==
=== Studio albums ===
- 2020 – Denti da latte
- 2021 – Mafia Slime (with Papa V and Fritu)
- 2023 – Identità
- 2025 – Mafia Slime 2 (with Papa V and Fritu)

=== Singles ===
==== As lead artist ====
- 2020 – Barakkino (solo or feat. VillaBanks)
- 2020 – Bianche Air Force
- 2020 – Miami
- 2021 – Spingere una caterva (with Fri2)
- 2021 – Ghetto gospel (with Digital Astro)
- 2022 – Tutta mia (with Fri2)
- 2022 – Aahora (with Fri2)
- 2022 – Blck Mamba (with Fri2)
- 2022 – Chloé (with Fritu)
- 2023 – Panama (with Axell and Vaporstef)
- 2023 – Pietre roventi (with Low-Red)
- 2023 – Monte Fuji (with Fritu)
- 2023 – Metropolitana (with Artie 5ive and Mojobeatz)
- 2023 – Ragazzini 2000 (with Kuremino)
- 2023 – Mamy freestyle
- 2023 – Mare d'inverno (feat. Ariete & VillaBanks)
- 2024 – Mattone (with Papa V and Kuremino feat. Fritu)
- 2024 – Entrano escono (with Rasty Kilo and Papa V)
- 2024 – Tip tap (with Papa V and Fritu)
- 2025 – A lei (with Papa V and Fritu)

==== As featured artist ====
- 2019 – Guadalajara (VillaBanks feat. Nerissima Serpe)
- 2022 – Apparecchiato (Papa V feat. Nerissima Serpe)
- 2023 – Responsabile (Papa V and Fritu feat. Nerissima Serpe)
- 2024 – Biblioteca (Low-Red feat. Nerissima Serpe)
- 2024 – Players Club '24 (Night Skinny, Low-Red and Kid Yugi feat. Tony Boy, Papa V, Nerissima Serpe, Artie 5ive & Astro)
- 2025 – Stupidi (Fabri Fibra feat. Papa V and Nerissima Serpe)

=== Collaborations ===
- 2021 – Piccolo principe (Don Joe feat. Massimo Pericolo and Nerissima Serpe)
- 2022 – Cucaracha (Low-Red feat. Nerissima Serpe and Papa V)
- 2022 – Monopolio (TY1 feat. Kid Yugi and Nerissima Serpe)
- 2023 – Highway (Diss Gacha feat. Nerissima Serpe and Tony Boy)
- 2023 – Non è facile (Tony Boy feat. Digital Astro and Nerissima Serpe)
- 2023 – Le bambine fanno oh (Sadturs & Kiid feat. Nerissima Serpe, Anna, Papa V and Artie 5ive)
- 2024 – Oceano (Ele A feat. Nerissima Serpe)
- 2024 – Dal confine (Sadturs & Kiid feat. Rhove and Nerissima Serpe)
- 2024 – Tessera sanitaria (Night Skinny feat. Nerissima Serpe and Papa V)
- 2024 – Walzer (Night Skinny feat. Papa V, Nerissima Serpe and Fabri Fibra)
- 2024 – Così non va bene (Faneto feat. Nerissima Serpe)
- 2024 – Frigo vuoto (Glocky feat. Nerissima Serpe)
- 2025 – Cucchiaino (Jake La Furia feat. Nerissima Serpe)
- 2025 – Cinte di pelle (Rrari dal Tacco feat. Nerissima Serpe)
- 2025 – Patto col diavolo (Cancun feat. Nerissima Serpe and Papa V)
- 2025 – Ilary (Luchè feat. Guè and Nerissima Serpe)
