= Vera Baddie =

Studio album by Anna
- Released: 28 June 2024
- Genres: Hip hop; pop; trap
- Length: 45:16
- Labels: EMI; Universal
- Producers: Adam11; Andry the Hitmaker; Arty; Ava; Cripo; Dylan Hyde; EninraK; Kiid; Miles; Noxious; Sadturs; Thugstage; Toto Beats; Westen Weiss

Anna chronology
Lista 47 (2022)	Vera Baddie (2024)	Million Dollar Babe (2026)

Singles from Vera Baddie
- 1. "I Got It" Released: 19 January 2024; 2. "Vieni dalla baddie" Released: 18 April 2024; 3. "BBE" Released: 10 May 2024; 4. "30°C" Released: 31 May 2024; 5. "Tonight" Released: 20 September 2024; 6. "Una tipa come me" Released: 17 January 2025

Vera Baddie (transl. Real Baddie) is the debut studio album by Italian rapper Anna, released on 28 June 2024 through EMI and Universal.

The album includes guest appearances by Guè, Tony Boy, Thasup, Artie 5ive, Lazza, Sfera Ebbasta, Niky Savage, Capo Plaza, Tony Effe, and Sillyelly.

It peaked at number one on the Italian Albums Chart and was certified six-times platinum, becoming the third best-selling album of 2024 in Italy.

== Track listing ==
Vera Baddie track listing
No.	Title	Lyrics	Music	Producer(s)	Length
1.	"Intro"	Anna Pepe	Francesco Avallone	Ava	1:54
2.	"Bikini" (featuring Guè)	Pepe; Cosimo Fini	Avallone; Nicolò Pucciarmati	Ava; Miles	1:59
3.	"ABC" (featuring Tony Boy and thasup)	Pepe; Antonio Hueber; Davide Mattei	Francesco Turolla; Lorenzo Bassotti; Pucciarmati	Miles; Sadturs; Kiid	3:17
4.	"Tonight"	Pepe	Turolla; Pucciamarti	Miles; Sadturs	2:55
5.	"I Love It" (featuring Artie 5ive)	Pepe; Ivan Arturo Barioli	Turolla; Bassotti; Pucciarmati; Tim Gomringer; Kevin Gomringer	Sadturs; Kiid	3:12
6.	"BBE" (featuring Lazza)	Pepe; Jacopo Lazzarini; Dylan Hyde	Hyde; Turolla; Pucciarmati; Bassotti	Miles; Sadturs; Kiid; Dylan Hyde	3:18
7.	"Chica italiana" (featuring Sfera Ebbasta)	Pepe; Gionata Boschetti	Turolla; Pucciarmati; Arty; Yannick Mahouto	Arty; Miles; Sadturs; Noxious	2:46
8.	"30°C"	Pepe	Pucciarmati; Arty	Arty; Miles; Toto Beats	2:22
9.	"Vieni dalla baddie" (interlude)	Pepe	Andrea Moroni	Andry the Hitmaker	1:33
10.	"Miss Impossible"	Pepe	Vladislav Polyakov	Thugstage	2:47
11.	"Tt le girlz" (featuring Niky Savage)	Pepe; Nicholas Alfieri	Pucciarmati; Nicola Lazzarin	Miles; Cripo	2:24
12.	"Una tipa come me"	Pepe	Westen Weiss	Westen Weiss	2:52
13.	"Show Me Love" (featuring Capo Plaza)	Pepe; Luca D'Orso	Pucciarmati; Arty; Turolla	Arty; Miles; Sadturs	2:09
14.	"Mulan" (featuring Tony Effe)	Pepe; Nicolò Rapisarda	Moroni	Andry the Hitmaker	2:25
15.	"Why U Mad"	Pepe	Pucciarmati; Turolla; Bassotti	Miles; Sadturs; Kiid	2:05
16.	"Hello Kitty" (featuring Sillyelly)	Pepe; Elen Lanza	Pucciarmati; Carmine Corsini	EnimraK	2:29
17.	"Amore da piazza"	Pepe	Arty	Arty	2:28
18.	"I Got It"	Pepe	Turolla; Bassotti; Davide Maddalena; Andrea Usai	Sadturs; Kiid; Adam11	2:22
Total length:					45:16

== Charts ==
=== Weekly charts ===
Weekly chart performance for Vera Baddie
Chart (2024)	Peak position
Italian Albums (FIMI)	1

=== Year-end charts ===
Year-end chart performance for Vera Baddie
Chart (2024)	Position
Italian Albums (FIMI)	3

== Certifications ==
Certifications for Vera Baddie
Region	Certification	Certified units/sales
Italy (FIMI)	6× Platinum	300,000^{‡}
^{‡} Sales+streaming figures based on certification alone.

== Year-end lists ==
Selected year-end rankings of Vera Baddie
Publication	List	Rank	Ref.
Rolling Stone	The 25 Best Italian Albums of 2024	6	
