= Syrup (disambiguation) =

Syrup is a thick, viscous liquid, containing a large amount of dissolved sugars, but showing little tendency to deposit crystals.

Syrup may also refer to:

- Syrup (drug), slang for Purple drank, a recreational drug
- Syrup (novel), a satirical novel by Max Barry
  - Syrup (film), a film based on the novel by Barry
- Cough medicine, also known as cough syrup
- Sirup (film), a Danish 1990 drama film
- "Syrup" (song), a 2023 song by Shiva
- "Syrup", a 2009 song by Moka Only from the album Lowdown Suite 2… The Box

== People with the surname ==
- Friedrich Syrup (1881–1945), German jurist and politician

== Fictional characters ==
- Captain Syrup, a character from the Wario Land series

== See also ==
- List of syrups
