= Lista 47 =

EP by Anna
- Released: 17 June 2022
- Genre: Hip-hop; trap
- Length: 18:43
- Language: Italian
- Label: Virgin
- Producer: Andry the Hitmaker; Drillionaire; Finesse; Lazza; Young Miles; NKO

Anna chronology
Lista 47 (2022)	Vera Baddie (2024)

Singles from Lista 47
- 1. "3 di cuori" Released: 29 April 2022; 2. "Gasolina" Released: 3 June 2022

Lista 47 is the debut extended play by Italian rapper Anna. It was released on 17 June 2022 by Virgin Records and peaked at number 11 on the Italian Albums Chart.

The EP includes the successful singles "3 di cuori", featuring Lazza, and "Gasolina", which pays homage to the song "Las divinas" by Brenda Asnicar from the Argentine series Patito Feo.

== Track listing ==
Lista 47 track listing
No.	Title	Lyrics	Music	Producer(s)	Length
1.	"Solo andata"	Anna Pepe	Niccolò Pucciarmati; Amritvir Singh	Miles; Finesse	2:28
2.	"Gasolina"	Pepe	Pucciarmati; Diego Vincenzo Vettraino; Carlos Zulisber Nilson; Manuel José Mario Schajris	Miles; Drillionaire	2:26
3.	"Advice" (featuring MamboLosco)	Pepe; William Miller Hickman III	Andrea Moroni	Andry the Hitmaker	3:04
4.	"Babe" (featuring Rondodasosa)	Pepe; Mattia Barbieri	Pucciarmati; Nicolas Di Benedetto	Miles; NKO	3:03
5.	"Loca"	Pepe	Pucciarmati	Miles	3:06
6.	"Rufa" (featuring Slings)	Pepe; Prince Boateng Osei; Ibrahima Sow	Pucciarmati	Miles	1:43
7.	"3 di cuori" (featuring Lazza)	Pepe; Jacopo Lazzarini; Cosimo Fini; Fabio Rizzo	Moroni; Pucciarmati; Stefano Tognini	Lazza; Andry the Hitmaker; Miles	2:58

== Charts ==
=== Weekly charts ===
Weekly chart performance for Lista 47
Chart (2022)	Peak position
Italian Albums (FIMI)	11

=== Year-end charts ===
Year-end chart performance for Lista 47
Chart (2022)	Position
Italian Albums (FIMI)	76

== Certifications ==
Certifications for Lista 47
Region	Certification	Certified units/sales
Italy (FIMI)	Platinum	50,000^{‡}
^{‡} Sales+streaming figures based on certification alone.
