= Rondodasosa =

Italian rapper

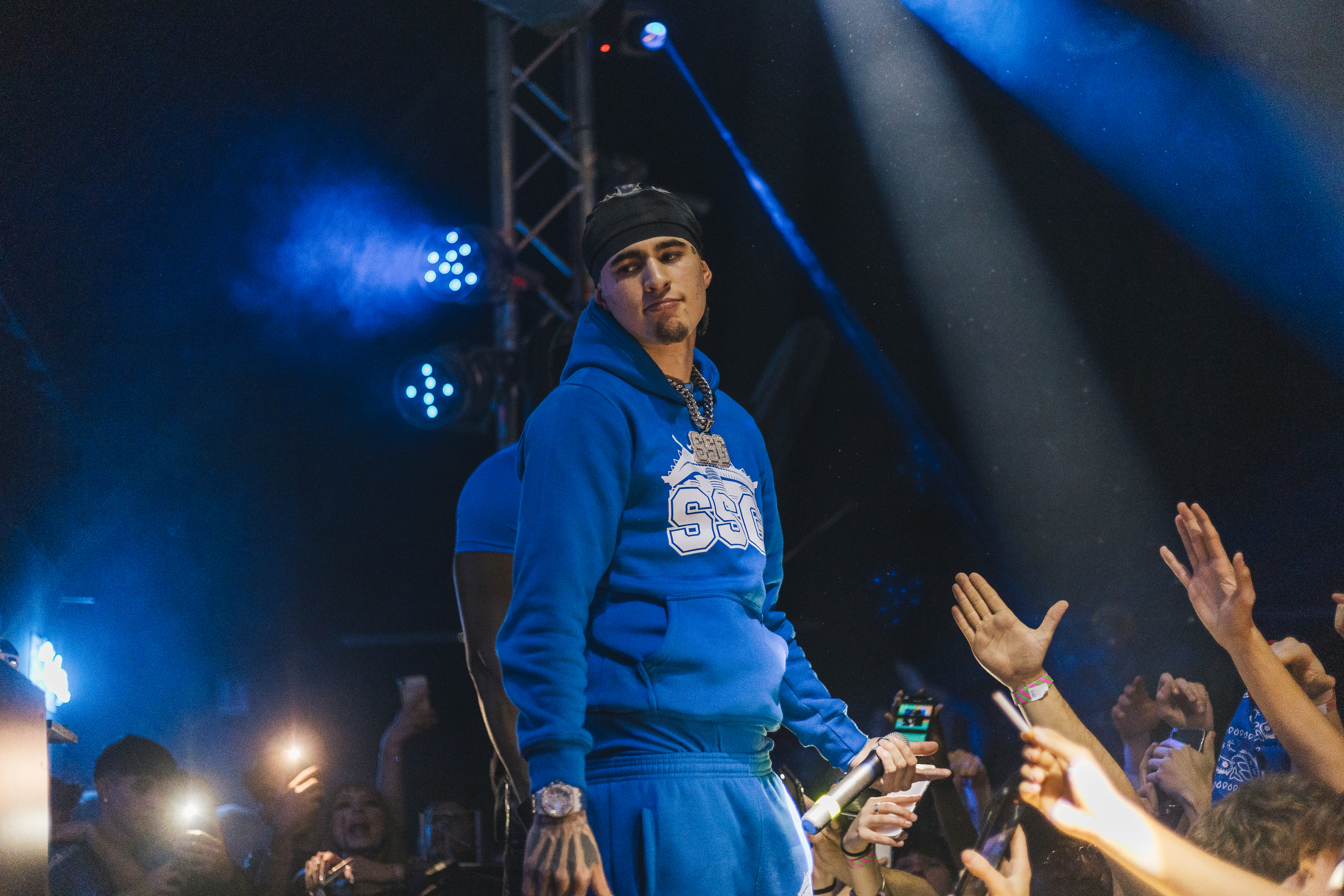
- Rondo live, December 2023

Background information
- Also known as: Rondo
- Born: Mattia Barbieri; 29 April 2002 (age 24); San Siro, Milan, Italy
- Genres: Drill; trap
- Occupations: Rapper; songwriter; singer
- Years active: 2020–present
- Label: Warner Music Italy
- Member of: SSG

Mattia Barbieri (born 29 April 2002), known professionally as Rondodasosa, is an Italian rapper, singer, and songwriter. Born in San Siro, Milan, he began his musical career in 2020, releasing his debut EP Giovane Rondo the same year.

== Early life ==
Mattia Barbieri was born on 29 April 2002, in the San Siro district of Milan, Italy. He grew up without a father. As he reported in an interview for GRM Daily. In order to prevent himself from being sentenced to juvenile prison, he got a job at McDonalds in 2020. He later on started work as a waiter at a restaurant for €600 a month.

== Career ==
=== 2020-2021: Early years, Giovane Rondo and International Success ===
Rondodasosa released his first single, "Free Samy", in January 2020, quickly gaining half a million views on YouTube. This was followed by the single "Leggenda".

He began to gain significant notoriety in May 2020 with the remix of "Exposing Me", a drill track from Chicago belonging to King Von and Memo600; Rondodasosa titled the track "Face to Face". The track is still his most successful single on YouTube. The positive trend was then confirmed with his appearance on the song of his friend Vale Pain, titled "Louboutin", in June. On 19 October 2020, he released "Slatt" in collaboration with Capo Plaza, which achieved great success, reaching tenth place in the charts. The track also anticipated the release of his first EP: Giovane Rondo. In addition to Capo Plaza, rappers such as Vale Pain, Abby 6ix and Shiva also collaborated with him. On 26 February 2021, he released the single "Movie", featuring British rapper Central Cee. On 14 June 2021, Giovane Rondo went gold, becoming the first digital-only EP to achieve a gold record.

In May 2021, British rappers Russ Millions and Tion Wayne released an Italian remix of their international hit "Body" in collaboration with Capo Plaza and Rondodasosa. The remix achieved great success in Italy, in large part because of TikTok.

On 25 June 2021, he released the single "Solo/Alone", produced by Nko, as well as the track "Shawty", in collaboration with Sacky, which went viral on TikTok. At the end of the year, he collaborated with the British music producer Fumez the Engineer for the single "Plugged In".

=== 2022-2023: Trenches Baby and Motivation 4 The Streetz with Artie 5ive ===
Rondodasosa appeared on Central Cee's mixtape 23, on the track "Eurovision", which also features Italian rapper Baby Gang, British rapper A2Anti, Spanish rappers Morad and Beny Jr, and French rappers Ashe 22 and Freeze Corleone. In 2022, he released the single "Chinga" with Simba La Rue, followed by a collaboration with the Trenches Baby label for the song "Birkin". He later released the single "Sturdy" followed by the single "Autostop".

In 2022, Rondodasosa released his first studio album, Trenches Baby, featuring guest appearances by Thasup, Lazza, Vale Pain, Capo Plaza, Russ Millions, Gazo, Rose Villain, and Ghali.

In 2023, Rondo added two singles to the album, "New York" and "Ready 4 War" with Artie 5ive, which achieved moderate success. Later in 2023, he took part in singles by rappers Russ Millions, Noizy, MamboLosco and ElGrandeToto. He released three singles in a row: "We On Em" with NLE Choppa, "Chiara" and "SSG".

Towards the end of 2023, he released the singles "Red&Blue" with Artie 5ive and '"Business Guru", ahead of the release of their first collaborative album Motivation 4 The Streetz. The project has achieved a success of 142 million total streams and features collaborations with artists such as Capo Plaza, Rose Villain, Achille Lauro, Dessy, Tony Effe, Bello Figo and Rasty Kilo.

=== 2024: BLUE TAPE ===
In 2024, Rondodasosa returned with the single "Face to Face 2", followed by "My Life", "Pack a Punch Freestyle", "Town" and "Adderall". In April 2024, the rapper released his first mixtape, BLUE TAPE. He later released two singles for the show On the Radar, in which he was the first Italian to participate. That same month, Rondodasosa appeared on Adam22's podcast No Jumper, where he discussed his upbringing, his rap career and music style, his future plans, and many other details about himself and his life.

In August 2024, he returned to the limelight with the unreleased song "Mandante", which addresses the accusations that have been made in the legal case of the rapper Shiva.

=== 2025: Collaborations and MATTIA ===
On 11 July 2025, Rondodasosa released the single track "LIVIN" in a collaboration with the Jamaican rapper Byron Messia. The track is considered to be not just a hit record but a "cultural exchange"; the track combines "Rondo’s hard-hitting Italian flow with Byron Messia’s melodic Caribbean cadence", allowing for the song to blend raw drill energy with island heat.

On 26 September 2025, the rapper released his third studio album, Mattia. He preceded the album by releasing the singles "Welcome to Mylan" on August 26, and "Al Pacino" on September 9. The album consists of fifteen tracks, including three collaborations with Guè, Ayo Ally, and Heartman. On October 10, the album concluded with the release of a bonus track "Occhi Tristi".

On 12 December 2025, he released a new single "Dashcam" in collaboration with British rapper Meekz.

=== 2026: MATTIA 7 and La Familia ===
On 7 February 2026, he released the deluxe edition of MATTIA, preceded by the single "Zack & Cody", released on January 19. The number 7, described by the artist as "lucky", is the underlying theme of this expansion, which further explores the themes of success, challenges, and Rondo's life experiences. Rondo announced in an interview that MATTIA 7 will be his last Italian album. He plans on moving to America and begin rapping in English in the future.

After the release of MATTIA 7, Rondo announced on April 10 in the music video for "Face To Face 3" (feat. LINDA), the upcoming September release of La Familia, the album he himself described as an "international album" due to its numerous international guest appearances. He subsequently released singles from the album: "San Siro" (feat. Young Adz) on June 19 and "Rihanna" (feat. Real Boston Richey) on July 10.

== Controversies and legal issues ==
In 2020, Mattia was reported to police for jumping on the hood of a police cruiser in San Siro.

On 10 August 2021, Barbieri and five other boys including the rapper Baby Gang were banned (DASPO) from all the clubs in Milan following a brawl that occurred on July 12 in front of a nightclub. The order also prevented Barbieri from entering bars, discos and public places in the city. Following this event, Barbieri moved to London.

On 29 December 2022, Barbieri was stopped driving a Mercedes in Milan. Since he was found without a license (which he never obtained to being with) and without documents, he was taken to the police station. He was subsequently fined for resisting a public official.

On 4 February 2024, Barbieri was stopped in Milan while driving a black Dodge with no front license plate and a rear license plate that did not match the vehicle's chassis. He was found with a blank pistol, a replica of a Glock 17 without a red cap, four blank rounds, and 6 grams of marijuana. He was subsequently charged with illegal possession of a firearm, use of a forged document, and possession of a narcotic substance.

== Discography ==
=== Studio albums ===
List of albums, with selected details
| Title | Details | Peak chart positions |
| Title | Details | ITA |
|---|---|---|
| Trenches Baby | Released: 4 November 2022; Label: Real Music, Warner Music Italy | 1 |
| Motivation 4 the Streetz (with Artie 5ive) | Released: 8 December 2023; Label: Real Music, Warner Music Italy | 4 |
| BLUE TAPE | Released: 5 April 2024; Label: Trenches, Warner Music Italy | 6 |
| MATTIA | Released: 26 September 2025; Label: Trenches, Warner Music Italy | 3 |

=== EPs ===
List of EPs, with selected details
| Title | Details | Peak chart positions | Certifications |
| Title | Details | ITA | Certifications |
|---|---|---|---|
| Giovane Rondo | Released: 16 October 2020; Label: Warner Music Italy | 6 | FIMI: Gold |

=== Charted singles ===
==== As lead artist ====
List of charted singles as lead artist
| Title | Year | Peak chart positions | Certifications | Album |
| Title | Year | ITA | Certifications | Album |
|---|---|---|---|---|
| "Louboutin" (with Vale Pain) | 2020 | 22 | FIMI: Platinum | Non-album singles |
| "Slime" (with Lazza) | 2020 | 49 | FIMI: Platinum | Non-album singles |
| "Baby" | 2020 | 97 | | Giovane Rondo |
| "Youngshit" (featuring Shiva) | 2020 | 41 | | Giovane Rondo |
| "Slatt" (featuring Capo Plaza) | 2020 | 10 | FIMI: 2× Platinum | Giovane Rondo |
| "Trap" | 2020 | 92 | | Giovane Rondo |
| "Movie" (with NKO featuring Central Cee) | 2021 | 26 | FIMI: Gold | Non-album singles |
| "Dubai" (with NKO) | 2021 | 27 | FIMI: Gold | Non-album singles |
| "Shawty" (with Sacky) | 2021 | 36 | FIMI: Gold | Non-album singles |
| "Chinga" (with NKO featuring Simba La Rue) | 2021 | 49 | | Non-album singles |
| "Sturdy" (with NKO) | 2022 | 46 | | Trenches Baby |
| "Autostop" | 2022 | 52 | | Trenches Baby |
| "Fashion Nova" | 2022 | 65 | | Trenches Baby |
| "Blue Cheese" (with NKO featuring Lazza) | 2022 | 11 | | Trenches Baby |
| "Outside" (with Miles) | 2022 | 57 | | Trenches Baby |
| "Yamaha" (with NKO) | 2022 | 91 | | Trenches Baby |
| "Trenches Baby" (with NKO) | 2022 | 71 | | Trenches Baby |
| "Tonight" (with NKO featuring Vale Pain) | 2022 | 59 | | Trenches Baby |
| "Drillmoon" (with NKO featuring Tha Supreme) | 2022 | 35 | | Trenches Baby |
| "Sin Cara" (with NKO, Miles, and Low Kidd) | 2022 | 39 | | Trenches Baby |
| "Cell" (featuring Rose Villain and Ghali) | 2022 | 89 | | Trenches Baby |
| "Playa" (with Miles) | 2022 | 73 | | Trenches Baby |
| "No Luv" (with NKO featuring Capo Plaza) | 2022 | 53 | | Trenches Baby |
| "Killy Demon" (with NKO featuring Gazo and Russ Millions) | 2022 | 95 | | Trenches Baby |
| "Tokyo" (with NKO) | 2022 | 24 | | Trenches Baby |
| "SSG" | 2023 | 73 | | Non-album singles |
| "Face to Face 2" | 2024 | 51 | | Non-album singles |
| "Welcome to Mylan" | 2025 | 80 | | Non-album singles |

==== As featured artist ====
List of charted singles as featured artist
| Title | Year | Peak chart positions | Album | Certifications |
| Title | Year | ITA | Album | Certifications |
|---|---|---|---|---|
| "Seven 7oo" (RM4E featuring Rondodasosa, Sacky, Vale Pain, Neima Ezza, Keta and Killmoney) | 2021 | 12 | Non-album singles | FIMI: Platinum |
| "Boy" (Baby Gang and Bobo featuring Rondodasosa) | 2021 | 76 | Non-album singles | |
| "Eurovision" (Central Cee featuring Rondodasosa, Baby Gang, A2 Anti, Morad, Beny Jr, Ashe 22 and Freeze Corleone) | 2022 | 57 | 23 | |
| "Birkin" (Trenches Baby featuring Rondodasosa) | 2022 | 42 | Non-album singles | |
| "Rap" (Seven 7oo featuring Neima Ezza, Rondodasosa and Sacky) | 2022 | 82 | Non-album singles | |
| "LEI" (Neima Ezza featuring Rondodasosa) | 2022 | 60 | Giù | FIMI: Gold |
| "C!ao" (Tha Supreme featuring Rondodasosa | 2022 | 7 | Carattere speciale | |
