= Samurai Jay =

Italian rapper and singer-songwriter (born 1998)

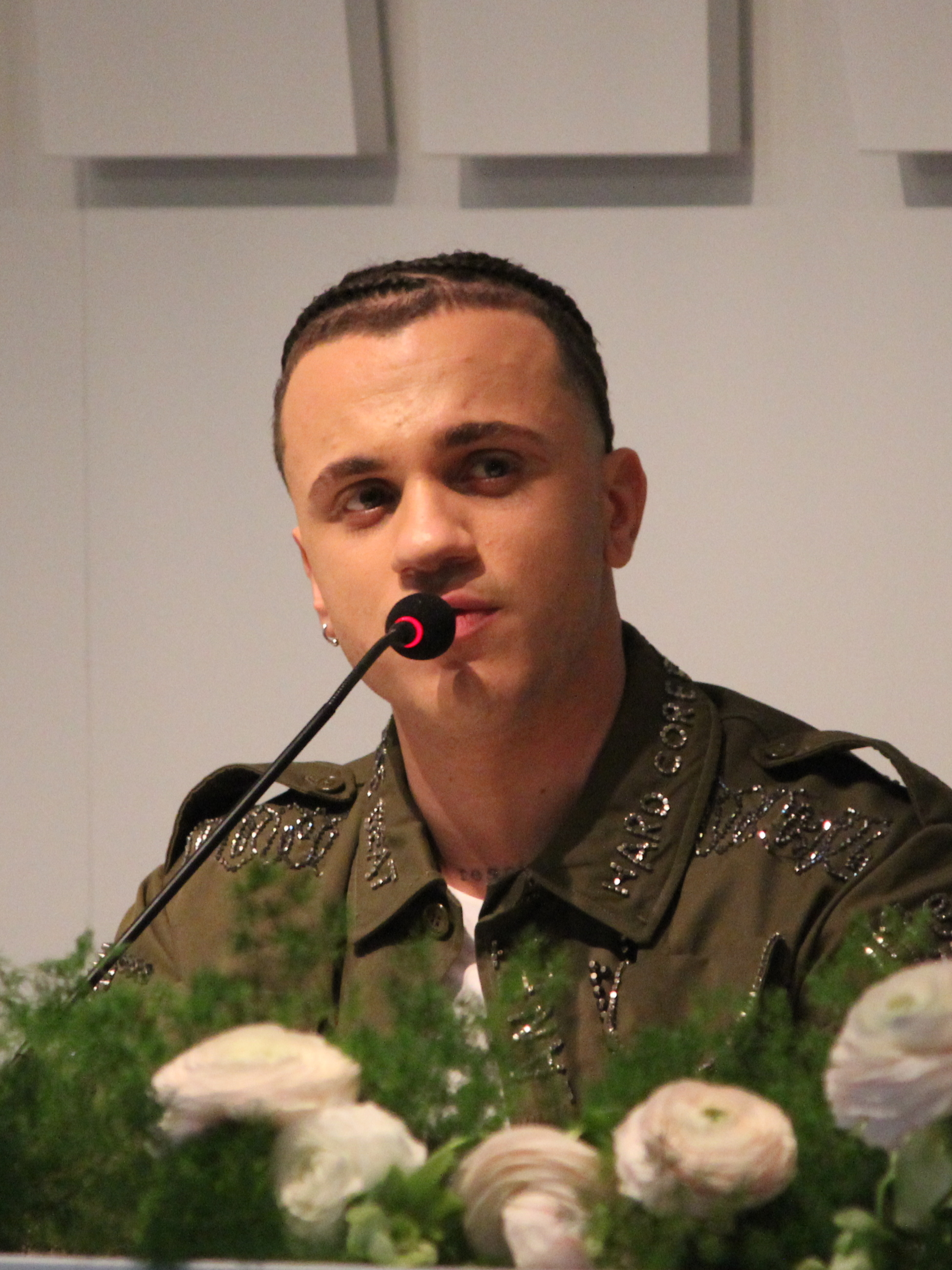
- Samurai Jay in February 2026

Background information
- Born: Gennaro Amatore; 1 October 1998 (age 28); Mugnano di Napoli, Campania, Italy
- Genre: Reggaeton
- Occupations: Rapper; singer-songwriter
- Instrument: Vocals
- Years active: 2018–present
- Labels: Island; Universal; Thaurus

Gennaro Amatore (born 1 October 1998), known professionally as Samurai Jay, is an Italian rapper and singer-songwriter.

== Life and career ==
Born in 1998 in Mugnano di Napoli, Naples, he was introduced to rap thanks to artists like Co'Sang, Linkin Park, and Jay-Z. He began to gain recognition in the urban scene with his first EP, Promesse, released in 2018.

After releasing the singles Sorry Mama, Audemars featuring MV Killa and Yung Snapp, and "Fai il serio", on 31 May 2019, he took part in the remix of Livio Cori's song "A casa mia". It will be performed worldwide at the San Paolo Stadium in Naples during the XXX Universiade.

That same year, he collaborated with Boro in "Male" and released the single "Gang", signed to the Thaurus label. This single featured Italian producers M4W and Dat Boi Dee, as well as Italian rapper Geolier. The single was the artist's first to enter the FIMI singles chart, and was also certified gold.

On 6 September 2019 he participated with Jake La Furia in the song High by Junior Cally, while on 4 November it was the turn of the single "Panico" by Peppe Soks and Dani.

In 2020, he collaborated with several artists, including Elettra Lamborghini and MamboLosco on the remix of "Te quemas" and the Dark Polo Gang on "No Stupid". He also released the singles "Vamos pa la banca" with Lele Blade, Geolier, and Dat Boi Dee, "Cringe" with Beba, "Tasche piene" with Shiva, "Kriminal" by Shablo with Gué Pequeno and Gemitaiz and "Il passo" with MamboLosco and Nardi. He also collaborated with Gigi D'Alessio on the single "Buongiorno" and the remix of "Fotomodelle un po' povere".

His first studio album, Lacrime, was released on 23 October 2020, which includes collaborations with Gué Pequeno, Rkomi, Geolier and Boro. In the same year he participated in Lavazza's "Nuove strade" project, created to celebrate the 50th anniversary of the Qualità Rossa blend, releasing the single of the same name on 23 September with Ernia, Rkomi, Gaia, Madame and Andry the Hitmaker.

He was a guest on the second night of the Sanremo Music Festival 2021, where he performed "Guagliune" with Gigi D'Alessio, Ivan Granatino, Enzo Dong and Lele Blade, releasing it on 26 February. The song will also be performed on 9 September of the same year during the first night of the SEAT Music Awards 2021.

On 2 April 2021 he participated with Carl Brave in the song "Cielo nero" by Random, on 7 May with Jake La Furia in "Novanta" by TY1, on 11 June with Boro in the song "Dinero" by Baby K, on the 26th of the same month in "Sirena" by Mace, Ernia and Darrn, while on 16 July it was the turn of "Superstar" by Fred De Palma.

On 3 June 2021 he participated in the single "Hermano" by Cancun, while on 15 July, he released the single "Bye Bye", certified gold by FIMI. This was followed by the singles "Nessuno" and "Non mi va", released the following year on May 18 and 23 June respectively. The three songs preceded the EP Respira, created with producer Dani and released on 1 July 2022. On 3 June of the same year, he participated in the seventh edition of the Nameless Festival in Annone di Brianza, in the province of Lecco.

On 24 February 2023, she released the single "Colpa mia (Gelosa)", followed by "Fammi capire" on 18 April and "Ci pensi mai?" on 20 October. On 27 July of the same year, she participated in the remix of Pepe's "Pop corn e patatine"; while on 14 June of the following year, she released the single "Alba", a collaboration with Don Pero.

On 12 June 2025 he released the single "Halo", a collaboration with Vito Salamanca. The opening verse, "It's all wrong / Everything's going backwards...", went viral on social media, earning it the title of the summer hit of 2025.

On 30 November 2025, Samurai Jay was announced among the participants of the Sanremo Music Festival 2026. He competed with the song "Ossessione". He is a singing coach in the 26th edition of Amici di Maria De Filippi (Amici 26).

== Discography ==
=== Studio albums ===
List of studio albums, with chart positions and certifications
Title	Album details	Peak chart positions	Certifications
Title	Album details	ITA	Certifications
Lacrime	Released: 23 October 2020; Label: Island, Universal; Format: CD, LP, digital download, streaming	8	
Amatore (with Vito Salamanca)	Released: 21 May 2026; Label: Island, Universal; Format: CD, LP, digital download, streaming	3	FIMI: Gold

=== Extended plays ===
List of EPs
Title	EP details
Promesse	Released: 24 September 2018; Label: self-produced; Formati: CD, digital download, streaming
Respira (with Dani)	Released: 30 June 2022; Label: Island, Universal; Format: CD, digital download, streaming

=== Singles ===
==== As lead artist ====
List of singles, with chart positions and album name
Title	Year	Peak chart positions		Certifications	Album or EP
Title	Year	ITA	SWI	Certifications	Album or EP
"Calmo"	2018	—	—		Non-album singles
"Problemi"	2018	—	—		Non-album singles
"Sorry Mama"	2019	—	—		Non-album singles
"Fai il serio"	2019	—	—		Non-album singles
"Male" (featuring Boro)	2019	—	—		Non-album singles
"Gang" (with M4W and Dat Boi Dee featuring Geolier)	2019	45	—	FIMI: Gold	Non-album singles
"Tasche piene" (featuring Shiva)	2020	—	—		Non-album singles
"Cringe" (with Beba)	2020	—	—		Non-album singles
"Nuove strade" (with Ernia, Rkomi, Madame, Gaia and Andry The Hitmaker)	2020	51	—		Non-album singles
"Bye Bye" (with Dani)	2021	—	—	FIMI: Gold	Respira
"Nessuno" (with Dani)	2022	—	—		Respira
"Non mi va" (with Dani)	2022	—	—		Respira
"Colpa mia (Gelosa)" (with Dani)	2023	—	—		Non-album singles
"Fammi capire" (with Dani)	2023	—	—		Non-album singles
"Pop corn e patatine RMX" (with Dani)	2023	—	—		Non-album singles
"Ci pensi mai?" (with Dani)	2023	—	—		Non-album singles
"Alba" (featuring Don Pero)	2024	—	—		Non-album singles
"100mila"	2024	—	—		Non-album singles
"Nun m'annamor cchiù (to giur)" (featuring Federico di Napoli)	2024	—	—		Non-album singles
"Halo" (with Vito Salamanca)	2025	2	—	FIMI: Platinum	Amatore
"Ossessione" (with Vito Salamanca)	2026	1	32	FIMI: 2× Platinum	Amatore
"Flamenco paranoia" (with Vito Salamanca)	2026	12	—	FIMI: Gold	Amatore
"—" denotes singles that did not chart or were not released.

==== As featured artist ====
List of singles, with chart positions and album name
Title	Year	Peak chart positions	Certifications	Album or EP
Title	Year	ITA	Certifications	Album or EP
"Audemars" (MV Killa featuring Samurai Jay and Yung Snapp)	2019	—		Giovane killer
"A casa mia (Remix)" (with Livio Cori)	2019	—		Giovane killer
"Panico" (Peppe Soks and Dani featuring Samurai Jay)	2019	—		Montecalvario (Core senza paura)
"Natale marziano 2k19" (Gianluca Carbone featuring Anna Tatangelo, Geolier, Livio Cori, Roberto Colella, Peppe Soks, Samurai Jay, Francesco Da Vinci, Bles and Soul Food Vocalist)	2019	—		Non-album singles
"Vamos pa la banca" (Dat Boi Dee featuring Geolier, Samurai Jay and Lele Blade)	2020	49		Non-album singles
"Kriminal" (Shablo featuring Gué Pequeno, Gemitaiz and Samurai Jay)	2020	22		Non-album singles
"Il passo" (MamboLosco featuring Samurai Jay)	2020	47		Caldo
"Buongiorno" (Gigi D'Alessio feat. Vale Lambo, MV Killa, LDA, CoCo, Franco Ricciardi, Lele Blade, Enzo Dong, Clementino, Geolier and Samurai Jay)	2020	44	FIMI: Platinum	Buongiorno
"Guagliune" (Gigi D'Alessio feat. Enzo Dong, Ivan Granatino, Lele Blade and Samurai Jay)	2021	—		Buongiorno - Special Edition 2021
"Hermano" (Cancun feat. Samurai Jay)	2021	—		Non-album singles
"Domenica" (Voga feat. Samurai Jay)	2023	—		Non-album singles
"—" denotes singles that did not chart or were not released.

=== Collaborations ===
List of songs, with chart positions and album name
Title	Year	Peak chart positions	Certifications	Album or EP
Title	Year	ITA	Certifications	Album or EP
"Habla" (Junior Cally featuring Samurai Jay and Jake La Furia)	2019	—		Ricercato
"Te quemas (Remix)" (Elettra Lamborghini feat. Samurai Jay and MamboLosco)	2020	—		Twerking Queen (el resto es nada)
"No Stupid" (Dark Polo Gang featuring Boro and Samurai Jay)	2020	14		Dark Boys Club
"Fotomodelle un po' povere" (Gigi D'Alessio featuring Samurai Jay)	2020	—		Buongiorno
"Cielo nero" (Random featuring Carl Brave and Samurai Jay)	2021	—		Nuvole
"Novanta" (TY1 featuring Samurai Jay and Jake La Furia)	2021	—		Djungle
"Dinero" (Baby K featuring Samurai Jay and Boro)	2021	—		Donna sulla Luna
"Sirena" (Mace feat. Ernia, Samurai Jay and Darrn)	2021	27	FIMI: Gold	OBE
"Superstar" (Fred De Palma featuring Samurai Jay)	2021	—		Unico
"—" denotes singles that did not chart or were not released.
