= Désolé =

Désolé may refer to:

- "Désolé" (Gorillaz song), 2020
- "Désolé" (Sexion d'Assaut song), 2010
- "Désolé", a 2020 song by Mero, featuring Nimo

== See also ==
- Domenico De Sole (born 1944), Italian businessman
- Mattia Desole (born 1993), Swiss professional footballer
- "Désolée", a 2025 song by Anna
