= Il Ghost =

Albanian rapper (born 1998)

- Born: Lindon Bruti; 1998 (age 27–28); Viti
- Years active: 2020–present
- Musical career
- Genres: Hip-Hop; Rap
- Occupations: Rapper, singer, songwriter
- Instruments: vocals

Lindon Bruti (born 1998), known professionally as Il Ghost, is an Albanian-Italian rapper and songwriter.

== Biography ==
Bruti was born in Kosovo in 1998 but grew up in Italy. He started his musical career with Albanian and Italian rap songs in 2019. Together with Baby Gang he released Coco in 2020. He later collaborated with artists like Simba La Rue, Stresi, Capital T, Azet, Dardan or Nitro. In 2023, he released the album 1998.

== Discography ==
=== Albums ===
- Lindon Vol.1 (2022)
- 1998 (2023)
- Bisha (2024)

=== Singles ===
Year	Song
2020	"20 Cent" (feat. Soloperego)
2020	"Sun um prek"
2020	"Se na po dojna money"
2020	"Sun um prek 2"
2020	"New Wave"
2020	"Follow"
2021	"Ti nuk je burr"
2021	"Bandito" (feat. Simba La Rue)
2021	"Midis Europes" (feat. Stresi)
2021	"Made in Albania"
2022	"Sun um prek 3"
2022	"Milano Shqip"
2022	"A Te"
2022	"Te Stesso"
2022	"Io Sono Solo"
2023	"20 Albanesi"
2023	"Mare D’Inverno"
2023	"Drin Drin" (feat. LJK)
2023	"RATATA"
2023	"HI TECH" (feat. Dardan)
2024	"Albania Commando"
2024	"Pettinato" (feat. Side Baby)
2024	"Sola" (feat. Azet)
2024	"L’Odio"
2025	"Malade Mental"
2025	"FastLife"
2026	"Ali Baba"
