= Bugie =

Bugie may refer to:

- Elizabeth Bugie (1920–2001), American biochemist
- Natural Born Bugie, the debut single of English rock band Humble Pie (1969)
- An old spelling of Béjaïa, Algeria
- An Italian sweet pastry; see angel wings#Italy
- "Bugie" (song), a song by Italian rapper Shiva
