= Allenamento 4 =

"Allenamento #4"

Single by Capo Plaza

from the album Plaza
- Released: 8 January 2021
- Length: 2:45
- Label: Plaza; Warner
- Producers: Ava; Mojobeatz

Capo Plaza singles chronology
"Slatt" (2020)	"Allenamento #4" (2021)	"Street" (2021)

Music video
- "Allenamento 4" on YouTube

"Allenamento #4" is a song by Italian rapper Capo Plaza. It was produced by Ava and Mojobeatz, and released on 8 January 2021 as the lead single from the artist's third album Plaza.

The song topped the Italian singles chart and was certified platinum in Italy.

== Music video ==
The music video for "Allenamento #4", directed by Davide Vicari and Mastro Ent, was released on the same day via Plaza's YouTube channel. It was filmed at San Siro Stadium in Milan.

== Charts ==
Weekly chart performance for "Allenamento #4"
Chart (2021)	Peak position
Italy (FIMI)	1
Switzerland (Schweizer Hitparade)	97

== Certifications ==
Region	Certification	Certified units/sales
Italy (FIMI)	Platinum	70,000^{‡}
^{‡} Sales+streaming figures based on certification alone.
