= White Girl Wasted (song) =

2026 song by Anna

Single by Anna

from the album Million Dollar Babe
- Released: 19 June 2026
- Length: 2:22
- Label: EMI
- Songwriters: Anna Pepe; Jessica Porfiri; Niccolò Pucciarmati
- Producer: Miles

Anna singles chronology
"Push It" (2026)	"White Girl Wasted" (2026)

Music video
- "White Girl Wasted" on YouTube

"White Girl Wasted" is a song by Italian rapper Anna. It was produced by Miles and released by EMI on 19 June 2026 as the lead single from her second studio album, Million Dollar Babe.

The song peaked at number 4 on the Italian singles chart.

== Music video ==
The music video for the song was directed by Ent.tv and released on YouTube on 6 July 2026.

== Charts ==
Weekly chart performance for "White Girl Wasted"
Chart (2026)	Peak position
Italy (FIMI)	4
Italy Airplay (EarOne)	7

== Certifications ==
Region	Certification	Certified units/sales
Italy (FIMI)	Gold	100,000^{‡}
^{‡} Sales+streaming figures based on certification alone.
