= Moon (Ava song) =

2024 song by Ava featuring Capo Plaza and Tony Boy

Single by Ava featuring Capo Plaza and Tony Boy
- Released: 25 January 2024
- Length: 3:07
- Label: Warner
- Composer: Ava
- Lyricists: Capo Plaza; Tony Boy
- Producers: Ava; BLSSD

Ava singles chronology
"Vetri neri" (2023)	"Moon" (2024)	"Bacio di Giuda" (2024)

Capo Plaza singles chronology
"Parole vuote (la solitudine)" (2023)	"Moon" (2024)	"Acqua passata" (2024)

Tony Boy singles chronology
"Prova del nove" (2023)	"Moon" (2024)	"Kiss Kiss" (2024)

Music video
- "Moon" on YouTube

"Moon" is a 2024 song by Italian music producer Ava, with vocals by rappers Capo Plaza and Tony Boy. It was released on 25 January 2024 by Warner Music.

It peaked at number one on the FIMI singles chart and was certified gold in Italy.

== Music video ==
The official visual video for "Moon" was released on the same day via Ava's YouTube channel. A music video for an acoustic version of the song was released on 14 February 2024.

== Charts ==
Weekly chart performance for "Moon"
Chart (2024)	Peak position
Italy (FIMI)	1

== Certifications ==
Certifications for "Moon"
Region	Certification	Certified units/sales
Italy (FIMI)	Gold	50,000^{‡}
^{‡} Sales+streaming figures based on certification alone.
