= Baby Gang =

Italian-Moroccan rapper (born 2001)

- Born: Zaccaria Mouhib; 26 June 2001 (age 25); Lecco, Italy
- Genres: Hip-hop; trap; gangsta rap
- Occupations: Rapper; songwriter
- Years active: 2018–present
- Labels: No Parla Tanto Records (NPT Records); Real Music 4 Ever; Warner Music Italy

Zaccaria Mouhib (Arabic: زكريا محب, romanized: Zakariyyā Mūhīb; born 26 June 2001), known professionally as Baby Gang, is an Italian-Moroccan rapper. He began his musical career in 2018, releasing his debut EP, EP1, in 2021.

== Early life ==
Zaccaria Mouhib was born in 2001 in Lecco to a Moroccan family. He grew up between Lecco and the nearby town of Calolziocorte before moving to Morocco, where his mother took him to live first in Meknès and then for a year in Casablanca. Upon returning to Italy, he lived in a small two-room apartment in a situation of severe economic hardship with his six siblings and absent parents. In 2013, while attending middle school in Ponte in Valtellina, he decided to stop being a burden on his family and ran away from home. During this time, he came into contact with other teenagers in similar situations. His friends had nicknamed him "Baby Gang".

== Career ==
=== 2018–2020: first singles and criminal activity ===
After several attempts to escape from the youth facilities he was placed in, he came into contact with Don Claudio Burgio, a priest in charge of the Kayros community, who tried to steer him away from drug use and helped him pursue a music career. In April 2018, Baby Gang uploaded the single "Street" on YouTube, which achieved modest success. He then composed "Fuck la pula", which was recorded in a studio during a period of detention. However, the track was short-lived; it was immediately removed after publication due to its excessively violent lyrics, and Zaccaria was arrested again for robbery.

In 2019, after his release, he published "Educazione" and "Cella 1", two tracks describing his prison experience. He later removed the first of these songs from Spotify, stating he regretted releasing it. Also on Spotify, he uploaded the single "Coco" with Italo-Albanian rapper Il Ghost. In early 2020, he released the single "Blitz", and that same year began his first collaborations. He released the single "Bimbi Soldato" with his friend Sacky, but a dawn raid by the Digos police followed due to the presence of weapons in the music video, and they were also investigated for illegal possession of weapons in a public place and glorification of crime. Also in 2020, he collaborated with the Varese group titled 167 Gang on the single "Baby gang", and ended the year with the singles "Caramba" and "Cella 2", which achieved good success.

=== 2021: EP 1, Delinquente, and rise to fame ===
Zaccaria began 2021 by releasing the single "Baby", followed by "Treni" with Il Ghost, which was very successful. He was then featured on Vale Pain's single "Shotta 2". These were followed by the singles "No Parla Tanto" and "Blitz 2", the latter a collaboration with French rapper Sofiane. He then released his first EP, a seven-track project titled "EP 1". The project featured other rappers such as Il Ghost, Omar, Rondodasosa, Neima Ezza, and Escomar. He was also featured on Simba La Rue's single "Banlieue" alongside Philip.

He then released the single "Alcott Zara Bershka", produced by Higashi, which preceded his first album, "Delinquente", released on August 27, 2021. The album details how music changed his life. It reached number seven on the Italian charts, featuring collaborations with rappers like Il Ghost, Sacky, Capo Plaza, and J Lord, as well as international features like ElGrandeToto, Moro, and Morad. He was a guest on the "Muschio selvaggio" podcast. He then featured on Sacky's single "Gennaro&Ciro" alongside the French-Algerian rapper Lacrim, and on the single "Hood Love" by producer Dat Boi Dee alongside J Lord.

=== 2022: EP 2, "Mentalité", and popularity ===
Zaccaria started 2022 by releasing the single "Shoot" with Sacky and Gazo, produced by Nko. He was then featured on singles by Escomar ("Fratello Mio"), Ashafar ("Maffia"), and Cancun ("Charitè").

He then released the singles "Paranoia", produced by Bobo, and "Come Te", produced by Trobi, which preceded his second EP, "EP 2". The 9-track project featured only Sacky and Bené, with producers including Trobi, Bobo, and Higashi. The single "Mentalité" stood out, being certified platinum and achieving significant success abroad: it was the 68th most-listened-to single in Switzerland in 2022, and in 2023, the 55th most-listened-to in Germany and the 7th most-listened-to in Sweden.

=== 2023: Innocente ===
On March 17, 2023, Zaccaria was featured on RAF Camora's single "Connexion". He then released four remixes of his track "Mentalité" with Ashe 22, Neves17, C.Gambino, and Kalim. On May 25, he released his second studio album, "Innocente", boasting collaborations with major Italian artists like Guè, Emis Killa, Ghali, Rondodasosa, Baby K, and Lazza, as well as international artists like Lacrim and Elai. The album was produced by Bobo, FT Kings, and 2nd Roof. It reached number two on the Italian charts and was the 29th most-listened-to album of 2023. Zaccaria then released the remix of the track "Napoletano" with SLF as the first release from the deluxe edition. On October 6, 2023, he released the single "Seconda generazione", produced by Higashi, as the second release from the deluxe edition of "Innocente", which was released on October 13. The deluxe edition featured Simba La Rue, J Lord, and international rappers like the French artists Maes, Jul, and again, Morad.

Throughout the year, he appeared on many other features, such as Sacky's "Dov'eri?", Ashe 22's "Caracas", Escomar and Simba La Rue's "Carne Halal", and Lacrim's "John Gotti". He also appeared on Sfera Ebbasta's album "X2VR" again with Simba La Rue and with Geolier on the track "Calcolatrici".

=== 2024–2025: L'angelo del male ===
In early 2024, he was featured on Simba La Rue's album on the track "Beccaria San Vittore" and on Jul's single "Blocco". He then released the singles "Hebs" and "Karma", produced by Higashi, and was featured on the singles "Ma Douce" by Gims and "In Italia 2024" by Fabri Fibra with Emma. He also released the single "Adrenalina" with Blanco and Marracash. On April 26, he released "L'angelo del male", his third studio album. The album debuted at number one in Italy and number five in Switzerland, containing nineteen tracks produced by Poison Beatz, Higashi, and Bobo. The album featured only Italian collaborations; alongside Marracash and Blanco were many artists already known to the public, such as Paky, Jake La Furia, Emis Killa, Geolier, Sfera Ebbasta, Rocco Hunt, Niko Pandetta, Guè, Gemitaiz, MadMan, Fabri Fibra, Lazza, Tedua, Simba La Rue, and Rkomi.

After appearing on Russ Millions' album, he returned in September 2024 with the single "Tu me quieres" with Omega, produced by Higashi and Roberto Ferrante. He was subsequently featured on Emma's single "Hangover", Accaoui's single "Hania" with Lacrim, and ElGrandeToto's single "Coltellino". On November 1, he released the single "Danse" with Noizy. On January 10, 2025, the single "Misère", produced by Higashi, was released. He then released the single "Rassi" with ElGrandeToto and was featured on Fred De Palma's single "Sexy rave". On June 6, the single "Cassa" was released, followed on July 18 by the single "Kriminal" with El Alfa, Omega, and Roberto Ferrante, a track with which he reached the number one spot on the Top Singoli chart for the first time in his career.

== Legal issues ==
Between 2020 and 2021, Baby Gang was convicted on several crimes, including defamation, infringement of intellectual property, and others.

On 20 August 2021, he received a D.A.SPO. (a banning order) from Milan police for two years alongside Rondodasosa following riots at a disco; the order prevented him from entering bars, discos and public places in the city. In April 2022, an exemption was made in order to allow him to play at a club in Milan on 9 May.

In January 2023, Baby Gang was arrested alongside two other rappers for four robberies committed in Milan and Sondrio; it was alleged that the three rappers were behind the robberies. In April, he was charged with resisting arrest after attacking two police officers and fleeing a traffic stop.

On 26 January 2023, he was sentenced to four years and 10 months in prison.

== Discography ==
=== Studio albums ===
List of albums, with selected details and chart positions
| Title | Details | Peak chart positions | | |
| Title | Details | ITA | BEL (WA) | SWI |
|---|---|---|---|---|
| Innocente | Released: 26 May 2023; Label: Warner Music Italy | 2 | 137 | 6 |
| L'angelo del male | Released: 26 April 2024; Label: Warner Music Italy | 1 | — | 5 |

=== EPs ===
List of EPs, with selected details and chart positions
| Title | Details | Peak chart positions |
| Title | Details | ITA |
|---|---|---|
| EP1 | Released: 14 May 2021; Label: Warner Music Italy | 15 |
| Delinquente | Released: 27 August 2021; Label: Warner Music Italy | 7 |
| EP2 | Released: 17 June 2022; Label: Warner Music Italy | 7 |

=== Charted singles ===
==== As lead artist ====
List of charted singles as lead artist
| Title | Year | Peak chart positions | Album |
| Title | Year | ITA | Album |
|---|---|---|---|
| "Marocchino" | 2021 | 73 | EP1 |
| "Boy" (with Bobo, featuring Rondodasosa) | 2021 | 76 | EP1 |
| "Rapina" (featuring Nemina Ezza) | 2021 | 88 | EP1 |
| "Ma chérie" (featuring Capo Plaza) | 2021 | 74 | Delinquente |
| "Paranoia" (with Bobo) | 2022 | 54 | EP2 |
| "9.19" (with Salmo, Luciennn and Bobo) | 2022 | 27 | Non-album single |
| "Cella 3" | 2022 | 80 | EP2 |
| "Lei" (featuring Bené) | 2022 | 14 | EP2 |
| "Seconda generazione" | 2023 | 60 | Non-album singles |
| "Bentley" (featuring Simba La Rue and J Lord) | 2023 | 43 | Non-album singles |
| "Hebs" | 2024 | 77 | Non-album singles |
| "Adrenalina" (featuring Blanco and Marracash) | 2024 | 13 | L'angelo del male |
| "Tu Me Quieres" (with Omega, Higashi and Roberto Ferrante) | 2024 | 11 | Non-album singles |
| "Kriminal" (featuring El Alfa, Omega and Roberto Ferrante) | 2025 | 1 | Non-album singles |
| "Maria" (with Il Ghost) | 2026 | 91 | Non-album singles |

==== As featured artist ====
List of charted singles as featured artist
| Title | Year | Peak chart positions | Album |
| Title | Year | ITA | Album |
|---|---|---|---|
| "Sacoche" (Simba La Rue featuring Baby Gang) | 2020 | — | |
| "Eurovision" (Central Cee featuring Rondodasosa, Baby Gang, A2anti, Morad, Benny Jr, Ashe 22 and Freeze Corleone) | 2022 | 57 | 23 |
| "Drari" (Ghali featuring Baby Gang) | 2022 | 97 | Sensazione ultra |
| "In Italia 2024" (Fabri Fibra featuring Emma and Baby Gang) | 2024 | 16 | Non-album single |
| "Hangover" (Emma featuring Baby Gang) | 2024 | 68 | Souvenir |
| "Sexy Rave" (Fred De Palma featuring Baby Gang) | 2025 | 38 | Non-album single |
