= Million Dollar Babe =

Studio album by Anna
- Released: 10 July 2026
- Genres: Hip hop; pop; trap; EDM
- Length: 31:17
- Label: EMI
- Producers: Miles; FT Kings; Gizzy Draco; Killer Garth; Mosy; Okkvalmo

Anna chronology
| Vera Baddie (2024) | Million Dollar Babe (2026) |

Singles from Million Dollar Babe
- 1. "White Girl Wasted" Released: 19 June 2026

Million Dollar Babe is the second studio album by Italian rapper Anna, released on 10 July 2026 through EMI.

== Track listing ==
Million Dollar Babe track listing
| No. | Title | Lyrics | Music | Producer(s) | Length |
|---|---|---|---|---|---|
| 1. | "Million Dollar Babe" | Anna Pepe | Nicolò Pucciarmati | Miles | 2:53 |
| 2. | "Don't Tell Nobody" | Pepe | Omar Duro; Pucciarmati | Miles | 2:21 |
| 3. | "White Girl Wasted" | Pepe; Jessica Porfiri | Pucciarmati | Miles | 2:22 |
| 4. | "Sono io il pass" (featuring Lazza) | Pepe; Jacopo Lazzarini | Lazzarini; Pucciamarti | Miles | 2:15 |
| 5. | "Catalano" | Pepe | Xavier Prats Abellán; Pucciarmati | Miles | 2:28 |
| 6. | "Cuore in off" | Pepe; Lorenzo Vicentin Fornaca | Fornaca; Gizzy Draco; Pucciarmati | Draco; Miles | 1:48 |
| 7. | "Scontrosa" (featuring G.Mineiro) | Pepe; Edoardo Sorbero; Antonio Romero Monge; Rafael Ruiz Perdigones | Monge; Ruiz Perdigones; Federico Trinx; Pucciarmati | FT Kings; Miles | 1:54 |
| 8. | "Safari" (featuring Astro and Tony Boy) | Pepe; Antonio Hueber; Rida Amhahouch | Pucciarmati | Miles | 2:59 |
| 9. | "Crystal collo" | Pepe | Simone De Ceglie; Pucciarmati | Miles; Mosy | 2:36 |
| 10. | "Hot Pot" (interlude) | Pepe | Pucciarmati | Miles | 0:40 |
| 11. | "U Like Me" | Pepe | Pucciarmati | Miles | 1:51 |
| 12. | "Benihana" | Pepe | Alessandro Valmori; Nicolò Zangheri; Pucciarmati | Killer Garth; Miles; Okkvalmo | 2:10 |
| 13. | "Honey" | Pepe | Pucciarmati | Miles | 2:29 |
| 14. | "Veleno" | Pepe | Pucciarmati | Miles | 2:31 |
| Total length: | | | | | 31:17 |

== Charts ==
Chart performance for Million Dollar Babe
| Chart (2026) | Peak position |
|---|---|
| Italian Albums (FIMI) | 1 |
| Swiss Albums (Schweizer Hitparade) | 26 |

== Certifications ==
Certifications for Million Dollar Babe
| Region | Certification | Certified units/sales |
|---|---|---|
| Italy (FIMI) | Platinum | 50,000^{‡} |
^{‡} Sales+streaming figures based on certification alone.
