= Cadillac (Boro song) =

Single by Boro featuring Artie 5ive and Andry the Hitmaker

from the album Bendicion
- Released: 22 September 2023
- Length: 2:35
- Label: Universal
- Producer: Andry the Hitmaker

Boro singles chronology
"Coco Chanel" (2023)	"Cadillac" (2023)	"Cheerleader" (2023)

Music video
- "Cadillac" on YouTube

"Cadillac" is a song by Italian rapper Boro featuring rapper Artie 5ive and record producer Andry the Hitmaker. It was released on 22 September 2023 by Universal as a single for Boro's studio album Bendicion.

The song is a "snapshot of a Cadillac ride", narrated "like a film" as the artist describes everything he sees along the way. It combines Boro's Latin-leaning sound with Artie 5ive's trap style, reflecting the different backgrounds the two bring to the track.

The song topped the FIMI singles chart.

== Music video ==
The music video for "Cadillac", directed by Peter Marvu, was released on 25 September 2023 via Boro's YouTube channel.

== Charts ==
=== Weekly charts ===
Weekly chart performance for "Cadillac"
Chart (2023)	Peak position
Italy (FIMI)	1

=== Year-end charts ===
2023 year-end chart performance for "Cadillac"
Chart	Position
Italy (FIMI)	92

== Certifications ==
Certification for "Cadillac"
Region	Certification	Certified units/sales
Italy (FIMI)	2× Platinum	200,000^{‡}
^{‡} Sales+streaming figures based on certification alone.
