= Livio Cori =

Italian rapper and actor

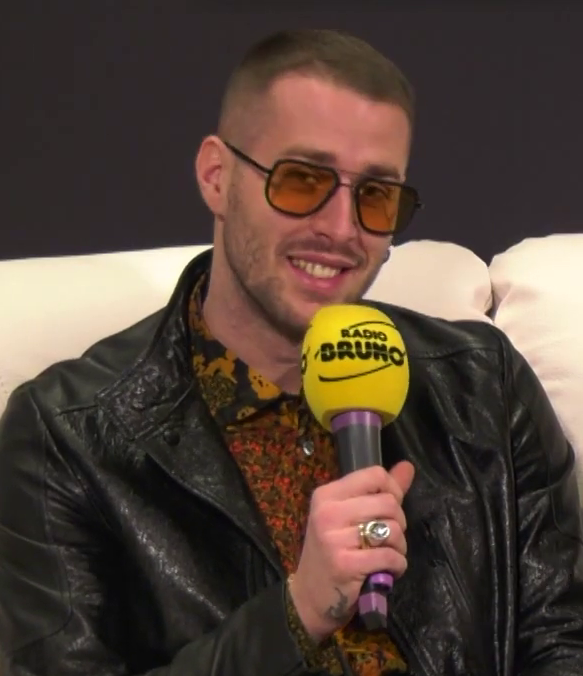

Background information
- Born: 12 March 1990 (age 36); Naples, Campania, Italy
- Genres: Hip hop
- Occupation: Rapper
- Years active: 2008–present
- Label: Sugar Music

Livio Cori (born 12 March 1990) is an Italian rapper and actor.

In 2015 he released his breakthrough single "Tutta la notte", featuring Ghemon, and published his first EP Delay in 2017. He signed in with label Sugar Music in 2018 and released his debut album Montecalvario (Core senza paura) on 8 February 2019.

He participated at the Sanremo Music Festival 2019 with the song "Un'altra luce", together with Nino D'Angelo.

As an actor, he played the role of O' Selfi in fifteen episodes of the TV series Gomorrah (2017–2019).

== Discography ==
=== Studio albums ===
- Montecalvario (Core senza paura) (2019)
- Femmena (2020)

=== EPs ===
- Delay (2017)
- Montecalvario (2018)
- Blu verano (2021)

=== Singles ===
- "Ora" feat. Ntò (2013)
- "Mai" (2013)
- "Amnesia" (2014)
- "Tutta la notte" feat. Ghemon (2015)
- "Veleno" (2016)
- "Non c'è fretta" (2016)
- "Surdat" (2017)
- "Nennè" (2018)
- "Un'altra luce" with Nino D'Angelo (2019)
- "A casa mia" feat. Samurai Jay (2019)
- "Adda passà" feat. CoCo (2019)
- "Abracadabra" feat. La Zero (2020)
- "Nu vase tuoje" feat. Francesco Da Vinci and Nathys (2020)
- "Vasm" feat. Eris Gacha (2021)
- "Verano" (2021)
