= 30°C =

Single by Anna

from the album Vera Baddie
- Released: 31 May 2024
- Genre: Dance pop
- Length: 2:22
- Label: EMI; Universal
- Songwriters: Anna Pepe; Niccolò Pucciarmati; Marco Bressan
- Producers: Young Miles; Toto Beats; Arty

Anna singles chronology
| "BBE" (2024) | "30°C" (2024) | "Tonight" (2024) |

Music video
- "30°C" on YouTube

"30°C" (Italian: Trenta gradi, lit. 'Thirty degrees') is a song by Italian rapper Anna. It was produced by Young Miles, Arty and Toto Beats, and released by EMI and Universal on 31 May 2024 as the fourth single from the artist's debut studio album, Vera Baddie.

The song peaked at number 1 on the Italian singles chart.

== Music video ==
The music video for the song was directed by Amedeo Zancanella and released on YouTube on 14 June 2024.

== Charts ==
=== Weekly charts ===
Weekly chart performance for "30°C"
| Chart (2024) | Peak position |
|---|---|
| Italy (FIMI) | 1 |
| Italy Airplay (EarOne) | 1 |

=== Year-end charts ===
Year-end chart performance for "30°C"
| Chart | Year | Position |
|---|---|---|
| Italy (FIMI) | 2024 | 9 |
| Italy (FIMI) | 2025 | 90 |

== Certifications ==
| Region | Certification | Certified units/sales |
|---|---|---|
| Italy (FIMI) | 3× Platinum | 300,000^{‡} |
^{‡} Sales+streaming figures based on certification alone.
