= Everyday (Takagi & Ketra song) =

2023 song by Takagi & Ketra

- Official cover

Single by Takagi & Ketra featuring Shiva, Anna and Geolier
- Released: 13 October 2023
- Genre: Pop
- Length: 3:10
- Label: Columbia; Sony Music
- Lyricists: Andrea Arrigoni; Anna Pepe; Emanuele Palumbo; Alberto Cotta Ramusino; Alessandro Merli; Fabio Clemente
- Producers: Takagi & Ketra

Takagi & Ketra singles chronology
"Chiagne" (2022)	"Everyday" (2023)

Shiva singles chronology
"Syrup" (2023)	"Everyday" (2023)	"Milano Shotta Freestyle" (2024)

Anna singles chronology
"Vetri neri" (2023)	"Everyday" (2023)	"Petit fou fou" (2023)

Geolier singles chronology
"Oro e diamanti" (2023)	"Everyday" (2023)	"Campioni in Italia (Red Bull 64 Bars)" (2023)

Music video
- "Everyday" on YouTube

"Everyday" is a 2023 song by Italian recording producers Takagi & Ketra, with featured vocals by Italian rappers Shiva, Anna and Geolier. It was written by the duo with the featured artists and features co-writing contribution by Italian singer Tananai. The song was released on 13 October 2023.

The song peaked at number 1 on the Italian singles chart and was certified triple platinum in Italy.

== Music video ==
A visual music video of "Everyday", directed by Diego Ferri, was released on 18 October 2023 via the YouTube channel of Takagi & Ketra.

== Charts ==
=== Weekly charts ===
Weekly chart performance for "Everyday"
Chart (2023–24)	Peak position
Italy (FIMI)	1
Switzerland (Schweizer Hitparade)	44

=== Year-end charts ===
2023 year-end chart performance for "Everyday"
Chart (2023)	Position
Italy (FIMI)	44

2024 year-end chart performance for "Everyday"
Chart (2024)	Position
Italy (FIMI)	33

== Certifications ==
Region	Certification	Certified units/sales
Italy (FIMI)	3× Platinum	300,000^{‡}
^{‡} Sales+streaming figures based on certification alone.
