= Kriminal (song) =

Single by Baby Gang featuring El Alfa, Omega and Roberto Ferrante
- Released: 18 July 2025
- Length: 3:09
- Label: Planet Records
- Composer: Roberto Ferrante
- Lyricists: Baby Gang; El Alfa; Omega
- Producer: Roberto Ferrante

Baby Gang singles chronology
| "Sentir" (2025) | "Kriminal" (2025) | "District" (2025) |

El Alfa singles chronology
| "Voltio" (2025) | "Kriminal" (2025) | "Pirata" (2025) |

Omega singles chronology
| "KLK" (2025) | "Kriminal" (2025) |

Music video
- "Kriminal" on YouTube

"Kriminal" is a song by Italian-Moroccan rapper Baby Gang with featured vocals by Dominican artists El Alfa and Omega, and produced by Roberto Ferrante. It was released on 18 July 2025 by Planet Records.

The song topped the FIMI singles chart.

== Music video ==
The music video for "Kriminal" was released on the same day via Baby Gang's YouTube channel.

== Charts ==
=== Weekly charts ===
Weekly chart performance for "Kriminal"
| Chart (2025) | Peak position |
|---|---|
| Italy (FIMI) | 1 |
| Italy Airplay (EarOne) | 99 |

=== Year-end charts ===
Year-end chart performance for "Kriminal"
| Chart (2025) | Position |
|---|---|
| Italy (FIMI) | 61 |

== Certifications ==
Certifications for "Kriminal"
| Region | Certification | Certified units/sales |
|---|---|---|
| Italy (FIMI) | Platinum | 200,000^{‡} |
^{‡} Sales+streaming figures based on certification alone.
