= Bando (song) =

2020 song by Anna

- Official cover

Single by Anna
- Released: 31 January 2020
- Genre: Hip house
- Length: 2:44
- Label: Virgin
- Composer: Martin Purcell
- Lyricist: Anna Pepe
- Producer: Soulker

Anna singles chronology
"Bando" (2020)	"Bla bla" (2020)

"Bando" is the debut single by Italian rapper Anna. It was released by Virgin Records on 31 January 2020.

The song peaked at number 1 on the Italian singles chart and was certified double platinum in Italy. An official remixed version with featured vocals by Italian rappers Gemitaiz and MadMan was released on 24 April 2020 and later included in the soundtrack of the 2023 film Fast X.

== Release ==
An early version of the song was published on various music streaming platforms in November 2019. It was removed after two weeks for copyright infringement, due to the sampling of a beat by French music producer Soulker. At the start of 2020, Anna signed a contract with Virgin Records through which "Bando" was republished on 31 January, after having secured the usage rights from Soulker.

On 24 April 2020, an official remix of "Bando" was released featuring the Italian rappers Gemitaiz and MadMan. This version of the song was included in the soundtrack of the 2023 film Fast X. On 15 May 2020, another remix of "Bando" was released with the German rapper Maxwell, reaching number 80 in Germany and number 70 in Switzerland. A remix single with British producer Endor was released on 11 June 2020, followed two weeks later by a new version featuring American rapper Rich the Kid. A music video for the latter, directed by Sebastian Sdaigui and Gianluigi Carella, was released via YouTube on 30 June.

== Track listing ==
Digital download – Standard edition
No.	Title	Length
1.	"Bando"	2:48

Digital download – Remix
No.	Title	Length
1.	"Bando (Remix)" (featuring Gemitaiz and MadMan)	2:49

Digital download – Remix
No.	Title	Length
1.	"Bando (Remix)" (featuring Maxwell)	2:40

Digital download – Endor Remix
No.	Title	Length
1.	"Bando (Endor Radio Remix)" (featuring Endor)	3:04
2.	"Bando (Endor Club Remix)" (featuring Endor)	5:38

Digital download – Remix
No.	Title	Length
1.	"Bando (Remix)" (featuring Rich the Kid)	2:23

== Commercial performance ==
At the end of February 2020, "Bando" reached number one on the Italian singles chart, remaining at the top for three consecutive weeks and making Anna the youngest artist to top the chart. The single also topped the Italian Spotify, iTunes and Shazam charts. "Bando" also received international attention, with adds to official Spotify playlists and radio play in countries including France and the United States. In the former country, it placed at number 92 on the singles chart.

== Charts ==
=== Weekly charts ===
Weekly chart performance for "Bando"
Chart (2020)	Peak position
Austria (Ö3 Austria Top 40)	47
France (SNEP)	92
Germany (GfK)	80
Italy (FIMI)	1
Switzerland (Schweizer Hitparade)	70

=== Year-end charts ===
Year-end chart performance for "Bando"
Chart (2020)	Position
Italy (FIMI)	31

== Certifications ==
Region	Certification	Certified units/sales
France (SNEP)	Platinum	200,000^{‡}
Italy (FIMI)	2× Platinum	140,000^{‡}
^{‡} Sales+streaming figures based on certification alone.
