= VillaBanks =

- Born: Vieri Igor Traxler; 17 August 2000 (age 26); Ravenna, Italy
- Genres: Hip hop, Reggaeton, Dirty rap
- Occupation: Rapper
- Years active: 2018–present
- Labels: Virgin Records, Universal,

Vieri Igor Traxler (born 17 August 2000), known professionally as VillaBanks, is an Italian rapper.

== Biography ==
Born in Ravenna, he spent his youth moving several times due to his father's work, between Switzerland, France, Florence (where he graduated at French high school "Victor Hugo") and Milan; for a short time he also lived in New York. At the age of six he started playing the saxophone, an instrument which he abandoned when he became passionate about rap music at the age of fifteen.

In 2019 he self-published his debut album Non lo so, certified gold in 2023. One of the tracks, "Candy", went viral and marked his first entry into the Italian music charts, where it reached 79th place. The song was certified platinum by the Italian Music Industry Federation with over 70,000 units sold nationwide. Thanks to the success achieved, in April 2020 the rapper signed his first recording contract with Virgin Records, part of the Universal Music Italia group, on which he re-released his second album Quanto manca. El puto mundo, his third album, was released the following September and produced another platinum hit, "Pasticche" featuring Capo Plaza.

Throughout 2021 VillaBanks collaborated with various colleagues on tracks for their albums, including Madame ("Mood"), TY1 ("Squali"), Briga ("Colpa dell'alcool") and Alfa ("Sold Out"). His fourth album, Filtri, was released in May of the same year and was reissued as Filtri + Nudo two months later. It reached number 8 on the FIMI Album Chart, becoming his first top ten, and was certified gold with over 25,000 units sold. The following November he held his first concerts as a soloist in Milan and Rome.

In 2022, he released the song "Tête" with DJ producer Ava and rapper Medy, which was certified three times platinum by FIMI. On October 27, 2023, he released his fifth studio album, VillaBanks, featuring rappers such as Tony Effe, Shiva, Paky, Bello FiGo and Guè. It reached position 4 in the Italian Album Charts, whereas the track "Papaya" contained in the same album, reached the same position in the Singles Chart.

On 5 July 2024, Villabanks released his sixth studio album SPINGERE SEMPRE.

On 10 January 2025, VillaBanks released his seventh studio album Quanto Manca 2.

== Discography ==
=== Studio albums ===
- Non lo so (2019)
- Quanto manca (2020)
- El puto mundo (2020)
- Filtri (2021)
- Sex Festival (2022)
- VillaBanks (2023)

=== EPs ===
- La filosofia (2022)
- Spingere sempre (2024)
