= Ayahuasca (Simba La Rue song) =

Single by Simba La Rue featuring Tony Boy
- Released: 3 January 2025
- Length: 3:08
- Label: No Parla Tanto; Warner
- Composer: Federico Trinx
- Lyricists: Simba La Rue; Tony Boy
- Producer: FT Kings

Simba La Rue singles chronology
"VRP" (2024)	"Ayahuasca" (2025)	"Cazzi miei" (2025)

Tony Boy singles chronology
"Etc" (2024)	"Ayahuasca" (2025)	"Wet" (2025)

Music video
- "Ayahuasca" on YouTube

"Ayahuasca" is a song by Tunisian-Italian rapper Simba La Rue with featured vocals by Tony Boy. It was released on 3 January 2025 by No Parla Tanto and Warner.

The song topped the FIMI singles chart.

== Music video ==
The music video for "Ayahuasca" was released on the same day via Simba La Rue's YouTube channel.

== Charts ==
Weekly chart performance for "Ayahuasca"
Chart (2025)	Peak position
Italy (FIMI)	1

== Certifications ==
Certifications for "Ayahuasca"
Region	Certification	Certified units/sales
Italy (FIMI)	Gold	100,000^{‡}
^{‡} Sales+streaming figures based on certification alone.
