= Neon (Sfera Ebbasta and Shiva song) =

Single by Sfera Ebbasta and Shiva

from the album Santana Money Gang
- Released: 14 April 2025
- Length: 3:46
- Label: Island; Universal
- Songwriters: Gionata Boschetti; Andrea Arrigoni; Laura Palmas; Diego Vincenzo Vettraino
- Producer: Drillionaire

Sfera Ebbasta singles chronology
"Anche stasera" (2023)	"Neon" (2025)	"Yakuza" (2025)

Shiva singles chronology
"Anno fantastico" (2025)	"Neon" (2025)	"Take 6" (2025)

"Neon" is a song by Italian rappers Sfera Ebbasta and Shiva. It was released on 14 April 2025 as the lead single from the artists' joint album Santana Money Gang. The song topped the Italian Singles Chart.

== Charts ==
=== Weekly charts ===
Weekly chart performance for "Neon"
Chart (2025)	Peak position
Italy (FIMI)	1
Italy Airplay (EarOne)	31
Switzerland (Schweizer Hitparade)	74

=== Year-end charts ===
Year-end chart performance for "Neon"
Chart (2025)	Position
Italy (FIMI)	5

== Certifications ==
Region	Certification	Certified units/sales
Italy (FIMI)	2× Platinum	400,000^{‡}
^{‡} Sales+streaming figures based on certification alone.
