= Omega (singer) =

Dominican singer (born 1972)

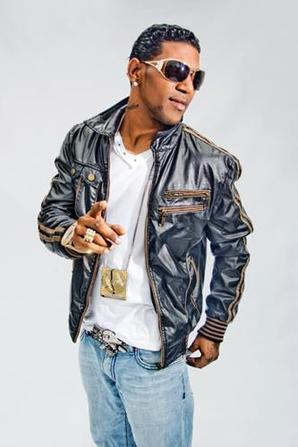
- Omega in 2010

Background information
- Born: Antonio Peter De la Rosa; 17 January 1972 (age 54); Bonao, Dominican Republic
- Genres: Merengue; merengue urbano
- Occupation: Singer
- Instrument: Vocals
- Years active: 1985–present
- Labels: Allegro Music; Planet Europe
- Website: omegaelfuerte.com (in Spanish)

Antonio Peter De la Rosa (born 17 January 1972) better known by his stage name Omega "El Fuerte" or simply Omega, is a Dominican singer. He is a modern day merengue artist based in Santo Domingo, Dominican Republic. Since 2003, Omega has enjoyed increased popularity in the Dominican Republic and with Dominican-Americans across the United States. He has also penetrated music markets in Spain, Italy, and Latin America.

Omega has helped create and popularize a new form of merengue, called merengue urbano or merengue de calle. It is a blend of merengue with hip hop and R&B. This new genre has been adopted by many artists from diverse backgrounds such as Cuban-American Pitbull and Colombian Shakira.

== Musical career ==
Peter De la Rosa began developing his musical talent at a young age, by 13 years of age in 1985 he formed his first rap group. Afterward he began appearing on variety TV shows in the Dominican Republic and won several singing competitions as part of the group Alpha y Omega in 1989, from which he derives his stage name. Later on Omega formed the band Omega y Su Mambo Violento in 1998, which in 2006 released its first album titled homonymously on the label Allegro Music. The album spawned his break-out hit, "Alante Alante". This was followed by a Casandra Award, given in the Dominican Republic in 2009.

In 2010, Omega attended his first Latin Grammy Awards and also performed at Presidente Beer's Festival of Latin Music; both events were pivotal to his international recognition. Also in 2010, Omega toured the United States and performed in New York City's Manhattan Armory and at Elizabeth, New Jersey's Ritz theater, among other venues. Omega's continued popularity and his Producer Bismark Ayala/MALA CARA 809 led to him being signed by Akon, through his record label Konvict Musik in 2011. Akon has confessed that Omega has helped him to conquer the Dominican market. Akon has also influenced Omega's music leading to Merengue with an Electronic blend as can be heard in Omega's 2012 hit, "Merengue Electronico" Produced by DJ RICKY AND MALA CARA 809.

== Personal life ==
Omega was born Antonio Peter De la Rosa in the town of Bonao, Dominican Republic, the son of Ercilia De La Rosa and Sergio Peter. He grew up in the Pantoja neighborhood of Santo Domingo. Omega is currently married to Miguelina Sanchez; they have two daughters.

=== Legal issues ===
Peter De la Rosa's musical career has been marred by multiple encounters with authorities in the Dominican Republic. He has been arrested on several occasions for failing to pay child support, domestic violence, and breach of contract.

== Discography ==
=== Studio albums ===
Year	Title	Album details	Peak chart positions		
Year	Title	Album details	US Latin	US Tropical	Certifications
2006	Omega y Su Mambo Violento		—	—	
2007	El Fuerte		—	—	
2007	En La Gran Mansion De Moca		—	—	
2009	El Dueño del Flow	Released: October 1, 2009; Label: Allegro; Formats: CD, digital download	27	4	
2011	El Dueño del Flow 2	Released: October 21, 2011; Label: Planet Records; Formats: CD, digital download	36	3	RIAA: Gold (Latin)
2016	Mi Libertad	Released: October 28, 2016; Label: El Fuerte II, Konvict Kartel; Formats: CD, digital download	—	—	
"—" denotes releases that did not chart.

=== Solo ===
Title	Year	Peak chart positions				Certifications	Album
Title	Year	US Latin	US Latin Digital	US Latin Pop	SPA	Certifications	Album
"Merengue Electronico"	2009	40	48	31	—	RIAA: Platinum (Latin)	El Dueño del Flow
"Si Te Vas (¿Qué Tengo Que Hacer?)"	2009	—	42	35	45	RIAA: Platinum (Latin)	El Dueño del Flow
"Mr. Saxobeat"	2011	—	25	—	—		Non-album single
"—" denotes the single failed to chart or not released

=== As featured performer ===
Year	Single	Peak chart positions			Album
Year	Single	US Latin	US Latin Digital	US Latin Pop	Album
2008	"Mi Alma Se Muere" (Fuego featuring Omega "El Fuerte" and Pitbull)	—	—	1	Chosen Few III
2011	"Dándole" (Gocho featuring Jowell y Omega "El Fuerte")	22	14	21	Mi Musica
2023	"Arranca" (Becky G featuring Omega")	—	7	32	Non-album single
2025	"Kriminal" (Baby Gang featuring El Alfa, Omega and Roberto Ferrante)	—	—	—	Non-album single
"—" denotes releases that did not chart.
