= Bugie (song) =

Single by Shiva
- Released: 27 August 2026
- Length: 3:13
- Label: Milano Ovest; Sony
- Composers: Drillionaire; Tommaso Torelli; Luca Ferraresi
- Lyricist: Shiva
- Producers: Drillionaire; Toro2x

Shiva singles chronology
"Take 6" (2025)	"Bugie" (2026)

"Bugie" (Italian for "lies") is a song by Italian rapper Shiva, released on 27 August 2026 by Milano Ovest and Sony Music, and included in the digital reissue of his seventh studio album, Vangelo. It was written by Shiva and produced by Drillionaire and Tommaso Torelli, known professionally as Toro2x.

The song debuted at number 1 on the FIMI singles chart.

== Charts ==
Weekly chart performance for "Bugie"
Chart (2026)	Peak position
Italy (FIMI)	1
