= Take 6 (song) =

Single by Shiva
- Released: 25 November 2025
- Length: 2:44
- Label: Milano Ovest; Sony
- Composer: Drillionaire
- Lyricist: Shiva
- Producer: Drillionaire

Shiva singles chronology
"Neon" (2025)	"Take 6" (2025)	"Bugie" (2026)

Music video
- "Take 6" on YouTube

"Take 6" is a song by Italian rapper Shiva, released on 25 November 2025 by Milano Ovest and Sony Music. Co-written and produced by Drillionaire, the track continues the artist's "Take" series—which began in 2020 with "Take 1"—and serves as the sixth installment, following the 2024 single "Take 5".

The song topped the FIMI singles chart.

== Music video ==
The music video for "Take 6", directed by Late Milk, was released on the same day via Shiva's YouTube channel.

== Charts ==
Weekly chart performance for "Take 6"
Chart (2025)	Peak position
Italy (FIMI)	1

== Certifications ==
Region	Certification	Certified units/sales
Italy (FIMI)	Gold	100,000^{‡}
^{‡} Sales+streaming figures based on certification alone.
