= Artie 5ive =

Italian singer and rapper (born 2000)

- Also known as: La Rue La Vrai
- Born: Ivan Arturo Barioli; 28 August 2000 (age 26); Milan, Lombardia, Italy
- Genres: Hip hop; drill; gangsta rap
- Occupations: Rapper
- Instrument: Vocals
- Years active: 2020–present
- Labels: Trenches; ADA; Warner Music Italy

Ivan Arturo Barioli (born 28 August 2000), known professionally as Artie 5ive, is an Italian rapper of Sierra Leonean origins.

== Biography ==
Artie 5ive made his debut in the recording industry with the studio album Aspettando la bella vita, released in July 2023, which reached 8th position on the FIMI Albums Chart and which sold over 50,000 units, being certified platinum by the Federazione Industria Musicale Italiana. The LP contains "Anelli e collane" (featuring Anna), "Top G" and the track of the same name ("ALBV"), all three certified platinum for 100,000 units sold.

The single "Cadillac", released in October 2023, received double platinum and it marked Barioli's first number one in the FIMI Top Singles chart. Two months later the album Motivation 4 the Streetz was published, in collaboration with Rondodasosa, which finished in 4th place in the rankings, certified gold by FIMI and promoted by the tour of the same name. The project includes the songs "Hoodrich" and "Boulevard", both certified gold.

"I Love It", a duet with Anna taken from the latter's album Vera Baddie (2024), became the artist's third entry into the Italian top ten and certified platinum.

== Discography ==
=== Studio albums ===
Title	Album details	Peak chart positions	Certifications
Title	Album details	ITA	Certifications
La bellavita	Released: 28 March 2025; Label: Warner; Format: CD, LP, digital download, streaming	1	FIMI: 4× Platinum

=== Collaborative albums ===
Title	Album details	Peak chart positions	Certifications
Title	Album details	ITA	Certifications
Motivation 4 the Streetz (with Rondodasosa)	Released: 8 December 2023; Label: Warner; Format: CD, LP, digital download, streaming	4	FIMI: Gold

=== Mixtapes ===
Title	Album details	Peak chart positions	Certifications
Title	Album details	ITA	Certifications
Aspettando la bellavita	Released: 5 May 2023; Label: Warner; Format: CD, digital download, streaming	8	FIMI: 2× Platinum

=== Singles ===
==== As lead artist ====
Title	Year	Peak chart positions	Certifications	Album
Title	Year	ITA	Certifications	Album
"Finchè siamo sbronzi"	2020	—		Non-album singles
"Red Bandana"	2020	—		Non-album singles
"Calabasas" (featuring Sneccio)	2020	—		Non-album singles
"Così parlo Artie 5ive"	2021	—		Non-album singles
"Fiaccola"	2022	—		Non-album singles
"Murder Dance"	2022	—		Non-album singles
"Ready Rock"	2022	—		Non-album singles
"Paramedici"	2022	—		Non-album singles
"Tookie Williams"	2022	—		Non-album singles
"2 minuti"	2023	—		Non-album singles
"ALBV"	2023	77	FIMI: Gold	Non-album singles
"Eyes of the Tiger" (featuring Rondodasosa)	2023	—		Aspettando la bellavita
"Top G" (featuring Sacky)	2023	34	FIMI: Platinum	Aspettando la bellavita
"Finchè non arriva la bellavita"	2023	—		Aspettando la bellavita (Before and After)
"Red&Blue" (with Rondodasosa)	2023	55		Motivation 4 the Streets
"Guru del business" (with Rondodasosa)	2023	88		Motivation 4 the Streets
"Santi qua" (featuring Ddusi)	2024	—		Non-album single
"00"	2024	7	FIMI: Platinum	La bellavita
"Ad maiora"	2024	—		Non-album single
"Milano Testarossa" (featuring Guè)	2024	20	FIMI: Platinum	La bellavita
"Per sempre" (with Bresh)	2024	41		Non-album single
"Bambola" (featuring Niky Savage)	2024	9	FIMI: Gold	La bellavita
"Pietà" (featuring Kid Yugi)	2025	10	FIMI: Gold	La bellavita
"Man of the Year"	2026	35		Non-album singles
"Swag Music"	2026	3	FIMI: Gold	Non-album singles
"Bop Bop"	2026	29		Non-album singles

==== As featured artist ====
Title	Year	Peak chart positions	Certifications	Album
Title	Year	ITA	Certifications	Album
"DEM" (Kid Yugi featuring Tony Boy and Artie 5ive)	2022	—	FIMI: Gold	The Globe
"Rocket" (Vale Pain featuring Artie 5ive)	2023	55	FIMI: Gold	Estate in città
"Cadillac" (Boro featuring Artie 5ive and Andry the Hitmaker)	2023	1	FIMI: 2× Platinum	Bendicion
"Paninaro" (Digital Astro featuring Artie 5ive and Tony Boy)	2023	29	FIMI: Gold	Astro Deluxe
"Los diablos" (Sacky featuring Artie 5ive and 167 Gang)	2024	—		Balordo (Deluxe)
"Non la sopporto" (Papa V featuring Artie 5ive)	2024	—		Trap fatta bene

=== Guest appearances ===
Title	Year	Other artist(s)	Album
"Porto il commerciale"	2023	Kid Yugi, The Night Skinny	Quarto di bue
"Victoria"	2023	Tony Boy	Umile (Deluxe)
"Puntino"	2023	Sadturs & Kiid	No Regular Music
"Le bambine fanno oh"	2023	Sadturs & Kiid, Nerissima Serpe, Papa V, Anna	No Regular Music
"Clap clap"	2023	Sadturs & Kiid, Niky Savage	No Regular Music
"Chosen One"	2023	Sadturs & Kiid, Lito, Digital Astro	No Regular Music
"Fortuna"	2024	Tony Boy	Nostalgia (export)
"Capra a tre teste"	2024	Kid Yugi, Tony Boy	I nomi del diavolo
"La cassa"	2024	Capo Plaza	Ferite
"I Love It"	2024	Anna	Vera Baddie
"Weekend"	2024	Sadturs & Kiid, Ghali	No Regular Music (Deluxe)
"1234 Posse"	2024	Sadturs & Kiid with various artists	No Regular Music (Deluxe)
"Casanova"	2024	Lazza	Locura
"Palm Angels"	2024	Vale Lambo	Lamborghini a via Marina
"Numero 5"	2024	The Night Skinny	Containers
"Nella trap"	2024	The Night Skinny, Capo Plaza, Tony Effe	Containers
"True Story"	2024	The Night Skinny, Noyz Narcos, Papa V	Containers
"Gomorra"	2024	167 Gang	In piazza ci muori
"Per te lascio il party"	2024	Tony Boy	Going Hard 3
"Akrapovič"	2025	Guè	Tropico del Capricorno
"Samsung"	2025	Papa V, Nerissima Serpe, Fritu	Mafia Slime 2
"Money on My Mind"	2025	Jake La Furia, Rose Villain	Fame
"Money"	2026	Nemzzz	Locked In (Euroluxe)
