= BBE (song) =

Single by Anna featuring Lazza

from the album Vera Baddie
- Released: 10 May 2024
- Genre: Trap
- Length: 3:18
- Label: EMI; Universal
- Songwriters: Anna Pepe; Jacopo Lazzarini; Dylan Hyde; Francesco Turolla; Nicolò Pucciarmati; Lorenzo Bassotti
- Producers: Young Miles; SadTurs; Kiid

Anna singles chronology
"Vieni dalla baddie" (2024)	"BBE" (2024)	"30°C" (2024)

Lazza singles chronology
"100 messaggi" (2024)	"BBE" (2024)	"Exit" (2024)

Music video
- "BBE" on YouTube

"BBE" (acronym for "Best Bitch Ever") is a song by Italian rapper Anna with featured vocals by Italian rapper Lazza. It was produced by Young Miles, SadTurs and Kiid, and released by EMI and Universal on 10 May 2024 as the third single from the artist's debut studio album, Vera Baddie.

The song peaked at number 4 on the Italian singles chart and was certified double platinum in Italy.

== Music video ==
The music video for the song was directed by Giammarco Boscariol and released on YouTube on 15 May 2024.

== Charts ==
=== Weekly charts ===
Weekly chart performance for "BBE"
Chart (2024)	Peak position
Italy (FIMI)	4

=== Year-end charts ===
Year-end chart performance for "BBE"
Chart (2024)	Position
Italy (FIMI)	26

== Certifications ==
Region	Certification	Certified units/sales
Italy (FIMI)	2× Platinum	400,000^{‡}
^{‡} Sales+streaming figures based on certification alone.
