= Drippin' in Milano =

Single by Anna
- Released: 16 July 2021
- Genre: Trap
- Length: 2:39
- Label: EMI
- Songwriters: Anna Pepe; Nicolò Pucciarmati; Marco Asara
- Producer: Young Miles

Anna singles chronology
"Squeeze #1" (2021)	"Drippin' in Milano" (2021)	"Balaklub: What Up" (2021)

Music video
- "Drippin' in Milano" on YouTube

"Drippin' in Milano" is a song by Italian rapper Anna. It was produced by Young Miles, and released by EMI on 16 July 2021.

The song peaked at number 24 on the Italian singles chart and was certified platinum in Italy.

== Music video ==
The music video for the song was directed by Andrea Folino and released on YouTube on 28 July 2021. It was shot in a villa on Lake Como.

== Charts ==
Weekly chart performance for "Drippin' in Milano"
Chart (2021)	Peak position
Italy (FIMI)	24
Italy Airplay (EarOne)	77

== Certifications ==
Region	Certification	Certified units/sales
Italy (FIMI)	Platinum	70,000^{‡}
^{‡} Sales+streaming figures based on certification alone.
