= Vetri neri =

2023 song by Ava featuring Anna and Capo Plaza

Single by Ava featuring Anna and Capo Plaza

from the EP Ok Ava
- Released: 19 May 2023
- Genre: Dance pop
- Length: 2:49
- Label: Warner
- Songwriters: Anna Pepe; Luca D'Orso; Francesco Avallone; Daniele Zanotti; Sergio Bancone; Nicolas Cavenaghi
- Producers: Ava; BLSSD

Ava singles chronology
"Dimmi che" (2023)	"Vetri neri" (2023)	"Moon" (2024)

Anna singles chronology
"Energy" (2023)	"Vetri neri" (2023)	"Everyday" (2023)

Capo Plaza singles chronology
"Arai" (2023)	"Vetri neri" (2023)	"Freddy Krueger Freestyle" (2023)

Music video
- "Vetri neri" on YouTube

"Vetri neri" (transl. Black Glass Windows) is a 2023 song by Italian music producer Ava with featured vocals by Italian rappers Anna and Capo Plaza. It was released on 19 May 2023 as the fourth single from Ava's debut extended play Ok Ava.

The song uses a sample of "Mr. Saxobeat" by Alexandra Stan. It peaked at number 2 on the Italian singles chart and was certified six platinums in Italy. The track was also the most streamed single in Italy during the summer of 2023 on Spotify.

== Music video ==
A visual music video of "Vetri neri", directed by Late Milk, was released on 14 June 2023 via Ava's YouTube channel.

== Charts ==
=== Weekly charts ===
Weekly chart performance for "Vetri neri"
Chart (2023)	Peak position
Italy (FIMI)	2
Italy Airplay (EarOne)	45

=== Year-end charts ===
2023 year-end chart performance for "Vetri neri"
Chart (2023)	Position
Italy (FIMI)	6

2024 year-end chart performance for "Vetri neri"
Chart (2024)	Position
Italy (FIMI)	48

== Certifications ==
Certifications for "Vetri neri"
Region	Certification	Certified units/sales
Italy (FIMI)	6× Platinum	600,000^{‡}
^{‡} Sales+streaming figures based on certification alone.
