= Syrup (song) =

Single by Shiva

from the album Milano Angels
- Released: 14 September 2023
- Length: 3:09
- Label: Sony
- Songwriter: Shiva
- Producers: Finesse; Zazu; Seventeens

Shiva singles chronology
"Caramelo" (2023)	"Syrup" (2023)	"Everyday" (2023)

Music video
- "Syrup" on YouTube

"Syrup" is a song by Italian rapper Shiva. It was released on 14 September 2023 by Sony Music as the lead single for the artist's sixth studio album Milano Angels.

The song topped the FIMI singles chart.

== Music video ==
The music video for "Syrup", directed by Ivano Robustellini, was released on the same day via Shiva's YouTube channel.

== Charts ==
Weekly chart performance for "Syrup"
Chart (2023)	Peak position
Italy (FIMI)	1

== Certifications ==
Certification for "Syrup"
Region	Certification	Certified units/sales
Italy (FIMI)	Platinum	100,000^{‡}
^{‡} Sales+streaming figures based on certification alone.
