= Désolée =

Single by Anna
- Released: 13 June 2025
- Genre: Reggaeton
- Length: 2:39
- Label: EMI
- Songwriters: Anna Pepe; Francesco Turolla; Lorenzo Bassotti; Nicolò Pucciarmati
- Producer: Young Miles

Anna singles chronology
"Una tipa come me" (2025)	"Désolée" (2025)	"Push It" (2026)

Music video
- "Désolée" on YouTube

"Désolée" (French: I'm sorry) is a song by Italian rapper Anna. It was produced by Young Miles and released by EMI on 13 June 2025.

The song peaked at number 1 on the Italian singles chart.

== Live performances ==
The song was performed live in preview at the Tim Summer Hits in Rome, hosted by Andrea Delogu and Carlo Conti.

== Music video ==
The music video for the song was directed by Francesco Bartoli Avveduti and released on YouTube on 18 July 2025.

== Charts ==
=== Weekly charts ===
Weekly chart performance for "Désolée"
Chart (2025)	Peak position
Italy (FIMI)	1
Italy Airplay (EarOne)	7

=== Year-end charts ===
Year-end chart performance for "Désolée"
Chart (2025)	Position
Italy (FIMI)	20

== Certifications ==
Region	Certification	Certified units/sales
Italy (FIMI)	Platinum	200,000^{‡}
^{‡} Sales+streaming figures based on certification alone.
