= Tony Boy =

- Born: Antonio Hueber; 26 September 1999 (age 27); Padua, Italy
- Genres: Hip hop; trap; emo rap; mumble rap; cloud rap; conscious hip hop
- Occupation: Rapper
- Years active: 2018–present
- Labels: 22 Srl; Warner Music Italy

Antonio Hueber (born 14 September 1999), better known as Tony Boy, is an Italian rapper.

== Biography ==
=== Beginnings and the two Going Hard (2018–2021) ===
Antonio Hueber was born and raised in Padua. He approached music from an early age, becoming passionate about pop punk and later hip-hop influenced by his brother. He began writing his first rap songs at the age of 15.

He arrived on Spotify in 2018 with his single "Adesso", followed by others such as "Sogni", "Lontano", "Futuro" and "Suite". He became known to the public in June 2019, with the release of his first EP Non c'è futuro entirely produced by Wairaki, and featuring rapper Dium.

In 2020 he released the singles "Champagne", in collaboration with Mr.Rizzus, "1999" and "Jungla". In June he collaborated with Nashley on "Dipendenza", contained in the latter's new EP, while he published "Glimpty" with Dutch Nazari in July and "Gas" in September, tracks from Going Hard, his official debut studio album, released in October 2020.

In 2021 he released his second studio album, the official sequel to the first, Going Hard 2. The collaboration with Wairaki, which produced almost all the artist's songs, greatly influenced the creation of his melodic trap style with influences from overseas such as Polo G and Lil Durk. The fulcrum of Going Hard 2 were the life stories of a twenty-year-old from the provinces, who found a way out of a flat life in rap and music. The album features collaborations from artists such as Touché, Slings, Yamba and Jamil.

=== Umile, Nostalgia (export) and Going Hard 3 (2022–2024) ===
In 2022 Tony Boy became better known, collaborating on singles such as "Ronaldinho" by Digital Astro and "DEM" by Kid Yugi together with Artie 5ive.

During 2023 he released the singles Hot, Progressi and Diretto al Top, taken from his third album Umile, released on July 7, 2023, which featured rappers Artie 5ive, Shiva, Vale Pain, Kid Yugi, Frah Quintale, Nerissima Serpe and Digital Astro. On October 20th, a deluxe version of Umile was released, containing five bonus tracks, which allowed the album to reach ninth position in the Italian Album Charts. The album was subsequently certified platinum.

He later participated in the singles "Rock'n Roll" by Sick Luke, "Prova Del 9" by DrefGold, "Paninaro" by Astro featuring Artie 5ive and "Moon" by Ava featuring Capo Plaza, which reached the top of the Italian Singles Chart.

On December 22, 2023 he released his second EP Export, which contained seven songs later included in his fourth studio album Nostalgia (export), released on February 23, 2024 and containing fourteen songs and only one featuring, Artie 5ive on the title "Fortuna". The album debuted at the top of the Italian album charts and was certified gold.

In the following months of 2024 he released the singles "Leanin'", "Respiro", "Il tempo cura", "Cerchio" and "Etc.", the latter in collaboration with American rapper Nardo Wick, and on October 29 he released on his YouTube channel a performance of the Acoustic versions of two unreleased songs at the Palazzo Visconti. The five singles and two tracks were later included on his fifth album Going Hard 3, released on December 6. The album featured rappers Kid Yugi, Shiva, Frah Quintale, Capo Plaza, Anna, Artie 5ive and Nardo Wick, while the productions were handled, among others, by Wairaki, Kiid, SadTurs and Finesse.

=== 2025: Uforia ===
In the first months of 2025 he released the singles "Wet" (featuring Glocky), "Uragano", "Isolato" and "Step" (featuring Lazza), all of which anticipated the release of his fifth studio album Uforia.

He also appeared as a featured artist on "A casa" by Boro, "Ayahuasca" by Simba La Rue and "Anno fantastico" by Luchè.

On 27 June 2025 he released Uforia, his third studio album, which featured Astro, Guè, Glocky, Kevin Mopao, Lazza, Simba La Rue, Shiva, and Thasup.

=== 2026: Trauma and Cura ===
After the success of his third studio album Uforia, Tony Boy surprise-released his studio album Trauma on 2 January 2026. The album was released through Atlantic Records Italy and Warner Music Italy and contains thirteen songs. The project marked a change in style, as it moved away from trap music and focused more on personal stories and past challenges. It also talked about the stress that came with being famous and successful. The album received positive reviews from music critics, who complimented its lyrics and how everything fit together. It started near the top of the album charts and had millions of plays in the first week.

In November 2026 he released another project called Cura, again released through Atlantic and Warner Music Italy. Cura was meant to follow the ideas from Trauma and offer a way to deal with the darkness. It examined themes like getting better, understanding oneself, and finding peace and healing through art. During this time Tony Boy endeavoured to be seen as a storyteller in the modern Italian rap scene.

== Discography ==
=== Studio albums ===
- Umile (2023)
- Nostalgia (export) (2024)
- Uforia (2025) – No. 1 Italy
- Trauma (2026)

=== EPs ===
- Non c'è futuro (2019)
- Export (2023)

=== Mixtapes ===
- Going Hard (2020)
- Going Hard 2 (2021)
- Going Hard 3 (2024)
