= Boro (rapper) =

- Also known as: Boro Boro
- Born: Federico Orecchia; 30 May 1996 (age 29); Turin, Piedmont, Italy
- Occupations: Rapper; singer
- Years active: 2017–present
- Labels: Universal

Federico Orecchia (born 30 May 1996), known professionally as Boro, is an Italian rapper and singer.

== Career ==
After sharing his freestyles on YouTube, Orecchia released his debut single "Rapper gamberetti" in 2017 under the stage name Boro Boro.

On 21 September 2018, he released the single "Money Rain", certified gold with over 25,000 units sold nationwide. In the same year, he took part in the twelfth season of the talent show X Factor, but was eliminated during the bootcamp phase, where he performed his third single, "Trapper".

On 6 June 2019, Boro released the single "Lento", featuring rapper MamboLosco and produced by Don Joe; the track was certified double platinum. On 10 April 2020, he released "Nena" with Geolier, produced by Andry the Hitmaker. His debut studio album, Caldo, recorded with MamboLosco, was released on 3 July 2020 and debuted at number 4 on the FIMI Albums Chart.

In 2023, he changed his stage name to Boro. On 22 September 2023, he released the single "Cadillac" in collaboration with rapper Artie 5ive, which reached number one on the FIMI Singles Chart and was certified double platinum. His first solo album, Bendicion, was released on 18 January 2024, followed by Tello on 28 November 2025.

== Discography ==
=== Studio albums ===
Title	EP details	Peak chart positions
Title	EP details	ITA
Caldo (with MamboLosco)	Released: 3 July 2020; Label: Universal	4
Bendicion	Released: 18 January 2024; Label: Universal	17
Tello	Released: 28 November 2025; Label: Universal	—
"—" denotes an item that did not chart in that country.
