= Simba La Rue =

Tunisian-born Italian rapper

- Born: Mohamed Lamine Saida; 17 May 2002 (age 24); Tunis, Tunisia
- Occupation: Rapper
- Years active: 2020–present

Mohamed Lamine Saida (born 29 April 2002), known professionally as Simba La Rue, is a Tunisian-born Italian rapper.

He made his debut in 2020 with the single "Sacoche", together with Baby Gang, and released his first EP, Crimi, on 17 May 2022. His first studio album, Tunnel, was released on 5 January 2024, and was a commercial success, reaching number one on the FIMI albums chart and being certified double platinum. In 2025, he topped the FIMI singles chart with "Ayahuasca", featuring Tony Boy.

== Discography ==
=== Studio albums ===
List of albums, with selected details
Title	Details	Peak chart positions	Certifications
Title	Details	ITA	Certifications
Tunnel	Released: 5 January 2024; Label: No Parla Tanto, Warner	1	FIMI: 3× Platinum

=== EPs ===
List of EPs, with selected details
Title	Details	Peak chart positions	Certifications
Title	Details	ITA	Certifications
Crimi	Released: 17 May 2022; Label: No Parla Tanto, Tipo Merda, Warner	16	FIMI: Platinum
