= Ava (record producer) =

Musical artist (born 1996)

- Born: Francesco Avallone; 1996 (age 29–30); Naples, Campania, Italy
- Occupations: Record producer; beatmaker; DJ
- Years active: 2016–present
- Labels: Atlantic; Warner

Francesco Avallone (born 1996), known professionally as Ava, is an Italian record producer, DJ, and beatmaker.

== Life and career ==
Avallone was born in Naples in 1996. He started playing drums but then developed a passion for digital production, using sequencers and DAWs.

In 2011, he moved to Salerno, where he met Luca d'Orso, aka Capo Plaza, with whom he formed a collaboration in rap—Ava as a beatmaker and Plaza as a freestyler. In 2016, they signed a contract with Sto Records, owned by Ghali. After some singles, in 2018 he produced Capo Plaza's album 20, including the hit single "Giovane fuoriclasse", which achieved great success and platinum certifications. Subsequently, Ava accompanied Plaza on tour and also started a career as a DJ in Italian clubs.

In 2019, Ava signed with Warner/Atlantic Records. Some of his early singles include "Holly & Benji" (2019) and "Tête" (2022), the latter created with Medy and VillaBanks. On 19 May 2023, he released the song "Vetri neri", featuring Plaza and Anna, which peaked at number two on the FIMI singles chart and was certified sextuple platinum. The track was also the most streamed single in Italy during the 2023 summer on Spotify. On 21 July 2023, he released his debut EP, Ok Ava.

Ava reached the top of the Italian chart in 2024, with the song "Moon", featuring Plaza and Tony Boy.

== Discography ==
=== Extended plays ===
Title	EP details	Peak chart positions
Title	EP details	ITA
Ok Ava	Released: 21 July 2023; Label: Warner	—
"—" denotes an item that did not chart in that country.

=== Singles ===
As lead artist

Single	Year	Peak chart positions	Certifications	Album or EP
Single	Year	ITA	Certifications	Album or EP
"Holly & Benji" (featuring Capo Plaza and Shiva)	2019	5	FIMI: Gold	Ok Ava
"Tête" (featuring Medy and VillaBanks)	2022	17	FIMI: 3× Platinum	Ok Ava
"Dimmi che" (featuring Bresh and Neima Ezza)	2023	68		Ok Ava
"Vetri neri" (featuring Anna and Capo Plaza)	2023	2	FIMI: 6× Platinum	Ok Ava
"Moon" (featuring Capo Plaza and Tony Boy)	2024	1	FIMI: Gold	Non-album singles
"Bacio di Giuda" (featuring VillaBanks and Mida)	2024	14	FIMI: Platinum	Non-album singles

As featured artist

Title	Year	Peak chart positions	Certifications	Album
Title	Year	ITA	Certifications	Album
"Bad Boy" (Finesse featuring Shiva, Capo Plaza and Ava)	2024	14	FIMI: Gold	Non-album single
