= Capo Plaza =

Italian rapper (born 1998)

- Born: Luca D'Orso; 20 April 1998 (age 28); Salerno, Campania, Italy
- Genres: Hip hop; trap
- Occupations: Rapper
- Years active: 2013–present
- Labels: Plaza; Atlantic; Warner Music Italy

Luca D'Orso (born 20 April 1998), known professionally as Capo Plaza, is an Italian rapper. He has achieved three number one albums and four number one singles in Italy.

== Early life ==
D'Orso was born on 20 April 1998 in Salerno, Italy to an accountant mother and an office employee father. He grew up in the eastern suburbs of the city, in the neighborhood of Pastena. At the age of nine, D'Orso watched the music video for "Stronger" by Kanye West, which inspired him to become a rapper. In an interview with Vanity Fair, D'Orso revealed that he was also motivated to ask his uncle to give him a CD "with all the rap songs of the moment". The CD featured artists such as Sean Paul, Jay-Z, and Lil Wayne. D'Orso began writing his first lyrics in 2011, at the age of 13.

== Career ==
=== 2013–2017: Beginnings ===
D'Orso began posting music on his YouTube channel in 2013 under the pseudonym Capo Plaza, beginning with the song "Sto giù". The following year he travelled to Milan, where he recorded a collaboration with Sfera Ebbasta.

In 2016 he released the album Sulamente nuje in collaboration with the rapper Peppe Soks. At the end of the following year he signed to Sto Records, a label owned by Ghali, which allowed him to gain popularity with his single "Allenamento #2". He subsequently released the singles "Giovane fuoriclasse" and "Non cambierò mai", which gained him attention in the Italian trap scene.

=== 2018-2020: 20 ===
In 2018, his first official album, 20, produced entirely by D'Orso's producer Ava, reached the top of the FIMI Albums Chart. The album produced the number-one single "Non cambierò mai" and the song "Tesla", the latter created in collaboration with Sfera Ebbasta and DrefGold.

The success of the album was reinforced by the first place chart standing of the singles "Non cambierò mai" and the song "Tesla", the latter created in collaboration with Sfera Ebbasta and DrefGold. On 30 November 2018, Capo Plaza released a deluxe edition of the album 20, which features an international artist, Ninho. The album reached number one in Italy and sold over 250,000 copies. It remained among the 100 most-streamed albums in Italy until 2022.

In 2019, Capo Plaza appeared on the song "Look Back at It" by A Boogie wit da Hoodie, which made him popular abroad. In 2019, the rapper released standalone singles "So cosa fare" and "Ho fatto strada", and he appeared on the remix of "Pookie" by Aya Nakamura, as well as the single "Holly & Benji" together with Ava and Shiva. In 2020, he participated in the remix of Fuego del calor by producer Scott Storch together with Ozuna and Tyga.

=== 2021-2022: Plaza and Hustle Mixtape ===
On 22 January 2021, Capo Plaza released his second album Plaza, preceded by the release of the singles "Envidioso" with Morad and "Allenamento 4", which reached the top first-place position in the Top Singles chart. The album, consisting of sixteen tracks, features collaborations with other artists, including Gunna, Sfera Ebbasta, Lil Tjay, A Boogie wit da Hoodie and Luciano. The foundations of the project were entrusted to Ava and Mojobeatz. Capo Plaza also releases a deluxe edition of this album featuring Aya Nakamura and Tion Wayne.

On 3 June 2022, the rapper released the mixtape Hustle Mixtape, consisting of twelve tracks, including the singles "Goyard" and "Capri Sun".

=== 2023-2024: Collaborations and Ferite ===
In the summer of 2023, D'Orso reached the position of second in the Top Singles chart because of the single Vetri neri. The song was done in collaboration with Ava and Anna. In 2023, D'Orso released singles "Freddy Krueger Freestyle" and "Nato per questo", with the latter track receiving certified gold status by FIMI. In 2024, he participated in Ava's single, "Moon", together with Tony Boy. He subsequently released the single "Acqua passa".

On 3 May 2024, Capo Plaza release his third studio album Ferite. The album reached the first position in the FIMI Album chart. It features collaborations with Anna, Lazza, Tedua, Tony Boy, Annalisa and Mahmood. He subsequently released the single made together with Takagi & Ketra "Fino all'alba". Finally, together with Shiva, he released the single "Bad Boy", produced by Finesse.

=== 2025-present: Hustle Mixtape Vol. 2 and 4U EP ===
On 31 October 2025, D'Orso released Hustle Mixtape Vol. 2. The rapper subsequently announced an instore tour for the album in Italy. The album became a "chart-topping hit", directly entering into Italy's Spotify Top 50 and debuting at No. 3 on the Global Top Albums Debut chart just hours after its release. The album includes multiple collarobations from other Italian artists such as Nerissima Serpe, Papa V, Caio Luccas, Bresh, Tony Boy, and Madame. The album is described as being a powerful and direct return to the rapper's roots while also affirming his deep connection with the history of Italian traps—doing so for a second time, as this album is a sequel to the first Hustle Mixtape. The project contains fifteen tracks, which feature several of the above collaborations: Papa V and Nerissima Serpe in "Floyd Mayweather", Tony Boy in "Cup + ghiaccio", Caio Luccas in "Tudo bem", Tony Effe and Bresh in "Non basta mai".

On 32 January 2026, the rapper released the single "Resta ancora un po'", which preceded the release of his first EP entitled 4U EP. On 13 February 2026, the rapper released 4U EP. In this EP, D'Orso temporarily abandons the rawer music found in the two Hustle Mixtape albums and instead explores more intimate and sincere styles. This is an artistic evolution that addresses profound themes such as maturity and personal redemption, confirming further growth of Capo Plaza. The project is made up of seven tracks, all produced by Ava and Marramvsic, one of which was co-produced with Finesse and one with the participation of Achille Lauro.

== Discography ==
=== Studio albums ===
List of studio albums, with selected details and chart positions
Title	Album details	Peak chart positions		Certifications
Title	Album details	ITA	SWI	Certifications
Sulamente nuje (with Peppe Soks)	Released: 10 June 2016; Label: Quadraro Basement; Formats: Digital download, streaming	—	—	
20	Released: 20 April 2018; Label: Sto, Atlantic, Warner; Formats: CD, 2×LP, digital download, streaming	1	25	FIMI: 6× Platinum
Plaza	Released: 22 January 2021; Label: Atlantic, Warner, Plaza; Formats: CD, 2×LP, digital download, streaming	1	5	FIMI: 4× Platinum
Ferite	Released: 3 May 2024; Label: Atlantic, Warner, Plaza; Formats: CD, 2×LP, digital download, streaming	1	4	FIMI: 4× Platinum

=== Mixtapes ===
List of mixtapes, with selected details and chart positions
Title	Album details	Peak chart positions		Certifications
Title	Album details	ITA	SWI	Certifications
Hustle Mixtape	Released: 10 June 2022; Label: Plaza, Warner, Atlantic; Formats: CD, LP, digital download, streaming	2	25	FIMI: 2× Platinum
Hustle Mixtape Vol. 2	Released: 31 October 2025; Label: Plaza, Warner, Atlantic; Formats: Digital download, streaming	2	30	FIMI: Platinum

=== EPs ===
List of EPs, with selected details and chart positions
Title	Album details	Peak chart positions		Certifications
Title	Album details	ITA	SWI	Certifications
4U EP	Released: 13 February 2026; Label: Plaza, Warner, Atlantic; Formats: CD, LP, digital download, streaming	1	—	
