= Anna (rapper) =

Italian rapper (born 2003)

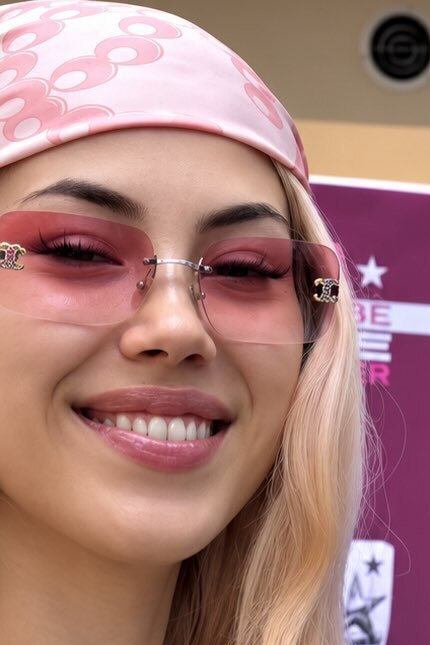
- Anna in July 2026

Background information
- Born: Anna Pepe; 15 August 2003 (age 23); La Spezia, Italy
- Genres: Hip hop; trap; pop
- Occupations: Rapper; songwriter
- Instruments: Vocals; piano
- Works: Discography
- Years active: 2018–present
- Labels: Virgin; EMI

Anna Pepe (born 15 August 2003), known professionally by the mononym Anna, is an Italian rapper.

== Early life ==
She was born in La Spezia, in Liguria, Italy. Her father is a DJ and her mother a sculptor. In 2020, she became the youngest artist to top the Italian singles chart with "Bando", her debut single.

== Career ==
=== 2018–2020: Early years ===
In 2018, Anna started to post freestyle rap videos on Instagram, before collaborating on the songs "24/7" and "Holidays" with the rapper Anis. In March 2019, she published the song "Baby" on Instagram and YouTube. Following this, she released the single "Bando" on various music streaming platforms. However, after two weeks it was removed for copyright infringement, due to the sampling of a beat by French music producer Soulker. At the start of 2020, Anna signed a contract with Virgin Records through which "Bando" was republished on 31 January, after having secured the usage rights from Soulker. The song was sent to Italian radio on 21 February 2020.

=== 2020–2021: Popularity with "Bando" and stand-alone singles ===
At the end of February 2020, "Bando" reached number one on the Italian singles chart, remaining at the top for three consecutive weeks and making Anna the youngest artist to top the chart. The single also topped the Italian Spotify, iTunes and Shazam charts. "Bando" also received international attention, with adds to official Spotify playlists and radio play in countries including France and the United States. In the former country, it placed at number 92 on the singles chart.

On 24 April 2020, an official remix of "Bando" was released featuring the Italian rappers Gemitaiz and MadMan. In 2023, the track was included in the soundtrack of the film Fast X. On 15 May 2020, another remix of "Bando" was released with the German rapper Maxwell, reaching number 80 in Germany and number 70 in Switzerland. In the same month, Anna was featured on the song "Biberon" by Dark Polo Gang, along with rapper DrefGold, and on the remix of "Hasta la vista" by Ghali.

On 7 October 2020, Anna released her second single "Bla Bla" with the rapper Guè. It peaked at number 45 on the Italian singles chart. On 5 November 2020, she released "Fast", with production from Young Miles. The single "Squeeze 1" was released on 8 July 2021, followed by "Drippin' in Milano" a week later.

=== 2022–2023: Lista 47 ===
In 2022, Anna returned with the singles "3 di cuori" with Lazza, and "Ma Jolie" with Medy. On 3 June 2022, she released the single "Gasolina" produced by Drillionaire and Young Miles. These singles were later featured on her debut EP Lista 47, which was certified gold by FIMI.

In 2023, Anna was featured on the track "Cookies n' Cream" with Guè and Sfera Ebbasta, which debuted atop the Italian singles chart. On 23 March 2023, she released the single "Energy". On 19 May 2023, she released the single "Vetri neri" in collaboration with Ava and Capo Plaza. The track spent 11 weeks at number two on the Italian singles chart and was certified five times platinum, for sales in excess of 500,000 copies, making it her highest-selling song to date. On 13 October 2023, Anna featured alongside Geolier and Shiva on Takagi & Ketra's single "Everyday". The song discusses themes of jealous and possessiveness in a relationship, and has been described as an urban ballad, telling the same story from three different points of view. The track debuted atop the Italian singles chart, remaining there for six weeks. It was certified triple platinum in Italy for sales in excess of 300,000 copies.

=== 2024-2026: Vera Baddie and Million Dollar Babe ===
On 19 January 2024, Anna released the single "I Got It", her first release in the United States through Republic Records. A music video for the song, filmed in New York City, was released the same day. The single "BBE", an acronym of "Best Bitch Ever", was released on 9 April 2024. Featuring Lazza, it is the third collaboration between the two rappers. The interlude, "Vieni dalla baddie", was released on 18 April 2024. On 30 May 2024, she released the single "30°C", ahead of the release of her debut studio album Vera Baddie on 28 June 2024. The album's track listing was teased through a petrol station pop-up in Milan, ahead of its full announcement on 26 June.

Vera Baddie spent nine consecutive weeks atop the Italian chart, tying a record held by Laura Pausini's Primavera in anticipo since 2008 as the longest-running number one album by a female artist. The single "30°C" reached number one in its thirteenth week on the chart, making Anna the first female artist to top both the Italian album and singles chart simultaneously in 10 years. As well as the singles "BBE" and "30°C", three more tracks reached the top 10 of the Italian singles chart, despite not being released as singles: "Tt le girlz", "I Love It" and "Bikini". "Tonight" was sent to Italian radio as the album's fourth single on 20 September 2024.

In September 2024, Billboard Italia named Anna their Woman of the Year for her record-breaking success in the music industry.

On 10 July 2026, Anna released her second studio album, Million Dollar Babe. She described that this album is not about money, but about her personal growth in which she learned to value herself. The album also "explores the contradictions of success, from the concepts of 'status' and 'glory' to the emptiness, loneliness, and illusions that often accompany it. [It is] an album that celebrates perseverance, the freedom to be oneself, and the ability to transform every wound into awareness." She also stated she intends to represent Italy in Eurovision. She announced a tour for the album, set to begin on November 28, 2026 with the first location being Pesaro in the Vitrifrigo Arena.

== Musical influences ==
In an interview with Billboard Italia, Anna stated that she listens to hip hop and Italian trap. She cited Lazza, Sfera Ebbasta and FSK Satellite as influences. She also confirmed that she does not listen to other female Italian hip hop artists, preferring American artists such as Nicki Minaj.

== Discography ==
- Vera Baddie (2024)
- Million Dollar Babe (2026)

== Tours ==
Headliner

- Anna Club Tour (2024)
- Vera Baddie Tour (2025)

Promotional

- Anna Live Summer Tour (2024)
- Vera Baddie Summer Tour (2025)

Opening act

- Pink Friday 2 World Tour – Nicki Minaj (2024)
