= Cecilia Fusco =

Italian opera singer (1933–2020)

- Cecilia Fusco in Rigoletto (photo with dedication)
- Born: 10 June 1933; Rome, Italy
- Died: 26 November 2020 (aged 87); Latisana, Italy
- Education: Conservatorio Santa Cecilia
- Occupation: Operatic soprano
- Years active: 1958-1980s
- Organizations: La Scala; I Virtuosi dell'opera di Roma

Maria Cecilia Fusco (10 June 1933 – 26 November 2020) was an Italian operatic soprano and voice teacher. In a long career, she appeared regularly at La Scala in Milan, and leading opera houses in Italy and abroad. Her broad repertoire included works from early Italian opera to premieres of contemporary opera.

== Life and career ==
Fusco was born in Rome and grew up there in a musical family. Her father Giovanni Fusco was a composer of film soundtracks, whose music is linked to films by Michelangelo Antonioni and Jean-Luc Godard, among others. Her mother was Adriana Dante, pianist and pupil of Alfredo Casella. Frequent guests of the Fusco family, which included Goffredo Petrassi, Franco Ferrara, Guido Turchi, Francesco Siciliani and Franco Mannino, helped the young Cecilia develop a strong musicality.

Fusco studied at the Conservatorio Santa Cecilia in Rome and won the Puccini competition of the RAI. She made her debut in 1958 at the Teatro Margherita in Genoa as Gilda in Verdi's Rigoletto. In 1960, she appeared at La Scala in Milan for the first time, as Barbarina in Mozart's Le nozze di Figaro, conducted by Herbert von Karajan. She also appeared there as Lisa in Bellini's La sonnambula, Musetta in Puccini's La bohème, and as Katja in the world premiere of Guido Turchi's Il buono soldato Svejk on 5 February 1962. Other operas at the house included Donizetti's Don Pasquale, Ariadne auf Naxos by Richard Strauss, Rossini's La scala di seta, Jacopo Napoli's Miseria e nobiltà and Handel's Serse. Un ballo in maschera, La serva padrona, Gluck's Iphigénie en Tauride, Pergolesi's Stabat Mater.

In a career to the end of the 1970s, she appeared at many Italian and foreign opera houses, including La Fenice in Venice, the Teatro Comunale di Bologna, the Teatro Lirico Giuseppe Verdi, the Teatro di San Carlo in Naples, the Teatro Massimo Vittorio Emanuele of Palermo, the Teatro Massimo Bellini of Catania, the Teatro Regio di Parma, the Teatro della Pergola of Florence, the Teatro dell'Opera di Roma, the Teatro Petruzzelli in Bari. Outside of Italy, she performed at the Liceu in Barcelona, La Monnaie of Brussels, the Cairo Opera House.

She collaborated for a long time with the ensemble I Virtuosi dell'opera di Roma directed by Renato Fasano, specialized in opera and chamber repertoire of the Italian 16th and 17th centuries with which she sang at the Expo '70 in Osaka.

She collaborated with conductors such as Igor Stravinsky, Paul Hindemith, Francesco Molinari-Pradelli, Arturo Basile, Bruno Bartoletti, Franco Capuana, Piero Bellugi, Alberto Zedda, Oliviero De Fabritiis, Franco Ferrara, Nino Sanzogno, Peter Maag, Gianandrea Gavazzeni and Claudio Abbado.

In concert, she performed at the Accademia Nazionale di Santa Cecilia and the Accademia Filarmonica Romana in Rome, at the Sagra musicale umbra, the Salle Pleyel in Paris, Carnegie Hall in New York and the Royal Albert Hall in London.

From the 1990s, she began to teach voice, at Italian conservatories including Giuseppe Tartini of Trieste, and in master classes in various locations of Friuli-Venezia Giulia, Abruzzo, Tuscany and Sicily.

Fusco died following a long illness at a hospital in Latisana. She was also diagnosed with COVID-19.

== Films ==
- 1962: L'ajo nell'imbarazzo, Donizetti, directed by Vasco Ugo Finni
- 1963: Rita, Donizetti, directed by Filippo Crivelli
