= Nazario Carlo Bellandi =

Italian composer, organist, and pianist

Nazario Carlo Bellandi (February 24, 1919 in Rome – April 20, 2010 in Rome) was an Italian music composer, organist, pianist, and harpsichordist.

== Education ==
Maestro Nazario Carlo Bellandi in 1942 obtained the Diploma in Composition at the Conservatory of St Cecilia in Rome. Two years later obtained the Diploma in Piano at the same Conservatory. In 1946 he specialized in Choral Conducting and in Film Music Composition at the Roman Academy of St Cecilia. In 1947 he got the Diploma in Gregorian Chant at the Pontifical Institute of Sacred Music. In 1948 he obtained the Diploma in Organ and Organ Composition at the Conservatory of St Cecilia. In 1949 he was awarded the Magistrum in Organ at the Pontifical Institute of Sacred Music and the specialization in Organ at the Academy Chigiana of Siena, Italy. He also specialized in Musical Paleography at the University of Bologna, Italy. He also studied at the Conservatory of Palermo and the Conservatory of Parma, Italy, during his frequent transfers. He studied with Renzo Silvestri (piano), Ferruccio Vignanelli and Fernando Germani (organ), and Alessandro Bustini (composition). He was a fellow student for several years of Carlo Maria Giulini, Bruno Maderna, Armando Renzi and Guido Turchi.

== Teaching activities ==
From 1949 to 1989/90, Maestro Bellandi taught for 40 consecutive years. For the first 25 years of teaching he held the Chair of Professor of Organ and Organ Composition at the Conservatory of Santa Cecilia in Rome, Italy. Since 1974 he was Professor of Composition at the same Conservatory. He also held the chairs Professor of the Main Organ, Harmony, and Counterpoint. He also held the Chair of Complementary Harmony and Counterpoint at the Conservatory of Naples and taught at the Institute ST Alessio in Rome. He received several nominations for teaching in Italy: piano for the Conservatory of Turin, Gregorian Chant for the Conservatory of Bologna, Harmony and Counterpoint for the conservatory in Naples, 2nd place in the national ranking of qualified Professors for the teaching of the Harpsichord and the Organ and Organ Composition for the conservatories in Cagliari and in Rome.

== Work ==
=== Works for organ (for teaching purposes) ===
The cycle for organ is in part constructed with educational intent, aimed at solving problems related to specific subjects of study of the Chair of the Organ and Organ Composition. These are collections of "Fugues for organ" for the study of organ composition, the "Musical Flowers" in the imagery of Frescobaldi, Chorales inspired by Bach, the motets for solo voice and organ, a number of preludes and fugues in various tones (among them the composition for the study of the chromatic scale), and the "24 canonical Variations " for the study and the application of the "Guide to the Canon."

=== The three sonatas for organ ===
Beyond the specific scope of teaching, there are other works aimed at contributing to the literature for the organ. These works are, among others, the three sonatas for organ and the two symphonies for choir and organ. The First Sonata is based on the "Canonical Tables" devised by the author. After the chorale, variations follow: canon on the eighth, canon on the seventh, canon on the second, canon on the sixth, canon on the fourth, canon on the fifth, canon on the third, a prelude to the fugue and finally a fugue. The Second Sonata uses musical mode as well as tonality, at times blending romantic mood with mathematical rationality. The third Sonata adopts the twelve-tone technique and serialism with unscrupulous critical rethinking, solving the alleged hypothetical atonality of the tonal system in a tonal panchromatism.

=== The Ecumenical Symphony ===
The "Ecumenical Symphony" for choir and organ is constructed on the Latin literary text and music of the Introit of the Mass of the first Advent and of the Antifona ad laude of the Ascension Domini, as well as on the German text and music of the Chorale "Our Father" by Martin Luther. The symphony is called Ecumenical because, through the specific musical language and both the Latin and German texts, it surges to a new expressive synthesis of ancient and modern sources to symbolically show the transformation of the aspects of human life into the transcendent reality and unity. The first movement, on the text of the Gregorian Advent, is in the classic form of "first movement of sonata" with equal importance of the organ and the choir. The Gregorian and the Lutheran choral themes match and merge through traditional and nontraditional harmonic procedures, such as non-tonal, modal, polytonal, twelve-tone serial, and so on. The second movement (Adagio), all performed by solo organ, draws on the Antifona of the Ascension, and culminates in a melodic-recitative meditation of variations on the chorale of the Our Father with musical themes on twelve-tone series. The third movement (Vivace) for solo organ expresses a word of contrast, and culminates in the fourth movement (Final) in the form of an organ Fugue in a twelve-tone series, yet emersed in the context of a tonal-polytonal harmonic framework. Here the choir intervenes from time to time by interpolating with the German text of the Our Father, in a mono-rhythmic harmonic form.

=== The Eucharist Symphony ===
The "Eucharist Symphony" starting from the first movement (Fugue for organ) is expressed with musical themes that recur from various technical aspects. There is a gradual process that, starting from the exaggerated and dark (even atonal) chromatism of the first two movements, is resolved in lyrical simplicity and clarity in the third movement, and leads to the triumphant and bright choral meditation in the fourth movement, to represent the mystery of a renewed humanity in the Eucharist. This symphony ends with a finale on the medieval text "Pange Lingua" in 45 variations.

=== The Fugue for Organ on the Name of BACH ===
The Fugue for organ based on the name of Bach, on the scheme B-A-C-H, is a contrapuntal study with chromatic harmony.

=== Other works for organ ===
The above list of works also includes works for organ other than those discussed so far.

== Works for choir, orchestra, piano, strings and other instruments ==
The Maestro has composed several works for different instruments apart from the organ, such as compositions for strings, quartets, sonatas for violin, piano, orchestra and soloists, etc.

Particularly noteworthy are the "Canticle of Creatures" by St Francis of Assisi Lauda and Drama, music for orchestra, soloists and choir, with text by Jacopone da Todi.

The hymn "Holy Mary, Mother of Peace" was written on express request of the Mayor of Circello, David Nava, author of the literary text, for the Feast of the emigrants in Circello Italy which takes place in early August.

=== The Rosary Music ===
The Rosary Music is the most complex of his works, from the point of views of both size and musical procedures, for choir, solo voices and organ, partly interspersed, music in instrumental choral-symphonic structures, according to the tradition of the Mysteries of the Rosary. A piece of instrumental music for solo organ precedes each mystery as an introduction to the literary texts that follow. Thereafter, there are the songs on the Latin text of the prayer of the Ave Maria, for each mystery, which are expressed in ever-changing combinations and musical procedures. Each cycle of "Mysteries" ends with a symphonic orchestra song that expresses the ideal and technical-musical synthesis of what solo voices and the organ have previously done. The general introduction to the Work includes music for soprano and organ with verses taken from Canto XXXIII of "Paradise" of Dante Alighieri's "Virgin mother daughter of your son".

== Theoretical and didactic works ==
=== The Canonical Tables ===
These tables are an original mathematical method for the composition of the technique of canons, with examples from 2 to 8 voices.

=== The Method of Study for the Organ Pedals ===
The method, in three volumes, illustrates rational and physical procedures for the acquisition in a few months of a safe and natural technique for playing pedals.

=== The Rhythm, Tritone, Sound, Word with Music towards Unity ===
This study explains in simple terms the basic mysteries of rhythm, tritone, sound, word, time and space underlying the unity of every musical composition.

== Concerts ==
At the age of seven years, Nazario Carlo Bellandi gave his first violin concerto. In particular, he was a fine scholar and performer of music by J. S. Bach. He also performed the complete works for organ by César Franck. The following list of concerts given by the Maestro has been reconstructed from the few programs found:

- Conservatory of Music St Cecilia in Rome, Italy, June 3, 1938, music by N.C. Bellandi: Lauda Drama for Soloists, Choir and Orchestra;
- Parish Basilica of Cristo Re, Rome, Italy, Organ Concert, July 4, 1963, Bach: Toccata Adagio and Fugue in C minor, Passacaglia and Franck: Pastoral, First Chorale;
- St Bernardino, L’Aquila, Italy, August 28, 1963, Bach;
- St Maria Regina Pacis, Ostia, Italy, Concert of inauguration of the organ in memory of Pope Giovanni XXIII, October 23, 1963, music by Bach;
- St Maria della Mercede, Rome, Italy, June 30, 1964, music by Bach;
- Church of Ara Coeli, Rome, Italy, May 10, 1966, music by Bach: Prelude in E b, Passacaglia, Toccata Adagio and Fugue in C Major, Chorale on the "Our Father", Fantasia and Fugue in G minor, Prelude and Fugue in D major, Triple Fugue in E b;
- Church of Ara Coeli, Rome, Italy, University Music Center, May 17, 1966, music by Bach: Sonata in E b, Sonata II in C minor, Sonata III in D minor, Sonata IV in E minor, Sonata V in C Major, Sonata VI in G Major, and conference on Aspects of the Organ Art of Bach;
- St Maria Regina Pacis, Ostia, Italy, August, 25, 27, 30, 1966, entire organ works by Franck;
- ST Francesca al Foro Romano, Rome, Italy, Comitato Romano and Artists’ Mass, May 18, 1967, music by Vivaldi, Martini, Bach;
- St John’s Co.Cathedral, Malta, Malta, March 27, 1968 music by Bach: Toccata, Adagio, Fugue in C major, Passacaglia, Bach-Vivaldi: Concert in D minor, Flor Peeters: solemn prelude, Paul Hindemith: second movement of the second Sonata, Gordon Phillips: Doric Theme, Bellandi: Fugue on the name of BACH, Cesar Franck: Great symphonic piece;
- Church of St Giacomo in Augusta, Rome, Italy, April, 5-6 1969, music by Virgilio Mortari: Missa Elegiaca;
- Church of St Giacomo in Augusta, Rome, Italy, May 11, 1969, music by Cavazzoni, Frescobaldi, Bach;
- Spiritual Concerts, Basilica of St Francesco, Rome, Italy, June 16, 1969, music by Giovanni Fusco and Cesar Auguste Franck;
- Church of St Maria della Mercede, Rome, Italy, Bach, June 30, 1970;
- Church of St Giacomo in Augusta, Rome, Italy, November 29, 1970, music by Frescobaldi, Bach;
- Parish Church of St Vittoria, Carsoli, Italy, March 28, 1971, music by Frescobaldi, Vivaldi-Bach, Franck;
- Basilica of St Flaviano, Montefiascone, Italy, August 26, 1972, organ concert - Harpsichord and Strings, Chamber Orchestra of the Baroque Academy, music by Bach;
- Parish Basilica of Cristo Re, Rome, Italy, February 25, 1973, music by Bach, Franck, Bossi;
- Basilica of Sts XII Apostoli in Roma, Italy, June 6–13, 1984, music by Vivaldi-Bach (concert in Re m. in three movements), Bellandi (I, II, and III Sonata), Bach (Passacaglia and Fugue in Do m);
- Parish Basilica of Cristo Re, Rome, Italy, October 28, 1984, music by Bach: Sonatas in Trio;
- Patriarchal Archbasilica of St Giovanni in Laterano, Rome, Italy, November 5, 1985, J.S. Bach (Prelude in E♭ Major, Passacaglia and Fugue in C minor, Toccata, Adagio and Fugue in C major, Fantasia and Fugue in G minor, Prelude and Fugue in D major, Triple Fugue in E♭ Major;
- Church of St Domenico Savio, Terracina, Italy, November 16, 1985, concert for Organ music by Bach: Prelude in E b, Passacaglia in C minor, Toccata Adagio and Fugue in C major, Chorale on the "Our Father", Fantasia and Fugue in G minor, prelude and Fugue in D major, Triple Fugue in E flat;
- Eurofestival, Camerino, Italy, Italy, August 16–30, 1997, courses of Interpretation and Advanced Music taught by N. C. Bellandi;
- Mass of the Artists, Sanctuary of St Sindone, S. Felice Circeo, Italy, October 22, 2000, music by N. C. Bellandi, Gethsemane and Ascension.

Below are some of the concerts of works composed by Nazario Carlo Bellandi:

- Patriarchal Archbasilica of St Giovanni in Laterano, Rome, Italy, June 1–8, 1982, Concerts of "The Symphoniaci" and of the "Maestri Cantori Romani", organist Arturo Sacchetti, music by N. C. Bellandi: Second Sonata for Organ in four movements;
- Patriarchal Archbasilica of St Giovanni in Laterano and Basilica Sts XII Apostoli, Rome, Italy, 3rd Festival of Sacred Music, October 12 – November 11, 1983, organist Arturo Sacchetti, music by N. C. Bellandi: Introduction to the Motet "Qui Manducat carnem meam, ei bibit sanguinem meum, in me manet, et ego in eo, dicit Dominus";
- Church of St Maria dergli Angeli, S. Felice Circeo, Italy, September 16, 1995, organist G. Piermarini, Eximia Forma Choir led by Maestro C. Piccolo, music by P. L. Palestrina and N. Carlo Bellandi (Ecumenical Symphony and Finale of the Eucharist Symphony);
- Church of St Domenico, L’Aquila, Italy, June 18, 2002, concert by G. Piermarini, music by N. C. Bellandi;
- Catholic Cathedral of Moscow, Moscow, Russia, January 7, 2012, concert by G. Piermarini, music by N. C. Bellandi: Fugue for Organ on the name of BACH.

== Organ construction ==
The Maestro built a pipe organ of three keyboards and pedals with 55 registers. He also consulted on pipe organ renovations.

== Technical and aesthetic approach ==
The technical and aesthetic approach of his works is recognized as characterized by cultural and professional freedom and independence in the research, critical knowledge and practical testing of musical processes. His musical proposal has always tended to reveal, through sounds, human and universal values of life centered in God's unity. He has repeatedly called for educational policy on music to promote a wide and effective movement to go outside of the powers of the existing private and public schools.

== List of works ==
=== Works for organ for teaching purposes ===
- Canonical Variations for Organ
- Method of Study for the Organ Pedal, Vol I and Vol II
- The Canonical Composition for Fixed Part, Guide to the Canon: Canonical 24 Variations for Organ
- School of Organ and Organ Composition: Variations, Fugues, Sonatas
- Fugues for Organ for the Study of Organ Composition
- Chorales for Organ based on Bach for the Study of Organ Composition
- Meditations on Gregorian Chants for the Study of Organ Composition (Homage to Frescobaldi)
- Three Motets for Solo Voice and Organ
- Motet for Solo Voice and Organ
- Prelude and Fugue in G Minor for Organ for the Study of the Chromatic Scale
- Prelude and Fugue for Organ in C
- Prelude and Fugue for Organ in F minor
- Fughetta

=== Works for the organ ===
- I Organ Sonata (Chorale, Variations and Canonical Fugue)
- II Organ Sonata in Four Movements
- III Organ Sonata in Four Movements
- Eucharist Symphony in Four Movements
- Ecumenical Symphony for Choir and Organ
- Fugue for Organ on the Name of BACH
- Gloria for Choir and Organ
- Offertory for Choir and Organ
- Sonata
- Fugue
- The Rose of May, for Organ, Choir and Soloists
- Mass for Four voices, Choir and Organ with Italian Text for the Proper of the Mass of Sts Apostles Peter and Paul
- Salve Regina, for Solo Contralto and Organ
- Ave Maria
- Sancta Maria
- Welcome the Newlyweds

=== Works for piano ===
- I Allegro of Sonata for Violin and Piano
- II Allegro of Sonata for Violin and Piano
- Adagio and Allegro in E b for Piano
- Sonata for Piano in One Movement
- Suite for Piano

=== Works for other instruments, choir, orchestra ===
- The Rosary in Music
- Canticle of the Creatures for Mixed Choir, Soloists, Strings and Percussion, on Text by St Francis of Assisi
- The Lament of the Madonna (Lauda Drama, Music for Orchestra, Soloists and Choir, with Text by Jacopone da Todi)
- Prelude and Fugue for Strings
- Introduction, “Mescolanze” and Fugue in C for String Quartet
- Fugue for String Quartet
- Quartet in B b for Strings
- Quartet
- Processional Hymn "Holy Mary Mother of Peace"
- "Metamorphosis": Allegro - Adagio – Recitative for Small Orchestra
- Madrigal for Five Voices
- Two Madrigals for Three Voices
- Adagio and Scherzo for Small Orchestra (Variations on a Theme by Robert Schumann)
- Missa Pro defunctis (Gregorian Mass with Accompaniment)
- Waltz
- Music for His Daughter

=== Scientific studies and essays ===
- Canonical Tables
- Aspects of Bach's Organ
- Technical and Aesthetic Analysis of Gregorian Chants
- The Tritone: Diabulus in Music, in Philosophical Magazine Montag, 1997
- Symphony in Four Movements: Rhythm, Tritone, Sound and Word, with Music towards Unity
- Topics for the Theoretical and Practical Knowledge of Music and Musical Composition
- Comments and Proposals on the Reform of the Curriculum for the Class of Organ and Organ Composition.
