= Alessandro Bustini =

Italian composer, pianist and conductor (1876–1970)

- Bustini in Buenos Aires, 1906
- Born: 24 December 1876; Rome, Italy
- Died: 3 June 1970 (aged 93) (Note: The Musicanet database gives 23 June 1970 as the date of death.); Rome, Italy
- Occupations: Composer, pianist, conductor, teacher
- Known for: Teacher of Goffredo Petrassi, Guido Turchi and Bruno Maderna; President of the Accademia Nazionale di Santa Cecilia (1952–1964)
- Spouse: Gioconda Striglia (m. 1906)
- Children: 3

Alessandro Bustini (24 December 1876 – 3 June 1970) was an Italian composer, pianist and conductor. He taught composition at the Conservatorio Santa Cecilia in Rome, where his pupils included Goffredo Petrassi, Guido Turchi and Bruno Maderna, and was president of the Accademia Nazionale di Santa Cecilia from 1952 to 1964.

== Biography ==
=== Studies ===
Born in Rome to Caterina Gessari, he was registered at birth under his mother's surname; he was later adopted by Saturnino Bustini, who married his mother in 1887, and in 1909 he was authorised to use the surname Bustini alone. He trained at the Liceo musicale di Santa Cecilia under Giovanni Sgambati (piano), Stanislao Falchi (composition) and Remigio Renzi (organ). He took his piano diploma in 1896 and completed composition and organ the following year, earning a ministerial award. While still a student he began performing in Roman private salons, and from 1899 he featured regularly in the Santa Cecilia concert programmes, sometimes at the keyboard and sometimes as the composer of the works performed.

=== Teaching ===
His teaching career at the Rome conservatory began on 2 December 1902, when a competitive examination gave him the classes in secondary piano and score reading for composition students. Ten years later he also passed the examination for harmony and counterpoint but did not take up the post. Two further appointments won by competition were likewise left unfilled: the chair of composition in Naples in 1914 and the directorship of the Florence conservatory in 1928, both declined so that he could keep teaching his students in Rome. From 1 July 1919, again by competition, he held a full professorship of piano.

His most significant post was the chair of counterpoint, fugue and composition at the Conservatorio Santa Cecilia, which he held from 1925 until the end of the 1939–40 academic year. (Note: According to the conservatory's archives, the chair was awarded to him by competition on 15 May 1926 and confirmed in 1929.) His class produced composers who went on to shape twentieth-century Italian music, among them Goffredo Petrassi, Guido Turchi, Bruno Maderna and Carlo Maria Giulini. His connection with Petrassi began by chance: Bustini overheard the teenager at the piano in the back of a music shop where he worked as a sales assistant, gave him weekly private piano lessons, and sent him to Vincenzo Di Donato and later Cesare Dobici for harmony and counterpoint; after helping him gain admission to the conservatory in 1928, he taught him composition until his graduation in the 1931–32 academic year, which Petrassi completed with top marks in every test. Petrassi dedicated his orchestral Partita (published by Ricordi in 1934) to Bustini, and wrote a profile of him in 1940. In November 1937, after examining his preparation, Bustini also took Bruno Maderna into his class, prompting the young composer's move from Milan to Rome.

After leaving his chair he joined the central administration on 1 September 1940 as a first-class central inspector in the ministry's Directorate-General of the Arts, a move he had himself sought with the backing of the Accademia di Santa Cecilia's president, Count Enrico di San Martino Valperga. The ministry had already relied on him in earlier years to review and advise on music schools in Italy and on Italian schools abroad, in Alexandria and Tunis. He was made professor emeritus in 1954.

=== Pianist and conductor ===
Bustini in a portrait from the early 1900s

Alongside his teaching, Bustini kept up a performing career. He appeared as a soloist and as pianist of the Quartetto Romano, and partnered some of the best-known instrumentalists of the day, including Pablo de Sarasate, Joseph Joachim, Eugène Ysaÿe, David Popper, Hugo Becker and Pablo Casals. These concerts, in which he often included his own pieces, took place in the Santa Cecilia academy hall and, from 1909, at the Augusteo. He also often performed with the violinist Gioconda Striglia, later his wife, for example at the Sala Costanzi in Rome in 1904 and 1906.

He took up conducting at an early age: in 1906 he travelled to Argentina with Arturo Toscanini as his first assistant for the opera season at the Teatro Colón in Buenos Aires, and later led the Rome conservatory's orchestral classes from 1914 until he gave them up in 1924. Three performances under his baton are singled out. On 14 March 1923, at a ceremony in the Pantheon in memory of King Umberto I, he presented Ildebrando Pizzetti's unaccompanied Messa di requiem; nine days later, at the Accademia Filarmonica Romana, he conducted Lorenzo Perosi's Stabat Mater. At the same venue, on 14 April 1930, he gave the Italian premiere of Joseph Haydn's Stabat Mater, having prepared its continuo part himself.

=== Institutional roles ===
He was admitted as a member of the Accademia di Santa Cecilia on 27 January 1904 and was elected its vice-president twenty-six years later, in January 1930; (Note: A letter from the Accademia's president dated 11 February 1929 reports his unanimous election at the general assembly of the previous day; Bustini's reply is dated 20 January 1930.) the following year he joined the body that ran the academy's concerts. He also directed the artistic programme of the Accademia Filarmonica Romana on two separate occasions, for five seasons in all, including that of 1922, and between 1934 and 1936 took part in running the Teatro dell'Opera di Roma.

When the Accademia was placed under a commissioner in July 1944, Bustini lost his offices. He regained them in March 1947, when the governance of the Accademia was returned to its members. (Note: The Dizionario Biografico degli Italiani gives May 1947.) On 29 November that year the Minister of Education appointed him extraordinary commissioner of the Conservatorio Santa Cecilia, replacing Gastone Rossi-Doria; he held the post until 1950.

On 9 February 1952 the Accademia Nazionale di Santa Cecilia chose him as its president, in succession to Ildebrando Pizzetti; he was later followed by Guido Guerrini. In 1952 he also founded the Accademia's periodical, Santa Cecilia, whose first issue appeared on 15 June; he was re-elected president in 1955 and in 1956 signed the appointment of Dmitri Shostakovich as an honorary academician. The central issue of his term was the lack of a concert hall: since the war the symphony seasons had been housed on a temporary basis at the Teatro Argentina. The answer was the Auditorium on Via della Conciliazione, which opened on 28 October 1958. The Accademia awarded him its medal in 1956, and in 1959 he chaired a section of the Higher Council of Public Education. Ill health led him to step down as president in March 1964, though he went on teaching.

By 1915 he was a knight of the Order of the Crown of Italy, the Order of Saints Maurice and Lazarus, the Portuguese Military Order of Christ and the Serbian Order of St. Sava, and later attained the rank of grand officer. He received the gold medal for services to education, culture and the arts, and died in Rome in 1970. His musical papers form one of the collections in the library of the Accademia Nazionale di Santa Cecilia.

=== Personal life ===
Bustini with his wife Gioconda Striglia and their daughters Elsa, Marisa and Maria Letizia, c. 1918–1919

On 23 August 1906 Bustini married the violinist Gioconda Striglia (born 1884), with whom he had already performed in concert; after the wedding she gave up her concert career. The Argentine tour with Toscanini that year also served as their honeymoon. They had three daughters: Elsa (born 1908) and the twins Maria Luisa, known as Marisa, and Maria Letizia (born 1913). The family lived in Rome on Viale Carso and spent their holidays at Santa Marinella.

== Works ==
=== Stage ===
- Maria Dulcis, opera, libretto by Edoardo Checchi, (Note: Other sources name the librettist as Eugenio Checchi.) Teatro Costanzi, Rome, 15 April 1902
- La città quadrata (1911), libretto by Fausto Salvatori, unperformed; one of three finalists in a competition held by the City of Rome
- L'incantesimo di Calandrino (1918), libretto by Fausto Salvatori, unperformed; winner of the Tofani competition of the Roman periodical Musica

=== Orchestral ===
- Symphony in G minor, for orchestra and organ (1899)
- Symphony for orchestra
- Le tentazioni, symphonic poem after four sonnets by Fausto Salvatori (1914), performed at Santa Cecilia under Bernardino Molinari in 1914 and under Luigi Mancinelli in 1916
- Marcia trionfale for orchestra

=== Sacred ===
- Missa pro defunctis ad chorum quatuor vocum inaequalium (1902), written in memory of King Victor Emmanuel II; published in Turin by Marcello Capra in 1941

=== Chamber and piano ===
- Minuetto in sol for piano, published in 1899 in La Tribuna illustrata della domenica
- Trois pièces for piano, Op. 14, published in Moscow by Jurgenson
- Piccola suite for piano (1903)
- Capriccio for violin and piano (c. 1903)
- Notturno e Capriccio
- String Quartet in G minor (1910) and String Quartet in A major (1930; published by Ricordi in 1931)
- Violin Sonata in D major (1914), winner of the competition of the periodical Musica
- Viola Sonata in G minor (1920; published by Ricordi)
- Suite scarlattiana for string quartet (1940)

=== Vocal ===
- Album di sei melodie for voice and piano (1899)
- La principessa dai capelli d'oro, a fairy tale in four ballads for voice and piano (1910)
- Le notti senza luna (1931) and Tre liriche (1934), for voice and piano
- Le stagioni, for voice and small chamber orchestra, on verses by Giuseppe Ungaretti (1940)

=== Writings and editions ===
- La sinfonia in Italia (Rome–Turin: Casa Editrice Nazionale, 1904), arguing for the Italian origins of the symphony and calling for a renewal of composition teaching in Italian conservatories
- Editions of Johann Sebastian Bach's The Well-Tempered Clavier (Rome: De Santis, 1935 and 1937) and Muzio Clementi's Gradus ad Parnassum

== Notes ==
Preceded by Ildebrando Pizzetti	President of the Accademia Nazionale di Santa Cecilia; 1952–1964	Succeeded by Guido Guerrini
