= List of compositions by Bruno Maderna =

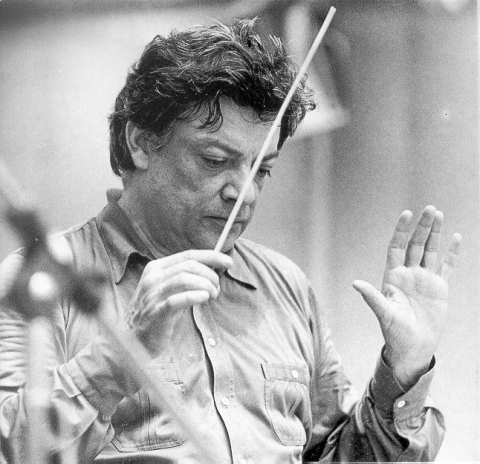
Bruno Maderna in 1963

A chronological list of compositions by Bruno Maderna. Sources:

== Compositions ==
- Alba, contralto solo, string orchestra (probably 1937–1940)
- La sera fiesolana, tenor solo, chamber ensemble (probably 1938–1939) (incomplete)
- Piccolo Concerto, piccolo solo, orchestra (1941) (incomplete)
- Concerto per pianoforte e orchestra, piano solo, orchestra (1942) (lost)
- Introduzione e passacaglia "Lauda Sion Salvatorem", orchestra (1942)
- Quartetto per archi, string quartet (before 1946)
- Concertino, probably identical with Serenata or Piccolo Concerto
- Requiem, SATB solos, choir, orchestra (probably 1945–1946) (incomplete)
- Serenata, chamber ensemble (1946)
- Liriche su Verlaine, voice and piano (1946–1947)
- Concerto per due pianoforti e strumenti, 2 pianos, 2 harps, celesta, percussion ensemble (1947–1948)
- Tre liriche greche, soprano solo, chorus, chamber ensemble (1948)
- Fantasia per due pianoforte (B.A.C.H. variations), 2 pianos (1948)
- Composizione no. 1, orchestra (1948)
- Symphonic Fragment, orchestra (1949–1950?)
- Composizione no. 2, orchestra (1950)
- Studi per "Il Processo" di Franz Kafka, speaker, soprano solo, orchestra (1950)
- Studi per il "Llanto" di Federico Garcia Lorca, tenor, flute, guitar (1950–1952?) (incomplete)
- Improvvisazione no. 1, orchestra (1951–1952)
- Musica su due dimensioni, flute, cymbal, tape (1952)
- Das eiserne zeitalter, orchestra (1952–1953?) (incomplete)
- Quattro lettere (Kranichsteiner Kammerkantate), bass or baritone solo, soprano solo, chamber ensemble (1953)
- Improvvisazione no. 2, orchestra (1953)
- Divertimento in due tempi, flute, piano (1953)
- Flötenkonzert, flute solo, orchestra (1954)
- Composizione in tre tempi, orchestra (1954)
- Serenata no. 2, chamber ensemble (1954, rev. 1957)
- Sequenze e strutture, tape (1954–1955) (lost)
- Ritratto di città, tape (1955) with Luciano Berio and Roberto Leydi
- Quartetto per archi, string quartet (1955)
- Notturno, tape (1956)
- Syntaxis, tape (1957)
- Dark Rapture Crawl, orchestra (1957) (first movement of Divertimento per orchestra by Berio and Maderna)
- Continuo, tape (1958)
- Musica su due dimensioni (second version), flute, tape (1958)
- Concerto per pianoforte e orchestra, piano solo, orchestra (1958–1959)
- Dimensioni II/Invenzione su una voce, tape (1960?)
- Serenata III, tape (1961)
- Serenata IV, flute, chamber ensemble, tape (1961)
- Honeyrêves, flute, piano (1961–1962)
- Macbeth, unknown instrumentation (probably 1962) (incomplete)
- Komposition für oboe, kammerensemble und tonband/Konzert für oboe und kammerensemble, oboe, chamber ensemble, tape (1962–1963)
- Don Perlimpin, flute solo, orchestra (1962)
- Le Rire, tape (1962)
- Dimensioni III, flute and piccolo solo, orchestra (1963)
- Entropia I, section of Dimensioni III (1963)
- Entropia II, section of Dimensioni III (1963)
- Aria, soprano solo, flute solo, orchestra (1964)
- Dimensioni IV, flute solo, chamber ensemble (1964) (includes Dimensioni III and Aria)
- Hyperion, includes Dimensioni IV, Le Rire, and Dimensioni II (1964)
- Stele per diotima, solo violin, clarinet, bass clarinet, horn, orchestra (1965)
- Hyperion II, version of Dimensioni III with flute cadenzas, and Entropia II (1965)
- Hyperion, version of Dimensioni III with piccolo solos and Aria (1966)
- Hyperion III, includes Stele per diotima, piccolo solos from Dimensioni III, Aria, and other parts of Dimensioni III (1966)
- Hyperion IV, version of Hyperion (1966 version), Hyperion II, and Suite aus der Oper 'Hyperion' (1969)
- Aulodia per Lothar, oboe d'amore, guitar (1965)
- Amanda/Serenata VI, chamber ensemble (1966)
- Widmung, solo violin (1967)
- Concerto per oboe e orchestra no. 2, solo musette and oboe d'amore, orchestra (1967)
- Hyperion en het geweld, includes Hyperion and new material (1968)
- Hyperion - Orfeo dolente, includes movements from Hyperion interspersed with the five intermedii of Domenico Belli's Orfeo Dolente (1968)
- Entropia III, section of Suite aus der Oper 'Hyperion' (1968–1969)
- Gesti, version of Entropia III (1969?)
- Suite aus der Oper 'Hyperion', 2 solo flutes, solo oboe, speaker, chorus, orchestra (1969–1970)
- Quadrivium, orchestra (1969)
- Concerto per violino e orchestra, violin solo, orchestra (1969)
- Serenata per un satellite, chamber ensemble (1969)
- Ritratto di Erasmo, tape (1969)
- From A to Z/Von A bis Z, tape (1969)
- Grande Auloida, orchestra (1970)
- Tempo libero, tape (1970
- Juilliard Serenade/Tempo libero II, chamber ensemble (1970–1971)
- Viola (o Viola d'amore), solo viola or viola d'amore (1971)
- Y despuès, guitar solo (1971)
- Solo, musette, oboe, oboe d'amore, cor anglais (one player) (1971)
- Pièce pour Ivry, solo violin (1971)
- Ausstrahlung, tape, soprano, orchestra (1971)
- Dialodia, 2 flutes, 2 oboes, or other instruments (1971)
- Venetian Journal, tape, tenor solo, chamber ensemble (1971–1972)
- Aura, orchestra (1972)
- Biogramma, orchestra (1972)
- Giardino religioso, chamber ensemble (1972)
- Ages, tape (1972)
- All the World's a Stage, 2 SATBar choirs (1972)
- Satyricon, solo voices, chamber ensemble (1971–1973)
- Concerto no. 3 pour hautbois et orchestre, oboe solo, orchestra (1973)
- Concerto per due pianoforti, violoncello e orchestra (begun 1973) (lost, incomplete)
