= Maria Antonietta (singer) =

Italian singer-songwriter (born 1987)

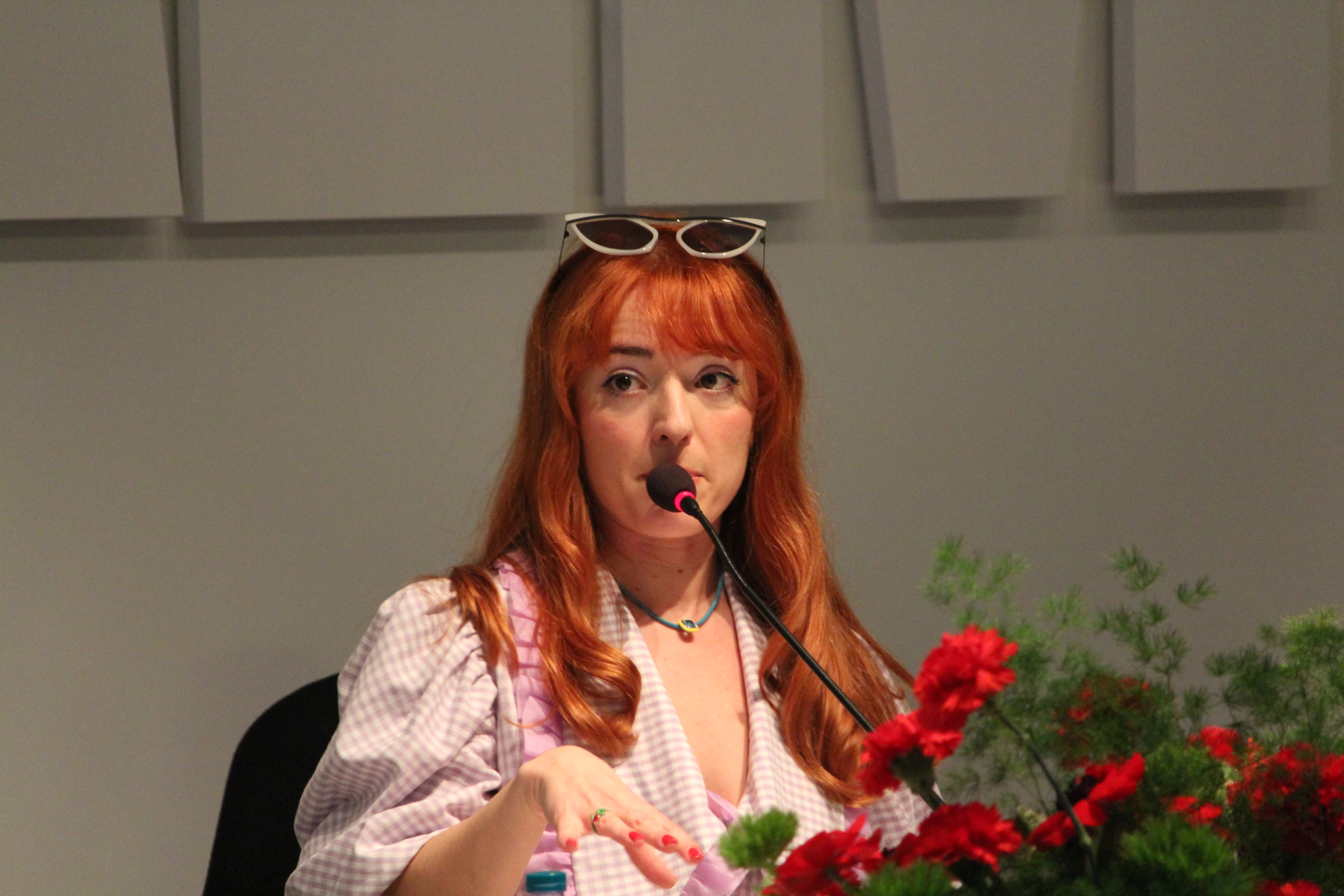
- Maria Antonietta in February 2026

Background information
- Also known as: Marie Antoniette
- Born: Letizia Cesarini; 26 August 1987 (age 38); Pesaro, Marche, Italy
- Genres: Indie pop; indie rock
- Occupations: Singer; songwriter
- Instruments: Vocals; guitar
- Years active: 2007–present
- Labels: Picicca Dischi (2012–2013); La Tempesta Dischi (2013–2022); Warner Music Italy (2023–present)
- Partner: Colombre (2011–present)

Letizia Cesarini (born 26 August 1987), known professionally as Maria Antonietta, is an Italian singer-songwriter.

== Early life and education ==
She was born Letizia Cesarini in Pesaro, in Marche, Italy in 1987. She described herself as a strong student at school, and graduated in Medieval Art History, an interest inherited from her father, an icon painter, at the University of Urbino. In the 2010s, following a return to religion, she also studied theology.

She began her musical career at the age of eighteen. In an interview, she revealed that her artistic breakthrough came after meeting Bob Corn in Verona in 2007.

== Career ==
=== As musician ===
She came to prominence as the vocalist and guitarist of the musical duo, Young Wrists, which she formed with Alberto Baldolini. In July 2009, she recorded and self-produced her solo debut album. In reference to Marie Antoinette, the album was titled Marie Antoinette Wants to Suck Your Young Blood, and featured a punk attitude and English lyrics. The album's theme was the courage of women, and there are dedications to Joan of Arc and the poet Sylvia Plath.

In November 2011, Young Wrists disbanded. Her second album, titled Maria Antonietta, was distributed under her stage name Maria Antonietta, and released on 6 January 2012 via Picicca Dischi. The album was recorded and produced by Brunori Sas and features various vocal and artistic influences by singers such as Nada, Carmen Consoli, and Cristina Donà, and Antonietta's punk soul also brings to mind PJ Harvey and Courtney Love. This album also contains elements of hagiography and references to the sacred, especially feminine, universe mixed with the profane (see "Saint Catherine" and "Mary Magdalene"), and highly autobiographical lyrics. The singles released are "Quanti eri bello" and "Saliva". A video for the former was directed by Giacomo Triglia, while the latter features Leandro Emede and Nicoló Cerioni.

In May 2012, Maria Antonietta won the KeepOn Award in the "Live Revelation" category. She was hearlded to be an emerging star of the Italian independent music scene.

After an acoustic tour, on 18 June 2013, she released the single "Animali", marking her debut with the record label La Tempesta Dischi. The single is accompanied by a cover of Gigliola Cinquetti's "Non ho l'età (Per amarti)" and the music video for "Animali", which she edited herself with filming by Flavia Eleonora Tullio and published exclusively on the La Repubblica XL website. From June to August 2013, she embarked on a new tour, accompanied by her brothers Marco and Colombre, members of Dadamatto and Chewingum, respectively. In July 2013 he joined the project Hai paura del buio?, promoted by Afterhours: it is a travelling cultural festival in which not only other musicians (including Marta sui Tubi, Il Teatro degli Orrori, Daniele Silvestri and Verdena) take part, but also cinema and theatre actors (Antonio Rezza with Flavia Mastrella, Michele Riondino), writers (Chiara Gamberale, Paolo Giordano), designers and dancers.

On 20 January 2014 she announced the release of her second official album (and third overall), titled Sassi. The album was produced and arranged by Marco Imparato and Colombre and distributed by La Tempesta Dischi, released on 11 March. In February, the video for the song "Ossa", was released, and a month later, that of "Giardino comunale", directed by Dandaddy (who previously worked on Baustelle, Le luci della centrale elettrica, and Dente). In November 2014, after the release of the video for the song "Tra me e tutte le cose", she began a new tour, accompanied by Colombre and Fabio Marconi.

On 21 April 2015, she released the EP Maria Antonietta loves Chewingum, created in collaboration with the Italian band, Chewingum, who have accompanied the singer in numerous live concerts. In May 2015, she performed at Musica da bere, where she won the Emerging Artist Award.

In 2017, she collaborated with Tre Allegri Ragazzi Morti as a songwriter for the song "E invece niente". She also worked in the theater world, composing the music for a new version of the show Tutta casa, letto e chiesa by Dario Fo and Franca Rame, directed by Sandro Mabellini and starring Valentina Lodovini.

In January 2018, she released a new single, "Deluderti", which previewed her third studio album. Her next single, "Pesci", was released the following March. On 30 March 2018, she released her third studio album, Deluderti, and on 1 May, she performed at the traditional concert in Rome.

In February 2020, she sang a duet at the Sanremo Music Festival on cover night with Levante (a competitor) and Francesca Michielin on the song "Si può dare di più". In 2021 she hosted Sacra bellezza on Sky Arte, a documentary series focusing on relics and Christian sacred art, and the following year, the documentary Maddalena - Il mistero e l'immagine, dedicated to the exhibition of the same name.

After a period of writing and health problems, in 2023 she duetted with Colombre in "Io te certamente" and in May 2023 she released the album La tigre assenza, whose title pays homage to Cristina Campo's poetry collection of the same name. It was preceded by the singles "Arrivederci", released in January on the Warner label; "Per le ragazze come me", featuring Laila Al Habash; and "Viale Regina Margherita", written with Francesco Bianconi of Baustelle. On 2 July she and Laila Al Habash opened for Lana Del Rey at Lido di Camaiore, part of the La Prima Estate festival.

On 19 September 2025 she released the collaborative album Luna di miele together with Colombre. On 30 November, paired with the latter, she was announced alongside among the participants of the Sanremo Music Festival 2026. They competed with the song "La felicità e basta".

=== As author ===
In July 2011 she co-wrote the book Cosa vuoi sentire, along with 13 other artists from the Italian independent scene. The collection includes fourteen short stories and was published by Minimum fax.

In 2019, she published the book Sette ragazze imperdonabili, in which she sketches seven female figures to whom she feels connected, including the aforementioned Sylvia Plath and Joan of Arc, as well as Cristina Campo, Etty Hillesum, Antonia Pozzi, Marina Tsvetaeva and Emily Dickinson.

== Personal life ==
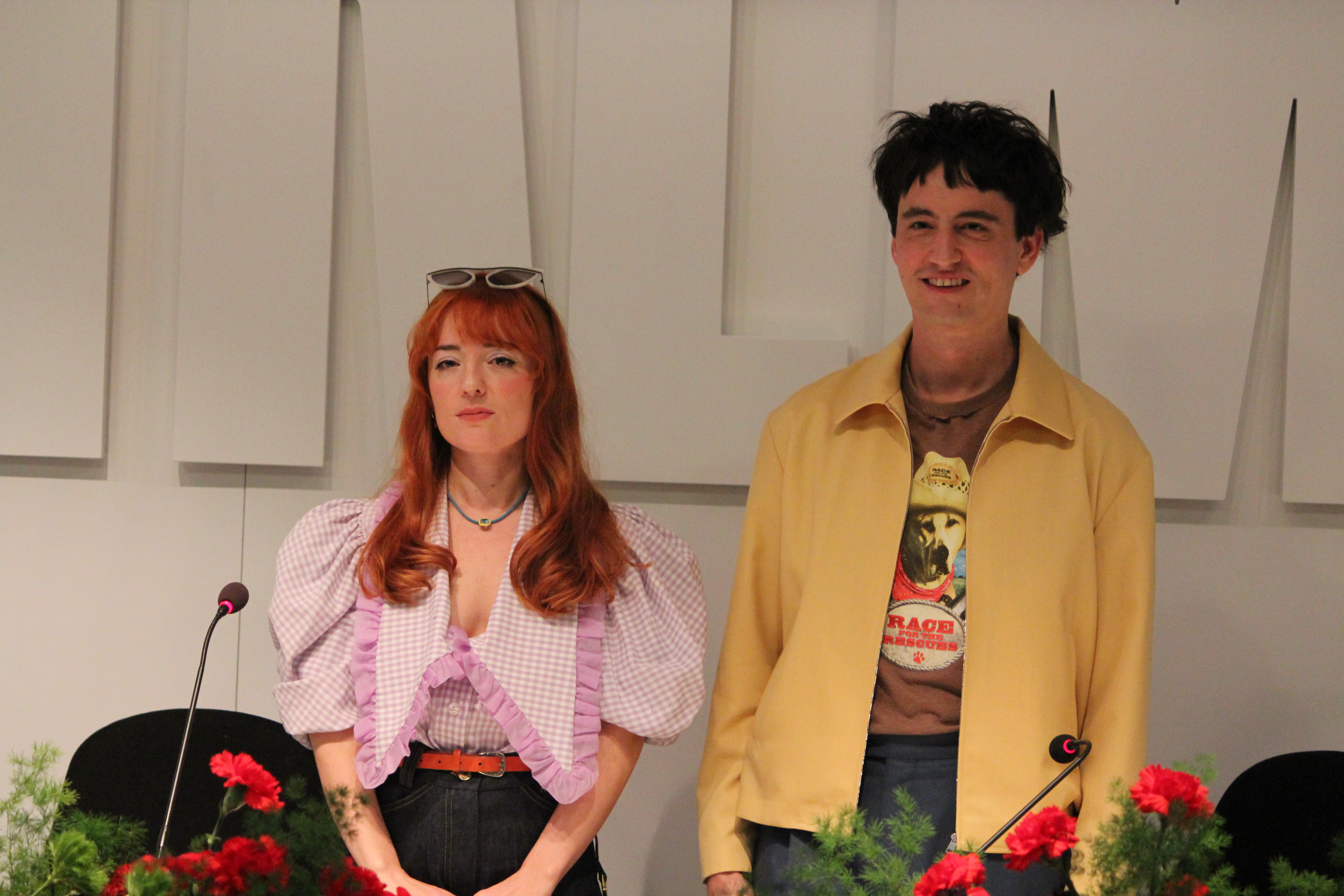
Antonietta and Colombre at Sanremo Music Festival 2026

Since 2011 she has been romantically linked to the singer-songwriter Giovanni "Colombre" Imparato.

== Discography ==
=== Studio albums ===
List of studio albums with details and selected chart positions
| Title | Album details | Peak chart positions |
| Title | Album details | ITA |
|---|---|---|
| Marie Antoinette Wants to Suck Your Young Blood (credited as Marie Antoinette) | Released: July 2010; Label: self-produced; Format: CD, digital download, streaming | — |
| Maria Antonietta | Released: 6 January 2012; Label: Piccica Dischi; Format: CD, digital download, streaming | — |
| Sassi | Released: 11 March 2014; Label: La Tempesta Dischi; Format: CD, digital download, streaming | — |
| Deluderti | Released: 30 March 2018; Label: La Tempesta Dischi; Format: CD, LP, digital download, streaming | 99 |
| La tigre assenza | Released: 26 May 2023; Label: Warner Music Italy; Format: CD, LP, digital download, streaming | — |
| Luna di miele (with Colombre) | Released: 19 September 2025; Label: Bomba Dischi, Numero Uno; Format: CD, LP, digital download, streaming | 63 |
"—" denotes a recording that did not chart or was not released.

=== Extended plays ===
List of EPs
| Title | EP details |
|---|---|
| Maria Antonietta Loves Chewingum (with Chewingum) | Released: 21 April 2015; Label: La Tempesta Dischi; Format: CD, digital download, streaming |

=== Singles ===
==== As lead artist ====
List of singles and album name
| Single | Year | Peak chart positions | Album or EP |
| Single | Year | ITA | Album or EP |
|---|---|---|---|
| "Quanto eri bello" | 2012 | — | Maria Antonietta |
| "Saliva" | 2012 | — | Maria Antonietta |
| "Animali" | 2013 | — | Sassi |
| "Ossa" | 2014 | — | Sassi |
| "Giardino comunale" | 2014 | — | Sassi |
| "Abbracci" | 2014 | — | Sassi |
| "Tra me e tutte le cose" | 2014 | — | Sassi |
| "Molto presto" (with Chewingum) | 2015 | — | Maria Antonietta Loves Chewingum |
| "Deluderti" | 2018 | — | Deluderti |
| "Pesci" | 2018 | — | Deluderti |
| "Vergine" | 2018 | — | Deluderti |
| "Arrivederci" | 2023 | — | La tigre assenza |
| "Per le ragazze come me" (featuring Laila Al Habash) | 2023 | — | La tigre assenza |
| "Viale Regina Margherita" | 2023 | — | La tigre assenza |
| "Signorina, buonasera" (with Colombre) | 2025 | — | Luna di miele |
| "Gomma americana" (with Colombre) | 2025 | — | Luna di miele |
| "La felicità e basta" (with Colombre) | 2026 | 58 | Luna di miele |
| "Il mondo" (with Colombre featuring Brunori Sas) | 2026 | — | Luna di miele (Sanremo Edition) |
"—" denotes singles that did not chart or were not released.

==== As featured artist ====
List of singles and album name
| Title | Year | Album |
|---|---|---|
| "Io e te certamente" (Colombre featuring Maria Antonietta) | 2023 | Realismo magico in Adriatico |

== Television programs ==
| Year | Title | Network | Rol | Notes |
|---|---|---|---|---|
| 2020 | Castrocaro Music Festival | Rai 2 | Juror | Annual music festival |
| 2021 | Sacra bellezza - Storie di santi e reliquie | Sky Arte | Host | Historical TV program |
| 2022 | Maddalena - Il mistero e l'immagine | Sky Arte | Host | Historical TV program |
| 2026 | Sanremo Music Festival 2026 | Rai 1 | Contestant | Annual music festival |

== Written works ==
- Antonietta, Maria (November 2011). "Santa Caterina al Sinai". Cosa volete sentire. Compilation di racconti di cantautori italiani. Minimum fax. ISBN 978-8875213794.
- Antonietta, Maria (March 2019). Sette ragazze imperdonabili. Un libro d'ore. Rizzoli. ISBN 978-8817109932.
