= Guido Guerrini (composer) =

Italian composer (1890–1965)

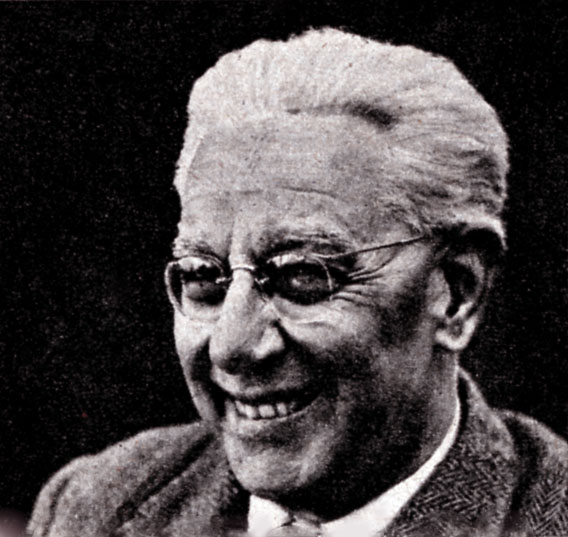
- Guerrini in 1955
- Born: 12 September 1890; Faenza, Italy
- Died: 14 June 1965 (aged 74); Rome, Italy
- Education: Bologna Conservatory
- Occupations: Composer; violinist; violist; conductor; music educator; academic administrator; music critic
- Years active: 1910s–1965
- Employers: Bologna Conservatory; Parma Conservatory; Florence Conservatory; Conservatorio Santa Cecilia; Accademia Nazionale di Santa Cecilia
- Style: Classical; opera
- Spouse: Emilia Putti (m. 1922)
- Children: Vittoria (pen name: Cristina Campo)
- Military career
- Allegiance: Italy
- Branch: Royal Italian Army
- Conflicts: World War I

Guido Guerrini (12 September 1890 – 14 June 1965) was an Italian composer, violinist, violist, conductor, music educator, academic administrator, and music critic. He began his career as a violinist, violist, and conductor in Bologona in the 1910s. After serving in the Italian Army during World War I, he taught on the faculties of several music conservatories in Italy and was the longtime director of the Florence Conservatory from 1928 to 1947. His work in Florence was interrupted during World War II, when he was imprisoned in an Italian Fascist concentration camp in 1944–1945. While there, he composed his opera Enea which was later staged at the Teatro dell'Opera di Roma in 1953. He also served as director of the Bologna Conservatory (1947–1949) and the Conservatorio Santa Cecilia (1950–1960). At the time of his death in 1965, he was president of the Accademia Nazionale di Santa Cecilia, having succeeded Alessandro Bustini in 1964.

As a composer, Guerrini's early music was inspired heavily was by Maurice Ravel and Richard Strauss, but he later mitigated his penchant for romantic music with a more architectural and intellectual approach to composing. His most successful pieces were his requiem Missa pro defunctis and his mass Sette variazioni sopra una sarabanda di Corelli. He also wrote multiple operas which were staged during his lifetime at theaters in Italy, and composed a variety of orchestral works, chamber music, and choral music.

== Early life and education ==
The son of Pietro and Antonietta Santucci, Guido Guerrini was born in Faenza, Italy, on 12 September 1890. He received his initial musical training from his father. After completing high school in 1907, he entered the Bologna Conservatory, where his trained to be a violinist under Angelo Consolini (1859–1934). After earning his diploma in violin in 1911, he continued his studies there in music composition under Ferruccio Busoni and Luigi Torchi. He graduated with a second diploma in composition in 1914.

== Career ==
Guerrini worked as both a professional violinist and violist in orchestras in Bologna in the 1910s. He also periodically worked as a guest conductor at theatres in Bologna, including conducting operas at the Teatro Comunale di Bologna when a substitute conductor was needed. During World War I, he served in the Royal Italian Army. In 1922, he married Emilia Putti, and, in 1923, their daughter Vittoria was born.

From 1920 to 1924, Guerrini taught on the faculty of the Bologna Conservatory as a professor of harmony. He then joined the staff of Parma Conservatory, where he taught from 1925 to 1928, holding the post of chair of music composition. He was appointed director of the Florence Conservatory in 1928, a post he held until 1947. He subsequently served as director of the Bologna Conservatory from 1947 to 1949, and as director of the Conservatorio Santa Cecilia from 1950 until his retirement in 1960. He was later name president of the Accademia Nazionale di Santa Cecilia in 1964; a position he held until his death the following year.

Guerrini was also part of an executive committee over the Maggio Musicale Fiorentino from 1931 to 1933. That opera festival presented the premiere of an opera he co-wrote with A. Testoni, La vigna, in 1935. During World War II, he was imprisoned in an Italian Fascist concentration camp in Collescipoli, Terni, from December 1944 through August 1945. He wrote his opera Enea while in this camp; the work was staged at the Teatro dell'Opera di Roma in 1953. He also wrote a choral piece, Missa quarta, which was first sung in the camp on Christmas Day 1945. From 1952 to 1957, he was director of the Rome Chamber Orchestra (Orchestra da camera di Roma). During his career, he also wrote music criticism for a variety of Italian publications.

Guerrini died in Rome on 14 June 1965, aged 74.

== Composer ==
As a composer, Guerrini's output included orchestral works, chamber music, operas and choral music. He wrote in a style heavily influenced by Maurice Ravel and Richard Strauss in the early part of his career. Some of his better-known works from this period are his tone poem L'ultimo viaggio d'Odisseo and his Sonata for violin and pianoforte, both composed in 1921. That same year, his opera Nemici premiered at the Teatro Comunale di Bologna. Later, his work became more architectural and academic in design, which somewhat modernized and mitigated his tendencies toward romanticism.

Guerrini's most successful pieces in his later career were his sacred works, including the requiem Missa pro defunctis for vocal soloists, chorus and orchestra, which he composed in 1938–1939; and the mass Sette variazioni sopra una sarabanda di Corelli (1940). Missa pro defunctis was written in honor of the Italian inventor Guglielmo Marconi and premiered at the Teatro Comunale, Florence, on 28 April 1942. For this work he was awarded a prize by the Royal Academy of Italy.
