= Stabat Mater (Haydn) =

1767 musical work by Joseph Haydn

- by Joseph Haydn
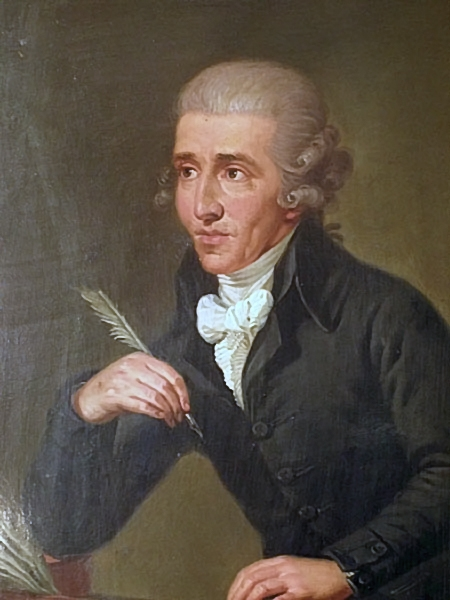
- Portrait of Haydn, 1770
- Catalogue: Hob. XXa:1
- Text: Stabat Mater
- Language: Latin
- Composed: 1767
- Performed: 17 March 1767
- Movements: 13
- Vocal: soprano, alto, tenor and bass soloists and choir
- Instrumental: oboes; strings; basso continuo

Joseph Haydn's Stabat Mater, Hob. XXa:1, is a setting of the Stabat Mater sequence, written in 1767 for soloists, mixed choir and an orchestra of oboes, strings and continuo. The first performance is believed to have taken place on 17 March 1767 at the Esterhazy court. A performance in Vienna the following year began a wide distribution. His setting is regarded as an important one among around 600, along with the earlier by Pergolesi and the later compositions by Rossini and by Dvořák.

== History ==
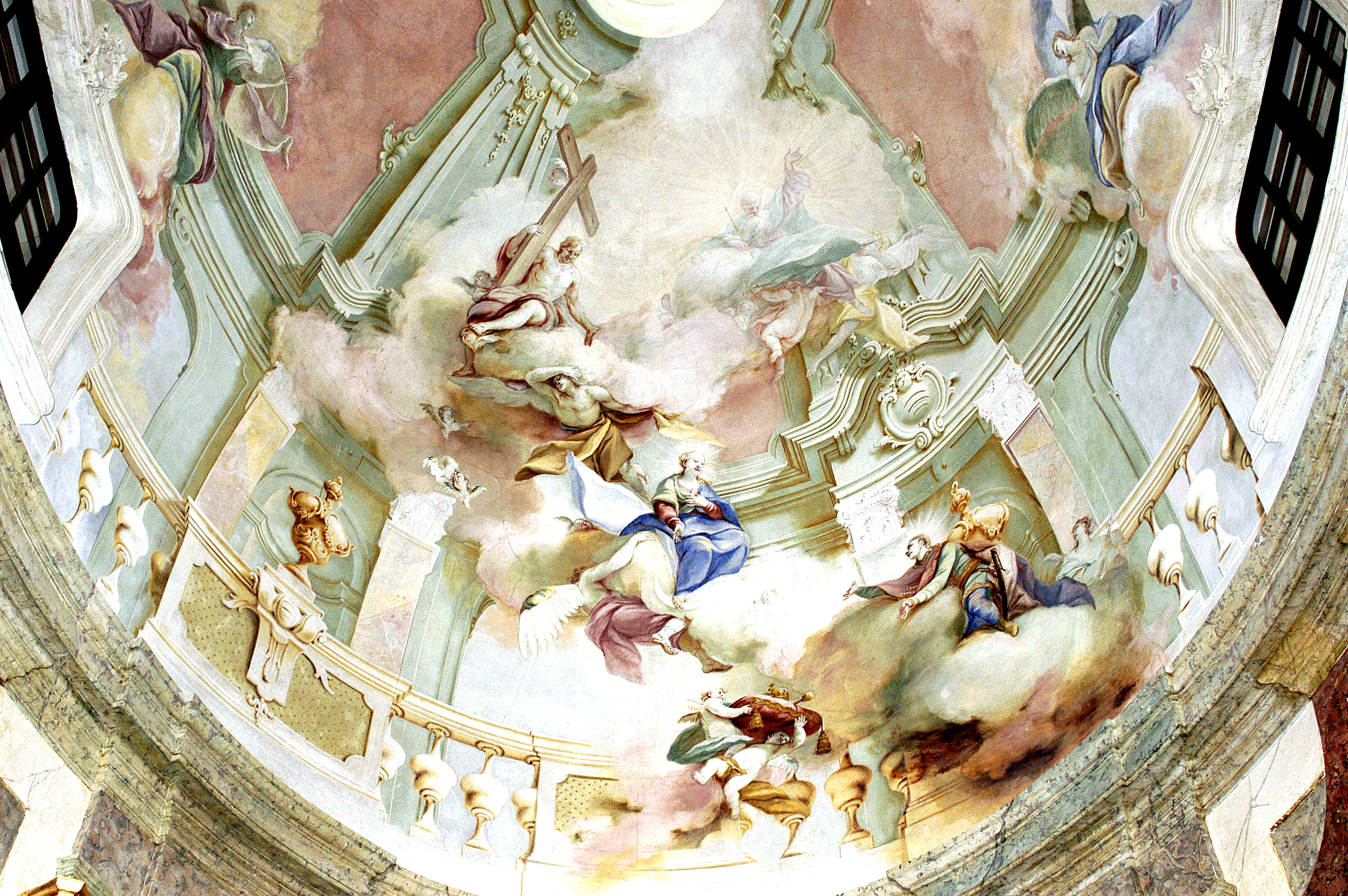
Cupola of the palace chapel, Assumption of Mary

Joseph Haydn achieved sole leadership of the music at the court of Eszterháza in 1766, where he had already been responsible for chamber music and musical theatre. He had already served for six years, under Gregor Joseph Werner, and had composed for the court 15 symphonies and two operas. When he became responsible also for sacred music, which Werner had reserved for himself until his death, he set the Stabat Mater sequence as his first major sacred composition, completing it in 1767. While the autograph score is lost, a 1778 letter refers to the work. The first performance was probably on Good Friday that year, on 17 March 1767, at the palace chapel as part of the regular oratorio performance.

The letter also refers to a performance in Vienna in 1768; Haydn had sent the score for Johann Adolph Hasse, who praised the music and organised the performance. Haydn applied for a leave of three days for himself and three musicians around Good Friday, and possibly the four took part in the performance at the Church of St. John of God Brothers which began the circulation of the work.

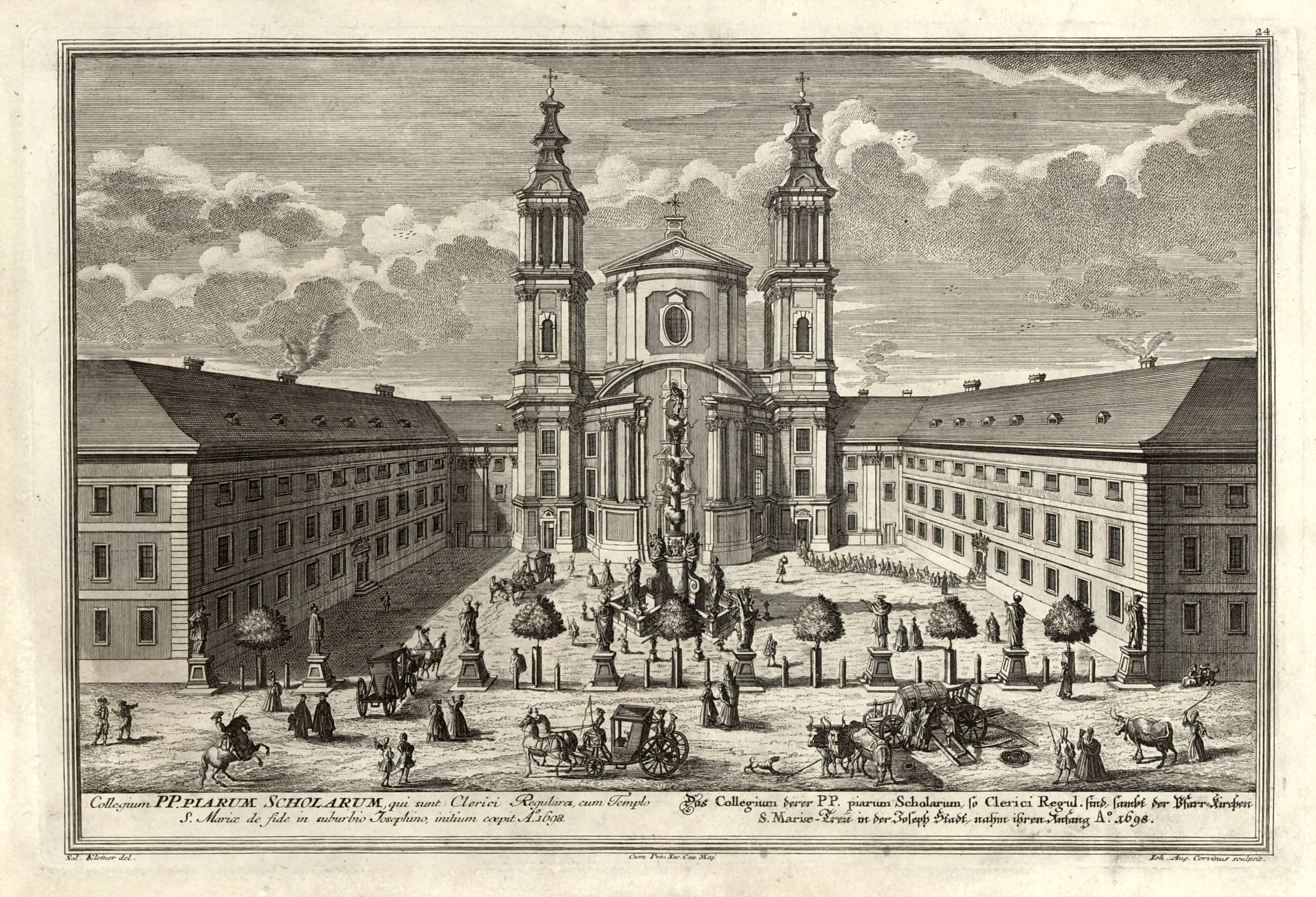
1724 engraving of the Piarist Church while under construction

The first public performance was also in Vienna, on Good Friday 1771 at the Piarist Church. According to the church's chronicle, Haydn conducted an ensemble of 60 musicians. His work spread to churches and concert halls. 180 copies are extant. Haydn called the work an oratorio in 1805.

For a performance in 1803, Haydn's pupil Sigismund von Neukomm composed additional parts for flute, two clarinets, two bassoons, two horns, two trumpets and timpani. Haydn offered this version to the publisher Gottfried Christoph Härtel, but it is not regarded as authentic. On 14 April 1930 Alessandro Bustini conducted the work at the Accademia Filarmonica Romana in Rome, in what his biographers describe as its first performance in Italy, and also realized the continuo.

== Structure and scoring ==
Haydn divided the text into 14 movements:

1. Stabat Mater dolorosa, Largo, G minor, common time
2. O quam tristis et afflicta, Larghetto Affettuoso E♭ major, 3/8
3. Quis est homo qui non fleret, Lento, C minor, common time
4. Quis non posset contristari, Moderato, F major, common time
5. Pro peccatis suae gentis, Allegro ma non troppo, B♭ major, common time
6. Vidit suum dulcem natum, Lento e mesto, F minor, common time
7. Eja Mater, fons amoris, Allegretto, D minor, 3/8
8. Sancta Mater, istud agas, Larghetto, B♭ major, 2/4
9. Fac me vere tecum flere, Lagrimoso, G minor, common time
10. Virgo virginum praeclara, Andante, E♭ major, 3/4
11. Flammis orci ne succendar, Presto, C minor, common time
12. Fac me cruce custodiri, Moderato, C major, common time
13. Quando corpus morietur, Largo assai, G minor, common time
14. Paradisi gloria, G major, cut time

He scored it for soprano, alto, tenor and bass soloists, mixed choir, two oboes both doubling English horn in the sections in E♭ major, strings and organ continuo. Conductor Jonathan Green suggests adding a bassoon to double the bass line and perhaps just one player to each string part.

Haydn's scoring is rich compared with earlier settings of the sequence, such as Pergolesi's examplary setting setting for two solo voices and a church trio of two violins and basso continuo. Haydn followed Pergolesi's model in a "Neapolitan" cantability and in phrasing the text.

== Reactions ==
Pergolesi's Stabat Mater was already popular when Haydn composed his. Haydn used it as a model in some details, such as the "Vidit suum". According to Heartz, it emulates "Pergolesi in its melodic traits, rhythmic quirks, and thin texture. Haydn, like Traetta, even adapted a feature of Pergolesi's text setting, the breaking up with rests of 'dum e-mi-sit spiritum' in order to convey the last gasps of the dying Christ." Heartz continued: "Hasse was greatly impressed with Haydn's Stabat mater, which must have seemed to him an added vindication of the Neapolitan style [of Pergolesi] that he more than anyone else had brought to flower in central Europe." According to Haydn himself, four performances in Paris were very successful.

Haydn's Stabat Mater is considered suitable for a penitential Good Friday program.

== Recordings ==
- 1979 – Arleen Auger, Alfreda Hodgson, Anthony Rolfe Johnson, Gwynne Howell – London Chamber Choir, Academy of St. Martin in the Fields, László Heltay – 2 LPs/CD Decca Records
- 1983 – Sheila Armstrong, Ann Murray, Martin Hill, Philippe Huttenlocher – Ensemble Vocal de Lausanne, Orchestre de Chambre de Lausanne, Michel Corboz – LP/CD Erato
- 1989 – Patricia Rozario, Catherine Robbin, Johnson, Cornelius Hauptmann – The English Concert & Choir, Trevor Pinnock – CD Archiv Produktion
- 1995 – Barbara Bonney, Elisabeth von Magnus, Herbert Lippert, Alastair Miles – Arnold Schoenberg Choir, Concentus Musicus Wien, Nikolaus Harnoncourt – CD Telarc
