= Bruno Maderna =

Italian composer and conductor

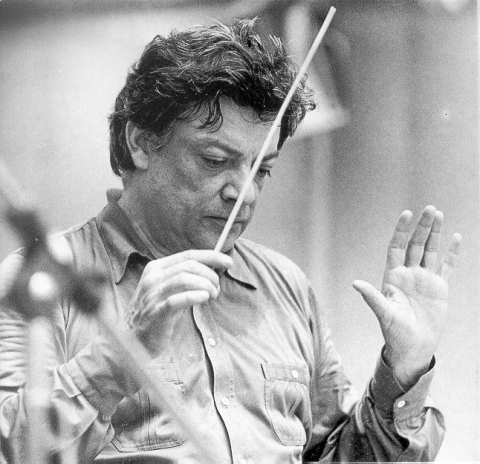
- Maderna in 1963
- Born: Bruno Grossato; 21 April 1920; Venice, Italy
- Died: 13 November 1973 (aged 53); Darmstadt, Germany
- Education: Rome Conservatory
- Occupations: Composer; Violinist; Conductor
- Organizations: Studio di fonologia musicale di Radio Milano; Milan Conservatory; Dartington International Summer School
- Works: List of compositions

Bruno Maderna (born Bruno Grossato, 21 April 1920 – 13 November 1973) was an Italian composer, conductor and academic teacher.

== Life ==
Maderna was born Bruno Grossato in Venice but later decided to take the name of his mother, Caterina Carolina Maderna. At the age of four, he began studying the violin with his grandfather. "My grandfather thought that if you could play the violin you could then do anything, even become the biggest gangster. If you play the violin you are always sure of a place in heaven." As a child, he played several instruments (violin, drums and accordion) in his father's small variety band. A child prodigy, in the early thirties, he was not only performing violin concertos, he was already conducting orchestral concerts: first with the orchestra of La Scala in Milan, then in Trieste, Venice, Padua and Verona. He was originally Jewish.

His mother died when he was four. Maderna was then adopted by a wealthy woman from Verona, Irma Manfredi, who saw to it that he received a solid musical education. He took private lessons in harmony and musical composition from Arrigo Pedrollo from 1935 until 1937 and studied composition with Alessandro Bustini at the Rome Conservatory from 1937 until 1940.

After Rome, he returned to Venice, where he attended the advanced course for composers (1940–42) organised by Gian Francesco Malipiero at the Benedetto Marcello Conservatory (his Concerto for Piano and Orchestra dates from this time). He also studied conducting with Antonio Guarnieri at the Accademia Chigiana in Siena (1941) and Hermann Scherchen in Venice (1948). Through Scherchen Maderna discovered twelve-tone technique and the music of the Second Viennese School.

During the Second World War, he took part in the partisan resistance. From 1948 to 1952, he taught music theory at the Venice Conservatory. During this period, he collaborated with Malipiero on critical editions of Italian early music. Fellow composers he met at this time included Luigi Dallapiccola and, at the Internationale Ferienkurse für Neue Musik, Boulez, Messiaen, Cage, Pousseur, Nono and Stockhausen.

== Conductor/teacher ==
In 1950, Maderna started an international career as a conductor, first in Paris and Munich, then across Europe. In 1955, he founded the Studio di fonologia musicale di Radio Milano with Luciano Berio and Incontri musicali, a series of concerts disseminating contemporary music in Italy.

With his later wife Beate Christina Koepnick, a young actress from Darmstadt, Maderna had three children.

In 1957–58, at the invitation of Giorgio Federico Ghedini, he taught at the Milan Conservatory, and between 1960 and 1962 he lectured at Dartington International Summer School in England. From 1961 to 1966, Maderna and Pierre Boulez were the main directors of the International Kranichsteiner Kammerensemble in Darmstadt. Despite this heavy workload throughout these years Maderna found time to compose.

During the 1960s and '70s, he spent much time in the United States, teaching and conducting. In 1971–72, he was appointed director of new music at Tanglewood. In 1972–73, he became the principal conductor of the Orchestra Sinfonica of RAI in Milan.

Maderna died of lung cancer in Darmstadt in 1973, at the age of 53. A number of composers wrote pieces in Maderna's memory, including Pierre Boulez (Rituel in memoriam Bruno Maderna) and Luciano Berio (Calmo for voice and orchestra). Earle Brown's Centering, dedicated to the memory of Maderna, ends with a short quotation from Maderna's First Oboe Concerto.

== Work ==
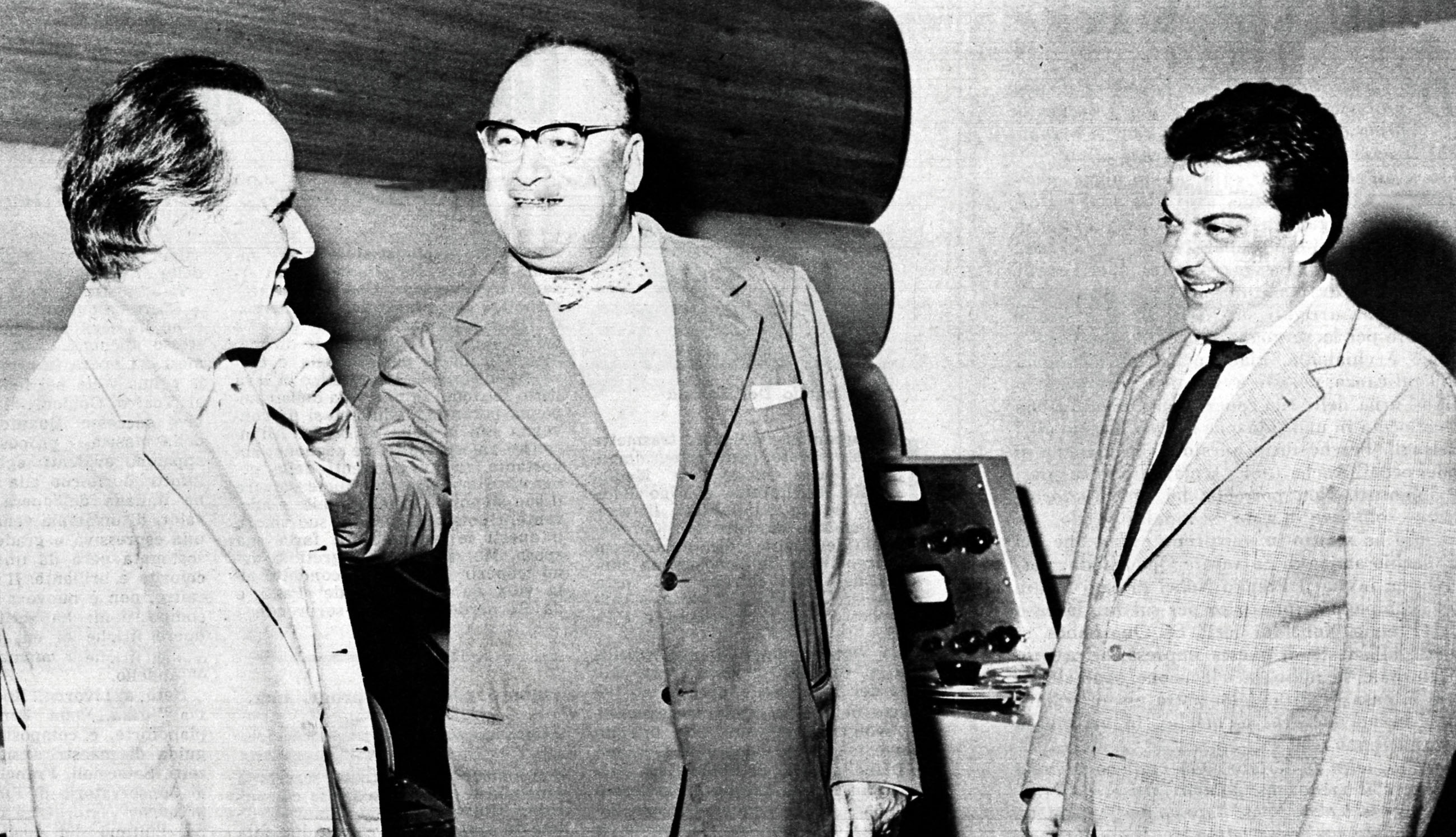
Maderna (right) with Nino Rota and Riccardo Bacchelli in 1963

Maderna composed much music in all genres: instrumental, chamber, concertos and electronic, as well as large amounts of incidental music (for theatre and radio) and transcriptions and editions of early music.

At the heart of Maderna's output are a number of concertos, including one for violin, one for two pianos, two for solo piano and several for flute and orchestra. He was particularly drawn to the oboe, composing three concertos in all: the first in 1962–63, followed by two more in 1967 and 1973.

Other major orchestral works include Aura and Biogramma (both 1967) and Quadrivium, for four percussionists and four orchestral groups (premiered at the 1969 Royan Festival). Giuseppe Sinopoli recorded all three of these pieces with the North German Radio Symphony Orchestra in 1979. Maderna's Requiem, composed between 1944 and 1946, was rediscovered and performed in 2009; the American composer Virgil Thomson saw an unfinished version of the score in 1946 and praised it as a masterpiece.

Bruno Maderna also produced scores for eight films and two documentaries. The last of these was for Giulio Questi's thriller La morte ha fatto l'uovo in 1968.

His opera, Satyricon, was premiered in 1973.

Maderna was also a prominent composer in genres such as electronic music, experimental music and avant-garde music. His work Musica su due dimensioni for flute, cymbals, and tape, which premiered at the Darmstadt Summer Courses for New Music in 1952, is one of the earliest examples of a composer combining acoustic and electronic sounds.

== Recordings (as a conductor) ==
- Luna Alcalay: Una strofa di Dante (Radiosinfonieorchester Wien; ORF Chor; AKM Orf; 1967)
- Béla Bartók: Piano Concerto No. 1 (Alfred Brendel; BBC SO; Stradivarius; 1973)
- Alban Berg:
  - Orchesterlieder nach Ansichtskartentexten von Peter Altenberg, Op. 4 (Halina Lukomska; Concertgebouw Orchestra; RCO Live; 1968)
  - Drei Orchesterstücke, Op. 6 (Sinfonieorchester des Norddeutschen Rundfunks; Arkadia, 1969)
  - Wozzeck (Chor der Hamburgischen Staatsoper; Orchester der Hamburgischen Staatsoper; Toni Blankenheim, Richard Cassilly, Peter Haage, Gerhard Unger; Art Haus Musik, 1970)
  - Lulu (Orchestra della RAI di Roma; Ilona Steingruber, Eugenia Zareska, Luisa Ribacchi, Maria Teresa, Massa Ferrero; live 1959; Stradivarius, 1959)
  - Lulu Suite (Mary Lindsay, soprano; Süddeutsches Rundfunk Sinfonieorchester; Arkadia, 1969)
- Konrad Boehmer: Position (WDR Sinfonieorchester Köln, BVHaast, 1963)
- Pierre Boulez:
  - Le marteau sans maître (Carla Henius, alto; Severino Gazzelloni, flute; Dino Asciolla, viola; Leonida Torrebruno, percussion. Stradivarius, 1961)
  - Figures—Doubles—Prismes (Residentie Orkest, Stradivarius, 1968)
  - Polyphonie X (Orchestra delle RAI, Stradivarius, 1953)
- Johannes Brahms: Double concerto (Salvatore Accardo, violin; Siegfried Palm, cello; Orchestra Sinfonica RAI di Roma; Arkadia, 1961)
- Earle Brown: Available Forms I on Panorama della musica nuova (RCA MLDS 61005, 1964)
- Åke Hermanson: In nuce, Op. 7 (Caprice 22056)
- Günter Kahowez: Plejaden No. 2 (Radio Sinfonie Orchester Wien; AKM Orf; 1966)
- Włodzimierz Kotoński: Canto (Internationales Kranichsteiner Kammerensemble; Wergo, ? )
- György Ligeti: Aventures/Nouvelles Aventures (Internationales Kammerensemble Darmstadt, Wergo, 1968)
- Franz Liszt: Tasso: lamento e trionfo (Orchestra Sinfonica RAI di Torino; Arkadia, 1964)
- Witold Lutosławski: Jeux Vénitiens (Concertgebouworkest, RCO Live, 1967)
- Gustav Mahler:
  - Symphonie No. 7 (Wiener Symphoniker, Hunt, 1967)
  - Symphonie No. 9 (BBC SO, BBC, 1970)
- Gian Francesco Malipiero: Sinfonia della Zodiaco (Orchestra Sinfonica della RAI di Torino; Ricordi, ?)
- Felix Mendelssohn: Symphonie No. 3 (Schottische) (Concertgebouworkest, RCO Live, 1965)
- Claudio Monteverdi: L'Orfeo (Oralia Dominguez, mezzo-soprano; Barry McDaniel, baritone; Koor van de Nederlandse Opera; Utrechts Symfonieorkest. Holland Festival, 1966)
- Mozart: Symphonie No. 18, KV 130 (Orchestra della RAI di Milano, Stradivarius, ? )
- Bo Nilsson: Szene No. 3, 1961 (Internationales Kranichsteiner Kammerensemble, Wergo)
- Luigi Nono: Il canto sospeso (Chor und Sinfonieorchester des Norddeutschen Rundfunks, Stradivarius, 1960)
- Krzysztof Penderecki: Tren Ofiarom Hiroszimy (Orchestra della RAI di Roma; Stradivarius, 1963)
- Goffredo Petrassi: Noche Oscura (Chor und Orchester des Hessischen Rundfunks; Stradivarius, 1952)
- Henri Pousseur: Rimes pour différentes sources sonores [for ensemble and pre-recorded sound on magnetic tape] on Panorama della musica nuova RCA MLDS 61005, 1964
- Maurice Ravel: L'heure espagnole (Suzanne Danco; Michel Hamel; John Cameron; André Vessières; Jean Giraudeau; BBC SO. Stradivarius, 1960)
- Arnold Schoenberg:
  - Verklärte Nacht, Op. 4 (Wiener Symphoniker, Arkadia, 1969)
  - Pelleas und Melisande, Op. 5 (Sinfonieorchester des Südwestfunks, Arkadia, 1960)
  - 5 Orchesterstücke, Op. 16 (Orchestra della RAI di Torino, Stradivarius, ? )
  - Serenade, Op. 24/Suite, Op. 29 (Melos Ensemble of London, Decca, 1962)
  - Variations for Orchestra, Op.31 (Sinfonieorchester des Westdeutschen Rundfunks, Arkadia, 1961)
  - Violin Concerto, Op. 36 (Christiane Edinger, Sinfonie Orchester des Saarlandischen Rundfunks, Arkadia, 1971)
  - Chamber Symphony No. 2, Op. 38 (Sinfonieorchester des Saarlandischen Rundfunks, Arkadia, 1970)
  - Piano Concerto, Op. 42 (Alfred Brendel, BBC SO, Stradivarius, 1973)
  - Genesis, Op. 44 (Coro e Orchestra della RAI di Roma, Stradivarius, 1960)
  - A Survivor from Warsaw, Op. 46 (Goren Kubitzki, Orchestra della RAI di Torino, Stradivarius, ? )
- Robert Schollum: Symphonie No. 4, Op. 74 (Radiosinfonieorchester Wien, AKM Orf, 1966/7)
- Karlheinz Stockhausen:
  - Gruppen für drei Orchester (Sinfonieorchester des Westdeutschen Rundfunks, with Stockhausen and Michael Gielen; Deutsche Grammophon, 1968)
  - Kontra-Punkte on Panorama della musica nuova (RCA MLDS 61005, 1964)
- Igor Stravinsky: Le Sacre du Printemps (Orchestra della RAI di Milano, Stradivarius, ? )
- Edgard Varèse:
  - Déserts (Concertgebouworkest, RCO Live, 1968)
  - Ionisation (Concertgebouworkest, RCO Live, 1966)
- Richard Wagner: Siegfried Idyll (Residenz Orchester Den Haag; Arkadia, 1967)
- Anton Webern:
  - Sechs Stücke für Orchester, Op. 6 (Orchestre delle RAI di Torino, Stradivarius, 1961)
  - Vier Lieder, Op. 13 (Halina Lukomska, Concertgebouw Orkest, RCO Live, 1968)
  - Sechs Lieder, Op. 14 (Dorothy Dorow, Melos Ensemble, Stradivarius, 1961)
  - Concerto, Op. 24 (Melos Ensemble, Stradivarius, 1961)

== Sources ==
- Anon. (2011a). "Bruno Maderna". Encyclopædia Britannica Online.
- Anon. (2011b). Bruno Maderna. bach-cantatas.com. "Compositeur et chef d'orchestre italien né le 21 avril 1920 à Venise, mort le 13 novembre 1973 à Darmstadt, Allemagne"
- Anon. (2013). Centering.
- Anon. (n.d.). "La morte ha fatto l'uovo" [Death Laid an Egg]. IMDb.
- Clements, Dominy (2015). "Bruno Maderna (1920–1973) / Requiem (1946)". musicweb-international.com.
- De Benedictis, Angela Ida (n.d.). Biography: Bruno Maderna. Translated by Mark Weir. Centro Studi Luciano Berio.
- Mattietti, Gianluigi (2006). Maderna, Bruno. Vol. 67.
- Oron, Aryeh (2001). Bruno Maderna (Conductor, Composer).
- Patmore, David (n.d.). Bruno Maderna.
