= Colombre =

Italian singer-songwriter (born 1982)

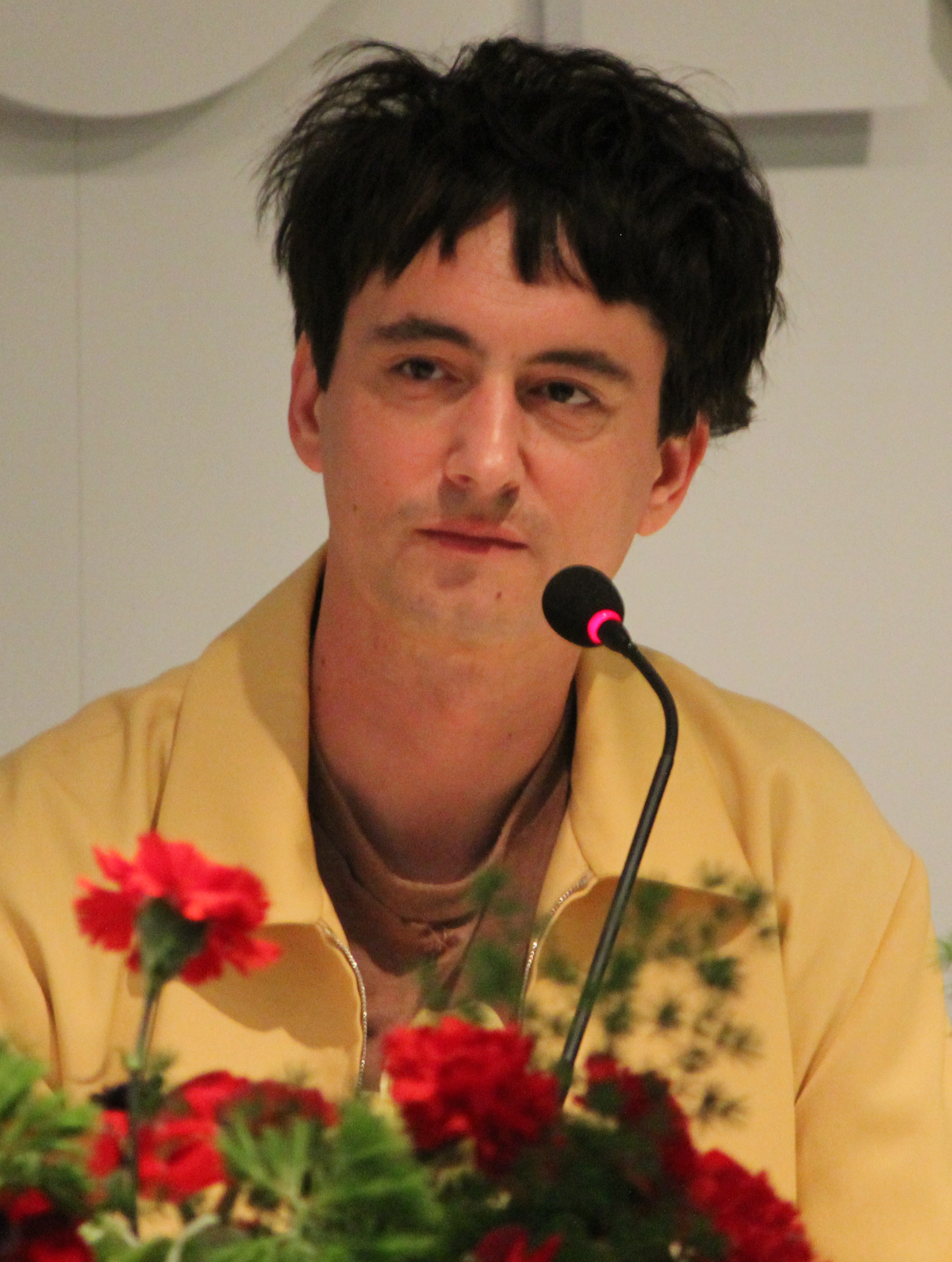
- Colombre in February 2026

Background information
- Born: Giovanni Imparato; 15 August 1982 (age 44); Senigallia, Marche, Italy
- Genres: Indie pop; indie rock
- Occupations: Singer; songwriter
- Instruments: Vocals; guitar
- Years active: 2003–present
- Labels: Bravo Dischi; Bomba Dischi; Universal Music Italia
- Formerly of: Chewingum
- Partner: Maria Antonietta (2011–present)

Giovanni Imparato (born 15 August 1982), known professionally as Colombre, is an Italian singer-songwriter.

== Life and career ==
A literature professor, before embarking on a solo career, he fronted the Italian group Chewingum.

He decided to publish his works under the pseudonym Colombre, a reference to a story by Dino Buzzati. In 2017 he released his debut album, Pulviscolo.

In May 2018, he performed at Musica da Bere, where he was awarded the Emerging Artist Award. In September of the same year, he received the Super MEI Circus Award for Best Young Independent Artist of the Year.

On 20 March 2020 his second album, Corallo, was released by Bomba Dischi/Universal Music Italia. On 31 March 2023 he released his third album, entitled Realismo magico in Adriatico.

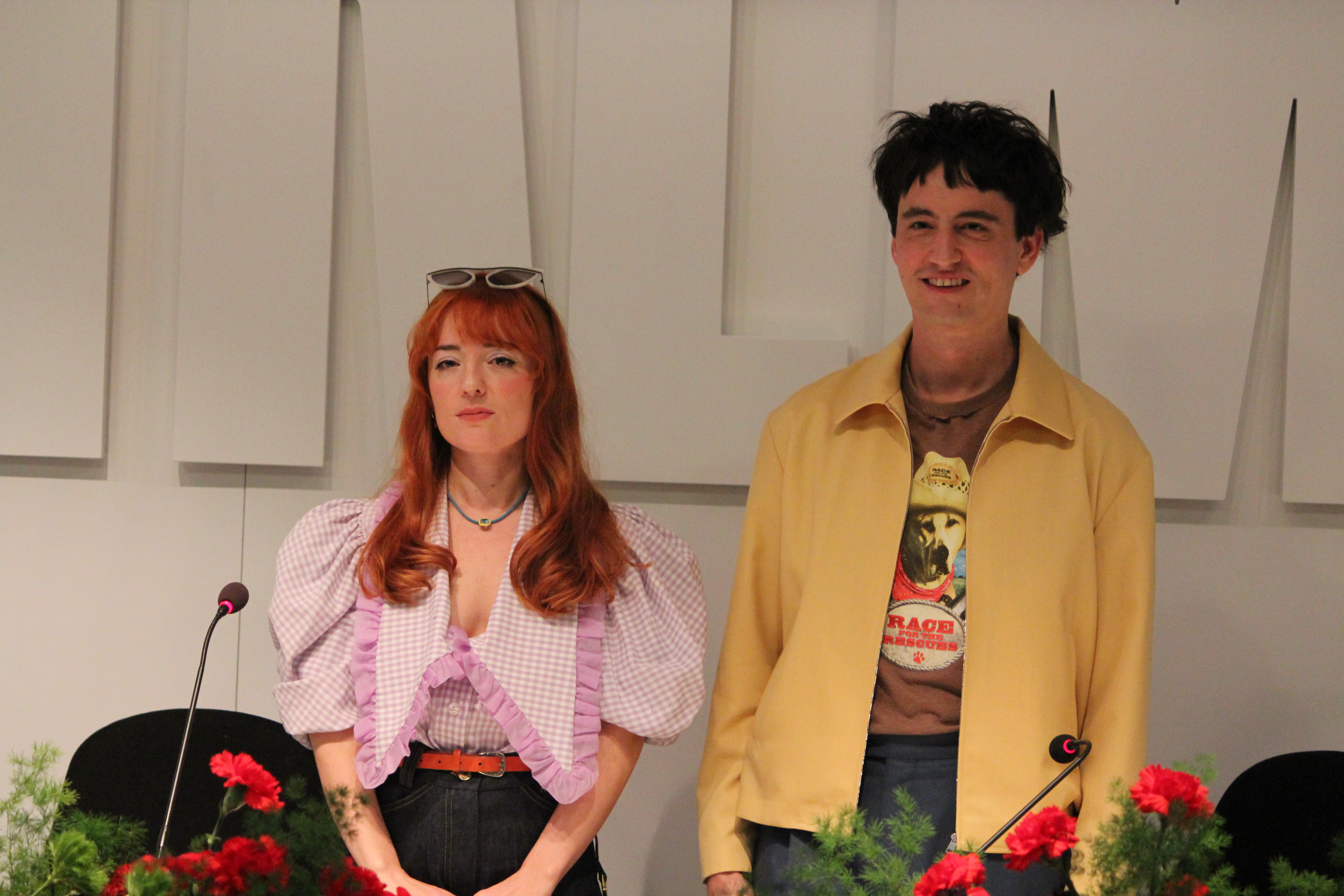
Maria Antonietta and Colombre at the press conference of the Sanremo Music Festival 2026

On 19 September 2025 he released the collaborative album Luna di miele together with Maria Antonietta. On 30 November, paired with the latter, he was announced alongside among the participants of the Sanremo Music Festival 2026. They competed with the song "La felicità e basta".

== Personal life ==
Since 2011 he has been romantically linked to the singer-songwriter Letizia Cesarini, aka Maria Antonietta.

== Discography ==
=== Studio albums ===
List of studio albums with details
Title	Album details	Peak chart positions
Title	Album details	ITA
Pulviscolo	Released: 17 March 2017; Label: Bravo Dischi; Format: CD, digital download, streaming	—
Corallo	Released: 20 March 2020; Label: Puro, Universal Music Italia; Format: CD, LP, digital download, streaming	—
Realismo magico in Adriatico	Released: 31 March 2023; Label: Bomba Dischi, Universal Music Italia; Format: CD, LP, digital download, streaming	—
Luna di miele (with Maria Antonietta)	Released: 19 September 2025; Label: Bomba Dischi, Numero Uno, Universal Music Italia; Format: CD, LP, digital download, streaming	63
"—" denotes a recording that did not chart or was not released.

=== Singles ===
List of singles and album name
Single	Year	Peak chart positions	Album
Single	Year	ITA	Album
"Blatte"	2017	—	Pulviscolo
"Non ti prendo la mano"	2019	—	Corallo
"Arcobaleno"	2019	—	Corallo
"Per un secondo"	2020	—	Corallo
"Il sole non aspetta"	2021	—	Corallo
"Niente è come sembra"	2022	—	Realismo magico in Adriatico
"Durerebbe un'ora"	2023	—	Realismo magico in Adriatico
"Io e te certamente" (featuring Maria Antonietta)	2023	—	Realismo magico in Adriatico
"Adriatico" (featuring Chiello)	2023	—	Realismo magico in Adriatico
"Le navi" (with Pépite)	2024	—	Les années lumière
"Signorina, buonasera" (with Maria Antonietta)	2025	—	Luna di miele
"Gomma americana" (with Maria Antonietta)	2025	—	Luna di miele
"La felicità e basta" (with Maria Antonietta)	2026	58	Luna di miele
"Il mondo" (with Maria Antonietta featuring Brunori Sas)	2026	—	Luna di miele (Sanremo Edition)
"—" denotes singles that did not chart or were not released.

== Television programs ==
Year	Title	Network	Rol	Notes
2026	Sanremo Music Festival 2026	Rai 1	Contestant	Annual music festival

== Awards and nominations ==
Year	Award	Nomination	Result	Notes
2018	Musica da bere	Emerging Artist Award	Won	
2018	Super MEI Circus Award	Best Young Independent Artist of the Year	Won	
