= Lucia Contini Anselmi =

Italian pianist and composer

Lucia Contini Anselmi (15 October 1876 – after 1913) was an Italian pianist and composer.

== Life ==
She was born on 15 October 1876 in Vercelli, Piedmont. was an Italian pianist and composer. She studied piano with Giovanni Sgambati and composition with Alessandro Parisotti at the Conservatory in Rome. After completing her studies, she toured as a concert pianist in Italy and overseas. She received a gold medal for her piano work Ludentia at the International Competition for Composers at Perugia in 1913. Contini Anselmi's fame allowed her a personal reception by Queen Margherita of Italy.

Contini Anselmi composed more than thirty works, mostly for piano but also eight for orchestra, three for violin and piano. She also composed a ballet, Driadi e satiri (Dryads and Satyrs), and an operetta, La Sponda Magica (The Magic Shore), a fairy opera in three acts. She published a treatise in 1908 Della tecnica per l'esecuzione della musica sul pianoforte e sua interpretazione (On the technique of performing music on the piano and its interpretation).

Her death date is unknown, although it is generally agree that she died after 1913. Some of her works were performed at the University of Melbourne in 2020.

== Works ==
Anselmi's works include compositions for orchestra, solo piano, violin and cello. Selected works include:

- Prelude
- Gavotte
- Minuet
- Sonata for Piano in C minor
- Sibylla Cumaea
- Ludentia
- Inno guerresco
