= Elémire Zolla =

Italian essayist, philosopher and historian of religion (1926–2002)

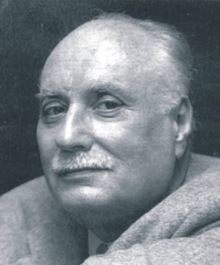
- Born: July 9, 1926; Turin, Italy
- Died: May 29, 2002 (aged 75); Montepulciano, Italy

Elémire Zolla (9 July 1926 – 29 May 2002) was an Italian essayist, philosopher and historian of religion. He was a connoisseur of esoteric doctrines and a scholar of Eastern and Western mysticism.

== Biography ==
Zolla was born in Turin to a cosmopolitan family. His father was the painter Venanzio Zolla (1880–1961), born in England of Lombard father and an Alsatian mother. His mother was Blanche Smith (1885–1951) a British musician, originally of Kent. Zolla spent his childhood between Paris, London, and Turin, speaking English, French, and Italian, while studying German and Spanish.

At age 22, he became ill with tuberculosis. During this illness he wrote a novel, Minuetto all'inferno [Minuet in Hell], published in 1956, which won the Strega Prize for a debut work. In 1957, he moved to Rome, where he worked in the drafting of Tempo presente [This Time]. In 1959, he published the essay Eclissi dell'intellettuale, an unconventional work in which, starting from a critique of mass society based on the analysis of Adorno and Horkheimer, also took a stand against political and cultural lobbies and progressive conformism.

In 1958, after ten years of engagement, he married the poet Maria Luisa Spaziani, but the marriage cracked almost immediately. From 1959, he was tied to the writer Cristina Campo (born Victoria Guerrini), with whom he lived until her death in 1977. In 1980, he married Grazia Marchianò, an orientalist and student of aesthetics.

In 1960, through the intervention of Mario Praz, he obtained a post in Language and Anglo-American Literature at the University of Rome. His lectures were attended by, among others, the young Roberto Calasso. From 1967, he taught as a Professor at University of Catania, then to Genoa (where he also taught Germanic Philology) and, from 1974, back to Rome.

From 1966 to 1968, he was secretary general of the Istituto Accademico di Roma and, from 1970 to 1973, was director of Istituto Ticinese di Alti Studi in Lugano.

In 1968, after a trip to the Southwestern United States, he wrote a history of the image of the Indian in American literature, I letterati e lo sciamano [The Scholar and The Shaman]. In later years he devoted himself to travel in India, Indonesia, China, Korea, and especially in Iran, which gave ample information in the book Aure.

In January 1969, he founded the magazine Conoscenza Religiosa [Religious Knowledge] (published by Nuova Italia), which he directed until 1983. It featured writings by intellectuals such as AJ Heschel, Jean Servier, Henry Corbin, Cristina Campo, Quirino Principe, Guido Ceronetti, Peter Citati, Sergio Quinzio, Margarete Riemschneider, Jorge Luis Borges, Hossein Nasr, Leo Schaya, Eugenio Montale, Giuseppe Dale, and Rosario Assunto. There were also published essays by Marcel Griaule.

In 1970, he wrote a controversial introduction to the first edition of The Lord of the Rings by Tolkien. In 1974, he presented the first global translation (by Peter Modesto) of the monumental work The Pillar and Ground of the Truth by the philosopher and mystic Russian Pavel Alexandrovich Florensky.

As a preface author and critic, Zolla wrote about Yakup Kadri Karaosmanoğlu, the Upanishads, The Imitation of Christ, Richard Rolle, Ioan Petru Culianu, Mircea Eliade, Thomas Mann, Marquis de Sade, Kafka, James Joyce, Emily Dickinson, Herman Melville (and oversaw a translation part of the poem Clarel), Nathaniel Hawthorne, Margery Kempe, F. Scott Fitzgerald, and other twentieth-century American writers.

In 1987, he won an International Prize from the city of Ascoli Piceno. Organized by the Medieval Studies Cecco d'Ascoli, a literary prize is awarded to a person in the field of medieval studies for international distinction in the creation of intellectual works that contribute to historical and value of historical research.

In 1991, he left university education, moved to Montepulciano (Siena), where he died 29 May 2002.

== Works ==
Eighty percent of Zolla's writings are in Italian; it is estimated that approximately ten percent are in English. The remaining works are in Spanish, French, and German.
