= Alessandro Parisotti =

Italian composer (1853–1913)

Alessandro Parisotti (24 July 1853 – 4 April 1913) was an Italian composer and music editor.

== Life and career ==
Though also a composer, Alessandro Parisotti is better known today as the original editor of a collection of songs known as Arie antiche (Arie antiche: ad una voce per canto e pianoforte, Milan, 1885–1888). The original collection comprises three volumes of songs or arias published as a primer to study classical singing, but the three volumes have since been reduced to single-volumed extracts known as the 24 Italian Songs and Arias. The original Arie Antiche are still available through Ricordi, Schirmer, and Kalmus.

Parisotti collected these antique arias (arie antiche is the Italian) in what was the 19th century vogue for discovering forgotten old or antique music from the classical and baroque eras. The most famous example of this practice of reclaiming forgotten music is Mendelssohn's revival of Bach's St. Matthew Passion in Berlin (1829). The taste for rediscovered music was de rigueur among musicians and audiences of the nineteenth century, with composers lesser than Mendelssohn and Brahms participating as well. Parisotti found forgotten scores and arranged their arias (or duets) for solo singer and piano accompaniment. Parisotti romanticized the pieces by altering word placement, chordal structure and/or adding ornamentation to the vocal line. Others also did this type of editing, including the publications done by Oliver Ditson. These arrangements are still favorites for recital programming today.

Notable students include pianist and composer Lucia Contini Anselmi.

In his collection, Parisotti attributed the song "Se tu m'ami" to Giovanni Battista Pergolesi, but as no early manuscripts of this song have been located, scholars now believe that Parisotti composed the piece himself. The text for the song was taken from a collection called "Di canzonette e di cantate librue due" by Paolo Rolli, published in London in 1727.
