= Guido Turchi =

Italian composer

Guido Turchi (10 November 1916 – 15 September 2010) was an Italian composer and writer on music.

Guido Turchi was born in Rome, where he later studied at the Conservatorio di Musica Santa Cecilia with Cesare Dobici, A. Ferdinandi, and Alessandro Bustini, and was awarded diplomas in piano and composition in 1940. In 1945 he achieved the highest possible marks in the advanced diploma course given by Ildebrando Pizzetti.

Like many Italian composers of his own and the preceding generation, he was not interested in continuing the tradition of his immediate predecessors of the 19th century, but rather turned to other, earlier sources: Gregorian plainchant, Renaissance madrigals, instrumental composers of the eighteenth century, and to non-Italian music of contemporary Europe. In his early works, Turchi employed a musical language sometimes close to the twelve-tone system, though he did not embrace it entirely. The neo-madrigalism fashionable at the time also marks his work, with particular influences from Goffredo Petrassi. Bartók's stamp is also prominent on works such as the Concerto breve (1947) for string quartet. The Piccolo concerto notturno (1950), combining a post-tonal style indebted to Paul Hindemith with bold neo-Impressionist colours, is one of his most successful pieces.

Turchi's only opera is the three-act Il buon soldato Svejk, to a libretto by Gerardo Guerrieri based on Jaroslav Hašek's Osudy dobrého vojáka Svejka za svetové války (The Adventures of the Good Soldier Svejk During the World War), first performed at La Scala in 1962 after a gestation period of almost ten years. It begins in a style reminiscent of Alban Berg's Wozzeck, and progresses to a lighter, more detached mood.

Turchi died in Venice in September 2010.
