= Cristina Campo =

Italian poet and writer (1923–1977)

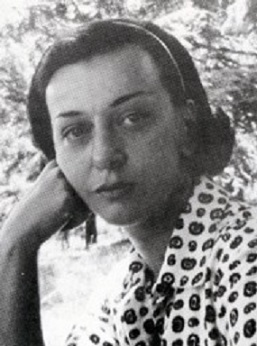
Campo c. late 1950s

Cristina Campo was the pen name of Vittoria Maria Angelica Marcella Cristina Guerrini (Bologna, April 29, 1923 – Rome, January 10, 1977), Italian writer, poet, and translator. She published under the pseudonyms Puccio Quaratesi, Bernardo Trevisano, Giusto Cabianca and Benedetto P. d'Angelo.

== Family and personal life ==
The daughter of musician and composer Guido Guerrini and Emilia Putti, she was born in Bologna and grew up in Florence. Due to a congenital cardiac malformation, which always made her health fragile, Cristina grew up isolated from her peers and could not follow regular school studies. Her mother died in 1964 and her father died the following year. She was so disturbed by these events that she left her home and moved first into a pension and then, in 1968, to an apartment near the benedictine Abbey of Sant'Anselmo in Rome. She died in Rome of a heart attack at the age of 53.

== Translation ==
She translated into Italian works by authors such as Katherine Mansfield, Virginia Woolf, Eduard Mörike, William Carlos Williams, John Donne, with a particular dedication to her translations of Hugo von Hofmannsthal and Simone Weil, whose work she introduced to the Italian public. She began to attend the salon of Anna Banti in Florence. She contributed to various publications including Paragone, Conoscenza religiosa and Questo e altro, and also started the column "Posta letteraria" in Corriere dell'Adda with Gianfranco Draghi.

== Poetry and religious activism ==
In 1955, she moved to Rome which marked a major change in her life. In 1956, she published a poetry collection Passo d'addio. From 1956 to 1961, she wrote a number of scripts for the Italian national radio system RAI. In Rome, she met Elémire Zolla. Cristina Campo was one of the founders of Una Voce, which was opposed to liturgical changes introduced in the Catholic church by the Second Vatican Council, she was also behind the Short Critical Study of the Novus Ordo Missae or also called the Ottaviani Intervention. she also contributed to Elemire Zolla's anthology I mistici dell'Occidente ed.

== Collected works ==
Her poetry and translations were later collected in La tigre assenza, first published in 1991. In 2020, the Nexus Institute published "The Unforgivables", an English translation of Campo's essay "Gli imperdonabili" by Will Schutt. In 2021, an annotated translation of "Gli imperdonabili" by Nicola Masciandaro and Andrea di Serego Alighieri was published in Glossator 11, Practice and Theory of the Commentary, a bilingual volume wholly dedicated to the work of the poet. In 2024, her essay collections Fairy Tale and Mystery (1962) and The Flute and the Carpet (1971) were brought together in a single volume in English translation published by New York Review Books.
