= Satyricon (opera) =

Chamber opera by Bruno Maderna

- Chamber opera by Bruno Maderna
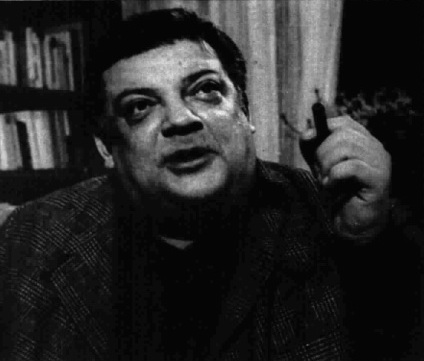
- Maderna in 1972
- Librettist: Ian Strasfogel
- Language: English; German; French; Latin
- Based on: Satyricon
- Premiere: 16 March 1973; Holland Festival, Scheveningen

Satyricon is a chamber opera by Bruno Maderna with a libretto adapted by Ian Strasfogel and the composer from Petronius's Satyricon. It was written during Maderna's last illness in 1973 and premièred as part of the Holland Festival on 16 March 1973, in Scheveningen, Netherlands.

The work consists of 16 unordered numbers (with the option of placing taped numbers between them) and the collage effect extends to the music, which relies heavily on pastiche. It is uncertain to what extent this "open" form was a product of the composer's inclination to semi-improvisational music theatre, or to the urgency of composition at a time when Maderna's terminal illness was increasingly becoming evident. There are four singers, employing respectively English and German, French, wordless vocalise, and Latin: the host Trimalchio (tenor, doubling as the merchant Habinnas), his wife Fortunata (mezzo-soprano), Criside (soprano), and Eumolpus (bass). At its premiere, the role of Fortunata was created by Débria Brown. It is suggested that tape music may be used between scenes; the 2004 production in Darmstadt included dialogue and a number of additional spoken roles.(
