= Giovanni Sgambati =

Italian musician

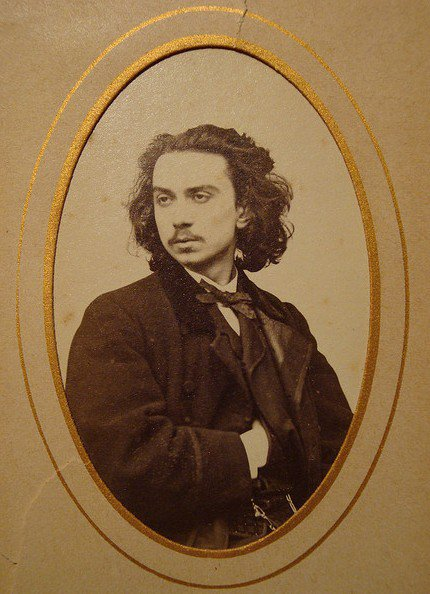
Giovanni Sgambati as a young man

Giovanni Sgambati (28 May 1841 – 14 December 1914) was an Italian pianist and composer.

== Biography ==
Born in Rome, to an Italian father and an English mother, Sgambati, who lost his father early, received his early education at Trevi, in Umbria, where he wrote some church music and obtained experience as a singer and conductor. In 1860 he settled in Rome, and took up the work of winning acceptance for the best German music, then little known in Italy. The influence and support of Franz Liszt, who was in Rome from 1861, was naturally of great advantage to him, and concerts were given in which Sgambati conducted as well as played the piano.

His compositions at this period (1864–1865) included a quartet, two piano quintets, an octet, and an overture. He conducted Liszt's Dante Symphony on 26 February 1866 at the opening of the Sala di Dante at the Palazzo Poli, with 27 of Filippo Bigioli's paintings exhibited nearby. He made the acquaintance of Richard Wagner's music for the first time in Munich, where he travelled in Liszt's company. His first album of songs appeared in 1870 (Schott Music), and his first symphony was played at the Palazzo del Quirinale in 1881; this, as well as a piano concerto, was performed in the course of his first visit to England in 1882; and at his second visit, in 1891, his Sinfonia epitalamio was given at the Philharmonic.

His most extensive work, a Requiem Mass, was performed in Rome in 1901. His many pianoforte works have won permanent success. Sgambati was also active in the contemporary musical scene as a promoter of the music of others and, among these, Dante Alderighi. He conducted the Italian premieres of Beethoven's third and of seventh symphonies (in 1867 and 1870 respectively). He also conducted the Italian premieres of more recent works such as Liszt's Dante Symphony and Christus oratorio.

He died in Rome, aged 73. Notable students include pianist and composer Lucia Contini Anselmi, contralto Mary Augusta Wakefield and composer and conductor Alessandro Bustini. See: List of music students by teacher: R to S#Giovanni Sgambati.

== Selected works ==
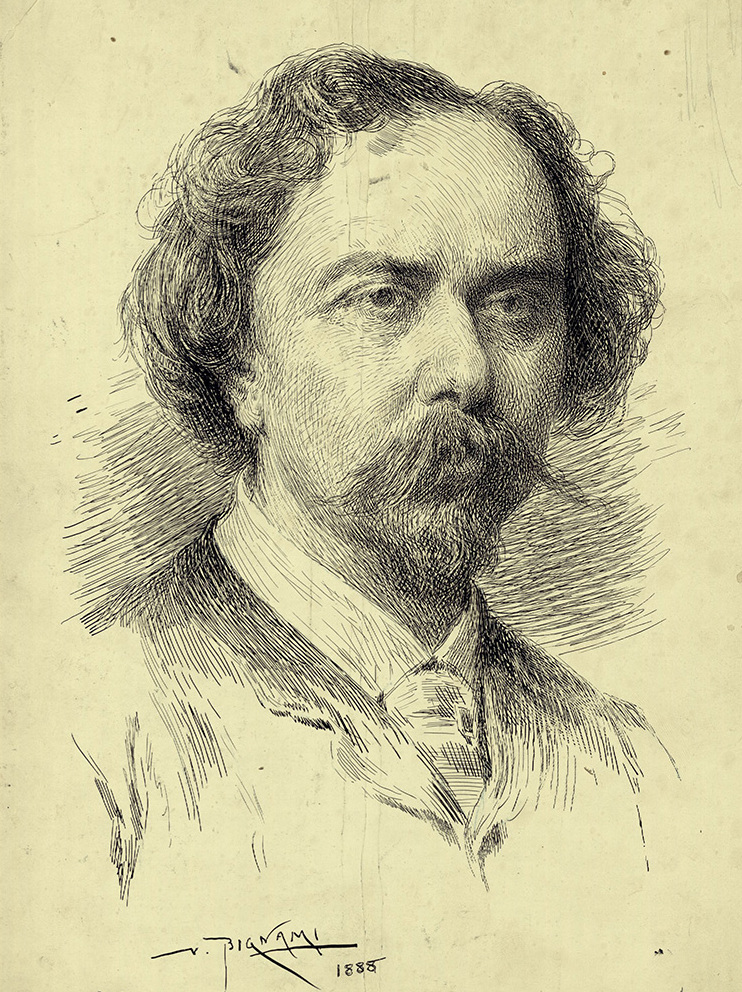
Portrait of Giovanni Sgambati by Vespasiano Bignami (1888)

=== Orchestral ===
- Cola di Rienzo Overture (1866)
- Piano Concerto in G minor, Op. 15 (1878–1880)
- Symphony No. 1 in D major, Op. 16 (1880–1881)
- Symphony No. 2 in E♭ major (1883–1885)
- Symphony No. 3, "Sinfonia Epitalamio" (1888)

=== Chamber music ===
- String Quartet in D minor (1864)
- Piano Quintet No. 1 in F minor, Op. 4 (1866)
- Piano Quintet No. 2 in B♭, Op. 5
- String Quartet in C♯ minor, Op. 17 (1882)
- Two Pieces for violin and piano, Op. 24 (1890)
- Gondoliera for violin and piano, Op. 29 (1894)

=== Piano ===
- Prélude et Fugue, Op. 6
- Deux Études de concert, Op. 10
- Fogli Volanti, Op. 12
- Gavotte in A♭ minor, Op.14 (1880)
- Quattro pezzi di seguito, Op. 18
- 3 Notturni, Op. 20 (B minor, G, C minor) (1873–87)
- Suite in B minor, Op. 21 (1888)
- Pièces Lyriques, Op. 23
- Mélodies poétiques, Op. 36
- Trois morceaux, Op. 42 (1909–10): No. 1. Prelude in C♯ minor; No. 2. Berceuse-Rêverie in G♭; No. 3. Melodia campestre (Impromptu) in F
- Étude triomphale in A, Op. posth.
- Sérénade valsée in A♭, Op. posth.
- Melody from "Orfeo ed Euridice" (transcription for solo piano of "Dance of the Blessed Spirits" from Gluck's opera)

=== Sacred music ===
- Messa da Requiem, Op. 38 (1895–1901)

== General references ==
- Antolini, Bianca Maria; Bini, Annalisa, eds. (2018). Giovanni Sgambati : musicista dell'avvenire o epigono romantico? [Giovanni Sgambati: Musician of the Future or Romantic Follower?]. L'arte armonia. Serie III, Studi e testi (in Italian). Rome: Accademia nazionale di Santa Cecilia. ISBN 9788895341965. OCLC 1141042004.
