= Goffredo Petrassi =

Italian composer of modern classical music, conductor and teacher

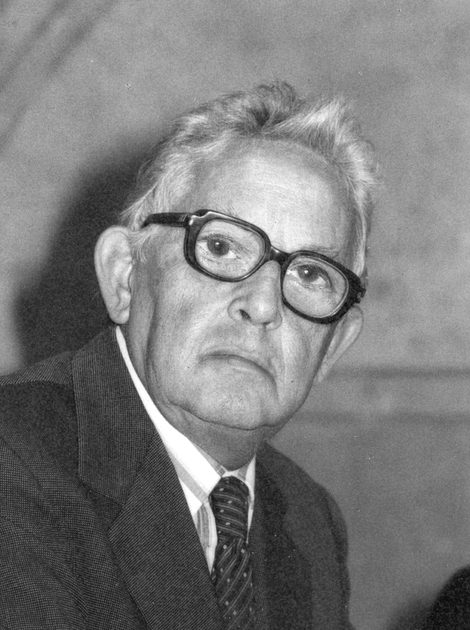
Petrassi

Goffredo Petrassi (16 July 1904 – 3 March 2003) was an Italian composer of modern classical music, conductor, and teacher. He is considered one of the most influential Italian composers of the twentieth century.

== Life ==
Petrassi was born at Zagarolo, near Rome. At the age of 15 he began to work at a music shop to supply his family's financial needs, and became fascinated by music. In 1928, he entered the Santa Cecilia Conservatory in Rome to study organ and composition for five years under Vincenzo di Donato. There he studied fugue and composition with Alessandro Bustini, who had earlier given him private piano lessons and encouraged him to turn to composition. In 1933, composer Alfredo Casella conducted Petrassi's Partita for orchestra at the ISCM festival in Amsterdam.

From 1940 to 1960 Petrassi was professor of composition at the Santa Cecilia Conservatory; later, he also became musical director of the opera house La Fenice, and from 1960 to 1978 he taught in the master courses in composition at the Accademia di Santa Cecilia. He was also a teacher at the Salzburg Mozarteum. Petrassi had many famous students, including Franco Donatoni, Aldo Clementi, Cornelius Cardew, Ennio Morricone, Karl Korte, Boris Porena, Norma Beecroft, Mario Bertoncini, Ernesto Rubin de Cervin, Eric Salzman, Kenneth Leighton, Peter Maxwell Davies, Michael Dellaira, Armando Santiago, and Richard Teitelbaum. See: List of music students by teacher: N to Q#Goffredo Petrassi. Petrassi died in Rome at the age of 98.

== Music ==
Petrassi's early work was part of an attempt by several Italian composers to create a national "Italian" revival in classical music, corresponding to the romantic work of Germans such as Richard Wagner. During this time, his work was characteristically neoclassical in style, influenced by Bartók, Hindemith and Stravinsky.

In later years, Petrassi's open musical mind and acute personality led him to experiment with different post-Webernian influences and a wide range of poetic materials, from Latin hymns to Ariosto's La follia d'Orlando and Ritratto di Don Chisciotte (Portrait of Don Quixote), based on the Miguel de Cervantes literary character. All these influences are present in a remarkable series of eight Concerti for Orchestra which he composed between 1934 and 1972. His music appears on the CD labels Chandos, Stradivarius, Naxos, and Capriccio.

Petrassi stopped composing in 1986 due to progressive loss of eyesight.

== Works ==
- Sinfonia, Siciliana e Fuga per Quartetto d'Archi (1929)
- Partita for Orchestra (1932)
- Preludio, Aria, e Finale for Cello and Piano (1933)
- Concerto for Orchestra (1934)
- Psalm IX (1934–36)
- Piano Concerto (1936–39)
- Magnificat (1939–40)
- Coro di Morti (1941)
- Quatro inni Sacri (1942–50)
- La follia di Orlando (1942–43) (also as a symphonic suite)
- Ritratto di Don Chisciotte (1945)
- Il Cordovano (1948)
- Dialogo Angelico (1948) Flute Duo
- Morte dell'aria (1950)
- Noche Oscura (1950–51)
- Concerto for Orchestra No. 2 (1951)
- Concerto for Orchestra No. 3 (1953)
- Concerto for Orchestra No. 4 (1954)
- Concerto for Orchestra No. 5 (1955)
- Concerto for Orchestra No. 6 (1956–57)
- Quartetto per Archi (String Quartet) (1957)
- Serenata (1957)
- Trio per Archi (String Trio) (1959)
- Flute Concerto (1960)
- Concerto for Orchestra No. 7 (1963–64)
- Concerto for Orchestra No. 8 (1970–72)
- Orationes Christi (1975)
- Grand Septuor avec clarinette concertante per sette esecutori (1977-1978)
- Kyrie (1990)
