= Accademia Filarmonica Romana =

Italian musical institution

The Accademia Filarmonica Romana (translated as Philharmonic Academy Of Rome or Roman Philharmonic Academy) is a musical institution based in Rome, Italy. It was established in 1821 by a group of upper class amateur musicians led by the Marquis Raffaele Muti Papazzurri (1801–1858) in order to encourage the performance of chamber music and symphony, and to perform in concert operas whose representation was hampered by censorship.

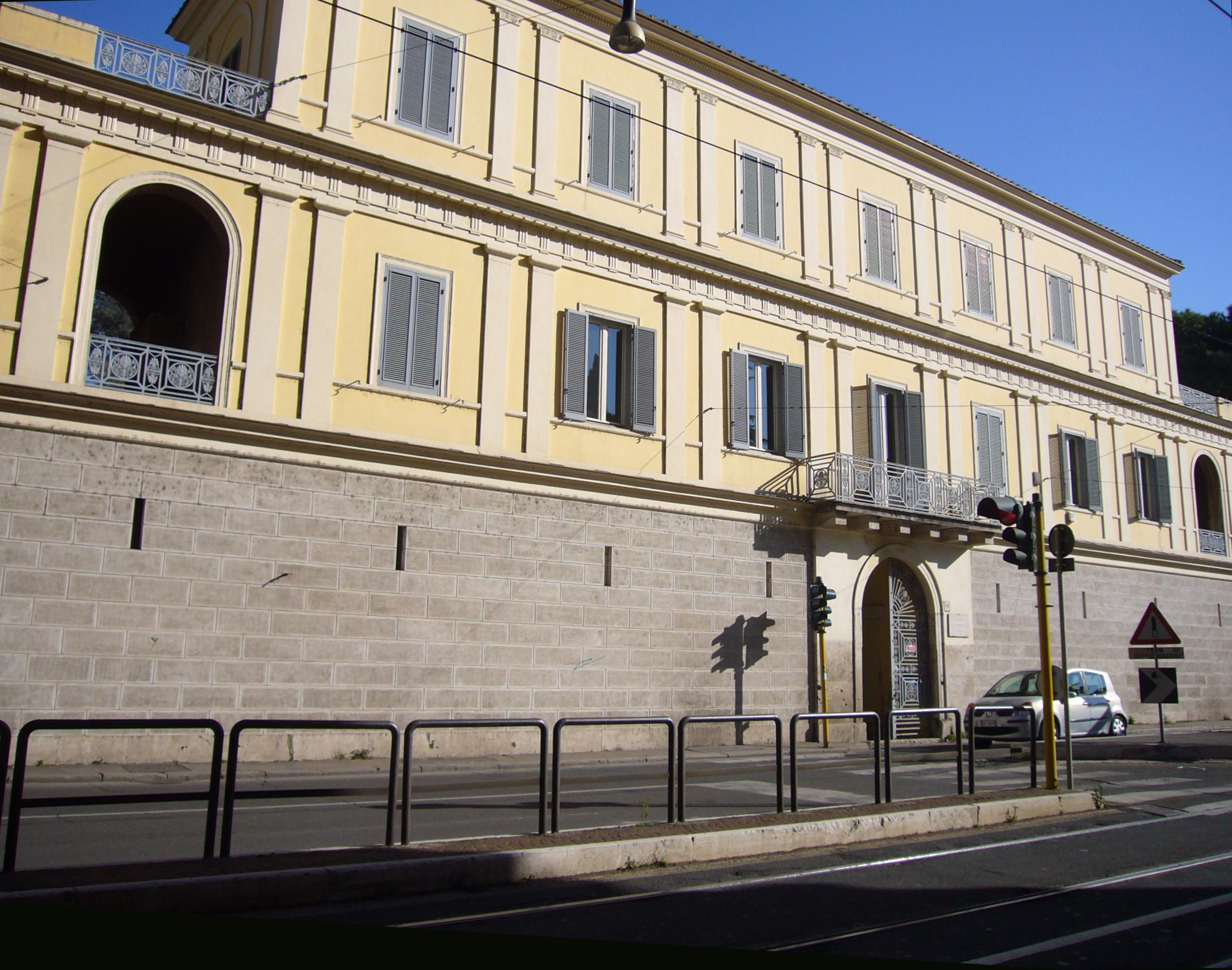
Via Flaminia - Accademia Filarmonica romana

In 1824, it became an official institution of the Papal States with the aim of "training students to the exercise of the vocal and instrumental music."

The Academy suspended its activities between 1849 and 1856 for economic difficulties, and in 1860 it was disbanded by the papal government, as many of its members were accused of having liberal ideas. It resumed its activities in 1870. Gaetano Donizetti collaborated with the institution by composing a part of a cantata which was commissioned by the Academy, Il genio dell'Armonia in omaggio a Pio VIII, and conducting Anna Bolena in 1833.
