= Conservatorio Santa Cecilia =

State conservatory in Rome, Italy

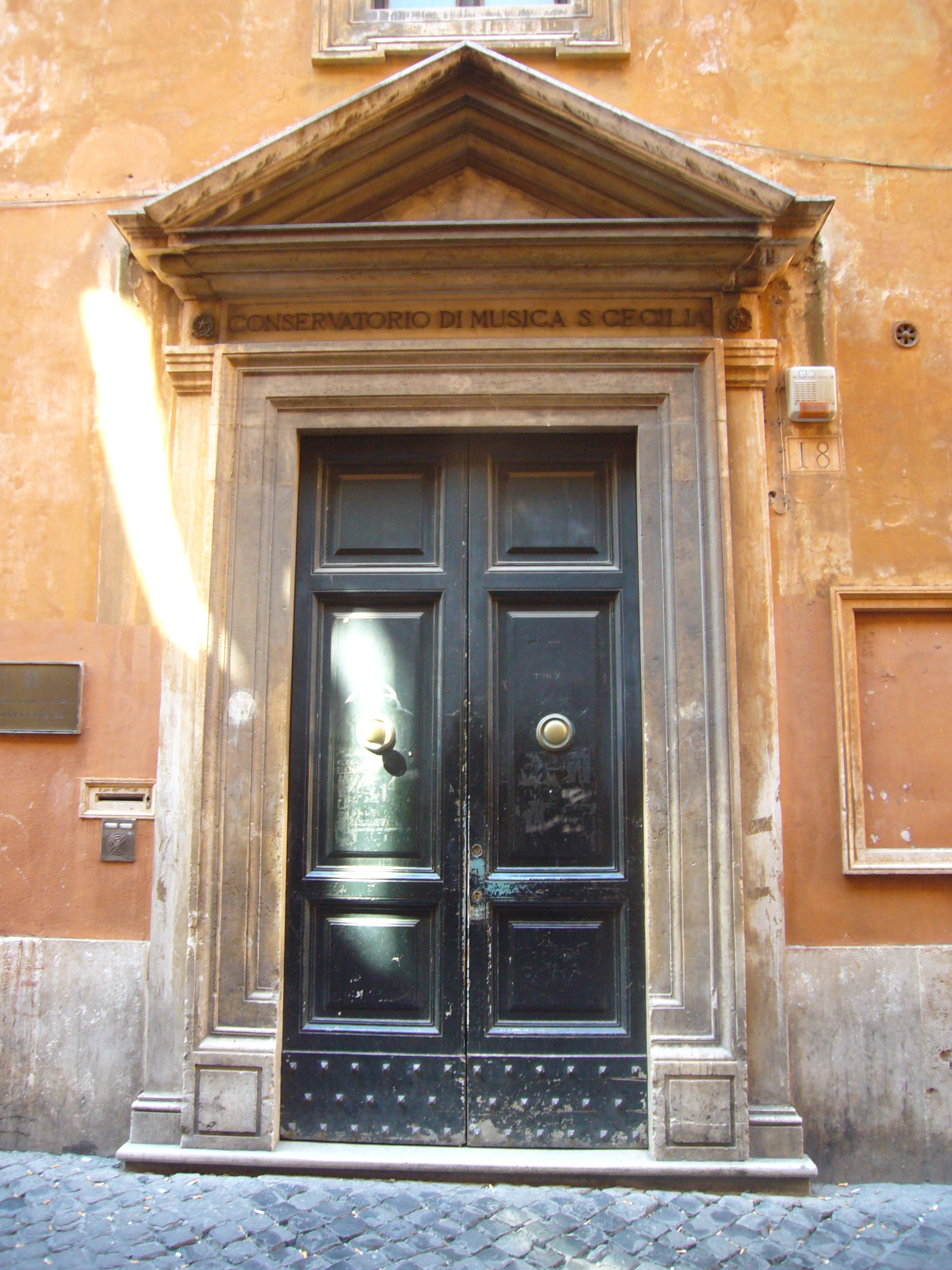
- Entrance of the conservatory
- Type: Public
- Established: 1870; 155 years ago
- Location: Rome, Lazio, Italy
- Website: conservatoriosantacecilia.it

The Conservatorio di Musica Santa Cecilia is a state conservatory in Rome.

== History ==
The institution has its roots dated back to the Congregazione de' musici di Roma named after Saint Cecilia in 1565 (now Accademia Nazionale di Santa Cecilia). Since the early 19th century there had been the need for a music school in the institution. It was only due to the pianist Giovanni Sgambati that led to the opening of the musical institute on 23 May 1870.

In 1911, the Liceo Musicale became an independent entity and was nationalized in 1919. Only after, it assumed its current name.

Since the 2008/09 academic year, the conservatory also operates at the Parco della Musica Villa Battistini in Rieti. The branch at Sant'Andrea delle Fratte was inaugurated on 1 October 2013.

In February 2019 the Conservatory celebrated the bestowing of the Honor Degree to the Former Minister of Education Luigi Berlinguer and the Award of the two best Alumni Francesco Marini (cello) and Gregorio Maria Paone (clarinet).

On 29 January 2020, following the confirmation of the first cases of COVID-19 in Italy, the director of the conservatory Roberto Giuliani suspended lessons for "Oriental" students, with a requirement for a doctor's visit in order for students to return.

== Bibliography ==
- Carboni, Domenico (2017). Storia del Conservatorio di musica "Santa Cecilia" di Roma. Varese: Zecchini Editore. ISBN 9788865401835.
