= Ghali discography =

- Studio albums: 4
- Compilation albums: 1
- Singles: 23

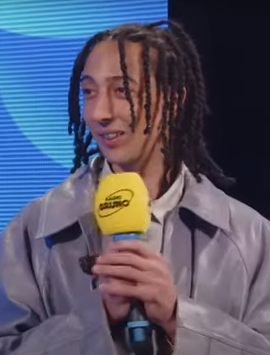
Ghali interviewed by Radio Bruno in 2024

The discography of Italian rapper Ghali consists of four studio albums, one compilation album and twenty-three singles as primary artist.

== Albums ==
=== Studio albums ===
List of studio albums, with chart positions and certifications
Title	Details	Peak chart positions			Certifications
Title	Details	ITA	BEL (Wa)	SWI	Certifications
Album	Released: 26 May 2017; Label: Sto Records; Format: CD, LP, digital download, streaming	2	96	24	FIMI: 4× Platinum
DNA	Released: 21 January 2020; Label: Sto; Format: CD, LP, digital download, streaming	1	—	19	FIMI: 3× Platinum
Sensazione ultra	Released: 20 May 2022; Label: Sto, Warner, Atlantic; Format: CD, LP, digital download, streaming	2	—	67	FIMI: Platinum
Pizza kebab Vol. 1	Released: 1 December 2023; Label: Sto, Warner, Atlantic; Format: CD, LP, digital download, streaming	5	—	66	FIMI: Gold

=== Compilation albums ===
List of compilation albums, with chart positions and certifications
Title	Year	Peak position	Certification
Title	Year	ITA	Certification
Lunga vita a Sto	Released: 24 November 2017; Label: Sto; Format: CD, LP, digital download, streaming	25	FIMI: Gold

== Singles ==
=== As lead artist ===
List of singles as lead artist, with selected chart positions, showing year released and album name
Title	Year	Peak chart positions		Certifications	Album
Title	Year	ITA	SWI	Certifications	Album
"Dende"	2016	63	—	FIMI: Platinum	Lunga vita a Sto
"Ninna nanna"	2016	1	—	FIMI: 4× Platinum	Album
"Pizza kebab"	2017	3	—	FIMI: 2× Platinum	Album
"Happy Days"	2017	4	—	FIMI: 4× Platinum	Album
"Habibi"	2017	7	—	FIMI: 4× Platinum	Album
"Cara Italia"	2018	1	73	FIMI: 3× Platinum	Album
"Peace & Love" (with Charlie Charles and Sfera Ebbasta)	2018	1	31	FIMI: 3× Platinum	Non-album singles
"Zingarello" (featuring Sick Luke)	2018	4	—	FIMI: Gold	Non-album singles
"I Love You"	2019	10	—	FIMI: Platinum	Non-album singles
"Turbococco"	2019	45	—	FIMI: Gold	Non-album singles
"Hasta la vista"	2019	44	—		Non-album singles
"Flashback"	2019	5	—	FIMI: Gold	DNA
"Boogieman" (featuring Salmo)	2020	1	—	FIMI: 2× Platinum	DNA
"Good Times"	2020	1	—	FIMI: 4× Platinum	DNA
"Barcellona"	2020	23	—	FIMI: Platinum	DNA
"Mille pare (Bad Times)"	2020	—	—		DNA Deluxe X
"Chiagne ancora" (featuring Liberato and J Lord)	2021	76	—		Non-album single
"Wallah"	2021	27	—	FIMI: Platinum	Sensazione ultra
"Walo"	2022	—	—		Sensazione ultra
"Fortuna"	2022	24	—	FIMI: Platinum	Sensazione ultra
"Pare" (featuring Madame)	2022	29	—	FIMI: 2× Platinum	Sensazione ultra
"Casa mia"	2024	5	25	FIMI: 3× Platinum	TBA
"Paprika"	2024	3	—	FIMI: 2× Platinum	TBA
"Niente panico"	2024	14	—	FIMI: Gold	TBA
"Chill"	2025	40	—		TBA

=== As featured artist ===
List of singles as featured artist, with selected chart positions, showing year released and album name
Title	Year	Peak chart positions		Certifications	Album
Title	Year	ITA	SWI	Certifications	Album
"Bimbi" (Charlie Charles featuring Izi, Rkomi, Sfera Ebbasta, Tedua and Ghali)	2017	3	—	FIMI: 2× Platinum	Non-album singles
"Defuera" (Dardust featuring Ghali, Madame and Marracash)	2020	33	—	FIMI: Platinum	Non-album singles
"Puta" (SixPM featuring Ghali and Gué)	2023	40	—	FIMI: Gold	Non-album singles
"Obladi oblada" (Charlie Charles featuring Ghali, Thasup and Fabri Fibra)	2023	43	—		Non-album singles
"Baba" (Manal featuring Ghali)	2023	—	—		Non-album singles
"Kiss Kiss" (Digital Astro featuring Ghali and Tony Boy)	2024	—	—		Non-album singles
"—" denotes a recording that did not chart or was not released in that territory.

== Other charted songs ==
Year	Title	Peak positions	Certification	Album
Year	Title	ITA	Certification	Album
2017	"Ricchi dentro"	6	FIMI: 2× Platinum	Album
2017	"Lacrime"	14	FIMI: Platinum	Album
2017	"Milano"	20	FIMI: Gold	Album
2017	"Boulevard"	23	FIMI: Platinum	Album
2017	"Vida"	28	FIMI: Platinum	Album
2017	"Liberté"	30	FIMI: Gold	Album
2017	"Oggi no"	32	FIMI: Platinum	Album
2017	"Ora d'aria"	37	FIMI: Gold	Album
2020	"Giù x terra"	46		DNA
2020	"DNA"	19		DNA
2020	"Jennifer" (feat. Soolking)	23		DNA
2020	"22:22"	20	FIMI: Gold	DNA
2020	"Fast Food"	28		DNA
2020	"Marymango" (feat. Tha Supreme)	6	FIMI: Gold	DNA
2020	"Combo" (feat. Mr Eazi)	57		DNA
2020	"Extasi"	55		DNA
2020	"Barcellona"	40	FIMI: Platinum	DNA
2020	"Cuore a destra"	47		DNA
2020	"Scooby"	62		DNA
2020	"Fallito"	63		DNA
2020	"Cacao" (feat. Pyrex)	63	FIMI: Gold	DNA
2020	"Milf" (feat. Taxi B)	30		DNA
2022	"Free Solo" (feat. Marracash)	44		Sensazione ultra
2022	"Drari" (feat. Baby Gang)	95		Sensazione ultra
