= List of number-one hits of 2020 (Italy) =

This is a list of the number-one hits of 2020 on Italy's Singles and Albums Charts, ranked by the Federazione Industria Musicale Italiana (FIMI).

== Chart history ==
Week	Issue date	Song	Artist(s)	Ref.	Album	Artist(s)	Ref.
1	3 January	"Blun7 a Swishland"	Tha Supreme		23 6451	Tha Supreme	
2	10 January	"Blun7 a Swishland"	Tha Supreme		Cip!	Brunori Sas	
3	17 January	"Boogieman"	Ghali featuring Salmo		Cip!	Brunori Sas	
4	24 January	"Calmo"	Shiva and Tha Supreme		ReAle	J-Ax	
5	31 January	"Chance"	Shiva featuring Capo Plaza		ReAle	J-Ax	
6	7 February	"Fai rumore"	Diodato		Sanremo 2020	Various artists	
7	14 February	"Fai rumore"	Diodato		Il Fantadisco dei Me contro Te: canta con Luì e Sofì	Me contro Te	
8	21 February	"Good Times"	Ghali		DNA	Ghali	
9	28 February	"Bando"	Anna		Il Fantadisco dei Me contro Te: canta con Luì e Sofì	Me contro Te	
10	6 March	"Bando"	Anna		Garbage	Nitro	
11	13 March	"Bando"	Anna		DNA	Ghali	
12	20 March	"Blinding Lights"	The Weeknd		After Hours	The Weeknd	
13	27 March	"Auto blu"	Shiva and Eiffel 65		Gigaton	Pearl Jam	
14	3 April	"Auto blu"	Shiva and Eiffel 65		Persona	Marracash	
15	10 April	"Le feste di Pablo"	Cara and Fedez		Persona	Marracash	
16	17 April	"Auto blu"	Shiva and Eiffel 65		Persona	Marracash	
17	24 April	"Bando (Remix)"	Anna, Madman and Gemitaiz		Persona	Marracash	
18	1 May	"Good Times"	Ghali		DNA	Ghali	
19	8 May	"Pussy"	Dark Polo Gang and Tony Effe featuring Lazza and Salmo		Dark Boys Club	Dark Polo Gang	
20	15 May	"Spigoli"	Carl Brave, Mara Sattei and Tha Supreme		Dark Boys Club	Dark Polo Gang	
21	22 May	"Mediterranea"	Irama		Elo	DrefGold	
22	29 May	"Mediterranea"	Irama		Chromatica	Lady Gaga	
23	5 June	"Mediterranea"	Irama		Vita Vera Mixtape	Tedua	
24	12 June	"M' manc"	Shablo, Geolier and Sfera Ebbasta		Vita Vera Mixtape: Aspettando La Divina Commedia	Tedua	
25	19 June	"Mediterranea"	Irama		Gemelli	Ernia	
26	26 June	"Karaoke"	Boomdabash and Alessandra Amoroso		Mr. Fini	Gué Pequeno	
27	3 July	"Karaoke"	Boomdabash and Alessandra Amoroso		Mr. Fini	Gué Pequeno	
28	10 July	"Karaoke"	Boomdabash and Alessandra Amoroso		Mr. Fini	Gué Pequeno	
29	17 July	"Karaoke"	Boomdabash and Alessandra Amoroso		J	Lazza	
30	24 July	"A un passo dalla luna"	Rocco Hunt and Ana Mena		1990	Achille Lauro	
31	31 July	"A un passo dalla luna"	Rocco Hunt and Ana Mena		Vita Vera Mixtape: Aspettando La Divina Commedia	Tedua	
32	7 August	"A un passo dalla luna"	Rocco Hunt and Ana Mena		Mr. Fini	Gué Pequeno	
33	14 August	"A un passo dalla luna"	Rocco Hunt and Ana Mena		Mr. Fini	Gué Pequeno	
34	21 August	"A un passo dalla luna"	Rocco Hunt and Ana Mena		Mr. Fini	Gué Pequeno	
35	28 August	"A un passo dalla luna"	Rocco Hunt and Ana Mena		Crepe	Irama	
36	4 September	"A un passo dalla luna"	Rocco Hunt and Ana Mena		Buongiorno	Gigi D'Alessio	
37	11 September	"A un passo dalla luna"	Rocco Hunt and Ana Mena		Padre figlio e spirito	FSK Satellite	
38	18 September	"A un passo dalla luna"	Rocco Hunt and Ana Mena		17	Emis Killa and Jake La Furia	
39	25 September	"Superclassico"	Ernia		17	Emis Killa and Jake La Furia	
40	2 October	"Altalene"	Bloody Vinyl, Slait and Tha Supreme featuring Mara Sattei and Coez		BV3	Bloody Vinyl	
41	9 October	"Superclassico"	Ernia		BV3	Bloody Vinyl	
42	16 October	"Superclassico"	Ernia		BV3	Bloody Vinyl	
43	23 October	"Bottiglie privè"	Sfera Ebbasta		Letter to You	Bruce Springsteen	
44	30 October	"Bottiglie privè"	Sfera Ebbasta		Zerosettanta - Volume 2	Renato Zero	
45	6 November	"Bottiglie privè"	Sfera Ebbasta		Accetto miracoli: L'esperienza degli altri	Tiziano Ferro	
46	13 November	"Bottiglie privè"	Sfera Ebbasta		Power Up	AC/DC	
47	20 November	"Baby"	Sfera Ebbasta and J Balvin		Famoso	Sfera Ebbasta	
48	27 November	"Baby"	Sfera Ebbasta and J Balvin		Famoso	Sfera Ebbasta	
49	4 December	"All I Want for Christmas Is You"	Mariah Carey		7	Ligabue	
50	11 December	"Baby"	Sfera Ebbasta and J Balvin		7	Ligabue	
51	18 December	"All I Want for Christmas Is You"	Mariah Carey		7	Ligabue	
52	25 December	"All I Want for Christmas Is You"	Mariah Carey		Famoso	Sfera Ebbasta	

== See also ==
- 2020 in music
- List of number-one hits in Italy
