= List of number-one hits of 2018 (Italy) =

This is a list of the number-one hits of 2018 on Italy's Singles and Albums Charts, ranked by the Federazione Industria Musicale Italiana (FIMI).

== Chart history ==
| Week | Issue date | Song | Artist(s) | Ref. | Album | Artist(s) | Ref. |
|---|---|---|---|---|---|---|---|
| 1 | 5 January | "Perfect" | Ed Sheeran | | ÷ | Ed Sheeran | |
| 2 | 12 January | "Perfect" | Ed Sheeran | | No Comment | Nitro | |
| 3 | 19 January | "Cupido" | Sfera Ebbasta featuring Quavo | | Rockstar | Sfera Ebbasta | |
| 4 | 26 January | "Cara Italia" | Ghali | | Rockstar | Sfera Ebbasta | |
| 5 | 2 February | "Cara Italia" | Ghali | | Back Home | MadMan | |
| 6 | 9 February | "Una vita in vacanza" | Lo Stato Sociale | | Non abbiamo armi | Ermal Meta | |
| 7 | 16 February | "Una vita in vacanza" | Lo Stato Sociale | | Rockstar | Sfera Ebbasta | |
| 8 | 23 February | "Cara Italia" | Ghali | | Rockstar | Sfera Ebbasta | |
| 9 | 2 March | "Cara Italia" | Ghali | | Siamo solo soli | Benji & Fede | |
| 10 | 9 March | "God's Plan" | Drake | | Mowgli – Il disco della giungla | Tedua | |
| 11 | 16 March | "God's Plan" | Drake | | Fatti sentire | Laura Pausini | |
| 12 | 23 March | "Malibu" | Vegas Jones | | Maeba | Mina | |
| 13 | 30 March | "Malibu" | Vegas Jones | | Fatti sentire | Laura Pausini | |
| 14 | 6 April | "Non cambierò mai" | Capo Plaza | | Fatti sentire | Laura Pausini | |
| 15 | 13 April | "X" | Nicky Jam and J Balvin | | Enemy | Noyz Narcos | |
| 16 | 20 April | "Tesla" | Capo Plaza featuring Sfera Ebbasta and DrefGold | | Davide | Gemitaiz | |
| 17 | 27 April | "Tesla" | Capo Plaza featuring Sfera Ebbasta and DrefGold | | Davide | Gemitaiz | |
| 18 | 4 May | "Peace & Love" | Charlie Charles, Sfera Ebbasta and Ghali | | 20 | Capo Plaza | |
| 19 | 11 May | "British" | Dark Polo Gang | | Notti brave | Carl Brave | |
| 20 | 18 May | "Italiana" | J-Ax and Fedez | | Notti brave | Carl Brave | |
| 21 | 25 May | "Italiana" | J-Ax and Fedez | | Evergreen | Calcutta | |
| 22 | 1 June | "Italiana" | J-Ax and Fedez | | Plume | Irama | |
| 23 | 8 June | "Italiana" | J-Ax and Fedez | | Plume | Irama | |
| 24 | 15 June | "Amore e capoeira" | Takagi & Ketra featuring Giusy Ferreri and Sean Kingston | | Plume | Irama | |
| 25 | 22 June | "Amore e capoeira" | Takagi & Ketra featuring Giusy Ferreri and Sean Kingston | | Plume | Irama | |
| 26 | 29 June | "Amore e capoeira" | Takagi & Ketra featuring Giusy Ferreri and Sean Kingston | | Plume | Irama | |
| 27 | 6 July | "Amore e capoeira" | Takagi & Ketra featuring Giusy Ferreri and Sean Kingston | | Plume | Irama | |
| 28 | 13 July | "Amore e capoeira" | Takagi & Ketra featuring Giusy Ferreri and Sean Kingston | | Plume | Irama | |
| 29 | 20 July | "Pablo" | Rvssian and Sfera Ebbasta | | Plume | Irama | |
| 30 | 27 July | "Amore e capoeira" | Takagi & Ketra featuring Giusy Ferreri and Sean Kingston | | Plume | Irama | |
| 31 | 3 August | "Amore e capoeira" | Takagi & Ketra featuring Giusy Ferreri and Sean Kingston | | Astroworld | Travis Scott | |
| 32 | 10 August | "Amore e capoeira" | Takagi & Ketra featuring Giusy Ferreri and Sean Kingston | | Plume | Irama | |
| 33 | 17 August | "Amore e capoeira" | Takagi & Ketra featuring Giusy Ferreri and Sean Kingston | | Sweetener | Ariana Grande | |
| 34 | 24 August | "Amore e capoeira" | Takagi & Ketra featuring Giusy Ferreri and Sean Kingston | | Sweetener | Ariana Grande | |
| 35 | 31 August | "Amore e capoeira" | Takagi & Ketra featuring Giusy Ferreri and Sean Kingston | | Kamikaze | Eminem | |
| 36 | 7 September | "Trap Phone" | Gué Pequeno featuring Capo Plaza | | 68 | Ernia | |
| 37 | 14 September | "Borsello" | Gué Pequeno featuring Sfera Ebbasta and DrefGold | | Sinatra | Gué Pequeno | |
| 38 | 21 September | "90min" | Salmo | | Love | Thegiornalisti | |
| 39 | 28 September | "Torna a casa" | Måneskin | | Trap Lovers | Dark Polo Gang | |
| 40 | 5 October | "Torna a casa" | Måneskin | | 10 | Alessandra Amoroso | |
| 41 | 12 October | "Torna a casa" | Måneskin | | Supereroe | Emis Killa | |
| 42 | 19 October | "Torna a casa" | Måneskin | | Giovani | Irama | |
| 43 | 26 October | "Torna a casa" | Måneskin | | Il ballo della vita | Måneskin | |
| 44 | 2 November | "Prima di ogni cosa" | Fedez | | Siamo solo noise | Benji & Fede | |
| 45 | 9 November | "Cabriolet" | Salmo featuring Sfera Ebbasta | | Playlist | Salmo | |
| 46 | 16 November | "Torna a casa" | Måneskin | | Playlist | Salmo | |
| 47 | 23 November | "La fine del mondo" | Anastasio | | Vita ce n'è | Eros Ramazzotti | |
| 48 | 30 November | "Happy Birthday" | Sfera Ebbasta | | Atlantico | Marco Mengoni | |
| 49 | 7 December | "Il cielo nella stanza" | Salmo featuring Nstasia | | Fatti sentire ancora | Laura Pausini | |
| 50 | 14 December | "La fine del mondo" | Anastasio | | Atlantico | Marco Mengoni | |
| 51 | 21 December | "Il cielo nella stanza" | Salmo featuring Nstasia | | Atlantico | Marco Mengoni | |
| 52 | 28 December | "Il cielo nella stanza" | Salmo featuring Nstasia | | Playlist | Salmo | |

== See also ==
- 2018 in music
- List of number-one hits in Italy
