= Rosa Chemical discography =

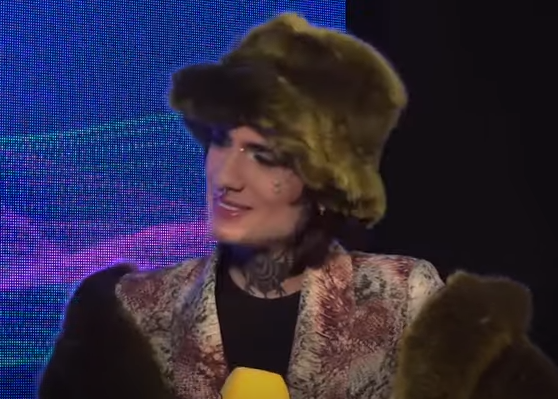
- Rosa Chemical in February 2023
- Studio albums: 1
- EPs: 3
- Mixtapes: 1
- Singles: 38
- Music videos: 23

The discography of Italian rapper Rosa Chemical consists of one studio album, one mixtape, three EPs and thirty-eight singles.

== Studio albums ==
List of studio albums with album details
Title	Album details	Peak chart positions	Certifications
Title	Album details	ITA	Certifications
Forever	Released: 28 May 2020; Label: Thaurus Music, Universal Music Group, Island Records	8	FIMI: Gold

== Extended plays ==
List of EPs with details
Title	EPs details
Caos calmo (Note: Credited as Ekios.) (featuring Nover)	Released: 2015; Label: Independent
Okay okay!!	Released: 8 March 2019; Label: Thaurus Music, Universal Music Group
Okay okay 2	Released: 16 May 2025; Label: Universal Music Group

== Mixtape albums ==
List of mixtape albums with album details
Title	Mixtape details
Paranoise Mixtape (Note: Credited as Kranyo.)	Released: 2015; Label: Independent

== Singles ==
=== As lead artist ===
List of singles as lead artist, with selected chart positions, showing year released and album name
Title	Year	Peak chart positions	Certifications	Album
Title	Year	ITA	Certifications	Album
"Latte +" (Note: Credited as Ekios.)	2015	—		Non-album singles
"C.A.S" (Note: Credited as Kranyo.) (featuring Thetesto)	2016	—		Non-album singles
"Acqua Panna"	2017	—		Non-album singles
"Punk 'a piana"	2018	—		Non-album singles
"Lil Peep"	2018	—		Non-album singles
"Rosa Chemical"	2018	—		Non-album singles
"Kournikova"	2018	—		Non-album singles
"Luciano Pavarotty // Glock"	2018	—		Non-album singles
"Dovreicomprarmiunacollanacomeimigos"	2018	—		Non-album singles
"Pantone 17-3930"	2018	—		Non-album singles
"Rovesciata"	2019	—		Okay okay!!
"Long Neck" (with Taxi B and Greg Willen)	2019	—		Non-album singles
"Scolapasta"	2019	—		Non-album singles
"Facciamolo"	2019	—		Non-album singles
"ABC"	2019	—		Non-album singles
"Tik Tok" (with Radical and Greg Willen)	2019	—		Non-album singles
"Fatass"	2019	—		Non-album singles
"Alieno" (with UncleBac)	2020	—		Non-album singles
"Polka" (with Thelonious B.)	2020	—	FIMI: Platinum	Forever
"Lobby Way"	2020	87		Forever
"Boheme"	2020	—		Forever
"Britney" (with MamboLosco and Radical)	2021	52		Forever and Ever
"Polka 3" (with Bdope)	2022	—		Non-album singles
"Non è normale"	2022	—		Non-album singles
"Made in Italy" (with Bdope)	2023	6	FIMI: 2x Platinum	Non-album singles
"Bellu guaglione"	2023	—		Non-album singles
"Blackout"	2024	—		Non-album singles
"3some" (featuring VillaBanks)	2024	—		Non-album singles
"Mammamì"	2026	—		Non-album singles
"—" denotes singles that did not chart or were not released.

=== As featured artist ===
List of singles as featured artist
Title	Year	Peak chart positions	Certifications	Album
Title	Year	ITA	Certifications	Album
"Wicked" (Cristolodato featuring Rosa Chemical)	2018	—		Non-album singles
"Bitch" (Joe Scacchi featuring Rosa Chemical)	2020	—		Non-album singles
"Snob" (Alfa featuring Rosa Chemical)	2021	—		Nord
"Gangsta Love" (Rose Villain featuring Rosa Chemical)	2021	—		Non-album single
"Marmellata" (Wayne Santana featuring Rosa Chemical, Tony Effe, and Radical)	2021	—		Succo di zenzero vol. 2
"Benedetto l'inferno" (Canova featuring Rosa Chemical and Gianna Nannini)	2022	—		Level One
"Comincia tu" (Tananai featuring Rosa Chemical)	2022	—	FIMI: Gold	Non-album single
"Opera" (Diss Gacha featuring Rosa Chemical)	2024	74		Cultura italiana pt.1
"Yummy yummy" (Sillyelly featuring Yung Snapp and Rosa Chemical)	2025	—		Non-album single

== Other charted/certified songs ==
Title	Year	Peak chart positions	Certifications	Album
Title	Year	ITA	Certifications	Album
"Londra" (featuring Rkomi)	2020	58	FIMI: Gold	Forever
"Polka 2" (featuring Guè and Ernia)	2021	16	FIMI: Gold	Forever and Ever

== Guest appearances ==
Title	Year	Peak chart positions	Certifications	Album
Title	Year	ITA	Certifications	Album
"4L" (FSK Satellite featuring Rosa Chemical)	2019	—		FSK Trapshit
"Ciò che mi piace" (Rattoboys featuring Rosa Chemical)	2019	—		R4ttoboys Members Only Vol. 1
"3K" (Radical featuring Rosa Chemical)	2020	—		Trashbin, Vol. 3
"#thotmilanodm" (Radical featuring Thelonious B. and Rosa Chemical)	2020	—		Trashbin, Vol. 3
"Lindo" (Boro and MamboLosco featuring Rosa Chemical)	2020	—		Caldo
"Succo di bimbi" (VillaBanks featuring Rosa Chemical)	2020	—		El puto mundo
"Baby" (Slait, Thasup and Young Miles featuring Rosa Chemical)	2020	14	FIMI: Gold	BV3
"Hallelujah" (Axos feauring Rosa Chemical)	2020	—		Anima mundi
"Sogni lucidi" (Mace feauring Carl Brave and Rosa Chemical)	2021	33		OBE
"OK Boomer" (Nitro feauring Rosa Chemical)	2021	—		GarbAge Evilution
"Discoteka" (Fred De Palma feauring Rosa Chemical)	2021	—		Unico
"Dualipa e Dababy" (Radical feauring Rosa Chemical)	2022	—		Evol
"Carne" (Macello featuring Rosa Chemical, 18K and Pitta)	2026	—		Pensieri cattivi
"Goofies" (Leam feauring Rosa Chemical)	2026	—		Damn!

== Produced by Rosa Chemical ==
Title	Year	Artist(s)	Album
"Olocausto su Soundcloud "	2019	Ricky Squah	Non-album singles
"Try to Catch Me"	2020	Zyrtck	Non-album singles
"2 di tutto"	2025	Zep Dembo	753 d.C.pz
