= Paprika (disambiguation) =

Paprika is a ground spice made from dried red pepper.

Paprika may also refer to:

== Arts and entertainment ==
=== Literature and animation ===
- Paprika (novel), a 1993 Japanese novel by Yasutaka Tsutsui
- Paprika, a 2018 animated TV series by Xilam

=== Film ===
- Paprika (1932 film), a German comedy directed by Carl Boese
- Paprika (1933 French film), a French comedy directed by Jean de Limur
- Paprika (1933 Italian film), an Italian comedy directed by Carl Boese
- Paprika (1959 film), a West German comedy film directed by Kurt Wilhelm
- Paprika (1991 film), an Italian erotic drama film directed by Tinto Brass
- Paprika (2006 film), a Japanese anime film directed by Satoshi Kon, based on the 1993 novel

=== Other uses ===
- "Paprika" (Foorin song), 2018
- "Paprika" (Ghali song), 2024
- "Paprika", by Japanese Breakfast from Jubilee, 2021
- Paprika, a character in the children's TV series Blue's Clues
- Paprika, a character in the video game Them's Fightin' Herds

== People ==
- Paprika Steen (Kirstine Steen, born 1964), a Danish actress
- Elis Paprika (Erika Elizabeth Nogues, born 1980), a Mexican singer-songwriter
- Jenő Paprika (born 1960), a Hungarian gymnast

== Other uses ==
- TV Paprika, a Hungarian television channel
- Paprika Rádió, a Hungarian language radio station broadcasting in Romania
- Potentially all pairwise rankings of all possible alternatives (PAPRIKA), a technique for multi-criteria decision-making

== See also ==
- Bell pepper
- Chicken paprikas, or paprika chicken
