= EHY =

EHY or Ehy may refer to:

- Ehy, song by Gemitaiz featuring Chadia Rodríguez
- Ehy Lagoon, part of Aby Lagoon
- Ehy Forest, habitat of Miss Waldron's red colobus monkey species
- EHY, model code for Luxeed R7 car
