= Lontano =

Lontano, Italian for distant or away, may refer to:

- Lontano (album) or the title tracks, by Tomasz Stańko, 2005
- "Lontano" (Francesca Michielin song), 2015
- "Lontano" (Sfera Ebbasta song), 2026
- Lontano, a 1967 orchestral composition by György Ligeti
- "Lontano, lontano", a duet from the 1875 opera Mefistofele by Boito
- Lontano Ensemble, a London-based contemporary music ensemble co-founded in 1976 by Odaline de la Martinez
- Lontano, a 2015 novel by Jean-Christophe Grangé
