= Padre figlio e spirito =

Studio album by FSK Satellite
- Released: 11 September 2020
- Genres: Trap; bubblegum pop; electronic music; hardstyle
- Length: 42:16
- Labels: Thaurus, Universal Music Group
- Producers: Beak On The Night; Charlie Charles; Drillionaire; Greg Willen

FSK Satellite chronology
FSK Trapshit (2019)	Padre figlio e spirito (2020)

Singles from Padre figlio e spirito
- 1. "Settimana al caldo" Released: 24 July 2020

Padre figlio e spirito (transl. "Father, Son and the Holy Spirit") is the second and final studio album by Italian trap musical group FSK Satellite, released on 11 September 2020 through Thaurus Music and Universal.

Preceded by the single "Settimana al caldo", released on 24 July 2020, the album peaked at number one on the Italian Albums Chart, with eight ot its fifteen tracks charting on the Singles Chart, the highest being "Soldi sulla carta", featuring Sfera Ebbasta, at number 15.

A digital reissue including the track "Sudditaliano" was released on 1 July 2021, following the announcement of the group's separation. With the reissue, the album charted again at number 74.

== Background ==
Like their previous project, Padre figlio e spirito was mostly produced by Greg Willen, but also saw the participation of producers Charlie Charles, Drillionaire and Beak On The Night. Between 2020 and 2021 music videos for "Sudditaliano", "Settimana al caldo" and "10 X in California" were released on the group's YouTube channel, with the latter featuring a guest appareance by Italian media personality Andrea Diprè.

== Track listing ==
"Padre figlio e spirito" track listing
No.	Title	Lyrics	Producer(s)	Length
1.	"Padre figlio e spirito"	Michele Ballabene; Romano Maiorella	Greg Willen	3:04
2.	"Don't Touch My Stick"	Ballabene; Maiorella; Rocco Modello	Greg Willen; Beak On The Night	2:28
3.	"Lean nel lean"	Maiorella; Modello	Greg Willen	3:06
4.	"Husky"	Ballabene; Maiorella; Modello	Drillionaire	3:23
5.	"Asso di bastoni"	Ballabene; Modello	Greg Willen	2:39
6.	"Soldi sulla carta" (featuring Sfera Ebbasta)	Ballabene; Maiorella; Modello; Gionata Boschetti	Charlie Charles; Greg Willen	2:53
7.	"Settimana al caldo"	Ballabene; Maiorella; Modello	Greg Willen	2:46
8.	"Top Gun"	Ballabene; Maiorella; Modello	Drillionaire	3:02
9.	"Ho fatto" (featuring Chief Keef and Tadoe)	Ballabene; Maiorella; Modello; Keith Cozart; Darron Rose	Greg Willen	3:45
10.	"Due e zero"	Ballabene; Modello	Greg Willen	3:14
11.	"Mastercard"	Ballabene; Maiorella	Greg Willen	1:57
12.	"Money Fast"	Maiorella; Modello	Greg Willen	2:44
13.	"Tre terroni a Milano"	Ballabene; Modello	Greg Willen	2:28
14.	"Easy Boys"	Ballabene; Modello	Greg Willen	2:25
15.	"10 X in California"	Ballabene; Maiorella; Modello	Greg Willen	2:22
Total length:				42:16

Reissue bonus track
No.	Title	Lyrics	Producer	Length
1.	"Sudditaliano"	Ballabene, Maiorella, Modello	Greg Willen	3:13

=== Notes ===
- All tracks are stylized in all caps

== Charts ==
=== Weekly charts ===
Chart (2020)	Peak position
Italian Albums (FIMI)	1

=== Year-end charts ===
Chart (2020)	Position
Italian Albums (FIMI)	97

== Certifications ==
Certifications for "Padre figlio e spirito"
Region	Certification	Certified units/sales
Italy (FIMI)	Gold	25,000^{‡}
^{‡} Sales+streaming figures based on certification alone.
