= Sapobully =

- Born: Romano Maiorella; 25 October 1998 (age 27); Venosa, Basilicata, Italy
- Occupations: Singer; rapper
- Years active: 2017–present
- Labels: Thaurus, Universal

Romano Maiorella (born 25 October 1998), known professionally as Sapobully, is an Italian singer and rapper, former member of FSK Satellite.

== Career ==
Sapobully started his musical career in 2017 as a member of the hip-hop collective FSK Satellite, along with Chiello and Taxi B. With FSK Satellite, he released two successful albums: FSK Trapshit (2019) and Padre figlio e spirito (2020). In June 2021, the group disbanded to pursue solo careers.

As a solo artist, Sapobully had already begun to emerge in 2020, with the song "Mitra" produced by Greg Willen, which peaked at number 35 on the Italian Singles Chart. In September 2022, he released the single "Too Famous". On 24 October 2024, his first solo album Smetto quando voglio was released, featuring 16 tracks, including the singles "Too Famous", "Ollare", and "Pakistan", as well as collaborations with Chiello and Taxi B.

On 6 June 2025, Sapobully released the single "Baby", followed on 11 July by "Tequila", a collaboration with Bello Figo. The two tracks preceded the EP 4Ever Tape #1, issued on 24 July 2025.

== Discography ==
=== Studio albums ===
- Smetto quando voglio (2024)

=== Mixtapes ===
- Zingaro (2018, with Chiello)
- 4Ever Tape #1 (2025)
