= Pare (song) =

Single by Ghali featuring Madame

from the album Sensazione ultra
- Released: 17 June 2022
- Recorded: 2022
- Length: 2:45
- Label: Atlantic; Warner; Sto
- Composers: Eugenio Maimone; Federico Mercuri; Giordano Cremona; Leonardo Grillotti
- Lyricists: Ghali Amdouni; Francesca Calearo; Jacopo Ettorre
- Producer: Itaca

Ghali singles chronology
"Fortuna" (2022)	"Pare" (2022)	"Puta" (2023)

Madame singles chronology
"L'eccezione" (2021)	"Pare" (2022)	"Caos" (2022)

"Pare" is a song by Italian rapper Ghali, with featured vocals by Madame. It was released on 17 June 2022 as the fourth single from Ghali's third studio album Sensazione ultra.

The song also includes an uncredited vocal cameo by rapper Massimo Pericolo.

== Personnel ==
Credits adapted from Tidal.

- Ghali – lyricist and vocals
- Madame – featured artist, lyricist, vocals
- Itaca – producer, programming and recording engineer
- Eugenio Maimone – composer
- Federico Mercuri – composer
- Giordano Cremona – composer
- Leonardo Grillotti – composer
- Jacopo Ettorre – lyricist
- Mikaelin "Blue" BlueSpruce – mixing engineer

== Music video ==
The music video for "Pare", directed by Davide Vicari, was released on 27 June 2022 via Ghali's YouTube channel.

== Charts ==
=== Weekly charts ===
Weekly chart performance for "Pare"
Chart (2022)	Peak position
Italy (FIMI)	29

=== Year-end charts ===
Year-end chart performance for "Pare"
Chart (2022)	Position
Italy (FIMI)	74

== Certifications ==
Region	Certification	Certified units/sales
Italy (FIMI)	2× Platinum	200,000^{‡}
^{‡} Sales+streaming figures based on certification alone.
