= Bigger Than You =

2018 single by 2 Chainz featuring Drake and Quavo

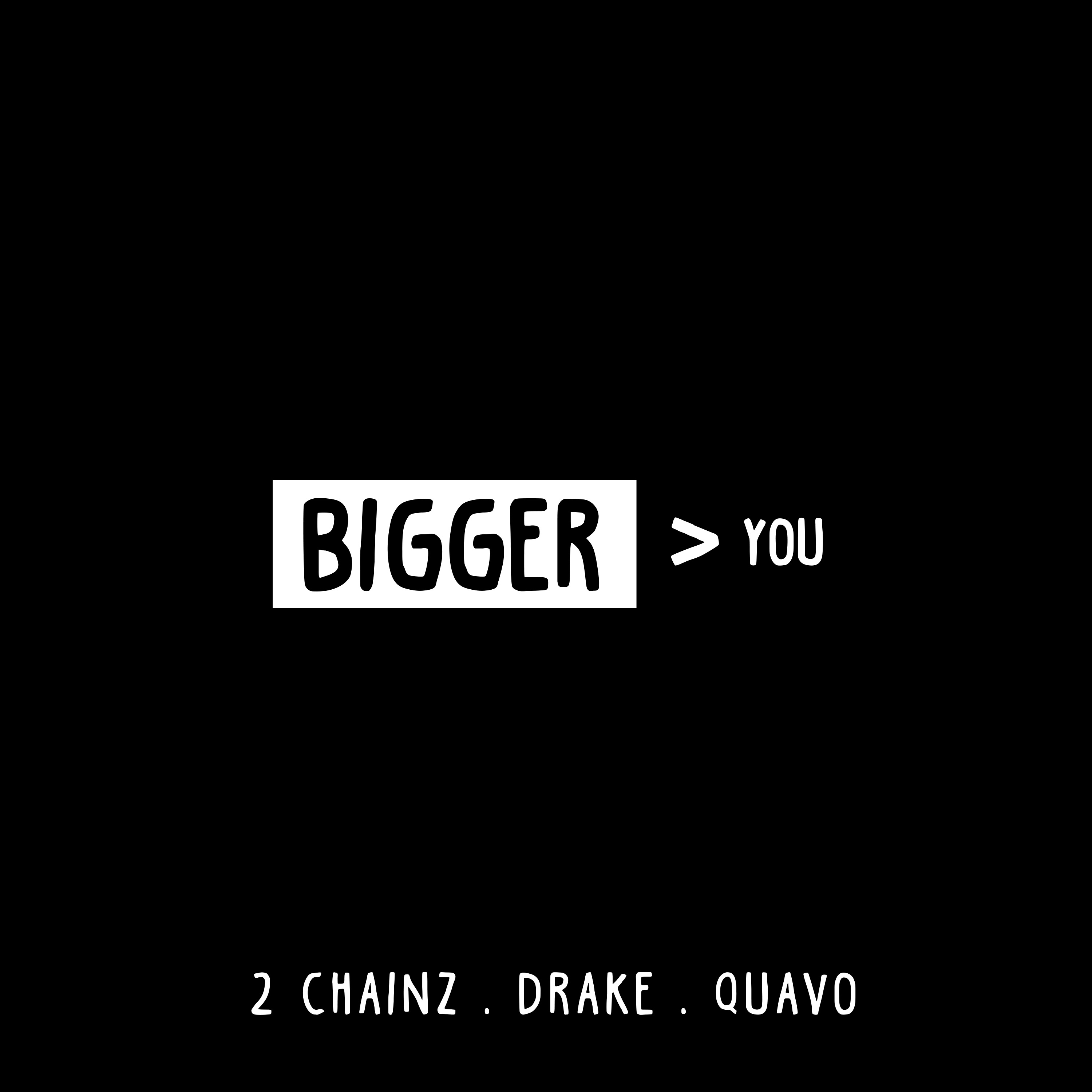

Single by 2 Chainz featuring Drake and Quavo
- Released: June 15, 2018
- Length: 3:45
- Label: Gamebread; Def Jam
- Songwriters: Tauheed Epps; Shane Lindstrom; Ramon Ibanga Jr.; Quavious Marshall; Aubrey Graham
- Producers: Illmind; Murda Beatz

2 Chainz singles chronology
"Big Bank" (2018)	"Bigger Than You" (2018)	"Soju" (2018)

Drake singles chronology
"I'm Upset" (2018)	"Bigger Than You" (2018)	"Don't Matter to Me" (2018)

Quavo singles chronology
"Cupido" (2018)	"Bigger Than You" (2018)	"Ghost Busters" (2018)

Music video
- "Bigger Than You" on YouTube

"Bigger Than You" (stylized as Bigger > You) is a song by American rapper 2 Chainz featuring Canadian rapper Drake and fellow American rapper Quavo, released on June 15, 2018. The song was written alongside producers Illmind and Murda Beatz.

== Music video ==
A music video was released on September 19, 2018 on 2 Chainz's Vevo account on YouTube. Directed by Nathan R. Smith, it features child versions of Chainz, Drake, Quavo and Murda Beatz causing chaos in a school. The quartet raps while standing atop tables and strutting around a hallway.

== Charts ==
Chart (2018)	Peak position
Canada (Canadian Hot 100)	43
US Billboard Hot 100	53
US Hot R&B/Hip-Hop Songs (Billboard)	28
US Rhythmic Airplay (Billboard)	33

== Certifications ==
Region	Certification	Certified units/sales
Australia (ARIA)	Gold	35,000^{‡}
United States (RIAA)	Platinum	1,000,000^{‡}
^{‡} Sales+streaming figures based on certification alone.
