= Chadia Rodríguez =

Rapper

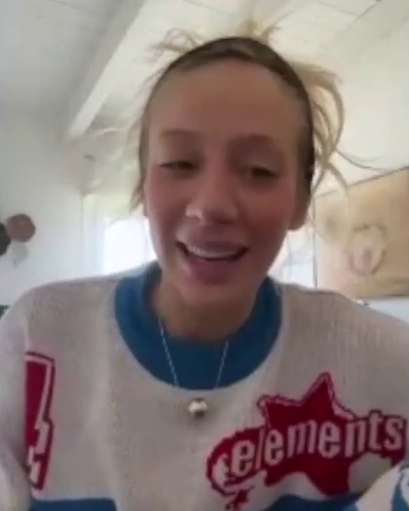
- Born: 6 November 1998 (age 27); Almeria, Spain
- Occupation: Rapper
- Years active: 2018–present

Chadia Darnakh Rodríguez, known simply as Chadia Rodríguez (born 6 November 1998), is a Moroccan Italian rapper.

== Biography ==
Rodríguez was born in Almería, Spain, to Moroccan parents. She grew up in Turin where she began playing in a Juventus women's youth team, before abandoning the sport due to a serious injury.

She moved to Milan where she worked as a nude model and then dedicated herself completely to music, starting to write her first songs. She was later noticed by the producer Big Fish who signed her to Doner Music, a record label co-founded with Jake La Furia of Club Dogo.

She was noticed by Sony Music thanks to her first song "Dale" and signed with the record company in June 2018. In the same year she became the first woman to appear on the cover of a rap playlist on the Spotify streaming service. The following singles, "Fumo Bianco" and "Bitch 2.0", made her gain popularity throughout the entire country of Italy, the former being certified gold by FIMI, the Italian Music Industry Federation, with over 25,000 copies sold nationally. Her first EP, Avere 20 anni, was released on January 11, 2019, containing all of the previously released singles, along with "Sarebbe Comodo". On March 15, 2019 she headlined at the "MI AMI XXX" music festival, hosted at District 272 in Milan.

In May 2019, she performed on Manuel Agnelli's show Ossigeno while on 31 January 2020 the single "La Voce di Chadia" was released, strongly inspired by the american drama television series Narcos.

On 8 March 2020, she announced the collaboration with Federica Carta, "Bella Cosi", which was slated to be released on March 27th, 2020; however the song's release was postponed due to the Coronavirus pandemic. The song was released on May 22nd, and was later certified gold.

In June 2020, she was featured on the cover of the Italian edition of Billboard and was also the featured on an episode of the MTV program YO! MTV Raps.

On 20 October 2020, she was featured on an episode of the program Giovani e famosi on Rai 2. In 2022, she hosted the sex education program Sex, Lies & Chadia on Discovery+ and published the omonym book Sex, Lies & Chadia. Il mio libero manuale di educazione al piacere with the publishing house Baldini & Castoldi.

== Discography ==
=== EP ===
- 2019 – Avere 20 anni
- 2024 - EP 6/2 (from REAL TALK)
- 2025 - Slim Chadia

=== Singles ===
As principal artist

- 2018 – Dale
- 2018 – Fumo bianco
- 2018 – Bitch 2.0
- 2018 – Sister (pastiglie)
- 2018 – 3G (feat. Big Fish e Jake La Furia)
- 2019 – Sarebbe comodo
- 2019 – Coca Cola
- 2019 – Mangiauomini
- 2020 – La voce di Chadia
- 2020 – Bella così (feat. Federica Carta)
- 2021 – Donne che odiano le donne (feat. Erika Lei)
- 2021 – Non mi uccidere (feat. Alice Pagani)
- 2021 – Tutt* stran*
- 2022 – Preferisco te (con Cara)
- 2022 – Bitch 3.0
- 2023 – Criminale (con Smookid)
- 2023 – Figli del deserto
- 2024 – Bondage - la gola
- 2024 - "Filo spinato - la superbia"
- 2024 — “Le Regole della bitch” (con Milano mobster)
- 2024 - "Sugar daddy"
- 2025 - GRISELDA
- 2025 - Nel Prime
- 2026 - Makeup
- 2026 - No Stop

As guest artist

- 2019 – Torcida (Big Fish feat. Fabri Fibra, Jake La Furia, Emis Killa e Chadia Rodríguez)
- 2019 – Donna domani (Luna feat. Chadia Rodríguez)
- 2022 – Spyo (Xhovana feat. Chadia Rodríguez)
- 2022 – Metropoli paradiso (Astol feat. Chadia Rodríguez)

=== Collaborations ===
- 2018 – Mr Bamboo (Ernia feat. Chadia Rodriguez) in 68 (Till the End)
- 2019 – Sciacqua la bocca (The Night Skinny feat. Chadia Rodríguez) in Mattoni
- 2020 – Pericoloso (J-Ax feat. Chadia Rodríguez) in ReAle
- 2020 – Principessa (Annalisa feat. Chadia Rodríguez) in Nuda
- 2020 – Ehy (Gemitaiz feat. Priestess & Chadia Rodríguez) in QVC9
- 2021 – Ci sta (Giaime feat. Chadia Rodríguez) in Figlio maschio
- 2022 – Vetri fumé (Not Good feat. Chadia Rodríguez) in Vero liricista
