= Tran tran =

Single by Sfera Ebbasta

from the album Rockstar
- Released: 9 June 2017
- Genre: Trap
- Length: 3:40
- Label: Universal; Def Jam
- Songwriters: Gionata Boschetti; Paolo Alberto Monachetti
- Producer: Charlie Charles

Sfera Ebbasta singles chronology
"Dexter" (2017)	"Tran tran" (2017)	"Hypebae" (2017)

Music video
- "Tran tran" on YouTube

"Tran tran" is a song by Italian rapper Sfera Ebbasta. It was released on 9 June 2017 through Universal Music Group as the lead single from the artist's second solo studio album Rockstar.

A remixed version of the track featuring Lary Over was included in the international edition of the album. The song topped the FIMI singles chart and was certified quintuple platinum in Italy.

== Music video ==
The music video for "Tran tran", directed by Andrea Folino, was released on 14 June 2017 via Sfera Ebbasta's YouTube channel. It was filmed in Gonnostramatza, Sardinia.

== Charts ==
=== Weekly charts ===
Chart performance for "Tran tran"
Chart (2017)	Peak position
Italy (FIMI)	1

=== Year-end charts ===
2017 year-end chart performance for "Tran tran"
Chart	Position
Italy (FIMI)	21

2018 year-end chart performance for "Tran tran"
Chart	Position
Italy (FIMI)	61

== Certifications ==
Certification for "Tran tran"
Region	Certification	Certified units/sales
Italy (FIMI)	5× Platinum	250,000^{‡}
^{‡} Sales+streaming figures based on certification alone.
