= FSK Trapshit =

Studio album by FSK Satellite
- Released: 12 July 2019
- Genres: Trap; Hardcore hip-hop
- Length: 26:58
- Labels: Thaurus; Universal Music
- Producers: Beak On The Night; Dbackinyahead; Greg Willen; Luca La Piana

FSK Satellite chronology
FSK Trapshit (2019)	Padre figlio e spirito (2020)

FSK Trapshit is the debut studio album by Italian trap musical group FSK Satellite, released on 12 July 2019 through Thaurus and Universal Music.

An expanded reissue including seven new tracks, FSK Trapshit Revenge, was released on 6 December 2019.

Although no song was released as a single, the songs No spie, La prova del cuoco and Melissa P were certified gold in Italy, Ansia no was certified platinum.

Professional ratings
Review scores
Source	Rating
La casa del rap	6/10 stars
Ondarock	6/10 stars
Rockol	3/5 stars

== Track listing ==
FSK Trapshit track listing
No.	Title	Lyrics	Music	Producer	Length
1.	"Up"	Michele Ballabene	Gregory Taurone	Greg Willen	2:24
2.	"No spie"	Ballabene; Romano Maiorella	Taurone	Greg Willen	2:21
3.	"Catene Jesus"	Ballabene; Maiorella; Rocco Modello	Taurone	Greg Willen	3:10
4.	"4L" (featuring Rosa Chemical)	Maiorella; Manuel Franco Rocati	Taurone	Greg Willen	2:17
5.	"Ok No Play"	Modello	Taurone	Greg Willen	2:08
6.	"La prova del cuoco"	Ballabene; Maiorella; Modello	Taurone	Greg Willen	2:36
7.	"Melissa P"	Ballabene; Modello	Vincezo Di Bacco	Dbackinyahead	2:46
8.	"Non è mia"	Maiorella; Modello	Taurone	Greg Willen	2:36
9.	"Canottiera white"	Maiorella	Taurone	Greg Willen	2:02
10.	"Abbiamo"	Ballabene; Modello	Luca La Piana	Luca La Piana	1:41
11.	"Pickup" (featuring Daytona KK)	Ballabene; Maiorella; Modello; Michele Corvino	Taurone	Greg Willen	2:54
Total length:					26:58

FSK Trapshit Revenge - Reissue bonus tracks
No.	Title	Lyrics	Music	Producer	Length
1.	"Bla bla"	Ballabene; Modello	Taurone	Greg Willen	2:07
2.	"Ansia no"	Ballabene; Maiorella; Modello	Taurone	Greg Willen	2:28
3.	"Camoscio"	Ballabene; Maiorella; Modello	Antonio Christian Laudando	Beak On The Night	3:00
4.	"Capi della trap" (featuring Guè)	Ballabene; Maiorella; Modello; Cosimo Fini	Taurone	Greg Willen	2:44
5.	"Non farcelo fare"	Maiorella; Modello	Taurone	Greg Willen	2:32
6.	"Fragola eroina"	Ballabene; Maiorella; Modello	Taurone	Greg Willen	3:36
7.	"Più di un kilo"	Ballabene; Modello	Taurone	Greg Willen	2:36

== Charts ==
=== Weekly charts ===
Chart (2020)	Peak position
Italian Albums (FIMI)	5

=== Year-end charts ===
Chart (2019)	Position
Italian Albums (FIMI)	82
Chart (2020)	Position
Italian Albums (FIMI)	32

== Certifications ==
Certifications for "FSK Trapshit"
Region	Certification	Certified units/sales
Italy (FIMI)	Platinum	50,000^{‡}
^{‡} Sales+streaming figures based on certification alone.
