= Alleluia (Shiva song) =

Single by Shiva featuring Sfera Ebbasta

from the album Milano Demons
- Released: 25 November 2022
- Length: 2:45
- Label: Columbia
- Producers: Drillionaire; Daves the Kid

Shiva singles chronology
"Take 4" (2022)	"Alleluia" (2022)	"Gelosa" (2023)

Sfera Ebbasta singles chronology
"Téléphone" (2022)	"Alleluia" (2022)	"Gelosa" (2023)

Music video
- "Alleluia" on YouTube

"Alleluia" is a song by Italian rapper Shiva featuring Sfera Ebbasta. It was produced by Drillionaire and Daves the Kid, and released on 25 November 2022 by Columbia Records as the fifth single from Shiva's fourth album Milano Demons.

The song topped the Italian singles chart and was certified double platinum in Italy.

== Music video ==
The music video for "Alleluia", directed by Late Milk, was released on the same day via Shiva's YouTube channel.

== Charts ==
=== Weekly charts ===
Chart performance for "Alleluia"
Chart (2022)	Peak position
Italy (FIMI)	1

=== Year-end charts ===
2023 year-end chart performance for "Alleluia"
Chart	Position
Italy (FIMI)	82

== Certifications ==
Region	Certification	Certified units/sales
Italy (FIMI)	2× Platinum	200,000^{‡}
^{‡} Sales+streaming figures based on certification alone.
