= Andrea Diprè =

Italian media personality and lawyer

- Born: Andrea Diprè; 9 November 1974 (age 51); Tione di Trento, Italy
- Occupations: Lawyer; art critic
- Spouse: Riley Steele (m. 2015; div. 2018)

Andrea Diprè (born 9 November 1974) is an Italian media personality, lawyer, and art critic. After becoming a lawyer, owing to his strict Catholic education, Diprè initially Having failed to be elected, he rejected his past Catholic ways and began his art critic career, becoming well known in the 2000s and 2010s for his outbursts and his over-the-top personal life, including drugs and sex, known as Dipreism. In the 2010s, Diprè also began a social media personality career, which attracted national attention.

Diprè founded his own television channel Diprè TV and YouTube channel, which included art critics, interview with trash culture personalities and porn stars (on YouTube), shock humour, and pornographic content involving Diprè himself (on Diprè TV). During these years, he began a relationship with Sara Tommasi and from 2015 to 2018 was married to porn star Riley Steele. He also pursued a musical career as an independent artist.

== Early life and education ==
Diprè was born in Stenico on 9 November 1974. He allegedly earned a law degree from the University of Trento, and practiced as a lawyer until he was radiated from the Lawyers' Order. He has a brother and a sister, Luca and Marta, and received a strict Catholic education, which pushed him to attempt an ecclesiastical-political career.

== Career ==
Diprè started career as the president of the Provincial Pastoral Council of Trento and gained recognition through his column "Vita in Diocesi", which was featured on the regional television network Telepace. In particular, his sermons, outbursts against homosexuals, and vocal criticism of society gained prominence when excerpts from his column were included on the TV show Blob. After becoming a lay bishop, Diprè had a brief political career with La Margherita and Lega Nord. In the 1998 Trentino-Alto Adige regional election, he ran on the Margherita list led by Francesco Rutelli but was not elected. Subsequently, he ran for mayor of Stenico but was unsuccessful. He later repudiated the old politics and parties, and begun to harbor hatred towards the Catholic Church, in his view guilty of having betrayed him during his election campaigns. He was disowned by his followers for having hosted a program in the company of a naked woman, and joined Lega Nord to be able to enter Tele Padania, where he started to host the program Giovani Padani.

Starting in the early 2000s, Diprè dedicated himself to art. Among others television channels, he founded his own television channel Dipré TV on the Italian satellite television platform Sky Italia, where he hosted his own program in which he presented and promoted small independent artists and their artworks. He hosted various shows, such as Le scelte di Andrea Diprè (2001–2012), showcasing lesser-known painters. He appeared in several Italian television programs as a guest, such as Gene Gnocchi's La Grande Notte del Lunedì, Artù, and The Maurizio Costanzo Show. It was during the 2010s that Diprè achieved notoriety due to the local televisions broadcasting his shows where he would host unknown or would-be painters. Also in the 2010s, Diprè started a YouTube channel, and later became the owner of various YouTube channels, almost all with his name even if originally there were numbers or other names to differentiate them from each other, as they got suspended. His interview with the painter Osvaldo Paniccia went viral.

Diprè's trash culture interviews and shock comedy were an immediate success, making him known to the general public and leading him to be interviewed by other YouTubers, including Fancazzisti ANOnimi. Another viral video was that with Giuseppe Simone. A woman, who was annoyed by Simone, gave Diprè's phone number to Simone passing it off as hers in order to get him away, and Diprè decided to start touring the peninsula interviewing various freaks. The interview with Simone exceeded two million views, and was the beginning of a series of other similar videos featuring Internet phenomena, mentally ill people, porn stars, erotic models, prostitutes, and junk television characters. In 2012, he was accused of having perpetrated scams to the detriment of his painter clients, and as a result was removed from the Italian Order of Journalists. Diprè also pursued a musical career as an independent artist, releasing his singles on streaming platforms and social media. He collaborated with the Italian rapper Bello FiGo, who dedicated him his song "Andrea Diprè" and featured him in his parody of O.T. Genasis' song "CoCo". He appeared as a guest star in the music video of "Pettinero" by Il Pagante.

== Dipreism, legal issues, and controversies ==
In addition to the notoriety and success achieved on YouTube, Diprè earned the "King of Trash" moniker, and also attracted much controversy, contempt, and criticism, including from Selvaggia Lucarelli, in particular with regards to his interview with Sara Tommasi, with whom he began what has been described as a toxic relationship. With the arrival of Rosario Muniz, Diprè and his content have been described as trying "in every way to shock the spectators with increasingly disturbing characters at the limit of human decency". Subsequently, Diprè also launched pro-drug statements and pornographic films that he himself produced, including with Tommasi, especially after meeting Max Felicitas, with whom he continued to produce porn. When he was banned by the Italian Order of Journalists, Diprè stated: "Drugs are better than being registered [there]." Art critic and politician Vittorio Sgarbi accused Diprè of inciting cocaine use, while journalist Benedetta Parodi sued him for defamation, but he was acquitted.

With a wordplay between "lawyer" (avvocato in Italian) and "high" (fatto in Italian), Diprè is known as the "Avvofatto". Diprè credits himself with the foundation of Dipreism, a sort of religious movement based on three immovable pillars: the most immediate and perverse sex, hard drugs (especially cocaine), and cash. Dipreism became a viral Internet meme. Diprè himself discussed and admitted his drug addiction. In addition to the criticism from the YouTube Italian community due to his perceived lack of sense of modesty, Diprè received many complaints, including for soliciting minors, with the first of these being brought by his ex-girlfriend, the YouTuber LaDivaDelTubo. Due to the legal cases brought forward by LaDivaDelTubo that have since been dismissed, Dipré was forced to close his social channels.

On 29 November 2015, Diprè had filmed himself engaging in sexual activities with Luna Ramondini and Rebecca Volpetti, in their porn debut; it was filmed in the Robinson di Cordenons park, in the province of Pordenone, and as a result were later sentenced by the Court of Pordenone to pay €13,500, or €4,500 each, with two months of imprisonment suspended. On 2 July 2021, Diprè was arrested in Germany; this was as a result of a warning pending from the local authorities for some precedents that would have led to the arrest. After 38 days in jails, he was released, and returned to Prague, where he lives.

== Personal life ==
Diprè had a romantic relationship with the Italian actress Sara Tommasi. In 2015, the couple announced their upcoming wedding, which Diprè compared to that of Lucia in The Betrothed; scheduled to be held in Las Vegas, this never took place. Their relationship was the subject of much controversy, resulting in a media scandal. Italian rappers J-Ax and Fedez referred to the scandal in their track "Pieno di stronzi", mentioning Diprè and Tommasi in the lyrics of the song. Later in 2015, he married the pornographic actress Riley Steele in Van Nuys, Los Angeles. In 2018, the couple divorced.

In May 2024, Diprè, who has had a history of drug use and abuse, was reportedly hospitalized in serious condition due to a drug overdose, as communicated by his associated social page Videotecadipreista; the first updates came from Il Dolomiti, an independent newspaper of Trentino-Alto Adige, which claimed to have been able to get in touch with the hospital where Diprè was hospitalized and stated that he was not in the intensive care unit. His hospitalization proved to be a hoax and fake news, and days later Diprè himself published a video on Instagram in which he used cocaine. As reported by Il Dolomiti, he also re-appeared in a shopping centre in Trento South to take selfies with passers-by.
