= Taxi B =

- Born: Michele Ballabene; 30 May 1998 (age 28); Melfi, Basilicata, Italy
- Origin: Rapolla, Basilicata, Italy
- Occupations: Singer; rapper
- Years active: 2017–present
- Labels: Thaurus, Universal

Michele Ballabene (born 30 May 1998), known professionally as Taxi B, is an Italian singer and rapper, former member of FSK Satellite.

== Career ==
Ballabene started his musical career in 2017 as a member of the hip-hop collective FSK Satellite, along with Chiello and Sapobully. With FSK Satellite, he released two successful albums: FSK Trapshit (2019) and Padre figlio e spirito (2020). In June 2021, the group disbanded to pursue solo careers.

As a solo artist, Taxi B had already begun to emerge in 2020, with the song "10 sprite" produced by Greg Willen, which peaked at number 32 on the Italian Singles Chart. In May 2022, he released the single "Samba". On 26 October 2023, his first solo album Zolfo was released, featuring 17 tracks, including collaborations with Sapobully and Rooler. In July 2024, he collaborated with Fedez and Raizhell for the single "Rosalía".

On 17 January 2025, he released the single "Birkin", featuring Baby Kirua, Sapobully, and Almighty Brian.

== Discography ==
=== Studio albums ===
Title	Details
Zolfo	Released: 28 October 2023; Label: Island, Universal

=== Singles ===
Title	Year	Peak chart positions	Album
Title	Year	ITA	Album
"Long Neck" (with Rosa Chemical and Greg Willen)	2019	—	Non-album singles
"Giga" (with Rasty Kilo, Night Skinny and Sapobully)	2019	—	Non-album singles
"10 sprite"	2020	32	Non-album singles
"Mobster" (with Ion, Sayanbull and Sapobully)	2020	—	Non-album singles
"Samba"	2022	—	Zolfo
"Pyppare"	2022	—	Zolfo
"SOS"	2022	—	Non-album singles
"Hype"	2023	—	Non-album singles
"Sex Pistols"	2023	—	Zolfo
"Rosalía" (with Fedez and Raizhell)	2024	—	Non-album single
"Gas" (with Kid Lost and G-Lex)	2024	—	Criatur
"Il suo culo fa"	2024	—	Non-album singles
"Birkin" (with Sapobully, Baby Kirua and Almighty Brian)	2025	—	Non-album singles

=== As featured artist ===
Title	Year	Album
"Need For Speed" (Jack Out featuring Spender, Taxi B, Radical and Kid Brass)	2018	Non-album singles
"Sesso & Soldi" (Boss Doms featuring Taxi B)	2021	Non-album singles
"Batman" (Sapobully featuring Taxi B)	2023	Non-album singles
"Scam" (Axell featuring Taxi B and Vaporstef)	2024	Non-album singles

=== Guest appearances ===
Title	Year	Other artist(s)	Peak chart positions	Certifications	Album
Title	Year	Other artist(s)	ITA	Certifications	Album
"Polisirolo"	2018	Chiello	—		Zingaro
"I Cina"	2018	Chiello, Sapobully	—		Zingaro
"CEO"	2019	Rosa Chemical	—		Okay okay!!
"Barbiexanax"	2019	Radical, Kid Brass	—		Trashbin, Vol. 2
"Mattoni"	2019	Night Skinny, Noyz Narcos, Shiva, Guè, Speranza, Achille Lauro, Geolier, Lazza, Ernia, Side Baby	11	FIMI: Gold	Mattoni
"Sport + muscoli (RMX)"	2020	Marracash, Lazza, Luchè, Paky	3		Persona
"Milf"	2020	Ghali	30		DNA Deluxe X
"Machete Satellite"	2020	Slait, Young Miles, Salmo, Greg Willen	2	FIMI: Gold	BV3
"Le guardie"	2020	Carl Brave	—		Coraggio
"Cresima"	2021	VillaBanks	—		Filtri
"Djungle"	2021	TY1, Marracash, Paky	83		Djungle
"Damerino"	2021	Chiello	93		Oceano paradiso
"Clochard"	2022	Sick Luke, Pyrex	30		X2
"Tokyo Drift"	2022	Wayne Santana	—		Succo Di Zenzero, Vol. 2
"Proibito"	2023	Drillionaire, Fabri Fibra, Mahmood	43		10
"Sexy Baby"	2024	Sapobully	—		Smetto quando voglio
