= Paprika (Ghali song) =

Single by Ghali
- Released: 10 May 2024
- Length: 2:28
- Label: Warner; Sto
- Composers: Alessandro Merli; Fabio Clemente; Luca Faraone
- Lyricists: Ghali; Jacopo Ettorre; Rida Amhaouch
- Producer: Takagi & Ketra

Ghali singles chronology
"Kiss Kiss" (2024)	"Paprika" (2024)	"Niente panico" (2024)

Music video
- "Paprika" on YouTube

"Paprika" is a song by Italian rapper Ghali. It was produced by Takagi & Ketra, and released on 10 May 2024.

The song peaked at number 3 of the Italian singles chart and was certified platinum for sales exceeding 100,000 copies.

== Music video ==
The music video for "Paprika", directed by Lorenzo Sorbini, was released on 20 May 2024 via Ghali's YouTube channel.

== Charts ==
=== Weekly charts ===
Weekly chart performance for "Paprika"
Chart (2024)	Peak position
Italy (FIMI)	3
Italy Airplay (EarOne)	4

=== Year-end charts ===
2024 year-end chart performance for "Paprika"
Chart (2024)	Position
Italy (FIMI)	14

== Certifications ==
Region	Certification	Certified units/sales
Italy (FIMI)	2× Platinum	200,000^{‡}
^{‡} Sales+streaming figures based on certification alone.
