= M' manc =

2020 song by Shablo, Geolier and Sfera Ebbasta

Single by Shablo, Geolier and Sfera Ebbasta
- Language: Italian; Neapolitan
- Released: 12 June 2020
- Genre: Trap-pop
- Length: 3:00
- Label: Island
- Songwriters: Emanuele Palumbo; Gionata Boschetti; Pablo Miguel Lombroni Capalbo
- Producer: Shablo

Shablo singles chronology
"Three Little Birds" (2020)	"M' manc" (2020)	"25 ore" (2020)

Geolier singles chronology
"Nena" (2020)	"M' manc" (2020)	"Guapo" (2020)

Sfera Ebbasta singles chronology
"Elegante" (2020)	"M' manc" (2020)	"Dorado" (2020)

Music video
- "M' manc" on YouTube

"M' manc" (transl. "I miss you") is a song by Italian record producer Shablo with vocals by Italian rappers Geolier and Sfera Ebbasta. It was released by Island Records on 12 June 2020.

The song peaked at number 1 on the Italian singles chart and was certified six platinums in Italy.

== Music video ==
A visual music video of "M' manc", directed by Simone Mariano and Federico Merlo, was released on 23 June 2020 via Shablo's YouTube channel.

== Charts ==
=== Weekly charts ===
Weekly chart performance for "M' manc"
Chart (2020)	Peak position
Italy (FIMI)	1

=== Year-end charts ===
Year-end chart performance for "M' manc"
Chart (2020)	Position
Italy (FIMI)	6

== Certifications ==
Certifications for "M' manc"
Region	Certification	Certified units/sales
Italy (FIMI)	6× Platinum	600,000^{‡}
^{‡} Sales+streaming figures based on certification alone.
