= Pablo (Rvssian and Sfera Ebbasta song) =

Single by Rvssian and Sfera Ebbasta

from the album Rockstar (Popstar Edition)
- Released: 20 July 2018
- Genre: Latin trap
- Length: 2:45
- Label: Island
- Songwriters: Gionata Boschetti; Tarik Johnston; Kevin Thomas; Richard McClashie
- Producer: Rvssian

Rvssian singles chronology
"Hard Drive" (2018)	"Pablo" (2018)	"Ponle" (2018)

Sfera Ebbasta singles chronology
"Booster/Wave" (2018)	"Pablo" (2018)	"Happy Birthday" (2018)

Music video
- "Pablo" on YouTube

"Pablo" is a song by Jamaican record producer Rvssian and Italian rapper Sfera Ebbasta. It was released on 20 July 2018 by Island Records. The song was later included in the re-issue of Sfera Ebbasta's second solo studio album Rockstar.

The song topped the Italian singles chart and was certified double platinum.

== Track listing ==
Digital download – Standard edition
No.	Title	Length
1.	"Pablo"	2:45

Digital download – Remix edition
No.	Title	Length
1.	"Pablo Remix" (featuring Rich the Kid, Moneybagg Yo and Lil Baby)	3:15

== Music video ==
The music video for "Pablo", directed by Frame x God, was released on the same day via Rvssian's YouTube channel.

== Charts ==
=== Weekly charts ===
Chart performance for "Pablo"
Chart (2018)	Peak position
Italy (FIMI)	1
Switzerland (Schweizer Hitparade)	48

=== Year-end charts ===
2018 year-end chart performance for "Pablo"
Chart (2018)	Position
Italy (FIMI)	34

== Certifications ==
Region	Certification	Certified units/sales
Italy (FIMI)	2× Platinum	100,000^{‡}
^{‡} Sales+streaming figures based on certification alone.
