= Album (Ghali album) =

Studio album by Ghali
- Released: May 26, 2017
- Genre: Trap; pop; hip hop
- Length: 38:46
- Language: Italian
- Label: Sto
- Producer: Charlie Charles

Ghali chronology
Album (2017)	Lunga vita a Sto (2017)

Singles from Album
- 1. "Ninna nanna" Released: October 28, 2016; 2. "Pizza kebab" Released: February 3, 2017; 3. "Happy Days" Released: May 12, 2017; 4. "Habibi" Released: September 1, 2017

Professional ratings
Review scores
Source	Rating
Rockol	3.5/5 stars
Rockit	Positive

Album is the first studio album by Italian rapper Ghali, released on 26 May 2017 by Sto Records. The album is triple platinum in Italy, having sold more than 150,000 copies.

== Track listing ==
No.	Title	Length
1.	"Ninna nanna"	3:57
2.	"Ricchi dentro"	2:51
3.	"Habibi"	3:04
4.	"Lacrime"	3:47
5.	"Happy Days"	3:18
6.	"Milano"	3:30
7.	"Ora d'aria"	3:13
8.	"Pizza kebab"	2:57
9.	"Liberté"	2:47
10.	"Boulevard"	3:27
11.	"Vida"	3:31
12.	"Oggi no"	2:24

Bonus track in the 2020 re-edition
No.	Title	Length
1.	"Cara Italia"	4:04

== Charts ==
Chart (2017)	Peak position
Belgian Albums (Ultratop Wallonia)	96
Italian Albums (FIMI)	2
Swiss Albums (Schweizer Hitparade)	24

== Certifications ==
Region	Certification	Certified units/sales
Italy (FIMI)	4× Platinum	200,000^{‡}
^{‡} Sales+streaming figures based on certification alone.
