= Lunga vita a Sto =

Compilation album by Ghali
- Released: November 24, 2017
- Genre: Trap
- Length: 37:10
- Language: Italian
- Label: Sto
- Producer: Charlie Charles, Fonzie Beat, Chris Nolan

Ghali chronology
Album (2017)	Lunga vita a Sto (2017)	DNA (2020)

Lunga vita a Sto is the first compilation by Italian rapper Ghali, released on 24 November 2017 by Sto Records.

On 25 September 2020, the album was also released for the first time in CD and LP formats.

== Tracks ==
No.	Title	feat.	Length
1.	"Lunga vita a Sto"		1:29
2.	"Come Milano"		3:19
3.	"Optional"		2:30
4.	"Cazzo mene"		3:42
5.	"Mamma"		2:59
6.	"Voci"		1:43
7.	"Non lo so"	Izi	3:51
8.	"Sempre me"		3:14
9.	"Marijuana"		3:42
10.	"Vai tra"		3:16
11.	"Dende"		3:29
12.	"Wily Wily"		3:56
Total length:			37:10

== Charts ==
2018 chart performance for Lunga vita a Sto
Chart (2018)	Peak position
Italian Albums (FIMI)	97

2024 chart performance for Lunga vita a Sto
Chart (2024)	Peak position
Italian Albums (FIMI)	25

== Certifications ==
Certifications for Lunga vita a Sto
Region	Certification	Certified units/sales
Italy (FIMI)	Platinum	50,000^{‡}
^{‡} Sales+streaming figures based on certification alone.
