= Happy Days (Ghali song) =

- Official cover

Single by Ghali

from the album Album
- Released: 12 May 2017
- Length: 3:18
- Label: Sto
- Producer: Charlie Charles

Ghali singles chronology
"Pizza kebab" (2017)	"Happy Days" (2017)	"Habibi" (2017)

Music video
- "Happy Days" on YouTube

"Happy Days" is a song by Italian rapper Ghali. It was produced by Charlie Charles, and released on 12 May 2017 as the third single of Ghali's first studio album Album.

The song peaked at number 4 of the Italian singles' chart and was certified quadruple platinum.

== Music video ==
The music video for "Happy Days", directed by The Perseverance, was released on 12 May 2017 via Ghali's YouTube channel.

== Charts ==
=== Weekly charts ===
Weekly chart performance for "Happy Days"
Chart (2017)	Peak position
Italy (FIMI)	4

=== Year-end charts ===
Year-end chart performance for "Happy Days"
Chart (2017)	Position
Italy (FIMI)	18

== Certifications ==
Region	Certification	Certified units/sales
Italy (FIMI)	4× Platinum	200,000^{‡}
^{‡} Sales+streaming figures based on certification alone.
