= Habibi (Ghali song) =

- Official cover

Single by Ghali

from the album Album
- Released: 1 September 2017
- Length: 3:04
- Label: Sto
- Producer: Charlie Charles

Ghali singles chronology
| "Happy Days" (2017) | "Habibi" (2017) | "Cara Italia" (2018) |

Music video
- "Habibi" on YouTube

"Habibi" is a song by Italian rapper Ghali. It was produced by Charlie Charles, and released on 1 September 2017 as the fourth single of Ghali's first studio album Album.

The song peaked at number 7 of the Italian singles' chart and was certified quadruple platinum. "Habibi" also featured in the soundtrack of the videogame FIFA 19.

== Music video ==
The music video for "Habibi", directed by Matthew Dillon Cohen, was released on 26 July 2017 via Ghali's YouTube channel.

== Charts ==
=== Weekly charts ===
Weekly chart performance for "Habibi"
| Chart (2017) | Peak position |
|---|---|
| Italy (FIMI) | 7 |

=== Year-end charts ===
2017 year-end chart performance for "Habibi"
| Chart (2017) | Position |
|---|---|
| Italy (FIMI) | 32 |

2018 year-end chart performance for "Habibi"
| Chart (2018) | Position |
|---|---|
| Italy (FIMI) | 100 |

== Certifications ==
| Region | Certification | Certified units/sales |
|---|---|---|
| Italy (FIMI) | 4× Platinum | 200,000^{‡} |
^{‡} Sales+streaming figures based on certification alone.
