= Paprika Rádió =

Hungarian language radio station broadcasting in Romania

Paprika Rádió is a Hungarian language radio station broadcasting in Cluj-Napoca, Romania. The sound of the radio station László Király, the former male voice of Gong FM, Győr Plus Radio, and the current voice of Csaba Radio.
