= Bottiglie privè =

Single by Sfera Ebbasta

from the album Famoso
- Released: 28 October 2020
- Length: 3:09
- Label: Island
- Songwriters: Gionata Boschetti; Massimo D'Ambra; Paolo Alberto Monachetti
- Producer: Charlie Charles

Sfera Ebbasta singles chronology
"Dorado" (2020)	"Bottiglie privè" (2020)	"Baby" (2020)

Music video
- "Bottiglie privè" on YouTube

"Bottiglie privè" is a song by Italian rapper Sfera Ebbasta. It was released on 28 October 2020 by Island Records as the lead single for the artist's third studio album Famoso.

The song topped the FIMI singles chart and was certified triple platinum in Italy.

== Music video ==
The music video for "Bottiglie privè", directed by Pepsy Romanoff, was released on 3 November 2020 via Sfera Ebbasta's YouTube channel. It was filmed in Cinisello Balsamo, the artist's hometown.

== Charts ==
=== Weekly charts ===
Chart performance for "Bottiglie privè"
Chart (2020)	Peak position
Italy (FIMI)	1
Italy Airplay (EarOne)	24
Switzerland (Schweizer Hitparade)	72

=== Year-end charts ===
2020 year-end chart performance for "Bottiglie privè"
Chart	Position
Italy (FIMI)	50

== Certifications ==
Certification for "Bottiglie privè"
Region	Certification	Certified units/sales
Italy (FIMI)	3× Platinum	300,000^{‡}
^{‡} Sales+streaming figures based on certification alone.
