= Ninna nanna (Ghali song) =

- Official cover

Single by Ghali

from the album Album
- Language: Italian
- Published: 28 October 2016
- Length: 3:57
- Label: Sto
- Producer: Charlie Charles

Ghali singles chronology
"Ninna nanna" (2016)	"Pizza kebab" (2017)

Music video
- "Ninna nanna" on YouTube

"Ninna nanna" (lit. 'Lullaby') is the debut single by Italian rapper Ghali, released on 28 October 2016 as the first extract from his first studio album Album. The song peaked at number 1 of the Italian singles' chart and was certified quadruple platinum in Italy, having sold over 200,000 copies.

== Description ==
Produced by Charlie Charles, the track was originally released on 14 October 2016 on the music streaming platform Spotify, achieving gold disc certification just fourteen days after its release. The cover is the work of Giuseppe Palmisano (aka Iosonopipo), who created the artwork based on Ghali's idea of being portrayed with his mother.

The rapper himself commented on the song with these words: "It took a while, that's how I am, I'm a perfectionist when it comes to my music, but I can assure you that "Ninna nanna" is the best single I've written to date".

== Tracks ==
No.	Title	Length
1.	"Ninna nanna"	3:57
Total length:		3:57

== Music video ==
The music video for "Ninna nanna", directed by Martina Pastori, was released on 31 October 2016 via Ghali's YouTube channel.

== Charts ==
=== Weekly charts ===
Weekly chart performance for "Ninna nanna"
Chart (2016)	Peak position
Italy (FIMI)	1

=== Year-end charts ===
2016 year-end chart performance for "Ninna nanna"
Chart (2016)	Position
Italy (FIMI)	77

2017 year-end chart performance for "Ninna nanna"
Chart (2017)	Position
Italy (FIMI)	42

== Certifications ==
Region	Certification	Certified units/sales
Italy (FIMI)	4× Platinum	200,000^{‡}
^{‡} Sales+streaming figures based on certification alone.
