= Rockstar (Sfera Ebbasta album) =

Studio album by Sfera Ebbasta
- Released: 19 January 2018
- Genres: Trap; pop
- Length: 34:41
- Labels: Universal Music Italy; Def Jam
- Producers: Sfera Ebbasta; Charlie Charles; Davide Covino; Rvssian

Sfera Ebbasta chronology
Sfera Ebbasta (2016)	Rockstar (2018)	Famoso (2020)

Singles from Rockstar
- 1. "Tran tran" Released: 9 June 2017; 2. "Rockstar" Released: 19 January 2018; 3. "Cupido" Released: 6 April 2018; 4. "Ricchi x sempre" Released: 13 July 2018; 5. "Happy Birthday" Released: 30 November 2018

Rockstar is the second solo studio album by Italian rapper Sfera Ebbasta. The album was released by Def Jam Recordings on 19 January 2018. The album peaked at number one on the Italian Albums Chart and it stayed on top of the chart for four weeks. Rockstar received 35 million streams on its first week on Spotify, and Sfera Ebbasta was the first Italian artist to ever appear on the streaming platform's Top 100 global chart. All of its 11 tracks entered on the first twelve positions of the Italian Singles Chart simultaneously. A deluxe edition (titled Popstar Edition) was released on 30 November 2018.

== Track listing ==
All tracks are written by Gionata Boschetti and Paolo Alberto Monachetti, except where noted. All songs produced by Charlie Charles and Sfera Ebbasta, except where noted.

Rockstar – Standard edition
No.	Title	Length
1.	"Rockstar"	3:15
2.	"Serpenti a sonagli"	3:14
3.	"Cupido" (featuring Quavo; writers: Boschetti, Quavious Marshall)	3:30
4.	"XNX"	2:23
5.	"Ricchi x sempre"	3:43
6.	"Uber"	3:07
7.	"Leggenda"	3:09
8.	"Bancomat"	3:08
9.	"Sciroppo" (featuring DrefGold; writers: Boschetti, Elia Specolizzi; producers: Charlie Charles; Davide Covino)	3:25
10.	"20 collane"	2:08
11.	"Tran tran"	3:39
Total length:		34:41

Rockstar – International edition
No.	Title	Length
1.	"Rockstar"	3:15
2.	"Serpenti a sonagli"	3:14
3.	"Cupido" (featuring Quavo; writers: Boschetti, Marshall)	3:30
4.	"XNX"	2:23
5.	"Ricchi x sempre"	3:43
6.	"Uber" (featuring Miami Yacine; writers: Boschetti, Yassine Baybah)	3:10
7.	"Leggenda"	3:09
8.	"Bancomat" (featuring Tinie Tempah; writers: Boschetti, Patrick Okogwu)	2:58
9.	"Sciroppo" (featuring DrefGold; writers: Boschetti, Elia Specolizzi; producers: Charlie Charles; Davide Covino)	3:25
10.	"20 collane" (featuring Rich the Kid; writers: Boschetti, Dimitri Roger)	2:40
11.	"Tran tran" (featuring Lary Over; writers: Boschetti, Raymond Guevara)	4:12
Total length:		35:06

Popstar Edition
No.	Title	Length
1.	"Popstar"	3:03
2.	"Uh Ah Hey"	2:56
3.	"Happy Birthday"	2:50
4.	"Cupido RMX" (Sfera Ebbasta, Khea & Duki featuring Gué Pequeno & Elettra Lamborghini; writers: Boschetti, Cosimo Fini, Lamborghini, Mauro Lombardo, Ivo Serue)	3:31
5.	"XNX RMX" (featuring Gué Pequeno; writers: Boschetti, Fini)	2:31
6.	"Serpenti a sonagli RMX" (featuring Lacrim; writers: Boschetti, Karim Zenoud)	3:14
7.	"Pablo" (Rvssian & Sfera Ebbasta; writers: Boschetti, Tarik Johnston; producer: Rvssian)	2:46

== Chart performance ==
=== Weekly charts ===
Chart (2018)	Peak position
Belgian Albums (Ultratop Wallonia)	38
French Albums (SNEP)	133
Italian Albums (FIMI)	1
Swiss Albums (Schweizer Hitparade)	2

=== Year-end charts ===
Chart (2018)	Position
Italian Albums (FIMI)	1
Chart (2019)	Position
Italian Albums (FIMI)	19
Chart (2020)	Position
Italian Albums (FIMI)	57
Chart (2021)	Position
Italian Albums (FIMI)	66
Chart (2022)	Position
Italian Albums (FIMI)	53
Chart (2023)	Position
Italian Albums (FIMI)	31
Chart (2024)	Position
Italian Albums (FIMI)	40

== Certifications ==
Region	Certification	Certified units/sales
Italy (FIMI)	9× Platinum	450,000^{‡}
^{‡} Sales+streaming figures based on certification alone.
