= Baby (Sfera Ebbasta song) =

Single by Sfera Ebbasta featuring J Balvin

from the album Famoso
- Released: 20 November 2020
- Genre: Reggaeton
- Length: 3:13
- Label: Island
- Songwriters: Gionata Boschetti; José Álvaro Osorio Balvín; Paolo Alberto Monachetti; Alejandro Ramírez Suárez
- Producer: Sky Rompiendo

Sfera Ebbasta singles chronology
"Bottiglie privè" (2020)	"Baby" (2020)	"Mambo" (2021)

J Balvin singles chronology
"De Cora" (2020)	"Baby" (2020)	"Lento" (2020)

Music video
- "Baby" on YouTube

"Baby" is a song by Italian rapper Sfera Ebbasta featuring Colombian singer J Balvin. It was released on 20 November 2020 by Island Records as the second single for Sfera Ebbasta's third studio album Famoso.

The song topped the FIMI singles chart and was certified triple platinum in Italy.

== Music video ==
The music video for "Baby", directed by Mattia Benetti, was released on 24 November 2020 via J Balvin's YouTube channel.

== Charts ==
=== Weekly charts ===
Chart performance for "Baby"
Chart (2020)	Peak position
Italy (FIMI)	1
Italy Airplay (EarOne)	14
Spain (Promusicae)	99
Switzerland (Schweizer Hitparade)	22

=== Year-end charts ===
2020 year-end chart performance for "Baby"
Chart	Position
Italy (FIMI)	91

2021 year-end chart performance for "Baby"
Chart	Position
Italy (FIMI)	57

== Certifications ==
Certification for "Baby"
Region	Certification	Certified units/sales
Italy (FIMI)	3× Platinum	210,000^{‡}
^{‡} Sales+streaming figures based on certification alone.
