= Pizza kebab =

- Official cover

Single by Ghali

from the album Album
- Released: 3 February 2017
- Length: 2:56
- Label: Sto
- Producer: Charlie Charles

Ghali singles chronology
"Ninna nanna" (2016)	"Pizza kebab" (2017)	"Happy Days" (2017)

"Pizza kebab" is a song by Italian rapper Ghali. It was produced by Charlie Charles, and released on 3 February 2017 as the second single of Ghali's first studio album Album.

The song peaked at number 3 of the Italian singles' chart and was certified double platinum.

== Charts ==
=== Weekly charts ===
Weekly chart performance for "Pizza kebab"
Chart (2017)	Peak position
Italy (FIMI)	3

=== Year-end charts ===
Year-end chart performance for "Pizza kebab"
Chart (2017)	Position
Italy (FIMI)	53

== Certifications ==
Region	Certification	Certified units/sales
Italy (FIMI)	2× Platinum	100,000^{‡}
^{‡} Sales+streaming figures based on certification alone.
