= Sensazione ultra =

Studio album by Ghali
- Released: 20 May 2022
- Genre: Pop rap
- Length: 32:29
- Language: Italian
- Label: Sto; Warner; Atlantic
- Producer: Itaca

Ghali chronology
DNA (2020)	Sensazione ultra (2022)	Pizza kebab Vol. 1 (2023)

Singles from Sensazione ultra
- 1. "Wallah" Released: 29 October 2021; 2. "Walo" Released: 8 April 2022; 3. "Fortuna" Released: 15 April 2022; 4. "Pare" Released: 17 June 2022

Sensazione ultra is the third studio album by Italian rapper Ghali, released on 20 May 2022 by Sto Records, Warner Music and Atlantic Records.

The album peaked at number 2 on the Italian albums chart and was certified platinum for sales exceeding 50,000 copies.

== Tracks ==
No.	Title	Length
1.	"Bayna"	2:05
2.	"Bravo"	2:34
3.	"Fortuna"	2:45
4.	"Free Solo" (featuring Marracash)	2:33
5.	"Walo"	2:51
6.	"Moon Rage" (featuring Axel)	3:18
7.	"Pare" (featuring Madame)	2:45
8.	"Crazy"	2:56
9.	"Peter Parker" (featuring Digital Astro)	2:31
10.	"Wallah"	2:13
11.	"Drari" (featuring Baby Gang)	2:20
12.	"Sensazione ultra"	3:28

== Charts ==
=== Weekly charts ===
Weekly chart performance for Sensazione ultra
Chart (2022)	Peak position
Italian Albums (FIMI)	2
Swiss Albums (Schweizer Hitparade)	67

=== Year-end charts ===
2022 year-end chart performance for Sensazione ultra
Chart (2022)	Position
Italian Albums (FIMI)	43

== Certifications ==
Region	Certification	Certified units/sales
Italy (FIMI)	Platinum	50,000^{‡}
^{‡} Sales+streaming figures based on certification alone.
