= Cara (singer) =

Italian singer-songwriter (born 1999)

- Born: Anna Cacopardo; 1999 (age 25–26); Milan, Lombardy, Italy
- Origin: Crema, Lombardy, Italy
- Occupations: Singer; songwriter
- Years active: 2019–present

Anna Cacopardo (born 1999), known professionally by the mononym Cara, is an Italian singer-songwriter.

== Life and career ==
Cacopardo approached music from a young age, attending the modern singing and piano class at the "Folcioni" Institute in Crema. In 2017, she participated in Mogol's Tour Music Fest, reaching the semifinals in Rome. That same year, she made it to the finals of the Area Sanremo Tour competition.

She made her debut as a singer-songwriter under the name Cara in 2019 with the song "Mi serve", her first single with Polydor Records, and "Mi serve RMX", which featured Samuel Heron and was awarded the Lunezia "Iren" Prize for its musical and literary value.

In March 2020, Cara released the single "Le feste di Pablo", written in collaboration with Dargen D'Amico, Davide Simonetta, Paolo Antonacci, and Sixpm. A few weeks later, the track was re-released with the collaboration of Fedez. This new version peaked at number one on the FIMI singles chart, achieving gold certification within a few weeks, with over 13 million streams on Spotify and more than 7 million views on YouTube. In September of the same year, the song received a platinum certification. All these early singles were included in her debut EP 99, released on 5 November 2020 by Polydor and Universal.

On 28 April 2021, she released the single "Il primo bacio", and in June, the summer single "Que tal" in collaboration with Boro Boro. In November 2021, she featured on the track "Fuori dai guai" on Fedez's album Disumano. The song peaked at number 67 on the FIMI chart.

In March 2022, Cara released the single "Preferisco te", in collaboration with Chadia Rodríguez, which topped the cover of Spotify's "Graffiti Pop" playlist and reached number one in Apple Music's "Swipe Pop".

== Discography ==
=== EPs ===
Title	EP details
99	Release date: 5 November 2020; Label: Polydor, Universal

=== Singles ===
As lead artist

Title	Year	Peak chart positions	Certifications	Album/EP
Title	Year	ITA	Certifications	Album/EP
"Mi serve" (solo or with Samuel Heron)	2019	—		99
"Le feste di Pablo" (solo or with Fedez)	2020	1	FIMI: Platinum	99
"Lentamente"	2020	—		99
"Tevere"	2020	—		99
"Il primo bacio"	2021	—		Non-album singles
"Que tal" (with Boro Boro)	2021	—		Non-album singles
"Preferisco te" (with Chadia Rodríguez)	2022	—		Non-album singles
"Come mai	2022	—		Non-album singles
"Verso casa"	2024	—		Non-album singles
"Giulia"	2024	—		Non-album singles
"Fulmini"	2024	—		Non-album singles
"Il mio compleanno"	2025	—		Non-album singles

=== Guest appearances ===
List of songs, with chart positions and album name
Single	Year	Peak chart positions	Album
Single	Year	ITA	Album
"Fuori dai guai" (Fedez featuring Cara)	2021	67	Disumano
