= Cupido (Sfera Ebbasta song) =

Single by Sfera Ebbasta featuring Quavo

from the album Rockstar
- Released: 6 April 2018
- Genre: Trap-pop
- Length: 3:30
- Label: Universal; Def Jam
- Songwriters: Gionata Boschetti; Quavious Keyate Marshall; Paolo Alberto Monachetti
- Producer: Charlie Charles

Sfera Ebbasta singles chronology
"Rockstar" (2018)	"Cupido" (2018)	"Peace & Love" (2018)

Quavo singles chronology
"Pineapple" (2018)	"Cupido" (2018)	"Bigger Than You" (2018)

"Cupido" is a song by Italian rapper Sfera Ebbasta featuring guest vocals by American rapper Quavo, and produced by Charlie Charles. It was originally released as the third track from Sfera's second studio album Rockstar on 18 January 2018, and was later released as the third official single on 6 April of the same year. The song topped the Italian singles chart and was certified quadruple platinum.

== Charts ==
=== Weekly charts ===
Chart performance for "Cupido"
Chart (2018)	Peak position
Italy (FIMI)	1
Italy Airplay (EarOne)	41
Switzerland (Schweizer Hitparade)	48

=== Year-end charts ===
2018 year-end chart performance for "Cupido"
Chart (2018)	Position
Italy (FIMI)	3

== Certifications ==
Region	Certification	Certified units/sales
Italy (FIMI)	4× Platinum	200,000^{‡}
^{‡} Sales+streaming figures based on certification alone.
