= Zingarello =

- Official cover

Single by Ghali featuring Sick Luke
- Released: 25 May 2018
- Length: 3:07
- Label: Sto
- Songwriters: Ghali; Sick Luke
- Producer: Sick Luke

Ghali singles chronology
"Peace & Love" (2018)	"Zingarello" (2018)	"I Love You" (2019)

Music video
- "Zingarello" on YouTube

"Zingarello" is a song by Italian rapper Ghali. It was produced by Sick Luke, and released on 25 May 2018 by Sto Records.

The song peaked at number 4 of the Italian singles' chart and was certified gold.

== Music video ==
A visual music video for "Zingarello", animated by Haine Art, was released on 11 June 2018 via Ghali's YouTube channel.

== Charts ==
Weekly chart performance for "Zingarello"
Chart (2018)	Peak position
Italy (FIMI)	4

== Certifications ==
Region	Certification	Certified units/sales
Italy (FIMI)	Gold	25,000^{‡}
^{‡} Sales+streaming figures based on certification alone.
