= Lontano (Sfera Ebbasta song) =

2026 song by Sfera Ebbasta

Single by Sfera Ebbasta

from the album Purosangue
- Released: 22 September 2026
- Length: 3:49
- Label: Cupido; Universal
- Producer: Drillionaire

Sfera Ebbasta singles chronology
"Pienxa en mi" (2026)	"Lontano" (2026)	"Winner" (2026)

Music video
- "Lontano" on YouTube

"Lontano" (transl. Far Away) is a song by Italian rapper Sfera Ebbasta. It was released on 22 September 2026 as the lead single from his seventh studio album, Purosangue. Produced by Drillionaire, the song addresses the personal costs of fame.

It debuted at number one on the Italian Albums Chart.

== Music video ==
The music video, directed by Reyken, was released on the same day of the single on 22 September 2026. It features the rapper's son and was filmed in front of Leonardo da Vinci's painting The Last Supper at Santa Maria delle Grazie, Milan.

== Charts ==
Chart performance for "Lontano"
Chart (2026)	Peak position
Italy (FIMI)	1
Switzerland (Swiss Hitparade)	97
