= Le feste di Pablo =

Single by Cara and Fedez

from the EP 99
- Released: 10 April 2020
- Genre: Pop
- Length: 3:13
- Label: Polydor; Universal
- Songwriters: Anna Cacopardo; Federico Lucia; Jacopo D'Amico; Paolo Antonacci; Davide Simonetta
- Producers: Davide Simonetta; Sixpm

Cara singles chronology
"Mi serve RMX" (2019)	"Le feste di Pablo" (2020)	"Lentamente" (2020)

Fedez singles chronology
"Holding Out for You" (2019)	"Le feste di Pablo" (2020)	"Problemi con tutti (Giuda)" (2020)

Music video
- "Le feste di Pablo" on YouTube

"Le feste di Pablo" (transl. Pablo's parties) is a song by Italian singer Cara. It was written by Cara, Dargen D'Amico, Davide Simonetta, Paolo Antonacci, and produced by Simonetta and Sixpm.

The song was originally released as Cara's solo single on 13 March 2020. A new version with rapper Fedez was released on 10 April 2020, peaking at number one on the FIMI singles chart. "Le feste di Pablo" was certified platinum in Italy. It was later included in Cara's debut EP 99.

== Charts ==
=== Weekly charts ===
Weekly chart performance for "Le feste di Pablo"
Chart (2020)	Peak position
Italy (FIMI)	1
Italy Airplay (EarOne)	11

=== Year-end charts ===
Year-end chart performance for "Le feste di Pablo"
Chart (2020)	Position
Italy (FIMI)	88

== Certifications ==
Certifications for "Le feste di Pablo"
Region	Certification	Certified units/sales
Italy (FIMI)	Platinum	70,000^{‡}
^{‡} Sales+streaming figures based on certification alone.
