= I Love You (Ghali song) =

- Official cover

Single by Ghali
- Released: 15 March 2019
- Length: 2:57
- Label: Sto; Warner
- Producer: Zef

Ghali singles chronology
"Zingarello" (2018)	"I Love You" (2019)	"Turbococco" (2019)

Music video
- "I Love You" on YouTube

"I Love You" is a song by Italian rapper Ghali. It was produced by Zef, and released on 15 March 2019 by Sto Records and Warner Music.

The song peaked at number 10 on the Italian singles chart and was certified platinum.

== Music video ==
A music video for "I Love You" was released on 18 March 2019 via Ghali's YouTube channel. It was directed by Tiziano Russo and shot in Le Nuove Prison in Turin.

== Charts ==
=== Weekly charts ===
Weekly chart performance for "I Love You"
Chart (2019)	Peak position
Italy (FIMI)	10

=== Year-end charts ===
Year-end chart performance for "I Love You"
Chart (2019)	Position
Italy (FIMI)	84

== Certifications ==
Region	Certification	Certified units/sales
Italy (FIMI)	Platinum	50,000^{‡}
^{‡} Sales+streaming figures based on certification alone.
