= Happy Birthday (Sfera Ebbasta song) =

Single by Sfera Ebbasta

from the album Rockstar (Popstar Edition)
- Released: 30 November 2018
- Genre: Trap
- Length: 2:50
- Label: Universal
- Songwriters: Gionata Boschetti; Paolo Alberto Monachetti; Tarik Johnston; Kevin Thomas
- Producer: Rvssian

Sfera Ebbasta singles chronology
"Pablo" (2018)	"Happy Birthday" (2018)	"Stamm fort" (2019)

Music video
- "Happy Birthday" on YouTube

"Happy Birthday" is a song by Italian rapper Sfera Ebbasta. It was released on 30 November 2018 and included in Rockstar (Popstar Edition), the reissue of Sfera Ebbasta's second studio album Rockstar. It was produced by Jamaican producer Rvssian in collaboration with Charlie Charles.

The song topped the FIMI singles chart and was certified double platinum in Italy.

== Music video ==
The music video for "Happy Birthday", directed by JMP, was released on 24 December 2018 via Sfera Ebbasta's YouTube channel.

== Charts ==
=== Weekly charts ===
Chart performance for "Happy Birthday"
Chart (2018)	Peak position
Italy (FIMI)	1
Italy Airplay (EarOne)	63
Switzerland (Schweizer Hitparade)	54

=== Year-end charts ===
2019 year-end chart performance for "Happy Birthday"
Chart	Position
Italy (FIMI)	79

== Certifications ==
Certification for "Happy Birthday"
Region	Certification	Certified units/sales
Italy (FIMI)	2× Platinum	100,000^{‡}
^{‡} Sales+streaming figures based on certification alone.
