= Pizza kebab Vol. 1 =

Studio album by Ghali
- Released: 1 December 2023
- Genre: Pop rap
- Language: Italian
- Label: Sto; Warner; Atlantic

Ghali chronology
Sensazione ultra (2022)	Pizza kebab Vol. 1 (2023)

Pizza kebab Vol. 1 is the fourth studio album by Italian rapper Ghali, released on 1 December 2023 by Sto Records, Warner Music and Atlantic Records.

The album peaked at number 5 on the Italian albums chart.

== Tracks ==
No.	Title	Length
1.	"Sto"	1:38
2.	"Paura e delirio a Milano" (featuring Tony Effe, Dylan and Side Baby)	3:06
3.	"Machiavelli" (featuring Simba La Rue)	2:16
4.	"Sotto controllo" (featuring Luchè)	2:03
5.	"Coco"	2:43
6.	"Tanti soldi" (featuring Geolier)	3:00
7.	"Zuppa di succo di mucca"	2:19
8.	"Dimmi la verità"	2:20
9.	"Safi safi" (featuring Draganov)	2:46
10.	"RR 2:30 am (Skit)"	0:32
11.	"Celine" (featuring Digital Astro)	3:03
12.	"Senza pietà"	2:14
13.	"Buonasera" (featuring Soolking)	2:53
14.	"Peccati"	2:17

== Charts ==
Chart (2023)	Peak position
Italian Albums (FIMI)	5
Swiss Albums (Schweizer Hitparade)	66

== Certifications ==
Region	Certification	Certified units/sales
Italy (FIMI)	Gold	25,000^{‡}
^{‡} Sales+streaming figures based on certification alone.
