= DNA (Ghali album) =

Studio album by Ghali
- Released: February 21, 2020
- Genre: Pop rap
- Length: 43:17
- Language: Italian
- Label: Sto
- Producer: Mace; Venerus; Zef; Canova; Merk & Kremont; M.B; Mamakass; Sick Luke; Ava; Tha Supreme; Bijan Amir; Mr Eazi; Swan

Ghali chronology
Lunga vita a Sto (2017)	DNA (2020)	Sensazione ultra (2022)

Singles from DNA
- 1. "Flashback" Released: 11 November 2019; 2. "Boogieman" Released: 17 January 2020; 3. "Good Times" Released: 3 April 2020; 4. "Barcellona" Released: 11 September 2020

Singles from DNA Deluxe X
- 1. "Mille pare (Bad Times)" Released: 20 November 2020

DNA is the second studio album by Italian rapper Ghali, released on 21 February 2020 by Sto Records. The album peaked at number one on the Italian albums chart and was certified double platinum.

== Tracks ==
No.	Title	Length
1.	"Giù per terra"	2:13
2.	"Boogieman" (featuring Salmo)	2:39
3.	"DNA"	3:20
4.	"Good Times"	2:43
5.	"Jennifer" (featuring Soolking)	2:41
6.	"22:22"	3:00
7.	"Fast Food"	2:39
8.	"Marymango" (featuring Tha Supreme)	3:24
9.	"Flashback"	3:37
10.	"Combo" (featuring Mr Eazi)	2:56
11.	"Extasy"	2:41
12.	"Barcellona"	2:56
13.	"Cuore a destra"	3:01
14.	"Scooby"	2:10
15.	"Fallito"	3:11

DNA LP re-issue
No.	Title	Length
16.	"Cacao" (featuring Pyrex)	1:53
17.	"Milf" (featuring Taxi B)	2:16

DNA Deluxe X
No.	Title	Length
18.	"1993"	2:20
19.	"Mille pare (Bad Times)"	2:21

== Charts ==
Chart (2020)	Peak position
Italian Albums (FIMI)	1
Swiss Albums (Schweizer Hitparade)	19

== Certifications ==
Region	Certification	Certified units/sales
Italy (FIMI)	3× Platinum	150,000^{‡}
^{‡} Sales+streaming figures based on certification alone.
