= FSK Satellite =

Italian musical group

- Origin: Genoa, Liguria, Italy
- Genres: Trap; Hardcore hip-hop
- Years active: 2017–2021
- Labels: Thaurus, Universal
- Past members: Chiello; Taxi B Sapobully

FSK Satellite (stylised in all caps) was an Italian hip-hop ensemble active from 2017 to 2021.

== History ==
FSK Satellite was formed in 2017 in Genoa, and originally consisted also of rappers ThugNizü and YoungGucci and producer Powv. Later the formation settled with Chiello, Taxi B, and Sapobully, three young rappers from Basilicata. They later relocated to Milan.

Their first track, "Flexioni", was released in June 2017 on YouTube and featured vocals by Chiello (credited as Pistacchiello), Sapobully (as SapoHaze) and YoungGucci (as Sebez). In 2018, Chiello and Sapobully self-published the mixtape Zingaro, influenced by drill and emo. In July 2018 they released "FSK", their first collaboration with producer Greg Willen.

Their breakthrough came with the debut album FSK Trapshit in July 2019, which peaked at number 5 on the Italian Albums Chart and achieved platinum certification. The album was mostly produced by Greg Willen and featured collaborations with Rosa Chemical and Daytona KK. An expanded reissue including seven new tracks, FSK Trapshit Revenge, was released on 6 December 2019 and featured a collaboration with Guè.

In September 2020, their second studio album, Padre figlio e spirito, was released, featuring collaborations with Sfera Ebbasta and Chief Keef. The album topped the Album Chart and was certified gold.

In June 2021, the members announced their separation and transition to solo projects. On July 1 they released a reissue of Padre figlio e spirito, which included the track "Sudditaliano".

== Members ==
- Chiello – voice (2017–2021)
- Taxi B – voice (2017–2021)
- Sapobully – voice (2017–2021)
- ThugNizü – voice (2017–2019)
- YoungGucci – voice (2017–2019)
- Powv – producer (2017–2019)

== Discography ==
=== Studio albums ===
Title	Album details	Peak chart positions	Certifications
Title	Album details	ITA	Certifications
FSK Trapshit	Released: 12 July 2019; Label: Thaurus, Universal	5	FIMI: Platinum
Padre figlio e spirito	Released: 11 September 2020; Label: Thaurus, Universal	1	FIMI: Gold

=== Singles ===
Title	Year	Peak chart positions	Certifications	Album
Title	Year	ITA	Certifications	Album
"Flexioni"	2017	—		Non-album singles
"FSK" (with Greg Willen)	2018	—		Non-album singles
"Snitch e impicci" (with DrefGold)	2020	6	FIMI: Platinum	Elo
"Settimana al caldo"	2020	62		Padre figlio e spirito
"Ragazzi della nebbia" (with Mace and Irama)	2020	54		OBE
"—" denotes a single that did not chart or was not released.

=== As featured artists ===
Title	Year	Album
"Money Dance" (Oni One featuring FSK Satellite)	2020	Grizzly

=== Other charted or certified songs ===
Title	Year	Peak chart positions	Certifications	Album
Title	Year	ITA	Certifications	Album
"No spie"	2019	95	FIMI: Gold	FSK Trapshit
"La prova del cuoco"	2019	95	FIMI: Gold	FSK Trapshit
"Melissa P"	2019	—	FIMI: Gold	FSK Trapshit
"Ansia no"	2019	4	FIMI: Platinum	FSK Trapshit Revenge
"Camoscio"	2019	84		FSK Trapshit Revenge
"Capi della trap" (featuring Guè)	2019	55		FSK Trapshit Revenge
"Padre figlio e spirito"	2020	45		Padre figlio e spirito
"Don't Touch My Stick"	2020	43		Padre figlio e spirito
"Lean nel lean"	2020	78		Padre figlio e spirito
"Husky"	2020	64		Padre figlio e spirito
"Asso di bastoni"	2020	73		Padre figlio e spirito
"Soldi sulla carta" (featuring Sfera Ebbasta and Charlie Charles)	2020	15		Padre figlio e spirito
"Top Gun"	2020	94		Padre figlio e spirito
"Ho fatto" (featuring Chief Keef and Tadoe)	2020	51		Padre figlio e spirito
"—" denotes a single that did not chart or was not released.
