= Chiello =

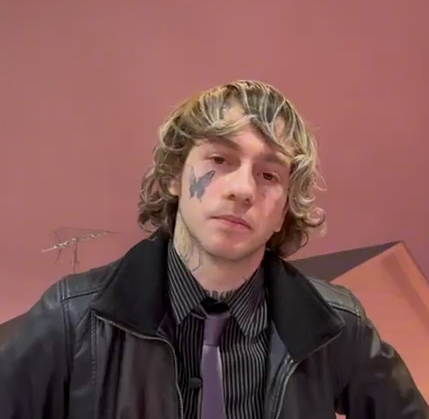
- Chiello in February 2026

Background information
- Born: Rocco Modello; 9 April 1999 (age 26); Venosa, Basilicata, Italy
- Occupations: Singer; songwriter; rapper
- Instrument: Vocals
- Years active: 2017–present
- Labels: Thaurus; Universal
- Formerly of: FSK Satellite

Rocco Modello (born 9 April 1999), known professionally as Chiello (Italian pronunciation: [ˈkjɛllo]), is an Italian singer-songwriter and rapper, former member of FSK Satellite.

== Life and career ==
Chiello founded the hip-hop collective FSK Satellite in 2017, along with Taxi B and Sapobully. They released two albums that achieved success in the Italian trap scene. In 2018, he released the mixtape Zingaro in collaboration with Sapobully. In 2019, he released a five-track EP titled Non troverai un tesoro.

Later, Chiello collaborated with various artists, including Colapesce, Madame, and Rkomi. On 14 October 2021, he released his first solo album, Oceano paradiso, which peaked at 3 on the FIMI albums chart. On 26 May 2023, he released his second album, Mela marcia.

On 14 February 2025, he participated as a guest in the cover night of the Sanremo Music Festival 2025, performing "Fiori rosa fiori di pesco" by Lucio Battisti alongside Rose Villain. On 11 April 2025, he released his third album, Scarabocchi.

On 30 November 2025, he was announced among the participants of the Sanremo Music Festival 2026. He competed with the song "Ti penso sempre", where he placed 25th.

== Discography ==
=== Studio albums ===
List of solo studio albums, with chart positions and certifications
Title	Details	Peak chart positions	Certifications
Title	Details	ITA	Certifications
Oceano paradiso	Released: 14 October 2021; Label: Thaurus, Universal Music Italia; Format: CD, LP, digital download, streaming	3	FIMI: Platinum
Mela marcia	Released: 26 May 2023; Label: Island, Universal Music Italia; Format: CD, LP, digital download, streaming	11	
Scarabocchi	Released: 11 April 2025; Label: Island, Universal Music Italia; Format: CD, LP, digital download, streaming	17	
Agonia	Released: 20 March 2026; Label: Island, Universal Music Italia; Format: CD, LP, digital download, streaming	8	

=== Mixtapes ===
Title	Album details
Zingaro (with Sapobully)	Release date: 21 September 2018; Label: Self-published; Formats: digital download, streaming

=== Extended plays ===
Title	EP details
Non troverai un tesoro (with Powv_Fsk)	Release date: 29 April 2019; Label: Self-published; Formats: Digital download, streaming
