= Cara Italia =

- Official cover

Single by Ghali
- Released: 26 January 2018
- Length: 4:04
- Label: Sto
- Composer: Charlie Charles
- Lyricist: Ghali
- Producer: Charlie Charles

Ghali singles chronology
"Habibi" (2017)	"Cara Italia" (2018)	"Peace & Love" (2018)

Music video
- "Cara Italia" on YouTube

"Cara Italia" (lit. 'Dear Italy') is a song by Italian rapper Ghali. Produced by Charlie Charles, it was released on 26 January 2018 and later included in the 2020 re-issue of the debut studio album Album.

The song peaked at number one on the Italian singles' chart and was certified triple platinum.

== Music video ==
The music video for "Cara Italia", directed by Iacopo Carapelli, was released on 27 January 2018 via Ghali's YouTube channel.

== Charts ==
=== Weekly charts ===
Weekly chart performance for "Cara Italia"
Chart (2018)	Peak position
Italy (FIMI)	1
Switzerland (Schweizer Hitparade)	73

=== Year-end charts ===
Year-end chart performance for "Cara Italia"
Chart (2018)	Position
Italy (FIMI)	9

== Certifications ==
Region	Certification	Certified units/sales
Italy (FIMI)	3× Platinum	150,000^{‡}
^{‡} Sales+streaming figures based on certification alone.
