= Bello FiGo =

Italian YouTuber and singer

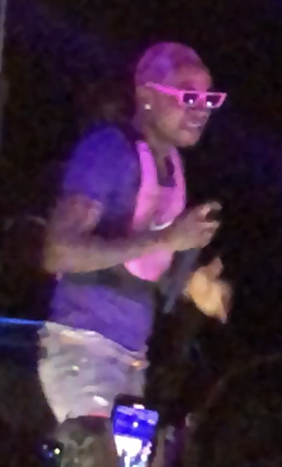
- Yeboah performing in Rieti in 2022
- Born: Paul Yeboah; Kumasi, Ghana
- Other names: BelloFiGo, BelloFiGo Gu
- Occupations: YouTuber; singer

YouTube information
- Channel: TheGucciboy1992
- Years active: 2010–present
- Genres: Comedy music; trap music
- Subscribers: 686.00 thousand
- Views: 199.33 million
- Musical career
- Genres: Comedy music; trap music; parody music
- Years active: 2010–present
- Labels: Warner Music Italy (2024–2025); Atlantic Records Italy (2025)
- Last updated: 20 July 2024

Paul Yeboah, known online by his nicknames Bello FiGo and Bello FiGo Gu, and in the past also as Bello FiGo Gucci and Gucci Boy, is a Ghanaian YouTuber and singer, known in Italy for his numerous songs parodying topics like racism, sexism and politics, some of which caused controversy.

== Life and career ==
Born in Kumasi, Bello FiGo moved to Parma, Italy, with his family in 2004. In 2007 he started to publish self-produced music videos on his own YouTube channel. At first he did that under the name "Gucci Boy", but after the company Gucci sent him a letter, he says, he changed it to "Bello Figo".

Bello FiGo's songs are done in an intentionally poor style called "trash rap" because of the low technical-stylistic quality of his rap music accompanied by bizarre, surreal, satirical and often grammatically incorrect lyrics. His music videos, published only on YouTube, have totaled millions of views (for example, the song "Non pago affitto", a parody of D4L 's song Laffy Taffy, has as of January 2021 over 30 million views) and have made Bello FiGo a phenomenon of the Internet in Italy.

After the first songs, characterized mainly by topics of vulgarity and sexism, Bello FiGo took over from 2016, with the songs "Sono bello come profugo" (I'm handsome like [a] refugee), "Non Pago Affitto" ([I] Don't Pay [the] Rent) and "Referendum Costituzionale" (Constitutional Referendum), a more political role, applying his style and its self-irony to the stereotypical arguments inherent in immigrants in Italy, described as being mostly nasty and delinquent. He also mocked, besides these stereotypes, various political figures. For this reason in 2016 he was defined by Rolling Stone music magazine as "the most politicized artist in Italy", and between the end of 2016 and the beginning of 2017, it suffered several disputes and threats of violence, even of racist background, by groups and subjects close to the far-right, that led to the cancellation of some of his concerts for fear of public tensions and disorders (in Brescia, in Borgo Virgilio, in Legnano, and in Rome).

He was the guest star in Camp Beaulard 2018. In December 2019 Bello FiGo was sued by the University of Pisa and its rector, Paolo Mancarella, that declared, after being contacted by the AGI, that the University would have done everything to defend its honour and reputation, because of a song about sex Bello FiGo has published on his official YouTube channel on 6 December 2019, "Trombo a facoltà", that was recorded inside the classes of economics of the University, which declared that its staff didn't know anything about it and didn't give its authorization to record the video. In February 2020 he released the song "CoronaVirus" that got over 5 million views on YouTube. On May 11, 2020, he released his third musical album on Spotify and YouTube. The album is called "Terra Transsese in estate".

In May 2024, Warner Music Italy announced the signing of Bello FiGo.
