= Peace & Love (Charlie Charles song) =

2018 single by Charlie Charles, Sfera Ebbasta and Ghali

- Official cover

Single by Charlie Charles, Sfera Ebbasta and Ghali
- Released: 4 May 2018
- Genre: Trap-pop
- Length: 3:02
- Label: Universal
- Songwriters: Gionata Boschetti; Ghali Amdouni; Paolo Alberto Monachetti
- Producer: Charlie Charles

Charlie Charles singles chronology
"Rap" (2017)	"Peace & Love" (2018)	"Calipso" (2019)

Sfera Ebbasta singles chronology
"Cupido" (2018)	"Peace & Love" (2018)	"Ricchi x sempre" (2018)

Ghali singles chronology
"Cara Italia" (2018)	"Peace & Love" (2018)	"Zingarello" (2018)

"Peace & Love" is a song by Italian record producer Charlie Charles, with vocals by Italian recording artists Sfera Ebbasta and Ghali. It was released by Universal Music on 4 May 2018.

The song peaked at number 1 on the FIMI single chart and was certified triple platinum in Italy.

== Personnel ==
Credits adapted from Tidal.

- Charlie Charles – producer and composer
- Sfera Ebbasta – associated performer, lyricist, composer and vocals
- Ghali – associated performer, lyricist, composer and vocals

== Charts ==
=== Weekly charts ===
Weekly chart performance for "Peace & Love"
Chart (2018)	Peak position
Italy (FIMI)	1
Switzerland (Schweizer Hitparade)	31

=== Year-end charts ===
2018 year-end chart performance for "Peace & Love"
Chart (2018)	Position
Italy (FIMI)	21

== Certifications ==
Region	Certification	Certified units/sales
Italy (FIMI)	3× Platinum	150,000^{‡}
^{‡} Sales+streaming figures based on certification alone.
