= Boogieman (Ghali song) =

- Official cover

Single by Ghali featuring Salmo

from the album DNA
- Released: 17 January 2020
- Recorded: 2022
- Length: 2:39
- Label: Sto
- Composers: Zef; Mace
- Lyricists: Ghali; Salmo
- Producers: Zef; Mace

Ghali singles chronology
"Flashback" (2019)	"Boogieman" (2020)	"Good Times" (2020)

Salmo singles chronology
"Marylean" (2019)	"Boogieman" (2020)	"Cioilflow" (2020)

Music video
- "Boogieman" on YouTube

"Boogieman" is a song by Italian rapper Ghali, with featured vocals by Salmo. It was released on 17 January 2020 as the second single of Ghali's second studio album DNA.

The song peaked at number 1 of the Italian singles' chart and was certified double platinum.

A remix version of the song by Don Patricio was released on 8 May 2020.

== Personnel ==
Credits adapted from Tidal.

- Ghali – lyricist and vocals
- Salmo – featured artist, lyricist, vocals
- Mace – producer and composer
- Zef – producer and composer
- Gigi Barocco – mastering and mixing engineer
- Alessio Buso – recording engineer

== Music video ==
The music video for "Boogieman", directed by Giulio Rosati, was released on 3 February 2020 via Ghali's YouTube channel.

== Charts ==
=== Weekly charts ===
Weekly chart performance for "Boogieman"
Chart (2020)	Peak position
Italy (FIMI)	1

=== Year-end charts ===
Year-end chart performance for "Boogieman"
Chart (2020)	Position
Italy (FIMI)	23

== Certifications ==
Region	Certification	Certified units/sales
Italy (FIMI)	2× Platinum	140,000^{‡}
^{‡} Sales+streaming figures based on certification alone.
