= Good Times (Ghali song) =

Single by Ghali

from the album DNA
- Released: 3 April 2020
- Length: 2:43
- Label: Sto
- Lyricists: Joe Kremont; Federico Mercuri; Josh Cumbee; Ghali Amdouni
- Producers: Merk & Kremont; Badhabit

Ghali singles chronology
"Boogieman" (2020)	"Good Times" (2020)	"Defuera" (2020)

Music video
- "Good Times" on YouTube

"Good Times" is a song by Italian rapper Ghali. It was produced by Merk & Kremont, and released on 3 April 2020 as the third single of Ghali's second studio album DNA.

The song peaked at number 1 of the Italian singles' chart and was certified quadruple platinum.

== Music video ==
The music video for "Good Times", directed by Giulio Rosati, was released on 25 March 2020 via Ghali's YouTube channel.

== Charts ==
=== Weekly charts ===
Weekly chart performance for "Good Times"
Chart (2020)	Peak position
Italy (FIMI)	1
Italy Airplay (EarOne)	1

=== Year-end charts ===
Year-end chart performance for "Good Times"
Chart (2020)	Position
Italy (FIMI)	5

== Certifications ==
Region	Certification	Certified units/sales
Italy (FIMI)	4× Platinum	280,000^{‡}
^{‡} Sales+streaming figures based on certification alone.
