= Sfera Ebbasta =

Italian rapper (born 1992)

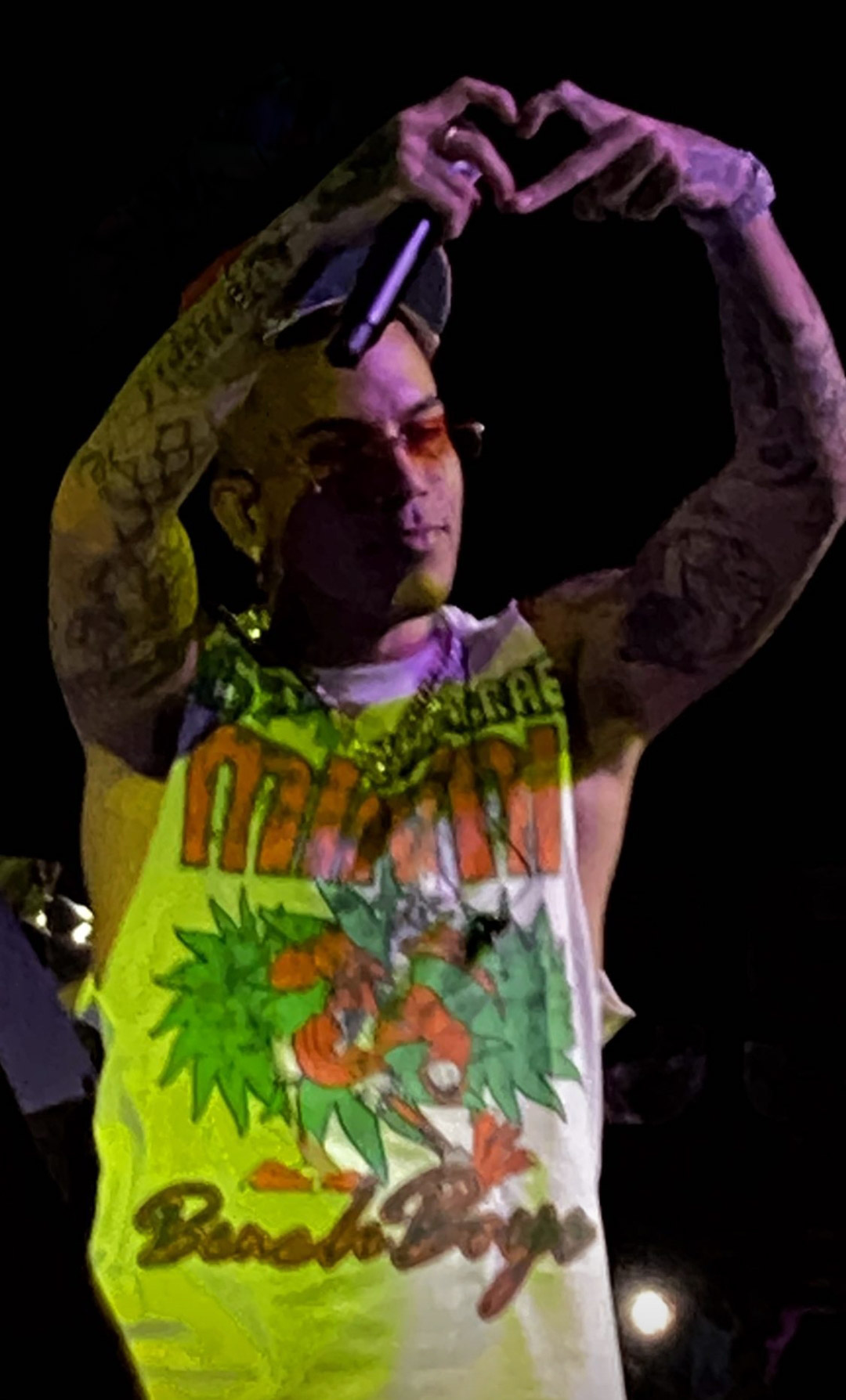
- Sfera Ebbasta in 2022
- Born: Gionata Boschetti; 7 December 1992 (age 33); Sesto San Giovanni, Lombardy, Italy
- Other names: Sfera, $€
- Occupation: Rapper
- Years active: 2011–present
- Partner: Angelina Lacour (s. 2019)
- Children: 1
- Musical career
- Genres: Trap; hip hop; pop rap; gangsta rap; Reggaeton
- Labels: BillionHeadz Music Group; Def Jam; Universal

Gionata Boschetti (Italian: [ˈdʒɔːnata boˈsketti]; born 7 December 1992), known professionally as Sfera Ebbasta (Italian: [ˈsfɛːra ebˈbasta]), is an Italian rapper. He rose to prominence after the release of XDVR (2015), recorded with the collaboration of producer Charlie Charles and DEACC, which achieved commercial success in Italy. This success was replicated with Sfera Ebbasta (2016), Rockstar (2018) and its re-issue Popstar Edition (2018), and Famoso (2020). He was the best-selling artist in Italy of the 2010s and currently holds the record for most songs reaching No. 1 in the country (24).

== Biography ==
=== First years ===
Sfera Ebbasta was born in the Milanese town of Sesto San Giovanni, but grew up in the neighbouring town of Cinisello Balsamo. His parents separated two years after his birth, and his father died when he was only 13. He dropped out of school at the age of 14.

=== First songs (2011–2013) ===
The rapper began his musical activity by uploading videos on YouTube between 2010 and 2012, without any success. In this period he started getting into contact with producer Charlie Charles, met while trying to illegally enter a Hip Hop TV concert in Milan. Thus, they formed the collective Billion Headz Money Gang, better known by the acronym BHMG. On 15 September 2013, he published Emergenza Mixtape Vol. 1.

=== XDVR (2014–2016) ===
Since November 2014, he has produced several pieces in collaboration with Charlie Charles and published them on YouTube with their videos. After the release of the song "Panette" he began to be contacted by some record labels.

On 11 June 2015 he made his debut with the first studio album, XDVR (standing for "per davvero", "for real" in English), made up by some of the singles published in the previous months, as well as other unpublished ones. Initially released as a free download, the album was reissued in a reloaded version on 23 November through Roccia Music, an independent record label of Marracash and Shablo, and distributed in the national sales circuits; in addition to the songs already present in the original, the tracklist included the unreleased "XDVRMX" (with Marracash and Luchè), "Ciny" (referring to his hometown Cinisello, of which a video clip was also shot) and "Trap Kings". The album had success in the underground musical scene and greatly increased the popularity of trap music in Italy, also receiving excellent feedback from the specialized critics; however it was also the subject of numerous criticisms as various songs spoke of life in suburban neighborhoods (mainly inspired by the street reality of his city, Cinisello Balsamo), including criminal activities and consumption of drugs such as codeine and marijuana.

On 20 January 2016 the video of the unreleased track "Blunt & Sprite" was published on YouTube, while during the same year Sfera Ebbasta featured in a track of the album Anarchie by the French rapper SCH, positively impressed by listening to the rapper's pieces during a stay in Italy: he also made the track "Cartine Cartier", produced by Charlie Charles and DJ Kore, extracted as a promotional single of the album.

=== Sfera Ebbasta (2016–2017) ===
On 9 September 2016 the rapper published his first solo studio album, the self-titled Sfera Ebbasta, distributed by the record Universal (in collaboration with Def Jam) and anticipated by the singles "BRNBQ" (which received a golden record certificate for over 25,000 copies sold), "Cartine Cartier" and "Figli di papà", the latter a platinum-certified record for having sold over 50,000 copies. In this album the rapper detached himself from the more gangsta themes of XDVR to open himself to wider topics. Supported by a promotion also at a television level, participating in broadcasts such as Matrix Chiambretti on Canale 5 and the radio program Albertino Everyday, conducted by Albertino on Radio Deejay, the album received great success in Italy, debuting at the top of the album charts, as well as entering the charts of various European countries; the album was also certified as a gold record by FIMI for having sold over 25,000 copies. Between October 2016 and March 2017, the rapper promoted the album through the Sfera Ebbasta Tour, performing in various cities of Italy.

=== Rockstar (2017–2018) ===
On 10 March 2017, Sfera Ebbasta released the single "Dexter", produced by Charlie Charles and Sick Luke.

On 22 September of the same year Gué Pequeno released the single "Lamborghini" from his album entitled Gentleman, which featured the vocal participation of Sfera Ebbasta;

On 3 January 2018 the rapper announced his third studio album, Rockstar, produced again by Charlie Charles and released on the 19th of the same month. The album was commercialized in Italian and international editions, the latter characterized by collaborations with various artists such as Tinie Tempah, Rich the Kid and Quavo; the album debuted at the top of the FIMI Album Ranking. At the same time, all 11 tracks have conquered the top twelve positions of Top Single (with the sole exception of Ed Sheeran's Perfect single, in sixth place). Also, thanks to the success of his album, the rapper became the first Italian artist to position himself among the first hundred of the world ranking compiled by Spotify.

On 13 March 2018 the rapper, along with Charlie Charles, announced the establishment of the record label Billion Headz Music Group, while on 4 May the unpublished single "Peace & Love" was released, which also involved the rapper Ghali.

On 7 December 2018 the re-edition of Rockstar, subtitled Popstar Edition, was published, including a second disc containing some remixes and the unreleased tracks "Popstar", "Uh Ah Hey" and "Happy Birthday" (the latter extracted as a single).

On the night of 7 to 8 December 2018, Sfera Ebbasta was due to perform in a nightclub in Corinaldo, near Ancona; during the wait for his appearance, at around 1 am, a panic induced stampede caused six deaths and dozens of injuries.

=== Collaborations and Famoso (2018–2024) ===
After Rockstar, Sfera Ebbasta has collaborated with many Italian and non-rappers in some tracks, without announcing a new album.

In September 2019, he was a judge on The X Factor Italy. His first featured music appearance was on 22 May 2020 when Italian rapper DrefGold released his second album Elo, in which Sfera Ebbasta was featured in the single "Elegante". On 5 June the single "Miami" was released; it is the result of a collaboration with US rapper Ronny J and Argentinian rapper Duki, while a week later it was the turn of "M' manc", a single recorded with the producer Shablo and the Neapolitan rapper Geolier.

On 26 June, Italian rapper Gué Pequeno released his seventh album, Mr. Fini, in which Sfera Ebbasta duets with him on the track "Immortale". Another collaboration occurs on 10 July when Mahmood released the single "Dorado", realized with Sfera Ebbasta himself and Colombian rapper Feid. The last collaboration was on 11 September, when Padre figlio e spirito, the second studio album of the trap group FSK Satellite, was released and Sfera Ebbasta appeared in the track "Soldi sulla carta".

In early October 2020, Sfera Ebbasta shared an Instagram teaser announcing his third studio album. On October 13, he revealed the title, *FAMO$O* (Italian for “famous,” with the S stylised as a dollar sign), and the tracklist, which for the first time includes major international collaborations with Offset, Future, Steve Aoki, Diplo, and J Balvin. The only Italian collaboration is with Marracash and Gué Pequeno on one track. Scheduled for release on November 20, 2020, the album also features production from Steve Aoki, Diplo, and London on da Track. The final track, “$€ Freestyle,” is notable for being the first song produced by Sfera Ebbasta himself.

Alongside the musical project Sfera Ebbasta released the documentary of the same name, exclusively on Prime Video, which shows some anecdotes of his musical growth and the making-of the new album.

On 28 October, he released the first single "Bottiglie privè", the unique which is produced by his producer Charlie Charles, who is executive producer of the entire album.

With the release of Famoso, a collaboration with the famous American fast food restaurant chain KFC was announced.

In July 2021, his collaboration with Italian rapper Blanco titled "Mi fai impazzire" ("You drive me crazy") peaked at No. 1 on the Italian singles chart, giving him his 18th number one single, and is certified seventh platinum by FIMI.

=== Santana Money Gang (2025-present) ===
On 11 April 2025, he released a new album Santana Money Gang. The album was done in collaboration with the Italian rapper Shiva. Sfera Ebbasta was ranked as one of the most listened to Spotify artists of the year, based on Spotify Wrapped data. For the year of 2025, he was ranked as Italy's Global #1 most listened to artist. In September 2025, he was the only Italian guest to join Drake onstage during two shows he had in Milan.

In June 2026, Sfera Ebbasta collaraboted with Colombian rapper Feid on a song titled Pienxa en Mi, part of Feid's new musical project El Moco Verde.

== Personal life ==
In January 2019, an investigation was opened against him for "instigation to the use of drugs" by the Pescara Public Prosecutor's Office, following a complaint by senators Lucio Malan and Massimo Mallegni from the political party Forza Italia.

== Discography ==
=== Studio albums ===
List of studio albums, with chart positions and certifications
Title	Album details	Peak chart positions					Certifications
Title	Album details	ITA	BEL (WA)	FRA	SPA	SWI	Certifications
XDVR (with Charlie Charles)	Released: 11 June 2015; Label: BHMG, Roccia Music; Formats: CD, download	10	—	—	—	—	FIMI: 2× Platinum
Sfera Ebbasta	Released: 9 September 2016; Label: Def Jam, Universal Music Italy; Formats: CD, download	1	31	165	—	35	FIMI: 6× Platinum
Rockstar	Released: 19 January 2018; Label: Def Jam, Universal Music Italy; Formats: CD, LP, download	1	38	133	—	2	FIMI: 8× Platinum
Famoso	Released: 20 November 2020; Label: Island; Formats: CD, LP, download	1	49	150	64	10	FIMI: 6× Platinum
X2VR	Released: 17 November 2023; Label: Island; Formats: CD, LP, download	1	97	—	98	1	FIMI: 6× Platinum
Santana Money Gang (with Shiva)	Released: 2025; Label: Cupido, Milano Ovest; Formats: CD, LP, download	1	129	—	—	3	FIMI: 4× Platinum

=== Singles ===
==== As lead artist ====
List of singles as lead artist, with chart positions, album name and certifications
Single	Year	Peak chart positions					Certifications	Album
Single	Year	ITA	AUT	GER	SPA	SWI	Certifications	Album
"BRNBQ"	2016	56	—	—	—	—	FIMI: 2× Platinum	Sfera Ebbasta
"Figli di papà"	2016	27	—	—	—	—	FIMI: 3× Platinum	Sfera Ebbasta
"Dexter"	2017	4	—	—	—	—	FIMI: Platinum	Non-album single
"Tran tran"	2017	1	—	—	—	—	FIMI: 5× Platinum	Rockstar
"Hypebae" (with Quebonafide)	2017	—	—	—	—	—		Dla fanów eklektyki
"Rockstar"	2018	2	—	—	—	76	FIMI: 3× Platinum	Rockstar
"Cupido" (featuring Quavo)	2018	1	—	—	—	48	FIMI: 4× Platinum	Rockstar
"Peace & Love" (with Charlie Charles and Ghali)	2018	1	—	—	—	31	FIMI: 3× Platinum	Non-album single
"Ricchi x sempre"	2018	4	—	—	—	—	FIMI: 3× Platinum	Rockstar
"Pablo" (with Rvssian)	2018	1	—	—	—	48	FIMI: 2× Platinum	Rockstar (Popstar Edition)
"Happy Birthday"	2018	1	—	—	—	54	FIMI: 2× Platinum	Rockstar (Popstar Edition)
"Mademoiselle"	2019	2	—	—	—	—	FIMI: 2× Platinum	Non-album singles
"Soldi in nero" (with Shiva)	2019	2	—	—	—	—	FIMI: Platinum	Non-album singles
"Miami" (with Ronny J and Duki)	2020	83	—	—	—	—		Jupiter
"M' manc" (with Shablo and Geolier)	2020	1	—	—	—	—	FIMI: 6× Platinum	Non-album single
"Bottiglie privè"	2020	1	—	—	—	72	FIMI: 3× Platinum	Famoso
"Baby" (featuring J Balvin)	2020	1	—	—	99	22	FIMI: 3× Platinum	Famoso
"Mambo" (with Steve Aoki, Willy William, Sean Paul, El Alfa and Play-N-Skillz)	2021	91	—	—	—	—		Non-album single
"Hollywood" (featuring Diplo)	2021	3	—	—	—	—	FIMI: 2× Platinum	Famoso
"Mi fai impazzire" (with Blanco)	2021	1	—	—	—	56	FIMI: 9× Platinum	Non-album single
"Italiano Anthem" (with Rvssian)	2022	2	—	—	—	74	FIMI: Platinum	Italiano
"Mamma mia" (with Rvssian)	2022	2	—	—	—	—	FIMI: 3× Platinum	Italiano
"Orange" (with Luciano)	2023	8	8	11	—	7	FIMI: Gold	Non-album single
"Location" (with Noizy)	2023	13	—	—	—	67	FIMI: Gold	Alpha
"Milano" (with Bia and Fivio Foreign)	2023	4	—	—	—	—	FIMI: Gold	Really Her
"Anche stasera" (featuring Elodie)	2023	3	—	—	—	—	FIMI: 3× Platinum	X2VR
"Neon" (with Shiva)	2025	1	—	—	—	74	FIMI: Platinum	Santana Money Gang
"Ayayay" (with Dystinct)	2026	10	—	—	—	—	FIMI: Gold	Non-album singles
"Lontano"	2026	1	—	—	—	97		Non-album singles

==== As featured artist ====
List of singles as featured artist, with chart positions, album name and certifications
Title	Year	Peak chart positions		Certifications	Album
Title	Year	ITA	SWI	Certifications	Album
"Tutti i giorni" (Capo Plaza featuring Sfera Ebbasta)	2014	—	—		Non-album single
"Scooteroni RMX" (Marracash and Guè Pequeno featuring Sfera Ebbasta)	2016	62	—	FIMI: 3× Platinum	Santeria (Voodoo Edition)
"Bimbi" (Charlie Charles featuring Izi, Rkomi, Tedua, Ghali and Sfera Ebbasta)	2017	3	—	FIMI: 2× Platinum	Non-album single
"Lamborghini" (Guè Pequeno featuring Sfera Ebbasta and Elettra Lamborghini)	2017	1	—	FIMI: 4× Platinum	Gentleman
"Stamm fort" (Luchè featuring Sfera Ebbasta)	2019	1	—	FIMI: 2× Platinum	Potere
"Cabriolet" (Salmo featuring Sfera Ebbasta)	2019	1	—	FIMI: 2× Platinum	Playlist
"Calipso" (Charlie Charles with Dardust featuring Mahmood, Sfera Ebbasta and Fabri Fibra)	2019	1	—	FIMI: 4× Platinum	Non-album single
"Elegante" (DrefGold featuring Sfera Ebbasta)	2020	2	—	FIMI: Platinum	Elo
"Dorado" (Mahmood featuring Sfera Ebbasta and Feid)	2020	10	—	FIMI: 2× Platinum	Ghettolimpo
"Je ne sais pas" (Lous and the Yakuza featuring Sfera Ebbasta and Shablo)	2021	3	—	FIMI: Gold	Non-album single
"Di notte" (Ernia featuring Carl Brave and Sfera Ebbasta)	2021	17	—	FIMI: Platinum	Gemelli
"Tu mi hai capito" (Madame featuring Sfera Ebbasta)	2021	2	—	FIMI: 4× Platinum	Madame
"Mi piace" (Tony Effe featuring Sfera Ebbasta)	2021	10	—	FIMI: Gold	Untouchable
"Solite pare" (Sick Luke featuring Tha Supreme and Sfera Ebbasta)	2022	1	—	FIMI: 2× Platinum	X2
"Siri" (Thasup featuring Lazza and Sfera Ebbasta)	2022	1	92	FIMI: 5× Platinum	Carattere speciale
"Téléphone" (Booba featuring Sfera Ebbasta)	2022	50	—	FIMI: Gold	Non-album singles
"Hace Calor RMX" (Kaleb di Masi and Omar Valera featuring Sfera Ebbasta)	2022	5	—	FIMI: 3× Platinum	Non-album singles
"Alleluia" (Shiva featuring Sfera Ebbasta)	2022	1	—	FIMI: 2× Platinum	Milano Demons
"X caso" (Geolier featuring Sfera Ebbasta)	2023	1	—	FIMI: 4× Platinum	Il coraggio dei bambini
"Gelosa" (Finesse featuring Shiva, Sfera Ebbasta and Guè)	2023	4	—	FIMI: 5× Platinum	TBA
"Mirage" (AriBeatz featuring Ozuna, Gims and Sfera Ebbasta)	2023	9	36	FIMI: 2× Platinum	TBA
"Bon ton" (Drillionaire featuring Lazza, Blanco, Sfera Ebbasta and Michelangelo)	2023	1	87	FIMI: 5× Platinum	10
"Yakuza" (Elodie featuring Sfera Ebbasta and Rvssian)	2025	4	—	FIMI: Gold	Mi ami mi odi

=== Other charted songs ===
List of other charted songs, with chart positions, album name
Title	Year	Peak chart positions	Certifications	Album
Title	Year	ITA	Certifications	Album
"Visiera a Becco"	2016	40	FIMI: 4× Platinum	Sfera Ebbasta
"Fragile"	2023	9	FIMI: Gold	X2VR
"Ciao Bella" (with Anna)	2023	6	FIMI: Platinum	X2VR
"G63" (with Lazza and Shiva)	2023	3	FIMI: Platinum	X2VR
"VDLC"	2023	2	FIMI: 2× Platinum	X2VR
"Momenti no" (with Tedua)	2023	7	FIMI: Platinum	X2VR
"Milano bene"	2023	11	FIMI: Gold	X2VR
"3uphon" (with Thasup and Tony Effe)	2023	8	FIMI: Platinum	X2VR
"Complicato" (with Paky)	2023	10	FIMI: Gold	X2VR
"Gol" (with Cosimo Fini)	2023	11	FIMI: Platinum	X2VR
"Calcolatrici" (with Geolier, Simba La Rue and Baby Gang)	2023	4	FIMI: 2× Platinum	X2VR
"15 piani" (with Marracash)	2023	1	FIMI: 2× Platinum	X2VR
"SNTMNG" (with Shiva)	2025	6	FIMI: Gold	Santana Money Gang
"NON METTERCI BECCO" (with Shiva)	2025	2	FIMI: Gold	Santana Money Gang
"SEI PERSA" (with Shiva)	2025	3	FIMI: Gold	Santana Money Gang
"MOLECOLE SPRITE" (with Shiva)	2025	7		Santana Money Gang
"MAYBACH" (with Shiva)	2025	8	FIMI: Gold	Santana Money Gang
"MNGSNT" (with Shiva)	2025	11		Santana Money Gang
"D&G" (with Shiva)	2025	5		Santana Money Gang
"VVS CARTIER" (with Shiva)	2025	12	FIMI: Platinum	Santana Money Gang
"OVER (demo)" (with Shiva)	2025	4		Santana Money Gang
"COME SE NON FOSSI NEI GUAI" (with Shiva)	2025	10	FIMI: Platinum	Santana Money Gang
"PARANOIA" (with Shiva)	2025	13		Santana Money Gang
"Orologi"	2025	61		XDVR Anniversar10
"Prega X Noi"	2025	56		XDVR Anniversar10

=== Guest appearances ===
Title	Year	Other artist(s)	Album
"Tesla"	2018	Capo Plaza, DrefGold	20
"Wave"	2018	DrefGold	Kanaglia
"Borsello"	2018	Guè Pequeno, DrefGold	Sinatra
"Mon cheri"	2019	Rkomi	Dove gli occhi non arrivano
"48H"	2019	Izi	Aletheia
"Corazón morado"	2019	Elettra Lamborghini	Twerking Queen
"Gigolò"	2019	Lazza	Re Mida Aurum
"Supreme – L'ego"	2019	Marracash, Tha Supreme	Persona
"McQueen"	2020	Miami Yacine	Welcome 2 Miami
"Immortale"	2020	Guè Pequeno	Mr. Fini
"Soldi sulla carta"	2020	FSK Satellite	Padre figlio e spirito
"Demonio"	2021	Capo Plaza	Plaza
"Nuovo Range"	2021	Rkomi	Taxi Driver
"Cry Later"	2022	Noyz Narcos, Luchè	Virus
"Una lacrima"	2022	Irama	Il giorno in cui ho smesso di pensare
"Piove"	2022	Lazza	Sirio
"Pornstar"	2022	Gemitaiz	Eclissi
"X caso"	2023	Geolier, Luchè	Il coraggio dei bambini
"Cookies N' Cream"	2023	Guè, Anna	Madreperla
"On Fire (Paid in Full)"	2023	Emis Killa	Effetto notte
"Hoe"	2023	Tedua	La Divina Commedia
"Un milione di volte"	2023	Shiva	Santana Season
