= Ghali (rapper) =

Italian rapper (born 1993)

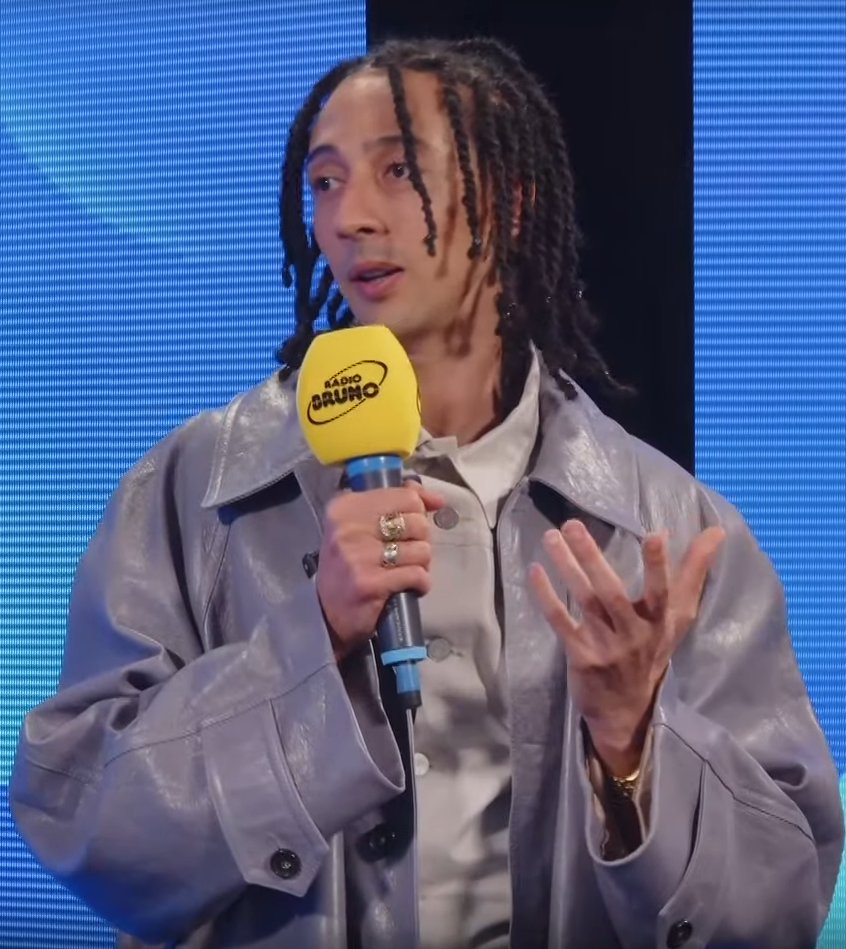
- Ghali in 2024

Background information
- Also known as: Fobia, Ghali Foh
- Born: Ghali Amdouni; 21 May 1993 (age 33); Milan, Italy
- Genres: Pop rap; trap
- Occupations: Rapper; singer
- Years active: 2011-present
- Labels: Tanta Roba; Sto; Warner; Atlantic

Ghali Amdouni (born 21 May 1993), known mononymously as Ghali, is an Italian rapper of Tunisian origins. He originally started his career using the pseudonym Fobia. One of the leading figures in Italian rap, Ghali released two albums reaching the top 10 of the Italian charts and released many successful hit singles, with five top positions in the FIMI chart, including "Ninna nanna", "Cara Italia", "Peace & Love" (with Charlie Charles and Sfera Ebbasta), "Boogieman" (featuring Salmo) and "Good Times".

As of 2020 Ghali had sold over 1.6 million copies in Italy, collaborating with numerous Italian artists such as Fedez, Gué Pequeno, Sfera Ebbasta, Salmo, and international artists like Ed Sheeran, Stormzy and Travis Scott. In October 2016, Ghali released his hugely successful single "Ninna nanna", solely on Spotify, becoming the first single to debut at number one only with streaming, selling over 200,000 copies. The video also hit 100 million views on YouTube, a record for a debut Tunisian-Italian artist.

Besides the favor of the musical press, Ghali was also praised by Italy's literary scene and major newspapers, with writers like Roberto Saviano calling him "a blessing" in La Repubblica and Vanni Santoni praising his poetical skills in Il Corriere della Sera. In 2017 his album Album won the "Lunezia Rap Prize" for the musical-literary value.

== Career ==
Born in Milan to Tunisian parents, Ghali lived in Baggio. He started to approach hip hop using the pseudonym Fobia, then became Ghali. In 2011, he joined Troupe D'Elite, a group that also included rapper Ernia. The group signed with Gué Pequeno’s label Tanta Roba, and Ghali toured with Fedez, joining him on his 2011 tour. The following year, he released with the group the EP homonyms Troupe D’Elite, which was criticised by some music critics as a disfigurement of Italian and international rap. In July 2013, Ghali released Leader Mixtape, collaborating with artists such as Sfera Ebbasta and Maruego. One year later, Troupe D'Elite cancelled their contract with Tanta Roba and released the album Il mio giorno preferito, available for free download on the Honiro platform.

On 14 October 2016, through Sto Records, the debut single "Ninna nanna" was released on Spotify, which set new streaming records in Italy, achieving the highest number of listeners in the first day, and debuting at the top position of the Italian Singles Chart with 200,000 copies sold in total. On 3 February 2017 it was the turn of the second single "Pizza kebab", reaching number 3 on the Fimi's chart, and on the following 12 May the hit "Happy Days" which reached number 4 and sold over 200,000 copies. On 27 May 2017 he released his first studio album, entitled Album, which debuted at the second position of the Italian Albums Chart and sold 150,000 copies. The album also debuted at number 24 of Swiss Album Charts and 96 of Belgium Albums Chart. At the same time, eight other of the album's tracks entered the Singles Chart, selling a total of over 325,000 certified copies. The last single "Habibi" peaked at number seven of FIMI's chart and received four platinum certifications.

On 26 January 2018 Ghali made the single "Cara Italia" available for streaming, becoming the second single to reach the first position in Italy, later receiving the three platinum certifications. On 20 April 2018 was released 20 by Capo Plaza, which features the song "Ne è valsa la pena" in collaboration with the rapper. A few weeks later it was the turn of a new unreleased single, "Peace & Love", released together with Sfera Ebbasta and producer Charlie Charles, which made his debut at the top of the Singles Chart and became a summer hit. Before summer the rapper released another single, "Zingarello", made with producer Sick Luke.

On 28 September 2018, "Habibi" was announced as part of the FIFA 19 soundtrack.

On 15 March 2019 it was he released the single "I Love You", becoming the rapper's ninth top 10 hit, and on 21 June 2019 two singles were released simultaneously, "Turbococco" and "Hasta la vista", which entered into the top 50. Ghali also participated in the second album by rapper Rkomi, Dove gli occhi non arrivano, on the track "Boogie Nights" and two international remixes of "Vossi Bop" by Stormzy and "Antisocial" with Ed Sheeran and Travis Scott.

On 11 November 2019, he released his tenth top 10 single, "Flashback", the first single from his upcoming second studio album. After the number one collaboration "Boogieman" with rapper Salmo, Ghali published the album DNA, featuring more hip hop and pop music rather than trap sounds, which became his first number one album and received the gold certification. With the album he released the topper single "Good Times".

In his second studio album, on the track "Vossi Bop (Remix)" featuring Stormzy, Ghali references Italian Interior Minister and leader of the right-wing political party Lega, Matteo Salvini, with the lyrics, "Salvini says that those who arrived by raft can't stay .it but must stay .com". Ghali characterized Salvini as a fascist, stating, "As an artist, my primary role isn't political, but my music reflects my personal experiences. Rap, which has its roots in social critique, provided the appropriate platform to address the exploitation of fear to create division. Like Stormzy addressing issues in the UK, I felt it was important to voice my opposition to Salvini's views."

In June 2021, Ghali released the single "Chiagne ancora" featuring Liberato and J Lord.

Ghali competed in the Sanremo Music Festival 2024 with the song "Casa mia".

He performed at the 2026 Winter Olympics opening ceremony, held in Milan's San Siro stadium. Ghali was tasked with speaking about peace and recited the poem Promemoria (Memorandum) by Italian poet and children's author Gianni Rodari. The lines included: “There are things you must never do, not by day nor by night, not by sea nor by shore: for example, war.”

== Personal life ==
Ghali is Muslim and was born to Tunisian parents. His father was sent to prison when he was a child and his mother raised him on her own. His mother fell ill with cancer at age 38 and then recovered. She is also his personal assistant, as of 2019.

Ghali's passion for rap and songwriting made him often misunderstood by his schoolmates: he said he was often bullied, but this experience strengthened him and pushed him to fight more and more.

== Discography ==
- Album (2017)
- Lunga vita a Sto (compilation, 2017)
- DNA (2020)
- Sensazione ultra (2022)
- Pizza kebab Vol. 1 (2023)
