= Italy in the Eurovision Song Contest 2023 =

- Eurovision Song Contest 2023
- Participating broadcaster: Radiotelevisione italiana (RAI)
- Country: Italy
- Selection process: Sanremo Music Festival 2023
- Selection date: 11 February 2023

Competing entry
- Song: "Due vite"
- Artist: Marco Mengoni
- Songwriters: Marco Mengoni; Davide Petrella; Davide Simonetta

Placement
- Final result: 4th, 350 points

Participation chronology

Italy was represented at the Eurovision Song Contest 2023 with the song "Due vite", written by Marco Mengoni, Davide Petrella, and Davide Simonetta, and performed by Mengoni himself. The Italian participating broadcaster, Radiotelevisione italiana (RAI), announced in June 2022 that the winning performer(s) of the Sanremo Music Festival 2023 would earn the right to represent them at the contest.

== Background ==
Prior to the 2023 contest, Radiotelevisione italiana (RAI) had participated in the Eurovision Song Contest representing Italy forty-six times since its first entry at the inaugural contest in 1956. Since then, it has won the contest on three occasions: in 1964 with the song "Non ho l'età" performed by Gigliola Cinquetti, in 1990 with "Insieme: 1992" by Toto Cutugno, and in 2021 with "Zitti e buoni" by Måneskin. RAI has withdrawn from the Eurovision Song Contest a number of times, with its most recent absence spanning from 1998 until 2010. It made its return in 2011, and its entry "Madness of Love", performed by Raphael Gualazzi, placed second—its highest result, to that point, since its victory in 1990. A number of top 10 placements followed in subsequent editions, including its third victory in 2021. As hosts in 2022, it placed sixth with "Brividi" by Mahmood and Blanco.

As part of its duties as participating broadcaster, RAI organises the selection of its entry in the Eurovision Song Contest and broadcasts the event in the country. Between 2011 and 2013 and since 2015, the Sanremo Music Festival has regularly been used to select the Italian entrant to the contest, at first through an intermediate stage of internal selection among the contestants, and after 2014 (when a full internal selection took place), the winner of the festival has always earned the right of first refusal to represent Italy in the Eurovision Song Contest.

== Before Eurovision ==
=== Sanremo Music Festival 2023 ===
Italian broadcaster RAI confirmed that the performer that would represent Italy at the Eurovision Song Contest 2023 would be selected from the competing artists at the Sanremo Music Festival 2023, the 73rd edition of the event. According to the rules of Sanremo 2023, the winner of the festival will earn the right to represent Italy at the Eurovision Song Contest, but in case the artist is not available or refuses the offer, the organisers of the event reserve the right to choose someone else via their own criteria. The competition took place between 7 and 11 February 2023, with the winner being selected on the last day of the festival.

For the fourth year in a row, Amadeus served as the artistic director and presenter of Sanremo, alongside Eurovision 1970 participant Gianni Morandi, and was joined on stage by Chiara Ferragni, Francesca Fagnani, Paola Egonu and Chiara Francini, each on a different night. 28 artists, six of which directly qualifying from the newcomers' section Sanremo Giovani (held on 16 December 2022), competed in the festival. This took place over the course of five consecutive nights, articulated as follows:

- On each of the first two nights, half of the entrants performed their songs, and were judged by three separate panels from a jury of journalists.
- On the third night, all of the songs were performed and voted through a 50/50 split system by means of televoting and a demoscopic jury. The results were combined with those of the previous nights.
- On the fourth night, the contestants each performed a cover of a song, and were voted by the same system used on the first three nights.
- On the last night, the 28 entries once again performed, going through the same system used on the first four nights, to be added up to the results obtained that far; ultimately, a final voting round (again a sum of televoting and the two juries) was held among the top 5, which determined the winner.

The first 22 competing artists were announced on 4 December 2022. On 16 December, the six artists qualifying from the Sanremo Giovani section were announced, alongside the titles of all 28 competing songs. Two former Eurovision Song Contest entrants were among the competing artists: Anna Oxa (1989) and Marco Mengoni (2013). Additionally, Mara Sattei's song was written by Damiano David, who won the 2021 contest as the vocalist and frontman of Måneskin.

Artist	Song	Songwriter(s)
Anna Oxa	"Sali (Canto dell'anima)"	Anna Hoxha, Fiorenzo Zanotti, Francesco Bianconi, Giuseppe Rinaldi
Ariete	"Mare di guai"	Arianna Del Giaccio, Dario Faini, Edoardo D'Erme, Vincenzo Centrella
Articolo 31	"Un bel viaggio"	Alessandro Aleotti, Antonio Colangelo, Daniele Silvestri, Federica Abbate, Luca Paolo Aleotti, Wladimiro Perrini
Colapesce Dimartino	"Splash"	Antonio Di Martino, Lorenzo Urciullo
Colla Zio	"Non mi va"	Andrea Arminio, Andrea Malatesta, Francesco Lamperti, Giorgio Pesenti, Tommaso Bernasconi, Tommaso Manzoni
Coma_Cose	"L'addio"	Carlo Frigerio, Fabio Dalè, Fausto Zanardelli, Francesca Mesiano
Elodie	"Due"	Elodie Di Patrizi, Federica Abbate, Francesco Catitti, Jacope Ettorre
Gianluca Grignani	"Quando ti manca il fiato"	Enrico Melozzi, Gianluca Grignani
Gianmaria	"Mostro"	Antonio Filippelli, Gianmarco Manilardi, Gianmaria Volpato, Vincenzo Centrella, Vito Petrozzino
Giorgia	"Parole dette male"	Alberto Bianco, Francesco Roccati, Massimiliano Dagani, Mario Marco Gianclaudio Fracchiolla
I Cugini di Campagna	"Lettera 22"	Fabio Gargiulo, Dario Mangiaracina, Veronica Lucchesi
Lazza	"Cenere"	Dario Faini, Davide Pretella, Jacopo Lazzarini
LDA	"Se poi domani"	Alessandro Caiazza, Luca D'Alessio
Leo Gassmann	"Terzo cuore"	Giorgio Pesenti, Leonardo Gassman, Marco Paganelli, Riccardo Zanotti
Levante	"Vivo"	Claudia Lagona
Madame	"Il bene nel male"	Francesca Calearo, Iacopo Sinigaglia, Nicolas Biasin
Mara Sattei	"Duemilaminuti"	Damiano David, Davide Mattei, Enrico Brun
Marco Mengoni	"Due vite"	Davide Pretella, Davide Simonetta, Marco Mengoni
Modà	"Lasciami"	Enrico Palmosi, Francesco Silvestre
Mr. Rain	"Supereroi"	Federica Abbate, Lorenzo Vizzini Bisaccia, Mattia Balardi
Olly	"Polvere"	Emanuele Lovito, Federico Olivieri, Julien Boverod
Paola e Chiara	"Furore"	Alessandro La Cava, Chiara Iezzi, Paola Iezzi, Eugenio Maimone, Federico Mercuri, Giordano Cremona, Jacopo Ettore, Leonardo Grillotti
Rosa Chemical	"Made in Italy"	Davide Simonetta, Manuel Franco Rocati, Oscar Inglese, Paolo Antonacci
Sethu	"Cause perse"	Giorgio De Lauri, Marco De Lauri
Shari	"Egoista"	Luciano Fenudi, Maurizio Pisciottu, Riccardo Puddu, Shari Noioso
Tananai	"Tango"	Alberto Cotta Ramusino, Alessandro Raina, Davide Simonetta, Paolo Antonacci
Ultimo	"Alba"	Niccolò Moriconi
Will	"Stupido"	Andrea Pugliese, Simone Cremonini, William Busetti

==== Final ====
The 28 Big Artists each performed their entry again for a final time on 11 February 2023. A combination of public televoting, press jury voting and demoscopic jury voting selected the top five to face a superfinal vote, then the winner of Sanremo 2023 was decided by a combination of public televoting (34%), demoscopic jury voting (33%) and press jury voting (33%). Marco Mengoni was declared the winner of the contest with the song "Due vite".

Final – 11 February 2023
R/O	Artist	Song	Place
1	Elodie	"Due"	9
2	Colla Zio	"Non mi va"	20
3	Mara Sattei	"Duemilaminuti"	19
4	Tananai	"Tango"	5
5	Colapesce Dimartino	"Splash"	10
6	Giorgia	"Parole dette male"	6
7	Modà	"Lasciami"	11
8	Ultimo	"Alba"	4
9	Lazza	"Cenere"	2
10	Marco Mengoni	"Due vite"	1
11	Rosa Chemical	"Made in Italy"	8
12	I Cugini di Campagna	"Lettera 22"	21
13	Madame	"Il bene nel male"	7
14	Ariete	"Mare di guai"	14
15	Mr. Rain	"Supereroi"	3
16	Paola e Chiara	"Furore"	17
17	Levante	"Vivo"	23
18	LDA	"Se poi domani"	15
19	Coma_Cose	"L'addio"	13
20	Olly	"Polvere"	24
21	Articolo 31	"Un bel viaggio"	16
22	Will	"Stupido"	26
23	Leo Gassmann	"Terzo cuore"	18
24	Gianmaria	"Mostro"	22
25	Anna Oxa	"Sali (Canto dell'anima)"	25
26	Shari	"Egoista"	27
27	Gianluca Grignani	"Quando ti manca il fiato"	12
28	Sethu	"Cause perse"	28

Superfinal – 11 February 2023
R/O	Artist	Song	Demoscopic jury (33%)	Press jury (33%)	Televote (34%)	Total	Place
1	Ultimo	"Alba"	4	5	20.39%	12.25%	4
2	Tananai	"Tango"	5	3	11.15%	11.15%	5
3	Lazza	"Cenere"	3	2	18.28%	16.64%	2
4	Marco Mengoni	"Due vite"	1	1	32.31%	45.53%	1
5	Mr. Rain	"Supereroi"	2	4	17.87%	14.43%	3

== At Eurovision ==
According to Eurovision rules, all nations with the exceptions of the host country and the "Big Five" (France, Germany, Italy, Spain and the United Kingdom) are required to qualify from one of two semi-finals in order to compete in the final; the top ten countries from each semi-final progress to the final. As a member of the "Big Five", Italy automatically qualified to compete in the final on 13 May 2023. In addition to its participation in the final, Italy was also required to broadcast and vote in one of the two semi-finals. This was decided via a draw held during the semi-final allocation draw on 31 January 2023, when it was announced that Italy would be voting in the first semi-final.

=== Voting ===
==== Points awarded to Italy ====
Points awarded to Italy (Final)
Score	Televote	Jury
12 points	Albania; Malta	Austria; Croatia; Romania; San Marino; Slovenia
10 points	Germany; Switzerland	Malta; Moldova; Spain
8 points	Austria; Croatia; Slovenia	Georgia; Switzerland
7 points	Belgium; France; Israel; Norway; Romania; San Marino	Belgium; Sweden
6 points	Cyprus; Lithuania; Portugal; Spain; Sweden	Azerbaijan; Finland; Norway; Poland
5 points	Georgia; Greece; Moldova	Cyprus; Estonia
4 points	Azerbaijan	Czech Republic; Germany
3 points	Armenia; Denmark; Netherlands	Latvia
2 points	Estonia; Serbia	Albania; France; Serbia; Ukraine; United Kingdom
1 point	Czech Republic; Iceland	Australia

==== Points awarded by Italy ====
Points awarded by Italy (Semi-final)
Score	Televote
12 points	Moldova
10 points	Norway
8 points	Czech Republic
7 points	Finland
6 points	Israel
5 points	Croatia
4 points	Switzerland
3 points	Sweden
2 points	Portugal
1 point	Serbia

Points awarded by Italy (Final)
Score	Televote	Jury
12 points	Moldova	Israel
10 points	Norway	Ukraine
8 points	Ukraine	Sweden
7 points	Albania	Czech Republic
6 points	Finland	Estonia
5 points	Israel	Armenia
4 points	Croatia	Switzerland
3 points	Sweden	Lithuania
2 points	Czech Republic	Belgium
1 point	Switzerland	Serbia

==== Detailed voting results ====
The following members comprised the Italian jury:

- Carlo Massarini
- Fabrizio D'Alessio
- Maria Grazia Fontana
- Stefania Zizzari
- Tiziana Donati (Tosca)

Detailed voting results from Italy (Semi-final 1)
R/O	Country	Televote		
R/O	Country	Percentage	Rank	Points
01	Norway	16.54%	2	10
02	Malta	2.21%	12	
03	Serbia	3.33%	10	1
04	Latvia	3.02%	11	
05	Portugal	3.97%	9	2
06	Ireland	1.94%	14	
07	Croatia	6.33%	6	5
08	Switzerland	5.73%	7	4
09	Israel	7.97%	5	6
10	Moldova	23.39%	1	12
11	Sweden	5.06%	8	3
12	Azerbaijan	1.70%	15	
13	Czech Republic	8.47%	3	8
14	Netherlands	1.98%	13	
15	Finland	8.35%	4	7

Detailed voting results from Italy (Final)
R/O	Country	Jury							Televote		
R/O	Country	Juror A	Juror B	Juror C	Juror D	Juror E	Rank	Points	Percentage	Rank	Points
01	Austria	10	6	11	8	14	12		1.68%	19	
02	Portugal	13	11	12	18	12	16		1.34%	21	
03	Switzerland	16	12	8	2	9	7	4	3.29%	10	1
04	Poland	15	24	13	17	25	19		2.61%	13	
05	Serbia	9	4	14	7	11	10	1	1.96%	15	
06	France	8	13	15	11	13	15		1.82%	16	
07	Cyprus	17	21	5	12	4	11		2.94%	11	
08	Spain	3	9	16	16	19	13		1.31%	22	
09	Sweden	14	3	6	3	3	3	8	3.53%	8	3
10	Albania	22	22	17	25	23	24		8.31%	4	7
11	Italy										
12	Estonia	7	20	2	13	2	5	6	1.56%	20	
13	Finland	21	23	18	20	24	23		6.09%	5	6
14	Czech Republic	2	5	7	4	8	4	7	3.37%	9	2
15	Australia	20	19	9	19	16	18		1.23%	23	
16	Belgium	18	10	4	6	10	9	2	2.81%	12	
17	Armenia	6	18	3	5	5	6	5	1.22%	24	
18	Moldova	23	25	19	23	20	25		15.80%	1	12
19	Ukraine	1	2	20	9	1	2	10	12.64%	3	8
20	Norway	24	17	21	21	17	21		12.98%	2	10
21	Germany	19	14	22	24	18	20		2.00%	14	
22	Lithuania	5	8	10	14	6	8	3	1.70%	17	
23	Israel	4	1	1	1	15	1	12	3.90%	6	5
24	Slovenia	12	7	23	15	7	14		1.69%	18	
25	Croatia	25	16	24	22	21	22		3.68%	7	4
26	United Kingdom	11	15	25	10	22	17		0.54%	25	
