= Tananai discography =

Discography of Italian singer-songwriter and record producer Tananai

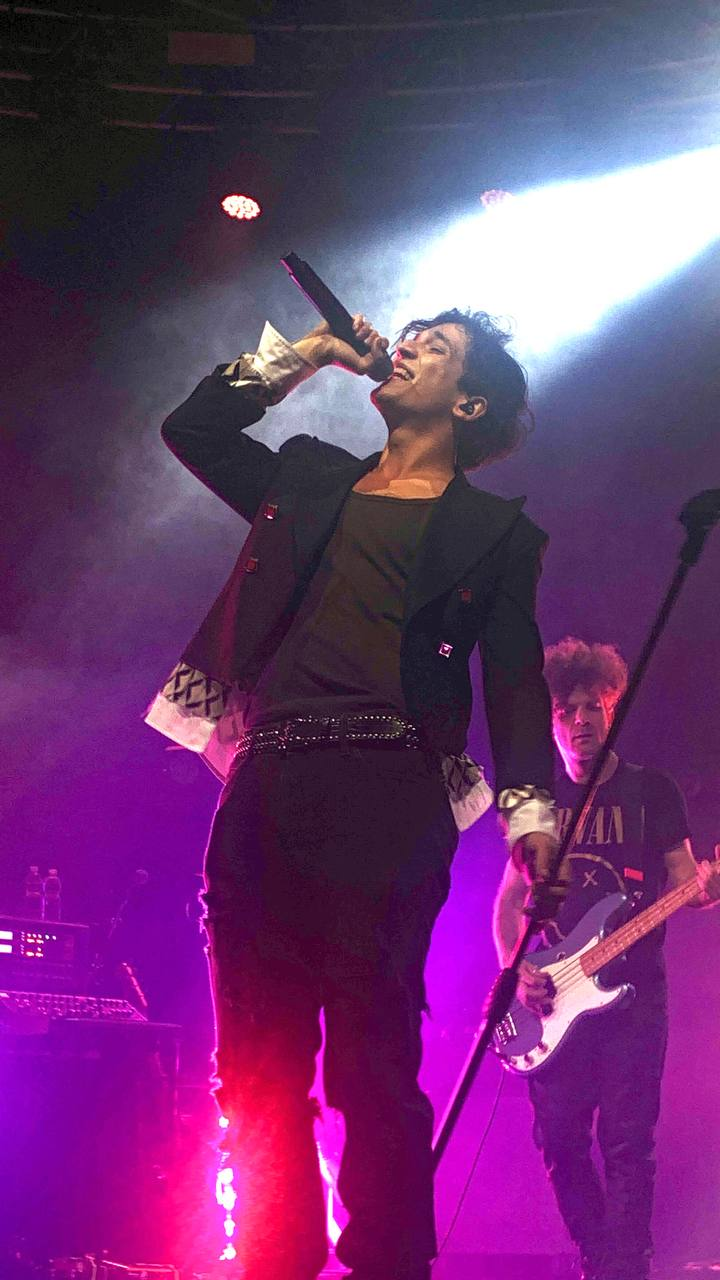
- Tananai in concert in Milan in 2022
- Studio albums: 3
- EPs: 1
- Singles: 31

The discography of Italian Italian singer-songwriter and record producer Tananai consists of three studio albums, one EP and thirty-one singles.

== Studio albums ==
List of studio albums with album details
Title	Album details	Peak chart positions	Certifications
Title	Album details	ITA	Certifications
To Discover and Forget (credited as Not For Us)	Released: 13 October 2017; Label: Universal	—	
Rave, eclissi	Released: 25 November 2022; Label: Capitol Records, Universal Music Italia; Format: CD, LP, digital download	3	FIMI: 4× Platinum
CalmoCobra	Released: 18 October 2024; Label: Eclectic Records, Universal Music Italia; Format: CD, LP, digital download	1	FIMI: Platinum

== Extended plays ==
List of EPs with details
Title	EP details
Piccoli boati	Released: 21 February 2020; Label: Universal, Sugar Music

== Singles ==
=== As lead artist ===
List of singles, with selected chart positions, showing year released and album name
Title	Year	Peak chart positions		Certifications	Album
Title	Year	ITA	SWI	Certifications	Album
"A Diamond" (Note: Credited as Not for Us.) (featuring Anna McDougal)	2015	—	—		Non-album single
"Knit Me a Coffin" (featuring Chance Fischer)	2016	—	—		To Discover and Forget
"Remember" (featuring Ben Alessi)	2016	—	—		To Discover and Forget
"You Told Me"	2017	—	—		To Discover and Forget
"Days" (featuring Jamie Sung)	2017	—	—		To Discover and Forget
"Volersi male"	2019	—	—		Non-album singles
"Ichnusa"	2019	—	—		Non-album singles
"Bear Grylls"	2019	—	—		Non-album singles
"Calcutta"	2019	—	—		Non-album singles
"Giugno"	2020	—	—		Piccoli boati
"Baby Goddamn"	2021	3	—	FIMI: 5× Platinum	Rave, eclissi
"Maleducazione"	2021	—	—		Rave, eclissi
"Esagerata"	2021	—	—	FIMI: Gold	Rave, eclissi
"Sesso occasionale"	2022	8	—	FIMI: 3× Platinum	Rave, eclissi
"Comincia tu" (with Rosa Chemical)	2022	—	—		Non-album single
"La dolce vita" (with Fedez and Mara Sattei)	2022	1	44	FIMI: 6× Platinum; IFPI SWI: Gold	Disumano
"Pasta"	2022	48	—	FIMI: Gold	Rave, eclissi
"Abissale"	2022	11	—	FIMI: 3× Platinum	Rave, eclissi
"Tango"	2023	2	71	FIMI: 6× Platinum	Rave, eclissi
"Un altro mondo" (with Merk & Kremont and Marracash)	2023	17	—	FIMI: 2× Platinum	Non-album single
"Veleno"	2024	28	—	FIMI: Platinum	CalmoCobra
"Ho fatto un sogno" (with Madame and Rose Villain)	2024	17	—		Non-album single
"Storie brevi" (with Annalisa)	2024	2	—	FIMI: 3× Platinum	CalmoCobra
"Ragni"	2024	16	—	FIMI: Gold	CalmoCobra
"Punk love storia"	2024	62	—		CalmoCobra
"Booster"	2024	43	—	FIMI: Gold	CalmoCobra
"Alibi"	2025	39	—		CalmoCobra
"Bella madonnina"	2025	46	—		CalmoCobra
"Miss Oklahoma" (with Davide Simonetta and Paolo Santo)	2025	—	—		Non-album singles
"Pugili impazziti" (with Baustelle)	2025	—	—		Non-album singles
"Buonanotte anche stanotte"	2026	65	—		Non-album singles
"—" denotes a single that did not chart or was not released.

=== As featured artist ===
List of singles and album name
Title	Year	Album
"Sognami" (Biagio Antonacci featuring Tananai and Don Joe)	2023	L'inizio

== Other charted songs ==
List of other charted songs, with selected chart positions, showing year released and album name
Title	Year	Peak chart positions	Album
Title	Year	ITA	Album
"Quelli come noi"	2022	94	Rave, eclissi

== Guest appearances ==
List of non-single appearances on compilation albums or other artists' albums, with album name
Title	Year	Peak chart positions	Album
Title	Year	ITA	Album
"Qualcosa di grande" (Mameli featuring Vipra and Tananai)	2020	—	Non-album single
"Le madri degli altri" (Fedez featuring Tananai)	2021	—	Disumano
"Il boom (Tananai Remix)" (Jovanotti featuring Tananai)	2021	—	Il boom (i remix)
"Essere me" (VillaBanks featuring Tananai)	2022	—	Sex Festival
"Scialla" (Thasup featuring Tananai)	2022	22	Carattere speciale
"Domani ti chiamo" (Sick Luke featuring Tananai and Bnkr44)	2022	—	X2 (Deluxe)
"—" denotes a song that did not chart or was not released.

== Author, composer and producer for other artists ==
List of selected songs co-written by Tananai
Title	Year	Artist	Album
"Everyday"	2023	Takagi & Ketra feat. Shiva, Anna and Geolier	Non-album single
"L'inverno"	2023	Angelica Bove	X Factor Mixtape 2023
"Rey mysterio"	2024	Lil Busso and Paolo Santo	Non-album single
"Si mette male"	2024	Alessandra Amoroso	Io non sarei
"Piangere a 90"	2025	Blanco	Non-album single
