= Propaganda (song) =

Single by Fabri Fibra featuring Colapesce and Dimartino

from the album Caos
- Released: 18 March 2022
- Recorded: 2022
- Length: 3:34
- Label: Epic
- Songwriters: Fabrizio Tarducci; Davide Petrella; Zef; Marz
- Producers: Zef; Marz

Fabri Fibra singles chronology
"Il mio amico" (2021)	"Propaganda" (2022)	"Sfiga" (2022)

Colapesce singles chronology
"Toy Boy" (2021)	"Propaganda" (2022)	"Non chiamarmi mai" (2022)

Dimartino singles chronology
"Toy Boy" (2021)	"Propaganda" (2022)	"Non chiamarmi mai" (2022)

Music video
- "Propaganda" on YouTube

"Propaganda" is a song by Italian rapper Fabri Fibra, with featured vocals by Colapesce and Dimartino. It was released on 18 March 2022 by Epic Records as the lead single from Fibra's tenth studio album Caos.

The song was written by the artist with Davide Petrella and produced by Zef and Marz.

== Music video ==
A music video for "Propaganda", directed by Cosimo Alemà, was released onto YouTube on the same day. It was shot in Vercelli, most notably at the Basilica di Sant'Andrea and the Camera di Commercio building.

== Charts ==
Weekly chart performance for "Propaganda"
Chart (2023)	Peak position
Italy (FIMI)	10
Italy Airplay (EarOne)	1

== Certifications ==
Region	Certification	Certified units/sales
Italy (FIMI)	2× Platinum	200,000^{‡}
^{‡} Sales+streaming figures based on certification alone.
