= Supereroi (disambiguation) =

Supereroi ("Superheroes" in Italian) may refer to:

- Superheroes (film), a 2021 film by Paolo Genovese
- "Supereroi" (Mr. Rain song), a 2023 single by Mr. Rain
- "Supereroi" (Ultimo song), a 2021 single by Ultimo
- "Supereroi", a 2018 single by Giorgio Vanni
