= Blocco 181 =

- Genre: Crime drama
- Starring: Laura Osma; Alessandro Piavani; Andrea Dodero; Salmo; Alessandro Tedeschi; Alessio Praticò; Juan Cely Delgado; Sergio Andrade Saavedra; Anna Manuelli
- Country of origin: Italy
- Original language: Italian
- No. of seasons: 2
- No. of episodes: 16

Production
- Executive producer: Giuseppe Capotondi
- Producer: Giuseppe Capotondi
- Production location: Italy
- Camera setup: Single-camera
- Running time: 50 min
- Production companies: Sky Studios; Red Joint Film; Tapeless Film

Original release
- Network: Sky Atlantic
- Release: 20 May 2022 – present

Block 181 (Italian: Blocco 181) is an Italian crime drama television series that premiered on 20 May 2022 on Sky Atlantic. The series is set in Milan and follows a ménage à trois between two men and a woman.

The second season, advertised as Gangs of Milano - Le nuove storie del Blocco, premiered on 21 March 2025.

== Plot ==
The peripheral area of Block 181 is controlled by the boys of the Block, led by the boss, Nicola Rizzo. The arrival of the Misa's pandilleros upsets the balance and leads to a clash for supremacy in the territory in an increasingly growing rivalry. Within this rivalry, a love is born that unites the factions: Bea, the Misa boss's sister, Ludo, one of the couriers of cocaine lord Lorenzo, and Mahdi, Rizzo's nephew. Thanks to this relationship, the three carve out their place in the neighbourhood criminal system.

== Cast and characters ==
- Laura Osma as Bea: The most important woman in the Misa, Ricardo's sister.
- Alessandro Piavani as Ludovico "Ludo" Bellini: Works as a courier for Lorenzo Curzi, delivering cocaine, before starting on his own with Bea and Mahdi.
- Andrea Dodero as Mahdi: Rizzo's nephew. He collects the rent for the apartments in Block 181.
- Salmo as Snake: Lorenzo Curzi's right-hand man.
- Alessandro Tedeschi as Lorenzo Curzi: He is the area's cocaine kingpin, who also grew up in Block 181.
- Alessio Praticò as Nicola Rizzo (season 1), the boss of Block 181 gang and has always been Lorenzo Curzi's friend and partner.
- Juan Cely Delgado as Ricardo: the Misa's boss and Bea's brother.
- Sergio Andrade Saavedra as Victor: Ricardo's right-hand man and the boss while Ricardo's in jail.
- Anna Manuelli as Isabella "Isa" Bellini: Ludo's sister.

== Release ==
The series was announced on 3 February 2022, during the premiere of the eighth episode of the eleventh season of MasterChef Italia, where the contestants took part in an outdoor test on the set of Blocco 181. On 28 March 2022, Sky released the first teaser trailer and announced that it would debut the following May on Sky Atlantic. A second trailer, releasead on 27 April 2022, revealed the release date, May 20, 2022.

The second season of the series, advertised as Gangs of Milano - Le nuove storie del blocco, was broadcast from 21 March 2025 on Sky Atlantic Italy. The sixth episode, centered on the character of Snake, was previewed on 2 December 2024 at the Cinema Arlecchino in Milan as part of the annual, Noir in Festival.
