= Sanremo Music Festival 2023 =

Italian song contest (73rd edition)

Dates and venue
- Semi-final 1: 7 February 2023
- Semi-final 2: 8 February 2023
- Semi-final 3: 9 February 2023
- Semi-final 4: 10 February 2023
- Final: 11 February 2023
- Venue: Teatro Ariston; Sanremo, Italy

Production
- Broadcaster: Radiotelevisione italiana (RAI)
- Director: Stefano Vicario
- Musical director: Leonardo De Amicis
- Artistic director: Amadeus
- Presenters: Amadeus and Gianni Morandi with Chiara Ferragni (first and fifth night) Francesca Fagnani (second night) Paola Egonu (third night) Chiara Francini (fourth night)

Vote
- Voting system: Televote, press jury and demoscopic jury

Big Artists section
- Number of entries: 28
- Winner: "Due vite" Marco Mengoni

The Sanremo Music Festival 2023 (Italian: Festival di Sanremo 2023), officially the 73rd Italian Song Festival (73º Festival della canzone italiana), was the 73rd edition of the annual Sanremo Music Festival, a television song contest held in the Teatro Ariston of Sanremo, organised and broadcast by Radiotelevisione italiana (RAI). The show was held between 7 and 11 February 2023, and was presented for the fourth time in a row by Amadeus, who also served as the artistic director for the competition, with Gianni Morandi co-hosting.

The festival was won by Marco Mengoni with "Due vite", earning him the right to represent Italy in the Eurovision Song Contest 2023; Mengoni had previously won Sanremo in 2013 and had represented Italy in that year's Eurovision.

== Format ==
The 2023 edition of the Sanremo Music Festival took place at the Teatro Ariston in Sanremo, Liguria, organized by the Italian public broadcaster RAI. The artistic director and the presenter for the competition was Amadeus, for the fourth consecutive year.

=== Presenters ===
On 24 March 2022, one month after the final of the 2022 edition, RAI officially confirmed Amadeus as the presenter of the 73rd edition of the Sanremo Music Festival. Together with Amadeus, Gianni Morandi served as co-host in all five nights of the festival. Alongside Amadeus and Morandi, four co-hosts alternated during the five evenings: Chiara Ferragni (first night and final), Francesca Fagnani (second night), Paola Egonu (third night) and Chiara Francini (fourth night).

=== Voting ===
Voting occurred through the combination of three methods:

- Public televoting, carried out via landline, mobile phone, the contest's official mobile app, and online voting.
- Jury of the press room, TV, radio and web.
- Demoscopic jury, composed by 1000 music fans who vote from their homes via an electronic voting system managed by Ipsos.

Their voting was articulated as follows:

- First two nights: half of the entrants were judged by three separate panels from the jury of the press room, TV, radio and web.
- Third night: all of the entrants were judged through a 50/50 split system by means of televoting and the demoscopic jury. The results were combined with those of the previous nights.
- Fourth night: the same systems used on the first three nights were put in place.
- Fifth night: the entrants were judged by televoting alone, to be added up to the results obtained that far; ultimately, a final voting round (again a sum of televoting and the two juries) was held among the top 5, which determined the winner.

== Selections ==
=== Sanremo Giovani 2022 ===
For the second time in a row, the Newcomers' section was not included in the Festival, but a similar selection was held to decree the six places reserved in the Big Artist section. The artists competing in the new format were selected through two separate contests: Standard section and Area Sanremo.

==== Standard selection ====
On 26 October 2022, the RAI commission for Sanremo Music Festival 2022 announced a list of 714 acts, but only 43 artists coming from all Italian regions – excluding Basilicata and Valle d'Aosta – and from abroad were selected in the first phase.

On 5 November 2022, the RAI commission announced the eight finalists.

- Gianmaria – "La città che odi"
- Giuse the Lizia – "Sincera"
- Maninni – "Mille porte"
- Mida – "Malditè"
- Olly – "L'anima balla"
- Sethu – "Sottoterra"
- Shari – "Sotto voce"
- Will – "Le cose più importanti"

==== Area Sanremo ====
After the auditions, a RAI commission – composed by Amadeus, Federica Lentini, Massimo Martelli and Leonardo de Amicis – identified 4 finalists for the competition among the 549 acts:

- Colla Zio – "Asfalto"
- Fiat 131 – "Pupille"
- Noor – "Tua Amelie"
- Romeo & Drill – "Giorno di scuola"

==== Final ====
On 16 December 2022, the twelve finalists performed their songs on Sanremo Giovani 2022, broadcast on Rai 1 and presented by Amadeus. Gianmaria, Will, Olly, Colla Zio, Shari and Sethu will participate in Sanremo 2023 with a new entry.

Enters Sanremo 2023

R/O	Artist	Song
1	Gianmaria	"La città che odi"
2	Noor	"Tua Amelie"
3	Will	"Le cose più importanti"
4	Olly	"L'anima balla"
5	Maninni	"Mille porte"
6	Colla Zio	"Asfalto"
7	Fiat 131	"Pupille"
8	Mida	"Malditè"
9	Shari	"Sotto voce"
10	Giuse the Lizia	"Sincera"
11	Romeo & Drill	"Giorno di scuola"
12	Sethu	"Sottoterra"

=== Big Artists ===
For the second year in a row, the traditional Big Artists section of the contest was merged with the Newcomers' section, and saw the participation of 28 artists, 22 being selected among established artists and 6 qualifying from Sanremo Giovani. The former 22, selected from over 300 submissions received, were revealed on 4 December 2022, and also attended the night of Sanremo Giovani on 16 December, where their competing songs' titles were also made known.

== Competing entries ==
Competing songs and artists, showing writers, orchestra conductor and results achieved
Artist	Song	Songwriter(s)	Orchestra conductor	Rank	Sanremo Music Festival Awards
Marco Mengoni	"Due vite"	Davide Petrella; Davide Simonetta; Marco Mengoni	Giovanni Pallotti (nights 1, 3 and 5); Carmelo Patti (night 4)	1	Winner of the "Big Artists" section – Golden Lion; Orchestra's "Giancarlo Bigazzi" Award for the Best Composition
Lazza	"Cenere"	Dario "Dardust" Faini; Davide Petrella; Jacopo "Lazza" Lazzarini	Enzo Campagnoli	2	None
Mr. Rain	"Supereroi"	Federica Abbate; Lorenzo Vizzini Bisaccia; Mattia "Mr. Rain" Balardi	Enrico Melozzi	3	None
Ultimo	"Alba"	Niccolò "Ultimo" Moriconi	Will Medini (nights 1, 3 and 5); Celso Valli (night 4)	4	None
Tananai	"Tango"	Alberto "Tananai" Cotta Ramusino; Alessandro Raina; Davide Simonetta; Paolo Antonacci	Fabio Gurian	5	None
Giorgia	"Parole dette male"	Alberto Bianco; Francesco Roccati; Massimiliano "Big Fish" Dagani; Mario Marco Gianclaudio Fracchiolla	Big Fish	6	None
Madame	"Il bene nel male"	Francesca "Madame" Calearo; Iacopo "Brail" Sinigaglia; Nicolas "Bias" Biasin	Luca Faraone	7	None
Rosa Chemical	"Made in Italy"	Davide Simonetta; Manuel Franco "Rosa Chemical" Rocati; Oscar Inglese; Paolo Antonacci	Fabio Gurian	8	None
Elodie	"Due"	Elodie Di Patrizi; Federica Abbate; Francesco "Katoo" Catitti; Jacope Ettorre	Carolina Bubbico	9	None
Colapesce and Dimartino	"Splash"	Antonio "Dimartino" Di Martino; Lorenzo "Colapesce" Urciullo	Davide Rossi	10	"Mia Martini" Critic's Award; Press room's "Lucio Dalla" Award
Modà	"Lasciami"	Enrico "Kikko" Palmosi; Francesco "Kekko" Silvestre	Adriano Pennino	11	None
Gianluca Grignani	"Quando ti manca il fiato"	Enrico Melozzi; Gianluca Grignani	Enrico Melozzi (nights 1, 3 and 5); Peppe Vessicchio (night 4)	12	None
Coma_Cose	"L'addio"	Carlo Frigerio; Fabio Dalè; Fausto Zanardelli; Francesca "California" Mesiano	Vittorio Cosma	13	Music commission's "Sergio Bardotti" Award for the Best Lyrics; Lunezia Award
Ariete	"Mare di guai"	Arianna "Ariete" Del Giaccio; Dario "Dardust" Faini; Edoardo "Calcutta" D'Erme; Vincenzo Centrella	Alberto Cipolla	14	None
LDA	"Se poi domani"	Alessandro Caiazza; Luca "LDA" D'Alessio	Francesco D'Alessio (nights 2, 3 and 5); Adriano Pennino (night 4)	15	None
Articolo 31	"Un bel viaggio"	Alessandro "J-Ax" Aleotti; Antonio Colangelo; Daniele Silvestri; Federica Abbate; Luca Paolo "Grido" Aleotti; Wladimiro "Wlady" Perrini	Valeriano Chiaravalle (nights 2, 3 and 5); Franco Godi (night 4)	16	None
Paola e Chiara	"Furore"	Alessandro La Cava; Chiara Iezzi; Paola Iezzi; Eugenio Maimone; Federico "Merk" Mercuri; Giordano "Kremont" Cremona; Jacopo Ettore; Leonardo Grillotti	Federico Mercuri (nights 2, 3 and 5); Luca Faraone (night 4)	17	None
Leo Gassmann	"Terzo cuore"	Giorgio Pesenti; Leonardo "Leo" Gassmann; Marco Paganelli; Riccardo Zanotti	Simone Bertolotti (nights 1, 3 and 5); Fernando Lopez (night 4)	18	None
Mara Sattei	"Duemilaminuti"	Damiano David; Davide "Thasup" Mattei; Enrico Brun	Carmelo Patti	19	"CoReCom" Award
Colla Zio	"Non mi va"	Andrea "Armo" Arminio; Andrea "Mala" Malatesta; Francesco "Glampo" Lamperti; Giorgio Pesenti; Tommaso "Berna" Bernasconi; Tommaso "Petta" Manzoni	Carmelo Patti	20	NuovoIMAIE "Enzo Jannacci" Award for the Best Interpretation
I Cugini di Campagna	"Lettera 22"	Fabio Gargiulo; Dario Mangiaracina; Veronica Lucchesi	Fabio Gargiulo	21	None
Gianmaria	"Mostro"	Antonio Filippelli; Gianmarco Manilardi; Gianmaria Volpato; Vincenzo Centrella; Vito Petrozzino	Daniel Bestonzo	22	None
Levante	"Vivo"	Claudia "Levante" Lagona	Daniel Bestonzo	23	None
Olly	"Polvere"	Emanuele Lovito, Federico "Olly" Olivieri; Julien "JVLI" Boverod	Alberto Cipolla	24	None
Anna Oxa	"Sali (Canto dell'anima)"	Anna Hoxha; Fiorenzo "Fio" Zanotti; Francesco Bianconi; Giuseppe "Kaballà" Rinaldi	Loris Ceroni	25	None
Will	"Stupido"	Andrea Pugliese; Simone Cremonini; William "Will" Busetti	Valeriano Chiaravalle	26	None
Shari	"Egoista"	Luciano Fenudi; Maurizio "Salmo" Pisciottu; Riccardo Puddu; Shari Noioso	Carmine Iuvone	27	None
Sethu	"Cause perse"	Giorgio "Jiz" De Lauri; Marco "Sethu" De Lauri	Enrico Melozzi	28	None

== Shows ==
=== First night ===
The first fourteen competing artists each performed their song.

First night: 7 February 2023
R/O	Artist	Song	Press jury ranking			
R/O	Artist	Song	Panel 1 (press and TV)	Panel 2 (radio)	Panel 3 (web)	Total ranking
1	Anna Oxa	"Sali (Canto dell'anima)"	14	14	14	14
2	Gianmaria	"Mostro"	13	13	11	12
3	Mr. Rain	"Supereroi"	10	8	7	9
4	Marco Mengoni	"Due vite"	1	1	1	1
5	Ariete	"Mare di guai"	11	10	12	11
6	Ultimo	"Alba"	4	7	10	4
7	Coma_Cose	"L'addio"	2	5	2	3
8	Elodie	"Due"	3	2	3	2
9	Leo Gassmann	"Terzo cuore"	6	4	5	5
10	I Cugini di Campagna	"Lettera 22"	5	8	9	8
11	Gianluca Grignani	"Quando ti manca il fiato"	7	13	8	10
12	Olly	"Polvere"	12	12	13	13
13	Colla Zio	"Non mi va"	8	6	6	7
14	Mara Sattei	"Duemilaminuti"	9	3	4	6

=== Second night ===
The remaining fourteen artists each performed their song.

Second night: 8 February 2023
R/O	Artist	Song	Press jury ranking			
R/O	Artist	Song	Panel 1 (press and TV)	Panel 2 (radio)	Panel 3 (web)	Total ranking
1	Will	"Stupido"	12	10	13	12
2	Modà	"Lasciami"	8	12	10	10
3	Sethu	"Cause perse"	13	14	12	14
4	Articolo 31	"Un bel viaggio"	7	9	9	9
5	Lazza	"Cenere"	6	4	3	4
6	Giorgia	"Parole dette male"	4	3	7	5
7	Colapesce and Dimartino	"Splash"	1	5	1	1
8	Shari	"Egoista"	14	13	14	13
9	Madame	"Il bene nel male"	2	1	2	2
10	Levante	"Vivo"	9	8	9	8
11	Tananai	"Tango"	3	2	4	3
12	Rosa Chemical	"Made in Italy"	5	6	5	6
13	LDA	"Se poi domani"	11	11	11	11
14	Paola e Chiara	"Furore"	10	7	6	7

=== Third night ===
All of the twenty-eight artists performed their songs once again.

Third night: 9 February 2023
R/O	Artist	Song	Provisional general ranking	Night rankings			Updated general ranking
R/O	Artist	Song	Provisional general ranking	Demoscopic jury	Televote	Total ranking	Updated general ranking
1	Paola e Chiara	"Furore"	14	16	16	17	14
2	Mara Sattei	"Duemilaminuti"	12	14	19	18	18
3	Rosa Chemical	"Made in Italy"	9	13	6	7	7
4	Gianluca Grignani	"Quando ti manca il fiato"	19	17	8	8	12
5	Levante	"Vivo"	16	18	24	23	21
6	Tananai	"Tango"	4	8	5	5	5
7	Lazza	"Cenere"	7	9	4	4	4
8	LDA	"Se poi domani"	24	22	9	13	15
9	Madame	"Il bene nel male"	3	7	7	6	6
10	Ultimo	"Alba"	10	11	1	1	2
11	Elodie	"Due"	5	5	13	10	9
12	Mr. Rain	"Supereroi"	17	2	3	3	3
13	Giorgia	"Parole dette male"	8	6	12	9	10
14	Colla Zio	"Non mi va"	13	19	22	21	20
15	Marco Mengoni	"Due vite"	1	1	2	2	1
16	Colapesce and Dimartino	"Splash"	2	3	14	11	8
17	Coma_Cose	"L'addio"	6	4	15	12	11
18	Leo Gassmann	"Terzo cuore"	11	10	23	19	19
19	I Cugini di Campagna	"Lettera 22"	15	21	25	25	22
20	Olly	"Polvere"	23	24	21	24	24
21	Anna Oxa	"Sali (Canto dell'anima)"	26	26	18	20	25
22	Articolo 31	"Un bel viaggio"	18	12	17	16	17
23	Ariete	"Mare di guai"	20	20	11	15	16
24	Sethu	"Cause perse"	28	28	27	28	28
25	Shari	"Egoista"	27	27	28	27	27
26	Gianmaria	"Mostro"	22	23	20	22	23
27	Modà	"Lasciami"	21	15	10	14	13
28	Will	"Stupido"	25	25	26	26	26

=== Fourth night ===
The artists each performed a cover of a song from the '60s, '70s, '80s, '90s, or '00s, duetting with a guest performer.

Fourth night: 10 February 2023
R/O	Artist	Guest artist	Song	Night rankings				Updated general ranking
R/O	Artist	Guest artist	Song	Press jury	Demoscopic jury	Televote	Total ranking	Updated general ranking
1	Ariete	Sangiovanni	"Centro di gravità permanente"	28	28	7	17	18
2	Will	Michele Zarrillo	"Cinque giorni"	26	23	18	25	26
3	Elodie	BigMama	"American Woman"	3	4	12	7	9
4	Olly	Lorella Cuccarini	"La notte vola"	20	18	17	20	24
5	Ultimo	Eros Ramazzotti	Eros Ramazzotti medley (Note: "Adesso tu", "Più bella cosa" and "Un'emozione per sempre")	12	13	2	2	2
6	Lazza	Emma Marrone and Laura Marzadori	"La fine"	4	3	3	3	3
7	Tananai	Don Joe and Biagio Antonacci	"Vorrei cantare come Biagio" and "Sognami"	5	5	6	6	6
8	Shari	Salmo	"Hai scelto me" and "Diavolo in me"	27	26	24	28	27
9	Gianluca Grignani	Arisa	"Destinazione Paradiso"	9	10	8	8	11
10	Leo Gassmann	Edoardo Bennato and Quartetto Flegreo	Edoardo Bennato medley (Note: "A cosa serve la guerra", "L'isola che non c'è" and "Il rock di Capitan Uncino")	11	8	15	13	16
11	Articolo 31	Fedez	Articolo 31 medley (Note: "L'italiano medio", "Domani smetto", "Spirale ovale", "Gente che spera", "Volume", "La fidanzata", "Ohi Maria", "Il funkytarro", "Tranqi Funky", and "Un urlo")	16	6	10	9	14
12	Giorgia	Elisa	"Luce (Tramonti a nord est)" and "Di sole e d'azzurro"	1	1	4	4	5
13	Colapesce & Dimartino	Carla Bruni	"Azzurro"	6	20	19	15	10
14	I Cugini di Campagna	Paolo Vallesi	"La forza della vita" and "Anima mia"	24	25	22	24	22
15	Marco Mengoni	The Kingdom Choir	"Let It Be"	2	2	1	1	1
16	Gianmaria	Manuel Agnelli	"Quello che non c'è"	14	22	16	16	21
17	Mr. Rain	Fasma	"Qualcosa di grande"	25	11	5	5	4
18	Madame	Izi	"Via del Campo"	8	12	11	11	7
19	Coma_Cose	Baustelle	"Sarà perché ti amo"	17	7	23	18	12
20	Rosa Chemical	Rose Villain	"America"	7	21	13	12	8
21	Modà	Le Vibrazioni	"Vieni da me"	18	14	9	10	13
22	Levante	Renzo Rubino	"Vivere"	23	19	27	26	23
23	Anna Oxa	Iljard Shaba	"Un'emozione da poco"	21	24	20	23	25
24	Sethu	Bnkr44	"Charlie fa surf"	22	27	28	27	28
25	LDA	Alex Britti	"Oggi sono io"	13	16	14	14	15
26	Mara Sattei	Noemi	"L'amour toujours"	19	9	26	22	19
27	Paola e Chiara	Merk & Kremont	Paola e Chiara medley (Note: "Festival", "Viva el amor!", "Amici come prima" and "Vamos a bailar (Esta vida nueva)"; The performance was accompanied by instrumentals of "Hung Up", "Can't Get You Out of My Head" and "I Will Survive")	15	15	21	19	17
28	Colla Zio	Ditonellapiaga	"Salirò"	10	17	25	21	20

=== Fifth night – Final ===
All of the artists performed their songs one final time, with the top five reprising their performances before moving on to the final round of voting.

Advanced to superfinals

Fifth night: 11 February 2023 – First round
R/O	Artist	Song	Televote		Final general ranking
R/O	Artist	Song	%	Place	Final general ranking
1	Elodie	"Due"	2.34%	10	9
2	Colla Zio	"Non mi va"	0.53%	21	20
3	Mara Sattei	"Duemilaminuti"	0.66%	18	19
4	Tananai	"Tango"	6.30%	5	5
5	Colapesce & Dimartino	"Splash"	2.01%	11	10
6	Giorgia	"Parole dette male"	2.44%	9	6
7	Modà	"Lasciami"	2.70%	8	11
8	Ultimo	"Alba"	15.67%	2	2
9	Lazza	"Cenere"	13.88%	4	3
10	Marco Mengoni	"Due vite"	21.19%	1	1
11	Rosa Chemical	"Made in Italy"	3.68%	7	8
12	I Cugini di Campagna	"Lettera 22"	0.74%	16	21
13	Madame	"Il bene nel male"	3.94%	6	7
14	Ariete	"Mare di guai"	1.71%	12	14
15	Mr. Rain	"Supereroi"	14.80%	3	4
16	Paola e Chiara	"Furore"	0.62%	19	17
17	Levante	"Vivo"	0.42%	24	23
18	LDA	"Se poi domani"	1.11%	13	15
19	Coma_Cose	"L'addio"	0.94%	15	13
20	Olly	"Polvere"	0.42%	25	24
21	Articolo 31	"Un bel viaggio"	0.71%	17	16
22	Will	"Stupido"	0.19%	26	26
23	Leo Gassmann	"Terzo cuore"	0.49%	23	18
24	Gianmaria	"Mostro"	0.59%	20	22
25	Anna Oxa	"Sali (Canto dell'anima)"	0.52%	22	25
26	Shari	"Egoista"	0.09%	28	27
27	Gianluca Grignani	"Quando ti manca il fiato"	1.07%	14	12
28	Sethu	"Cause perse"	0.11%	27	28

Fifth night: 11 February 2023 – Second round (Superfinal)
R/O	Artist	Song	Rankings				Place
R/O	Artist	Song	Press jury	Demoscopic jury	Televote	Total	Place
1	Ultimo	"Alba"	5	4	20.39%	12.25%	4
2	Tananai	"Tango"	3	5	11.15%	11.15%	5
3	Lazza	"Cenere"	2	3	18.28%	16.64%	2
4	Marco Mengoni	"Due vite"	1	1	32.31%	45.53%	1
5	Mr. Rain	"Supereroi"	4	2	17.87%	14.43%	3

== Special guests ==
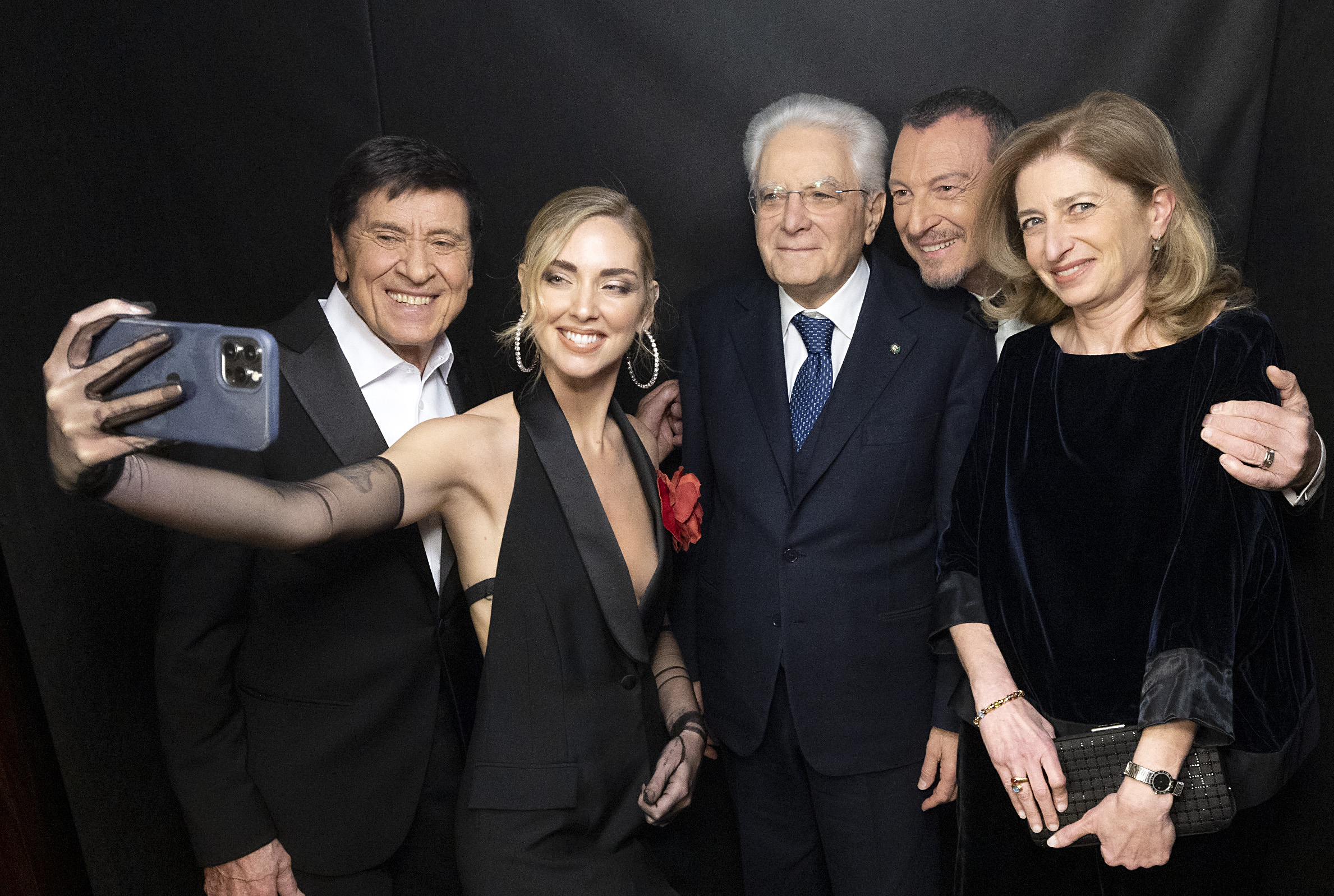
Gianni Morandi, Chiara Ferragni and Amadeus taking a selfie with president of Italy Sergio Mattarella and his daughter Laura Mattarella

The special guests of Sanremo Music Festival 2023 included:

- Singers / musicians: Achille Lauro, Al Bano, Annalisa, Antytila, Black Eyed Peas, Blanco, Depeche Mode, Fedez, Francesco Renga, Gino Paoli, Guè, Italian Air Force Band, J-Ax, La Rappresentante di Lista, Mahmood, Måneskin, Massimo Ranieri, Nek, Ornella Vanoni, Peppino di Capri, Piero Pelù, Pooh, Salmo, Sangiovanni, Takagi & Ketra, Tom Morello
- Actors / comedians / directors / models: Alessandro Siani, Alessia Marcuzzi, Andrea Delogu, Angelo Duro, Drusilla Foer, Elena Sofia Ricci, Fabrizio Biggio, Fiorello, Francesco Arca, Gli Autogol, Jody Cecchetto, Lillo, Luisa Ranieri, Mariasole Pollio, Mario Di Leva, Rocío Muñoz Morales, Roberto Benigni, cast of The Sea Beyond: Carolina Crescentini, Massimiliano Caiazzo, Matteo Paolillo, Nicolas Maupas, Valentina Romani, Giacomo Giorgio, Ar Tem, Domenico Cuomo, Clotilde Esposito, Maria Esposito and Kyshan Wilson
- Sports people: Antonio Fuoco, Charles Leclerc, Francesca Lollobrigida
- Other persons or notable figures: National Association D.i.Re – Donne in rete contro la violenza, Pegah Moshir Pour, Sergio and Laura Mattarella, Volodymyr Zelenskyy (via written text)

== Broadcast and ratings ==
=== Local broadcast ===
Rai 1 and Rai Radio 2 brought the official broadcasts of the festival in Italy. The five evenings were also streamed online via the broadcaster's official website RaiPlay, which made it available in all member countries of the European Broadcasting Union, since the festival is broadcast on the Eurovision network.

Broadcasters of the Sanremo Music Festival 2022
Country	Show(s)	Broadcaster(s)	Commentator(s)	Ref(s)
Italy	All shows	Rai 1, Rai 4K	No commentary	
Italy	All shows	Rai Radio 2	Ema Stokholma and Gino Castaldo	
Italy	All shows	RaiPlay, RaiPlay Sound	No commentary	
Italy	All shows	Rai Italia (outside Italy)	No commentary	
Albania	All shows	RTSH Muzikë, RTSH Tirana	No commentary	
Albania	Final	RTSH 1	Andri Xhahu and Blerina Shehu	
Montenegro	All shows	TVCG 2	Nebojsa Sofranac	
Serbia	Nights 1–4	RTS2	No commentary	
Serbia	Final	RTS3	No commentary	
United Kingdom	Final	GlitterBeam	Eugenio Ceriello and Michael Walton-Dalzell	

=== Ratings ===
Live show	Timeslot (UTC+1)	Date	1st time (9:00 pm – 0:00 am)		2nd time (0:00 am – 1:30 am)		Overall audience		Ref(s)
Live show	Timeslot (UTC+1)	Date	Viewers	Share (%)	Viewers	Share (%)	Viewers	Share (%)	Ref(s)
1st	9:00 pm	7 February	14,170,000	61.7	6,271,000	64.8	10,757,000	62.4	
2nd	9:00 pm	8 February	14,087,000	61.1	6,281,000	65.7	10,545,000	62.3	
3rd	9:00 pm	9 February	13,341,000	57.2	5,584,000	58.4	9,240,000	57.6	
4th	9:00 pm	10 February	15,046,000	65.2	7,041,000	69.7	11,121,000	66.5	
5th	9:00 pm	11 February	14,423,000	62.70	9,490,000	73.65	12,256,000	66.0	

== See also ==
- Italy in the Eurovision Song Contest 2023
