= Ariete (singer) =

Italian singer-songwriter

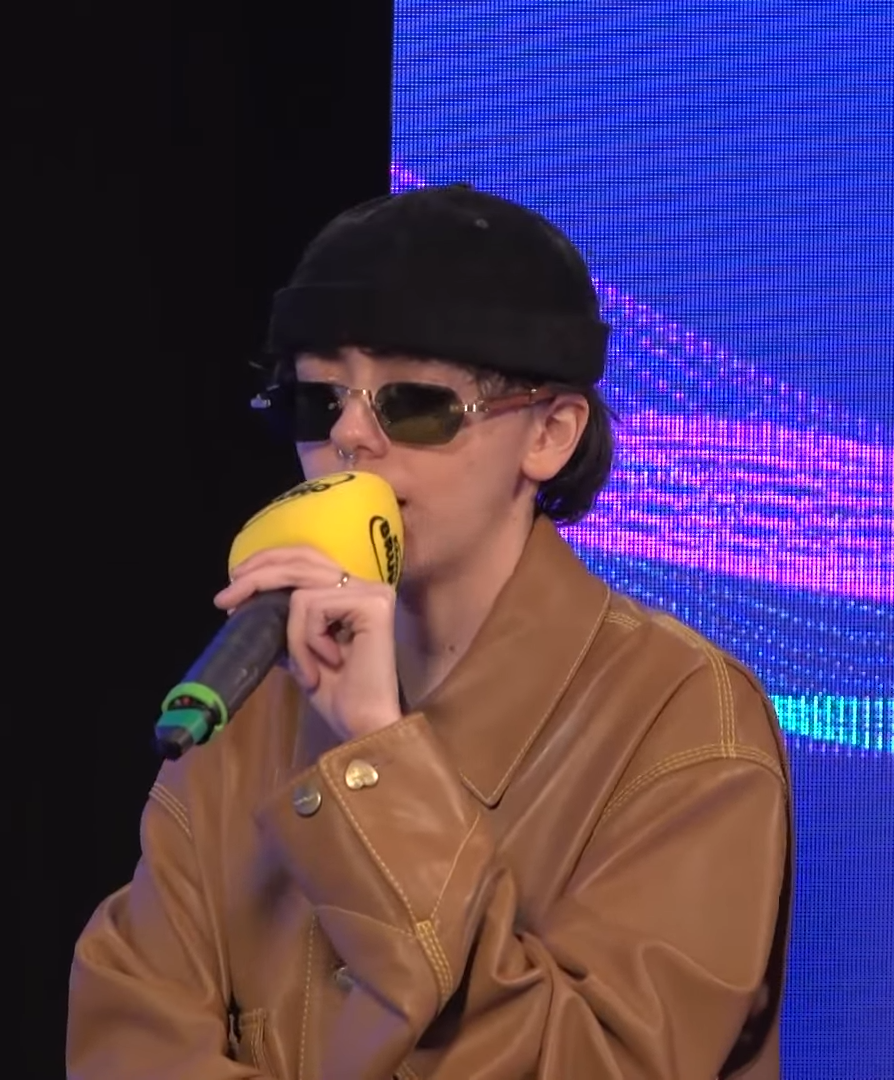
- Ariete in 2023

Background information
- Born: Arianna Del Giaccio; 27 March 2002 (age 24); Anzio, Lazio, Italy
- Genres: Indie pop; emo-pop
- Occupations: Singer; songwriter
- Years active: 2019–present
- Labels: Bomba Dischi; Universal Music Italy

Arianna Del Giaccio (born 27 March 2002), known professionally as Ariete, is an Italian singer–songwriter.

== Early life and career ==
Del Giaccio was born in Anzio. At age eight, she started playing the guitar and after a few years, the piano. She then began writing and composing her first pieces. In 2019, she participated in the thirteenth season of the Italian talent show X Factor, qualifying for the first stages of selection, but being eliminated in the "Bootcamps". In August 2019, she released her first single, "Quel bar", followed by the single, "01/12", released in December of the same year.

After her first two independent releases, Del Giaccio was contacted by Italian producer Andrea Bomba, who invited her to open the musical event Rock in Roma. In 2020, she signed a recording contract with the label Bomba Dischi, with whom she released her debut EP, Spazio. It has been certified gold. On September 16, she released the single "Tatuaggi" in collaboration with the Italian music group Psicologi, certified platinum. In November 2020, she released her second EP, 18 Anni, also certified gold. In 2021, she featured in multiple songs by various artists, such as Alfa, Novelo, Tauro Boys, Bnkr44, and Rkomi, earning platinum with the latter for the song "Diecimilavoci". On 3 May, she released the single "L'ultima notte", also used in a commercial for Algida and certified double platinum.

On 25 February 2022, she released her first studio album, Specchio, containing eleven tracks, being later certified gold. The album debuted at number 4 on FIMI's album chart. In support of the release, she embarked on the Specchio Tour. In June 2022, she released her single "Tutto (con te)". On 4 December 2022, Ariete's participation in the Sanremo Music Festival 2023 with "Mare di guai" was announced.

== Personal life ==
Ariete is openly bisexual and has expressed same-sex love as a theme in some of her songs, also doing activism on social platforms and during her concerts.

== Discography ==
=== Studio albums ===
List of studio albums with album details and chart positions
Title	Album details	Peak chart positions
Title	Album details	ITA
Specchio	Released: 25 February 2022; Label: Bomba Dischi; Format: CD, digital download, streaming	4
La notte	Released: 22 September 2023; Label: Bomba Dischi; Format: CD, digital download, streaming	3
Tutti tornano a casa	Released: 1 October 2026; Label: Bomba Dischi; Format: CD, digital download, streaming	6

=== Compilation albums ===
List of compilation albums with album details
Title	Album details
Ariete	Released: 26 April 2022; Label: Bomba Dischi; Format: Digital download, streaming

=== Extended plays ===
List of EPs, with selected details and chart positions
Title	Details	Peak chart positions
Title	Details	ITA
Spazio	Released: 14 May 2020; Label: Bomba Dischi; Format: Digital download, streaming	90
18 anni	Released: 3 December 2020; Label: Bomba Dischi; Format: Digital download, streaming	64

=== Singles ===
==== As lead artist ====
List of singles as lead artist, with chart positions, showing year released and album name
Title	Year	Peak chart positions	Certifications	Album
Title	Year	ITA	Certifications	Album
"Quel bar"	2019	—		Non-album singles
"01/12"	2019	—		Non-album singles
"Riposa in pace" (featuring Drast)	2020	—		Non-album singles
"Venerdì"	2020	—		18 anni
"18 anni"	2020	—	FIMI: Gold	18 anni
"L'ultima notte"	2021	12	FIMI: 3× Platinum	Non-album single
"L"	2021	50	FIMI: Gold	Specchio
"Club"	2021	87		Specchio
"Castelli di lenzuola"	2022	66	FIMI: Gold	Specchio
"Tutto (con te)"	2022	—		Non-album single
"Mare di guai"	2023	13	FIMI: Platinum	La notte
"Un'altra ora"	2023	—		La notte
"Rumore"	2023	89		La notte
"Quattro inverni"	2024	—		La notte
"Ossa rotte"	2024	—		Non-album singles
"Che bella vita" (featuring Angelina Mango)	2026	85		Non-album singles
"—" denotes singles that did not chart or were not released.

==== As featured artist ====
List of singles as featured artist, with chart positions, album name and certifications
Title	Year	Peak chart positions	Certifications	Album
Title	Year	ITA	Certifications	Album
"Tatuaggi" (Psicologi featuring Ariete)	2020	45	FIMI: Platinum	Millennium Bug
"Aries" (Sir Prodige featuring Ariete)	2020	—		Non-album single
"Capelli blu" (Tenth Sky featuring Ariete)	2022	—		Cose stupide
"Umore" (Psicologi featuring Ariete)	2022	83		Trauma
"—" denotes singles that did not chart or were not released.

=== Guest appearances ===
List of non-single appearances on compilation albums or other artists' albums, with album name
Title	Year	Album
"Non la ascoltare" (Alfa featuring Ariete)	2021	Nord
"Tu" (Novelo featuring Ariete)	2021	Caro mostro
"Xelisa2" (Tauro Boys featuring Ariete)	2021	TauroTape3
"Diecimilavoci" (Rkomi featuring Ariete)	2021	Taxi Driver
"Tutte le sere" (Bnkr44 featuring Ariete)	2021	Farsi male a noi va bene
"Il giorno più triste del mondo" (Sick Luke featuring Mecna and Ariete)	2022	X2

== Awards and nominations ==
Award Ceremony	Year	Nominee/Work	Category	Result
Berlin Music Video Awards	2024	Mare di guai	Best Cinematography	Nominated

== Filmography ==
- X Factor (2019)
- Sanremo Music Festival 2023

== Tours ==
- Ariete in Tour (2021)
- Specchio Tour (2022)
