= Lorenzo Vizzini =

Italian lyricist and composer (born 1993)

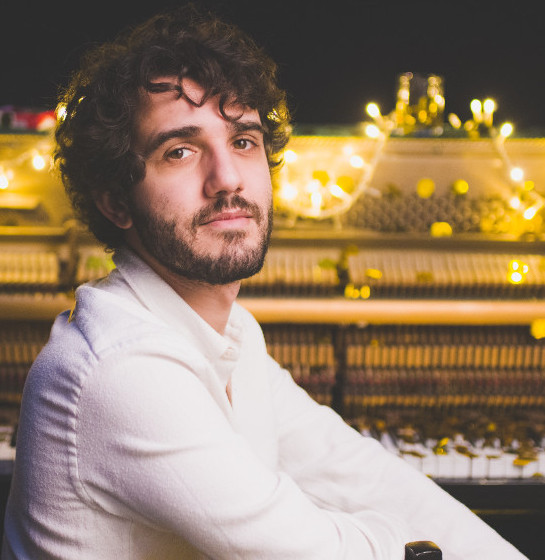
- Vizzini in 2020

Background information
- Born: Lorenzo Vizzini Bisaccia; 1993 (age 32–33); Ragusa, Sicily, Italy
- Occupations: Lyricist; composer; singer-songwriter

Lorenzo Vizzini Bisaccia (born 1993) is an Italian lyricist, composer, record producer and singer-songwriter.

== Life and career ==
Born in Ragusa, the son of the impersonator and comedian Danilo Vizzini, as a child he performed alongside his father in numerous shows and took part in the Canale 5 talent show Bravo Bravissimo, finishing second. At the age of 18, he moved to Milan where he began working as a songwriter. In 2011, he won the Premio Lunezia in the newcomers category. In 2013, he composed 8 of the 13 tracks on Ornella Vanoni's album Meticci. In 2015, he released his first album as a singer-songwriter, Il viaggio.

In 2017, Vizzini collaborated on the composition of the single "200 note", from Laura Pausini's album Simili. In 2019, he took part in the Sanremo Music Festival with two songs, Arisa's "Mi sento bene" and Anna Tatangelo's "Le nostre anime di notte". The same year, he got a Nastro d'argento nomination for best original song with "Toc toc", a song performed by Barbora Bobuľová and composed with Matteo Buzzanca for the film We'll Be Young and Beautiful.

In 2020, Vizzini composed eight tracks for Renato Zero's album Zerosettanta. In 2021, he wrote the lyrics for Marco Mengoni's "Luce", and the same year he began a collaboration with Mr. Rain, penning seven tracks on his album Petrichor; their collaboration continued in 2022 with the album Fragile and in 2023 with "Supereroi", a song that ranked third at the 73rd Sanremo Music Festival.

Vizzini's collaborations include Emma Marrone, Alexia, Francesco Gabbani, Pinguini Tattici Nucleari, Simona Molinari, Raphael Gualazzi, Giovanni Caccamo, Mario Lavezzi, Tricarico, Deborah Iurato, Giordana Angi, Tony Maiello, Sister Cristina, Antonino Spadaccino.

== Discography ==
=== Album ===
- Il viaggio (2015)
- L'aria di casa (2018)
- Suxmario (2021)

=== EP ===
- Riviera (2022)
