= Colapesce (singer) =

Italian singer-songwriter

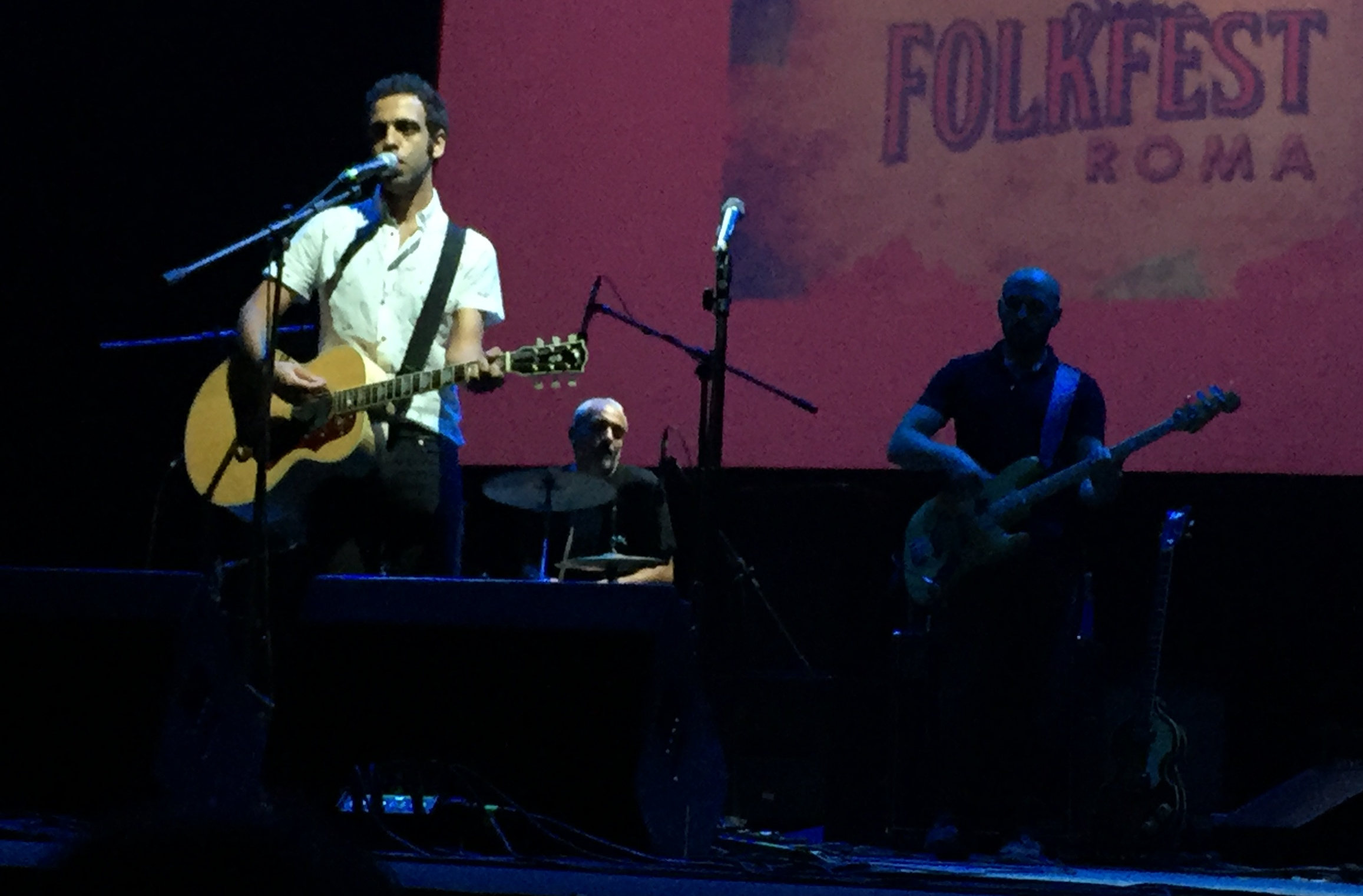
- Colapesce in Rome, 2015

Background information
- Born: Lorenzo Urciullo; 6 September 1983 (age 42); Solarino, Sicily, Italy
- Genres: Indie pop
- Occupations: Singer; songwriter
- Years active: 2005–present

Lorenzo Urciullo (born 6 September 1983), known professionally as Colapesce, is an Italian singer-songwriter.

== Life and career ==
Born in Solarino, Urciullo graduated in Communication Sciences at the University of Catania. He started his career as frontman of the indie rock group Albanopower and part of the musical project Santiago. In 2010 he adopted the stage name Colapesce, inspired by a traditional local myth about a legendary fisherman who holds Sicily on his shoulders to prevent it from sinking, and released the EP Colapesce. His 2012 debut album Un meraviglioso declino included duets with Roy Paci and Meg from 99 Posse, received critical acclaim and got him a Targa Tenco for best debut work.

In 2015 Colapesce released his second album Egomostro, and made his debut as a comics writer with the graphic novel La distanza, illustrated by Alessandro Baronciani. Active as a songwriter for other artists including Luca Carboni, Irene Grandi, Malika Ayane, Emma Marrone, Samuel and Levante, he often collaborated with singer-songwriter Dimartino, with whom in 2020 he started a duo musical project with the album I mortali.

Colapesce and Dimartino participated at Sanremo Music Festival 2021 with the song "Musica leggerissima", and the song was a surprise hit, ranking first on the Italian hit parade. The track also featured on Colapesce and Dimartino's second album I mortali². In 2022 they collaborated with rapper Fabri Fibra in the hit single "Propaganda"; the same year they featured the Cerrone's single "Non chiamarmi mai", an Italian version of Cerrone's 1979 song "Call Me Tonight". They took part at Sanremo Music Festival 2023 with the song "Splash", winning the Mia Martini Critics Award. The same year they made their film debut, both as actors and screenwriters, in La primavera della mia vita.

== Discography ==
=== Studio albums ===
- Un meraviglioso declino (2012)
- Egomostro (2015)
- Infedele (2017)
- I mortali (2020) with Dimartino
- Lux Eterna Beach (2023) with Dimartino

=== Extended plays ===
- Colapesce (2010)
- Nove cover (2012)
- Compendio infedele (2018)
