= Gianluca Grignani =

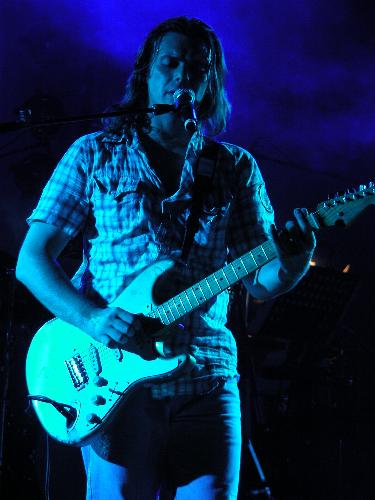
- Gianluca Grignani (2008)

Background information
- Born: 7 April 1972 (age 54); Milan, Italy
- Genres: Pop rock; soft rock
- Occupations: Singer; songwriter; guitarist
- Instruments: Vocals; guitar
- Years active: 1994–present
- Labels: Mercury, Ils, Strategic Marketing, PolyGram, Universal, Balboa, Columbia, Sony
- Website: grignani.it

Gianluca Grignani (born 7 April 1972) is an Italian singer-songwriter and guitarist.

== Biography ==
His musical career took off after meeting guitarist and producer Massimo Luca. After Grignani performed in the 1994 Festival di Sanremo, PolyGram persuaded him to release the acoustic ballad "La mia storia tra le dita".

In 1995, Grignani managed a breakthrough with the album Destinazione Paradiso, which sold two million copies within a year, and for which he was awarded the Telegatto.

"La mia storia tra le dita" became a number-one hit all over Iberoamerica and other countries in Europe. He released a Spanish-language version called "Mi historia entre tus dedos".

On 4 December 2022, it was officially announced Gianluca Grignani participation in the Sanremo Music Festival 2023. "Quando ti manca il fiato" was later announced as his entry for the Sanremo Music Festival 2023.

== Selected discography ==
- 1995 – Destinazione Paradiso
- 1995 – Destino Paraíso
- 1996 – La Fabbrica di Plastica
- 1998 – Campi di Popcorn
- 1999 – Il Giorno Perfetto
- 2000 – Sdraiato Su Una Nuvola
- 2000 – Sentado En Una Nube
- 2002 – Uguali e Diversi
- 2003 – Succo di Vita
- 2005 – Il Re del Niente
- 2008 – Cammina Nel Sole
- 2009 – Best of
- 2010 – Romantico Rock Show
- 2011 – Natura Umana
- 2013 – Essential
- 2015 – A Volte Esagero
- 2016 – Una Strada in Mezzo al Cielo
