= Made in Italy (song) =

Single by Rosa Chemical
- Published: 9 February 2023
- Genre: Dance-pop
- Length: 2:58
- Label: Universal Music Italia
- Lyricists: Manuel Rocati, Paolo Antonacci
- Producers: Bdope, Simonetta

Rosa Chemical singles chronology
"Non è normale" (2022)	"Made in Italy" (2023)	"Bellu guaglione" (2023)

Music video
- "Made in Italy" on YouTube

Made in Italy is a song by Italian singer Rosa Chemical, released by Universal Music Italia on 9 February 2023. The song competed at the Sanremo Music Festival 2023, finishing in eighth position. It was written by the singer and Paolo Antonacci, and produced by Bdope and Davide Simonetta.

== Music video ==
A music video, directed by Asia Jennifer Lanni and Nicola Bussei was released on YouTube on the same day of the single's release.

== Charts ==
=== Weekly charts ===
Chart performance for "Made in Italy"
Chart (2023)	Peak position
Italy (FIMI)	6
Italy Airplay (EarOne)	10

=== Year-end charts ===
2023 year-end chart performance for "Made in Italy"
Chart (2023)	Position
Italy (FIMI)	39

== Certifications ==
Certifications for "Made in Italy"
Region	Certification	Certified units/sales
Italy (FIMI)	2× Platinum	200,000^{‡}
^{‡} Sales+streaming figures based on certification alone.
