= Salmo (rapper) =

Italian rapper (born 1984)

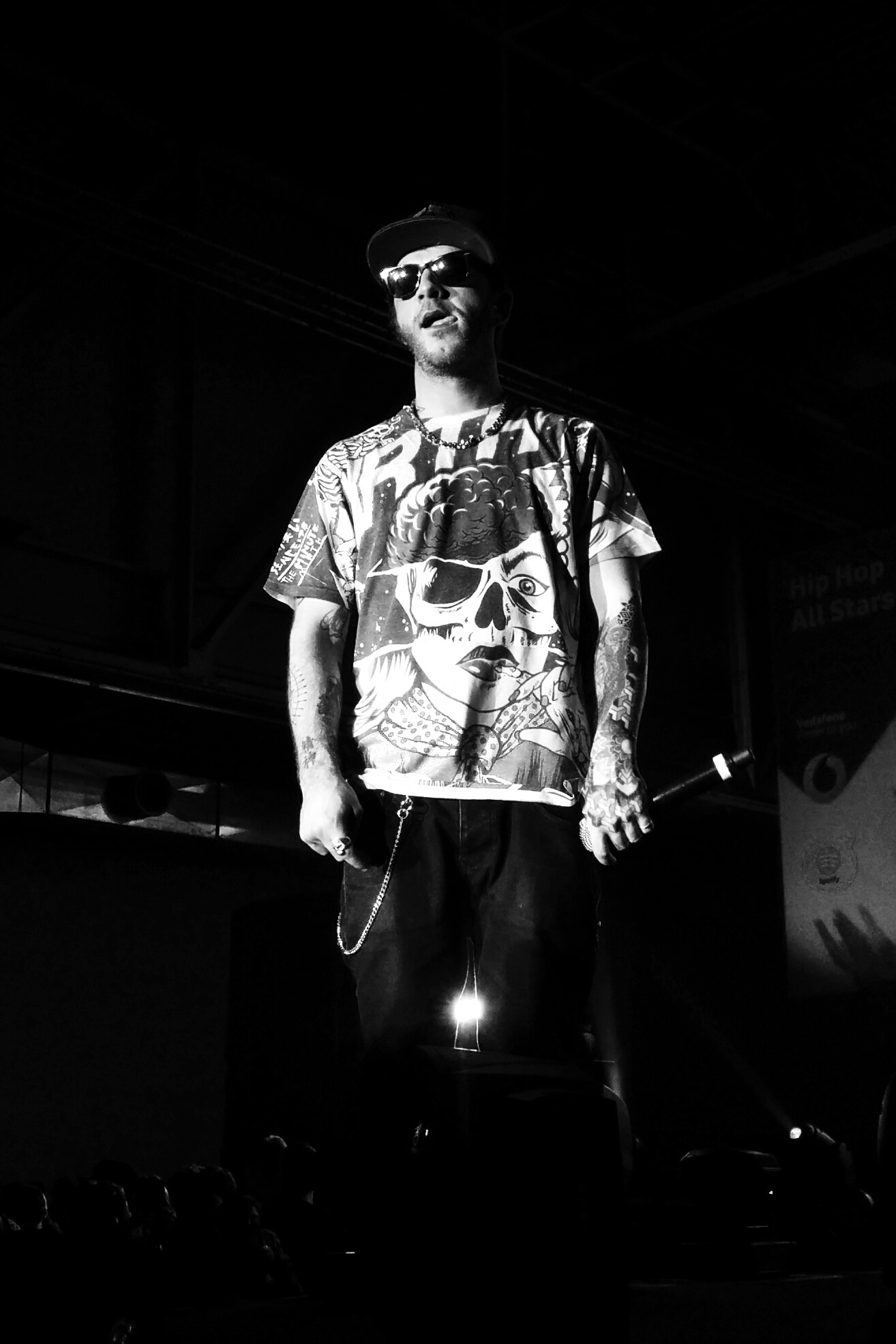
- Salmo during a concert in Milan in 2014

Background information
- Born: Maurizio Pisciottu; 29 June 1984 (age 42)
- Origin: Olbia, Sardinia, Italy
- Genres: Hip hop; rap rock; rap metal; rapcore; alternative hip hop
- Occupations: Rapper; songwriter; record producer; actor
- Years active: 1997–present
- Labels: Sony Music; Machete Empire Records
- Website: salmonlebon.com

Maurizio Pisciottu (born 29 June 1984), known professionally as Salmo, is an Italian rapper. Since his debut in the Italian music scene, he has released five solo albums, peaking at number one three times, and numerous successful singles and collaborations, selling over 3 million copies in Italy.

== Biography ==
=== 2011–2012: The Island Chainsaw Massacre and Death USB ===
In 2011, Salmo published his first studio album, titled The Island Chainsaw Massacre, which quickly gave notoriety to the rapper in the national rap scene.

Furthermore, in the same year Salmo released his second album Death USB, published on 23 February, which saw the publication of five Video clips, namely those of Il pentacolo, Negative Youth, Death USB, Doomsday and Demons to Diamonds. Also, at the MTV Hip Hop Awards 2012, Salmo won in the category "Best Crossover". Still in 2012, the rapper took part to the realization of Machete Crew mixtape Machete Mixtape Vol II, in which are present Stupido gioco del rap and Disobey, from which some video clips have been extracted, published on 17 November and 24 January 2013.

=== 2013: Midnite ===
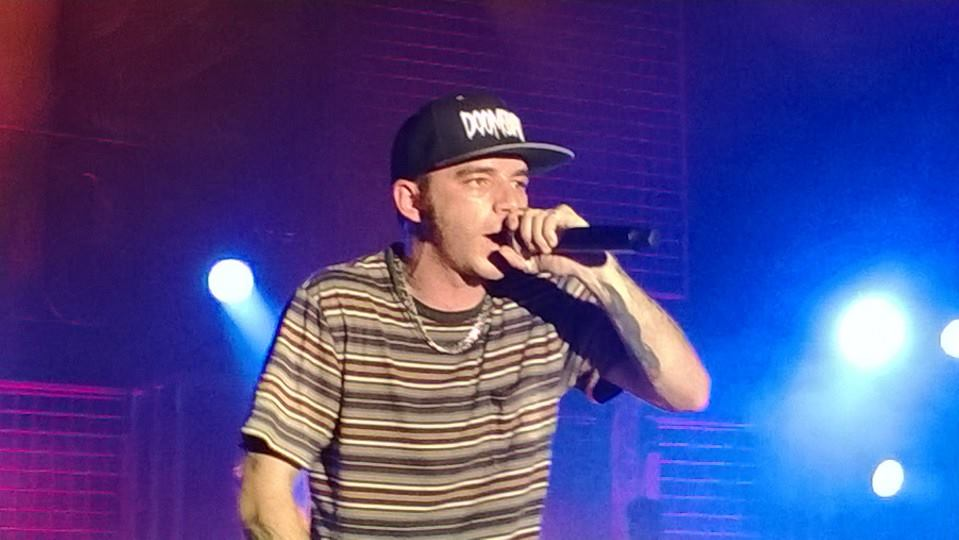
Salmo's concert in Milan in 2013

On 18 March 2013, the rapper announced the track list of his third album Midnite (slang for "midnight"), published on 2 April and first teased on 21 March by the single Russell Crowe. The album debuted at the first position on the Italian music industry organization's rankings. On 18 April, Rob Zombie's video clip, a song made in collaboration with Noyz Narcos, was released, while the video clip of S.A.L.M.O. was released on 1 July. On 22 July, the video clip of the song Killer Game was released, in collaboration with Gemitaiz and MadMan, while Midnite on 25 July was certified as a gold record for reaching the threshold of 30,000 copies sold.

In August, the rapper collaborated with Dutch horrorcore group Dope D.O.D. in the track Blood Shake, which was officially released on 5 September. The video clip was published in December.

The Island, a single featured with El Raton, En?gma and DJ Slait, was released on 17 September, the date when the video was also released. On 7 October was released the video clip of Midnite's closing track, Faraway, while on 26 November was released that for the piece Space Invaders, which saw the participation of Nitro.

On 24 December, the rapper released a standalone Christmas freestyle entitled Buon N ***** in collaboration with rappers Gemitaiz and MadMan.

=== 2014: S.A.L.M.O. Documentary and the release from Tanta Roba ===
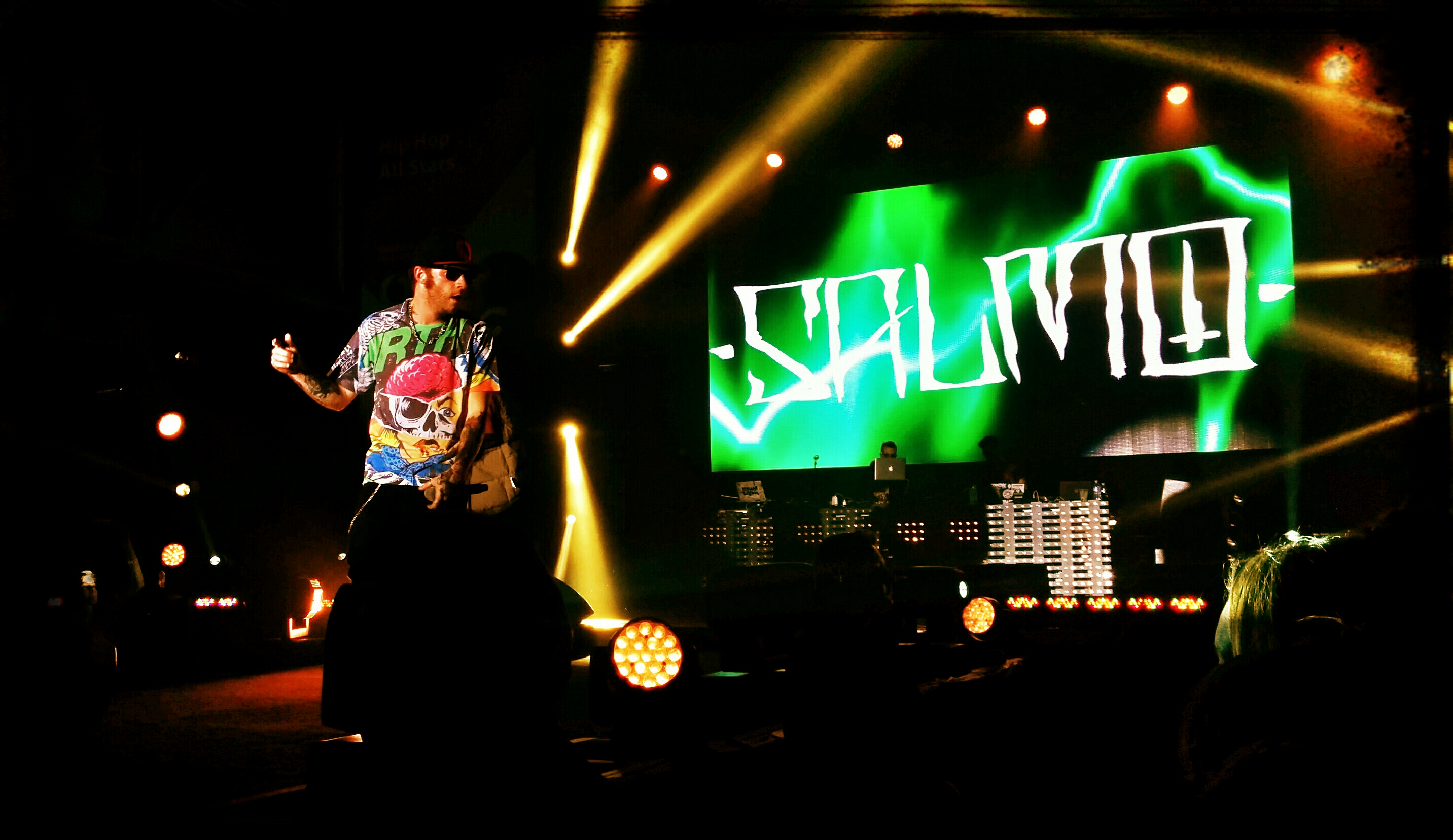
Salmo's concert in Milan in 2014

On 19 May 2014, through his Facebook page, Salmo announced his release from Tanta Roba, revealing that the fourth studio album would be published by Machete Empire Records and that the latest publication, with the label of DJ Harsh and Gué Pequeno, would be the live album S.A.L.M.O. Documentary, released 17 June. This last album contains some songs performed live during the tour in support of Midnite, a documentary and the unreleased Mussoleeni, published digitally on 5 June.

On 5 August 2014 the rapper released the first single named La bestia in me for the Mixtape Machete Mixtape III, a record of Machete Empire. It released 23 September. On 2 September the music video for the song Venice Beach, from Machete Mixtape III, was published exclusively on the Red Bull website.

=== 2015–2016: Hellvisback ===
Towards the end of 2014 he directed the videoclip of the single Sabato of famous Italian singer Jovanotti, together with Antonio Usbergo and Nicolò Celaia (both of YouNuts!). The collaboration with Jovanotti continued during 2015 with the realization of a remix of Sabato and with the participation at the Lorenzo negli stadi 2015 Tour as opening artist. In 2015 Salmo also collaborated with Noyz Narcos and Fritz da Cat on the song Dal tramonto all'alba, published as third single from Localz Only album on 29 May of the same year.

On 18 December 2015 Salmo published the single 1984, entirely composed by the rapper himself and promoted by the related videoclip released on the same day. At the same time as the release of the single, the fourth studio album Hellvisback, was announced releasing on 5 February 2016.

=== 2017–2023: Playlist ===
On 6 March 2017 Salmo acted as the protagonist in a Short film named Nuraghes S'Arena, directed by Mauro Aragoni and released exclusively by Paramount Channel. Later on 21 July the rapper returned to music with the release of Estate Dimmerda together with a music video. On 24 November, Salmo released another single, entitled Perdonami, debuting at the top of the Italian singles chart.

In 2018 Salmo makes appearances in the albums No Comment by Nitro and Enemy by Noyz Narcos, in the songs Chairaggione and Mick Check respectively. On 8 March Salmo announces the release of his fifth studio album, Playlist, and his first two concerts where it could be heard live. At PalaLottomatica in Rome on 16 December and at Mediolanum Forum in Assago on 22 December. The album was released on 9 November, consisting of 13 tracks, with guests such as Fabri Fibra, Nitro, NSTASIA, Sfera Ebbasta and Coez. The album was preceded by the release of the single 90min (21 September) and by an advertising campaign involving an exhibition in front of the Duomo in Milan where Salmo disguised himself as a homeless man. The advertising campaign also involved the publication of a promotional video on the Pornographic video sharing website, Pornhub.

=== 2019–2020: Machete Mixtape 4 ===
On 5 July 2019 Salmo released Machete Mixtape 4, a collaborative compilation album with many rappers (largely from Machete Empire Records roster) in which he participates and produces a large portion of the 18 song track-list.

=== 2021: Flop ===
Three years after his previous album, Salmo released and album called Flop on 1 October 2021. On 22 July 2021 for the first time Salmo spoke about his new album in an interview with Radio 105. Flop was named in this way because Salmo considered it as his "worst album". in the next three days, flop was the most streamed album on Spotify.

=== 2022: Blocco 181 ===
Salmo appeared in an Italian series called Blocco 181 in 2022, but none of his own music is included on it. He stated he purposely did not want to include his music to keep it separate than his acting.

=== 2023: Cvlt with Noyz Narcos ===
This album, a collaboration with Noyz Narcos, consists of fifteen tracks and was preceded by a short film directed by horror director Dario Argento. In fact the sound is visibly harsher and heavier than the two rappers' latest works, even if it contains elements of electronic and pop music.

== Discography ==
=== Studio albums ===
- Premeditazione e dolo (1999)
- Sotto pelle (2004)
- Mr. Antipatia (2005)
- The Island Chainsaw Massacre (2011)
- Death USB (2012)
- Midnite (2013)
- S.A.L.M.O. Documentary (2014)
- Hellvisback (2016)
- Playlist (2018)
- Playlist Live (2019)
- Flop (2021)
- Salmo Unplugged (2022)
- Blocco 181 (Official Soundtrack) (2022)
- Cvlt with Noyz Narcos (2023)
- Ranch (2025)

=== With Skasico ===
- Terapia (2004)
- 21 Grams (2006)
- Orange Bloom EP (2008)

=== With Three Pigs' Trip ===
- Merciful Bullets EP (2010)

== Filmography ==
Year	Title	Role(s)	Notes
2016	Zeta: A Hip Hop Story	Himself	Cameo appearance
2017	Nuraghes S'Arena	Arduè	Short film
2021	Noyz Narcos: Dope Boys Alphabet	Himself	Documentary
2022–present	Blocco 181	Snake	Series regular, also executive producer
2023	Sanremo Music Festival 2023	Guest performer	Performing with Shari in the duets night
2023	CVLT	Himself (fictional version)	Short film
