= Gianmaria (singer) =

Italian singer-songwriter (born 5 August 2002)

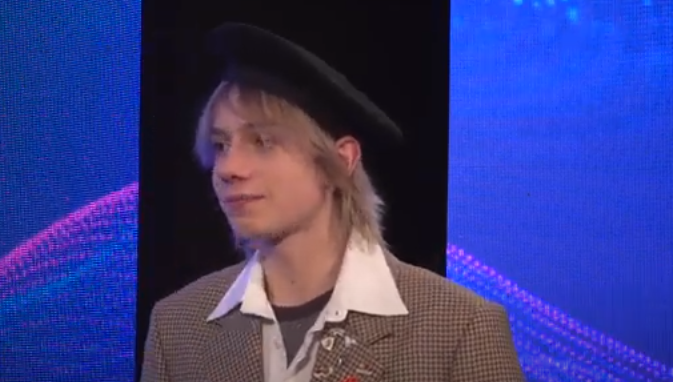
- Gianmaria (2023)

Background information
- Born: Gianmaria Volpato; 25 August 2002 (age 24); Vicenza, Veneto, Italy
- Genres: Pop; hip hop
- Occupations: Singer; songwriter
- Instrument: Vocals
- Years active: 2020–present
- Labels: Epic; Sony Music

Gianmaria Volpato (born 25 August 2002) known professionally as Gianmaria (stylized as gIANMARIA) is an Italian singer-songwriter.

== Biography ==
Volpato was born in Vicenza. He showed an immediate interest in music at the age of 13. During his early musical studies, he alternated his studies by working at a local pizzeria.

In 2021, he took part in the fifteenth edition of the Italian talent show X Factor, under the guidance of mentor Emma Marrone, finishing in second place behind Baltimora. In conjunction with the talent show, he presented his debut single "I suicidi", previously performed during the auditions, written by himself in collaboration with Nicolas "Bais" Biasin.

After the talent show, Gianmaria obtained a recording contract with the label Epic Records, with whom released the singles "Tutto o niente 2" and "Mamma scusa". These tracks anticipated the release of the debut EP entitled "Fallirò", which was released on 14 January 2022. The EP debuts at position 25 on the Classifica FIMI Artisti, and is being promoted through the Fallirò Tour 2022.

In November 2022, Gianmaria was one of 12 acts selected to compete in Sanremo Giovani, a televised competition aimed at selecting six newcomers as contestants of the 73rd Sanremo Music Festival. Gianmaria placed first during the show, with his entry "La città che odi", by rightfully accessing the festival in the Campioni category. "Mostro" was later announced as his entry for the Sanremo Music Festival 2023.

== Discography ==
=== Studio albums ===
List of studio albums with details and chart positions
Title	Album details	Peak chart positions
Title	Album details	ITA
Mostro	Released: 3 February 2023; Label: Epic, Sony Music	20

=== Extended plays ===
List of EPs with details and chart positions
Title	EP details	Peak chart positions
Title	EP details	ITA
Fallirò	Released: 14 January 2022; Label: Epic, Sony Music	25

=== Singles ===
==== As lead artist ====
List of singles as lead artist, with selected chart positions, showing year released and album name
Title	Year	Peak chart positions	Certifications	Album
Title	Year	ITA	Certifications	Album
"I suicidi"	2021	74		Fallirò
"Tutto o niente 2"	2021	—		Non-album singles
"Mamma scusa"	2021	—		Non-album singles
"Ascolta"	2021	—		Non-album singles
"Senza saliva"	2021	—		Fallirò
"Fallirò"	2022	—		Fallirò
"Non dovevo farlo"	2022	—		Fallirò
"I bambini"	2022	—		Non-album single
"La città che odi"	2022	—		Mostro
"Mostro"	2023	16	FIMI: Gold	Mostro
"Io ti conosco" (with Madame)	2023	75		Non-album single

==== As featured artist ====
List of singles, with chart positions, album name and certifications
Title	Year	Peak chart positions	Certifications	Album
Title	Year	ITA	Certifications	Album
"Amore Spray" (Close Listen featuring Side Baby and Gianmaria)	2022	—		Amore Spray
"Disco Dance" (Francesca Michielin featuring Gianmaria)	2023	—		Cani sciolti

== Television ==
- X Factor (Sky Uno, 2021) Contestant - Runner-up
- Sanremo Giovani 2022 (Rai 1, 2022) Contestant - Winner

== Tournées ==
- 2022 – Fallirò tour 2022
