= Shari (singer) =

Italian singer (born 2002)

- Born: Shari Noioso; 14 October 2002 (age 23); Monfalcone, Friuli-Venezia Giulia, Italy
- Genres: Pop; soul
- Occupation: Singer
- Instruments: Vocals; piano
- Years active: 2016–present
- Labels: Columbia Records; Sony Music Italy

Shari Noioso (born 14 October 2002), known professionally as Shari, is an Italian singer.

== Biography ==
Noioso was born in Monfalcone, and then grew up in Udine. She showed an immediate interest in music at the age of 10, starting to study singing and piano at The Groove Factory Academy.

In 2015, she took part in the second edition of Italian talent show Tú sí que vales on Canale 5 and, after successfully making it through the initial stages, performed during the final without making the podium. After the talent show experience, Shari obtained a recording contract with the label Warner Music, with whom he released covers of "Imagine" and "The Sound of Silence" and the debut single "Don't You Run". In 2016, Shari was a support artist for Il Volo during the L'amore si muove Tour.

In 2019, she collaborated with the duo Benji & Fede on the single "Sale", which was certified gold with over 35 000 units sold in Italy. In the same year, she was confirmed among the twenty semi-finalists at Sanremo Giovani 2019, but failed to obtain a pass to enter the Sanremo Music Festival 2020. In 2021, she collaborated with rapper Salmo on the single "L'angelo caduto", taken from the latter's studio album FLOP, which was also certified gold for its sales of over 35 000 units.

In July 2022, after obtaining a contract with Columbia Records, she released her debut EP Fake Music, which deviated from her previous works by being influenced by genres such as black music and soul. In November of the same year, Noioso was one of 12 acts selected to compete in Sanremo Giovani, a televised competition aimed at selecting six newcomers as contestants of the 73rd Sanremo Music Festival. Shari manage to qualify in the top six, with her entry "Sotto voce", by rightfully accessing the festival in the Campioni category. "Egoista" was later announced as her entry for the Sanremo Music Festival 2023.

== Personal life ==
Her boyfriend is the Italian rapper Salmo.

== Discography ==
=== Studio albums ===
List of studio albums with details
Title	Album details	Peak chart positions
Title	Album details	ITA
Amore & blues	Released: 29 November 2024; Label: Columbia Records, Sony Music Italy	—

=== Extended plays ===
List of EPs with details
Title	EP details	Peak chart positions
Title	EP details	ITA
Fake Music	Released: 21 July 2022; Label: Columbia Records, Sony Music Italy	—
Alice in Hell	Released: 26 May 2023; Label: Sony Music Italy	—

=== Singles ===
List of singles as lead artist, with selected chart positions, showing year released and album name
Title	Year	Peak chart positions	Certifications	Album
Title	Year	ITA	Certifications	Album
"Imagine/The Sound of Silence"	2016	—		Non-album singles
"Don't You Run"	2016	—		Non-album singles
"Stella"	2019	—		Non-album singles
"Follia"	2021	—		Non-album singles
"Un altro giro"	2022	—		Non-album singles
"Lo destesto"	2022	—		Non-album singles
"Sotto voce"	2022	—		Non-album singles
"Egoista"	2023	38		Non-album singles

==== As featured artist ====
List of singles, with chart positions, album name and certifications
Title	Year	Peak chart positions	Certifications	Album
Title	Year	ITA	Certifications	Album
"Sale" (Benji & Fede featuring Shari)	2019	67	FIMI: Gold	Good Vibes
"Testamento (La resa dei conti)" (Slait, Low Kidd featuring J. Lord and Shari)	2021	—		Non-album single
"L'angelo caduto" (Salmo featuring Shari)	2021	25	FIMI: Gold	FLOP

== Television ==
- Tú sí que vales (Canale 5, 2015) Contestant - Finalist
- Sanremo Giovani 2019 (Rai 1, 2019) Contestant
- Sanremo Giovani 2022 (Rai 1, 2022) Contestant - Finalist
