= Rosa Chemical =

Italian rapper, graffiti artist and model

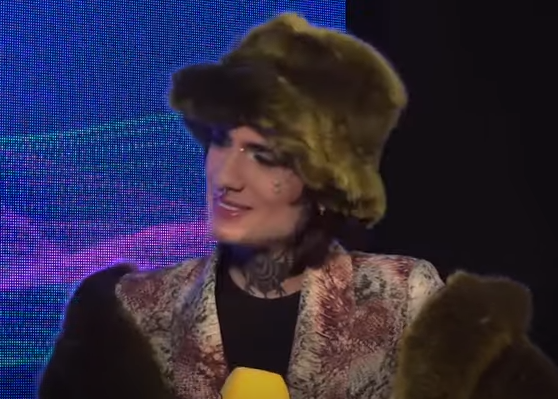
- Rosa Chemical (2023)

Background information
- Born: Manuel Franco Rocati; 30 January 1998 (age 28); Rivoli, Piedmont, Italy
- Genres: Alternative hip hop; trap
- Occupations: Rapper; singer; songwriter; model
- Instrument: Vocals
- Years active: 2015–present
- Labels: Thaurus Music; Universal Music Group

Manuel Franco Rocati (born 30 January 1998), known professionally as Rosa Chemical, is an Italian rapper, singer, songwriter, graffiti artist and model.

== Biography ==
Rocati was born in Rivoli and grew up in Alpignano, in the metropolitan city of Turin. Their pseudonym is a portmanteau of the terms "Rosa", their mother's first name, and "Chemical", from the American band My Chemical Romance. Before becoming interested in hip hop music, they were a graffiti artist, as visible in the programme YO! MTV Raps, around Europe.

Their music career began in 2018, when they released the single "Kournikova", becoming at the same time model for the Italian fashion label Gucci. In February 2019, they began a collaboration with Italian record producer Greg Willen, releasing the single "Rovesciata", which anticipated the release of the EP Okay Okay!!. In August they released "Tik Tok" in collaboration with Radical, which reached Spotify Italy's Viral 50.

In 2020, they released the singles "Alieno", in collaboration with UncleBac, and "Polka", which anticipated the release of the first studio album Forever, released on May 28, of the same year. On March 25, 2021, the album was reissued under the title Forever and Ever, containing five bonus tracks, which was preceded by the single "Britney", in collaboration with MamboLosco and Radical.

On 4 February 2022, they were a guest on the cover night of the Sanremo Music Festival, where they performed alongside Tananai a rearrangement of the song "A far l'amore comincia tu" by Raffaella Carrà, entitled "Comincia tu". On 4 December of the same year, it was officially announced that Rosa Chemical will participate in the Sanremo Music Festival 2023. "Made in Italy" was later announced as their entry for the Sanremo Music Festival 2023. In the final of the competition, they came in 8th place. On the final night of the competition, during their performance, they approached the rapper Fedez in the audience and the two mimed having sexual intercourse. The two were denounced for indecent acts in a public place, but the courts did not uphold the complaint.

They performed as a guest on the second night of the Sanremo Music Festival 2024, performing their 2023 entry to the festival, "Made in Italy."

In the following year, they appeared as a judge on the Italian version of the talent show Starstruck, "Like a Star" hosted by Amadeus and broadcast on the Italian TV channel Nove. On 16 May 2026 they release their third EP Okay okay 2. In the same year, they announced their participation in the 20th season of the Italian version of Dancing with the Stars (Ballando con le Stelle) on Rai 1.

In 2026 they participated in the San Marino Song Contest 2026 with the song Mammamì.

They identify as gender-fluid.

== Discography ==
- Forever (2020)
