= Leo Gassmann =

Italian singer-songwriter and actor (born 1998)

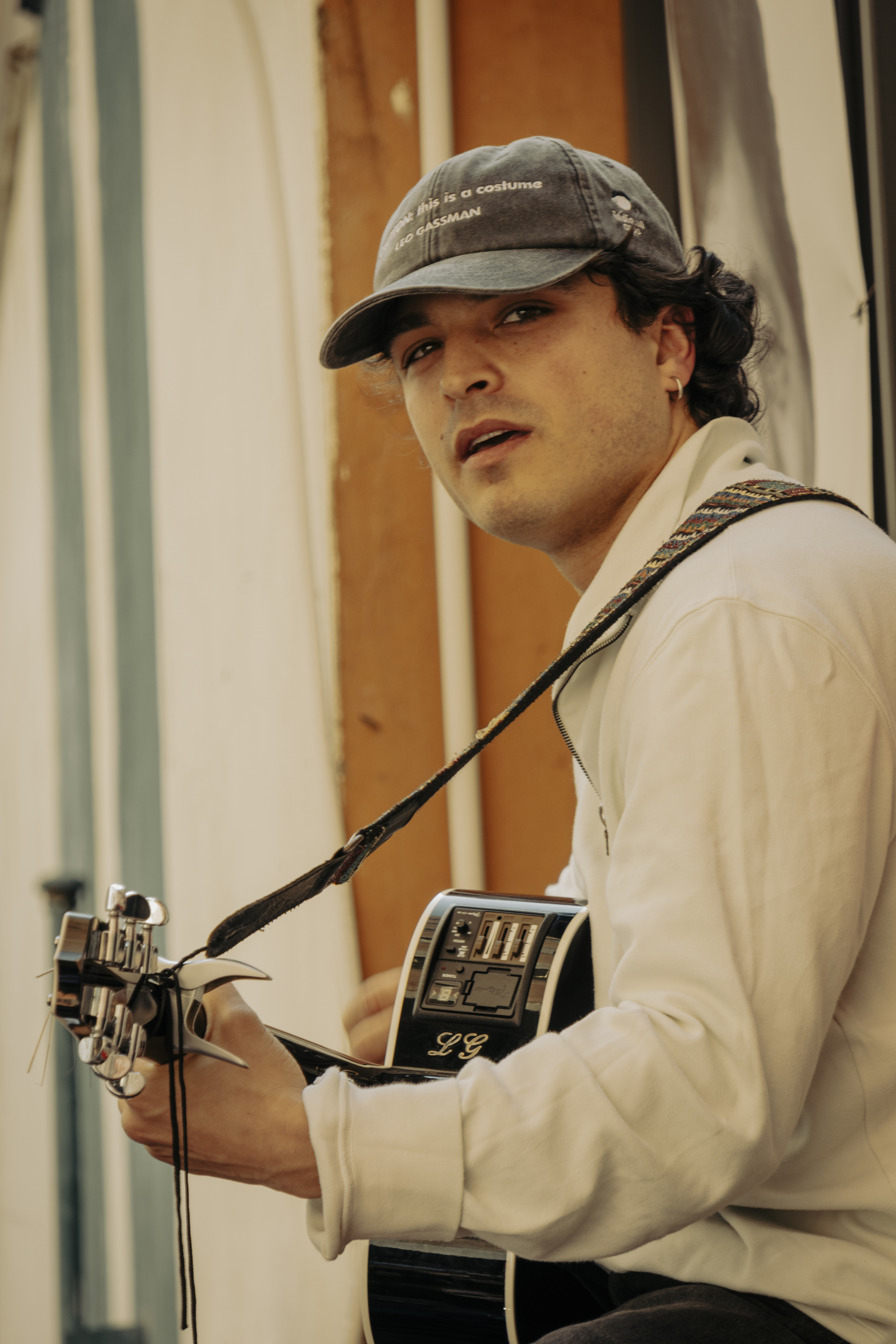
- Leo Gassmann in April 2025

Background information
- Born: Leo Gassmann; 22 November 1998 (age 27); Rome, Lazio, Italy
- Genres: Pop
- Occupations: Singer; songwriter; actor
- Instruments: Vocals; guitar
- Years active: 2018–present
- Labels: Sony Music (2018–2019); Universal (2019–present); Virgin (2022–2023); EMI (2024–present)

Leo Gassmann (born 22 November 1998) is an Italian singer-songwriter and actor.

== Biography ==
Born in Rome, he is the son of the actors Alessandro Gassmann and Sabrina Knaflitz and the grandson of the actors Vittorio Gassman and Juliette Mayniel.

In 2018, he participated at the twelfth edition of the Italian X Factor; he ended up fifth and released his debut single "Piume".

Gassmann competed and won at the "Newcomers" section of the Sanremo Music Festival 2020 with the song "Vai bene così". His first studio album Strike was released on 7 February 2020.

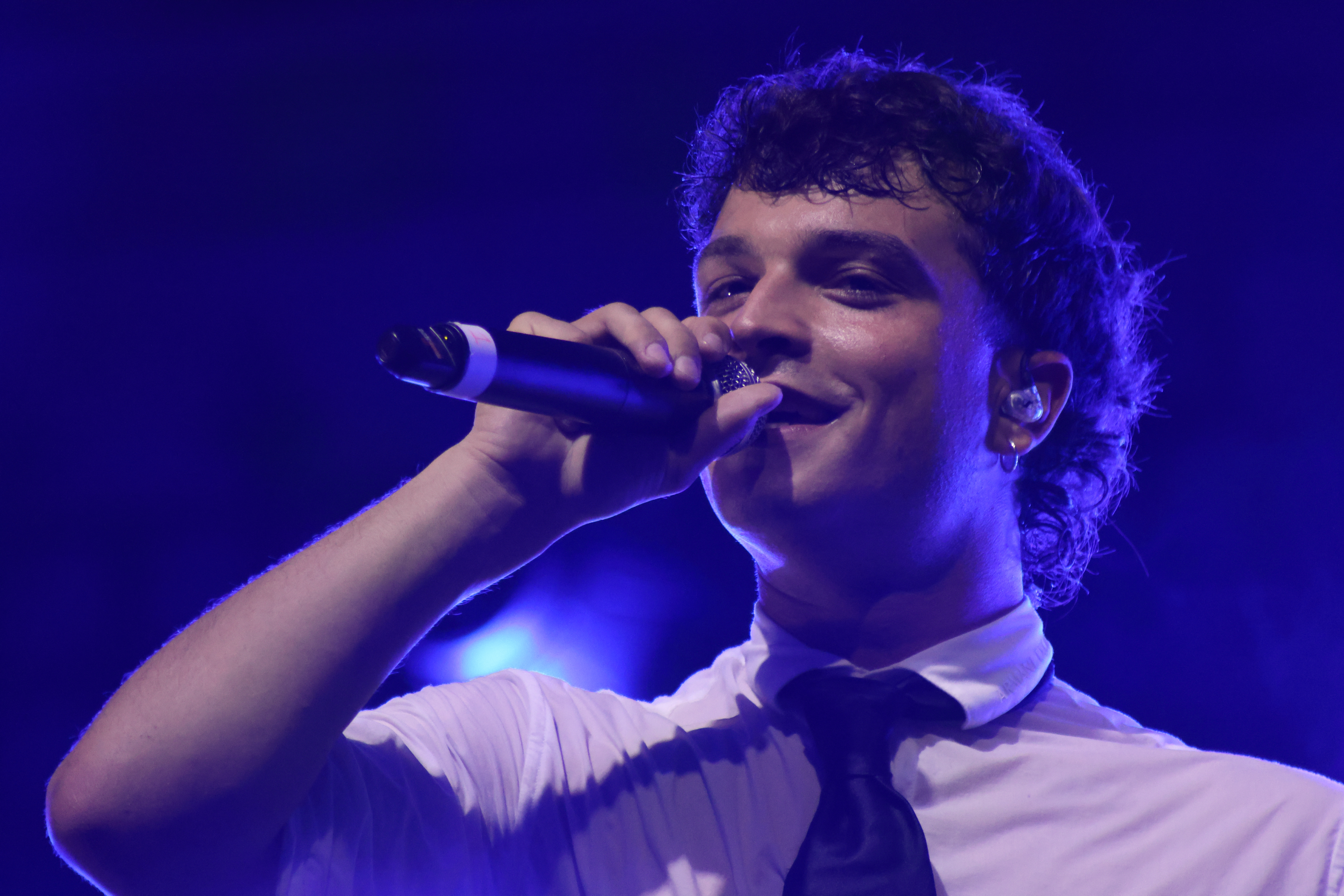
Gassmann performing in 2023

Gassmann participated in the Sanremo Music Festival 2023 with the song "Terzo cuore". On 30 November 2025, he was announced among the participants of the Sanremo Music Festival 2026. He competed with the song "Naturale", where he placed 28th.

== Discography ==
=== Studio albums ===
List of albums, with chart positions and certifications
Title	Album details	Peak chart positions
Title	Album details	ITA
Strike	Released: 7 February 2020; Label: Universal Music; Format: Digital download, CD, LP	36
La strada per Agartha	Released: 24 February 2023; Label: Universal Music; Format: Digital download, CD, LP	64

=== Singles ===
List of singles, with chart positions, album name and certifications
Single	Year	Peak chart positions	Certifications	Album
Single	Year	ITA	Certifications	Album
"Piume"	2018	18		Non-album single
"Dimmi dove sei"	2019	—		Strike
"Vai bene così"	2019	18		Strike
"Maleducato"	2020	—		Strike
"Mr. Fonda"	2020	—		Strike
"Down"	2021	—		Non-album single
"La mia libertà"	2022	—		La strada per Agartha
"Lunedì"	2022	—		La strada per Agartha
"Terzo cuore"	2023	28	FIMI: Gold	La strada per Agartha
"Volo rovescio"	2023	—		La strada per Agartha
"Capiscimi"	2023	—		La strada per Agartha
"Dammi un bacio ja'"	2023	—		Non-album singles
"Take That"	2024	—		Non-album singles
"A cosa serve l'estate" (with Svegliaginevra)	2024	—		Non-album singles
"E poi sei arrivata tu"	2025	—		Non-album singles
"Free drink"	2025	—		Non-album singles
"Naturale"	2026	43		Non-album singles
"—" denotes an item that did not chart in that country.

== Filmography ==
=== Films ===
Year	Title	Role	Notes
2020	The Croods: A New Age	Guy Crood	Italian dub; voice role
2024	Mufasa: The Lion King	Mufasa	Italian dub; voice role
2024	Una terapia di gruppo	Otto	

=== Television ===
Year	Title	Role	Notes
2018	X Factor	Contestant	Talent show (season 12)
2020	Sanremo Music Festival 2020	Contestant	Annual music festival
2023	Sanremo Music Festival 2023	Contestant	Annual music festival
2024	Califano	Franco Califano	Television movie
2024	Nudes	Jacopo	Episode: "Silvia ed Emilio"
2026	Sanremo Music Festival 2026	Contestant	Annual music festival
