= Bnkr44 =

Italian musical collective

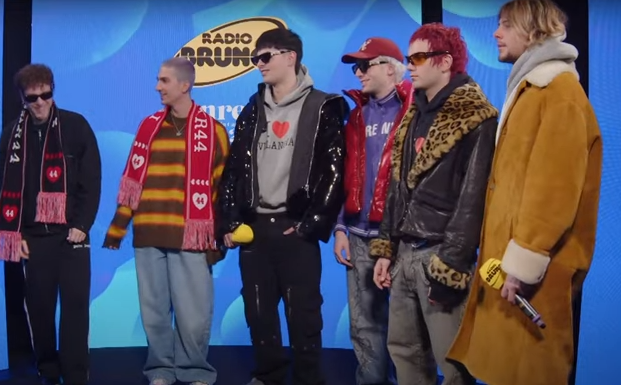
- Bnkr44 (2024)

Background information
- Origin: Empoli, Tuscany, Italy
- Genres: Pop; indie pop; pop rap; drum and bass
- Occupation: Musical collective
- Years active: 2019–present
- Labels: Bomba Dischi; Universal Music Italy
- Members: Fares; Erin; Caph; Jxn; Faster; Piccolo

Bnkr44 (Bunker Quarantaquattro pronounced [ˈbuŋker kwaˌrantaˈkwattro] and stylized as bnkr44) is an Italian musical collective formed in Empoli in 2019.

== History ==
Bnkr44 formed as a collective of six in Empoli, a town in Tuscany, on 4 April 2019. Their name is a reference to the bunker, a former tannery repurposed as a studio for the band, as well as to the date (4/4) on which they were established. After initially uploading their songs to SoundCloud, they published their first album, 44.Deluxe, in 2020 with the label Bomba Dischi.

They participated in the fourth evening of the Sanremo Music Festival 2023, singing with Sethu a cover version of "Charlie fa surf", originally by Baustelle.

In 2023, they reached the top 3 of the Sanremo Giovani song contest with their song "Effetti speciali", earning them a spot in the Sanremo Music Festival 2024 where they performed "Governo punk".

== Band members ==
- Fares (Pietro Serafini)
- Erin (Dario Lombardi)
- Caph (Marco Vittiglio)
- JxN (Jacopo Adamo)
- Faster (Andrea Locci)
- Piccolo (Duccio Caponi)

== Discography ==
=== Albums ===
List of albums with details
Title	Release date	Label	Peak chart positions
Title	Release date	Label	ITA
44.Deluxe	4 November 2020	Bomba Dischi	—
Farsi male a noi va bene	26 November 2021	Bomba Dischi	34
Farsi male a noi va bene 2.0	26 May 2022	Bomba Dischi	—
Fuoristrada	28 April 2023	Bomba Dischi	48
Tocca il cielo	3 April 2025	Bomba Dischi	14

=== Singles ===
==== As lead artist ====
List of singles, with chart positions, album name and certifications
Title	Year	Peak chart positions	Certifications	Album
Title	Year	ITA	Certifications	Album
"Cosa ci resta"	2022	—	—	Farsi male a noi va bene
"So chi sei"	2022	—	—	Farsi male a noi va bene 2.0
"Per non sentire la noia" (featuring Jvli)	2023	—	—	Fuoristrada
"Guida spericolata"	2023	—	—	Fuoristrada
"Effetti speciali"	2023	—	—	Non-album single
"Governo punk"	2024	20	FIMI: Gold	Tocca il cielo
"Ma che idea" (with Pino D'Angiò)	2024	21	FIMI: Platinum	Tocca il cielo
"Estate 80"	2024	69	FIMI: Gold	Non-album single
"Capolavoro"	2025	—	—	Tocca il cielo
"Spa cabaret"	2025	—	—	Tocca il cielo
"Luna rossa"	2025	—	—	Tocca il cielo

==== As featured artist ====
List of charting singles as featured artist, with chart positions, album name and certifications
Title	Year	Peak chart positions	Certifications	Album
Title	Year	ITA	Certifications	Album
"Diavolo" (Night Skinny, Ghali & Rkomi feat. Tedua & Bnkr44)	2022	6	FIMI: Gold	Non-album singles
"Così non va" (Night Skinny & Rkomi feat. Madame, Bnkr44, Gaia & Elisa)	2022	60	—	Non-album singles
"La verità" (Tedua feat. Bnkr44)	2022	22	FIMI: Gold	Non-album singles
