= Splash (Colapesce and Dimartino song) =

2023 single by Colapesce & Dimartino

Single by Colapesce and Dimartino
- Language: Italian
- Released: 9 February 2023
- Genre: Indie pop
- Length: 3:30
- Label: Sony Music Entertainment Italy
- Songwriters: Antonio Dimartino; Lorenzo Urciullo
- Producers: Federico Nardelli; Giordano Colombo

Colapesce singles chronology
"Non chiamarmi mai" (2023)	"Splash" (2023)	"Considera" (2023)

Dimartino singles chronology
"Non chiamarmi mai" (2023)	"Splash" (2023)	"Considera" (2023)

Music video
- "Splash" on YouTube

"Splash" is a song written and recorded by Italian singer-songwriters Colapesce and Dimartino. The song competed in the 2023 edition of the Sanremo Music Festival, placing 10th in a field of 28. The song was awarded the Mia Martini Critics Award, and also received the "Lucio Dalla" Press, Radio, TV, & Web Award. The song is part of their film debut La primavera della mia vita.

== Lyrics ==
The song deals with two different but interconnected themes: the weight of expectations that drive people to always seek something more, not enjoying what they already have, and the restlessness to constantly do things so as not to feel the emptiness of life.

== Reception ==
The song was well received by critics. In its review of the Sanremo songs, Rolling Stone Italia gave the song a 10/10, describing the song as their ideal winner, and as a song which "has everything: the musical construction, the lyrics, the unspoken triggering the imagination, the on-stage performance". The critic Stefano Benzi referred to the song as "smart, pandering, extremely clever lyrically and in terms of arrangements". Fabio Fiume from All Music Italia rated the song 8/10, writing the song is "nostalgic, truthful, ironic, and not least singable". The Panorama critic Gabriele Antonucci gave the song a 7,5 rating, putting the song above previous Colapesce-Dimartino's hit "Musica Leggerissima", and noting echoes of Lucio Battisti's 1970s productions, Domenico Modugno's "Vecchio frac" and Franco Battiato's electropop of the early 1980s. Gabriele Fazio from Agenzia Giornalistica Italia described the final 10th place at the Sanremo Festival as a "scandal", but praised their Mia Martini Critics' Award win, "not the most important prize but the only prize that counts".

== Music video ==
The music video for the song was directed by Salvo "Zavvo" Nicolosi and Giovanni Tomaselli.

== Other versions ==
A Spanish version of the song titled "Splash (màs que mares)" featuring Rigoberta Bandini was released in April 2024. South Korean crossover trio Penguin In The Water presented a cover version of the song during the singing competition show Phantom Singer.

== Charts ==
=== Weekly charts ===
Chart (2023)	Peak position
Italy (FIMI)	8
Italy Airplay (EarOne)	6
San Marino (SMRRTV Top 50)	7
Switzerland (Schweizer Hitparade)	91

=== Year-end charts ===
Year-end chart performance for "Splash"
Chart (2023)	Position
Italy (FIMI)	54

== Certifications ==
Certifications for "Splash"
Region	Certification	Certified units/sales
Italy (FIMI)	2× Platinum	200,000^{‡}
^{‡} Sales+streaming figures based on certification alone.
