= Colla Zio =

Italian musical group

- Origin: Milan, Lombardy, Italy
- Genres: Hip hop; urban
- Years active: 2019–present
- Label: Woodworm
- Members: Tommaso "Berna" Bernasconi; Andrea "Mala" Malatesta; Francesco "Glampo" Lamperti; Andrea "Armo" Arminio; Tommaso "Petta" Manzoni

Colla Zio is an Italian hip hop musical group formed in Milan in 2019. The group is composed by vocalists Tommaso "Berna" Bernasconi, Andrea "Mala" Malatesta, Francesco "Glampo" Lamperti, Andrea "Armo" Arminio and Tommaso "Petta" Manzoni.

== History ==
The music project was born in Milan, more precisely in the Piazza Leonardo da Vinci area. After performing at several festivals in the city, they released their first singles including "Bibite", "Americana", "Fuori il petto" and "Straintra".

In 2021 they obtained a recording contract with the label Woodworm, with whom they released their debut EP Zafferano, from which the single "Gremolada" was extracted. In the summer of the same year they performed at Mi Manchi, a substitute festival for the annual MI AMI Festival.

In April 2022, they released the single "Chiara", in collaboration with the Brazilian music group Selton, which brought the group national fame. In the summer of 2022, the group performed as the opening band for concerts of various artists including Blanco, Dutch Nazari and the Psicologi. At the same time, they continued to perform at major Italian music festivals such as Goa-Boa in Genoa and the Mengo Music Fest in Arezzo.

In September 2022, they participated in the Area Sanremo contest, winning one of the four spots available for Sanremo Giovani, a televised competition aimed at selecting six newcomers as contestants of the 73rd Sanremo Music Festival. Colla Zio manage to qualify in the top six, with their entry "Asfalto", by rightfully accessing the festival in the Campioni category. "Non mi va" was later announced as their entry for the Sanremo Music Festival 2023.

== Band members ==
- Tommaso "Berna" Bernasconi − vocals
- Andrea "Mala" Malatesta − vocals
- Francesco "Glampo" Lamperti − vocals
- Andrea "Armo" Arminio − vocals, guitar
- Tommaso "Petta" Manzoni − vocals, keyboards, synthesizer

== Discography ==
=== Studio albums ===
List of studio albums with details and selected chart positions
Title	Details	Peak chart positions
Title	Details	ITA
Rockabilly Carter	Released: 16 February 2023; Label: Virgin, Woodworm	47

=== Extended plays ===
List of EPs with details
Title	Details
Zafferano	Released: 14 January 2022; Label: Woodworm

=== Singles ===
List of singles as lead artist, with selected chart positions, showing year released and album name
Title	Year	Peak chart positions	Album
Title	Year	ITA	Album
"Bibite"	2019	—	Non-album singles
"Americana"	2019	—	Non-album singles
"Fuori il petto"	2019	—	Non-album singles
"Straintra"	2019	—	Non-album singles
"Gremolada"	2021	—	Zafferano
"Solo la notte"	2021	—	Zafferano
"Ci rimango male quando sei puntuale"	2022	—	Rockabilly Carter
"Chiara" (featuring Selton)	2022	—	Rockabilly Carter
"Tanto piove"	2022	—	Rockabilly Carter
"Asfalto"	2022	—	Rockabilly Carter
"Non mi va"	2023	25	Rockabilly Carter
"In fondo al blu"	2023	—	Non-album singles
