= Will (singer) =

Italian singer-songwriter (born 1999)

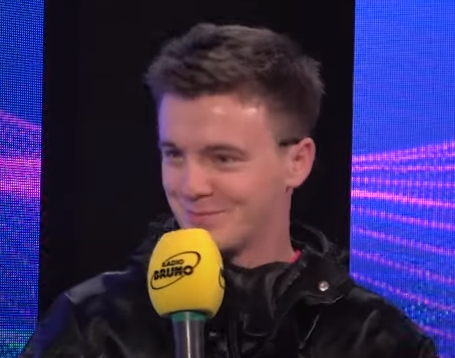
- Will (2023)

Background information
- Also known as: Will Buse
- Born: William Busetti; 17 August 1999 (age 27); Vittorio Veneto, Veneto, Italy
- Genre: Pop
- Occupations: Singer; songwriter
- Instrument: Vocals
- Years active: 2019–present
- Labels: Capitol Records; Universal Music Group

William Busetti (born 17 August 1999), known professionally as Will or Will Buse, is an Italian singer-songwriter.

== Biography ==
Busetti was born in Vittorio Veneto, and then grew up in Treviso. He began his career in 2019, when he started posting his first songs on YouTube. On 14 February 2020, he independently released his debut single "Rosso", which was followed by the singles "Prima sera" and "Fiori nel deserto".

In 2020, he took part in the fourteenth edition of the Italian talent show X Factor, entering the Boys 16-24 category, under the guidance of mentor Emma Marrone. Despite being eliminated during Bootcamp, the single "Estate", previously performed during the auditions, is subsequently certified platinum for more than 100 000 units sold in Italy.

On 10 June 2022, after signing a record deal with Capitol Records, Busetti released his debut EP Chi sono veramente, from which the single "Più forte di me" was extracted.

In November 2022, Busetti was one of 12 acts selected to compete in Sanremo Giovani, a televised competition aimed at selecting six newcomers as contestants of the 73rd Sanremo Music Festival. Will manage to qualify in the top six, with his entry "Le cose più importanti", by rightfully accessing the festival in the Campioni category. "Stupido" was later announced as his entry for the Sanremo Music Festival 2023.

== Discography ==
=== Albums ===
List of albums with details
Title	Album details	Peak chart positions
Title	Album details	ITA
Manchester	Released: 9 February 2023; Label: Capitol	60

=== Extended plays ===
List of EPs with details
Title	EP details
Chi sono veramente	Released: 10 June 2022; Label: Capitol

=== Singles ===
List of singles as lead artist, with selected chart positions, showing year released and album name
Title	Year	Peak chart positions	Certifications	Album
Title	Year	ITA	Certifications	Album
"Rosso"	2020	—		Non-album singles
"Prima sera"	2020	—		Non-album singles
"Fiore del deserto"	2020	—		Non-album singles
"Estate"	2020	47	FIMI: Platinum	Chi sono veramente
"Bella uguale"	2021	—		Non-album single
"Domani che fai"	2022	—		Chi sono veramente
"Anno luce"	2022	—		Chi sono veramente
"Più forte di me"	2022	—		Manchester
"Le cose più importanti"	2022	—		Manchester
"Stupido"	2023	37		Manchester
"Cosa mi fai"	2026	74		Non-album single

==== As featured artist ====
List of singles, with album name
Title	Year	Album
ITA
"Dopo di te" (Origvmi featuring Will)	2020	Non-album singles
"Tattoo 2" (DePe featuring Will)	2020	Non-album singles
"Non siamo uguali" (Alex Mav & Janax featuring Will and Astra)	2020	Non-album singles

== Television ==
- X Factor (Sky Uno, 2020) Contestant
- Sanremo Giovani 2022 (Rai 1, 2022) Contestant - Finalist
