= Supereroi (Mr. Rain song) =

2023 single by Mr. Rain

Single by Mr. Rain

from the album Pianeta di Miller
- Language: Italian
- Released: 8 February 2023
- Genre: Pop
- Length: 3:15
- Label: Warner Music Italy
- Songwriters: Mattia "Mr.Rain" Balardi; Federica Abbate; Lorenzo Vizzini

Mr.Rain singles chronology
"Sincero" (2022)	"Supereroi" (2023)	"La fine del mondo" (2023)

Music video
- "Supereroi" on YouTube

"Supereroi" (transl. "Superheroes") is a song co-written and recorded by Italian singer Mr. Rain, released as the lead single from his album Pianeta di Miller. The song was the artist's entry for the 73rd edition of the Sanremo Music Festival, and placed third in a field of 28. An autobiographical song about Mr. Rain's two years struggle with depression, it peaked at number two on the Italian singles chart, and was certified five times platinum.

== Charts ==
=== Weekly charts ===
Weekly chart performance for "Supereroi"
Chart (2023)	Peak position
Global 200 (Billboard)	95
Italy (FIMI)	2
Italy Airplay (EarOne)	5
Switzerland (Schweizer Hitparade)	6

=== Year-end charts ===
Year-end chart performance for "Supereroi"
Chart (2023)	Position
Italy (FIMI)	3

== Certifications ==
Region	Certification	Certified units/sales
Italy (FIMI)	6× Platinum	600,000^{‡}
^{‡} Sales+streaming figures based on certification alone.
