= Sethu (singer) =

Italian singer and rapper (born 1997)

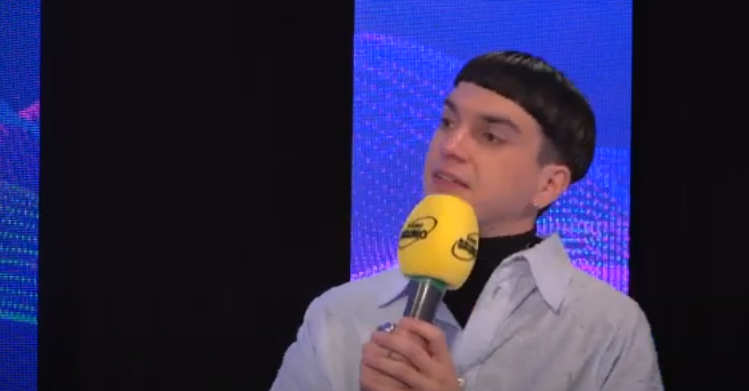
- Sethu (2023)

Background information
- Born: Marco De Lauri; 21 November 1997 (age 28); Savona, Liguria, Italy
- Genres: Hip hop; alternative rock
- Occupations: Singer; rapper
- Instrument: Vocals
- Years active: 2018–present
- Label: Carosello Records

Marco De Lauri (born 21 November 1997) known professionally as Sethu is an Italian singer and rapper.

== Biography ==
De Lauri was born in Savona and then, together with his twin brother, later settled in Milan. He showed an immediate interest in music from an early age, starting to perform in various local punk bands before devoting himself entirely to hip hop music. The pseudonym he uses is an homage to the album At the Gate of Sethu by the death metal band Nile.

In 2018 he released his debut EP Spero ti renda triste..., in collaboration with his twin brother Giorgio De Lauri, known professionally as Jiz. The EP deviated from his previous works by being influenced by genres such as trap music.

In 2019, the release of singles such as "Butterfly Knife" and "Hotspot", which enabled the artist to achieve national notoriety, allowed Sethu to be included in the "CBCR of the Year" list compiled by Italian magazine RockIT.

In September 2022, after obtaining a contract with Carosello Records, he released the single "Giro di notte", with which he was named "Artist of the Month" in the MTV New Generation. In November of the same year, De Lauri was one of 12 acts selected to compete in Sanremo Giovani, a televised competition aimed at selecting six newcomers as contestants of the 73rd Sanremo Music Festival. Sethu manage to qualify in the top six, with his entry "Sottoterra", by rightfully accessing the festival in the Campioni category. "Cause perse" was later announced as his entry for the Sanremo Music Festival 2023. Sethu finished last, in 28th position at Sanremo.

== Discography ==
=== Extended plays ===
List of EPs with details
Title	EP details	Peak chart positions
Title	EP details	ITA
Spero ti renda triste... (with Jiz)	Released: 16 November 2018; Label: Independent	—
Cause perse (with Jiz)	Released: 11 February 2023; Label: Carosello Records	—

=== Singles ===
Title	Year	Peak chart positions	Certifications	Album
Title	Year	ITA	Certifications	Album
"Baleka" (with ArnoSoul)	2018	—		Non-album singles
"Lampioni"	2019	—		Non-album singles
"Baleka" (with Rilah)	2019	—		Non-album singles
"Butterfly Knife"	2019	—		Non-album singles
"È uno scherzo ma feroce" (with Osiris and Prxmxnny)	2019	—		Non-album singles
"Hotspot" (with Lil $adape)	2019	—		Non-album singles
"Mi hai lasciato a metà strada, sulla strada di casa"	2019	—		Non-album singles
"Blacklist"	2020	—		Non-album singles
"Calmo"	2020	—		Non-album singles
"Pioverà per sempre?"	2020	—		Non-album singles
"Rebecca" (with Don Said featuring Arden e Jiz)	2021	—		Non-album singles
"Fu*ked Up" (with Tish)	2021	—		Non-album singles
"Qualcosa è andato storto" (with Iside)	2021	—		Non-album singles
"Crush" (with Wako)	2022	—		Non-album singles
"$exy delir*o" (with Meli and Snepper)	2022	—		Non-album singles
"Giro di notte"	2022	—		Non-album singles
"Sottoterra" (with Jiz)	2022	—		Non-album singles
"Cause perse" (with Jiz)	2023	33		Non-album singles
"Mare di lacrime" (with Jiz)	2023	—		Non-album singles
"Rivoluzione" (with Jiz)	2023	—		Non-album singles

==== As featured artist ====
List of singles, with chart positions, album name and certifications
Title	Year	Peak chart positions	Certifications	Album
Title	Year	ITA	Certifications	Album
"Per salvarmi" (Alessioego featuring Sethu)	2019	—		Non-album singles
"Full Metal Clout" (NEO13, Slumpthinldle, Reakira and Karashф featuring Lil $adape and Sethu)	2020	—		Non-album singles
"Per Aspera Ad Astra" (Per Aspera Ad Astra and Kermit feat. Track Ivoire, Rione, Capozanarky, Dile, Sethu and 33 & Grizzly)	2020	—		Non-album singles
