= Tango (Tananai song) =

2023 single by Tananai

Single by Tananai

from the album Rave, eclissi
- Language: Italian
- Released: 9 February 2023
- Length: 3:29
- Label: Universal Music Group
- Songwriters: Tananai; Paolo Antonacci; Alessandro Raina; Davide Simonetta
- Producers: Tananai; Davide Simonetta

Tananai singles chronology
"Abissale" (2022)	"Tango" (2023)	"Un altro mondo" (2023)

Music video
- "Tango" on YouTube

"Tango" is a song by Italian singer-songwriter Tananai. It was written by Tananai, Paolo Antonacci, Alessandro Raina and Davide Simonetta, and produced by Tananai and Simonetta.

It was released by Universal Music Group on 9 February 2023 as the first single from the re-issue of Tananai's second album Rave, eclissi. The song was the artist's entry for the Sanremo Music Festival 2023, the 73rd edition of the Sanremo Music Festival, which also doubles as a selection of the act for the Eurovision Song Contest. He ended up at fifth in a field of 28.

== Lyrics ==
The song was inspired by the real story of a Ukrainian family from Smoline forced to separate because of the Russian invasion of Ukraine, with the husband called to the front while the wife and their 14-years old daughter moved to Italy as refugees.

== Music video ==
A music video for the song was directed by Olmo Parenti and features real images of the couple that inspired the song.

== Charts ==
=== Weekly charts ===
Weekly chart performance for "Tango"
Chart (2023)	Peak position
Italy (FIMI)	2
Italy Airplay (EarOne)	5
Switzerland (Schweizer Hitparade)	71

=== Year-end charts ===
2023 year-end chart performance for "Tango"
Chart (2023)	Position
Italy (FIMI)	5

2024 year-end chart performance for "Tango"
Chart (2024)	Position
Italy (FIMI)	62

== Certifications ==
Region	Certification	Certified units/sales
Italy (FIMI)	6× Platinum	600,000^{‡}
^{‡} Sales+streaming figures based on certification alone.
