= Tananai =

Italian singer-songwriter and record producer (born 1995)

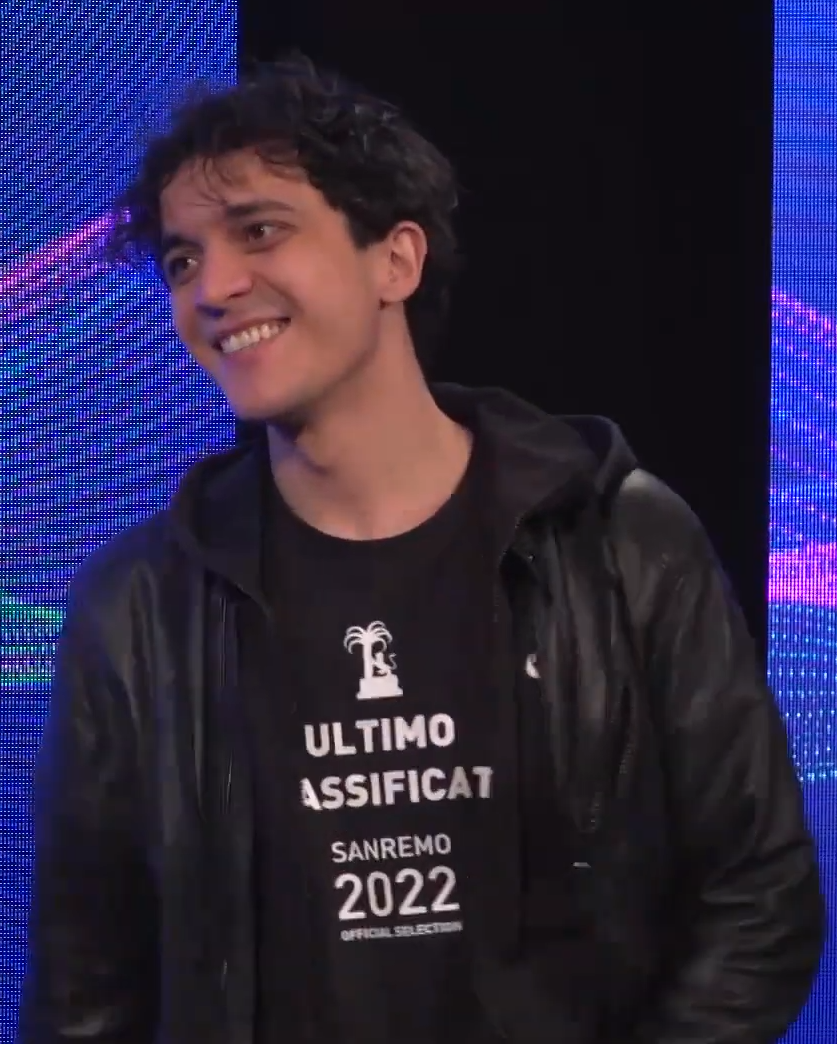
- Tananai in February 2023

Background information
- Born: Alberto Cotta Ramusino; 8 May 1995 (age 31); Milan, Italy
- Genres: Pop; indie pop; alternative hip hop
- Occupations: Singer-songwriter; record producer
- Instruments: Vocals; piano
- Works: Discography
- Years active: 2017–present
- Label: Universal Music Italia

Alberto Cotta Ramusino (born 8 May 1995), known professionally as Tananai, is an Italian singer-songwriter and record producer.

== Biography ==
Ramusino was born in Milan. His music career began in 2017, when he obtained a recording contract with the label Universal Music Italia, with whom he released his debut studio album To Discover and Forget under the pseudonym Not For Us.

After the publication of the first album, the artist began to perform under the pseudonym Tananai (derived, according to his own statements, from a slang Milanese word he was nicknamed with as a child, meaning "troublemaker") and began to work mainly on the musical production of songs in Italian. In 2019, he released the singles "Volersi male", "Bear Grylls", "Ichnusa" and "Calcutta". In January 2020, he released "Giugno", a single that anticipated the release of the debut EP entitled Piccoli boati, out on 21 February.

In March 2021, Tananai released the single "Baby Goddamn", followed by the single "Maleducazione" and the track "Le madri degli altri", included in the album Disumano by Italian rapper Fedez.

In November 2021, Tananai was one of 12 acts selected to compete in Sanremo Giovani, a televised competition aimed at selecting three newcomers as contestants of the 72nd Sanremo Music Festival. Tananai placed second during the show, with his entry "Esagerata", rightfully accessing the festival in the Campioni category. "Sesso occasionale" was later announced as his entry for the Sanremo Music Festival 2022. After Sanremo, his March 2021 single "Baby Goddamn" went viral on Spotify.

On 4 December 2022, it was officially announced once again his participation in the Sanremo Music Festival. "Tango" was later announced as his entry for the Sanremo Music Festival 2023.

== Discography ==
- To Discover and Forget (2017)
- Rave, eclissi (2022)
- CalmoCobra (2025)
