= Dimartino =

Italian singer-songwriter

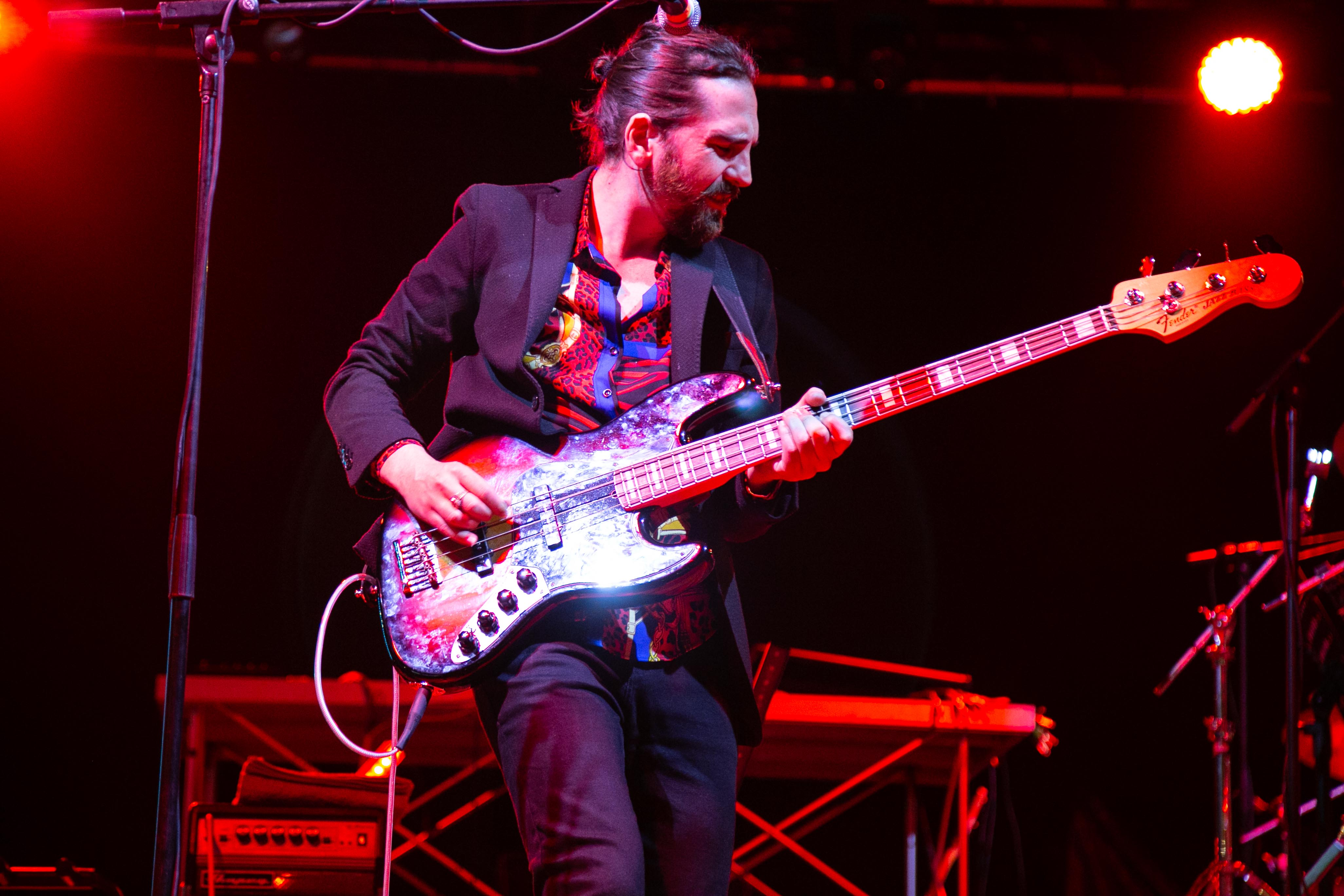

Background information
- Born: Antonio Di Martino; 1 December 1982 (age 43); Palermo, Sicily, Italy
- Genres: Indie pop
- Occupations: Singer; songwriter
- Years active: 2010–present

Antonio Di Martino (born 1 December 1982), known professionally as Dimartino, is an Italian singer-songwriter.

== Life and career ==
Born in Palermo, the son of a philosophy teacher and a carpenter, Di Martino started his career in 1998 as the founder and the lead singer of the band Famelika. The group disbanded in 2009, and he adopted the moniker Dimartino, releasing the album Cara maestra abbiamo perso in 2010. He was also active as a songwriter for other artists, including Brunori Sas (who co-produced his 2012 second album Sarebbe bello non lasciarsi mai, ma abbandonarsi ogni tanto è utile), Arisa, Marracash, Malika Ayane, Chiara Galiazzo, Levante and Dear Jack. In 2017, he made his literary debut with the novel Un mondo raro, about the life of singer Chavela Vargas.

He participated in Sanremo Music Festival 2021 with the song "Musica leggerissima", together with Colapesce, finishing in fourth place. On the third night of the contest they performed a cover of "Povera patria" by Franco Battiato. He took part at Sanremo Music Festival 2023, once again alongside Colapesce, with the song "Splash", winning the Mia Martini critics award and finishing in tenth place. On the fourth night of the contest the pair performed a cover of "Azzurro" with Carla Bruni.

== Colapesce Dimartino ==
Between 2020 and 2024, Dimartino had an artistic collaboration with the singer-songwriter Colapesce. The duo have released two studio albums together, plus a live album. They also starred in a road movie, La primavera della mia vita directed by Zavvo Nicolosi, for which they wrote the soundtrack. In 2024, they announced they were taking a break from their collaboration.

== Discography ==
=== Studio albums ===
- Cara maestra abbiamo perso (2010)
- Sarebbe bello non lasciarsi mai, ma abbandonarsi ogni tanto è utile (2012)
- Un paese ci vuole (2015)
- Un mondo raro (2017) with Fabrizio Cammarata
- Afrodite (2019)
- I mortali (2020) with Colapesce
- Lux Eterna Beach (2023) with Colapesce

=== Extended plays ===
- Non vengo più mamma (2013)

=== Soundtracks ===
- La primavera della mia vita (2023) with Colapesce

=== Live Albums ===
- Archi, ottoni e preoccupazione. Colapesce Dimartino dal vivo con l'orchestra (2024) with Colapesce
