= Ultimo discography =

Discography of Italian singer-songwriter Ultimo

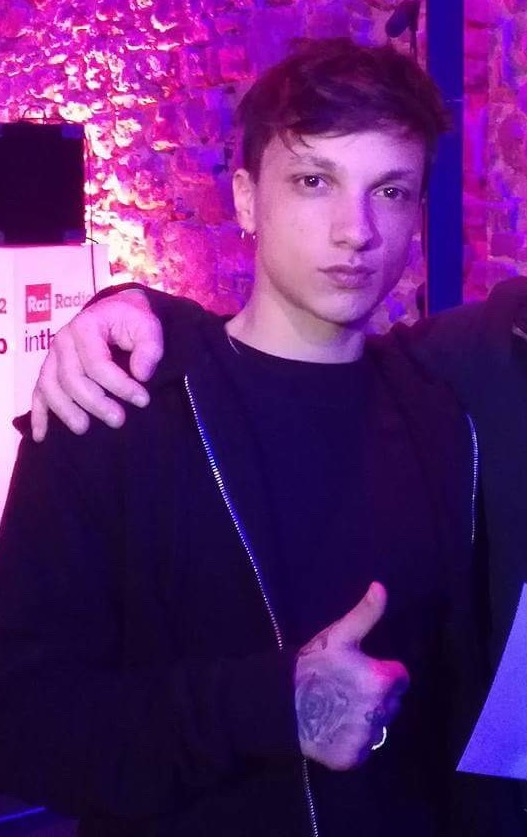
- Ultimo in 2018
- Studio albums: 7
- EPs: 1
- Live albums: 3
- Singles: 38

The discography of Italian singer-songwriter Ultimo consists of seven studio albums, three live albums, one EP and thirty-eight singles.

== Albums ==
=== Studio albums ===
List of studio albums, with chart positions and certifications
Title	Album details	Peak chart positions		Certifications
Title	Album details	ITA	SWI	Certifications
Pianeti	Released: 6 October 2017; Label: Honiro; Formats: CD, LP, digital download, streaming	5	—	FIMI: 4× Platinum
Peter Pan	Released: 9 February 2018; Label: Honiro; Formats: CD, LP, digital download, streaming	1	—	FIMI: 6× Platinum
Colpa delle favole	Released: 5 April 2019; Label: Honiro; Formats: CD, LP, digital download, streaming	1	21	FIMI: 6× Platinum
Solo	Released: 22 October 2021; Label: Ultimo Records; Formats: CD, LP, digital download, streaming	1	12	FIMI: 3× Platinum
Alba	Released: 17 February 2023; Label: Ultimo Records; Formats: CD, LP, digital download, streaming	1	5	FIMI: 3× Platinum
Altrove	Released: 17 May 2024; Label: Ultimo Records; Formats: CD, LP, digital download, streaming	1	8	FIMI: 2× Platinum
Il giorno che aspettavo	Released: 19 June 2026; Label: Ultimo Records; Formats: CD, LP, digital download, streaming	1	26	FIMI: Platinum
"—" denotes a recording that did not chart or was not released.

=== Live albums ===
List of live albums, with chart positions and certifications
Title	Album details	Peak chart positions	Certifications
Title	Album details	ITA	Certifications
Ultimo Live Stadi 2024	Released: 23 May 2025; Label: Ultimo Records; Formats: 2 CD, 4 LP, download, streaming	1	FIMI: Platinum
Ultimo Live Stadi 2025	Released: 5 December 2025; Label: Ultimo Records; Formats: 2 CD, 3 LP, download, streaming	1	FIMI: Gold
Ultimo Live Tor Vergata	Released: 13 November 2026; Label: Ultimo Records; Formats: 3 CD, 4 LP, download, streaming	2	

== Extended plays ==
List of EPs and with selected chart positions
Title	EP details	Peak chart positions
Title	EP details	ITA
Ultimo Live Stadi 2023	Released: 21 July 2023; Label: Ultimo Records; Format: digital download, streaming	46

== Singles ==
=== As lead artist ===
List of singles, with chart positions and certifications, showing year released and album name
Title	Year	Peak chart positions		Certifications	Album or EP
Title	Year	ITA	SWI	Certifications	Album or EP
"Osg16" (with Comagatte, Eden, Young Slash, Xfetto, Kayler, Nese Ikaro, Il Tre and Evrint Bless)	2017	—	—		Non-album single
"Chiave"	2017	—	—		Pianeti
"Ovunque tu sia"	2017	—	—	FIMI: Platinum	Pianeti
"Sabbia"	2017	—	—	FIMI: Platinum	Pianeti
"Pianeti"	2017	20	—	FIMI: 4× Platinum	Pianeti
"Stasera"	2017	—	—	FIMI: Gold	Pianeti
"Il ballo delle incertezze"	2017	6	—	FIMI: 3× Platinum	Peter Pan
"Poesia senza veli"	2018	20	—	FIMI: 2× Platinum	Peter Pan
"Cascare nei tuoi occhi"	2018	6	—	FIMI: 3× Platinum	Peter Pan
"Ti dedico il silenzio"	2018	22	—	FIMI: 3× Platinum	Peter Pan
"I tuoi particolari"	2019	2	48	FIMI: 4× Platinum	Colpa delle favole
"Fateme cantà"	2019	12	—	FIMI: Gold	Colpa delle favole
"Rondini al guinzaglio"	2019	5	—	FIMI: 3× Platinum	Colpa delle favole
"Ipocondria"	2019	23	—	FIMI: Platinum	Colpa delle favole
"Piccola stella"	2019	12	—	FIMI: 5× Platinum	Colpa delle favole
"Quando fuori piove"	2019	20	—	FIMI: Gold	Colpa delle favole
"Tutto questo sei tu"	2019	1	—	FIMI: 2× Platinum	Solo
"22 settembre"	2020	3	—	FIMI: 2× Platinum	Solo
"7+3"	2020	21	—	FIMI: Platinum	Solo
"Buongiorno vita"	2021	2	—	FIMI: 2× Platinum	Solo
"Niente"	2021	8	—	FIMI: Platinum	Solo
"Supereroi"	2021	66	—	FIMI: Gold	Solo
"Vieni nel mio cuore"	2021	23	—	FIMI: 4× Platinum	Alba
"Ti va di stare bene"	2022	12	—	FIMI: Platinum	Alba
"Alba"	2023	9	56	FIMI: 2× Platinum	Alba
"Nuvole in testa"	2023	77	—	FIMI: Gold	Alba
"Occhi lucidi"	2023	10	—	FIMI: Gold	Altrove
"L'ultima poesia" (with Geolier)	2024	1	72	FIMI: 4× Platinum	Dio lo sa
"Altrove"	2024	13	—	FIMI: Platinum	Altrove
"Neve al sole"	2024	38	—	FIMI: Gold	Altrove
"La parte migliore di me"	2024	32	—		Ultimo Live Stadi 2024
"Bella davvero"	2025	6	—	FIMI: Platinum	Ultimo Live Stadi 2024
"Acquario"	2026	3	—	FIMI: Gold	Il giorno che aspettavo
"Questa insensata voglia di te"	2026	25	—		Il giorno che aspettavo
"Romantica"	2026	3	—	FIMI: Gold	Il giorno che aspettavo
"Tutto"	2026	7	—		Non-album single
"—" denotes a single that did not chart or was not released.

=== As featured artist ===
List of singles as featured artist, with selected chart positions, showing year released and album name
Title	Year	Peak chart positions	Certifications	Album
Title	Year	ITA	Certifications	Album
"L'eternità (il mio quartiere)" (Fabrizio Moro featuring Ultimo)	2018	71	FIMI: Gold	Non-album single
"Tenebre" (Sercho featuring Ultimo)	2018	—		Temporale
"2step" (Ed Sheeran featuring Ultimo)	2022	24	FIMI: Platinum	Non-album single
"—" denotes a single that did not chart or was not released.

== Other charted songs ==
List of other charted songs, showing year released and album name
Title	Year	Peak chart positions	Certifications	Album
Title	Year	ITA	Certifications	Album
"Racconterò di te"	2017	—	FIMI: Gold	Pianeti
"Sogni appesi"	2017	39	FIMI: 2× Platinum	Pianeti
"Giusy"	2017	—	FIMI: Platinum	Pianeti
"L'unica forza che ho"	2017	—	FIMI: Platinum	Pianeti
"L'eleganza delle stelle"	2017	—	FIMI: Gold	Pianeti
"La stella più fragile dell'universo"		61	FIMI: Platinum	Peter Pan
"Peter Pan (Vuoi volare con me?)"	2018	—	FIMI: Platinum	Peter Pan
"Buon viaggio"	2018	—	FIMI: Gold	Peter Pan
"Farfalla bianca"	2018	—	FIMI: Platinum	Peter Pan
"Vorrei soltanto amarti"	2018	—	FIMI: Gold	Peter Pan
"Canzone stupida"	2018	—	FIMI: Gold	Peter Pan
"Dove il mare finisce"	2018	—	FIMI: Gold	Peter Pan
"Colpa delle favole"	2019	11	FIMI: Gold	Colpa delle favole
"Amati sempre"	2019	16	FIMI: Platinum	Colpa delle favole
"Quella casa che avevamo in mente"	2019	26	FIMI: Gold	Colpa delle favole
"La stazione dei ricordi"	2019	29		Colpa delle favole
"Aperitivo grezzo"	2019	32		Colpa delle favole
"Il tuo nome (Comunque vada con te)"	2019	38		Colpa delle favole
"Fermo"	2019	43		Colpa delle favole
"Sul finale"	2021	19	FIMI: Platinum	Solo
"Solo"	2021	32	FIMI: Gold	Solo
"Il bambino che contava le stelle"	2021	35	FIMI: Gold	Solo
"Quel filo che ci unisce"	2021	38	FIMI: Platinum	Solo
"Spari sul petto"	2021	53		Solo
"Isolamento"	2021	62		Solo
"La finestra di Greta"	2021	74		Solo
"Non sapere mai dove si va"	2021	92		Solo
"Quei ragazzi"	2021	100		Solo
"Equilibrio mentale - Home Piano Session"	2022	66		Solo - Home Piano Session
"Tutto diventa normale"	2023	96		Alba
"Amare"	2023	97		Alba
"Paura mai"	2023	77		Ultimo Live Stadi 2023
"Quei due innamorati"	2024	76		Altrove
"Lunedì"	2024	82		Altrove
"Quando saremo vecchi"	2024	91		Altrove
"—" denotes a single that did not chart or was not released.

== Other album appearances ==
List of other guest appearances, with other performing artists, showing year released and album name
Title	Year	Artist(s)	Album
"Ricco e sobrio"	2017	Tucano feat. Ultimo	Fuga dalla calma
"E fumo ancora"	2018	Mostro feat. Ultimo	Ogni maledetto giorno - Inferno edition
"Roma capoccia – Live"	2019	Antonello Venditti feat. Ultimo	Sotto il segno dei pesci - The Anniversary Tour (Live)
"Un'emozione per sempre"	2025	Eros Ramazzotti feat. Ultimo	Una storia importante

== Writing credits ==
List of songs written for other artists
Title	Year	Artist	Album
"Risparmio un sogno"	2018	Bianca Atzei	Non-album single
"L'odore del caffè"	2019	Francesco Renga	L'altra metà
"Chissà da dove arriva una canzone"	2020	Fiorella Mannoia	Padroni di niente
"Non lasciare le mie mani"	2023	A Christmas Magic	A Christmas Magic
"Te ne vai"	2026	Mara Sattei	Che me ne faccio del tempo
