= Ultimo Live Stadi 2024 =

Live album by Ultimo
- Released: 23 May 2025
- Recorded: 2024
- Genre: Pop; pop rock
- Length: 130:27
- Label: Ultimo Records
- Producer: Ultimo; Riccardo Zangirolami

Ultimo chronology
Altrove (2024)	Ultimo Live Stadi 2024 (2025)	Ultimo Live Stadi 2025 (2025)

Singles from Ultimo Live Stadi 2024 (Live)
- 1. "La parte migliore di me" Released: 27 November 2024; 2. "Bella davvero" Released: 18 April 2025

Ultimo Live Stadi 2024 is the first live album by Italian singer-songwriter Ultimo. It was released on 23 May 2025 by Ultimo Records.

== Background and description ==
Following the release of his sixth studio album, Altrove, the singer-songwriter embarked on the Ultimo Stadi 2024 - La favola continua... tour, with musical direction by Andrea Rigonat. At the conclusion of the tour on 6 July at the Stadio Euganeo in Padua, 412,884 tickets were sold across the ten dates.

On 28 April 2025 the singer-songwriter announced the release of his first live album for 23 May. The album was made available digitally and in physical versions of a double CD and a quadruple vinyl. In addition to the songs performed during the concerts, the album features the singles "La parte migliore di me" and "Bella davvero".

== Reception ==
Paolo Panzeri of Rockol describes the project as "a public diary", finding in the songs "even more depth, giving those present moments of liberation, if not pure catharsis".

== Track listing ==
Ultimo Live Stadi 2024 (Live) track listing
No.	Title	Medley	Length
1.	"Bella davvero"		2:59
2.	"Intro + Il capolavoro" (Live Stadi 2024)		3:43
3.	"Sono pazzo di te" (Live Stadi 2024)		3:44
4.	"Quando fuori piove" (Live Stadi 2024)		3:39
5.	"Il ballo delle incertezze" (Live Stadi 2024)		3:24
6.	"Ti va di stare bene" (Live Stadi 2024)		3:47
7.	"Tutto questo sei tu" (Live Stadi 2024)		4:20
8.	"Ipocondria" (Live Stadi 2024)		4:25
9.	"Paura mai" (Live Stadi 2024)		3:54
10.	"Rondini al guinzaglio" (Live Stadi 2024)		4:03
11.	"Racconterò di te" (Live Stadi 2024)		3:53
12.	"Quel filo che ci unisce" (Live Stadi 2024)		4:20
13.	"Ti dedico il silenzio" (Live Stadi 2024)		3:59
14.	"Nuvole in testa" (Live Stadi 2024)		3:08
15.	"Amati sempre" (Live Stadi 2024)		8:06
16.	"Occhi lucidi" (Live Stadi 2024)		3:33
17.	"Neve al sole" (Live Stadi 2024)		3:24
18.	"Quei due innamorati" (Live Stadi 2024)		3:56
19.	"Lunedì" (Live Stadi 2024)		3:43
20.	"Altrove" (Live Stadi 2024)		3:37
21.	"Medley piano e voce" (Live Stadi 2024)	I tuoi particolari, Fateme cantà, La stella più fragile dell'universo, Wendy, Giusy, Buongiorno vita	14:27
22.	"Tornare a te" (Live Stadi 2024)		4:06
23.	"Piccola stella" (Live Stadi 2024)		3:56
24.	"Vieni nel mio cuore" (Live Stadi 2024)		4:32
25.	"Pianeti" (Live Stadi 2024)		3:47
26.	"Alba" (Live Stadi 2024)		3:37
27.	"La stazione dei ricordi + Le solite paure" (Live Stadi 2024)		4:12
28.	"22 settembre" (Live Stadi 2024)		4:22
29.	"Sogni appesi" (Live Stadi 2024)		8:42
30.	"La parte migliore di me"		3:21

== Commercial success ==
The album debuted at number one on the FIMI Album chart, becoming the first live album to achieve this result in the chart since 2019.

== Charts ==
=== Weekly charts ===
Weekly chart performance for Ultimo Live Stadi 2024 (Live)
Chart (2025)	Peak position
Italian Albums (FIMI)	1

=== Year-end charts ===
Year-end chart performance for Ultimo Live Stadi 2024 (Live)
Chart	Year	Position
Italian Albums (FIMI)	2025	17

== Certifications ==
Certifications for Ultimo Live Stadi 2024 (Live)
Region	Certification	Certified units/sales
Italy (FIMI)	Platinum	50,000^{‡}
^{‡} Sales+streaming figures based on certification alone.
