= Ultimo Live Stadi 2025 =

Live album by Ultimo
- Released: 5 December 2025
- Recorded: 2025
- Genre: Pop; pop rock
- Length: 124:43
- Label: Ultimo Records
- Producer: Ultimo; Juli

Ultimo chronology
Ultimo Live Stadi 2024 (Live) (2025)	Ultimo Live Stadi 2025 (2025)

Ultimo Live Stadi 2025 is the second live album by Italian singer-songwriter Ultimo. It was released on 5 December 2025 by Ultimo Records.

== Background and description ==
Following the release of his first live album, Ultimo Live Stadi 2024 (Live), the singer-songwriter embarked on a summer stadium tour, Ultimo Stadi 2025 - La favola continua..., during which he performed the album's thirty songs.

On 18 November 2025 the singer-songwriter announced the release of his second live album for 5 December. The album was made available digitally and in physical versions of a double CD and triple vinyl.

== Track listing ==
Ultimo Live Stadi 2025 track listing
No.	Title	Medley	Length
1.	"Intro + Dove finisce il mare" (Live Stadi 2025)		5:11
2.	"Colpa delle favole" (Live Stadi 2025)		2:24
3.	"Quei ragazzi" (Live Stadi 2025)		3:31
4.	"Quando saremo vecchi" (Live Stadi 2025)		3:12
5.	"Buongiorno vita" (Live Stadi 2025)		2:57
6.	"L'unica forza che ho" (Live Stadi 2025)		4:09
7.	"Amati sempre" (Live Stadi 2025)		5:18
8.	"Ipocondria" (Live Stadi 2025)		4:18
9.	"Sul finale" (Live Stadi 2025)		3:36
10.	"Rondini al guinzaglio" (Live Stadi 2025)		4:03
11.	"Giusy" (Live Stadi 2025)		3:32
12.	"Medley" (Live Stadi 2025)	Tutto diventa normale, Quella casa che avevamo in mente, Paura mai	4:27
13.	"L'eleganza delle stelle + Occhi lucidi" (Live Stadi 2025)		3:36
14.	"I tuoi particolari" (Live Stadi 2025)		4:12
15.	"Peter Pan" (Live Stadi 2025)		6:36
16.	"Il bambino che contava le stelle" (Live Stadi 2025)		3:15
17.	"Ti va di stare bene" (Live Stadi 2025)		3:44
18.	"Piccola stella" (Live Stadi 2025)		3:56
19.	"La stella più fragile dell'universo" (Live Stadi 2025)		3:49
20.	"Quel filo che ci unisce" (Live Stadi 2025)		4:20
21.	"Bella davvero" (Live Stadi 2025)		4:38
22.	"Ti dedico il silenzio" (Live Stadi 2025)		4:21
23.	"Pianeti - Piano e voce" (Live Stadi 2025)		4:38
24.	"Alba - Piano e voce" (Live Stadi 2025)		3:26
25.	"La parte migliore di me - Piano e voce" (Live Stadi 2025)		3:39
26.	"Il ballo delle incertezze" (Live Stadi 2025)		3:25
27.	"Vieni nel mio cuore" (Live Stadi 2025)		3:56
28.	"Altrove" (Live Stadi 2025)		4:39
29.	"22 settembre" (Live Stadi 2025)		3:23
30.	"Sogni appesi" (Live Stadi 2025)		8:32

== Commercial success ==
The album debuted at number one on the FIMI Album chart, becoming the artist's second live album to achieve this result in the same year after the previous Ultimo Live Stadi 2024.

== Charts ==
Weekly chart performance for Ultimo Live Stadi 2025
Chart (2025)	Peak position
Italian Albums (FIMI)	1

== Certifications ==
Certifications for Ultimo Live Stadi 2025
Region	Certification	Certified units/sales
Italy (FIMI)	Gold	25,000^{‡}
^{‡} Sales+streaming figures based on certification alone.
