= List of number-one hits of 2019 (Italy) =

This is a list of the number-one hits of 2019 on Italy's Singles and Albums Charts, ranked by the Federazione Industria Musicale Italiana (FIMI).

== Chart history ==
Week	Issue date	Song	Artist(s)	Ref.	Album	Artist(s)	Ref.
1	4 January	"Il cielo nella stanza"	Salmo featuring Nstasia		Playlist	Salmo	
2	11 January	"È sempre bello"	Coez		Playlist	Salmo	
3	18 January	"Stamm fort"	Luchè featuring Sfera Ebbasta		Playlist	Salmo	
4	25 January	"TVTB"	Fedez featuring Dark Polo Gang		Paranoia Airlines	Fedez	
5	1 February	"È sempre bello"	Coez		Paranoia Airlines	Fedez	
6	8 February	"Soldi"	Mahmood		Giovani per sempre	Irama	
7	15 February	"Soldi"	Mahmood		Peter Pan	Ultimo	
8	22 February	"Soldi"	Mahmood		Gioventù bruciata	Mahmood	
9	1 March	"Soldi"	Mahmood		Re Mida	Lazza	
10	8 March	"Soldi"	Mahmood		Start	Ligabue	
11	15 March	"Soldi"	Mahmood		Start	Ligabue	
12	22 March	"Con Calma"	Daddy Yankee featuring Snow		Dove gli occhi non arrivano	Rkomi	
13	29 March	"È sempre bello"	Coez		È sempre bello	Coez	
14	5 April	"Calma" (Remix)	Pedro Capó and Farruko		Colpa delle favole	Ultimo	
15	12 April	"Calma" (Remix)	Pedro Capó and Farruko		Colpa delle favole	Ultimo	
16	19 April	"Calma" (Remix)	Pedro Capó and Farruko		Colpa delle favole	Ultimo	
17	26 April	"Calipso"	Charlie Charles and Dardust featuring Sfera Ebbasta, Mahmood and Fabri Fibra		Colpa delle favole	Ultimo	
18	3 May	"Calipso"	Charlie Charles and Dardust featuring Sfera Ebbasta, Mahmood and Fabri Fibra		Colpa delle favole	Ultimo	
19	10 May	"I Don't Care"	Ed Sheeran and Justin Bieber		Aletheia	Izi	
20	17 May	"Calipso"	Charlie Charles and Dardust featuring Sfera Ebbasta, Mahmood and Fabri Fibra		Aletheia	Izi	
21	24 May	"Calipso"	Charlie Charles and Dardust featuring Sfera Ebbasta, Mahmood and Fabri Fibra		Solo	Alberto Urso	
22	31 May	"Ostia Lido"	J-Ax		Solo	Alberto Urso	
23	7 June	"Veleno 7"	Gemitaiz and Madman		Jova Beach Party	Jovanotti	
24	14 June	"Ostia Lido"	J-Ax		Western Stars	Bruce Springsteen	
25	21 June	"Jambo"	Takagi & Ketra, Omi and Giusy Ferreri		Western Stars	Bruce Springsteen	
26	28 June	"Jambo"	Takagi & Ketra, Omi and Giusy Ferreri		Potere (Il giorno dopo)	Luchè	
27	5 July	"Ho paura di uscire 2"	Machete, Salmo and Lazza		Machete Mixtape 4	Machete Crew	
28	12 July	"Yoshi"	Machete, Dani Faiv and Tha Supreme featuring Fabri Fibra		Machete Mixtape 4	Machete Crew	
29	19 July	"Señorita"	Shawn Mendes and Camila Cabello		Machete Mixtape 4	Machete Crew	
30	26 July	"Dove e quando"	Benji & Fede		Machete Mixtape 4	Machete Crew	
31	2 August	"Una volta ancora"	Fred De Palma featuring Ana Mena		Machete Mixtape 4	Machete Crew	
32	9 August	"Una volta ancora"	Fred De Palma featuring Ana Mena		Machete Mixtape 4	Machete Crew	
33	16 August	"Una volta ancora"	Fred De Palma featuring Ana Mena		Machete Mixtape 4	Machete Crew	
34	23 August	"Una volta ancora"	Fred De Palma featuring Ana Mena		Machete Mixtape 4	Machete Crew	
35	30 August	"Una volta ancora"	Fred De Palma featuring Ana Mena		Libertà	Rocco Hunt	
36	6 September	"Una volta ancora"	Fred De Palma featuring Ana Mena		Ricercato	Junior Cally	
37	13 September	"Yoshi" (Remix)	Machete, Dani Faiv and J Balvin featuring Tha Supreme, Fabri Fibra and Capo Plaza		Mattoni	Night Skinny	
38	20 September	"Una volta ancora"	Fred De Palma featuring Ana Mena		Scatola nera	Gemitaiz and MadMan	
39	27 September	"Una volta ancora"	Fred De Palma featuring Ana Mena		Scatola nera	Gemitaiz and MadMan	
40	4 October	"Gigolò"	Lazza and Sfera Ebbasta featuring Capo Plaza		Zero il folle	Renato Zero	
41	11 October	"Dance Monkey"	Tones and I		Voglio essere tua	Giordana Angi	
42	18 October	"Dance Monkey"	Tones and I		Good Vibes	Benji & Fede	
43	25 October	"Dance Monkey"	Tones and I		Fortuna	Emma	
44	1 November	"Supreme (l'ego)"	Marracash, Tha Supreme and Sfera Ebbasta		Persona	Marracash	
45	8 November	"Blun7 a Swishland"	Tha Supreme		Persona	Marracash	
46	15 November	"Blun7 a Swishland"	Tha Supreme		23 6451	Tha Supreme	
47	22 November	"Blun7 a Swishland"	Tha Supreme		Accetto miracoli	Tiziano Ferro	
48	29 November	"Blun7 a Swishland"	Tha Supreme		Cremonini 2C2C: The Best Of	Cesare Cremonini	
49	6 December	"Blun7 a Swishland"	Tha Supreme		Vasco Nonstop Live	Vasco Rossi	
50	13 December	"Tutto questo sei tu"	Ultimo		Accetto miracoli	Tiziano Ferro	
51	20 December	"Blun7 a Swishland"	Tha Supreme		Accetto miracoli	Tiziano Ferro	
52	27 December	"Blun7 a Swishland"	Tha Supreme		23 6451	Tha Supreme	

== See also ==
- 2019 in music
- List of number-one hits in Italy
