= Tommaso Novi =

Tomasso Novi, also known by the pseudonym Novi, is an Italian pianist, singer-songwriter and whistler.

== Early life ==
He was born in Pisa, Italy on 13 July 1979 as one of 10 siblings. Most of his siblings also played piano. He is a self taught whistler since he was a boy at age 5, describing whistling as one of his many tics. At age 7, Novi studied piano. Novi would whistle with classmates and while swimming growing up.

He studied at the Conservatory of Music in La Spezia and then at the Cherubini Conservatory in Florence.

== Career ==
He holds the first and only official chair of musical whistling (in English Art-Whistling ) at the Luigi Cherubini Conservatory in Florence. He has recorded his whistling on the soundtracks of several feature films such as La prima cosa bella by Paolo Virzì and Una festa esagerata by Vincenzo Salemme, working alongside maestro Nicola Piovani.

=== With the Half Cats ===
In 2005, together with Francesco Bottai, he co-founded the group "Gatti Mézzi" (Half Cats in English) with which he released six albums and received awards such as a Ciampi Award, finalist for the Tenco Award, a nomination for the Nastri d'Argento with the song Morirò d'incidente stradale, and a Forte dei Marmi satire award.

=== Solo work ===
In 2017 he embarked on a solo career by publishing the album Se mi copri rollo al volo using only the surname Novi and continuing to write and compose jazz music.

He has worked with Dario Fo, Paolo Fresu, Stefano Bollani, Gipi, Ascanio Celestini, The Zen Circus, Bandabardò and Bobo Rondelli.

== Discography ==
=== With the Half Cats ===
==== Studio albums ====
- 2006 – Anco alle puce ni viene la tosse (autoprodotto)
- 2007 – Amori e fortori (autoprodotto)
- 2009 – Struscioni (Sam)
- 2011 – Berve fra le berve (Sam)
- 2013 – Vestiti leggeri (Picicca Dischi)
- 2016 – Perché hanno sempre quella faccia (Picicca Dischi)

=== Solo work ===
==== Studio albums ====
- 2017 – Se mi copri rollo al volo (Vrec)
- 2021 – Terzino fuorigioco (Blackcandy)
