= Solo (Ultimo album) =

2021 studio album by Ultimo

Studio album by Ultimo
- Released: 22 October 2021
- Studio: Enemies Lab, Rome (Italy); Auditoria Records, Fino Mornasco (Italy)
- Genre: Pop
- Length: 58:39
- Label: Ultimo Records
- Producer: Ultimo; Diego Calvetti; Enemies; Federico Nardelli

Ultimo chronology
Colpa delle favole (2019)	Solo (2021)	Alba (2023)

Singles from Solo
- 1. "Vieni nel mio cuore" Released: 25 May 2022; 2. "Ti va di stare bene" Released: 28 October 2022; 3. "Alba" Released: 8 February 2023; 4. "Nuvole in testa" Released: 24 March 2023

Solo (transl. Alone) is the fourth studio album by Italian singer-songwriter Ultimo, released on 22 October 2021 by Ultimo Records.

== Description ==
The album's title and cover art were revealed by the singer-songwriter on 22 September 2021, exactly one year after the release of the single "22 settembre", while the tracklist was released the following day. The album includes seventeen tracks, all written and composed by Ultimo in the two years prior to its release, except for "Sul finale", written in 2017. These include the singles "Tutto questo sei tu", released in 2019 and also reaching number one on the FIMI charts; "22 settembre" and "7+3", both released in 2020; and finally "Buongiorno vita" and " Niente", released in 2021. At the end of 2021, the song "Supereroi", the soundtrack to the film of the same name directed by Paolo Genovese, was also released as a single.

== Track listing ==
Solo track listing
No.	Title	Writer(s)	Producer(s)	Length
1.	"Il bambino che contava le stelle" (30 November 2019, 19:53)	Niccolò Moriconi	Federico Nardelli	2:27
2.	"Niente" (26 March 2020, 22:34)	Moriconi	Nardelli	3:58
3.	"Sul finale" (22 August 2017, 15:10)	Moriconi	Nardelli	3:54
4.	"Solo" (3 January 2021, 18:02)	Moriconi	Enemies	3:42
5.	"Spari sul petto" (25 March 2020, 00:51)	Moriconi	Enemies	3:10
6.	"Isolamento" (21 February 2021, 20:12)	Moriconi	Nardelli	3:01
7.	"Quel filo che ci unisce" (5 January 2021, 05:23, per J.)	Moriconi	Enemies	4:14
8.	"Supereroi" (25 October 2019, 23:49)	Moriconi	Enemies	4:23
9.	"La finestra di Greta" (7 May 2020, 03:15)	Moriconi	Nardelli	3:15
10.	"Buongiorno vita" (25 April 2020, 09:45)	Moriconi	Nardelli	3:10
11.	"Quei ragazzi" (8 July 2021, 10:28)	Moriconi	Enemies	3:25
12.	"Non sapere mai dove si va" (24 December 2019, 16:31)	Moriconi	Enemies	3:02
13.	"22 settembre" (21 December 2019, 12:34)	Moriconi	Nardelli	3:50
14.	"7+3" (20 November 2020, 22:58)	Moriconi	Enemies	3:34
15.	"Tutto questo sei tu" (19 August 2019, 15:44)	Moriconi	Diego Calvetti; Enemies	4:04
16.	"Non amo" (18 September 2020, 18:02)	Moriconi	Nardelli	2:43
17.	"2:43 AM" (12 March 2020, 02:43)	Moriconi	Ultimo	3:08
Total length:				58:38

== Charts ==
=== Weekly charts ===
Weekly chart performance for Solo
Chart (2024)	Peak position
Italian Albums (FIMI)	1
Swiss Albums (Schweizer Hitparade)	12

=== Year-end charts ===
Year-end chart performance for Solo
Chart	Year	Position
Italian Albums (FIMI)	2021	14
Italian Albums (FIMI)	2022	16
Italian Albums (FIMI)	2023	63
Italian Albums (FIMI)	2024	68

== Certifications ==
Certifications for Solo
Region	Certification	Certified units/sales
Italy (FIMI)	4× Platinum	200,000^{‡}
^{‡} Sales+streaming figures based on certification alone.

== Solo - Home Piano Session ==
Solo - Home Piano Session

Studio album by Ultimo
- Released: 25 March 2022
- Studio: Lake Como, Rome (Italy); Enemies Lab, Rome (Italy); Auditoria Records, Fino Mornasco (Italy)
- Genre: Pop
- Length: 1:23:22
- Label: Ultimo Records
- Producer: Ultimo; Diego Calvetti; Enemies; Federico Nardelli

On 25 March 2022, Solo - Home Piano Session was released, a reissue of the album Solo containing sixth tracks from the latter in an acoustic version for piano and voice, plus an unreleased song, "Equilibrio mentale", also in an acoustic version. All 7 tracks were recorded in July 2021 in a villa on Lake Como and were self-produced by Ultimo. The album was also released in a physical version in a limited edition of 5,000 copies with a double CD. The digital reissue includes the acoustic versions first (tracks 1–7) and then the studio versions (tracks 8–24).

=== Track listing ===
CD1
No.	Title	Writer(s)	Producer(s)	Length
1.	"Il bambino che contava le stelle" (30 November 2019, 19:53)	Niccolò Moriconi	Ultimo	2:27
2.	"Niente" (26 March 2020, 22:34)	Moriconi	Ultimo	3:58
3.	"Sul finale" (22 August 2017, 15:10)	Ultimo	Nardelli	3:54
4.	"Solo" (3 January 2021, 18:02)	Moriconi	Ultimo	3:42
5.	"Spari sul petto" (25 March 2020, 00:51)	Moriconi	Ultimo	3:10
6.	"Isolamento" (21 February 2021, 20:12)	Moriconi	Ultimo	3:01
7.	"Quel filo che ci unisce" (5 January 2021, 05:23, per J.)	Moriconi	Ultimo	4:14
8.	"Supereroi" (25 October 2019, 23:49)	Moriconi	Federico Nardelli	4:23
9.	"La finestra di Greta" (7 May 2020, 03:15)	Moriconi	Nardelli	3:15
10.	"Buongiorno vita" (25 April 2020, 09:45)	Moriconi	Nardelli	3:10
11.	"Quei ragazzi" (8 July 2021, 10:28)	Moriconi	Enemies	3:25
12.	"Non sapere mai dove si va" (24 December 2019, 16:31)	Moriconi	Enemies	3:02
13.	"22 settembre" (21 December 2019, 12:34)	Moriconi	Nardelli	3:50
14.	"7+3" (20 November 2020, 22:58)	Moriconi	Enemies	3:34
15.	"Tutto questo sei tu" (19 August 2019, 15:44)	Moriconi	Enemies	4:04
16.	"Non amo" (18 September 2020, 18:02)	Moriconi	Nardelli	2:43
17.	"2:43 AM" (12 March 2020, 02:43)	Moriconi	Nardelli	3:08
Total length:				58:38

CD2
No.	Title	Writer(s)	Producer(s)	Length
1.	"Equilibrio mentale" (Home Piano Session)	Moriconi	Enemies	3:35
2.	"Il bambino che contava le stelle" (Home Piano Session)	Moriconi	Enemies	2:31
3.	"Solo" (Home Piano Session)	Moriconi	Nardelli	3:35
4.	"Isolamento" (Home Piano Session)	Moriconi	Enemies	3:10
5.	"Niente" (Home Piano Session)	Moriconi	Enemies	3:43
6.	"Quel filo che ci unisce" (Home Piano Session)	Moriconi	Nardelli	4:12
7.	"Sul finale" (Home Piano Session)	Moriconi	Ultimo	3:57
Total length:				24:43
