= Alba (Ultimo album) =

Studio album by Ultimo
- Released: 17 February 2023
- Studios: Auditoria Records (Fino Mornasco); IlMotoreDellAuto! Studio (Fiumicello Villa Vicentina)
- Genre: Pop
- Length: 37:40
- Label: Ultimo Records
- Producers: Ultimo; Federico Nardelli; Andrea Rigonat; Matteo Nesi

Ultimo chronology
Solo (2021)	Alba (2023)	Altrove (2024)

Singles from Alba
- 1. "Vieni nel mio cuore" Released: 25 May 2022; 2. "Ti va di stare bene" Released: 28 October 2022; 3. "Alba" Released: 8 February 2023; 4. "Nuvole in testa" Released: 24 March 2023

Alba (transl. Sunrise) is the fifth studio album by Italian singer-songwriter Ultimo, released on 17 February 2023 by Ultimo Records.

The album was preceded by the singles "Vieni nel mio cuore", "Ti va di stare bene" and "Alba", which was presented in competition at the Sanremo Music Festival 2023, where it finished in fourth place.

== Description ==
The project consists of fourteen tracks, written and composed by the singer-songwriter himself with the participation in the production of Federico Nardelli, Andrea Rigonat and Matteo Nesi.

== Reception ==
Gabriele Fazio of Agenzia Giornalistica Italia states that the album represents "the boundary between style and inability to experiment," finding it "labile" and "indistinguishable" from previous projects, because "he has found a recipe, he has consciously chosen to constantly re-propose it, [...] as long as it works". Fazio emphasizes that musically, it is "simple and direct." Fazio writes that the singer works well with the "piano and voice" combination, although "damnedly repetitive," finding it "a total disaster" when he strays from these sounds.

Silvia Gianatti of Vanity Fair Italia writes that the project stems from "the need to show his world," although it lacks "a common thread" musically, with the exception of the piano, which remains "the protagonist of his compositions", with "care for the sound".

== Track listing ==
Alba track listing
No.	Title	Writer(s)	Producer(s)	Length
1.	"Alba"	Niccolò Moriconi	Ultimo; Federico Nardelli	3:30
2.	"Nuvole in testa"	Moriconi	Ultimo; Nardelli	3:14
3.	"Amare"	Moriconi	Ultimo; Andrea Rigonat	3:18
4.	"Tutto diventa normale"	Moriconi	Ultimo; Rigonat	3:16
5.	"Tu"	Moriconi	Ultimo; Nardelli	3:31
6.	"Vivo per vivere"	Moriconi	Ultimo; Rigonat	3:54
7.	"Ti va di stare bene"	Moriconi	Ultimo; Rigonat	3:33
8.	"Vieni nel mio cuore"	Moriconi	Ultimo; Nardelli	2:53
9.	"Sono pazzo di te"	Moriconi	Ultimo; Nardelli	3:41
10.	"Joker"	Moriconi	Ultimo; Rigonat	3:12
11.	"La pioggia di Londra"	Moriconi	Ultimo; Matteo Nesi	3:36
12.	"Tornare a te"	Moriconi	Ultimo; Nesi	3:55
13.	"Le solite paure"	Moriconi	Ultimo; Rigonat	2:53
14.	"Titoli di coda"	Moriconi	Ultimo; Nesi	3:34
Total length:				37:40

== Charts ==
=== Weekly charts ===
Weekly chart performance for Alba
Chart (2024)	Peak position
Italian Albums (FIMI)	1
Swiss Albums (Schweizer Hitparade)	5

=== Year-end charts ===
Year-end chart performance for Alba
Chart	Year	Position
Italian Albums (FIMI)	2023	10
Italian Albums (FIMI)	2024	80

== Certifications ==
Certifications for Alba
Region	Certification	Certified units/sales
Italy (FIMI)	3× Platinum	150,000^{‡}
^{‡} Sales+streaming figures based on certification alone.
