= Sanremo Music Festival 2019 =

Italian song contest (69th edition)

Dates and venue
- Semi-final 1: 5 February 2019
- Semi-final 2: 6 February 2019
- Semi-final 3: 7 February 2019
- Semi-final 4: 8 February 2019
- Final: 9 February 2019
- Venue: Teatro Ariston; Sanremo, Italy

Production
- Broadcaster: Radiotelevisione italiana (RAI)
- Director: Duccio Forzano
- Musical director: Geoff Westley
- Artistic director: Claudio Baglioni
- Presenters: Claudio Baglioni and Claudio Bisio, Virginia Raffaele

Big Artists section
- Number of entries: 24
- Voting system: Televoting, demoscopic voting, press jury, Expert Jury
- Winner: "Soldi"; Mahmood

The Sanremo Music Festival 2019 (Italian: Festival di Sanremo 2019), officially the 69th Italian Song Festival (69º Festival della canzone italiana), was the 69th annual Sanremo Music Festival, a television song contest held at the Teatro Ariston of Sanremo, organised and broadcast by Radiotelevisione italiana (RAI). The show was held between 5 February 2019 and 9 February 2019. Claudio Baglioni was the artistic director of the contest, and co-hosted it with Virginia Raffaele and Claudio Bisio.

24 entries competed in one section only, contrarily to previous editions which featured at least two sections. Mahmood emerged as the winner of the festival with his song "Soldi", earning the right to represent Italy in the Eurovision Song Contest 2019.

== Format ==
=== Presenters ===
Singer-songwriter and musician, Claudio Baglioni, who was also the competition's artistic director, hosted the Sanremo Music Festival for the second consecutive year, alongside co-hosts Claudio Bisio and Virginia Raffaele.

=== Voting ===
Voting during the five evenings occurred through different combinations of four methods:

- Public televoting, carried out via landline, mobile phone, the contest's official mobile app, and online voting.
- Press jury voting, expressed by accredited journalists that followed the competition from the Roof Hall at the Teatro Ariston.
- A demoscopic poll, composed of a sample of 300 music fans, which voted from their homes via an electronic voting system managed by Ipsos.
- Expert jury voting, resulting from points assigned by personalities from the world of music, entertainment and culture. The jury was composed by Mauro Pagani (president), Ferzan Özpetek, Camila Raznovich, Claudia Pandolfi, Elena Sofia Ricci, Beppe Severgnini, Serena Dandini and Joe Bastianich.

The three voting systems were distributed in the following percentages:

- First, Second and Third Evening: 40% Public televoting; 30% Demoscopic poll; 30% Press jury voting
- Fourth and Fifth Evening: 50% Public televoting; 30% Press jury voting; 20% Expert jury voting

In the final part of the fifth evening, a new rank indicating the first three acts -determined by the percentage of votes obtained in this evening's vote and those obtained in previous evenings- was drawn up.

== Selections ==
=== Ecco Sanremo Giovani ===
Unlike previous editions, the Newcomers' section was not included in the Festival, but a similar selection was held to decree the two places reserved in the Big Artist section. The artists competing in the new format were selected through two separate contests: Standard section and Area Sanremo. The selection was preceded by four afternoon shows, conducted by Luca Barbarossa and Andrea Perroni, where the artists and their entries were presented.

==== Standard selection ====
On October 19, 2018, Rai Commission for Sanremo Music Festival 2019 announced a list of 677 acts, but only 69 artists coming from all Italian regions -excluding Basilicata and Valle d'Aosta- and from abroad were selected in the first phase.

On November 27, 2018, Rai Commission announced the eighteen finalists.

- Angelucci - "L'uomo che verrà"
- Andrea Biagioni - "Alba piena"
- Cannella - "Nei miei ricordi"
- Cordio - "La nostra vita"
- Diego Conti - "3 gradi"
- Einar - "Centomila Volte" (Cuba)
- Federica Abbate - "Finalmente"
- Fosco17 - "Dicembre"
- Giulia Mutti - "Almeno tre"
- La Rua - "Alla mia età si vola"
- La Zero - "Nina è brava"
- Le Ore - "La mia felpa è come me"
- Mahmood - "Gioventù bruciata"
- Marte Marasco - "Nella mia testa"
- Nyvinne – "Io ti penso" (Luxembourg)
- Ros - "Incendio"
- Symo - "Paura d'amare"
- Wepro - "Stop/Replay"

==== Area Sanremo ====
After the auditions, RAI Commission - composed by Claudio Baglioni, Claudio Fasulo, Duccio Forzano, Massimo Giuliano, Massimo Martelli and Geoff Westley- identified 6 finalists for the competition among the 225 acts:

- Deschema - "Cristallo"
- Fedrix & Flaw - "L'impresa"
- Francesca Miola - "Amarsi non serve"
- Mescalina - "Chiamami amore adesso"
- Saita – "Niwrad" (Switzerland)
- Sisma - "Slow motion"

=== Sanremo Giovani 2018 ===
On December 20 and 21, 2018, the twenty four finalists performed their songs at Sanremo Casino in Sanremo, with the show Sanremo Giovani 2018 broadcast on Rai 1 presented by Pippo Baudo and Fabio Rovazzi. The two winners of the nights participated in Sanremo 2019 with a new entry. Einar and Mahmood were selected as the winners.

Enters Sanremo 2019

R/O	Artist	Song	Place	Televote results	
R/O	Artist	Song	Place	Percentage	Place
1	Fosco17	"Dicembre"	8	4.65%	9
2	Einar	"Centomila volte"	1	24.32%	1
3	Andrea Biagioni	"Alba piena"	4	7.75%	6
4	Symo	"Paura di amare"	12	3.02%	11
5	Fedrix & Flaw	"L'impresa"	10	4.67%	8
6	Ros	"Incendio"	6	7.88%	4
7	Marte Marasco	"Nella mia testa"	7	6.13%	7
8	Wepro	"Stop/Replay"	9	3.36%	10
9	Giulia Mutti	"Almeno tre"	5	9.67%	3
10	Federica Abbate	"Finalmente"	2	7.88%	4
11	Diego Conti	"3 gradi"	11	2.81%	12
12	Deschema	"Cristallo"	3	17.85%	2

R/O	Artist	Song	Place	Televote results	
R/O	Artist	Song	Place	Percentage	Place
1	Le Ore	"La mia felpa è come me"	11	4.68%	8
2	Francesca Miola	"Amarsi non serve"	9	5.32%	6
3	Mahmood	"Gioventù bruciata"	1	5.03%	7
4	Angelucci	"L'uomo che verrà"	7	7.10%	4
5	Sisma	"Slow motion"	5	6.16%	5
6	La Rua	"Alla mia età si vola"	2	35.08%	1
7	Nyvinne	"Io ti penso"	3	4.40%	9
8	Cordio	"La nostra vita"	4	14.76%	2
9	La Zero	"Nina è brava"	8	3.83%	10
10	Cannella	"Nei miei ricordi"	10	2.93%	11
11	Saita	"Niwrad"	12	1.08%	12
12	Mescalina	"Chiamami amore adesso"	6	9.65%	3

=== Big Artists section ===
The Big Artists section of the contest reverted to 24 artists, after briefly going up to 22 the previous year. Like the previous year, there were no eliminations during the four weeknight shows. All the artists performed several times and were scored during the week, but every competing artist advanced to the final night.

== Competing entries ==
Competing songs and artists, showing writers, orchestra conductor and results achieved
Big Artists section
Song	Artist	Songwriter(s)	Orchestra conductor	Rank	Sanremo Music Festival Awards
"Soldi"	Mahmood	Mahmood; Dardust; Charlie Charles	Dario "Dardust" Faini	1	Winner of the "Big Artists" section – Golden Lion; "Enzo Jannacci" Award for Best Performance
"I tuoi particolari"	Ultimo	Niccolò Moriconi	Diego Calvetti	2	TIMmusic Award for Most-Streamed Song
"Musica che resta"	Il Volo	Gianna Nannini; Emilio Munda; Piero Romitelli; Pasquale Mammaro; Antonello Carozza	Adriano Pennino	3	
"Cosa ti aspetti da me"	Loredana Bertè	Gaetano Curreri; Gerardo Pulli; Piero Romitelli	Massimo Zanotti	4	"Ariston's Audience" Award
"Abbi cura di me"	Simone Cristicchi	Simone Cristicchi; Nicola Brunialti; Gabriele Ortenzi	Roberto Rossi	5	"Giancarlo Bigazzi" Award for Best Arrangement; "Sergio Endrigo" Award for Best Interpretation
"Argentovivo"	Daniele Silvestri	Daniele Silvestri; Tarek Iurcich; Fabio Rondanini; Manuel Agnelli	Enrico Gabrielli	6	Critics' Award "Mia Martini"; Press, Radio, TV & Web Award "Lucio Dalla"; "Sergio Bardotti" Award for Best Lyrics
"La ragazza con il cuore di latta"	Irama	Irama; Giuseppe Colonnelli; Andrea Debernardi, Giulio Nenna	Giulio Nenna	7	
"Mi sento bene"	Arisa	Matteo Buzzanca; Lorenzo Vizzini; Rosalba Pippa; Alessandra Flora	Fabio Gurian	8	
"Rolls Royce"	Achille Lauro	Achille Lauro; Davide Petrella; Daniele Deizi; Daniele Mungai; Boss Doms	Enrico Melozzi	9	
"Nonno Hollywood"	Enrico Nigiotti	Enrico Nigiotti	Federico Megozzi	10	Lunezia Award for Best Music-letterary Value
"Per un milione"	Boomdabash	Federica Abbate; Alfredo Rapetti Mogol; Rocco Pagliarulo; Angelo Cisternino; Alessandro Merli; Fabio Clemente	Valeriano Chiaravalle	11	
"Rose viola"	Ghemon	Ghemon; Stefano "Zef" Tognini	Valeriano Chiaravalle	12	
"Solo una canzone"	Ex-Otago	Maurizio Carucci; Simone Bertuccini; Olmo Martellacci; Francesco Bacci; Rachid Bouchabla	Dario "Dardust" Faini	13	
"Dov'è l'Italia"	Motta	Francesco Motta	Fabio Gurian	14	Best Duet Performance Award
"Aspetto che torni"	Francesco Renga	Bungaro; Francesco Renga; Cesare Chiodo; Rakele; Giacomo Runco	Roberto Rossi	15	
"L'ultimo ostacolo"	Paola Turci	Paola Turci; Luca Chiaravalli; Stefano Marletta; Edwyn Roberts	Massimo Zanotti	16	
"L'amore è una dittatura"	The Zen Circus	Andrea Appino; Gian Paolo Cuccuru; Massimiliano Schiavelli	Carlo Carcano	17	
"Senza farlo apposta"	Federica Carta & Shade	Shade; Jacopo Ettore; Jaro	Pino Perris	18	
"Mi farò trovare pronto"	Nek	Filippo Neviani; Luca Chiaravalli; Paolo Antonacci	Massimo Zanotti	19	
"I ragazzi stanno bene"	Negrita	Paolo Bruni; Cesare Petricich; Enrico Salvi; Lorenzo Cilembrini; Francesco Barbacci; Guglielmo Ridolfo Gagliano	Valeriano Chiaravalle	20	
"Un po' come la vita"	Patty Pravo feat. Briga	Marco Rettani; Diego Calvetti; Zibba; Briga; Luca Lenori	Diego Calvetti	21	
"Le nostre anime di notte"	Anna Tatangelo	Lorenzo Vizzini	Adriano Pennino	22	
"Parole nuove"	Einar	Antonio Maiello; Enrico Palmosi; Nicola Marotta	Pino Perris	23	
"Un'altra luce"	Nino D'Angelo & Livio Cori	Livio Cori; Nino D'Angelo; Francesco Fogliano; Massimiliano Dagani; Mario Fracchiolla	Fabio Gurian	24	

== Shows ==
=== First evening ===
The 24 Big Artists each performed their song for the first time.

High ranking
Middle ranking
Low ranking

R/O	Artist	Song	Votes				Place
R/O	Artist	Song	Public (weight 40%)	Demoscopic Jury (weight 30%)	Press Jury (weight 30%)	Average	Place
1	Francesco Renga	"Aspetto che torni"	3.74%	8	20	3.47%	11
2	Nino D'Angelo & Livio Cori	"Un'altra luce"	2.51%	20	21	1.94%	22
3	Nek	"Mi farò trovare pronto"	4.04%	5	16	4.11%	10
4	The Zen Circus	"L'amore è una dittatura"	2.28%	17	11	2.98%	16
5	Il Volo	"Musica che resta"	17.21%	1	13	10.72%	2
6	Loredana Bertè	"Cosa ti aspetti da me"	3.92%	3	5	5.85%	4
7	Daniele Silvestri	"Argentovivo"	2.90%	6	3	5.30%	5
8	Federica Carta & Shade	"Senza farlo apposta"	5.27%	12	24	3.45%	12
9	Ultimo	"I tuoi particolari"	17.99%	2	6	11.53%	1
10	Paola Turci	"L'ultimo ostacolo"	2.57%	11	14	3.15%	14
11	Motta	"Dov'è l'Italia"	1.57%	22	9	2.63%	19
12	Boomdabash	"Per un milione"	4.80%	10	12	4.55%	9
13	Patty Pravo feat. Briga	"Un po' come la vita"	3.31%	16	19	2.69%	18
14	Simone Cristicchi	"Abbi cura di me"	4.06%	4	2	6.43%	3
15	Achille Lauro	"Rolls Royce"	2.74%	24	7	3.14%	15
16	Arisa	"Mi sento bene"	2.07%	9	4	4.69%	7
17	Negrita	"I ragazzi stanno bene"	2.09%	14	15	2.58%	20
18	Ghemon	"Rose viola"	1.81%	23	18	1.75%	23
19	Einar	"Parole nuove"	2.49%	18	23	1.96%	21
20	Ex-Otago	"Solo una canzone"	3.95%	21	16	2.82%	17
21	Anna Tatangelo	"Le nostre anime di notte"	1.20%	15	22	1.57%	24
22	Irama	"La ragazza con il cuore di latta"	4.52%	7	9	4.91%	6
23	Enrico Nigiotti	"Nonno Hollywood"	1.22%	13	8	3.22%	13
24	Mahmood	"Soldi"	1.74%	19	1	4.55%	8

=== Second evening ===
The first twelve Big Artists each performed their song again.

High ranking
Middle ranking
Low ranking

R/O	Artist	Song	Votes				Place
R/O	Artist	Song	Public (weight 40%)	Demoscopic Jury (weight 30%)	Press Jury (weight 30%)	Average	Place
1	Achille Lauro	"Rolls Royce"	7.13%	12	4	7.55%	5
2	Einar	"Parole nuove"	6.57%	8	11	4.96%	10
3	Il Volo	"Musica che resta"	38.32%	1	8	21.51%	1
4	Arisa	"Mi sento bene"	5.83%	5	1	12.78%	2
5	Nek	"Mi farò trovare pronto"	5.88%	4	9	6.56%	6
6	Daniele Silvestri	"Argentovivo"	5.40%	3	2	10.95%	4
7	Ex-Otago	"Solo una canzone"	5.78%	10	6	5.00%	9
8	Ghemon	"Rose viola"	3.42%	11	5	3.92%	11
9	Loredana Bertè	"Cosa ti aspetti da me"	8.12%	2	3	12.35%	3
10	Paola Turci	"L'ultimo ostacolo"	3.21%	6	7	5.04%	8
11	Negrita	"I ragazzi stanno bene"	3.06%	9	10	3.79%	12
12	Federica Carta & Shade	"Senza farlo apposta"	7.29%	7	12	5.58%	7

=== Third evening ===
The other twelve Big Artists each performed their song for the second time.

High ranking
Middle ranking
Low ranking

R/O	Artist	Song	Votes				Place
R/O	Artist	Song	Public (weight 40%)	Demoscopic Jury (weight 30%)	Press Jury (weight 30%)	Average	Place
1	Mahmood	"Soldi"	4.32%	8	2	8.94%	4
2	Enrico Nigiotti	"Nonno Hollywood"	8.02%	5	6	8.65%	5
3	Anna Tatangelo	"Le nostre anime di notte"	2.85%	7	9	4.15%	10
4	Ultimo	"I tuoi particolari"	27.92%	2	3	19.90%	1
5	Francesco Renga	"Aspetto che torni"	6.83%	4	8	7.29%	7
6	Irama	"La ragazza con il cuore di latta"	14.62%	3	4	12.32%	3
7	Patty Pravo feat. Briga	"Un po' come la vita"	3.77%	10	11	3.58%	11
8	Simone Cristicchi	"Abbi cura di me"	9.69%	1	1	13.99%	2
9	Boomdabash	"Per un milione"	11.42%	6	10	8.29%	6
10	Motta	"Dov'è l'Italia"	2.64%	12	5	4.66%	9
11	The Zen Circus	"L'amore è un dittatura"	3.73%	9	7	5.11%	8
12	Nino D'Angelo & Livio Cori	"Un'altra luce"	4.20%	11	12	3.13%	12

=== Fourth evening ===
The 24 Big Artists performed their songs in a duet with a guest artist.

R/O	Artist	Guest	Song	Votes				Place
R/O	Artist	Guest	Song	Public (weight 50%)	Experts Jury (weight 20%)	Press Jury (weight 30%)	Average	Place
1	Federica Carta & Shade	Cristina D'Avena	"Senza farlo apposta"	7	21	20	2,40	16
2	Motta	Nada	"Dov'è l'Italia"	23	3	13	3,89	9
3	Irama	Noemi	"La ragazza con il cuore di latta"	4	13	11	5,61	7
4	Patty Pravo feat. Briga	Giovanni Caccamo	"Un po' come la vita"	15	15	23	1,42	21
5	Negrita	Enrico Ruggeri and Roy Paci	"I ragazzi stanno bene"	20	11	19	1,86	19
6	Il Volo	Alessandro Quarta	"Musica che resta"	1	21	9	12,47	1
7	Arisa	Tony Hadley and Kataklò	"Mi sento bene"	9	8	1	5,41	8
7	Mahmood	Gué Pequeno	"Soldi"	13	1	3	8,30	3
9	Ghemon	Diodato and Calibro 35	"Rose viola"	19	5	8	3,82	10
10	Francesco Renga	Bungaro, Eleonora Abbagnato and Friedemann Vogel	"Aspetto che torni"	8	18	18	2,10	17
11	Ultimo	Fabrizio Moro	"I tuoi particolari"	3	6	7	10,29	2
12	Nek	Neri Marcorè	"Mi farò trovare pronto"	13	15	20	1,60	20
13	Boomdabash	Rocco Hunt and Musici Cantori di Milano	"Per un milione"	6	9	16	3,76	11
14	The Zen Circus	Brunori Sas	"L'amore è una dittatura"	14	10	14	2,61	14
15	Paola Turci	Giuseppe Fiorello	"L'ultimo ostacolo"	22	12	17	1,87	18
16	Anna Tatangelo	Syria	"Le nostre anime di notte"	24	18	15	1,29	22
17	Ex-Otago	Jack Savoretti	"Solo una canzone"	17	6	12	3,05	13
18	Enrico Nigiotti	Paolo Jannacci and Massimo Ottoni	"Nonno Hollywood"	10	18	10	2,49	15
19	Loredana Bertè	Irene Grandi	"Cosa ti aspetti da me"	1	4	6	7,08	4
20	Daniele Silvestri	Manuel Agnelli	"Argentovivo"	21	2	2	6,35	6
21	Einar	Biondo and Sergio Sylvestre	"Parole nuove"	16	21	23	1,19	23
22	Simone Cristicchi	Ermal Meta	"Abbi cura di me"	5	13	4	6,55	5
23	Nino D'Angelo & Livio Cori	Sottotono	"Un'altra luce"	18	21	22	1,18	24
24	Achille Lauro	Morgan	"Rolls Royce"	11	15	6	3,41	12

=== Fifth evening ===
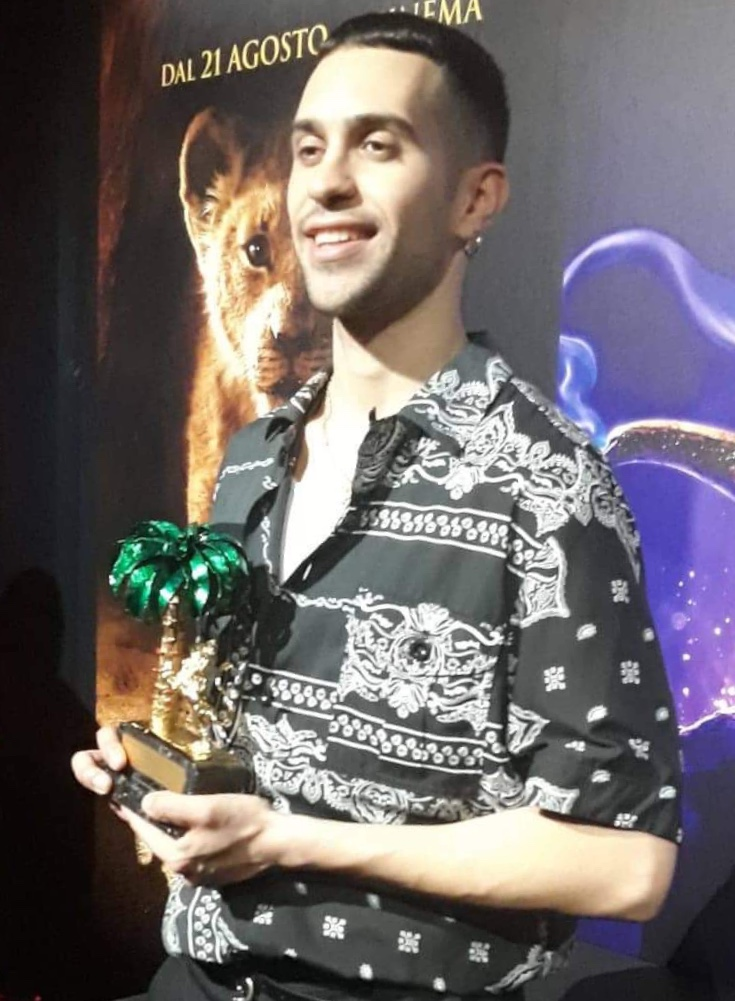
Mahmood after winning the final

The 24 Big Artists each performed their entry again for a final time. The top three faced a superfinal vote, then the winner of Sanremo 2019 was decided.

Advanced to second round

R/O	Artist	Song	Votes				Place
R/O	Artist	Song	Public (weight 50%)	Experts Jury (weight 20%)	Press Jury (weight 30%)	Average	Place
1	Daniele Silvestri	"Argentovivo"	9	2	3	5,87	6
2	Anna Tatangelo	"Le nostre anime di notte"	18	18	18	1,08	22
3	Ghemon	"Rose viola"	17	5	9	3,16	12
4	Negrita	"I ragazzi stanno bene"	21	10	18	1,55	20
5	Ultimo	"I tuoi particolari"	1	7	6	12,92	2
6	Nek	"Mi farò trovare pronto"	14	17	20	1,49	19
7	Loredana Bertè	"Cosa ti aspetti da me"	3	6	1	10,35	4
8	Francesco Renga	"Aspetto che torni"	13	18	17	1,65	15
9	Mahmood	"Soldi"	7	1	2	13,30	1
10	Ex-Otago	"Sola una canzone"	16	8	11	2,58	13
11	Il Volo	"Musica che resta"	2	21	13	9,48	3
12	Paola Turci	"L'ultimo ostacolo"	15	9	16	2,11	16
13	The Zen Circus	"L'amore è una dittatura"	19	12	12	1,75	17
14	Patty Pravo ft. Briga	"Un po' come la vita"	22	18	21	0,85	21
15	Arisa	"Mi sento bene"	12	3	4	4,95	8
16	Irama	"La ragazza con il cuore di latta"	4	12	10	5,60	7
17	Achille Lauro	"Rolls Royce"	8	12	7	4,09	9
18	Nino D'Angelo & Livio Cori	"Un'altra luce"	20	21	23	0,72	24
19	Federica Carta & Shade	"Senza farlo apposta"	11	21	21	1,52	18
20	Simone Cristicchi	"Abbi cura di me"	5	12	4	6,01	5
21	Enrico Nigiotti	"Nonno Hollywood"	6	12	8	3,53	10
22	Boomdabash	"Per un milione"	10	11	15	2,55	11
23	Einar	"Parole nuove"	23	21	23	0,68	23
24	Motta	"Dov'è l'Italia"	24	4	14	2,23	14

==== Superfinal ====
Winner
Runner-up
Third place

R/O	Artist	Song	Votes			Place
R/O	Artist	Song	Jury (weight 50%)	Public (weight 50%)	Average	Place
1	Ultimo	"I tuoi particolari"	24.7%	48.80%	35.6%	2
2	Il Volo	"Musica che resta"	11.6%	30.26%	25.5%	3
3	Mahmood	"Soldi"	63.7%	20.95%	38.9%	1

== Special guests ==
The special guests of Sanremo Music Festival 2019 were:

- Singers / musicians: Alessandra Amoroso, Anastastio, Andrea Bocelli, Antonello Venditti, Elisa Toffoli, Eros Ramazzotti, Fiorella Mannoia, Giorgia, Ligabue, Luis Fonsi, Marco Mengoni, Matteo Bocelli, Raf, Riccardo Cocciante, Tom Walker, Umberto Tozzi.
- Actors / comedians / directors / models: Claudio Santamaria, Laura Chiatti, Mago Forest, Michelle Hunziker, Michele Riondino, Pio e Amedeo, Pierfrancesco Favino, Serena Rossi.
- Other notable figures: Fabio Rovazzi, Pippo Baudo, Simona Ventura.

== Related shows ==
=== Prima Festival ===
Simone Montedoro and Anna Ferzetti hosted PrimaFestival, a side-show that aired on Rai 1 immediately after TG1. The show featured details, curiosities and news relating to Sanremo Music Festival 2019.

=== Dopo Festival ===
Rocco Papaleo, with the participation of Anna Foglietta and Melissa Greta Marchetto and a group of journalists of Italian press, hosted Dopofestival - The Dark Side of Sanremo a talk show that aired on Rai 1 immediately after Sanremo Music Festival. The show featured comments about the Festival as well as interviews to the singers competing in the song contest.

== Broadcast and ratings ==
=== Local broadcast ===
Rai 1, Rai Premium and Rai Radio 2 are the official broadcasters of the festival in Italy. The show is also available in streaming via website on Rai Play.

==== Ratings Sanremo Music Festival 2019 ====
The audience is referred to the one of Rai 1.

Live Show	Timeslot (UTC+1)	Date	1st time (9.00pm - 0.00am)		2nd time (0.00am - 1.00am)		Overall audience	
Live Show	Timeslot (UTC+1)	Date	Viewers	Share (%)	Viewers	Share (%)	Viewers	Share (%)
1st	9:00 pm	February 5	12,282,000	49.4	5,120,000	50.1	10,086,000	49.5
2nd	9:00 pm	February 6	10,959,000	46.3	5,260,000	52.0	9,144,000	47.3
3rd	9:00 pm	February 7	10,851,000	46.4	5,099,000	49.0	9,409,000	46.7
4th	9:00 pm	February 8	11,170,000	45.5	6,215,000	48.6	9,552,000	46.1
5th	9:00 pm	February 9	12,129,000	53.1	8,394,000	65.2	10,622,000	56.5

==== Ratings Prima Festival 2019 ====
Episode	Timeslot (UTC+1)	Date	Viewers	Share (%)
1	8:30 pm	February 5	8,012,000	29.9
2	8:30 pm	February 6	10,805,000	38.8
3	8:30 pm	February 7	9,574,000	35.2
4	8:30 pm	February 8	9,941,000	37.0
5	8:30 pm	February 9	10,691,000	43.5

==== Ratings Dopo Festival 2019 ====
Episode	Timeslot (UTC+1)	Date	Viewers	Share (%)
1	1:00 am	February 6	1,663,000	36.0
2	1:00 am	February 7	1,802,000	37.4
3	1:00 am	February 8	1,650,000	32.5
4	1:00 am	February 9	2,025,000	35.0
5	1:00 am	February 10	3,305,000	51.0

=== International broadcast ===
The international television service Rai Italia broadcast the competition in the Americas, Africa, Asia and Australia. The contest was also streamed via the official Eurovision Song Contest website eurovision.tv.

== See also ==
- Italy in the Eurovision Song Contest 2019
