= L'ultima poesia =

2024 song by Geolier and Ultimo

Single by Geolier and Ultimo

from the album Dio lo sa
- Language: Italian; Neapolitan
- Released: 22 March 2024
- Genre: Pop rap
- Length: 3:48
- Label: Warner
- Songwriters: Emanuele Palumbo; Niccolò Moriconi; Davide Petrella; Gennaro Petito; Julien Boverod; Alessandro Merli; Fabio Clemente
- Producer: Takagi & Ketra

Geolier singles chronology
"I p' me, tu p' te" (2024)	"L'ultima poesia" (2024)	"Sarò con te" (2024)

Ultimo singles chronology
"Occhi lucidi" (2023)	"L'ultima poesia" (2024)	"Altrove" (2024)

Music video
- "L'ultima poesia" on YouTube

"L'ultima poesia" (transl. The last poem) is a song by Italian rapper Geolier and Italian singer Ultimo. The song was produced by Takagi & Ketra and released by Warner Music on 22 March 2024 as the second single from Geolier's third studio album, Dio lo sa.

The song peaked at number 1 on the Italian singles chart.

== Music video ==
The music video of "L'ultima poesia" was shot in Naples and released via Geolier's YouTube channel.

== Charts ==
=== Weekly charts ===
Weekly chart performance for "L'ultima poesia"
Chart (2024)	Peak position
Italy (FIMI)	1
Italy Airplay (EarOne)	7
Switzerland (Schweizer Hitparade)	72

=== Year-end charts ===
Year-end chart performance for "L'ultima poesia"
Chart	Year	Position
Italy (FIMI)	2024	7
Italy (FIMI)	2025	88

== Certifications ==
Certifications for "L'ultima poesia"
Region	Certification	Certified units/sales
Italy (FIMI)	4× Platinum	400,000^{‡}
^{‡} Sales+streaming figures based on certification alone.
