= Villa Inferno =

Studio album by Zen Circus, Brian Ritchie
- Released: 2008
- Genre: Folk punk, indie rock
- Length: 43:38
- Label: Unhip Records

Zen Circus, Brian Ritchie chronology
Vita e opinioni di Nello Scarpellini, gentiluomo (2005)	Villa Inferno (2008)	Andate tutti Affanculo (2009)

Villa Inferno is the fifth album by Italian band Zen Circus released in 2008 by Unhip Records. Villa Inferno was created in collaboration with Brian Ritchie of the American band Violent Femmes.

== Track listing ==
1. Dead Penfriend - 2:41
2. Wild Wild Life (Talking Heads cover) - 3:17
3. Beat the Drum - 3:43
4. Punk Lullaby - 2:30
5. Dirty Feet - 2:20
6. Figlio di puttana - 4:02
7. Like a Girl Never Would - 4:41
8. Narodna Pjesma - 1:59
9. He Was Robert Zimmerman - 4:00
10. Vana gloria - 3:37
11. Oh, the River! - 3:55
12. Vent'anni - 1:55
13. Les tantes de la dimanche - 5:58
