= Francesco Motta =

Motta
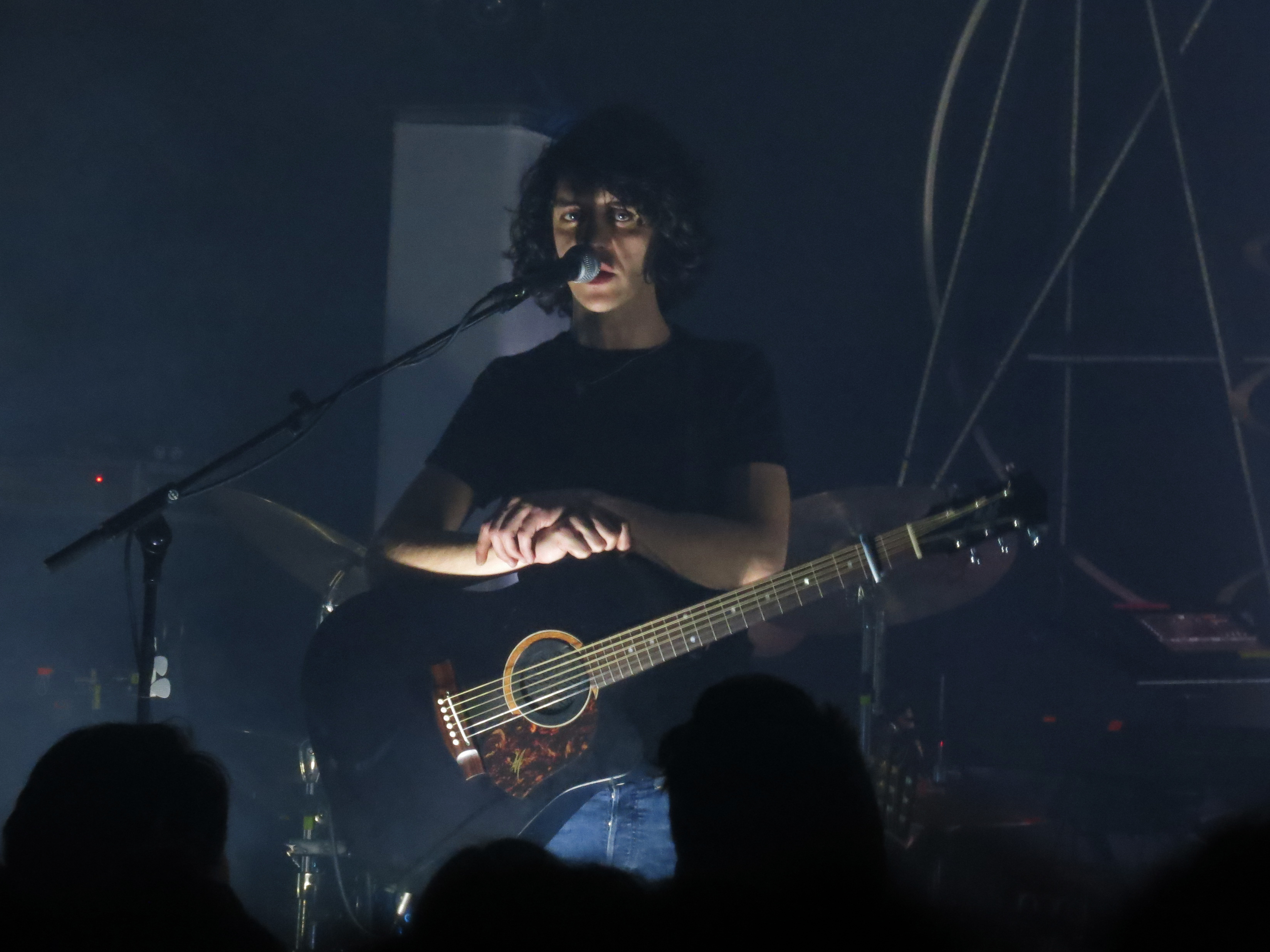
- Motta playing live in Pisa in 2017

Background information
- Born: Francesco Motta; 10 October 1986 (age 39); Pisa, Tuscany, Italy
- Genres: Alternative rock Indie rock
- Occupation: Singer-songwriter
- Years active: 2006–present
- Label: Woodworm

Francesco Motta, known simply as Motta (born 10 October 1986), is an Italian singer-songwriter.

== Biography ==
Born in Pisa, he debuted as lead vocalist, lyricist and drummer with his new wave punk band Criminal Jokers. Their first English-language album This Was Supposed to Be the Future (2010) was produced by Andrea Appino from The Zen Circus; the second album Bestie was entirely written in Italian and released in 2012.

In 2013 he moved to Rome where he studied soundtrack composition at the Centro Sperimentale di Cinematografia and started his solo career in 2016 with the studio album La fine dei vent'anni, which earned him the Targa Tenco "Opera prima" on 20 September 2016.

He participated at the Sanremo Music Festival 2019 with the song "Dov'è l'Italia".

== Discography ==
=== Studio albums ===
- La fine dei vent'anni (2016)
- Vivere o morire (2018)
- Semplice (2021)
- La musica è finita (2023)
