= Canzoni contro la natura =

Studio album by Zen Circus
- Released: 21 January 2014
- Genre: Folk punk, indie rock, punk rock
- Label: La Tempesta Dischi

Zen Circus chronology
Metal Arcade Vol. 1 (2012)	Canzoni contro la natura (2014)	La terza guerra mondiale (2016)

Canzoni contro la natura ("Songs against nature") is the eighth studio album by Italian band Zen Circus, released on 21 January 2014 by label La Tempesta Dischi.

== Track listing ==
1. "Viva"
2. "Postumia"
3. "Canzone contro la natura"
4. "Vai vai vai!"
5. "Albero di tiglio"
6. "L'anarchico e il generale"
7. "Mi son ritrovato vivo"
8. "Dalì"
9. "No Way"
10. "Sestri Levante"

== Charts ==
Chart (2014)	Peak position
Italian Albums (FIMI)	9
