= Acquario =

Single by Ultimo
- Released: 9 January 2026
- Genre: Pop
- Length: 3:13
- Label: Ultimo Records
- Songwriter: Niccolò Moriconi
- Producers: Ultimo; Yoshi

Ultimo singles chronology
"Bella davvero" (2025)	"Acquario" (2026)	"Questa insensata voglia di te" (2026)

Music video
- "Acquario" on YouTube

"Acquario" (transl. Acquarium) is a song by Italian singer-songwriter Ultimo. It was released on 9 January 2026.

== Description ==
The song was written and composed by the singer-songwriter himself, who also handled the production with Matteo "Yoshi" Nesi, and is inspired by the astrological symbol of the same name, as well as his zodiac sign.

== Promotion ==
The song's release was revealed on 7 January 2026 by the singer-songwriter himself through his social media profiles, along with several clues based on the analysis of astrological symbols released in the previous months.

== Music video ==
The music video, directed by YouNuts!, a duo composed of Antonio Usbergo and Niccolò Celaia, was released alongside the song on the Ultimo's YouTube channel. The video stars the artist himself, disguised as an alien.

== Charts ==
Chart performance for "Acquario"
Chart (2026)	Peak position
Italy (FIMI)	3

== Certifications ==
Certifications for "Acquario"
Region	Certification	Certified units/sales
Italy (FIMI)	Gold	100,000^{‡}
^{‡} Sales+streaming figures based on certification alone.
