= Einar (singer) =

Cuban-Italian singer

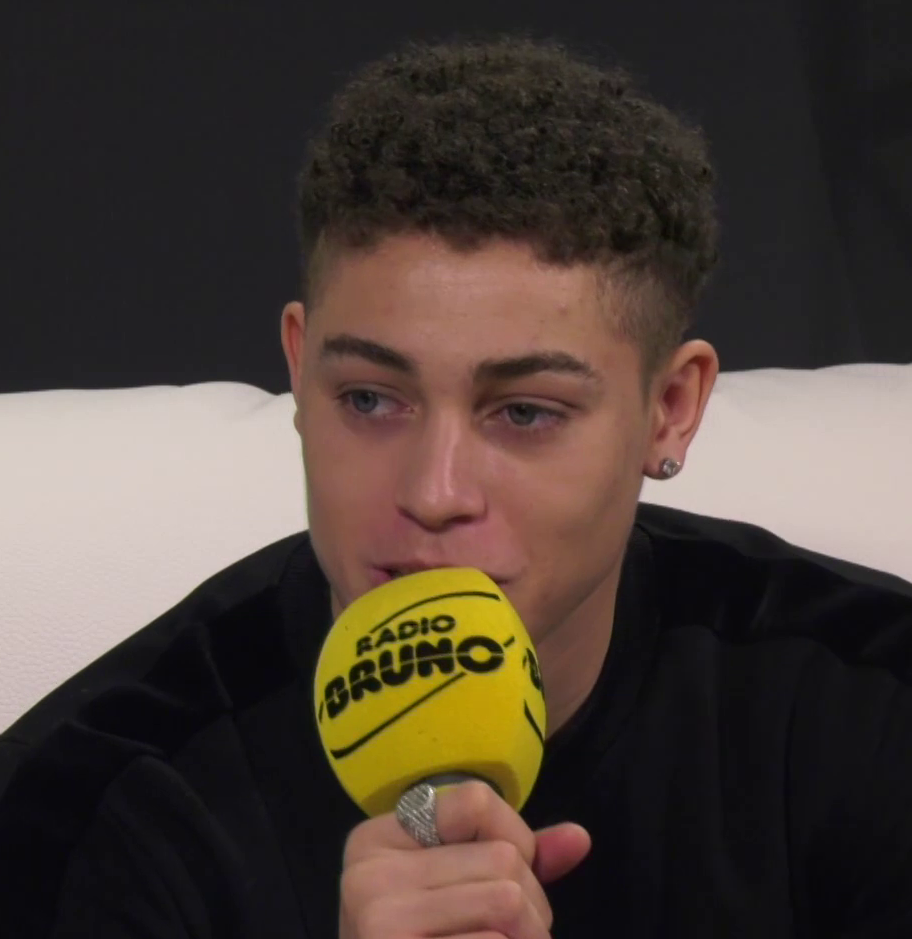
- Einar interviewed in February 2019

Background information
- Born: Einar Ortiz; 22 May 1993 (age 33); Santiago de Cuba, Cuba
- Genres: Pop
- Occupation: Singer
- Instrument: Vocals
- Years active: 2017–present
- Labels: Sony Music (2018–2020); ADA Music Italy (dal 2022)

Einar Ortiz (born 22 May 1993), known professionally as simply Einar, is a Cuban-Italian singer.

He ended up third in the seventeenth edition of the Italian talent show Amici di Maria De Filippi and released his debut EP Einar on 1 June 2018.

Einar participated at the Sanremo Music Festival 2019 with the song "Parole nuove".

== Discography ==
=== Studio albums ===
- Parole nuove (2019)
- Istinto (2022)

=== Extended plays ===
- Einar (2018)

=== Singles ===
- "Chi ama non dimentica" (2018)
- "Salutalo da parte mia" (2018)
- "Notte d'agosto" (2018)
- "Centomila volte" (2018)
- "Parole nuove" (2019)
- "Un'altra volta te" (2019)
- "Caligine" (2021)
