= Altrove =

Studio album by Ultimo
- Released: 17 May 2024
- Genre: Pop
- Length: 26:00
- Label: Ultimo Records
- Producers: Ultimo; Katoo; Yoshi; Federico Nardelli; G-laspada

Ultimo chronology
| Alba (2023) | Altrove (2024) | Ultimo Live Stadi 2024 (2025) |

Singles from Altrove
- 1. "Occhi lucidi" Released: 1 December 2023; 2. "Altrove" Released: 10 May 2024; 3. "Neve al sole" Released: 27 September 2024

Altrove (transl. Elsewhere) is the sixth studio album by Italian singer-songwriter Ultimo, released on 17 May 2024 by Ultimo Records.

The album, surprisingly announced on 16 April 2024, debuted at the top of the FIMI Album chart.

== Track listing ==
Altrove track listing
| No. | Title | Writer(s) | Producer(s) | Length |
|---|---|---|---|---|
| 1. | "Altrove" | Niccolò Moriconi | Ultimo; Katoo | 3:25 |
| 2. | "Lunedì" | Moriconi | Ultimo; Yoshi | 3:14 |
| 3. | "Quando saremo vecchi" | Moriconi | Federico Nardelli | 3:22 |
| 4. | "Neve al sole" | Moriconi; Matteo Nesi | Ultimo; Yoshi | 3:20 |
| 5. | "Quei due innamorati" | Moriconi | Ultimo; Yoshi | 3:30 |
| 6. | "Amore di strada" | Moriconi | Ultimo; Katoo | 2:58 |
| 7. | "Occhi lucidi" | Moriconi | Ultimo; Yoshi | 3:24 |
| 8. | "Diluvio universale" (featuring Mezzosangue) | Moriconi | Ultimo; G-Iaspada | 3:24 |
| Total length: | | | | 26:00 |

Bonus tracks in the limited edition
| No. | Title | Length |
|---|---|---|
| 9. | "Vorrei rinascere fiore" | 2:22 |
| 10. | "Lunedì" (unplugged) | 3:50 |

== Charts ==
=== Weekly charts ===
Weekly chart performance for Altrove
| Chart (2024) | Peak position |
|---|---|
| Italian Albums (FIMI) | 1 |
| Swiss Albums (Schweizer Hitparade) | 8 |

=== Year-end charts ===
Year-end chart performance for Altrove
| Chart | Year | Position |
|---|---|---|
| Italian Albums (FIMI) | 2024 | 18 |

== Certifications ==
Certifications for Altrove
| Region | Certification | Certified units/sales |
|---|---|---|
| Italy (FIMI) | 2× Platinum | 100,000^{‡} |
^{‡} Sales+streaming figures based on certification alone.
