= Colpa delle favole =

Studio album by Ultimo
- Released: 5 April 2019
- Studio: Enemies Lab (Rome); Platinum Studio (San Gimignano)
- Genre: Pop
- Length: 46:10
- Label: Honiro
- Producer: Enemies; Diego Calvetti

Ultimo chronology
Peter Pan (2018)	Colpa delle favole (2019)	Solo (2021)

Singles from Colpa delle favole
- 1. "I tuoi particolari" Released: 6 February 2019; 2. "Fateme cantà" Released: 22 February 2019; 3. "Rondini al guinzaglio" Released: 5 April 2019; 4. "Ipocondria" Released: 7 June 2019; 5. "Piccola stella" Released: 16 August 2019; 6. "Quando fuori piove" Released: 4 October 2019

Colpa delle favole is the third studio album by Italian singer-songwriter Ultimo, released by Honiro on 5 April 2019. The album was preceded by the single "I tuoi particolari", which competed in the 69th Sanremo Music Festival, placing second in the main competition. "Fateme cantà" and "Rondini al guinzaglio" were also launched before the album was released.

It debuted at number one on the Italian FIMI Albums Chart, holding the top spot for five consecutive weeks. Colpa delle favole also became the best-selling album of 2019 in Italy.

== Track listing ==
Track listing adapted from iTunes.

No.	Title	Writer(s)	Length
1.	"Colpa delle favole"	Niccolò Moriconi	3:04
2.	"I tuoi particolari"	Moriconi	3:39
3.	"Quando fuori piove"	Moriconi	3:41
4.	"Ipocondria"	Moriconi	3:01
5.	"Fateme cantà"	Moriconi	4:11
6.	"Rondini al guinzaglio"	Moriconi	4:00
7.	"Amati sempre"	Moriconi	4:04
8.	"Quella casa che avevamo in mente"	Moriconi	3:24
9.	"Piccola stella"	Moriconi	3:52
10.	"Aperitivo grezzo"	Moriconi	3:23
11.	"Fermo"	Moriconi	2:40
12.	"Il tuo nome (Comunque vada con te)"	Moriconi; Matteo Nesi	3:01
13.	"La stazione dei ricordi"	Moriconi	4:11
Total length:			46:10

== Charts ==
=== Weekly charts ===
Weekly chart performance for Colpa delle favole
Chart (2019)	Peak position
Italian Albums (FIMI)	1
Swiss Albums (Schweizer Hitparade)	21

=== Year-end charts ===
Year-end chart performance for Colpa delle favole
Chart	Year	Position
Italian Albums (FIMI)	2019	1
Italian Albums (FIMI)	2020	12
Italian Albums (FIMI)	2021	48
Italian Albums (FIMI)	2022	58
Italian Albums (FIMI)	2023	78

== Certifications ==
Region	Certification	Certified units/sales
Italy (FIMI)	6× Platinum	300,000^{‡}
^{‡} Sales+streaming figures based on certification alone.
