= Bella davvero =

Single by Ultimo

from the album Ultimo Live Stadi 2024
- Released: 18 April 2025
- Genre: Pop
- Length: 2:58
- Label: Ultimo Records
- Songwriter: Niccolò Moriconi
- Producers: Ultimo; Juli

Ultimo singles chronology
"La parte migliore di me" (2024)	"Bella davvero" (2025)	"Acquario" (2026)

Music video
- "Bella davvero" on YouTube

"Bella davvero" (transl. Really beautiful) is a song by Italian singer-songwriter Ultimo. It was released on 18 April 2025 by Ultimo Records as the second single from the first live album, Ultimo Live Stadi 2024.

== Description ==
The song was written and composed by the singer-songwriter himself, who also handled the production with Julien Boverod, aka Juli, and is inspired by an infinite love.

== Music video ==
The music video, directed by YouNuts!, a duo composed of Antonio Usbergo and Niccolò Celaia, was released alongside the song on the Ultimo's YouTube channel and features actors Beatrice Fiorentini and Luka Zunic. The video shows the secret location of the Raduno degli Ultimi, a major live event organized for the artist and scheduled for Rome in 2026.

== Charts ==
=== Weekly charts ===
Weekly chart performance for "Bella davvero"
Chart (2025)	Peak position
Italy (FIMI)	6
Italy Airplay (EarOne)	21

=== Year-end charts ===
Year-end chart performance for "Bella davvero"
Chart (2025)	Position
Italy (FIMI)	56

== Certifications ==
Certifications for "Bella davvero"
Region	Certification	Certified units/sales
Italy (FIMI)	Platinum	200,000^{‡}
^{‡} Sales+streaming figures based on certification alone.
