= Pianeti =

Studio album by Ultimo
- Released: 6 October 2017
- Studio: Enemies Lab (Rome); Bunkerino (Rome)
- Genre: Pop
- Length: 50:40
- Label: Honiro Label
- Producer: Enemies; Matteo Costanzo; Mixer T

Ultimo chronology
Pianeti (2017)	Peter Pan (2018)

Singles from Pianeti
- 1. "Chiave" Released: 6 March 2017; 2. "Ovunque tu sia" Released: 23 May 2017; 3. "Sabbia" Released: 25 July 2017; 4. "Pianeti" Released: 6 October 2017; 5. "Stasera" Released: 6 November 2017

Pianeti is the first studio album by Italian singer-songwriter Ultimo, released by Honiro Label on 6 October 2017. The album was preceded by the singles "Chiave", "Ovunque tu sia" and "Sabbia".

It debuted at number forty-seven on the Italian FIMI Albums Chart; in 2019 it peaked at number five.

== Track listing ==
No.	Title	Writer(s)	Length
1.	"Chiave"	Niccolò Moriconi	3:59
2.	"Il capolavoro"	Moriconi; Matteo Nesi	2:58
3.	"Pianeti"	Moriconi	3:44
4.	"Mille universi"	Moriconi	4:08
5.	"Sabbia"	Moriconi	3:38
6.	"Racconterò di te"	Moriconi	3:24
7.	"Giusy"	Moriconi	3:26
8.	"Ovunque tu sia"	Moriconi	3:19
9.	"La storia di un uomo"	Moriconi	3:24
10.	"Wendy"	Moriconi	3:13
11.	"L'unica forza che ho"	Moriconi	4:03
12.	"Sogni appesi"	Moriconi	3:32
13.	"L'eleganza delle stelle"	Moriconi	3:02
14.	"Stasera"	Moriconi	4:04
Total length:			50:40

== Charts ==
=== Weekly charts ===
Weekly chart performance for Pianeti
Chart (2019)	Peak position
Italian Albums (FIMI)	5

=== Year-end charts ===
Year-end chart performance for Pianeti
Chart	Year	Position
Italian Albums (FIMI)	2018	41
Italian Albums (FIMI)	2019	11
Italian Albums (FIMI)	2020	45
Italian Albums (FIMI)	2021	90
Italian Albums (FIMI)	2022	91

== Certifications ==
Region	Certification	Certified units/sales
Italy (FIMI)	4× Platinum	200,000^{‡}
^{‡} Sales+streaming figures based on certification alone.
