= Neve al sole =

Single by Ultimo

from the album Altrove
- Released: 27 September 2024
- Genre: Pop rock
- Length: 3:20
- Label: Ultimo Records
- Songwriter: Niccolò Moriconi
- Producers: Ultimo; Yoshi

Ultimo singles chronology
| "Altrove" (2024) | "Neve al sole" (2024) | "La parte migliore di me" (2024) |

Music video
- "Neve al sole" on YouTube

"Neve al sole" (transl. Snow in the sun) is a song by Italian singer-songwriter Ultimo. It was released on 27 September 2024 by Ultimo Records as the third single from the sixth studio album, Altrove.

== Description ==
The song is written and composed by the singer-songwriter himself, who also took care of the production with Yoshi.

== Music video ==
The music video, directed by YouNuts!, a duo composed of Antonio Usbergo and Niccolò Celaia, was released to coincide with the song's release on the Ultimo's YouTube channel and stars Ultimo himself on the streets of New York City.

== Charts ==
Weekly chart performance for "Neve al sole"
| Chart (2024) | Peak position |
|---|---|
| Italy (FIMI) | 38 |
| Italy Airplay (EarOne) | 28 |

== Certifications ==
Certifications for "Neve al sole"
| Region | Certification | Certified units/sales |
|---|---|---|
| Italy (FIMI) | Gold | 50,000^{‡} |
^{‡} Sales+streaming figures based on certification alone.
