= Occhi lucidi =

Single by Ultimo

from the album Altrove
- Released: 1 December 2023
- Genre: Pop
- Length: 3:24
- Label: Ultimo Records
- Songwriter: Niccolò Moriconi
- Producers: Ultimo; Yoshi

Ultimo singles chronology
"Nuvole in testa" (2023)	"Occhi lucidi" (2023)	"L'ultima poesia" (2024)

Music video
- "Occhi lucidi" on YouTube

"Occhi lucidi" (transl. Shiny eyes) is a song by Italian singer-songwriter Ultimo. It was released on 1 December 2023 by Ultimo Records as the first extract from the sixth studio album Altrove.

== Music video ==
The music video, directed by YouNuts!, a duo composed of Antonio Usbergo and Niccolò Celaia, was made available to coincide with the single's launch through the singer-songwriter's YouTube channel and stars Ultimo himself with Italian actress Maria Esposito.

== Charts ==
Weekly chart performance for "Occhi lucidi"
Chart (2023)	Peak position
Italy (FIMI)	10
Italy Airplay (EarOne)	16

== Certifications ==
Certifications for "Occhi lucidi"
Region	Certification	Certified units/sales
Italy (FIMI)	Gold	50,000^{‡}
^{‡} Sales+streaming figures based on certification alone.
