= Peter Pan (Ultimo album) =

Studio album by Ultimo
- Released: 9 February 2018
- Studio: Enemies Lab (Rome)
- Genre: Pop
- Length: 56:56
- Label: Honiro
- Producer: Enemies; Matteo Costanzo

Ultimo chronology
| Pianeti (2017) | Peter Pan (2018) | Colpa delle favole (2019) |

Singles from Peter Pan
- 1. "Il ballo delle incertezze" Released: 8 December 2017; 2. "Poesia senza veli" Released: 25 May 2018; 3. "Cascare nei tuoi occhi" Released: 14 September 2018; 4. "Ti dedico il silenzio" Released: 14 December 2018

Peter Pan is the second studio album by Italian singer-songwriter Ultimo, released by Honiro on 9 February 2018. The album was preceded by the single "Il ballo delle incertezze", which competed in the 69th Sanremo Music Festival, placing first in the "New Proposals" competition.

It debuted at number four on the Italian FIMI Albums Chart; one year after its release, it peaked at number one.

== Track listing ==
| No. | Title | Writer(s) | Length |
|---|---|---|---|
| 1. | "Buon viaggio" | Niccolò Moriconi | 3:11 |
| 2. | "Canzone stupida" | Moriconi | 3:56 |
| 3. | "La stella più fragile dell'universo" | Moriconi | 3:46 |
| 4. | "Cascare nei tuoi occhi" | Moriconi | 3:46 |
| 5. | "Poesia senza veli" | Moriconi | 3:38 |
| 6. | "Il ballo delle incertezze" | Moriconi | 3:23 |
| 7. | "Peter Pan (Vuoi volare con me?)" | Moriconi | 3:46 |
| 8. | "Dove il mare finisce" | Moriconi | 3:20 |
| 9. | "Le stesse cose che facevo con te" | Moriconi | 3:12 |
| 10. | "Ti dedico il silenzio" | Moriconi | 3:54 |
| 11. | "Domenica" | Moriconi | 3:10 |
| 12. | "Vorrei soltanto amarti" | Moriconi | 2:58 |
| 13. | "Il vaso" | Moriconi | 4:12 |
| 14. | "La casa di un poeta (Piano Live Studio)" | Moriconi | 3:31 |
| 15. | "Farfalla bianca (Piano Live Studio)" | Moriconi | 3:15 |
| 16. | "Forse dormirai" | Moriconi | 3:58 |
| Total length: | | | 56:56 |

== Charts ==
=== Weekly charts ===
Weekly chart performance for Peter Pan
| Chart (2018) | Peak position |
|---|---|
| Italian Albums (FIMI) | 1 |

=== Year-end charts ===
| Chart (2018) | Position |
|---|---|
| Italian Albums (FIMI) | 7 |
| Chart (2019) | Position |
| Italian Albums (FIMI) | 4 |
| Chart (2020) | Position |
| Italian Albums (FIMI) | 29 |
| Chart (2021) | Position |
| Italian Albums (FIMI) | 69 |
| Chart (2022) | Position |
| Italian Albums (FIMI) | 72 |

== Certifications ==
| Region | Certification | Certified units/sales |
|---|---|---|
| Italy (FIMI) | 6× Platinum | 300,000^{‡} |
^{‡} Sales+streaming figures based on certification alone.
