= Altrove (song) =

Single by Ultimo

from the album Altrove
- Released: 10 May 2024
- Genre: Dance-pop; pop rock
- Length: 3:25
- Label: Ultimo Records
- Songwriter: Niccolò Moriconi
- Producers: Ultimo; Katoo

Ultimo singles chronology
"L'ultima poesia" (2024)	"Altrove" (2024)	"Neve al sole" (2024)

Music video
- "Altrove" on YouTube

"Altrove" (transl. Elsewhere) is a song by Italian singer-songwriter Ultimo. It was released on 10 May 2024 by Ultimo Records as the second single from the sixth studio album of the same name.

== Description ==
The song is written and composed by the singer-songwriter himself, who also took care of the production with Francesco Catitti, aka Katoo, and is dedicated to his girlfriend Jacqueline Luna Di Giacomo.

== Music video ==
The music video, directed by YouNuts!, a duo composed of Antonio Usbergo and Niccolò Celaia, was released to coincide with the song's release on the singer-songwriter's YouTube channel and stars Ultimo himself with his girlfriend Jacqueline Luna Di Giacomo.

== Charts ==
=== Weekly charts ===
Weekly chart performance for "Altrove"
Chart (2024)	Peak position
Italy (FIMI)	13
Italy Airplay (EarOne)	17

=== Year-end charts ===
2024 year-end chart performance for "Altrove"
Chart (2024)	Position
Italy (FIMI)	40

== Certifications ==
Certifications for "Altrove"
Region	Certification	Certified units/sales
Italy (FIMI)	Platinum	100,000^{‡}
^{‡} Sales+streaming figures based on certification alone.
