= I tuoi particolari =

Single by Ultimo

from the album Colpa delle favole
- Released: 6 February 2019
- Studio: Enemies Lab, Rome (Italy), 2018
- Genre: Pop
- Length: 3:39
- Label: Honiro
- Songwriter: Niccolò Moriconi
- Producer: Enemies

Ultimo singles chronology
"Ti dedico il silenzio" (2018)	"I tuoi particolari" (2019)	"Fateme cantà" (2019)

Music video
- "I tuoi particolari" on YouTube

"I tuoi particolari" (transl. Your details) is a song by Italian singer-songwriter Ultimo. It was released on 6 February 2019 by Honiro as the first single from the third studio album Colpa delle favole. The song competed in the Sanremo Music Festival 2019, placing 2nd.

== Description ==
In this song, the Roman singer-songwriter talks about the little things, the hidden details of a relationship that then emerge in memories and show the importance they had when they are no longer present. The emphasis is therefore placed on absence and on a finished story, and the minor details are those that are missed the most. The song develops from piano and voice until reaching a greater intensity with the entry of the other instruments.

Ultimo describes the song thus:

"I tuoi particolari" talks about the little things, highlights the nuances, like in a painting, where every touch of color, every stroke is important."

And he added:

"The story of the end of a relationship, where the hardest part to accept are the habits that can no longer be lived."

== Music video ==
The music video, directed and written by Emanuele Pisano, was released in conjunction with the song's release on Honiro's YouTube channel. The video tells the story of a boy's love for a girl through a long journey through time and the world from 1919 to 2019. These images are mixed with those of Ultimo playing and singing his song on the piano in a room.

== Charts ==
=== Weekly charts ===
Weekly chart performance for "I tuoi particolari"
Chart (2019)	Peak position
Italy (FIMI)	2
Italy Airplay (EarOne)	6
Switzerland (Schweizer Hitparade)	48

=== Year-end charts ===
2019 year-end chart performance for "I tuoi particolari"
Chart (2019)	Position
Italy (FIMI)	10

== Certifications ==
Certifications for "I tuoi particolari"
Region	Certification	Certified units/sales
Italy (FIMI)	4× Platinum	280,000^{‡}
^{‡} Sales+streaming figures based on certification alone.
