= Zen Circus =

Italian rock band

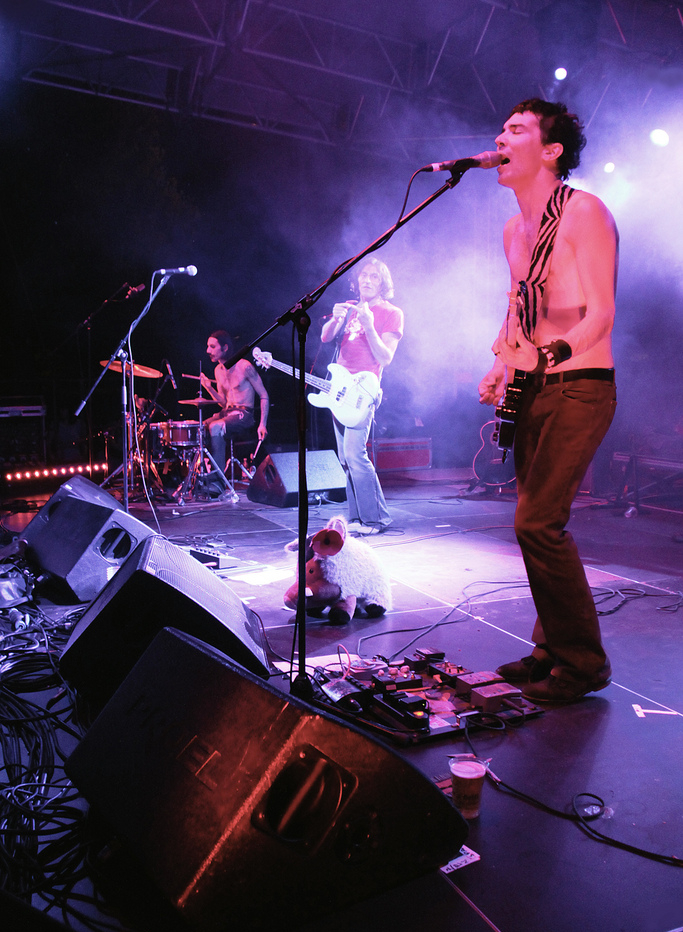

Background information
- Origin: Pisa, Italy
- Genres: Folk punk; punk rock
- Years active: 1994–present
- Labels: La Tempesta; Iceforeveryone Records
- Members: Andrea Appino; Massimiliano "Ufo" Schiavelli; Karim Qqru; Francesco "Il Maestro" Pellegrini
- Website: thezencircus.it

Zen Circus is an Italian rock band founded in 1994 by Andrea Appino and Marcello Bruzzi in Pisa. As of 2019, in addition to founding member, lead singer, guitarist and harmonica player Appino, the band consists of Massimiliano "Ufo" Schiavelli (bass guitar and backing vocals), Karim Qqru (drums and backing vocals), and Francesco "Il Maestro" Pellegrini (guitar, backing vocals).

After releasing the self-produced album About Thieves, Farmers, Tramps and Policemen in 1998 as The Zen, the band changed its name to Zen Circus, a mashup between the titles of the albums Zen Arcade and Metal Circus by American rock band Hüsker Dü.

Their first official album, titled Visited by the Ghost of Blind Willie Lemon Juice Namington IV, was released in 2001 by Iceforeveryone Records. As of 2019, they released eight additional albums, reaching the top ten of the FIMI Albums Chart with Canzoni contro la natura (2014), La terza guerra mondiale (2016) and Il fuoco in una stanza (2018).

== History ==
In 1994, Andrea Appino (guitar and vocals) and Marcello "Teschio" Bruzzi (drums) formed a punk rock band. They initially rehearsed in an improvised studio they set up in the squatted self-managed social center "Macchia Nera", located right in front of Appino's home in Pisa. In 1998, they debuted as The Zen with a self-produced album called About Thieves, Farmers, Tramps and Policemen. This first album resulted in the creation of a personal label, Iceforeveryone Records, through which the band released their second album. Appino was living and performing as a one-man band in the Netherlands, where most copies of the CD were subsequently sold.

Appino was forced to return home because of civil service obligations. Teschio's friend convinced him to involve a third collaborator, Massimiliano "UFO" Schiavelli. The band was then renamed "The Zen Circus." A real turning point for the band was winning the regional selection of Arezzo Wave and participating in Arezzo Wave On The Rocks. They bought a camper van, Nello, which accompanied them through Italy.

In 2001, they released their first album, Visited by the Ghost of Blind Willie Lemon Juice Namington IV. In 2003, Teschio, left the band and was replaced by a fan of Zen Circus, Karim Qqru. After the arrival of the new member, they released their third album Doctor Seduction in 2004 and thanks to their superlative live performances, the band become one of the paramount names in the Italian rock scene.

The album contains the ballad "Sweet Me," produced in collaboration with the Rivoli Group, and "Sailing Song," often shown in video rotations on music TV. The album was well received by fans and critics and the Doctor Seduction Tour was a success. Other highlights for the year included appearances on TV programs with Pelù, Modena City Ramblers and Pierpaolo Capovilla. However, the success was marred with financial problems.

In 2005, the band published and recorded Vita e opinioni di Nello Scarpellini, gentiluomo in analog, with the first few tracks sung in Italian. After a trip to Paris to record the video of Les poches Sont Les Gens Sont Fous Vides, The Zen Circus Tour departed for Scarpellini in 2005 and 2006.

In January 2006, the band celebrated their tenth anniversary with a mega-concert at Club Metarock in Pisa. Immediately after the celebrations, Appino undertook a four-day mini-tour to present his solo songs. During the tour, Appino shared the stage with the Violent Femmes. After this meeting, Brian Ritchie (bassist for the Violent Femmes) decided to produce their next album, and joined as a fourth member. This collaboration led to Villa Inferno (2008, Unhip), an album that included guest performances by Kim and Kelley Deal (Pixies, Breeders), Jerry Harrison (Modern Lovers, Talking Heads), and Giorgio Canali (CSI, Rossofuoco ).

In 2008, Appino appeared in the video promo for Linea 77's "The New Italian Music". The subsequent tour involved more than 100 gigs in Italy and other parts of Europe and even Australia.

In 2009, the band released their sixth album titled Andate tutti affanculo (Unhip / Storm), which contained songs sung entirely in Italian. Andate tutti affanculo was acclaimed as one of the best albums of the year, and appeared on the cover of September's monthly musical The Wild Bunch. The album also took part in the song "Nada Blanks". Appino, UFOs and Qqru collaborated with the singer Tuscany in the recording of his last solo album [2]. UFO and Qqru also participated in the 2009 project "Il paese è reale" designed by Manuel Agnelli of Afterhours, which involved their unreleased track "Gente di merda" included in the compilation" Afterhours presents: "The Country is Real (19 artists for a better country?)." At the 2010 Italian Independent Music Awards, Zen Circus won the award for "Best Tour", due to their 110 tour dates. On 2 March 2011, the band loaded a documentary by Annapaola Martin on their YouTube channel celebrating the 10 years of the Zen Circus. The documentary announced to fans the band's decision to re-release their first four albums. Villa Inferno and Vita e opinioni di Nello Scarpellini, gentiluomo were re-released by La Tempesta Records, while Doctor Seduction and Visited by the Ghost of Blind Willie Lemon Juice Namington IV were re-released by Black Candy Records. On 11 October 2011, the band released the album Nati per subire. After a week, the album rose to number 31 on sales ranking official FIMI.

The Zen Circus performed live in Florence on 14 April 2012, during their "Busking Tour". The Busking Tour ran from 16 March 2012 to 5 May 2012, during which the band played acoustic versions of their songs. On 21 April 2012, the band released Metal Arcade Vol 1, the first of four punk rock EPs.

== Discography ==
Studio albums

- 2001 – Visited by the Ghost of Blind Willie Lemon Juice Namington IV (Iceforeveryone Records)
- 2004 – Doctor Seduction (Le Parc Music, Linfa Records)
- 2005 – Vita e opinioni di Nello Scarpellini, gentiluomo (I dischi de l'amico immaginario)
- 2008 – Villa Inferno (Unhip Records) – with Brian Ritchie
- 2009 – Andate tutti affanculo (Unhip Records, La Tempesta Dischi)
- 2011 – Nati per subire (La Tempesta Dischi)
- 2014 – Canzoni contro la natura (La Tempesta Dischi)
- 2016 – La terza guerra mondiale (La Tempesta Dischi)
- 2018 – Il fuoco in una stanza (Woodworm Label, La Tempesta Dischi)
- 2020 – L'ultima casa accogliente (Woodworm, La Tempesta Dischi)
- 2025 – Il Male (Carosello Records)

as The Zen

- 1998 – About Thieves, Farmers, Tramps and Policemen (self-released)

EPs

- Metal Arcade Vol. 1 (2012)

Andrea Appino solo album

- 2013 – Il testamento (La Tempesta Dischi, Universal Music)
- 2015 – Grande raccordo animale (Picicca Dischi, La Tempesta Dischi, Sony Music)

Andrea Appino EP

- 2013 – Il lavoro mobilita l'uomo (Woodworm Label, Audioglobe)
