= Buongiorno vita =

Single by Ultimo

from the album Solo
- Released: 23 April 2021
- Studio: Auditoria Records, Fino Mornasco (Italy), 2021
- Genre: Pop; pop rap
- Length: 3:11
- Label: Ultimo Records
- Songwriter: Niccolò Moriconi
- Producer: Federico Nardelli

Ultimo singles chronology
"7+3" (2020)	"Buongiorno vita" (2021)	"Niente" (2021)

Music video
- "Buongiorno vita" on YouTube

"Buongiorno vita" (transl. Good morning life) is a song by Italian singer-songwriter Ultimo. It was released on 23 April 2021 by Ultimo Records as the fourth single from the fourth studio album Solo.

== Description ==
The song premiered on 22 April 2021, during Buongiorno vita - L'evento, a piano and vocal concert streamed from the Colosseum Archaeological Park. The event broke the record for tickets sold for an online concert in Italy. Ultimo felt they wrote the song out of "necessity".

== Music video ==
The music video, directed by the duo YouNuts!, composed of Antonio Usbergo and Niccolò Celaia, was released on 26 April 2021 on the Ultimo's YouTube channel and featured Italian actors Stefano Fresi and Camilla Filippi.

== Charts ==
=== Weekly charts ===
Weekly chart performance for "Buongiorno vita"
Chart (2021)	Peak position
Italy (FIMI)	2
Italy Airplay (EarOne)	26

=== Year-end charts ===
2021 year-end chart performance for "Buongiorno vita"
Chart (2021)	Position
Italy (FIMI)	72

== Certifications ==
Certifications for "Buongiorno vita"
Region	Certification	Certified units/sales
Italy (FIMI)	2× Platinum	200,000^{‡}
^{‡} Sales+streaming figures based on certification alone.
