= Tutto questo sei tu =

Single by Ultimo

from the album Solo
- Released: 13 December 2019
- Genre: Pop; gospel; soft rock
- Length: 4:05
- Label: Honiro
- Songwriter: Niccolò Moriconi
- Producers: Enemies; Diego Calvetti

Ultimo singles chronology
| "Quando fuori piove" (2019) | "Tutto questo sei tu" (2019) | "22 settembre" (2020) |

Music video
- "Tutto questo sei tu" on YouTube

"Tutto questo sei tu" (transl. All of this is you) is a song by Italian singer-songwriter Ultimo. It was released on 13 December 2019 by Honiro as the first single from the fourth studio album Solo.

== Description ==
The song, written and produced by the singer-songwriter himself, is a ballad dedicated to a loved one, whose presence gives meaning to even the smallest things. This dream, however, also brings with it the fear that it may be lost and that love may fade away due to distance. The song builds toward the end with a crescendo of sounds, featuring a gospel choir.

The singer-songwriter also spoke about the single as follows:

It's a song that marks the beginning of a new musical journey for me. In this period where everything seems disposable, my hope is to work on something that will last. But it's all in your hands, and I'd say that seeing the extraordinary results, I'm in extremely welcoming hands.

== Promotion ==
The song was previewed by the same on 12 December 2019 during the final of the thirteenth edition of the talent show X Factor.

== Music video ==
The music video, born from an idea of the singer-songwriter himself and directed by Emanuele Pisano, It was released on 18 December 2019 through the Ultimo's YouTube channel and featured Italian actors Edoardo Leo and Vittoria Puccini.

On 12 March 2020, the live video of the acoustic version of the song at Capitol Records Studios in Los Angeles was published on the same YouTube channel.

== Commercial success ==
In Italy, the song was the 59th most played on radio in 2020.

== Charts ==
=== Weekly charts ===
Weekly chart performance for "Tutto questo sei tu"
| Chart (2019) | Peak position |
|---|---|
| Italy (FIMI) | 1 |
| Italy Airplay (EarOne) | 5 |

=== Year-end charts ===
2020 year-end chart performance for "Tutto questo sei tu"
| Chart (2020) | Position |
|---|---|
| Italy (FIMI) | 59 |

== Certifications ==
Certifications for "Tutto questo sei tu"
| Region | Certification | Certified units/sales |
|---|---|---|
| Italy (FIMI) | 2× Platinum | 140,000^{‡} |
^{‡} Sales+streaming figures based on certification alone.
