= Ti va di stare bene =

Single by Ultimo

from the album Alba
- Released: 28 October 2022
- Studio: IlMotoreDellAuto! Studio (Fiumicello Villa Vicentina)
- Genre: Pop rock
- Length: 3:33
- Label: Ultimo Records
- Songwriter: Niccolò Moriconi
- Producers: Ultimo; Andrea Rigonat

Ultimo singles chronology
"Vieni nel mio cuore" (2022)	"Ti va di stare bene" (2022)	"Alba" (2022)

Music video
- "Ti va di stare bene" on YouTube

Ti va di stare bene (transl. Do you want to feel good?) is a song by Italian singer-songwriter Ultimo. It was released on 28 October 2022 by Ultimo Records as the second single from the fifth studio album Alba.

== Description ==
The song was written and composed by the singer-songwriter himself, who also took care of the production with Andrea Rigonat.

== Music video ==
The music video, directed by Renato De Blasio, was released on 30 October 2023, on the Ultimo's YouTube channel. The video features footage from three dates (7, 8 and 10 July 2023) at the Stadio Olimpico in Rome as part of the Ultimo Stadi 2023 - La favola continua... tour.

== Charts ==
Weekly chart performance for "Ti va di stare bene"
Chart (2022)	Peak position
Italy (FIMI)	12
Italy Airplay (EarOne)	11

== Certifications ==
Certifications for "Ti va di stare bene"
Region	Certification	Certified units/sales
Italy (FIMI)	Platinum	100,000^{‡}
^{‡} Sales+streaming figures based on certification alone.
