= Alba (Ultimo song) =

Single by Ultimo

from the album Alba
- Released: 8 February 2023
- Genre: Pop
- Length: 3:30
- Label: Ultimo Records
- Songwriter: Niccolò Moriconi
- Producers: Ultimo; Federico Nardelli

Ultimo singles chronology
"Ti va di stare bene" (2022)	"Alba" (2023)	"Nuvole in testa" (2023)

Music video
- "Alba" on YouTube

"Alba" (transl. Sunrise) is a song by Italian singer-songwriter Ultimo. It was released on 8 February 2023 by Ultimo Records as the third single from the fifth studio album of the same name.

The song was performed in competition at the 73rd edition of the Sanremo Music Festival, where it finished in fourth place.

== Description ==
The song, written and composed by the singer-songwriter himself with Federico Nardelli producing, was described by the artist in an interview with Corriere della Sera:

Two years ago, I wrote a line: "I love the dawn because it's as if it were mine alone." This summer, I was in the Aeolian Islands, at the port, and it wasn't dawn yet, to be honest. But starting from that line, which was already in my head, the song came to me. I believe in it. I was a conduit. I wrote it, but I didn't really write it. I was swept through the song. [...] It's a song with a particular structure. It has a continuous ascent, which is like breathing. Among other things, I also wanted to include a recording of my heartbeat. It's an ethereal, almost abstract journey. When I sing it, I feel like I'm "entering time".

== Reception ==
Valentina Colosimo of Vanity Fair Italia states that the song features an "omnipresent piano, with a crescendo of emotion and pathos", although it "doesn't seem to explode". Gianni Sibilla of Rockol calls the song a "classic" that "starts with piano and voice, then builds and plays on dynamics and interpretative pathos", although "it's not surprising". Rolling Stone Italia, giving it a score of 3 out of 10, writes that the song expresses "all the old-fashionedness of Sanremo", proposing a "sappy, sentimental style, always very serious and shouted", concluding that it represents "the Italian pop we'd rather not listen to, not even from someone who has any talent".

Fabio Fiume of All Music Italia gives it a score of 5 out of 10, because the verses "are quite reminiscent of the structure of Federico Zampaglione's writing" and "the crescendo is starting to feel a bit stale, a bit repetitive", finding that musically it has taken "a step back" from recent productions. Andrea Conti of il Fatto Quotidiano writes that the song has "an unmistakable trademark" with a sound "that revolves around itself to open up towards the finale".

== Music video ==
The music video, shot at the Bosco di Foglino in Nettuno and directed by Antonio Usbergo, Daniele Barbiero and Antonio Giampaolo, was made available to coincide with the song's release on the Ultimo's YouTube channel.

== Charts ==
=== Weekly charts ===
Weekly chart performance for "Alba"
Chart (2023)	Peak position
Italy (FIMI)	9
Italy Airplay (EarOne)	20
Switzerland (Schweizer Hitparade)	56

=== Year-end charts ===
2023 year-end chart performance for "Alba"
Chart (2023)	Position
Italy (FIMI)	55

== Certifications ==
Certifications for "Alba"
Region	Certification	Certified units/sales
Italy (FIMI)	2× Platinum	200,000^{‡}
^{‡} Sales+streaming figures based on certification alone.
