= Ultimo (singer) =

Italian singer-songwriter (born 1996)

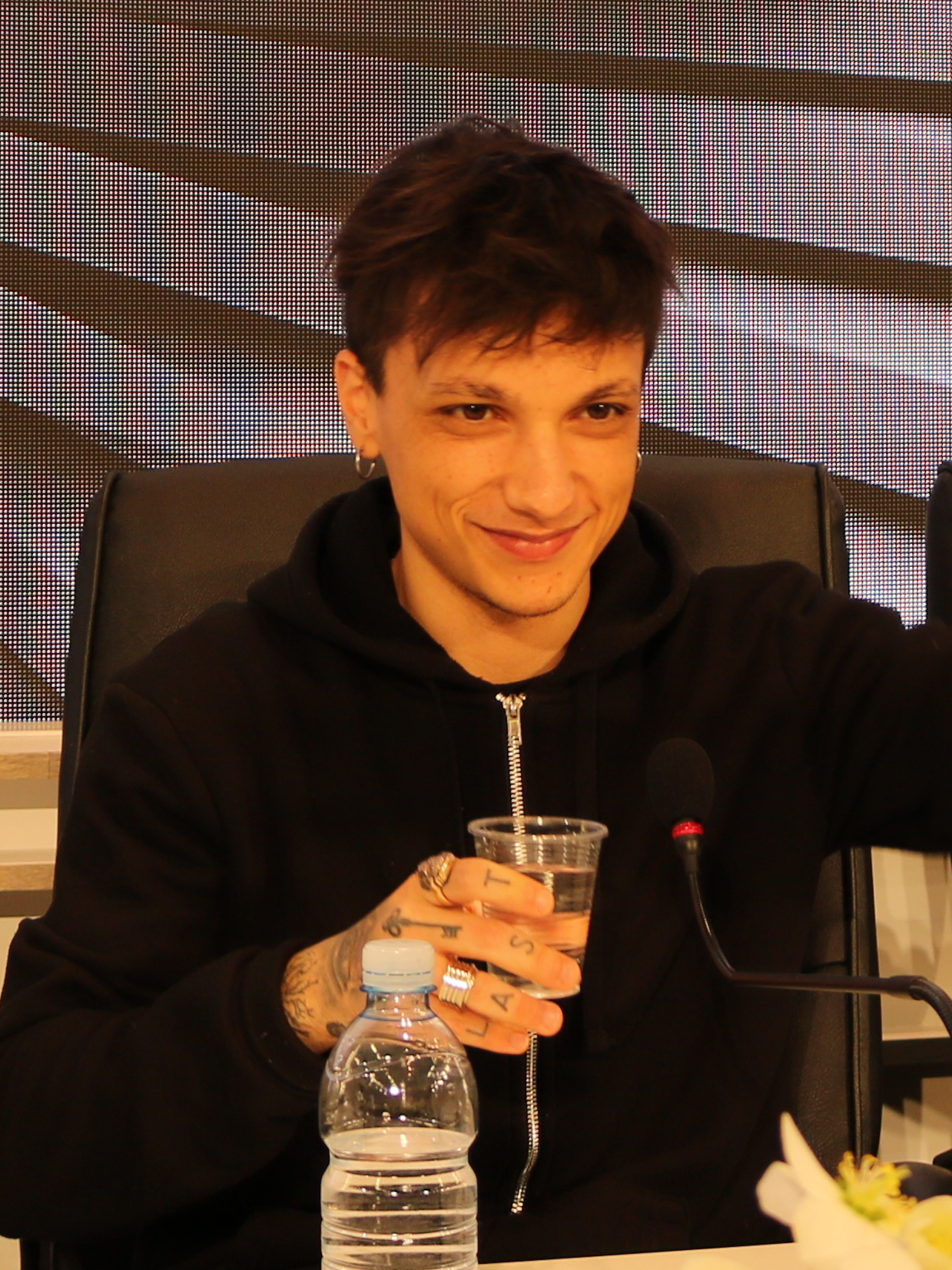
- Ultimo in 2018

Background information
- Born: Niccolò Moriconi; 27 January 1996 (age 30); Rome, Italy
- Genres: Pop
- Occupation: Singer-songwriter
- Instruments: Vocals; guitar; piano
- Works: Discography
- Years active: 2016–present
- Labels: Honiro (2016–2020); Ultimo Records (2020–present)
- Website: www.ultimostorepage.com

Niccolò Moriconi (born 27 January 1996), know professionally as Ultimo (Italian for 'Last'), is an Italian singer-songwriter. In 2018 winner of the Sanremo Music Festival in the Newcomers category and runner-up of the Sanremo Music Festival 2019 in the Big Artists section.

== Biography ==
=== Early beginnings ===
Niccolò Moriconi was born in Rome, where he began studying piano at age eight and writing songs at age fourteen. Since then he started to perform in clubs across Rome together with other independent artists like Tommaso Paradiso and Motta; he also tried to enter the main Italian talent shows Amici and X Factor, failing.

=== 2017: Pianeti ===
In 2016, he won the hip hop music competition "One Shot Game," promoted by the independent record company Honiro Label, which began to produce the singer shortly after. On 10 March 2017 he published his first single, "Chiave". The following singles were "Ovunque tu sia" and "Sabbia". On 26 May 2017 he opened Fabrizio Moro's concert in Rome. On 6 ottobre 2017 he published his first album, Pianeti, together with the same-title single. The album debuted at No. 47, but peaked at No. 5 two years after; in 2019 it was certified 2× Platinum, which means it sold more than 100,000 copies. Later on he released the single "Stasera".

=== 2018: Peter Pan and Sanremo ===
On 15 December 2017, during Sarà Sanremo, he was confirmed as a participant of the Sanremo Music Festival 2018 in the "new proposal" category with the song "Il ballo delle incertezze". He won the contest and received the Premio Lunezia. On 9 February 2018, the same day he won, he published his second album Peter Pan. The album went No. 4 in the Italian chart and after one year it peaked at No.1; in 2021 it was certified 5× Platinum, selling more than 250,000 copies. On 4 May 2018 he began the "Peter Pan tour", which went sold out, and later on he added the appendix "Esageriamo?", four concerts in indoor arenas. From the album Peter Pan he later published the singles "Poesia senza veli", "Cascare nei tuoi occhi" and "Ti dedico il silenzio".

=== 2019: Colpa delle favole ===
In 2019 he competed for the first time in the "Big" category in the Sanremo Festival with the song "I tuoi particolari", resulting in second place. On 22 February he published the single "Fateme cantà", entirely in Romanesco dialect. On the 5 April he both published the single "Rondini al guinzaglio" and his third album Colpa delle favole. The album debuted at No. 1, and kept this position for five consecutive weeks. In 2020 it was certified 4× Platinum for more than 200,000 copies sold, and it was also nominated for IMPALA's European Independent Album of the Year Award (2019). On 25 April he began the "Colpa delle Favole tour" in the main indoor arenas across Italy, being the youngest singer to do so. On 4 July he held the concert "La favola" at the Olympic Stadium in Rome in front of more than 63,000 people, becoming the youngest singer in Italy to perform in a stadium. After that he announced a tour in the main Italian stadiums, being the final concert in the Circo Massimo; for this tour he sold more than 120,000 tickets in the first 24 hours. From Colpa delle favole he later released the singles "Ipocondria", "Piccola stella" and "Quando fuori piove".

On 13 December 2019 he released the single "Tutto questo sei tu", which debuted at No.1. The song was performed during the final of X Factor 13. On January FIMI announced that Colpa delle favole was the album which sold more copies in Italy during 2019.

=== 2021: Solo ===
In September 2020 Ultimo left Honiro to start his new independent label, Ultimo Records. The first single published with it was "22 settembre". On 22 December he released the song "7+3". On 22 February 2021 he published the cover of "I giardini di marzo" by Lucio Battisti, recorded in Los Angeles. On 23 April he released the single "Buongiorno vita". The song was performed for the first time the day before during an acoustic live streaming concert at Colosseum in Rome, called "Buongiorno vita - L'evento". This event sold the largest number of tickets for an online concert in Italy. On 15 October he released the single "Niente". In January 2022, FIMI announces that Ultimo is the artist who has been present for more weeks (149) in the chart in 2021, with a record of four simultaneous albums in the annual chart: Solo at the 14th position, Colpa delle favole at the 48th, Peter Pan at the 69th and Pianeti at the 90th.

=== 2023: return to Sanremo ===
On 4 December 2022, it was officially announced that Ultimo would participate in the Sanremo Music Festival 2023. "Alba" was later announced as his entry for the Sanremo Music Festival 2023. He later qualified for the final five of the festival, placing in 4th position in the final table.

== Discography ==
- Pianeti (2017)
- Peter Pan (2018)
- Colpa delle favole (2019)
- Solo (2021)
- Alba (2023)
- Altrove (2024)
- Il giorno che aspettavo (2026)
