= Ana Mena discography =

Discography of Spanish singer-songwriter and actress Ana Mena

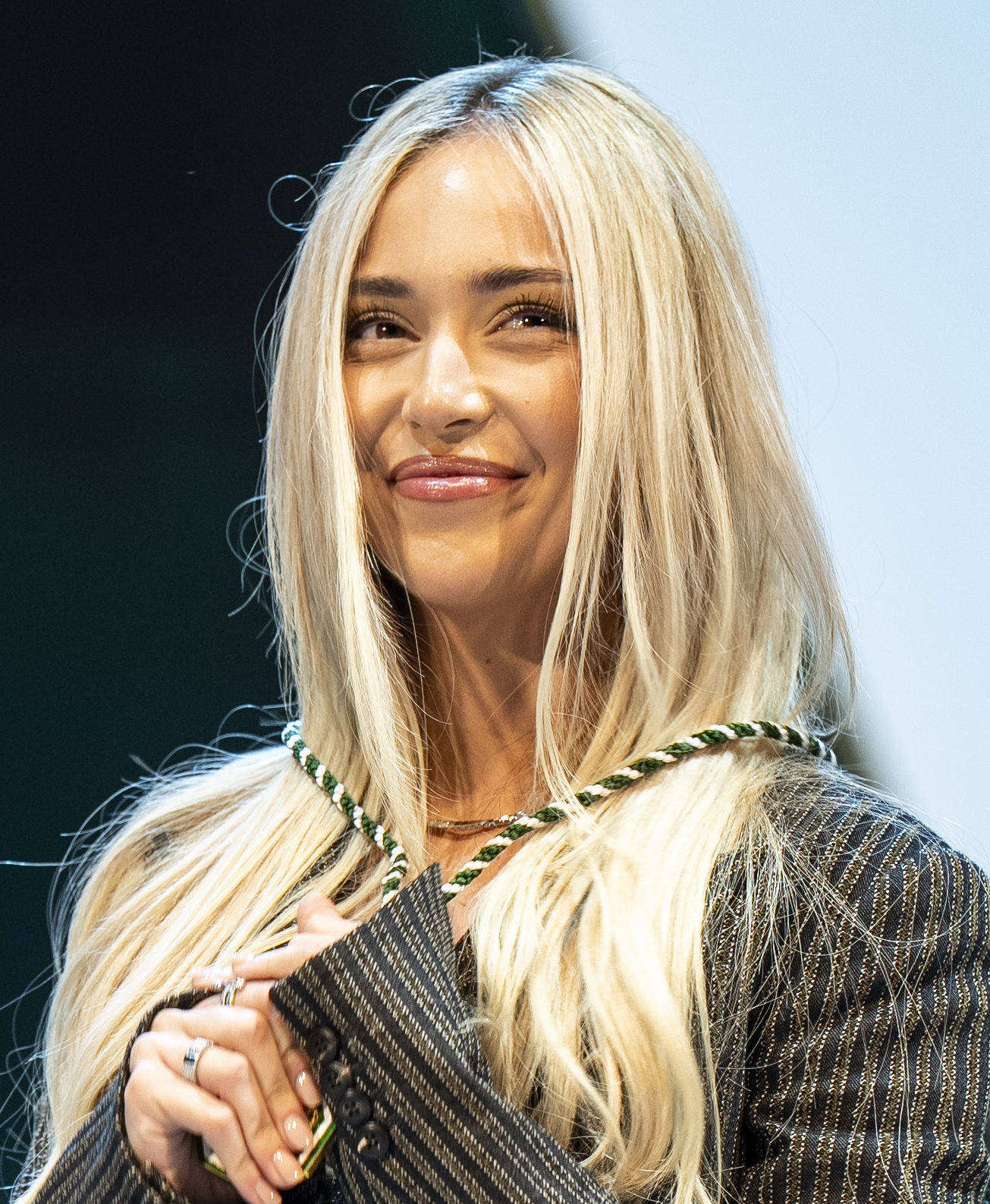
- Ana Mena in February 2026
- Studio albums: 2
- Singles: 36

The discography of Spanish recording artist Ana Mena consists of two studio albums, and thirty-six singles.

== Studio albums ==
List of studio albums, with selected details and chart positions
Title	Studio album details	Peaks	Certifications
Title	Studio album details	SPA	Certifications
Índex	Released: 11 May 2018; Label: Sony Spain; Format: CD, digital download	9	
Bellodrama	Released: 24 March 2023; Label: Sony Spain; Format: CD, LP, digital download	1	PROMUSICAE: Platinum

== Singles ==
=== As lead artist ===
List of singles as lead artist, with selected chart positions and certifications, showing year released and album name
Title	Year	Peaks					Certifications	Album
Title	Year	SPA	ARG	FRA	ITA	SWI	Certifications	Album
"No Soy Como Tú Crees"	2016	—	—	—	—	—		Index
"Loco Como Yo"	2016	—	—	—	—	—		Index
"Se Fue"	2016	—	—	—	—	—		Index
"Ahora Lloras Tú" (featuring CNCO)	2017	78	—	—	—	—	PROMUSICAE: Gold	Index
"Mentira" (featuring RK)	2017	—	—	—	—	—		Index
"Ya Es Hora" (with Becky G and De La Ghetto)	2018	29	—	—	—	—	PROMUSICAE: Platinum	Index
"Pa' Dentro" (featuring Sean Kingston)	2018	—	—	—	—	—		Non-album singles
"El Chisme" (with Nio Garcia and Emilia)	2019	—	—	—	—	—		Non-album singles
"Se Te Olvidó" (with Deorro)	2019	—	—	—	—	—		Non-album singles
"Ahí" (with Thalía)	2019	—	—	—	—	—		Valiente
"Como El Agua" (Remix) (with Omar Montes)	2019	81	—	—	—	—	PROMUSICAE: Gold	Non-album singles
"Sin Aire"	2020	—	—	—	—	—		Non-album singles
"La Pared" (with Dellafuente)	2020	68	—	—	—	—		Non-album singles
"A un passo dalla luna" (Note: "A un passo dalla luna" was released in Spanish as "A Un Paso de la Luna".) (with Rocco Hunt and remix with Reik)	2020	4	—	11	1	31	PROMUSICAE: 6× Platinum; PROMUSICAE: Gold (Remix); FIMI: 6× Platinum; SNEP: Diamond; IFPI SWI: Platinum; AMPROFON: Gold	Rivoluzione and Bellodrama
"Solo" (with Omar Montes and Maffio)	2021	7	—	—	—	—	PROMUSICAE: 3× Platinum	Eso Es Mental
"Un bacio all'improvviso" (Note: "Un bacio all'improvviso" was released in Spanish as "Un beso de improviso".) (with Rocco Hunt)	2021	55	—	—	4	—	PROMUSICAE: 3× Platinum; FIMI: 4× Platinum	Rivoluzione
"Sol y Mar" (with Federico Rossi)	2021	—	—	—	—	—		Non-album single
"Música Ligera"	2021	11	—	—	—	—	PROMUSICAE: 3× Platinum	Bellodrama
"Duecentomila ore" (Note: "Duecentomila ore" was released in Spanish as "Cuando la noche arriba".)	2022	90	—	—	18	—	PROMUSICAE: Gold; FIMI: Gold	Non-album single
"Quiero Decirte" (with Abraham Mateo)	2022	10	99	—	87	—	PROMUSICAE: 4× Platinum	Insomnio
"Mezzanotte" / "Las 12" (solo or Spanish version with Belinda)	2022	7	—	—	85	—	PROMUSICAE: 7× Platinum; AMPROFON: Gold; FIMI: Gold	Bellodrama
"Un Clásico"	2023	53	—	—	—	—	PROMUSICAE: 2× Platinum	Bellodrama
"Me He Pillao x Ti" (featuring Natalia Lacunza)	2023	52	—	—	—	—	PROMUSICAE: Gold	Bellodrama
"Lentamente"	2023	72	—	—	—	—		Bellodrama
"Acquamarina" (featuring Gué Pequeno)	2023	—	—	—	—	—		Non-album singles
"Melodia Criminal" (Note: "Melodia Criminal" was released in Spanish as "Criminal".) (with Fred De Palma)	2023	—	—	—	48	—	FIMI: Gold	Non-album singles
"Madrid City"	2023	8	—	107	—	—	PROMUSICAE: 4× Platinum; SNEP: Gold	Non-album singles
"La Razón" (with Gale)	2024	78	—	—	—	—	PROMUSICAE: Gold	Non-album singles
"Cinema spento" (Note: "Cinema spento" is the Italian version of "Ben & Jerry's", from her 2023 album Bellodrama.) (featuring Dargen D'Amico)	2024	—	—	—	—	—		Non-album singles
"Carita Triste" (with Emilia)	2024	6	18	—	—	—	PROMUSICAE: Platinum; CAPIF: Gold	Non-album singles
"Como Amigos" (with Miranda!)	2024	—	92	—	—	—		Nuevo Hotel Miranda!
"Lárgate"	2025	31	—	—	—	—		TBA
"Pa Ti Toa" (with Lola Índigo)	2026	3	— (Note: "Pa Ti Toa" did not enter the Billboard Argentina Hot 100, but it peaked at number seven on the Monitor Latino Argentina Airplay chart.)	—	—	—	PROMUSICAE: 2× Platinum	TBA
"—" denotes a recording that did not chart or was not released in that territory.

=== As featured artist ===
List of singles as featured artist, with selected chart positions, showing year released and album name
Title	Year	Peaks				Certifications	Album
Title	Year	SPA	ITA	MEX Pop	SWI	Certifications	Album
"Dama y Vagabundo" (Bromas Aparte featuring Ana Mena)	2016	—	—	—	—		Non-album singles
"No soy el mismo" (Xriz featuring Ana Mena)	2017	—	—	—	—		Non-album singles
"Quiero" (Critica y Saik featuring Ana Mena)	2017	—	—	—	—		Non-album singles
"Prohibido (Remix)" (CD9 featuring Lali and Ana Mena)	2018	—	—	16	—		1.0
"D'estate non vale" (Fred De Palma featuring Ana Mena)	2018	—	6	—	—	FIMI: 3× Platinum	Uebe
"Una volta ancora" (Note: "Una volta ancora" was released in Spanish as "Se Iluminaba".) (Fred De Palma featuring Ana Mena)	2019	6	1	—	61	PROMUSICAE: Gold; PROMUSICAE: 5× Platinum ("Se Iluminaba"); FIMI: 7× Platinum	Uebe and Bellodrama
"Me Quedo" (Nil Moliner featuring Ana Mena)	2021	98	—	—	—	PROMUSICAE: Platinum	Non-album single
"—" denotes a recording that did not chart or was not released in that territory.

=== Promotional singles ===
List of promotional singles, showing year released and album name
Title	Year	Album
"Te Falta Veneno (Version 2017)"	2017	Non-album promotional single
"Aprendí a Olvidar" (featuring Solero)	2018	Index
"Te Deseo Lo Mejor"	2018	Index
"La Gata Bajo la Lluvia"	2024	Non-album promotional single

== Guest appearances ==
List of other album appearances
Title	Year	Other artist(s)	Album
"Mama"	2017	Matt Terry	Trouble
"Ahí"	2018	Thalía	Valiente
"Senza niente da dire"	2022	Jake La Furia	Ferro del mestiere
"Ave de paso"	2022	Pablo Alborán	La Cuarta Hoja
"Viva el amor!"	2023	Paola e Chiara	Per sempre
"Scrivimi con la tua voce"	2023	Federica Abbate	Canzoni per gli altri

== Footnotes ==
Notes for peak chart positions
