= Mi Movimiento =

Studio album by De la Ghetto
- Released: September 28, 2018
- Recorded: 2017–2018
- Genre: Reggaeton; Latin trap; dancehall
- Length: 63:22
- Label: Warner Music Latina
- Producer: Chris Jedi; Gaby Music; BF; Sky Rompiendo; DJ Luian; Mambo Kingz; Kreate; Oby "The One"; Super Solo; Chan El Genio; Kevin Adg; DJ Blass; Predikador; Rome; Urba; Tainy; DJ Giann; Jazz; Lelo; Russian; Sniggy; DJ Diego; Play-N-Skillz

De la Ghetto chronology
Masacre Musical (2008)	Mi Movimiento (2018)	Los Chulitos (2020)

Singles from Mi Movimiento
- 1. "La Fórmula" Released: September 15, 2017; 2. "Todo el Amor" Released: June 29, 2018; 3. "Caliente" Released: September 7, 2018

Mi Movimiento (English: My Movement) is the second studio album by American singer De la Ghetto, released on September 28, 2018, through Warner Music Latina. It was produced by Chris Jedi, Gaby Music, BF, Sky Rompiendo, DJ Luian, Mambo Kingz, Kreate, Oby "The One", Super Solo, Chan El Genio, Kevin Adg, DJ Blass, Predikador, Rome, Urba, Tainy, DJ Giann, Jazz, Lelo, Russian, Sniggy, DJ Diego and Play-N-Skillz, and features collaborations with Daddy Yankee, Ozuna, Chris Jedi, J Balvin, Maluma, Wisin, Zion & Lennox, Brytiago, Jon Z, Almighty, Flo Rida, Plan B, Konshens and Fetty Wap

At the 20th Annual Latin Grammy Awards, the album was nominated for Best Urban Music Album while the song "Caliente" was nominated for Best Urban Song.

The album peaked at number five on the Top Latin Albums and Latin Rhythm Albums charts, De la Ghetto's highest-charting album to date on both charts.

== Background ==
The album is the follow-up to De la Ghetto's debut album Masacre Musical (2008) and his third overall release when including the compilation album Geezy Boyz (2013). In 2016, he signed to Warner Music Latina after having previously worked with small labels like Premium Latin Music and Cinq Music, and announced Mi Movimiento as his next project. The album was recorded during 2017 and 2018, he has said that "I've been at this for years, and this album shows a more mature, more global De la Ghetto, but without losing its essence", the project was originally intended to be an EP but was later structured as a full album, it features mainly reggaeton, blending it with other genres in tracks like the trap "Se Que Quieres" and the vallenato-infused "Yo Soy Tuyo".

== Singles ==
The first single for the album was "La Fórmula", a collaboration with Daddy Yankee and Ozuna, released on September 15, 2017. During 2018, two more singles were released, "Todo el Amor" with Maluma and Wisin on June 29, 2018, and "Caliente" with J Balvin on September 7, 2018. All three singles entered the Latin Rhythm Airplay chart, peaking at numbers 14, 17 and 24, respectively, additionally, "La Formula" peaked at number 23 at the Hot Latin Songs chart and was certified platinum in United States.

== Track listing ==
Mi Movimiento track listing
No.	Title	Writer(s)	Producer(s)	Length
1.	"La Fórmula" (featuring Daddy Yankee, Ozuna and Chris Jedi)	Rafael Castillo Torres; Carlos Ortiz Rivera; Juan "Gaby Music" Rivera Vazquez; Juan Carlos Ozuna Rosado; Ramón Luis Ayala; Pablo Christian Fuentes	Chris Jedi; Gaby Music	3:52
2.	"Mami"	Castillo Torres; Alejandro Ramirez; Pablo Christian Fuentes	BF; Sky Rompiendo	3:28
3.	"Caliente" (featuring J Balvin)	Castillo Torres; Ramirez; José Alvaro Osorio Balvin; Rene Cano	Sky Rompiendo	3:26
4.	"Me Extrañas" (featuring Maluma and Wisin)	Castillo Torres; Edgar Semper; Luian Malavé; Pablo Christian Fuentes; Xavier Semper	BF; DJ Luian; Mambo Kingz	3:29
5.	"Todo el Amor" (featuring Maluma and Wisin)	Castillo Torres; Juan Luis Londoño Arias; Juan Luis Morera; Edgar Semper; Malavé; Fuentes; Xavier Semper	BF; DJ Luian; Mambo Kingz	3:33
6.	"Yo Soy Tuyo"	Castillo Torres; Edwin A. Morales; Edwin Díaz; Miguel Antonio De Jesús	Kreate; Oby "The One"; Super Solo	3:43
7.	"Amantes" (featuring Zion & Lennox)	Castillo Torres; Fuentes; Bryan Snaider Lezcano Chaverra; Kevin Mauricio Jiménez Londoño	Chan El Genio; Kevin Adg	3:49
8.	"Como Ella Baila"	Castillo Torres; Victor Edmundo Delgado; Vladimir Vazquez Felix	DJ Blass; Predikador	3:11
9.	"Sé Que Quieres (Remix)" (featuring Brytiago, Jon Z and Almighty)	Castillo Torres; Edgar Semper; Malavé; Fuentes; Xavier Semper; Alejandro Mosqueda; Bryan Cancel Santiago; Darell Castro; Jonathan Resto Quiñones; Wilmo Belisario Guerra	BF; DJ Luian; Mambo Kingz	4:12
10.	"Booty Grande" (featuring Flo Rida)	Castillo Torres; Ramirez; Trama Dillard; Vazquez Felix	DJ Blass; Sky Rompiendo	3:16
11.	"Forever in Love"	Castillo Torres; Fuentes; Jorge Luis Romero; Urbani Mota Cedeño	BF; Rome; Urba	4:16
12.	"No Hay Nadie"	Castillo Torres; De Jesús; Marco Efrain Masis Fernandez	Oby "The One"; Tainy	3:42
13.	"Cójelo Pa Ti" (featuring Plan B)	Castillo Torres; Fuentes; De Jesús; Díaz; Edwin Vázquez Vega; Orlando Javier Valle Vega; Emanuel Infante; Giann Francisco Arias Colon; Kristian Daniel Ginorio	BF; DJ Giann; Jazz; Lelo	4:15
14.	"Haciéndotelo"	Castilo Torres; De Jesús; Masis Fernandez	Tainy	3:44
15.	"Bad Girls" (featuring Konshens)	Castillo Torres; Garfield Delano Spence; Nikolas David Silvera; Tarik Johnston	Russian; Sniggy	2:42
16.	"Recuerdo"	Castillo Torres; Luis A. Lozada	DJ Blass; DJ Diego	4:44
17.	"F.L.Y." (featuring Fetty Wap)	Castillo Torres; Willie Maxwell II; David Macías; Emannuelle Anene; Juan Salinas; Oscar Salinas	Play-N-Skillz	4:00
Total length:				63:22

== Charts ==
Weekly chart performance for Mi Movimiento
Chart (2018)	Peak position
US Top Latin Albums (Billboard)	5
US Latin Rhythm Albums (Billboard)	5
