= De la Ghetto =

American singer (born 1984)

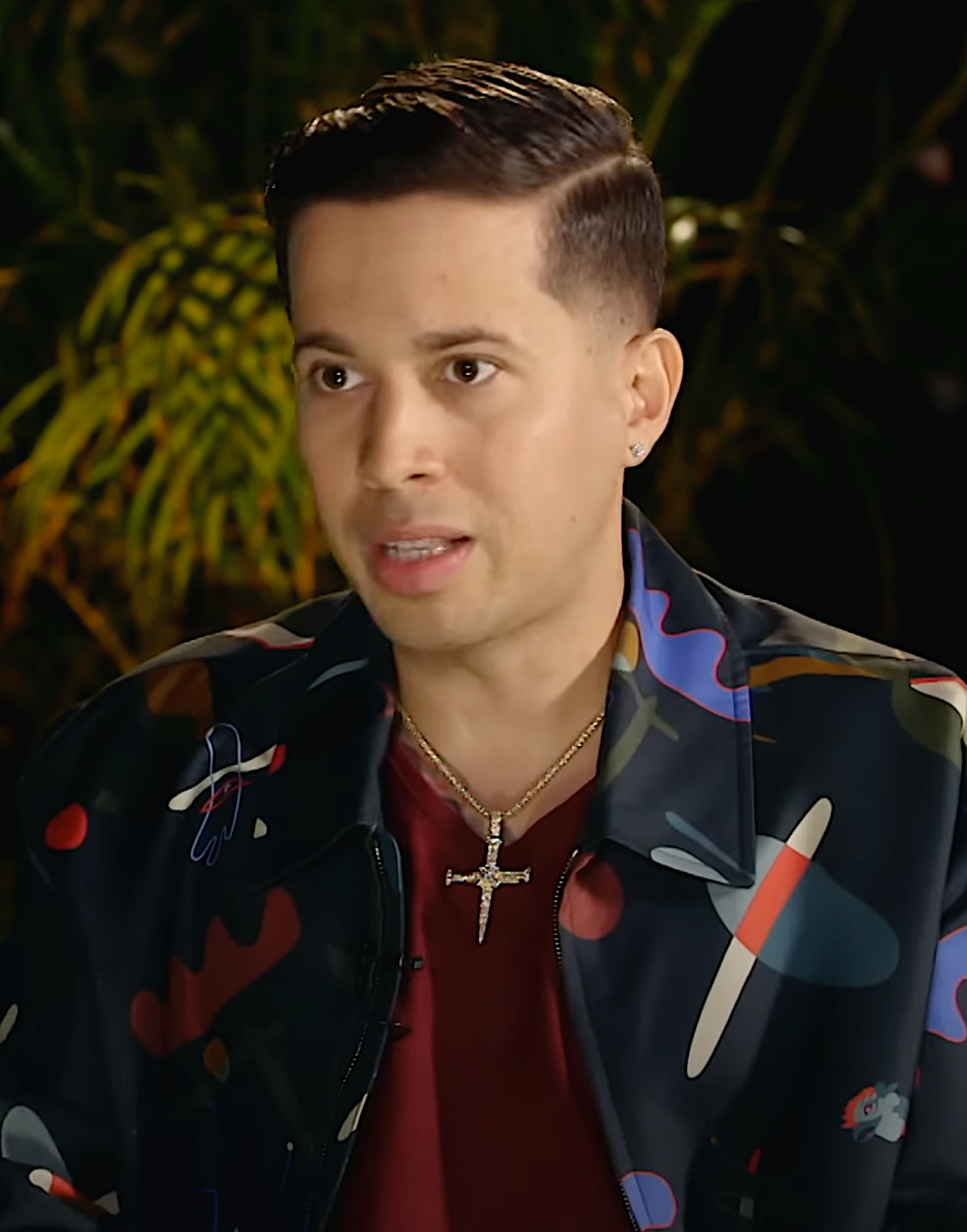
- De la Ghetto in 2020

Background information
- Also known as: De la Geezy; El Chulito; El Jefe de la Versatilidad; El Jefe del Bloque; El Rey de los Remixes
- Born: Rafael Castillo Torres; September 17, 1984 (age 42); New York City, U.S.
- Genres: Reggaeton; Latin R&B; Latin trap; urban pop
- Occupations: Rapper; singer; songwriter
- Instrument: Vocals
- Years active: 2004–present
- Labels: Masacre Musical; Sony BMG Norte; Def Jam; Warner Latina
- Formerly of: Arcángel & De la Ghetto

Rafael Castillo Torres (born September 17, 1984), known professionally as De la Ghetto, is an American singer and rapper who is the one-half member of the reggaeton duo Arcángel & De la Ghetto, alongside Arcángel. He is known for fusing reggaeton music with hip hop and trap rhythms, eventually creating Latin trap music.

== Early life ==
Rafael Castillo Torres was born in The Bronx, borough of New York, NY, on September 17, 1984, to a Dominican father, Rafael Castillo, and a Puerto Rican mother, Migdalia Torres. His father died months after he was born, while his mother was incarcerated for six years in Argentina when Castillo was around the age of eight, eventually relocating to San Juan, Puerto Rico where he lived with his grandmother.

== Career ==
In 2004, just before his twentieth birthday, Castillo met with another young reggaetón musician born in New York City by the name of Austin Santos—better known to the public as Arcángel—and the two decided to form a duo, Arcángel & De la Ghetto. The pair debuted with their single "Ven, Pégate", which was featured on Naldo's mixtape Sangre Nueva, in 2005. From there, Castillo was signed to Zion's label, Baby Records, and immediately began to make music. Castillo has appeared on numerous reggaetón compilation albums and collaborations, including the album Mas Flow: Los Benjamins. In 2006, De la Ghetto officially began his solo career, appearing the following year on two hit singles, as well: a remixed version of "Siente el Boom" by Tito el Bambino, plus a collaboration with Randy called "Sensación del Bloque", which has been viewed on YouTube over 200 million times as of July 2023. Masacre Musical was then released in 2008. Masacre Musical peaked at #46 on the Billboard Top Latin Albums chart in the U.S.; its lead single, "Tú Te Imaginas", peaked at #33 on the Billboard Hot Latin Tracks chart.

The 2018 album Mi Movimiento (my movement) was nominated in 2019 for a Latin Grammy Award for "Best Urban Music Album", and the track "Caliente" was also nominated for a Latin Grammy for "Best Urban song".

== Personal life ==
In an interview, he revealed that he is married to a woman named Verónica and that the couple have two kids together.

== Discography ==
=== Studio albums ===
- Masacre Musical (2008)
- Geezy Boyz: The Album (2013)
- Mi Movimiento (2018)
- Los Chulitos (2020)
- GZ (2023)
- Daylight (2025)

=== Mixtapes ===
- The Boss of the Block (2007)
- The Boss of the Block, Vol. 2 (2007)
- Masacre Musical Mixtape (2007)
- Masacre Musical Presents: El Movimiento (2008)
- Masacre Musical Presents: El Movimiento, Vol. II (2010)

=== Compilation albums ===
- El Jefe de la Versatilidad, Vol. 1 (2011)
- El Jefe de la Versatilidad, Vol. 2 (2011)

=== Singles ===
==== As lead artist ====
List of singles as lead artist, with chart positions, showing year released and album name
Title	Year	Peak chart positions				Album
Title	Year	US	US Latin	SPA	WW	Album
"Es Difícil"	2008	—	42	—	—	Masacre Musical
"Tú Te Imaginas"	2009	—	33	—	—	Masacre Musical
"Come Out and See" (featuring Mavado)	2009	—	—	—	—	Masacre Musical
"Lover (Remix)" featuring Juelz Santana)	2009	—	—	—	—	Masacre Musical
"Momento Que Te Vi"	2009	—	—	—	—	Masacre Musical
"Stripper Pole" (featuring J-Merk)	2009	—	—	—	—	Masacre Musical Presents: El Movimiento Vol. II
"Tapu Tapu" (with Jowell & Randy)	2010	—	—	—	—	Lost in Time
"Nocturno"	2010	—	—	—	—	Non-album single
"Jala Gatillo"	2010	—	—	—	—	Non-album single
"Tumbao" (with Wisin & Yandel)	2010	—	—	—	—	Los Vaqueros: El Regreso
"La Reunión de los Vaqueros" (with Wisin & Yandel, Franco el Gorila, Tego Calderón, Cosculluela)	2010	—	—	—	—	La Revolución Live Vol. 1
"Tú y Yo"	2010	—	—	—	—	Non-album single
"Ya Es Hora" (with Ana Mena and Becky G)	2018	—	—	—	—	Index
"F.L.Y." (featuring Fetty Wap)	2018	—	—	—	—	Mi Movimiento
"Acho PR" (with Bad Bunny, Arcángel and Ñengo Flow)	2023	83	24	22	47	Nadie Sabe Lo Que Va a Pasar Mañana

==== As featured artist ====
List of singles as featured artist, with chart positions, showing year released and album name
Title	Year	Peak	Album
Title	Year	US Latin	Album
"Aparentemente" Yaga & Mackie featuring Arcángel & De la Ghetto)	2007	42	La Reunión Callejero Flow
"Inalcanzable (remix)" (RBD featuring Jowell & Randy & De la Ghetto)	2008	—	Non-album single
"Mala Conducta (remix)" (Alexis & Fido featuring Franco el Gorila, Arcángel & De la Ghetto)	2010	—	Perreologia
"Tú Me Robaste el Corazón (Remix) (featuring Fidel Nadal)	2010	—	Mi Movimiento
"De La Calle" (with Ivy Queen)	2010	—	Drama Queen
"El Jefe" (Los Vagos featuring De la Ghetto)	2012	—	Vida Acelerada
"Actúa (remix)" (J Alvarez featuring Zion & De la Ghetto)	2012	—	Imperio Nazza: J. Alvarez Edition
"No Es Una Gial" (Farruko featuring De la Ghetto)	2013	—	Imperio Nazza: Farruko Edition
"Si Tú No Estás" (Nicky Jam featuring De la Ghetto)	2014	—	
"Nadie Como Yo" (J Alvarez featuring De la Ghetto)	2015	—	
"Bailen" (Franco el Gorila featuring De la Ghetto)	2015	—	
"Todavía Te Quiero" (Thalía featuring De la Ghetto)	2016	—	Latina
"Pide Lo Que Tú Quieras" (Ozuna featuring De la Ghetto)	2017	—	Odisea
"Tócame" (Anitta featuring Arcángel and De la Ghetto)	2020	—	Non-album singles
"Mala (Remix)" (Pitbull featuring Becky G and De la Ghetto)	2020	—	Non-album singles
"New Calle" (Doeman Dyna and De la Ghetto)	2021	—	Non-album singles
"Fardos" (JC Reyes featuring De la Ghetto)	2024	—	Non-album singles
"Morning" (Cheat Codes and Jason Derulo featuring De la Ghetto and Galantis)	2024	—	Non-album singles
