= Ya Es Hora =

2018 single by Ana Mena, Becky G and De La Ghetto

Single by Ana Mena, Becky G and De La Ghetto

from the album Index
- Language: Spanish
- English title: "It's About Time"
- Released: March 16, 2018
- Genre: Latin pop
- Length: 3:26
- Label: Sony Spain
- Songwriters: María José Fernández; David Augustave; Pablo Christian Fuentes; Rafael Castillo Torres; Bruno Nicolás; José Luis de la Peña
- Producers: Dabruk; José Luis de la Peña

Ana Mena singles chronology
"Mentira" (2017)	"Ya Es Hora" (2018)	"Pa' Dentro" (2018)

Becky G singles chronology
"Mad Love" (2018)	"Ya Es Hora" (2018)	"Sin Pijama" (2018)

De La Ghetto singles chronology
"Tu Y Yo" (2017)	"Ya Es Hora" (2018)	"F.L.Y." (2018)

Music video
- "Ya Es Hora" on YouTube

"Ya Es Hora" is a song by Spanish singer Ana Mena, and American singers Becky G and De La Ghetto. It was released by Sony Spain on 16 March 2018, as the sixth single from Mena's debut album, Index (2018).

== Live performances ==
Ana Mena and Becky G performed "Ya Es Hora" together for the first time at the Factor X on June 29, 2018.

== Charts ==
=== Weekly charts ===
Weekly chart performance for "Ya Es Hora"
Chart (2018)	Peak position
Spain (Promusicae)	29

=== Year-end charts ===
2018 year-end chart performance for "Ya Es Hora"
Chart (2018)	Position
Spain (PROMUSICAE)	81

== Certifications ==
Certifications and sales for "Ya Es Hora"
Region	Certification	Certified units/sales
Spain (Promusicae)	Platinum	40,000^{‡}
^{‡} Sales+streaming figures based on certification alone.
