= Tú Te Imaginas =

Single by De la Ghetto

from the album Masacre Musical
- Language: Spanish
- English title: "You Imagine"
- Released: 2008
- Genre: Latin R&B
- Songwriters: Rafael Castillo; Álex Ferreira; Jason Walker

De la Ghetto singles chronology
"Es Difícil" (2007)	"Tú Te Imaginas" (2008)	"Lover" (2009)

"Tú Te Imaginas" is a song by American singer De la Ghetto, released in 2008 as the second single from his debut studio album Masacre Musical (2008). It was written by Rafael Castillo, Álex Ferreira and Jason Walker.

== Charts ==
=== Weekly charts ===
Weekly chart performance for "Tú Te Imaginas"
Chart (2009)	Peak position
US Hot Latin Songs (Billboard)	33
US Latin Airplay (Billboard)	33
US Latin Rhythm Airplay (Billboard)	4
US Tropical Airplay (Billboard)	22

=== Year-end charts ===
Year-end chart performance for "Tú Te Imaginas"
Chart (2009)	Position
US Latin Rhythm Airplay (Billboard)	18

== Other versions ==
On September 5, 2018, Puerto Rican singer Rauw Alejandro published a version of the song titled "T.T.I.".
