= Bellodrama =

Studio album by Ana Mena
- Released: 24 March 2023
- Genre: Pop; nu-disco
- Length: 46:41
- Label: Sony Music Spain
- Producer: Andra Debernardi; Andrés Torres; Andy Clay; Dabruk; DJ Glass; Federico Nardelli; Giordano Colombo; Giulio Nenna; Jay Simon; Katoo; Marz; Mauricio Rengifo; Takagi & Ketra; Zef

Ana Mena chronology
Índex (2018)	Bellodrama (2023)

Singles from Bellodrama
- 1. "Música ligera" Released: 21 November 2021; 2. "Las 12" Released: 17 June 2022; 3. "Un clásico" Released: 20 January 2023; 4. "Me he pillao x ti" Released: 24 February 2023; 5. "Lentamente" Released: 24 March 2023

Bellodrama (stylized in all lowercase) is the second studio album by Spanish singer Ana Mena, released on 24 March 2023 by Sony Music Spain. The singer worked with a variety of producers and co-writers on the album, including Dabruk, Andrés Torres, Mauricio Rengifo, Takagi & Ketra, Federica Abbate, Zef and Marz, among others.

The album was preceded by the release of five singles between November 2021 and March 2023: "Música ligera", "Las 12", "Un clásico", "Me he pillao x ti" and "Lentamente". Belinda, Natalia Lacunza, Dejota2021 and Ir Sais make guest appearances in the album. The tracklist also includes the smash-hits "A un paso de la luna" with Rocco Hunt and "Se iluminaba" with Fred De Palma as bonus tracks.

The album debuted at number one on the Spanish Top 100 Albums chart, making it Mena's first number-one and second top-ten album on the chart. It was certified Gold in Spain on week 39, 2023.

== Background and release ==
After the release of her debut studio album, Índex (2018), Mena's career took off. The singer went on to release multiple collaborations with which she gathered multiple top-ten entries and even number-one peaks in Spain, Italy, France and Switzerland. These included "D'estate non vale" and "Una volta ancora" (and its Spanish version, "Se iluminaba") with Fred De Palma, "A un passo dalla luna" (or "A un paso de la luna") and "Un bacio all'improvviso" (or "Un beso de improviso") with Rocco Hunt, and "Solo" with Omar Montes and Maffio.

In November 2021, she released the album's lead single, "Música ligera", which peaked at number eleven in Spain and was certified three times platinum by Productores de Música de España (PROMUSICAE). The song interpolated "Musica leggerissima" by the Italian singers Colapesce and Dimartino, already denoting the Italian influence the album would eventually adopt. In February 2022, Mena participated in the Sanremo Music Festival 2022 with her song "Duecentomila ore". Regarding her participation, Mena expressed: "I've been trying to participate for two years. I've been following Sanremo from home since I was a teenager. I've discovered a lot of Italian artists through the festival. It is a family tradition. Although she ended up in the twenty-fourth out of twenty-five positions, the song peaked at number eighteen in Italy and received a gold certification by the Federazione Industria Musicale Italiana (FIMI). The song was also released in Spanish as "Cuando la noche arriba". Due to the success of the song in Italy, Mena released "Mezzanotte" in June 2022, which only peaked at number eighty-five in the country. However, its Spanish version featuring Belinda became a summer anthem in Spain: "Las 12" peaked at number seven and has been certified seven times platinum. In September, the singer revealed that she was working on the album's title and concept, and expressed that she would make two separate albums for her Spanish-language and Italian-language songs which would have different titles.

Mena kicked off 2023 with the release of the single "Un clásico". In February, she announced the album's title, track list and release date. This was followed by the release of "Me He Pillao x Ti" with Spanish singer Natalia Lacunza. The album was officially released on 24 March 2023 and was accompanied by the release of its fifth single, "Lentamente".

== Concept and composition ==
I needed a word that defined the aftertase that is felt when one suffers from love. I needed a word that could define that bitterness but that still had a sweet touch. That's when "bellodrama" appeared.

— Ana Mena on the album's title, Los 40

In an interview for Los 40 in September 2022, Mena revealed that she was working on the album's concept and title. As regards the latter, she expressed: "I don't want basic or descriptive titles. [I want] something concise". In Bellodrama, Mena tells "a story of love and heartbreak, a cute drama that she could get off her head." The album's title, Bellodrama, is a compound word that mixes the words "bello" (cute) and "drama", purposefully resembling the word "melodrama". In fact, Mena described the album as "a drama, but a cute one; the enjoyment of melancholia." She stated that the album pays homage to her favorite genre, that sixties-seventies pop, mixed with urban pop and bachata. She also listed Katy Perry, La Oreja de Van Gogh and Luis Miguel as influences for the record.

=== Songs ===
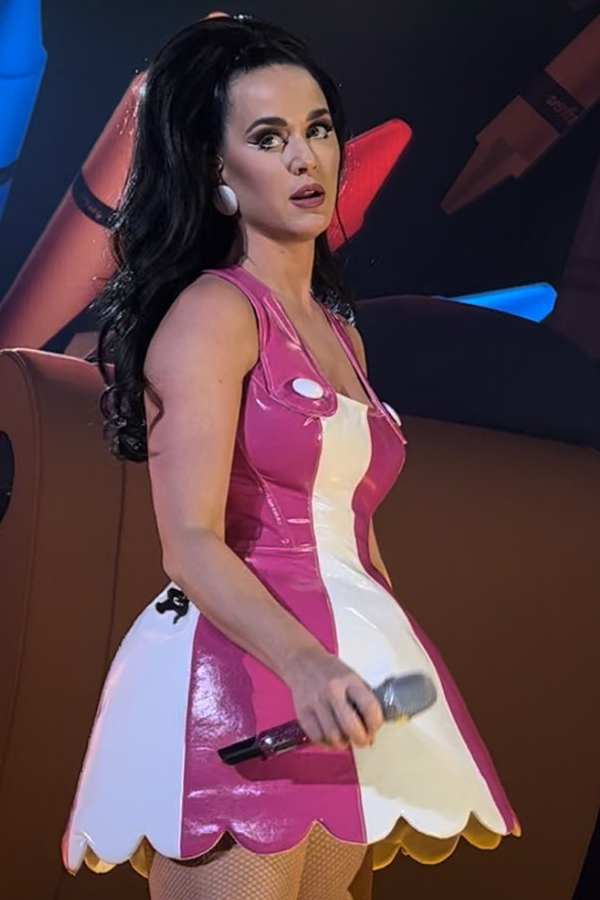
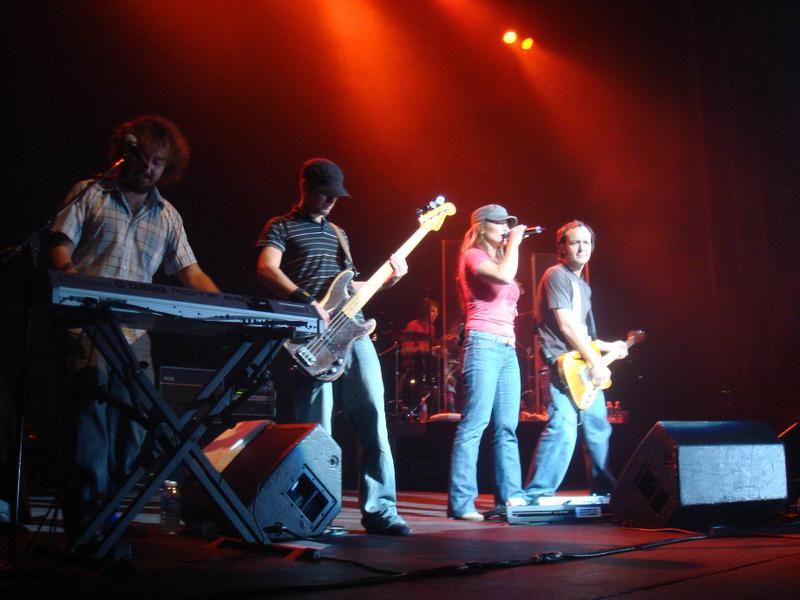
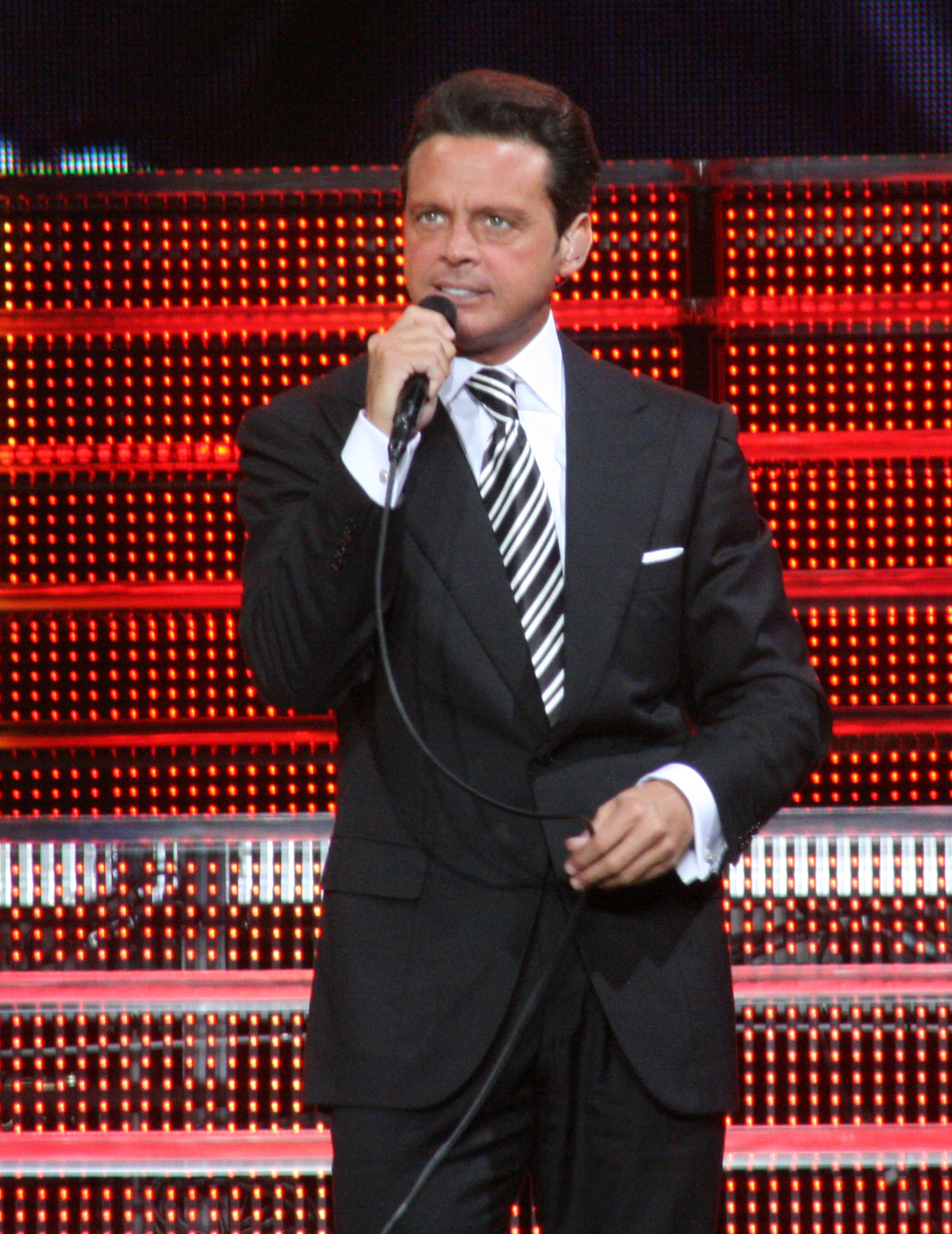
Katy Perry, La Oreja de Van Gogh and Luis Miguel were listed as influences for the album.

The album's opening track, "Lentamente" (Spanish for "slowly"), was described by Ana Mena as her "favorite" of the record. She said that she took months to write the lyrics, but that after one night in which something hurtful happened to her, she was able to finish it in one hour. The song is a "very danceable pop" song with retro and modern sounds in which the singer remembers a passionate night with a younger boy which she can't get off her head; an experience with which she gets obsessed and she wishes she could repeat. For the second track, "Bebé" (Spanish for 'baby'), Mena felt that she needed to apologize to someone so she wrote the song to do it. The track is one of the most urban ones on the record and it features Dejota2021.

"Un Clásico" (Spanish for "a classic") is the first of several Italian-to-Spanish versions on the album. This time, it interpolates "Superclassico" by Ernia. The ballad is about "a relationship that appears by chance but is destined to fail and that, however, is experienced with heavily intensely and without caring about the consequences." The fourth track on the album, "Me He Pillao x Ti" (Spanish for "I've caught feelings for you"), a song in which Mena narrates an autobiographic story. In the first summer of COVID-19 pandemic, her concerts were cancelled so she took some vacations in Italy. There, she met a boy with who she tried to flirt unsuccessfully, learning some time after that she hadn't been successful because he had a girlfriend. One year later, she learned that the relationship had been ended so she decided to write a song about it. The song features Spanish singer Natalia Lacunza.

The fifth track, "Llorando en la Disco" (Spanish for "crying in the club"), is described as a pop song with influences of urban music, latin music and R&B. Mena confirmed that she wrote the song about a boy that left her in a way that she was not expecting, and stated: "What I wanted to express with this song is that I am not a person who is used to going out, but when your friend tell you to go out because you need to clear your head and you are already in the club you think: 'What am I doing here if I what I want is to be in my bed?'". She added: "It's a song that captures the concept of Bellodrama and its dualism: you're crying in a site in which you're having an excellent time, and that world in which you always have to be perfect, elegant, and you have to give your best impression, but the truth is a different one." The album's sixth track, "Ben & Jerry's" is a direct reference to the American ice cream company of the same name. The song was said by Mena to be one of her favorites because it has a "punch of quality" that she was looking for. Inspired in songs by Bruno Mars, it was born in a studio in Milan. "Ben & Jerry's" presents "a sexy sound that contrasts with the rest of the album's tracks." Mena expressed: "For me, it's important that there album counted with different moods and stories with which we can identify ourselves."

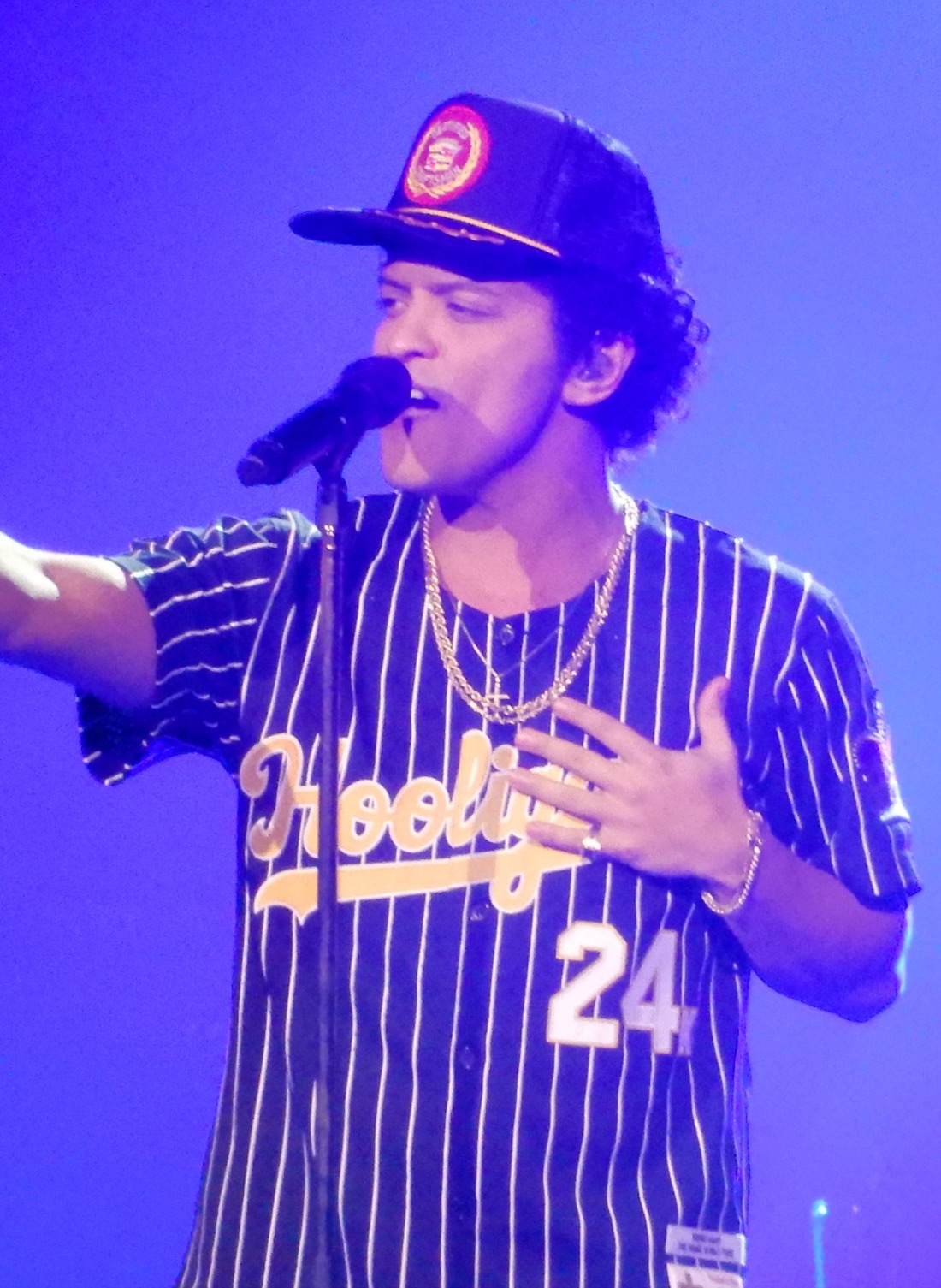
Bruno Mars and Romeo Santos inspired Ana Mena to write "Ben & Jerry's" and "Un Millón de Lunas", respectively.

"Mañana dios dirá" (Spanish for "tomorrow God will say") interpolates "Stasera... che sera!" by Italian band Matia Bazar. The song was recorded and included on the album to capture that sixties and seventies Italian sound that she wanted the album to have. For the album's eighth track, "Un Millón de Lunas" (Spanish for "a million moons"), Mena was inspired by Romeo Santos. The song combines Merengue and bachata. Mena revealed that it the last song that she wrote and that it almost didn't make the track list, but she ultimately decided to include it because "it is not a very urban bachata song as the ones I have been listening to lately." The ninth track, "Me Enamoro" (Spanish for "I fall in love"), has similarities with her smash-hit "A Un Paso de la Luna" because both songs came up around the same time. Mena expressed that she intended to release the song earlier, but that it couldn't be possible because she changed producers amidst the creative process. The album's tenth track is titled "Rojo Amanecer" (Spanish for "red dawn"). In Mena's words, "the song appeared from the feeling that you have when the person that you're in love with leaves you [and] the emptiness that you feel after." The singer revealed that she also sent it to the Sanremo Festival, but that "Duecentomila ore" ended up being chosen as the song to perform. The eleventh track, "Mentirás" (Spanish for "you will lie") features Ir Sais, who Mena discovered thanks to the remix version of "Dream Girl" by Ir Sais and Rauw Alejandro. The song narrates the story of two people who still have a strong attraction to each other despite not being together. It is about being direct and not having excuses to meet each other again.

The Belinda-assisted track "Las 12" (Spanish for "twelve o'clock") is the Spanish version of Mena's very own "Mezzanotte". The pop-EDM song is about the connection between two people. Despite the song's upbeat sound, its lyrics are about a past love which is missed and remembered with spite and the emptiness that is felt after midnight. "Música Ligera" (Spanish for "light music") is the Spanish version of "Musica leggerissima" by the Italians Colapesce and Dimartino. Mena expressed that, even though she was used to having a more contemporary sound, she chose to record the song because she felt it as a tribute to the kind of music which emerged during the 1960s and first created a link between Italy and Spain. The singer also said that her version pays homage to Massiel, Mina and Cecilia, among others, because "they opened the paths we walk nowadays".

The album closes with two bonus tracks: "A Un Paso de la Luna" (Spanish for "one step away from the Moon") with Rocco Hunt and "Se iluminaba" (Spanish for "it got illuminated") with Fred De Palma. Both are upbeat songs that helped Ana Mena catapult her career in Spain and Italy.

== Critical reception ==
Professional ratings
Review scores
Source	Rating
Jenesaispop	3.7/5 stars

The album received positive reviews. Asier Duque of Flooxer wrote that "Bellodrama is a piece that gathers all the aspects that make Ana Mena nowadays a unique and recognizible artist," calling the album "the perfect mix between the music of Spain, Italy and Latin America." In his review for Jenesaispop, Jordi Bardaji gave the album a score of 7.4 out of 10 and said: "Bellodrama is the all the fun and enjoyable we needed; gays, straights and everyone who is open to a well-done commercial pop record." The reviewer praised "Lentamente" and "Me he pillao x ti", labelling them as "fantastic" and "infallible", respectively. However, he wrote that "Un millón de lunas" is not one of the best bachata songs he has heard and that the album is not very "well-rounded". Los 40's Mario Caridad Sánchez wrote that songs like "Música ligera" and "Las 12" have marked the soundtracks of our lifetimes for ever.

== Track listing ==
Bellodrama track listing
No.	Title	Writer(s)	Producer(s)	Length
1.	"Lentamente"	Ana Mena; Bruno Nicolás; David Augustave; José Luis de la Peña; Francesco Catitti; Alex Reige Vella; Cheope; Federica Abbate	Katoo	3:04
2.	"Bebé" (with Dejota2021)	Mena; Nicolás; Augustave; De la Peña; David J. Tovar; Isabella Primera	Dabruk	3:07
3.	"Un clásico"	Mena; Nicolás; Augustave; De la Peña; Alessandro Pulga; Matteo Professione; Stefano Tognini	Zef; Marz	2:53
4.	"Me he pillao x ti" (with Natalia Lacunza)	Mena; Niclás; De la Peña; Carlos Montado Cruz	Dabruk	3:22
5.	"Llorando en la disco"	Mena; Nicolás; Augustave; De la Peña; Andy Clay; Jay Simon; Antonio Barullo; Boby Sierra; Oscar Hernandez	Dabruk; Andy Clay; Jay Simon	3:04
6.	"Ben & Jerry's"	Mena; Nicolás; Augustave; De la Peña; Pulga; Tognini; Davide Petrella	Zef; Marz	3:24
7.	"Mañana Dios dirá"	Mena; Nicolás; Augustave; De la Peña; Tognini; Petrella; Salvatore Stellita; Carlo Marrale; Piero Cassano	Zef; Marz	3:18
8.	"Un millón de lunas"	Mena; Nicolás; Augustave; De la Peña; Luis Maza Chimbo	Dabruk; DJ Glass	3:02
9.	"Me enamoro"	Mena; Nicolás; Augustave; De la Peña; Abbate; Alessandro Merli; Fabio Clemente	Dabruk	2:44
10.	"Rojo amanecer"	Mena; Nicolás; Augustave; De la Peña; Andrea Debernardi; Davide Epicoco; Giulio Nenna; Giuseppe Colonnelli	Giulio Nenna; Andra Debernardi	2:41
11.	"Mentirás" (with Ir Sais)	Mena; Nicolás; Augustave; De la Peña; Tovar; Irgwin Placido Sluis	Dabruk	3:37
12.	"Las 12" (with Belinda)	Mena; Belinda Peregrín; Andrés Torres; Mauricio Rengifo	Andrés Torres; Mauricio Rengifo	2:45
13.	"Música ligera"	Mena; Nicolás; Augustave; De la Peña; Antonio Dimartino; Lorenzo Urciullo	Dabruk; Federico Nardelli; Giordano Colombo
14.	"A un paso de la luna" (with Rocco Hunt)	Mena; Nicolás; Augustave; De la Peña; Abbate; Torres; Rengifo; Clemente; Tognini; Rocco Pagliarulo	Zef	2:50
15.	"Se iluminaba" (with Fred De Palma)	Mena; Nicolás; Augustav; De la Peña; Abbate; Clemente; Merli; Fred De Palma; Gianluca Ciccorelli	Takagi & Ketra	2:54
Total length:				46:41

Notes

- "Un clásico" interpolates "Superclassico" by Ernia.
- "Mañana Dios Dirá" interpolates "Stasera... che sera!" by Matia Bazar.
- "Música ligera" interpolates "Musica leggerissima" by Colapesce and Dimartino.

== Charts ==
=== Weekly charts ===
Weekly chart performance for Bellodrama
Chart (2023)	Peak position
Spanish Albums (Promusicae)	1

=== Year-end charts ===
Year-end chart performance for Bellodrama
Chart (2023)	Position
Spanish Albums (PROMUSICAE)	18

== Certifications ==
Region	Certification	Certified units/sales
Spain (Promusicae)	Platinum	40,000^{‡}
^{‡} Sales+streaming figures based on certification alone.
