= Sensación del Bloque =

2006 single by De la Ghetto and Randy

Single by De la Ghetto and Randy

from the album Reggaeton Rulers: Los Que Ponen, Vol. 1
- Language: Spanish
- English title: "Street Sensation"
- Published: 2006
- Genre: Latin R&B; reggaeton
- Label: La Brea; EMI Televisa
- Songwriters: Rafael Castillo; Randy Ortiz
- Producers: DJ Giann; Dexter; Mista Greenzz

De la Ghetto singles chronology
"Aparentemente" (2006)	"Sensación del Bloque" (2006)	"Es Difícil" (2007)

Music video
- "Sensación del Bloque" on YouTube

"Sensación del Bloque" (English: "Street Sensation") is a song by American singer De la Ghetto and Puerto Rican singer Randy. It was released by La Brea Records and EMI Televisa Music in 2006. The song was produced by DJ Giann, Dexter, and Mista Greenzz.

== Music video ==
The music video of "Sensación del Bloque" was released on February 17, 2007. In addition to the song's performers, the video also features urban artists Daddy Yankee, Tito el Bambino, Ñejo, Julio Voltio, Héctor el Father, Jowell, Cultura Profética, Alexis and Guelo Star. It became one of De la Ghetto's most watched collaborations.

== Critical reception ==
Isabelia Herrera of Pitchfork described "Sensación del Bloque" as "a catchy track that weaves a jilted R&B falsetto with minor piano chords into an archetype of the emo ballads that would later dominate Latin trap". She also commented that "De la Ghetto and Randy did not cut corners and demonstrated their vocal and stylistic versatility without hesitation" and "Many emerging urban artists today owe part of their creative freedom to songs like 'Sensación del Bloque'".

=== Accolades ===
Year-end rankings for "Sensación del Bloque"
Publication	List	Rank	Ref.
Rolling Stone	100 Greatest Reggaeton Songs of All Time	76	

== Charts ==
Weekly chart performance for "Sensación del Bloque"
Chart (2007)	Peak position
US Latin Rhythm Airplay (Billboard)	11
US Tropical Airplay (Billboard)	16

== Other versions ==
On August 26, 2019, Puerto Rican singer Farruko published a cover of the song on En Letra de Otro, soundtrack of the documentary of the same name. On January 19, 2023, Peruvian producer Khalil Alexandeer released a trap version with Peruvian singers Thuglack and Tryhan titled "La Sensación del Block", under the IS2EASY label.
