= Aparentemente =

2006 single by Yaga & Mackie

Single by Yaga & Mackie featuring Arcángel and De la Ghetto

from the album La Reunión
- Language: Spanish; English
- English title: "Apparently"
- Published: 2006
- Genre: Latin R&B; reggaeton
- Label: Iluminados; Jam
- Songwriter(s): Javier Martínez; Luis Pizarro; Álex O. Arocho; Rafaell Castillo; Austin Santos; Wilfredo Moreno
- Producer(s): Tai & Toly

Yaga & Mackie singles chronology
| "Imposible Ignorarte" (2005) | "Aparentemente" (2006) | "El Pistolón" (remix 2) (2009) |

Arcángel singles chronology
| "Ella Quiere" (2006) | "Aparentemente" (2006) | "Para Qué Volver" (2006) |

De la Ghetto singles chronology
| "Ella Quiere" (2006) | "Aparentemente" (2006) | "Sensación del Bloque" (2006) |

Music video
- "Aparentemente" on YouTube

"Aparentemente" is a song by Puerto Rican duo Yaga & Mackie featuring American singers Arcángel and De la Ghetto. The song was released on 2006 as the first single of Yaga & Mackie's fourth studio album La Reunión (2007).

== Accolades ==
Year-end rankings for "Aparentemente"
| Publication | List | Rank | Ref. |
|---|---|---|---|
| Rolling Stone | 100 Greatest Reggaeton Songs of All Time | 81 | |

== Charts ==
=== Weekly charts ===
Weekly chart performance for "Aparentemente"
| Chart (2007) | Peak position |
|---|---|
| US Hot Latin Songs (Billboard) | 42 |
| US Latin Airplay (Billboard) | 42 |
| US Latin Rhythm Airplay (Billboard) | 11 |
| US Tropical Airplay (Billboard) | 24 |

=== Year-end charts ===
2007 year-end chart performance for "Aparentemente"
| Chart (2007) | Position |
|---|---|
| US Latin Rhythm Airplay (Billboard) | 37 |
