= Idols (2026 film) =

2026 sports action drama film

- Theatrical release poster
- Spanish: Ídolos
- Directed by: Mat Whitecross
- Screenplay by: Inma Cánovas; Jordi Gasull; Ricky Roxburgh
- Story by: Jordi Gasull
- Produced by: Marco Belardi; Ricardo Marco Budé; Jordi Gasull; Marc Sabé; Ignacio Salazar-Simpson
- Starring: Óscar Casas; Claudio Santamaria; Ana Mena
- Cinematography: Xavi Giménez
- Edited by: Ascen Marchena
- Music by: Ginevra Nervi
- Production companies: 4 Cats Pictures; Warner Bros. Pictures; Mogambo Productions; Anangu Grup; Imperio Contraataca AIE; Greenboo Production
- Distributed by: Warner Bros. Pictures
- Release date: 23 January 2026 (Spain)
- Running time: 126 minutes
- Countries: Spain; Italy
- Language: Spanish

Idols: The Last Lap (Spanish: Ídolos) is a 2026 sports action drama film directed by Mat Whitecross from a screenplay by Jordi Gasull, Inma Cánovas, and Ricky Roxburgh. It stars Óscar Casas, Claudio Santamaria, and Ana Mena. It is a Spanish-Italian co-production.

== Plot ==
Reckless Moto2 racer Edu Serra is given an opportunity by Aspar Team chief Eli as long as he accepts being coached by his estranged father, former biker Antonio Belardi. Edu also starts a relationship with tattoo artist Luna.

== Cast ==
- Óscar Casas as Edu Serra
- Claudio Santamaria as Antonio Belardi
- Ana Mena as Luna
- Enrique Arce as Eli
- Saul Nanni

== Production ==
The screenplay was written by Inma Cánovas, Jordi Gasull, and Ricky Roxburgh based on an original story by Gasull. Idols is a Spanish-Italian co-production by 4 Cats Pictures, Warner Bros. Entertainment España, Mogambo Productions, Anangu Grup, Imperio Contraataca AIE, Warner Bros. Entertainment Italy, and Greenboo Production, and it had the collaboration of MotoGP.

Shooting locations included the Circuit of the Americas, Misano World Circuit, MotorLand Aragón, Montmeló, Circuito de Jerez, Twin Ring Motegi, and Aspar Circuit. Xavi Giménez worked as cinematographer.

== Release ==
The film is scheduled to be released theatrically in Spain on 23 January 2026 by Warner Bros. Pictures. Warner Bros. also secured Italian theatrical distribution rights. Film Mode acquired international sales rights, non-exclusively in the United Kingdom and the Americas.

== Reception ==
Javier Ocaña of El País assessed that the film has "all the ingredients to draw people to the cinemas".

== See also ==
- List of Spanish films of 2026
