= Superclassico =

2020 single by Ernia

Single by Ernia

from the album Gemelli
- Language: Italian
- Released: 19 June 2020
- Recorded: 2020
- Length: 2:52
- Label: Universal
- Songwriters: Matteo Professione; Alessandro Pulga; Stefano Tognini
- Producers: Marz; Zef

Ernia singles chronology
"Numb" (2019)	"Superclassico" (2020)	"Nuove strade" (2020)

Music video
- "Superclassico" on YouTube

"Superclassico" is a song written and recorded by Italian rapper Ernia. It was released on 19 June 2020 by Island Records as the lead single from his third studio album Gemelli.

The song, produced by Marz and Zef, topped the Italian singles chart and was certified seven-times platinum in Italy.

== Music video ==
The music video for the song was directed by Gianluigi Carella and released on YouTube on 22 June 2020.

== Charts ==
=== Weekly charts ===
Weekly chart performance for "Superclassico"
Chart (2020)	Peak position
Italy (FIMI)	1
San Marino (SMRRTV Top 50)	17

=== Year-end charts ===
Year-end chart performances for "Superclassico"
Chart (2020)	Position
Italy (FIMI)	4
Chart (2021)	Position
Italy (FIMI)	31

== Certifications ==
Certifications for "Superclassico"
Region	Certification	Certified units/sales
Italy (FIMI)	7× Platinum	700,000^{‡}
^{‡} Sales+streaming figures based on certification alone.

== Ana Mena version ==
"Un clásico"

Single by Ana Mena

from the album Bellodrama
- Language: Spanish
- Released: 20 January 2023
- Length: 2:53
- Label: Sony
- Songwriters: Ernia; Ana Mena; José Luis de la Peña Mira; Bruno Nicolas Fernandez; David Augustave; Marz; Zef
- Producers: Marz; Zef

Ana Mena singles chronology
"Ave de paso" (2022)	"Un clásico" (2023)	"Me he pillao x ti" (2023)

Music video
- "Un clásico" on YouTube

Spanish singer Ana Mena recorded a Spanish-language version of the song, titled "Un clásico", with lyrics adapted by Ana Mena herself, José Luis de la Peña Mira, Bruno Nicolas Fernandez and David Augustave.

A music video for the song, directed by Willy Rodriguez, was released on 20 January 2023.

=== Charts ===
Weekly chart performance for "Un clásico"
Chart (2023)	Peak position
Spain (Promusicae)	53

=== Certifications ===
Certifications for "Un clásico"
Region	Certification	Certified units/sales
Spain (Promusicae)	Platinum	60,000^{‡}
^{‡} Sales+streaming figures based on certification alone.
