= Musica leggerissima =

2021 single by Colapesce and Dimartino

- Vinyl cover

Single by Colapesce and Dimartino

from the album I mortali²
- Language: Italian
- Released: 3 March 2021
- Recorded: 2020
- Studio: Auditoria Records Studio, Fino Mornasco
- Genre: Indie pop
- Length: 4:00
- Label: 42 Records; Numero Uno
- Songwriter(s): Antonio Dimartino; Lorenzo Urciullo
- Producer(s): Federico Nardelli; Giordano Colombo

Colapesce singles chronology
| "Cocoricò" (2020) | "Musica leggerissima" (2021) | "Toy Boy" (2021) |

Dimartino singles chronology
| "Noia mortale" (2020) | "Musica leggerissima" (2021) | "Toy Boy" (2021) |

Music video
- "Musica leggerissima" on YouTube

"Musica leggerissima" ("Very light music") is a song written and recorded by Italian singer-songwriters Colapesce and Dimartino. Produced by Federico Nardelli and Giordano Colombo, the song was released as a single and included in I mortali², the 2021 re-release of the duo's album I mortali, originally released in 2020. The song competed in the Sanremo Music Festival 2021, placing 4th in a field of 26. It also received the "Lucio Dalla" Press, Radio, TV, & Web Award.

== Background ==
The song was written by Colapesce and Dimartino immediately after the release of their collaborative album I mortali, in June 2020. Its composition took a long time, since they struggled with finding the words to create a song full of meaning, but still light and simple.

In September 2020, they entered the studio and recorded the first demo of the song, working with producers Federico Nardelli and Giordano Colombo. After the song was chosen as one of the Sanremo Music Festival 2021 entries, they re-worked it with Adele Nigro, who recorded the song's background vocals, and violinist Davide Rossi. Following suggestions by the contest's artistic director Amadeus, the song's structure was also changed, removing an instrumental section.

== Music video ==
The music video for the song was directed by Salvo "Zavvo" Nicolosi.

== Charts ==
=== Weekly charts ===
Weekly chart performance for "Musica leggerissima"
| Chart (2021) | Peak position |
|---|---|
| Croatia (HRT) | 88 |
| Global Excl. U.S. (Billboard) | 87 |
| Italy (FIMI) | 1 |
| Italy Airplay (EarOne) | 1 |
| San Marino (SMRRTV Top 50) | 2 |
| Switzerland (Schweizer Hitparade) | 35 |

=== Year-end charts ===
Year-end chart performance for "Musica leggerissima"
| Chart (2021) | Position |
|---|---|
| Italy (FIMI) | 7 |

== Certifications ==
Certifications for "Musica leggerissima"
| Region | Certification | Certified units/sales |
|---|---|---|
| Italy (FIMI) | 5× Platinum | 350,000^{‡} |
^{‡} Sales+streaming figures based on certification alone.

== Ana Mena version ==
"Música ligera"

Single by Ana Mena

from the album Bellodrama
- Language: Spanish
- Released: 26 November 2021
- Genre: Pop
- Length: 3:55
- Label: Sony
- Songwriter(s): Ana Mena; Antonio Di Martino; Bruno Nicolás; David Augustave; José Luís de la Peña Mira; Lorenzo Urciullo
- Producer(s): Dabruk; Federico Nardelli; Giordano Colombo

Ana Mena singles chronology
| "Me quedo" (2021) | "Música ligera" (2021) | "Duecentomila ore" (2022) |

Spanish singer Ana Mena recorded a Spanish-language version of the song, titled "Música ligera", with lyrics adapted by Ana Mena herself, José Luis de la Peña Mira, Bruno Nicolas and David Augustave. The song was produced by Dabruk, Federico Nardelli and Giordano Colombo, and it was released as a digital single on 25 November 2021 under Epic Records and Sony Music. On the following day, it was also released for airplay to radio stations in Italy and Spain.

A music video for the song was released on 26 November 2021. It was directed by Willy Rodriguez and produced by The Panda Bear Show. The video is a tribute to female icons of the 1960s and 1970s. According to Ana Mena, she chose to record the song despite being used to a different sound, closer to contemporary influences, as she felt it as a tribute to the kind of music which emerged during the 1960s and first created a link between Italy and Spain. Mena said: "It is an applause to Massiel, Mina, Cecilia etc. They opened the paths we walk now."

=== Charts ===
Weekly chart performance for "Música ligera"
| Chart (2021–2022) | Peak position |
|---|---|
| Spain (PROMUSICAE) | 11 |
| Spain Airplay (PROMUSICAE) | 1 |

=== Certifications ===
Certifications for "Música ligera"
| Region | Certification | Certified units/sales |
|---|---|---|
| Spain (PROMUSICAE) | 3× Platinum | 180,000^{‡} |
^{‡} Sales+streaming figures based on certification alone.
