= Ana Mena =

Spanish singer-songwriter and actress (born 1997)

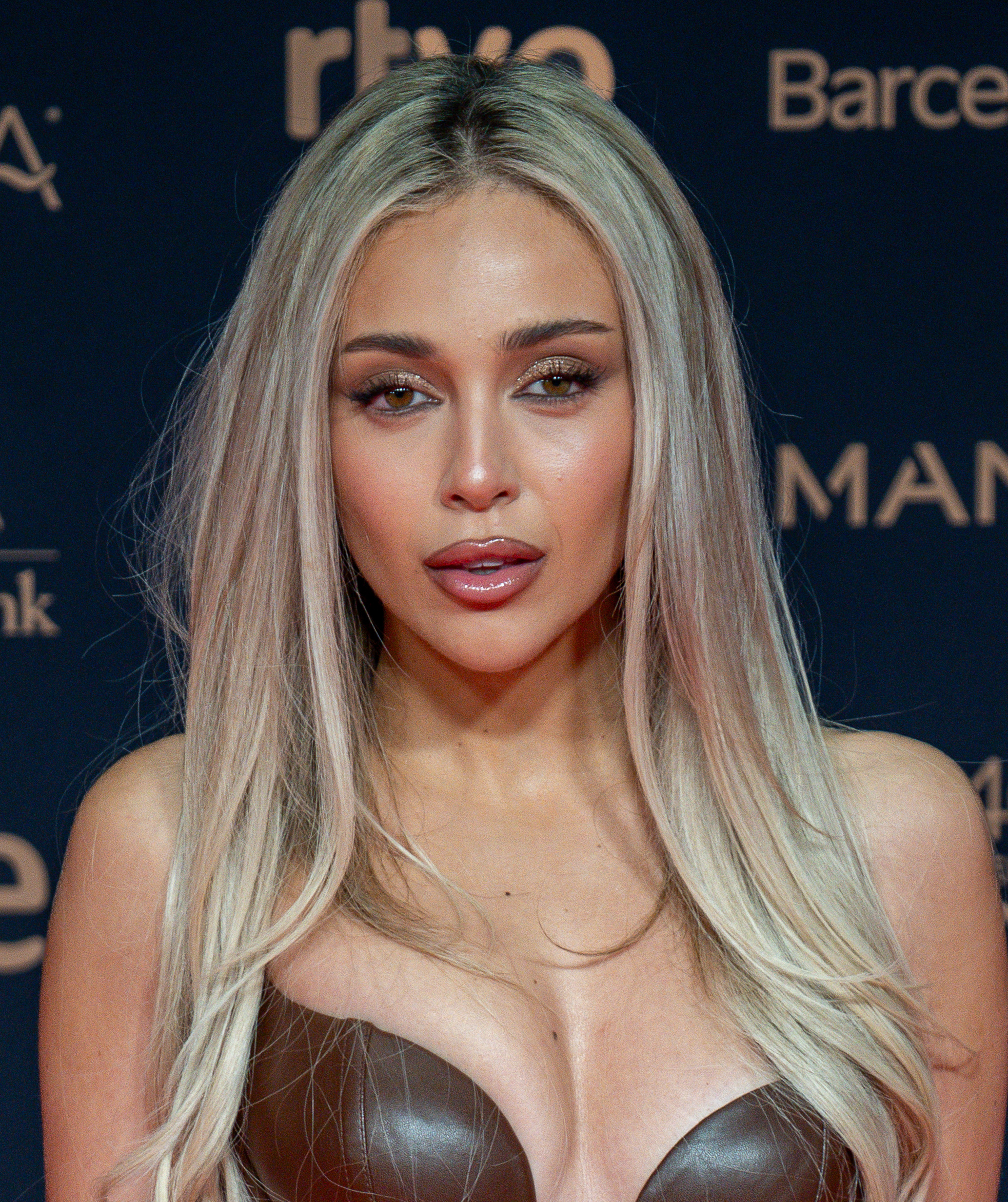
- Ana Mena at the 2026 Goya Awards
- Born: Ana Mena Rojas; 25 February 1997 (age 29); Estepona, Andalusia, Spain
- Occupations: Singer; songwriter; actress
- Years active: 2006–present
- Musical career
- Genres: Pop; dance pop
- Works: Discography
- Label: Sony Spain
- Website: Official website

Ana Mena Rojas (born 25 February 1997) is a Spanish singer-songwriter and actress. Starting her career on Spanish television series, she reached popularity in Europe and Latin America as a singer winning four LOS40 Music Awards, a Premios Odeón and a Heat Latin Music Awards.

Mena has achieved success in Spain, Italy, France, and Latin American countries thanks to successful collaborations and singles, including "Una volta ancora", "A un paso de la luna" and "Un bacio all'improvviso". Since 2017, Mena has published two studio albums, promoted by several singles, including "Duecentomila ore" which competed during the Sanremo Music Festival 2022.

Mena also starred on Spanish televisions series and films, including Vive cantando (2013–2014), Welcome to Eden (2022), Idols (2026) and Rage (2026), and Spanish television programs, including as judge on La Voz Kids (2026).

== Life and career ==
Born in 1997 in the Spanish town of Estepona, Málaga , to an Argentine mother, Natalia Niznik, and a Spanish father, Antonio Mena, Mena developed an interest in music at a young age thanks to her parents’ influence, along with her younger brother José Carlos. From 2006 to 2010, she appeared on the Canal Sur television show Menuda noche. In 2007, after winning the Veo Veo Awards, she released her first song, "Esta es mi ilusión". She subsequently began pursuing acting as Pepi in 2009 thanks to the television film Marisol, la película*. In 2010 Mena was cast on Disney's musical reality show My Camp Rock 2, ending up as the winner.

Her musical career began in 2016, when she released her debut single "No soy como tú crees". Mena has also collaborated with many international artists. In 2018, she gained popularity in Italy with the song "D'estate non vale" with Fred De Palma. The unexpected Italian success was a game changer in her career. Since then, she managed to deliver several hit songs both in Italy and Spain, becoming one of the most listened Spanish artists of the streaming era and taking part in the Sanremo Music Festival 2022 with "Duecentomila ore". She has also covered Italian pop songs by other artists, such as "Música ligera" ("Musica leggerissima" by Colapesce and Dimartino) and "Un clásico" ("Superclassico" by Ernia).

Mena released her debut album, Índex, on 11 May 2018, and her second studio album, Bellodrama, on 24 March 2023. Hugely popular in her native Spain, Ana Mena has also gained a significant fanbase in France, Italy, Switzerland, Mexico, Argentina and Chile.

== Filmography ==
=== Television ===
| Year | Title | Role(s) | Notes |
|---|---|---|---|
| 2009 | Marisol, la pelicula | Pepi | Television film |
| 2010 | My Camp Rock | Herself / Contestant | Winner (season 2) |
| 2010 | Supercharly | Veronica Navarro | Main role |
| 2011 | Como alas al viento | Gloria Mohedano | Television film |
| 2013–2014 | Vive cantando | Paola Ruiz Almagro | Main role |
| 2013–2020 | Tu cara me suena | Herself / Performer | 3 episodes |
| 2020 | Sanremo Music Festival 2020 | Herself / Guest | Annual music festival |
| 2022 | Sanremo Music Festival 2022 | Herself / Contestant | Annual music festival |
| 2022 | Welcome to Eden | Judith | Recurring role |
| 2022 | Idol Kids | Herself / Judge | Talent show |
| 2023 | The Resistance | Herself / Guest | Episode dated March 30, 2023 |
| 2026 | La Voz Kids | Herself / Coach | Talent show; Season 11 |
| 2026 | Rage | Carla | Recurring role |

=== Films ===
| Year | Title | Role(s) | Notes |
|---|---|---|---|
| 2011 | The Skin I Live In | Young Norma Ledgard | |
| 2018 | Journey to a Mother's Room | Bea | |
| 2026 | Idols | Luna | Main role |

== Discography ==
- Índex (2018)
- Bellodrama (2023)

== Awards and nominations ==
| Organization | Year | Category | Nominee/work | Result | Ref. |
|---|---|---|---|---|---|
| Heat Latin Music Awards | 2024 | Best Pop Artist | Herself | Won | |
| Heat Latin Music Awards | 2026 | Best Female Artist | Herself | Nominated | |
| Heat Latin Music Awards | 2026 | Best Collaboration | "Pa ti toa" (with Lola Índigo) | Nominated | |
| LOS40 Music Awards | 2016 | New Artist of the Year | Herself | Nominated | |
| LOS40 Music Awards | 2020 | Del 40 al 1 Artist Award | Herself | Nominated | |
| LOS40 Music Awards | 2021 | Best Act | Herself | Nominated | |
| LOS40 Music Awards | 2021 | Del 40 al 1 Artist Award | Herself | Won | |
| LOS40 Music Awards | 2021 | "A un paso de la luna" (with Rocco Hunt) | Best Song | Nominated | |
| LOS40 Music Awards | 2022 | Best Act | Herself | Nominated | |
| LOS40 Music Awards | 2022 | Best Song | "Música ligera" | Won | |
| LOS40 Music Awards | 2022 | "Quiero decirte" (with Belinda) | Best Collaboration | Nominated | |
| LOS40 Music Awards | 2022 | "Las 12" (with Abraham Mateo) | Best Video | Nominated | |
| LOS40 Music Awards | 2023 | Best Act | Herself | Won | |
| LOS40 Music Awards | 2023 | Best Live Act | Herself | Nominated | |
| LOS40 Music Awards | 2023 | Best Album | Bellodrama | Nominated | |
| LOS40 Music Awards | 2023 | Bellodrama Tour | Best Tour, Festival or Concert | Nominated | |
| LOS40 Music Awards | 2024 | Best Act | Herself | Nominated | |
| LOS40 Music Awards | 2024 | Best Live Act | Herself | Nominated | |
| LOS40 Music Awards | 2024 | Best Song | "Madrid City" | Won | |
| LOS40 Music Awards | 2024 | Best Collaboration | "Carita Triste" (with Emilia Mernes) | Nominated | |
| LOS40 Music Awards | 2025 | Best Tour or Concert | El Gran Bellodrama | Nominated | |
| LOS40 Music Awards | 2026 | Best Act | Herself | Nominated | |
| LOS40 Music Awards | 2026 | Best Live Act | Herself | Nominated | |
| LOS40 Music Awards | 2026 | Best Song | "Pa ti toa" (with Lola Índigo) | Nominated | |
| LOS40 Music Awards | 2026 | Best Collaboration | "Pa ti toa" (with Lola Índigo) | Won | |
| MTV Europe Music Awards | 2021 | Best Spanish Act | Herself | Nominated | |
| MTV Europe Music Awards | 2024 | Best Spanish Act | Herself | Nominated | |
| Premios de la Academia de Música | 2024 | Song of the Year | "Madrid City" | Nominated | |
| Premios de la Academia de Música | 2024 | Best Pop Album | Bellodrama | Won | |
| Premios de la Academia de Música | 2025 | Best Tour | Bellodrama Tour | Nominated | |
| Premios Dial | 2022 | Artist Award | Herself | Won | |
| Premios Dial | 2023 | Artist Award | Herself | Won | |
| Premio Lo Nuestro | 2025 | Best Pop-Urban Eurosong | "Madrid City" | Nominated | |
| Premio Lo Nuestro | 2026 | Best Pop-Urban Eurosong | "Quiero Decirte" (with Abraham Mateo) | Nominated | |
