= Masacre Musical =

Studio album by De la Ghetto
- Released: October 14, 2008
- Recorded: 2007–2009
- Genre: Hip hop, pop, R&B, reggaeton, Latin trap
- Label: Fight Klub Nation, Premium Latin, Sony Latin
- Producer: Rafael Castillo, Lenny Santos, Nely el Arma Secreta, Tainy, Randy Ortiz, Alex Kyza, DJ Blass, DJ Giann, Play-N-Skillz Coach

Singles from Masacre Musical
- 1. "Es Difícil" Released: November 30, 2007; 2. "Tú Te Imaginas" Released: 2008; 3. "Lover" Released: 2009; 4. "Momento Que Te Vi" Released: 2009; 5. "Gangsta" Released: 2009; 6. "Se Te Nota" Released: 2009

Masacre Musical (English: Musical Massacre) is the debut studio album by American singer De la Ghetto, released on October 14, 2008 by Sony BMG Norte. The album features Mavado, Randy, Guelo Star and Teddy Riley.

== Track listing ==
1. "Gangsta" (G. Arias, V. Felix, A. Ferreira, R. Castillo) — 6:45
2. "Tú Te Imaginas" (A. Ferreira, J. Walker, R. Castillo) — 2:34
3. "No Me Digas Que No" (G. Arias, M. De Jesús, M. Maldonado, D. Torres, R. Castillo) — 3:01
4. "Momento Que Te Vi" (V. Felix, A. Ferreira, R. Castillo, M. De Jesús) — 4:21
5. "Lover" (J. Reyes, J. Salinas, O. Salinas) — 3:15
6. "Come Out and See" (featuring Mavado) (N. Deane, T. Thompson, G. Blair, D. Brooks, R. Castillo) — 3:51
7. "Se Te Nota" (G. Arias, A. Ferreira, V. Felix, R. Castillo) — 4:06
8. "Shake That Thing" (A. Ferreira, J. Walker, R. Castillo) — 3:37
9. "Es Difícil" (G. Arias, V. Felix, R. Castillo) — 4:40
10. "Booty" (featuring Randy) (G. Arias, M. Maldonado, W. Sabat, D. Torres, R. Castillo, R. Ortiz) — 4:15
11. "Así Es" (featuring Guelo Star) (V. Felix, R. Castillo, M. de Jesús) — 3:57
12. "Amor en la Jipeta" (J. Mteo, R. Castillo, L. Santos) — 3:33
13. "Perdición" (V. Felix, R. Castillo, M. De Jesús) — 4:39
14. "Serial Lover" (featuring Teddy Riley) (R. Jackson, T. Riley) — 3:40
15. "Como el Viento" (A. Ferreira, R. Castillo, M. De Jesús) — 3:21
16. "Chica Mala" (J. "Nely" De la Cruz, A. Ferreira, M. Masis, R. Castillo) — 3:54
17. "Solo y Vacío" (G. Arias, A. R. Crespo, A. Ferreira, V. Felix, R. Castillo) — 4:59

== Chart performance ==
Chart (2008)	Peak position
U.S. Billboard Top Latin Albums	46
U.S. Billboard Latin Rhythm Albums	8

== Credits ==
- Jason Fleming - Engineering
- Daniel Hastings - Graphic Design, Art Direction, Photography, Creative Director
- Randy "Randy" Ortiz - Co-executive Producer
- Lenny Santos - Co-executive Producer
- Miguel Antonio "Guelo Star" de Jesús - Co-Songwriter, Composer
