= A un passo dalla luna =

2020 single by Rocco Hunt and Ana Mena

Single by Rocco Hunt × Ana Mena
- Language: Italian
- Released: 3 July 2020
- Recorded: 2020
- Genre: Reggaeton; Latin pop
- Length: 2:47
- Label: RCA; Sony
- Composers: Federica Abbate; Stefano Tognini
- Lyricists: Rocco Pagliarulo; Federica Abbate; Fabio Clemente
- Producer: Zef

Music video
- "A un passo dalla luna" on YouTube

"A un paso de la luna"

Single by Ana Mena × Rocco Hunt
- Language: Spanish
- Released: 14 August 2020
- Recorded: 2020
- Genre: Reggaeton; Latin pop
- Length: 2:47
- Label: RCA
- Composers: Federica Abbate; Stefano Tognini
- Lyricists: Rocco Pagliarulo; Ana Mena Rojas; Federica Abbate; Fabio Clemente; Bruno Nicolás Fernández; David Augustave Picanes; Jose Luis De La Peña Mira

Music video
- "A un passo de la luna" on YouTube

"A un paso de la luna (Remix)"

Single by Reik & Rocco Hunt × Ana Mena
- Language: Spanish
- Released: 23 March 2021
- Recorded: 2020/2021
- Genre: Reggaeton; Latin pop
- Length: 3:13
- Label: Sony; Columbia
- Composers: Federica Abbate; Stefano Tognini
- Lyricists: Rocco Pagliarulo; Ana Mena Rojas; Federica Abbate; Bruno Nicolás Fernández; David Augustave Picanes; Jose Luis De La Peña Mira; Mauricio Rengifo; Andrés Torres; Jesús Navarro; Julio Ramírez; Bibi Marín
- Producers: Mauricio Rengifo; Andrés Torres

Music video
- "A un passo de la luna (Remix)" on YouTube

"A un passo dalla luna" ("One step away from the moon") is a 2020 Italian-language single of Italian rapper Rocco Hunt and Spanish singer Ana Mena released on 3 July 2020 on RCA and Sony. The song spent 9 weeks at the top of the Italian Singles Chart, being certified six platinum by FIMI. A Spanish-language version "A un paso de la luna" was launched in Spain and Spanish-speaking countries on August 14, 2020, peaking at number four on the Spanish Singles Chart and being certified six platinum in the country. On March 23, 2021 an official remix version of the song with Mexican music group Reik for Mexico and Latin America radios, which peaked at numer eleven on France Singles Chart and being certified platinum by SNEP.

== Composition ==
Lyrics for the song are by Rocco Pagliarulo, Federica Abbate and Fabio Clemente, and music by Federica Abbate and Stefano Tognini. The singer explained the meaning of the song and his decision to collaborate with Spanish singer Ana Mena:

"Ana Mena and I had been writing to each other for years, and finally this year we found the right moment to make this song together. [...] It is about the summer we finally rediscovered, about the freedom we had after the lockdown ended. The song is about a girl who finally dances freely outside a club, a return to all the things that may have been forbidden in recent months. It's a song that brings together beautiful worlds: the rhythm of bachata with its distinctly Caribbean flavour, mixed with Italian song and Neapolitan melody. It's a Mediterranean song that unites Italy and Spain, when it nods to the Latin world in a new and modern way that will get everyone dancing and having fun! We met with Ana to make this song and we hit it off right away."

== Versions ==
=== A un paso de la luna ===
In the same year of the release of the Italian single, a Spanish-language version was released with the title "A un paso de la luna" for the Hispanic markets. It reached number 4 on the Spanish Singles Chart. Additional lyrics for the Spanish version included Andrés Torres, Jesús Navarro, Julio Ramírez and Bibi Marín.

=== Remix ===
In 2021, a remix of the song was released with Reik in addition to Rocco Hunt and Ana Mena. The version released by Sony Music Entertainment and Columbia Records charted in France.

== Music video ==
The music video was directed by Astronauts and was filmed in Ibiza, and released on 16 July 2020 on Rocco Hunt's official YouTube channel.

== Awards ==
The song, in its Spanish version, earned the award for "Best Video Clip" at the Premios Odeón 2021.

== Charts ==
=== Weekly charts ===
Chart (2020–2021)	Peak position
Italy (FIMI)	1
Spain (PROMUSICAE)	4
San Marino (SMRRTV Top 50)	45
Switzerland (Schweizer Hitparade)	31

Remix

Chart (2020–21)	Peak position
France (SNEP)	11

=== Year-end charts ===
Chart (2020)	Position
Spain (PROMUSICAE)	44

Chart (2021)	Position
France (SNEP)	33

== Certifications ==
Certifications for "A un passo dalla luna"
Region	Certification	Certified units/sales
France (SNEP) Remix	Platinum	200,000^{‡}
Italy (FIMI)	6× Platinum	420,000^{‡}
Mexico (AMPROFON)	Gold	30,000^{‡}
Spain (Promusicae)	6× Platinum	240,000^{‡}
Spain (Promusicae) Remix	Gold	30,000^{‡}
^{‡} Sales+streaming figures based on certification alone.

== Release history ==
"A un passo dalla luna" release history
Region	Date	Version	Format	Label	Ref.
Italy	July 3, 2020	Original	Radio airplay	Sony	
Various	August 14, 2020	Spanish version	Digital download; streaming	Sony	
Spain	August 14, 2020	Spanish version	Radio airplay	Sony	
Various	March 23, 2021	Remix version	Digital download; streaming	Sony	
Mexico	March 23, 2021	Remix version	Radio airplay	Sony	
