= Mara Sattei discography =

Discography of Italian singer-songwriter Mara Sattei

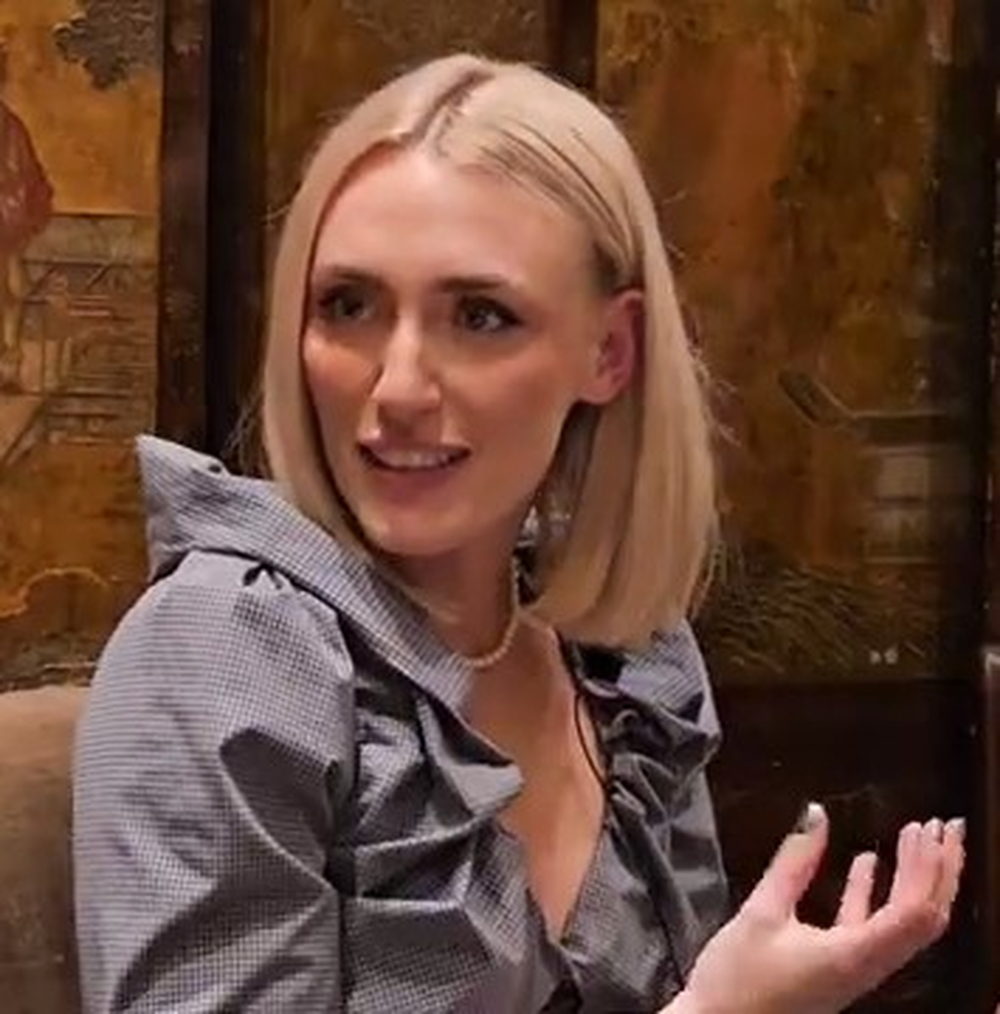
- Mara Sattei in February 2026
- Studio albums: 3
- EPs: 1
- Mixtapes: 1
- Singles: 27

The discography of Italian singer-songwriter Mara Sattei consists of three studio albums, one mixtape, one EP and twenty-seven singles.

== Studio albums ==
List of studio albums with album details
Title	Album details	Peak chart positions		Certifications
Title	Album details	ITA	SWI	Certifications
Universo	Released: 14 January 2022; Label: Arista, Columbia; Formats: CD, LP, digital download, streaming	7	—	
Casa Gospel (with Thasup)	Released: 13 December 2024; Label: Epic; Formats: CD, LP, digital download, streaming	2	85	FIMI: Gold
Che me ne faccio del tempo	Released: 13 February 2026; Label: Epic; Formats: CD, 2 LP, digital download, streaming	19	—	
"—" denotes album that did not chart or were not released.

== Mixtapes ==
List of mixtapes with details
Title	Mixtape details
Frammenti: Street Covers N.2 (Note: Credited as Sara Mattei.)	Released: 21 January 2015; Etichetta: Studio8, Homies Label; Formats: CD, digital download, streaming

== Extended plays ==
List of EPs with details
Title	EP details
Frammenti (Acoustic Covers EP N.1)	Released: 8 July 2014; Label: Studio8, Homies Label; Formats: CD, digital download, streaming

== Singles ==
=== As lead artist ===
List of singles as lead artist, with selected chart positions, showing year released and album name
Title	Year	Peak chart positions			Certifications	Album
Title	Year	ITA	SMR	SWI	Certifications	Album
"Sola con te"	2015	—	—	—		Frammenti: Street Covers N.2
"Non basterà"	2016	—	—	—		Non-album singles
"Mama Oh"	2017	—	—	—		Non-album singles
"Nuova registrazione 326"	2019	—	—	—	FIMI: Gold	Non-album singles
"Nuova registrazione 402"	2019	—	—	—		Non-album singles
"Nuova registrazione 527"	2020	59	—	—		Non-album singles
"Scusa"	2021	47	21	—		Universo
"Tuttecose" (Gazzelle featuring Mara Sattei)	2021	16	—	—	FIMI: 2× Platinum	OK un c***o
"Ciò che non dici"	2021	—	—	—		Universo
"Parentesi" (featuring Giorgia)	2022	56	—	—	FIMI: Gold	Universo
"La dolce vita" (with Fedez and Tananai)		1	2	44	FIMI: 6× Platinum; IFPI SWI: Gold	Disumano
"Duemilaminuti"	2023	10	20	—	FIMI: 2× Platinum	Non-album singles
"Tasche"	2023	—	—	—		Non-album singles
"Piango in discoteca"	2023	94	38	—	FIMI: Gold	Non-album singles
"Mare aperto"	2023	89	—	—		Non-album singles
"Tempo (all the things she said)"	2024	—	—	—		Non-album singles
"Solo guai"	2024	—	—	—		Non-album singles
"Posto mio" (with Thasup)	2024	33	—	—		Casa Gospel
"Giorni tristi"	2025	—	—	—		Che me ne faccio del tempo
"Sopra di me"	2025	—	—	—		Che me ne faccio del tempo
"Le cose che non sai di me"	2026	28	—	—		Che me ne faccio del tempo
"—" denotes singles that did not chart or were not released.

=== As featured artist ===
List of singles, with chart positions, album name and certifications
Title	Year	Peak chart positions		Certifications	Album
Title	Year	ITA	SMR	Certifications	Album
"Poli opposti" (Surfa feat. Sara Mattei)	2014	—	—		Non-album single
"Dilemme (Remix)" (Lous and the Yakuza featuring Tha Supreme and Mara Sattei)	2020	3	—	FIMI: Platinum	Gore
"Spigoli" (Carl Brave featuring Mara Sattei and Tha Supreme)	2020	1	—	FIMI: 3× Platinum	Coraggio
"Altalene" (Slait and Tha Supreme featuring Mara Sattei and Coez)	2020	1	37	FIMI: 3× Platinum	Bloody Vinyl 3
"Vuoto dentro" (Sick Luke featuring Bresh and Mara Sattei)	2022	42	—	FIMI: Gold	X2
"Il mio nome" (Remix) (Ernia featuring Mara Sattei)	2023	51	28	FIMI: Gold	Io non ho paura
"—" denotes singles that did not chart or were not released.

== Other charted songs ==
List of other charted songs, with selected chart positions, showing year released and album name
Title	Year	Peak chart positions	Album
Title	Year	ITA	Album
"Blu intenso" (featuring Tedua)	2022	80	Universo
"Egli è il Re" (with Thasup)	2024	50	Casa Gospel
"Bless su Bless" (with Thasup)	2024	55	Casa Gospel
"Back to Back" (with Thasup)	2024	82	Casa Gospel
"Come polvere" (with Thasup)	2024	90	Casa Gospel
"So che ci sei" (with Thasup)	2024	61	Casa Gospel
"One King" (with Thasup)	2024	64	Casa Gospel

== Guest appearances ==
List of non-single appearances on compilation albums or other artists' albums, with album name
Title	Year	Peak chart positions	Certifications	Album
Title	Year	ITA	Certifications	Album
"L'ancora e il timone" (Angelo Maugeri featuring Sara Mattei)	2016	—		Duets Collection
"M12ano" (Tha Supreme featuring Mara Sattei)	2019	6	FIMI: Platinum	23 6451
"L%p" (Tha Supreme featuring Mara Sattei)	2021	10	FIMI: Gold	Carattere speciale
"Roma è sempre la stessa" (Carl Brave featuring Mara Sattei)	2023	—		Migrazione
"Tutto o niente" (Mecna featuring Mara Sattei)	2025	—		Discordia, armonia e altri stati d'animo
"—" denotes singles that did not chart or were not released.

== Writing credits ==
List of selected songs co-written by Mara Sattei
Title	Year	Artist	Album
"Panico nel business"	2020	Los Makasuples	Non-album singles
"Cornici bianche"	2020	Mydrama	Non-album singles
"Vittoria"	2020	Casadilego	Non-album singles
"Oceano di cose perse"	2022	Casadilego	Non-album singles
"Niente di male"	2024	Giorgia	G
