= Che me ne faccio del tempo =

Studio album by Mara Sattei
- Released: 13 February 2026
- Genre: Pop
- Length: 45:38
- Label: Epic
- Producers: Mara Sattei; Bias; Cripo; Dona; Enrico Brun; Loryy; Lvnar; Thasup

Mara Sattei chronology
Casa Gospel (2024)	Che me ne faccio del tempo (2026)

Singles from Che me ne faccio del tempo
- 1. "Giorni tristi" Released: 12 September 2025; 2. "Sopra di me" Released: 21 November 2025; 3. "Le cose che non sai di me" Released: 25 February 2026; 4. "L'ultimo bacio" Released: 27 February 2026; 5. "Sabato Sera" Released: 29 May 2026

Che me ne faccio del tempo (transl. What do I do with time?) is the third studio album by Italian singer-songwriter Mara Sattei, released on 13 February 2026 by Epic.

The album contains the song "Le cose che non sai di me", with which the singer-songwriter competed at the 76th Sanremo Music Festival, ranking twenty-ninth at the end of the event.

== Description ==
On 12 January 2026 it was announced that the album would be released digitally on February 13 and physically on 27 February, containing three additional tracks.

The album consists of fourteen tracks for the digital edition plus three for the physical edition written by the singer-songwriter herself with the collaboration of writers and producers, including Bias, Cripo, Dona, Enrico Brun, Loryy, Lvnar, and Thasup. Regarding the project, the singer-songwriter stated:

I am all the facets I tell. Universo was a very varied album, in which I played with my voice a lot, as if it were an instrument, and I explored the worlds surrounding Mara Sattei. On this album, however, I felt the need to stop, take my time, and use my writing as a common thread. I wanted the words to be central, to reach others. It's also a bit of a rebirth, because I see myself differently, I see myself having grown over the years. I'm no longer afraid of being seen as fragile, nor of expressing my emotions, and I think I've expressed that in the album.

The album features four collaborations with Elisa, Mecna, Noemi and Thasup. Regarding her choice of collaborato ns and the approach with the authors of the songs, in particular Madame and Ultimo, the singer-songwriter stated:

There are so many artists I've never collaborated with, like Noemi, whom I've known for many years but with whom we'd never actually released anything new. Yet when I wrote "Grande amore", I immediately thought of her. The same thing happened with Elisa: I wrote the chorus and wanted to try, contact her. For me, it was a dream because I grew up with her music. Within a week, she sent me the verse of the song, which she loved. Mecna and I met in the studio, as well as my brother and Madame, who for me is one of the most beautiful writers in Italy. Speaking of the collaboration with Ultimo, I wrote "Te ne vai" and sent it to him, since he liked it. We then started writing together, and when we finished it together, a truly beautiful exchange developed. Everyone on this album truly added something personal, they made a human and artistic contribution.

The digital version of the album also includes as an exclusive track the cover "L'ultimo bacio" by Carmen Consoli, performed with Mecna on the fourth evening dedicated to the covers of the 76th Sanremo Music Festival.

== Track listing ==
Che me ne faccio del tempo – Standard track listing
No.	Title	Lyrics	Music	Producer(s)	Length
1.	"Tic tac" (intro)	Sara Mattei	S. Mattei; Alessandro Donadei; Enrico Brun	Dona; Brun	1:20
2.	"Le cose che non sai di me"	S. Mattei	S. Mattei; Brun; Donadei; Davide Mattei	Brun; Dona; Thasup	3:24
3.	"Sopra di me"	S. Mattei; Francesca Calearo	Marco Spaggiari; Rocco Giovannoni	Bias; Brun; Dona	3:21
4.	"E chissà se ricordo"	S. Mattei	Bias; Brun; Donadei	Brun; Dona	2:55
5.	"Mezzocuore"	S. Mattei	D. Mattei	Thasup	2:16
6.	"Ora lo so"	S. Mattei	Donadei	Brun; Dona	2:59
7.	"Gran rumore" (featuring Noemi)	S. Mattei; Veronica Scopelliti	Brun; Nicola Lazzarin; Donadei	Brun; Cripo; Dona	3:07
8.	"Everest" (featuring Thasup)	S. Mattei; D. Mattei; Francesco Micarelli	D. Mattei	Brun; Dona; Thasup	2:15
9.	"Niagara"	S. Mattei	Donadei; D. Mattei; Lazzarin	Cripo; Dona; Thasup	2:56
10.	"Abbey Road"	S. Mattei	S. Mattei	Brun; Dona	2:56
11.	"Giorni tristi"	S. Mattei	Donadei; D. Mattei; Lorenzo Pacini	Dona; Loryy; Thasup	3:08
12.	"Eravamo un'idea" (featuring Mecna)	S. Mattei; Corrado Grilli	Brun; Donadei; Marco Ferrario	Dona; Lvnar	2:48
13.	"Mi penserai" (featuring Elisa)	S. Mattei; Elisa Toffoli	Brun; Donadei	Brun; Dona	4:09
14.	"Freddo dentro"	S. Mattei	Brun; Donadei	Brun; Dona	2:49
15.	"Te ne vai"	S. Mattei; Niccolò Moriconi	Brun; Donadei	Brun; Dona	2:40
16.	"Mamma" (outro)	S. Mattei	S. Mattei; Donadei	Dona	2:53
Total length:					45:38

Che me ne faccio del tempo – Digital version bonus
No.	Title	Lyrics	Music	Producer(s)	Length
6.	"Sabato Sera" (featuring Enrico Nigiotti)	Sara Mattei, Enrico Nigiotti, Jacopo Angelo Ettorre	Sara Mattei, Alessandro Donadei, Enrico Brun	Cripo, Dona, Enrico Brun	3:03
13.	"L'ultimo bacio" (with Mecna; originally performed by Carmen Consoli)	Carmen Consoli	Consoli	Brun; Dona	2:12

== Charts ==
Chart performance for Che me ne faccio del tempo
Chart (2026)	Peak position
Italian Albums (FIMI)	19
