= Universo (Mara Sattei album) =

Studio album by Mara Sattei
- Released: 14 January 2022
- Recorded: 2020–2021
- Genre: Pop; urban; electronic music
- Length: 40:34
- Label: Arista; Columbia; Sony Music
- Producer: Thasup

Mara Sattei chronology
Universo (2022)	Casa Gospel (2024)

Singles from Universo
- 1. "Scusa" Released: 9 April 2021; 2. "Ciò che non dici" Released: 3 December 2021; 3. "Parentesi" Released: 14 January 2022

Universo (transl. Universe) is the debut studio album by Italian singer-songwriter Mara Sattei, released on 14 January 2022 by Arista, Columbia and Sony Music.

== Description ==
The singer-songwriter wrote all fourteen tracks, with Thasup producing and co-writing. Singers Giorgia, Gazzelle, Carl Brave and Tedua also contribute vocals and songwriting to the album. Mara Sattei explained in an interview with Vanity Fair Italia:

I liked being able to represent a series of stories I experience, each through a song on the album, as if they were many small parts of me. I sing my many facets, showing the combination of different worlds that are the result of research my brother and I have conducted over the years. And also because I'm passionate about stars and the beauty of creation. I love the Universe.

== Promotion ==
The first single released was the song "Scusa" on 9 April 2021. On 3 December the second single "Ciò che non dici" was released.

On 14 January 2022, "Parentesi", a single featuring Giorgia, was released, concurrently with the album. The two singers performed on the talent show Amici di Maria De Filippi.

== Track listing ==
Universo track listing
No.	Title	Lyrics	Music	Producer(s)	Length
1.	"Universo" (intro)	Sara Mattei	Davide Mattei	Thasup	2:01
2.	"Blu intenso" (featuring Tedua)	S. Mattei; Mario Molinari	D. Mattei	Thasup	3:05
3.	"Cicatrici"	S. Mattei	D. Mattei	Thasup	2:26
4.	"Tetris" (featuring Carl Brave)	S. Mattei; Carlo Luigi Coraggio	D. Mattei	Thasup	3:40
5.	"Ciò che non dici"	S. Mattei	D. Mattei	Thasup	2:54
6.	"Tamigi"	S. Mattei	D. Mattei	Thasup	2:58
7.	"Parentesi" (featuring Giorgia)	S. Mattei; Giorgia Todrani	D. Mattei	Thasup	3:33
8.	"Shot"	S. Mattei	D. Mattei	Thasup	2:54
9.	"Antartide"	S. Mattei	D. Mattei	Thasup	2:03
10.	"0 rischi nel love" (featuring Thasup)	S. Mattei; D. Mattei	D. Mattei	Thasup	2:33
11.	"Sabbie mobili"	S. Mattei	D. Mattei	Thasup	3:26
12.	"Occhi stelle" (featuring Gazzelle)	S. Mattei; Flavio Bruno Pardini	D. Mattei	Thasup	2:34
13.	"Scusa"	S. Mattei	D. Mattei	Thasup	3:02
14.	"Perle"	S. Mattei	D. Mattei	Thasup	3:25
Total length:					40:34

== Charts ==
Chart performance for Universo
Chart (2022)	Peak position
Italian Albums (FIMI)	7
