= Parentesi =

Single by Mara Sattei featuring Giorgia

from the album Universo
- Language: Italian
- Released: 14 January 2022
- Recorded: 2021
- Genre: Pop soul
- Length: 3:33
- Label: Sony Music
- Songwriters: Sara Mattei; Giorgia Todrani; Davide Mattei
- Producer: Tha Supreme

Mara Sattei featuring Giorgia singles chronology
"Ciò che non dici" (2021)	"Parentesi" (2022)	"La dolce vita" (2022)

Giorgia singles chronology
"Scatola nera" (2021)	"Parentesi" (2022)	"Normale" (2022)

Music video
- "Parentesi" on YouTube

"Parentesi" is a song written and recorded by Italian singers Mara Sattei and Giorgia. The song was released on 14 January 2022 as the third single from Sattei's debut studio album Universo through Sony Music.

== Composition ==
The song was written by the two singers with Tha Supreme, Sattei's brother, who worked on the trak as music producer. Sattei explained the meaning of the song:

""Parentesi" is a song about the beauty of feeling free and light at times, even in the midst of the chaos of our thoughts. All the most important parentheses in our lives are made up of emotions and memories that remain unchanged over time, holding a space of their own within our chapters."

Sattei told about her decision to collaborate with Giorgia in an interview for Il Fatto Quotidiano:

"I immediately thought of her because while I was writing the song I was imagining Rome and Trastevere in winter. [...] We talked to each other and she turned out to be sunny, fantastic and gave me so many positive vibes. I didn't realize right away that I was going to do a song with Giorgia, but in the end it was a unique experience, we created very nice nuances for the song.""

== Critical reception ==
Fabio Fiume of All Music Italia gave the song a score of 5 out of 10, which although he found the single to have "personality" and "recognizability" compared to Sattei's previous musical choices, he called it "monotonous" in which "it all sounds like it's about to explode but in the end it doesn't."

== Music video ==
The music video for the song, directed by Gaetano Morbioli, was released on July 16, 2011, through the Sattei's YouTube channel.

== Charts ==
Chart (2016)	Peak position
Italy (FIMI)	56
Italy Airplay (EarOne)	24

== Certifications ==
Certifications for "Parentesi"
Region	Certification	Certified units/sales
Italy (FIMI)	Gold	50,000^{‡}
^{‡} Sales+streaming figures based on certification alone.
