= Destri (song) =

Single by Gazzelle

from the album OK
- Released: 25 September 2020
- Genre: Indie rock, indie pop
- Length: 3:05
- Label: Maciste Dischi
- Songwriters: Gazzelle (lyrics and music), Federico Nardelli (music)
- Producers: Federico Nardelli, Giordano Colombo

Gazzelle singles chronology
"Fuori noi" (2020)	"Destri" (2020)	"Lacri-ma" (2020)

"Destri" is a song by Italian indie singer-songwriter Gazzelle, released as a single in 2020 anticipating his third studio album OK, of the following year.

In Italian, destri is the plural form of destro, meaning "right" (in the sense of "opposite to left") or "right-handed"; (Note: It also has other meanings, but this is the main one and, in this context, the most suiting one. For more, please see the Wiktionary entry.) the word destro is also used figuratively to indicate a right-handed punch, as it is the case for this song.

In its debut week, the song peaked #2 on the Italian charts. It is one of Gazzelle's best-known songs, and it has been certified 6-time platinum.

== Song meaning ==
"Destri" is a breakup song talking about two ex-lovers. The protagonist is a boy who has been left by his girlfriend without a real explanation. This has left him disappointed, frustrated and longing for the past days, when they were happy together.
Musically, the song was born as a jam between Gazzelle, playing the piano, and his producer Federico Nardelli, playing guitar. As Gazzelle has stated, the song draws inspiration from the atmosphere of the early 2000s sound.

== Promotional campaign ==
The song has been promoted with an advertising campaign in Rome and Milan, with posters reading "Non è colpa mia" (English: "It is not my fault"), the opening line in the song's chorus.

== Reception ==
Rockol's critic Mattia Marzi praised the song for its "evocative and powerful" arrangements, and noted some Zero Assoluto influences. Davide Cantire from SentireAscoltare criticized it for not going outside from Gazzelle's comfort zone, and for its lyrics described as being "between the banal and the obvious".

== Charts ==
=== Weekly charts ===
Weekly chart performance for "Destri"
Chart (2020)	Peak position
Italy (FIMI)	2
San Marino (SMRRTV Top 50)	38

=== End of the year charts ===
Chart (2020)	Position
Italy (FIMI)	40
Chart (2021)	Position
Italy (FIMI)	35
Chart (2022)	Position
Italy (FIMI)	91

== Certifications ==
Region	Certification	Certified units/sales
Italy (FIMI)	6× Platinum	600,000^{‡}
^{‡} Sales+streaming figures based on certification alone.
