= Duemilaminuti =

Single by Mara Sattei
- Language: Italian
- Released: 8 February 2023
- Recorded: 2022
- Genre: Pop soul
- Length: 3:44.
- Label: Sony Music
- Songwriters: Damiano David; Enrico Brun; Davide Mattei
- Producer: Tha Supreme

Mara Sattei singles chronology
"Vuoto dentro" (2022)	"Duemilaminuti" (2023)	"Il mio nome Remix" (2022)

Music video
- "Duemilaminuti" on YouTube

"Duemilaminuti" is song recorded by Italian singer Mara Sattei. The song was released on 8 February 2023 through Sony Music Italy.

The song, written by Måneskin's frontman Damiano David, competed at the Sanremo Music Festival 2023, making the singer's first participation on the contest.

== Composition ==
The song was written by the singer's brother Tha Supreme, Enrico Brun, and Damiano David of Måneskin. Mara Sattei explained the creative process and the decision of performing a song not written by herself, unlike the tracks on her debut album Universo:

"It was certainly not belittling. It was a very different experience on a personal level, not least because Damiano wrote the piece from the male point of view and I revised it. [...] It's a dramatic kind of emotional addiction that can happen to anyone, male or female. Damiano showed incredible sensitivity and really succeeded in moving"

== Critical reception ==
Duemilaminuti received mixed reviews from music critics. Rolling Stone Italia, concerning the songs presented during the first night of the Sanremo Festival, gave it a score of 5 out of 10, writing that the singer appeared to be an "old-fashioned interpreter without the class of the greats", with a song described as "bland"; according to the magazine's reviewer Filippo Ferrari, "Duemilaminuti" focuses on the theme of "toxic love, bruises, a heavy relationship".

Gianni Sibilla of Rockol described the song as "very classic and effective", although "a bit already heard" at the Festival, finding that one can feel a lot of the hand in the writing of Damiano David. Mattia Marzi of Il Gazzettino also addressed the songwriters, writing that "of rock and trap there is nothing: the song is a classic ballad". Francesco Prisco of Il Sole 24 Ore, who stated that musically the song is an "effective pop dressed in urban". Andrea Conti of Il Fatto Quotidiano explained that it is a “clean” song and "in its simplicity profound" with lyrics that address "a sincere reflection on why a love story can end".

== Music video ==
The music video for the song, directed by Davide Vicari, was released on 8 February 2023, through the Sattei's YouTube channel.

== Charts ==
=== Weekly charts ===
Chart (2023)	Peak position
Italy (FIMI)	10
Italy Airplay (EarOne)	22

=== Yar-end charts ===
Chart (2023)	Position
Italy (FIMI)	43

== Certifications ==
Certifications for "Duemilaminuti"
Region	Certification	Certified units/sales
Italy (FIMI)	2× Platinum	200,000^{‡}
^{‡} Sales+streaming figures based on certification alone.
