= Gazzelle =

Italian singer-songwriter

- Gazzelle performing in Rome on 3 March 2019

Background information
- Born: Flavio Bruno Pardini; 7 December 1989 (age 36); Rome, Italy
- Genres: Pop; indie pop
- Occupations: Singer; songwriter
- Instrument: Vocals
- Years active: 2012–present
- Label: Maciste Dischi

Flavio Bruno Pardini (born 7 December 1989), known professionally as Gazzelle, is an Italian singer-songwriter.

== Career ==
His debut single, "Quella te", was released by Maciste Dischi in late 2016. At the time, he refused to appear or reveal any details about himself. He later explained that he wanted to preserve his privacy and be one step back from his songs, in order to let people focus on his music. His real identity and image were released in March 2017, when he released his debut album, Superbattito, and embarked on his first concert tour. One year later, the album was re-released under the title Megasuperbattito, also featuring the singles "Sayonara", "Stelle filanti" and "Martelli".

His second studio album, Punk (2018), was preceded by the singles "Tutta la vita", "Sopra" and "Scintille". In March 2018, he performed for the first time in indoor sports arenas Mediolanum Forum in Milan and PalaLottomatica in Rome. He also took part in the 2019 International Workers' Day concert in Piazza San Giovanni Laterano, Rome, annually supported by Italian trade unions CGIL, CISL and UIL. A new edition of the album, Post Punk, was released in late 2019. It also included the singles "Polynesia", "Settembre" and "Una canzone che non so". In order to promote the album, he embarked on an indoor tour in January and February 2020.

He competed in the Sanremo Music Festival 2024 with the song "Tutto qui". In March 2024, he kicked off his national tour at a sold-out show in Padua on International Women's Day. Indi, his fifth album, was released on 24 January 2025.

His stage name was chosen without any connection with Pardini's real personality, mainly because of the word's sound, and after Adidas Gazelle sneakers.

== Discography ==
=== Albums ===
List of studio albums, with selected chart positions
Title	Details	Peak chart positions	Certifications
Title	Details	ITA	Certifications
Superbattito (re-released as Megasuperbattito)	Released: 3 March 2017; Label: Maciste Dischi; Format: LP, CD, digital download, streaming	13	FIMI: Platinum
Punk (re-released as Post punk)	Released: 30 November 2018; Label: Maciste Dischi; Format: LP, CD, digital download, streaming	9	FIMI: 3× Platinum
Ok (re-released as Ok un cazzo)	Released: 12 February 2021; Label: Maciste Dischi; Format: LP, CD, digital download, streaming	1	FIMI: 3× Platinum
Dentro	Released: 19 May 2023; Label: Maciste Dischi; Format: LP, CD, digital download, streaming	4	FIMI: Platinum
Indi	Released: 24 January 2025; Label: Maciste Dischi; Format: LP, CD, cassette, digital download, streaming	3	FIMI: Platinum

=== Singles ===
List of singles as lead artist, with selected chart positions, showing year released and album name
Title	Year	Peak chart positions	Certifications	Album
Title	Year	ITA	Certifications	Album
"Quella te"	2016	—	FIMI: Gold	Superbattito
"Nmrpm"	2017	—	FIMI: Gold	Superbattito
"Zucchero filato"	2017	—		Superbattito
"Sayonara"	2017	—	FIMI: Gold	Megasuperbattito
"Stelle filanti"	2017	—		Megasuperbattito
"Nero"	2017	—	FIMI: Gold	Megasuperbattito
"Meglio così"	2017	—	FIMI: Gold	Megasuperbattito
"Martelli"	2018	60	FIMI: Gold	Megasuperbattito
"Tutta la vita"	2018	59	FIMI: Gold	Punk
"Sopra"	2018	41	FIMI: 2× Platinum	Punk
"Scintille"	2018	62	FIMI: Platinum	Punk
"Punk"	2018	—	FIMI: Gold	Punk
"Polynesia"	2019	24	FIMI: Platinum	Post Punk
"Settembre"	2019	14	FIMI: Gold	Post Punk
"Una canzone che non so"	2019	25	FIMI: Platinum	Post Punk
"Vita paranoia"	2019	57	FIMI: Platinum	Post Punk
"Ora che ti guardo bene"	2020	11	FIMI: Gold	Non-album single
"Destri"	2020	2	FIMI: 6× Platinum	Ok
"Lacri-ma"	2020	21	FIMI: Gold	Ok
"Scusa"	2020	5	FIMI: Platinum	Ok
"Belva"	2021	8	FIMI: Gold	Ok
"Tuttecose" (with Mara Sattei)	2021	16	FIMI: 2× Platinum	Ok un cazzo
"Fottuta canzone"	2021	—		Ok un cazzo
"Idem"	2023	21	FIMI: Platinum	Dentro
"Quello che eravamo prima" (with Thasup)	2023	30	FIMI: Gold	Dentro
"Milioni" (with Fulminacci)	2023	72	FIMI: Gold	Dentro
"Tutto qui"	2024	6	FIMI: 2× Platinum	Indi
"Mezzo secondo"	2024	24	FIMI: Gold	Indi
"Come il pane"	2024	25		Indi
"Noi no"	2025	19		Indi
"Da capo a 12"	2025	90		Indi
"Stupido"	2025	75		Non-album singles
"Livia"	2026	72		Non-album singles
"Ogni volta che sei qui"	2026	8		Non-album singles

=== Other charted songs ===
List of other charted songs, with selected chart positions, showing year released and album name
Title	Year	Peak chart positions	Album
Title	Year	ITA	Album
"Piango anche io"	2025	69	Indi
"Grattacieli meteoriti gli angeli"	2025	20	Indi
"Stammi bene"	2025	48	Indi
"Non lo sapevo"	2025	87	Indi
