= Altalene =

Single by Slait and Tha Supreme featuring Mara Sattei and Coez

from the album Bloody Vinyl 3
- Released: 2 October 2020
- Length: 3:07
- Label: Arista; Sony
- Producers: Slait; Tha Supreme

Slait singles chronology
"AK77" (2019)	"Altalene" (2020)	"Testamento (la resa dei conti)" (2021)

Tha Supreme singles chronology
"Offline" (2020)	"Altalene" (2020)	"Guaio" (2020)

Mara Sattei singles chronology
"Spigoli" (2020)	"Altalene" (2020)	"Scusa" (2020)

Coez singles chronology
"Motivo" (2020)	"Altalene" (2020)	"Aggio perzo 'o suonno" (2021)

Music video
- "Altalene" on YouTube

"Altalene" is a single by Italian rappers and producers Slait and Tha Supreme, released on 2 October 2020 as the sole single from the mixtape Bloody Vinyl 3. The track features guest vocals by Italian singers Mara Sattei and Coez.

The song topped the Italian singles chart and was certified triple platinum.

== Music video ==
The music video, directed by Enea Colombi, was released on 21 December 2020 on Mara Sattei's YouTube channel.

== Charts ==
=== Weekly charts ===
Chart performance for "Altalene"
Chart (2020)	Peak position
Italy (FIMI)	1
Italy Airplay (EarOne)	12

=== Year-end charts ===
2020 year-end chart performance for "Altalene"
Chart	Position
Italy (FIMI)	51

2021 year-end chart performance for "Altalene"
Chart	Position
Italy (FIMI)	70

== Certifications ==
Region	Certification	Certified units/sales
Italy (FIMI)	3× Platinum	210,000^{‡}
^{‡} Sales+streaming figures based on certification alone.
