= Blunt a Swishland =

Single by Tha Supreme

from the album 23 6451
- Released: 8 November 2019
- Length: 2:48
- Label: Epic
- Producer: Tha Supreme

Tha Supreme singles chronology
"Yoshi" (2019)	"Blunt a Swishland" (2019)	"Calmo" (2020)

Music video
- "Blunt a Swishland" on YouTube

"Blunt a Swishland" (stylized as blun7 a swishland) is a song by Italian rapper and record producer Tha Supreme. It was released on 8 November 2019 by Epic Records as fifth single from the artist's debut studio album 23 6451.

The song topped the Italian singles chart and was certified quadruple platinum.

== Music video ==
The music video, directed by Erika De Nicola, was released on 10 March 2020 on the rapper's YouTube channel.

== Charts ==
=== Weekly charts ===
Chart performance for "Blunt a Swishland"
Chart (2019–20)	Peak position
Italy (FIMI)	1
Italy Airplay (EarOne)	18

=== Year-end charts ===
2019 year-end chart performance for "Blunt a Swishland"
Chart	Position
Italy (FIMI)	45

2020 year-end chart performance for "Blunt a Swishland"
Chart	Position
Italy (FIMI)	19

== Certifications ==
Region	Certification	Certified units/sales
Italy (FIMI)	4× Platinum	280,000^{‡}
^{‡} Sales+streaming figures based on certification alone.
