= Indi (album) =

2025 studio album by Gazzelle

Studio album by Gazzelle
- Released: 24 January 2025
- Genre: Indie pop
- Length: 35:34
- Labels: Maciste Dischi; Warner Italy
- Producers: Gazzelle; Federico Nardelli

Gazzelle chronology
Dentro (2023)	Indi (2025)

Singles from Indi
- 1. "Tutto qui" Released: 7 February 2024; 2. "Mezzo secondo" Released: 24 May 2024; 3. "Come il pane" Released: 29 November 2024; 4. "Noi no" Released: 3 January 2025; 5. "Da capo a 12" Released: 14 March 2025; 6. "Stupido" Released: 9 May 2025

Indi is the fifth studio album by the Italian singer-songwriter Gazzelle, released on 24 January 2025 by the labels Maciste Dischi and Warner Italy.

The album contains the song Tutto qui, with which the singer-songwriter competed at the Sanremo Music Festival 2024, finishing in eleventh place at the end of the event.

== Background and description ==
In January 2025, mysterious black and white posters with the words "L'Indi è morto" appeared in the cities of Rome and Milan, arousing curiosity among fans and music enthusiasts. A few days later, Gazzelle revealed that these posters were part of the promotional campaign for his fifth studio album, entitled Indi. The official announcement took place via the artist's social channels, accompanied by a video inspired by the film Forrest Gump, in which Gazzelle, playing the protagonist, announced the release date of the new album.

The album consists of eleven tracks that range from unreleased songs written by the singer-songwriter himself with the collaboration of authors and producers, including Federico Nardelli. The project is available in various formats, including standard CD, audio cassette, standard vinyl, picture vinyl and autographed editions.

== Cover ==
The album cover depicts an ant, a symbol chosen to represent the solidity of Gazzelle's artistic path and the power of music in its simplicity.

== Promotion ==
=== Singles ===
The lead single from the album, Tutto qui, was released on 7 February 2024 in conjunction with Gazzelle's participation in the 74th Sanremo Festival. On 24 May 2024, Mezzo secondo was released as the second single from the album. On 29 November 2024, Come il pane was released as the third single from the album. The fourth single from the album, Noi no, was released on 3 January 2025. The fifth single from the album was Da capo a 12, released on 14 March 2025.

On 9 May 2025, Stupido was released as the lead single from the digital re-release of the album.

=== Tour ===
To promote the album, the Gazzelle announced two stadium concerts: on 7 June 2025 at the Circo Massimo in Rome and on 22 June, at the San Siro Stadium in Milan.

== Track listing ==
All lyrics are written by Flavio Bruno Pardini; all music is composed by Flavio Bruno Pardini and Federico Nardelli.

No.	Title	Length
1.	"Piango anche io"	3:09
2.	"Grattacieli meteoriti gli angeli"	3:24
3.	"Noi no"	3:16
4.	"Stammi bene"	3:35
5.	"Come il pane"	3:52
6.	"Da capo a 12"	3:34
7.	"Foglie"	2:20
8.	"Il mio amico si sposa"	1:56
9.	"Tutto qui"	3:31
10.	"Mezzo secondo"	3:26
11.	"Non lo sapevo"	3:28

Bonus track on the digital re-release

No.	Title	Length
12.	"Stupido"	3:10

== Charts ==
Chart performance for Indi
Chart (2025)	Peak position
Italian Albums (FIMI)	3

== Certifications ==
Certifications for Indi
Region	Certification	Certified units/sales
Italy (FIMI)	Platinum	50,000^{‡}
^{‡} Sales+streaming figures based on certification alone.
