= Calmo =

Single by Shiva featuring Tha Supreme

from the EP Routine
- Released: 23 January 2020
- Length: 2:31
- Label: Jive; Sony
- Producer: Tha Supreme

Shiva singles chronology
"Holly & Benji" (2019)	"Calmo" (2020)	"Gange" (2020)

Tha Supreme singles chronology
"Blunt a Swishland" (2019)	"Calmo" (2020)	"Dilemme (Remix)" (2020)

"Calmo" is a song by Italian rapper Shiva featuring Tha Supreme. It was produced by Tha Supreme, and released on 23 January 2020 as the only single from Shiva's second EP Routine.

The song topped the Italian singles chart and was certified platinum in Italy.

== Charts ==
Weekly chart performance for "Calmo"
Chart (2020)	Peak position
Italy (FIMI)	1

== Certifications ==
Region	Certification	Certified units/sales
Italy (FIMI)	Platinum	70,000^{‡}
^{‡} Sales+streaming figures based on certification alone.
