= Le cose che non sai di me =

2026 single by Mara Sattei

Single by Mara Sattei

from the album Che me ne faccio del tempo
- Released: 25 February 2026
- Genre: Pop
- Length: 3:24
- Label: Epic
- Composers: Davide Mattei; Alessandro Donadei; Enrico Brun
- Lyricist: Sara Mattei
- Producers: Dona; Enrico Brun; Thasup

Mara Sattei singles chronology
"Sopra di me" (2025)	"Le cose che non sai di me" (2026)	"L'ultimo bacio" (2026)

"Le cose che non sai di me" ("Things You Don't Know About Me") is a song co-written and recorded by Italian singer Mara Sattei, released on 25 February 2026 and included in the deluxe edition of her third studio album, Che me ne faccio del tempo.

The song was presented in competition during the Sanremo Music Festival 2026.

== Background ==
"Le cose che non sai di me" was written by Sattei herself, alongside Alessandro Donadei (Dona), Davide Mattei (Thasup), and Enrico Brun, the latter three in whom they also produced. Having marked Sattei's second participation in the Sanremo Festival, in a short interview given to TV Sorrisi e Canzoni, she stated that "it's about the beginning of her love story with her boyfriend Alessandro. It began during a studio session; we had no expectations, and it came out magical. It's a sincere, welcoming, and very sweet song."

== Music video ==
The music video for "Le cose che non sai di me", directed by Lorenzo Silvestri and filmed at the violin museum in Cremona, was published in conjunction with the release of the song through Sattei's YouTube channel.

== Promotion ==
Italian broadcaster RAI organised the 76th edition of the Sanremo Music Festival between 24 and 28 February 2026. On 30 November 2025, Sattei was announced among the participants of the festival, with the title of her competing entry revealed the following 14 December.

== Charts ==
Chart performance for "Le cose che non sai di me"
Chart (2026)	Peak position
Italy (FIMI)	28
Italy Airplay (EarOne)	66
