= Lous and the Yakuza =

Congolese-Belgian musician, model, and artist (born 1996)

- Born: Marie-Pierra Kakoma; 26 May 1996 (age 30); Lubumbashi, Zaire
- Occupations: Singer; rapper; songwriter; model; artist
- Musical career
- Genres: R&B; hip hop; pop
- Instrument: Vocals
- Years active: 2015–present
- Label: Columbia Records
- Website: lousandtheyakuza.fr

Marie-Pierra Kakoma (French pronunciation: [maʁi pjɛʁa kakɔma]; born 27 May 1996), known professionally as Lous and the Yakuza, is a Congolese-Belgian singer, rapper, songwriter, model, and artist. She rose to prominence after the release of her debut single "Dilemme" in September 2019, which was followed by "Tout est gore" in December 2019 and "Solo" in March 2020. Her debut album, Gore, produced by el Guincho, was released on 16 October 2020.

== Early life ==
Lous was born Marie-Pierra Kakoma in Lubumbashi, Zaire (present-day Democratic Republic of the Congo) on 27 May 1996. Her parents were prominent doctors in the Democratic Republic of the Congo at the time of her birth. Her Congolese father was a gynecologist, and her Rwandan mother was a pediatrician. Kakoma's mother was imprisoned in the Congo for two months during the Second Congo War in 1998 due to her ethnicity. After her father secured her mother's release, she fled to Belgium with one of Kakoma's sisters. Kakoma and the rest of her siblings joined their mother in Belgium two years later in 2000, while their father remained in the Congo. The family relocated to Rwanda in 2005 before permanently returning to Brussels in 2011.

Kakoma's interest in music began at a young age while she was surrounded by music due to her father's interest in the European classical works of Mozart, Chopin, Vivaldi, and Beethoven. She began writing her own music at the age of seven. Upon her family's relocation to Belgium at the age of 15, she began writing letters to Columbia Records in the hopes of being signed to the label. At the age of eighteen, Kakoma was disinherited by her parents for wanting to be a singer, rather than a doctor, and at the age of nineteen, she was kicked out of her home. In the period of homelessness that followed, she lived on the streets for several months before settling in a music studio, where she would sleep and record music, while commuting back and forth between a variety of service jobs. Over three years, Kakoma recorded 52 songs, comprising seven EPs. In 2016, she appeared in the music video for "BruxellesVie" by Belgian artist Damso.

== Career ==
Kakoma adopted the moniker Lous and the Yakuza from an anagram for soul, the source of her musical passion, and Yakuza, Japan's organized crime syndicate, the name of which she uses to describe her "crew" of collaborators whom she relies on create her music. Lous was first discovered by her manager, Miguel Fernandez, after he found her releases on the internet. Beginning in 2017, she realized her passion to create an album, enlisted many of her close friends to form a supporting band, and began performing at bars and nightclubs in the Brussels underground culture. In late 2017, Lous was invited to perform an acoustic set for La ChillZone, after which she was signed to Columbia Records through Sony Music in France, at the age of 22. On 15 June 2018, "Le Ridicule Ne Tue Pas" was released, a collaboration between Lous and the Yakuza and the French electronic group BSSMNT.

After a six-month search for a producer that fit her aspirations, Kakoma took notice of Spanish producer el Guincho, following his work on Rosalía's single "Malamente". Lous released her debut single "Dilemme" on 19 September 2019, which was produced by el Guincho and Ponko. The song propelled Kakoma into prominence after it received viral acclaim, accumulating more than 20 million streams on Spotify, 8.9 million views on YouTube, and topping Spotify Italia's Viral 50 chart. The song's music video, directed by Wendy Morgan, captures the various identities that Lous holds in a variety of environments, meant to represent her life transition from Congo to Belgium. A remix featuring Italian rapper tha Supreme and Italian singer Mara Sattei was released on 1 April 2020. At the 2019 Red Bull Elektropedia Awards, Lous and the Yakuza won the silver medal in the "Fresh on the Scene" category. Lous's second single, "Tout est gore", also produced by el Guincho, was released on 6 December 2019. The song gained popularity after actress Issa Rae shared a clip from the video on social media. On 20 March 2020, Lous released her third single, "Solo", with an accompanying music video directed by Wendy Morgan and Kevin Bago. An associated documentary short film, titled Solo (Genesis) was released on 14 April 2020. All three singles were included on her debut album, Gore, which was produced by el Guincho. Originally scheduled to be released on 5 June 2020, the album was later delayed until fall of 2020.

On 27 February 2020, Kakoma modeled for French luxury fashion house Chloé during Paris Fashion Week, where she participated in the runway presentation of their fall/winter 2020/21 collection. In March 2020, Lous and the Yakuza was included in Spotify's RADAR initiative, which aims to broaden artists' worldwide reach through marketed social channels and curated playlists.

On 26 February 2021, she released her single "Je ne sais pas", featuring Italian rapper Sfera Ebbasta. This song was also a soundtrack in the game Need For Speed: Unbound. On 4 March, she performed at the Sanremo Music Festival 2021 in a duet with Gaia, with the song "Mi sono innamorato di te" by Luigi Tenco. On 8 August, she joined Woodkid to perform at the handover ceremony from the Tokyo 2020 Olympic Games to Paris 2024. In 2023, she branched into acting with a guest role as DJ in John Wick: Chapter 4.

Kakoma's music has been described as a "silky" combination of trap, R&B, and pop.

== Public image ==
Kakoma is noted for her public image, namely the graphic symbol painted on her forehead, which has been described as the letter 'Y' with a dot in the middle and has drawn comparisons to Prince's Love Symbol #2. Kakoma herself designed the symbol, titled les mains levées vers le ciel (hands lifted toward the sky), as a symbol meant to represent two arms connecting the earth to the sky. Her religious faith and belief in God served as her primary motivation for the creation of the symbol. Lous has also gained recognition for her fashion and style, which draws inspiration from such artists as FKA Twigs and Erykah Badu.

== Personal life ==
As a child, Kakoma had a passion for manga and found interest in themes related to the Middle Ages and antiquity, particularly the bravery and heroism of knights, such as those described in the writings of Cicero. During her youth, she was a sprinter and also played American football for seven years due to her interest in Eyeshield 21. Kakoma has explored creative writing as a form of expression since childhood, when her interest in being a novelist inspired her to frequently write novels of over 300 pages in length. In addition to music and fashion, Lous is an avid painter, designer, and artist, frequently designing clothing and creating manga and graphic novel illustrations.

== Discography ==
=== Studio albums ===
List of studio albums
Title	Details	Peak chart positions		
Title	Details	BEL (FL)	BEL (WA)	FRA
Gore	Released: 16 October 2020; Label: Columbia; Format: Digital download, Streaming	23	16	39
Iota	Released: 11 November 2022	130	47	72

=== Singles ===
==== As lead artist ====
Title	Year	Peak chart positions			Certifications	Album
Title	Year	BEL (FL) Tip	BEL (WA) Tip	ITA	Certifications	Album
"Dilemme"	2019	—	7	38		Gore
"Tout est gore"	2019	39	—	—		Gore
"Solo"	2020	—	34	—		Gore
"Dilemme (Remix)" (with Tha Supreme and Mara Sattei)	2020	—	—	3	FIMI: Platinum	Non-album singles
"Laisse-moi" (featuring Hamza)	2020	—	—	—		Non-album singles
"Bon Acteur"	2020	38	25	—		Gore
"Amigo" (Note: "Amigo" with Joey Badass was released as a standalone single whilst the solo version is included on Gore.) (solo or with Joey Badass)	2020	16	14	—		Gore
"Je ne sais pas" (featuring Sfera Ebbasta)	2021	—	—	3	FIMI: Gold	Non-album single
"Sable" (with L'Or du Commun)	2021	—	—	—		Avant la nuit
"Kisé"	2022	—	—	—		Iota
"Monsters"	2022	—	—	—		Iota
"Handle Me" (featuring Adekunle Gold)	2022	—	—	—		Non-album single
"Hiroshima"	2022	—	—	—		Iota
"—" denotes a recording which failed to chart or was not released to that format.

==== As featured artist ====
Title	Year	Peak chart positions	Album
Title	Year	BEL (WA) Tip	Album
"Le ridicule ne tue pas" (BSSMNT featuring Lous and the Yakuza)	2018	13	Non-album single
"Mascarade" (Yendry featuring Lous and the Yakuza)	2022	—	Non-album single

=== Other charted songs ===
Title	Year	Peak chart positions	Album
Title	Year	FRA	Album
"Coeur en miettes" (Damso featuring Lous and the Yakuza)	2020	6	QALF

== Awards and nominations ==
Award Ceremony	Year	Nominated work	Category	Result
Berlin Music Video Awards	2020	DILEMME	Best Song	Nominated
