= Spigoli =

Single by Carl Brave featuring Mara Sattei and Tha Supreme

from the album Coraggio
- Released: 12 May 2020
- Length: 4:16
- Label: Island; Universal
- Producers: Carl Brave; Tha Supreme

Carl Brave singles chronology
"Marionette" (2020)	"Spigoli" (2020)	"Fratellì" (2020)

Mara Sattei singles chronology
"Dilemme (Remix)" (2020)	"Spigoli" (2020)	"Altalene" (2020)

Tha Supreme singles chronology
"Dilemme (Remix)" (2020)	"Spigoli" (2020)	"Offline" (2020)

"Spigoli" is a song by Italian singer-songwriter Carl Brave featuring Mara Sattei and Tha Supreme. It was released on 12 May 2020 as the third single from Brave's second studio album Coraggio. It entered radio rotation on 5 June 2020.

The song topped the Italian singles chart and was certified triple platinum.

== Composition ==
The song was written and performed by Carl Brave together with Mara Sattei and Tha Supreme, who also co-produced the track with Brave. Musically, it combines hip hop and trap elements with electronic sounds, while retaining a pop-oriented melodic structure.

== Charts ==
=== Weekly charts ===
Chart performance for "Spigoli"
Chart (2020)	Peak position
Italy (FIMI)	1

=== Year-end charts ===
2020 year-end chart performance for "Spigoli"
Chart	Position
Italy (FIMI)	21

== Certifications ==
Region	Certification	Certified units/sales
Italy (FIMI)	3× Platinum	210,000^{‡}
^{‡} Sales+streaming figures based on certification alone.
