= La dolce vita (Fedez, Tananai and Mara Sattei song) =

Single by Fedez, Tananai and Mara Sattei

from the album Disumano
- Released: 3 June 2022
- Genre: Pop; twist
- Length: 3:08
- Label: Sony Music
- Songwriters: Federico Lucia; Alberto Cotta Ramusino; Paolo Antonacci; Jacopo D'Amico; Davide Simonetta
- Producer: Davide Simonetta

Fedez singles chronology
"Sapore" (2021)	"La dolce vita" (2022)	"Viola" (2022)

Tananai singles chronology
"Sesso occasionale" (2022)	"La dolce vita" (2022)	"Pasta" (2022)

Mara Sattei singles chronology
"Parentesi" (2022)	"La dolce vita" (2022)	"Vuoto dentro" (2022)

"La dolce vita" is a song by Italian singers Fedez, Tananai and Mara Sattei, released on 3 June 2022 by Sony Music and featured on the digital reissue of Fedez's sixth studio album Disumano.

The song was written by Fedez and Tananai with co-writing contribution by Dargen D'Amico, Paolo Antonacci and Davide Simonetta, and produced by the latter. It was released by Sony Music on 3 June 2022. "La dolce vita" peaked at number one on the Italian FIMI Singles Chart and was certified platinum both in Italy and Switzerland after its release.

== Background ==
The track, which marked the second collaboration between Fedez and Tananai after "Le madri degli altri", and the first collaboration with Mara Sattei, was recorded three days before Fedez's pancreatic cancer removal operation:

Three days before the operation to remove my pancreas I decided to go into the studio to record the vocals for this song I was working on before my life changed so abruptly, I think I did it a bit to distract myself from everything that was happening to me. [...] In the lyrics I say 'life without love will never do me any good' and never as in those days as today this phrase could very well be my little mantra. As soon as I was discharged, I returned to the studio the same day. [...] The birth of this song made me realise how important music is in my life, how it is almost a vital need, the deepest part of me, and I want to dedicate it to my wife, my beautiful children and all the people who worked on it.

The song musically is twist, inspired by Paul Anka's "Diana" and "Twist and Shout" by The Beatles, with a rapping part. Mara Sattei spoke about the creative process behind the song's writing and musical choices:

This is the first time I'm singing a chorus that is not my own because I usually write the songs myself, but it is nice to sew other people's words onto myself. And then I've always been fascinated by the 60s, and only music has the power to transport you to other eras. [...] I would have liked to explore how music was enjoyed back then. Without the platforms and social media, but with turntables and radio. I don't ask myself, though, if it was an easier or more difficult era, it doesn't make sense: everything has its time.

== Reception ==
The song was mostly well received by Italian critics, being dubbed the summer hit of 2022. Gabriele Fazio from Agenzia Giornalistica Italia described the song as "a millimetre-perfect, meticulously concocted sound recipe, starting with the sound of 60s Italian classics", with a lyric that is "simple and straightforward". Less enthusiastic was the review by All Music Italia, assigning a score of 6.5/10, explaining that it was "made precisely to lull us through the hot summer" and noting that although the sounds are a homage to the past, the lyrics feature "a few more daring and relatively modern passages" without, however, finding it up to the standard of the 2021 single "Mille".

On 1 September 2022, the song won two awards at the RTL 102.5 Power Hits Estate Awards, the FIMI Sales Award and the overall Summer Hit Award, respectively.

== Music video ==
The music video for the song was directed by Olmo Parenti, and features Italian influencer Alessia Lanza. The filming took place on the beaches of Rimini, Emilia-Romagna.

== Charts ==
=== Weekly charts ===
Weekly chart performance for "La dolce vita"
Chart (2022)	Peak position
Italy (FIMI)	1
San Marino (SMRRTV Top 50)	2
Switzerland (Schweizer Hitparade)	44

=== Year-end charts ===
2022 year-end chart performance for "La dolce vita"
Chart (2022)	Position
Italy (FIMI)	6

2023 year-end chart performance for "La dolce vita"
Chart (2023)	Position
Italy (FIMI)	85

== Certifications ==
Certifications for "La dolce vita"
Region	Certification	Certified units/sales
Italy (FIMI)	6× Platinum	600,000^{‡}
Switzerland (IFPI Switzerland)	Gold	10,000^{‡}
^{‡} Sales+streaming figures based on certification alone.
