= Gore (Lous and the Yakuza album) =

Studio album by Lous and the Yakuza
- Released: 16 October 2020
- Length: 29:15
- Language: French
- Label: Columbia

Lous and the Yakuza chronology
Gore (2020)	Iota (2022)

Gore is the debut album by Lous and the Yakuza. It was released on 16 October 2020 by Columbia Records.

== Track listing ==
1. "Dilemme" – 3:07
2. "Bon acteur" – 2:19
3. "Telephone sonne" – 3:05
4. "Dans la hess" – 2:49
5. "Tout est gore" – 3:01
6. "Amigo" – 2:36
7. "Messes basses" – 3:14
8. "Courant d'air" – 2:49
9. "Quatre heures du matin" – 3:02
10. "Solo" – 3:13

== Charts ==
Chart performance for Gore
Chart (2020)	Peak position
Belgian Albums (Ultratop Flanders)	23
Belgian Albums (Ultratop Wallonia)	16
French Albums (SNEP)	39
