= Mara Sattei =

Italian singer-songwriter (born 1995)

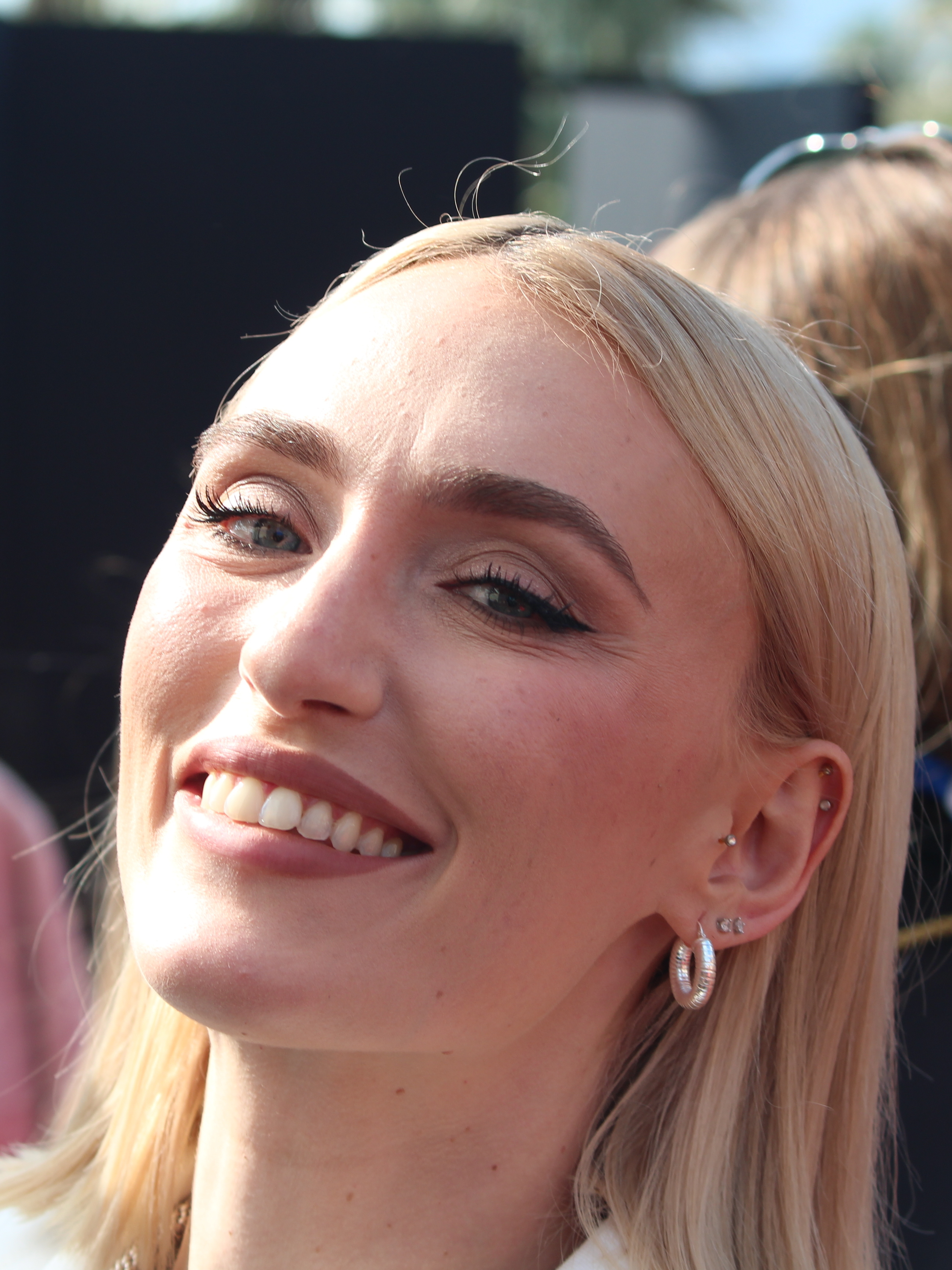
- Mara Sattei in February 2026

Background information
- Born: Sara Mattei; 28 April 1995 (age 31); Rome, Lazio, Italy
- Genres: Pop; hip hop; urban
- Occupations: Singer; songwriter
- Instruments: Vocals; piano
- Works: Discography
- Years active: 2013–present
- Labels: Studio8 / Homies (2015–2017); Epic (2019, 2024–present); Sony Music (2019–present); Arista (2020); Columbia (2021–2023); Island / Universal Italia (2023–2024)
- Partner: Alessandro Donadei (2023–present)

Logo

Sara Mattei (born 28 April 1995), known professionally as Mara Sattei, is an Italian singer-songwriter.

== Biography ==
Mattei was born in Rome and grew up in Fiumicino. She is the older sister of Italian singer and record producer Tha Supreme. Her music career began in 2009, when she started uploading covers of various songs to YouTube. In 2013, she took part in the thirteenth season of the Italian talent show Amici di Maria De Filippi reaching the final stage of the show before being eliminated on the second Live show. After the show, she released her debut EP Frammenti: Acoustic Covers N.1.

After a few years of inactivity, in which she moved to London, in 2019 she resumed her musical career under the pseudonym Mara Sattei, obtained by interchanging the initials of her first and last name.

In 2020, she and Tha Supreme collaborated with Congolese-Belgian singer Lous and the Yakuza on a remix of the single "Dilemme". In the same year, she appeared on the single "Spigoli" by Carl Brave. The two songs reached positions 3 and 1 on the Top Singoli respectively and were certified platinum, marking another success in her career.

On January 14, 2022 she released her first studio album Universo, with the extracted singles "Ciò che non dici" and "Parentesi", the latter in collaboration with Italian singer Giorgia. The album charted on seventh place on the Top Singoli, and was promoted through the Universo tour 2022. In the summer of that year, Sattei also collaborated with Fedez and Tananai on the song "La dolce vita", which reached position 1 on the Top Singoli. The song was certified gold in Switzerland and sextuple platinum in Italy.

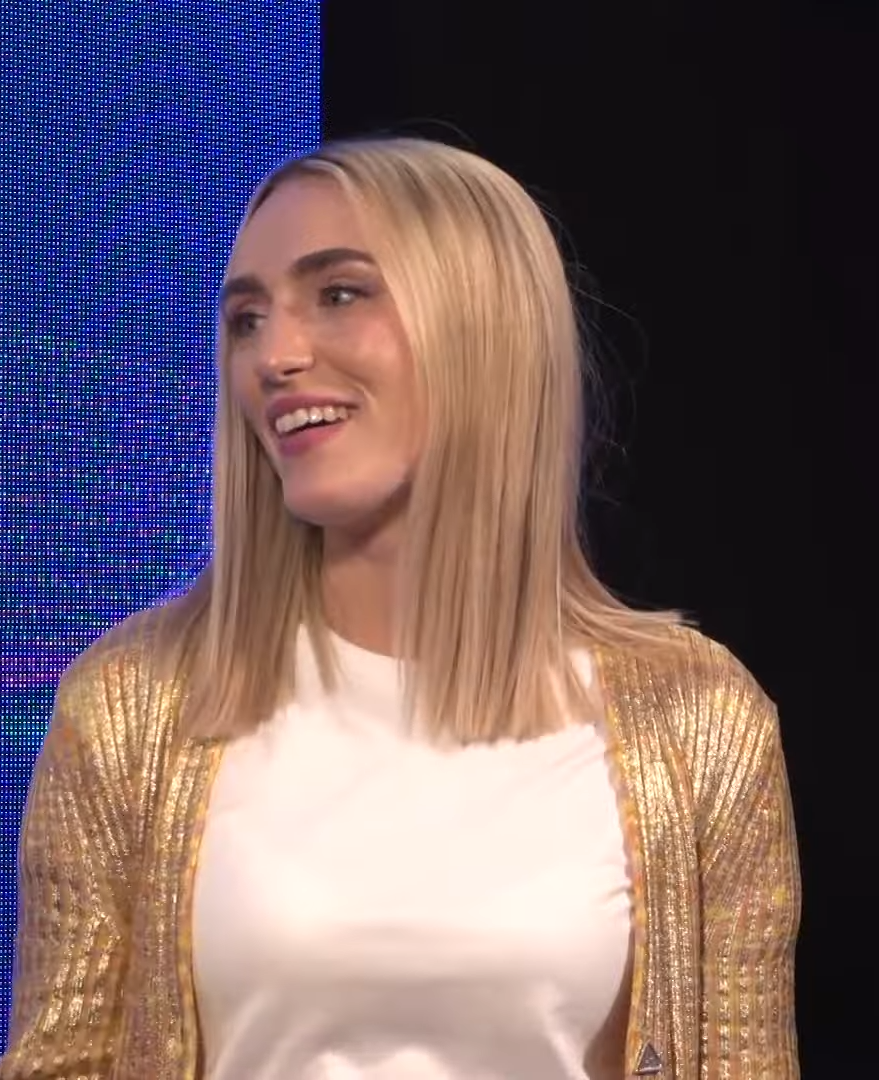
Mara Sattei in February 2023

On 4 December 2022, Mara Sattei's participation in the Sanremo Music Festival 2023 was officially announced. Her entry was titled "Duemilaminuti" and was the result of collaboration with Måneskin's frontman Damiano David and Tha Supreme.

In 2024 she published a collaborative album with his brother Thasup Casa Gospel, which peaked at number two on Italian Album Charts and was certified gold by FIMI. The single "Giorni tristi" was released on 12 September 2025, followed by the single "Sopra di me" on 21 November. The two singles preceded his third studio album, Che me ne faccio del tempo, released digitally on 13 February 2026, and physically on 27 February.

On 30 November 2025, she was announced among the participants of the Sanremo Music Festival 2026. She competed with the song "Le cose che non sai di me", which placed 29th.

== Personal life ==
Since 2023 she has been romantically linked to the guitarist and record producer from Bari Alessandro Donadei, aka Dona.

== Discography ==
- Universo (2022)
- Casa Gospel with Thasup (2024)
- Che me ne faccio del tempo (2026)

== Tours ==
- 2022 – Universo tour 2022
- 2023 – Mara Sattei Summer tour 2023

== Television ==
Year	Title	Network		Role	Notes
2013–2014	Amici di Maria De Filippi	Canale 5	Real Time	Herself / Contestant	Talent show (season 13)

== Participation in singing events ==
- Sanremo Music Festival (Rai 1)
  - 2023 – 19th place with "Duemilaminuti"
  - 2026 – 29th place in the "Champions" section with "Le cose che non sai di me"

== Awards and nominations ==
Year	Award	Nomination	Work	Result	Notes
2022	Music Awards	Multi-platinum single Award	"La dolce vita" (with Fedez and Tananai)	Won	
2022	Music Awards	TIM Summer Hits Award	"La dolce vita" (with Fedez and Tananai)	Won	
2022	RTL 102.5 Power Hits Estate	Overall winner	"La dolce vita" (with Fedez and Tananai)	Won	
2022	RTL 102.5 Power Hits Estate	FIMI Award	"La dolce vita" (with Fedez and Tananai)	Won	
2023	Sanremo Music Festival 2023	CoReCom Award on Violence against Women	"Duemilaminuti"	Won	
