= Thasup =

Italian rapper and record producer (born 2001)

- Born: Davide Mattei; 17 March 2001 (age 25); Rome, Lazio, Italy
- Occupations: Rapper; record producer
- Instruments: Vocals; guitar; piano
- Years active: 2015–present
- Label: Sony Music

Davide Mattei (born 17 March 2001), known by his stage name Thasup, previously Tha Supreme, alternatively known as Yungest Moonstar, is an Italian rapper and record producer.

== Life and career ==
Mattei was born in Rome and grew up in Fiumicino.

His first mainstream success was thanks to the single "Perdonami" by the Italian rapper Salmo, which he produced. Following the success of "Perdonami", Tha Supreme continued releasing songs of his own and producing for other artists such as Marracash, Gemitaiz and Madman, Izi as well as his sister, Mara Sattei. His debut album 23 6451 (leetspeak for LE BASI, Italian for "The Basics") was released on 15 November 2019, collecting over 13 million streams in 24 hours.

He also featured on two Italian number-one singles: "Yoshi" with Machete and "Supreme – L'ego" by Marracash and Sfera Ebbasta.

== Personal life ==
In 2023, Mattei was hospitalised twice due to severe anxiety and panic attacks.

== Controversy ==
On 7 December 2021, Tha Supreme stated on his Instagram account that, in his opinion, the singer Blanco had plagiarized his music and never credited or mentioned Tha Supreme for it, pretending he did not know anything about it when asked in interviews. The Instagram post was deleted after a few days.

== Discography ==
=== Studio albums ===
List of studio albums, with chart positions and certifications
Title	Album details	Peak chart positions		Certifications
Title	Album details	ITA	SWI	Certifications
23 6451 ("Le basi")	Released: 15 November 2019; Label: Epic; Formats: CD, LP, download, streaming	1	32	FIMI: 5× Platinum
c@r@++ere s?ec!@le (“Carattere speciale”)	Released: 30 September 2022; Label: Sony Music; Formats: CD, LP, download, streaming	1	11	FIMI: 5× Platinum
Casa Gospel (with Mara Sattei)	Released: 13 December 2024; Label: Epic; Formats: CD, LP, download, streaming	2	85	FIMI: Gold
Լïიننوลցوιö Նหiνغгيаլξ (“Linguaggio Universale”)	Released: 8 January 2027; Label: Sony Music; Formats: CD, LP, download, streaming			

=== Mixtapes ===
List of mixtapes, with chart positions
Title	Album details	Peak chart positions
Title	Album details	ITA
sFaCioLaTe miXTaPe (Thasup as Yungest Moonstar)	Released: 26 July 2024 (1 am); Label: Sony Music; Formats: CD, LP, download, streaming	2

=== Singles ===
==== As lead artist ====
List of singles as lead artist, showing year released and album
Title	Year	Peak chart positions	Certifications	Album
Title	Year	ITA	Certifications	Album
"6itch"	2017	—	FIMI: Platinum	Non-album single
"5olo"	2018	36	FIMI: Gold	23 6451
"scuol4"	2018	20	FIMI: Platinum	23 6451
"oh 9od" (featuring Nayt)	2018	27	FIMI: Platinum	23 6451
"m8nstar"	2019	17	FIMI: Platinum	23 6451
"blun7 a Swishland"	2019	1	FIMI: 4× Platinum	23 6451
"0ffline" (featuring bbno$)	2020	11	FIMI: Platinum	23 6451
"Altalene" (featuring Slait, Coez and Mara Sattei)	2020	1	FIMI: 3× Platinum	Bloody Vinyl 3
"gua10" (featuring Lazza)	2020	15	FIMI: Gold	23 6451
"Warzonata" (featuring Zano)	2021	—		Non-album single
"uNa DiReZioNe giUsTa" (as Yungest Moonstar; featuring Neffa)	2021	8	FIMI: 3× Platinum	Non-album single
"bLu" (as Yungest Moonstar)	2021	—		Non-album single
"m%n"	2021	2	FIMI: Platinum	c@r@++ere s?ec!@le
"NLFP" (featuring Psicologi)	2022	32	FIMI: Gold	Trauma
"s!r!" (featuring Lazza and Sfera Ebbasta)	2022	1	FIMI: 4× Platinum	c@r@++ere s?ec!@le
"okk@pp@"	2022	9	FIMI: Gold	c@r@++ere s?ec!@le
"!ly" <(featuring Coez)	2022	5	FIMI: 2× Platinum	c@r@++ere s?ec!@le
"r()t()nda" (featuring Tiziano Ferro)	2023	4	FIMI: Platinum	c@r@++ere s?ec!@le
"Dimmi che c'è" (featuring Tedua)	2023	7	FIMI: 2× Platinum	c@r@++ere s?ec!@le
"SELEÇAO" (as Yungest Moonstar)	2023	—		Sfaciolate Mixtape
"Uragano Damn" (as Yungest Moonstar)	2023	64		Non-album single
"Posto mio" with Mara Sattei)	2024	33		Casa Gospel
Prendimi le mani" (as Yungest Moonstar)	2025	—		Non-album single

==== As featured artist ====
List of singles as featured artist, showing year released, select chart positions and album
Title	Year	Peak chart positions	Album
Title	Year	ITA	Album
Casa Free? (Warez featuring Nitro and Tha Supreme)		—	Non-album single
"Yung" (Dani Faiv featuring Tha Supreme)	2019	—	Fruit Joint + Gusto
"Yoshi" (Remix) (Machete featuring Tha Supreme, Fabri Fibra, J Balvin and Capo Plaza)	2019	1	Non-album single
"Fuori e dentro" (Gemitaiz and Madman featuring Tha Supreme)	2019	2	Scatola nera
"Supreme – L'ego" (Marracash featuring Tha Supreme and Sfera Ebbasta)	2019	1	Persona
"Calmo" (Shiva featuring Tha Supreme)	2020	1	Routine EP
"Rap Shit" (Nitro featuring Tha Supreme and Gemitaiz)	2020	10	GarbAge
"Con me" (Young Miles featuring Tha Supreme)	2020	66	Glitched Years
"Marymango" (Ghali featuring Tha Supreme)	2020	6	DNA
"Dilemme (Remix)" (Lous and the Yakuza featuring Tha Supreme and Mara Sattei)	2020	3	Non-album singles
"Spigoli" (Carl Brave featuring Mara Sattei and Tha Supreme)	2020	1	Non-album singles
"Solite pare" (Sick Luke featuring Tha Supreme and Sfera Ebbasta)	2022	1	Non-album singles
"Bubble" (Takagi & Ketra featuring Thasup and Salmo)	2022	10	Non-album singles
"Obladi oblada" (Charlie Charles featuring Ghali, Thasup e Fabri Fibra)	2023	43	Non-album singles
"La notte" (Sally Cruz featuring Thasup)	2024	95	Confessione

== Awards and nominations ==
Year	Organization	Award	Result	Ref(s)
Nickelodeon Kids' Choice Awards	2020	"blun7 a Swishland"	Favorite Song	Nominated
Nickelodeon Kids' Choice Awards	2020	23 6451	Favorite Album	Nominated
Nickelodeon Kids' Choice Awards	2020	Tha Supreme (Italian)	Global Music Star	Nominated
Nickelodeon Kids' Choice Awards	2022	"m%n"	Favorite Song	Nominated
Nickelodeon Kids' Choice Awards	2023	"s!r!"	Favorite Song	Nominated
Nickelodeon Kids' Choice Awards	2023	"Dimmi Che C'è"	Favorite Collaboration	Nominated
Nickelodeon Kids' Choice Awards	2023	Tha Supreme (Italian)	Global Music Star	Nominated
Nickelodeon Kids' Choice Awards	2023	c@ra++ere s?ec!@le	Favorite Album	Nominated
