= List of Italian comedians =

This is a list of Italian comedians sorted by last name:

- Diego Abatantuono
- Antonio Albanese
- Aldo, Giovanni & Giacomo
- Maria Beatrice Alonzi
- Lello Arena
- Giorgio Ariani
- Dario Bandiera
- Lino Banfi
- Roberto Benigni
- Enrico Beruschi
- Riccardo Billi
- Claudio Bisio
- Massimo Boldi
- Bombolo
- Franco Bracardi
- Giorgio Bracardi
- Gino Bramieri
- Enrico Brignano
- Fred Buscaglione
- Lando Buzzanca
- Jerry Calà
- Carlo Campanini
- Enzo Cannavale
- Maccio Capatonda
- Pino Caruso
- Massimo Ceccherini
- Adriano Celentano
- Athina Cenci
- Walter Chiari
- Cochi e Renato
- Paola Cortellesi
- Giobbe Covatta
- Maurizio Crozza
- Geppi Cucciari
- Gianfranco D'Angelo
- Carlo Dapporto
- Mauro Di Francesco
- Aldo Fabrizi
- Gioele Dix
- Giorgio Faletti
- Fanfulla
- Antonello Fassari
- Ficarra e Picone
- Rosario Fiorello
- Dario Fo
- Franco Franchi
- Pippo Franco
- Nino Frassica
- Margherita Fumero
- Gigi e Andrea
- Aldo Giuffrè
- Ezio Greggio
- Beppe Grillo
- Gene Gnocchi
- I Gufi
- Leo Gullotta
- Caterina Guzzanti
- Corrado Guzzanti
- Sabina Guzzanti
- Paolo Hendel
- Enzo Iacchetti
- Sabrina Impacciatore
- Ciccio Ingrassia
- Enzo Jannacci
- Katia & Valeria
- Cinzia Leone
- Lillo & Greg
- Luciana Littizzetto
- Andy Luotto
- Daniele Luttazzi
- Erminio Macario
- Nino Manfredi
- Teresa Mannino
- Simona Marchini
- Neri Marcorè
- Maurizio Mattioli
- Anna Mazzamauro
- Maurizio Micheli
- Paola Minaccioni
- Sandra Mondaini
- Enrico Montesano
- Francesco Mulé
- Tuccio Musumeci
- Alighiero Noschese
- Giorgio Panariello
- Paolo Panelli
- Francesco Paolantoni
- Ettore Petrolini
- Raffaele Pisu
- Renato Pozzetto
- Gigi Proietti
- Virginia Raffaele
- Renato Rascel
- Ric e Gian
- David Riondino
- Mario Riva
- Enzo Robutti
- Paolo Rossi
- Francesco Salvi
- Pippo Santonastaso
- Alessandro Siani
- Alberto Sordi
- Nino Taranto
- Teo Teocoli
- Nino Terzo
- Ugo Tognazzi
- Totò
- Trettré
- Massimo Troisi
- Fatima Trotta
- Bice Valori
- Carlo Verdone
- Raimondo Vianello
- Paolo Villaggio
- Checco Zalone

== See also ==
- Culture of Italy
- List of comedians
- List of Italians
