= Derby Club =

Italian musical and comedy club

Derby Club was a musical and comedy club located in Milan, Italy.

The club was founded in the late 1950s by Gianni Bongioanni as a restaurant named "Gi-Go" in which live jazz music was occasionally played. It turned into a nightclub in 1962, when thanks to the involvement of jazz musician Enrico Intra was renamed "Intra’s Derby Club" (later just "Derby Club") after the Inter Milan-A.C. Milan football derby, and started focusing on jazz music and stand-up comedy performances.

The club became a meeting place for a very diverse audience, and actively contributed to the launch of several artists' careers, including Enzo Jannacci, Cochi Ponzoni and Renato Pozzetto (a.k.a. Cochi e Renato), Paolo Villaggio, Diego Abatantuono, Claudio Bisio, Giorgio Faletti, I Gufi, Massimo Boldi, Teo Teocoli, Lino Toffolo, Paolo Rossi, Antonio Catania, Gianfranco Funari, Giobbe Covatta, Enrico Beruschi, Felice Andreasi, Francesco Salvi, Enzo Iacchetti, Walter Valdi. Among artists who performed there were also Dario Fo, Charles Trenet, Amália Rodrigues, Ornella Vanoni, Gino Paoli, Gabriella Ferri, Bruno Lauzi, Franco Califano, Quartetto Cetra. In the 1980s the club started declining, eventually closing in 1985.
