= Sanremo Music Festival 2015 =

Italian song contest (65th edition)

- Tutti cantano Sanremo

Dates and venue
- Semi-final 1: 10 February 2015
- Semi-final 2: 11 February 2015
- Semi-final 3: 12 February 2015
- Semi-final 4: 13 February 2015
- Final: 14 February 2015
- Venue: Teatro Ariston; Sanremo, Italy

Production
- Broadcaster: Radiotelevisione italiana (RAI)
- Director: Maurizio Pagnussat
- Musical director: Pinuccio Pirazzoli
- Artistic director: Carlo Conti
- Presenters: Carlo Conti and Arisa, Emma Marrone, Rocío Muñoz Morales

Big Artists section
- Number of entries: 20
- Voting system: Televotes, music journalists, popular jury, expert jury
- Winner: "Grande amore" Il Volo

Newcomers' section
- Number of entries: 8
- Voting system: Televotes, music journalists, jury
- Winner: "Ritornerò da te" Giovanni Caccamo

The Sanremo Music Festival 2015 (Italian: Festival di Sanremo 2015), officially the 65th Italian Song Festival (65º Festival della canzone italiana), was the 65th annual Sanremo Music Festival, a television song contest held at the Teatro Ariston in Sanremo, Liguria, between 10 and 14 February 2015 and broadcast by Radiotelevisione italiana (RAI). The show was presented by 2012 and 2014 winners Emma and Arisa, along with Spanish television presenter and model Rocío Muñoz Morales and artistic director Carlo Conti.

The Big Artists section included 20 established Italian artists, competing with a song each, while eight artists performed in the Newcomers' section. On 13 February 2015, Giovanni Caccamo won the Newcomers' section with "Ritornerò da te", also receiving the "Emanuele Luzzati" Award, the Critics' Award "Mia Martini", and the Press, Radio, TV & Web Award "Lucio Dalla". He also co-wrote the song "Adesso e qui (nostalgico presente)", performed by Malika Ayane, which received the Critics' Award in the Big Artists section. The "Lucio Dalla" Award in the Big Artists section was received by Nek with "Fatti avanti amore". The winner of the Big Artists category was operatic pop trio Il Volo with their entry "Grande amore". As a result, the group was eligible to represent Italy in the Eurovision Song Contest 2015, where they would finish in third place. A total of twenty prizes were awarded during the festival.

== Presenters and personnel ==
During the press conference following the end of the Sanremo Music Festival 2014, rumours emerged suggesting Carlo Conti as a possible successor of Fabio Fazio as the show's presenter. On 24 April 2014, Rai 1 director Giancarlo Leone, while presenting the TV show Si può fare!, officially confirmed Conti as the presenter of the 65th Sanremo Music Festival. On 17 June 2014, Conti himself announced he would also be the artistic director of the show.

In December 2014, following several rumours, singers Arisa and Emma, winners of the contest in 2014 with "Controvento" and in 2012 with "Non è l'inferno", respectively, were confirmed as the show's co-presenters. In January 2015, a third female co-presenter, Spanish actress Rocío Muñoz Morales, was announced by Conti, during a pre-festival press conference.

The stage scenography was designed by Riccardo Bicchini, and was created to reproduce a flower from the inside. Maurizio Pagnussat was chosen as the TV director of the programme. Carlo Conti, Ivana Sabatini, Leopoldo Siano, Emanuele Giovannini, Martino Clericetti, Max Novaresi, Riccardo Cassini and Mario D'Amico were chosen as the show's writers. As in the previous years, during their performances, competing artists were accompanied by the Sanremo Festival Orchestra, directed by a conductor chosen by each single artist. The main orchestra conductor for non-competing performances was Pinuccio Pirazzoli.

== Participants and results summary ==
Competing songs and artists, showing writers, orchestra conductor and results achieved
Big Artists section
Song	Artist(s)	Songwriter(s)	Orchestra conductor	Rank	Sanremo Music Festival Awards
"Grande amore"	Il Volo	Francesco Boccia; Ciro Esposito	Carolina Bubbico	1	Winner of the "Big Artists" section – Golden Lion; Italian entry for the Eurovision Song Contest 2015
"Fatti avanti amore"	Nek	Nek; Luca Chiaravalli; Andrea Bonomo; Luigi Fazio	Luca Chiaravalli	2	Second place in the "Big Artists" section; Press, Radio, TV & Web Award "Lucio Dalla"; Best Arrangement Award
"Adesso e qui (nostalgico presente)"	Malika Ayane	Malika Ayane; Pacifico; Giovanni Caccamo; Alessandra Flora	Daniele Parziani	3	Third place in the "Big Artists" section; Critics' Award "Mia Martini"
"Una finestra tra le stelle"	Annalisa	Francesco Silvestre	Diego Calvetti	4	
"Straordinario"	Chiara	Ermal Meta; Giovanni Pollex	Roberto Rossi	5	
"Che giorno è?"	Marco Masini	Marco Masini; Federica Camba; Daniele Coro	Roberto Rossi	6	
"Il mondo esplode"	Dear Jack	Piero Romitelli; Davide Simonetta	Pino Perris	7	
"Sogni infranti"	Gianluca Grignani	Gianluca Grignani	Adriano Pennino	8	
"Sola"	Nina Zilli	Nina Zilli	Mauro Pagani	9	
"Siamo uguali"	Lorenzo Fragola	Lorenzo Fragola; Fedez; Fausto Cogliati	Lucio Fabbri	10	
"Un attimo importante"	Alex Britti	Alex Britti	Adriano Pennino	11	
"Un vento senza nome"	Irene Grandi	Irene Grandi; Saverio Lanza	Saverio Lanza	12	
"Buona fortuna amore"	Nesli	Nesli; Brando	Umberto Iervolino	13	
"Il solo al mondo"	Bianca Atzei	Francesco Silvestre	Diego Calvetti	14	
"Oggi ti parlo così"	Moreno	Moreno; Roberto Casalino; Roberto Dagani; Alessandro Erba; Marco Zangirolami	Beppe Vessicchio	15	
"Io sono una finestra"	Grazia Di Michele & Mauro Coruzzi	Grazia Di Michele; Raffaele Petrangeli	Lucio Fabbri	16	
"Come una favola"	Raf	Raf; Saverio Grandi; Emiliano Cecere	Valeriano Chiaravalle	Eliminated	
"Vita d'inferno"	Biggio & Mandelli	Fabrizio Biggio; Francesco Mandelli; Martino Ferro	Roy Paci	Eliminated	
"Voce"	Lara Fabian	Cristiano Cremonini; Lara Fabian; Fio Zanotti	Fio Zanotti	Eliminated	
"Libera"	Anna Tatangelo	Francesco Silvestre; Enrico Palmosi	Adriano Pennino	Eliminated	
Newcomers' section
Song	Artist(s)	Songwriter(s)	Orchestra conductor	Rank	Sanremo Music Festival Awards
"Ritornerò da te"	Giovanni Caccamo	Giovanni Caccamo	Daniele Parziani	1	Winner of the Newcomers' section – Silver Lion Award; "Emanuele Luzzati" Award; Critics' Award "Mia Martini"; Press, Radio, TV & Web Award "Lucio Dalla"
"Elisa"	KuTso	Matteo Gabbianelli	Adriano Pennino	2	Second place in the Newcomers' section; Assomusica Award for Best Performance
"Qualcosa da decidere"	Enrico Nigiotti	Enrico Nigiotti	Umberto Iervolino	Semi-finalist	
"Credo"	Amara	Erika Mineo; Salvatore Mineo	Angelo Avarello	Semi-finalist	
"Io non lo so cos'è l'amore"	Rakele	Bungaro; Cesare Chiodo; Giacomo Runco	Beppe Vessicchio	Eliminated	
"Galleggiare"	Serena Brancale	Serena Brancale	Carolina Bubbico	Eliminated	
"Oltre il giardino"	Kaligola	Gabriele Rosciglione	Giorgio Rosciglione	Eliminated	Sergio Bardotti Award for Best Lyrics
"Ritornerai"	Chanty	Chantal Saroldi; Andrea Bonomo; Manuela Speroni	Beppe Vessicchio	Eliminated	

=== Other awards ===
- Best Cover Performance: Nek – "Se telefonando"
- Sanremo Music Festival Ambassador in the World: Al Bano
- Sanremo Music Festival Ambassador in the World: Romina Power
- Career Award: Pino Donaggio, for the 50th anniversary of the song "Io che non vivo" with 80 million records sold
- FIMI Platinum Award: Saint Motel – "My Type"
- City of Sanremo Award: Giorgio Panariello

== Shows ==
=== First night ===
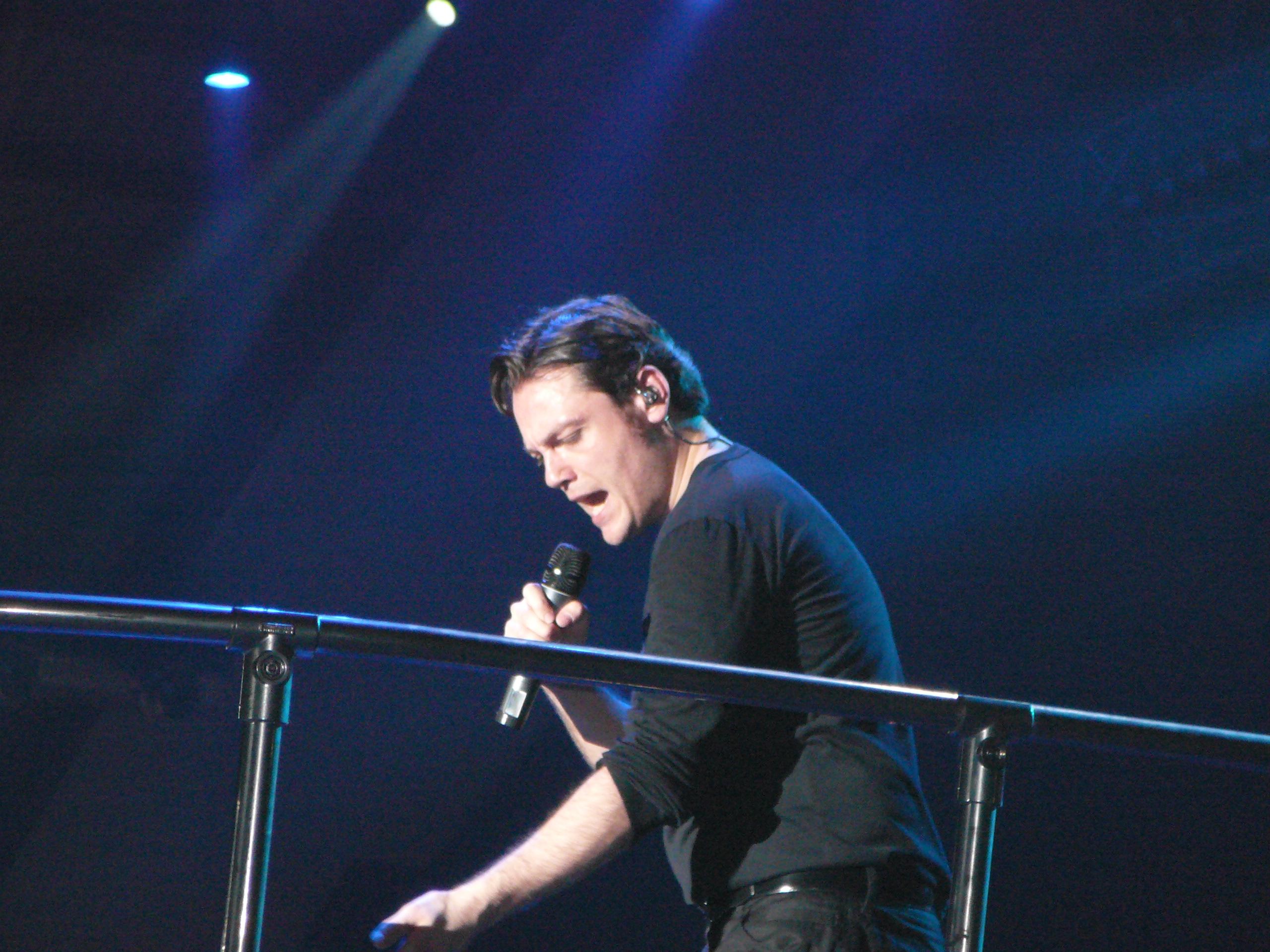
Tiziano Ferro was the first musical guest of the show.

During the first night, 10 out of 20 acts in the Big Artists section performed their competing song. Their performances were voted by the public, as well as by journalists in the press room, with equal weight. A first rank was compiled, but none of the entries was eliminated.

In the first part of the show, the Anania family, composed of a couple with 16 children, was invited to take part in the show to talk about being the most numerous family in Italy. The first musical guest of the night was Italian singer-songwriter Tiziano Ferro. He appeared on stage performing a medley of the songs "Non me lo so spiegare", "Sere nere" and "Il regalo più grande". After being briefly interviewed by Conti, he sang his single "Incanto". After Dear Jack's performance, actor Alessandro Siani was introduced by Carlo Conti. He performed a comic monologue in which he joked with Conti and the Sanremo Music Festival audience, and he talked about the economic crisis, citing politics including Matteo Salvini and Matteo Renzi. He concluded his performance with a tribute to Pino Daniele.

Later during the night, Italian singer Albano Carrisi reunited with former wife and longtime stage partner Romina Power, performing their hits "Cara terra mia", "Ci sarà" and "Felicità". Albano also performed his 1996 entry "È la mia vita". Before leaving the stage, the couple received a special award as "Ambassadors of the Sanremo Music Festival in the world". Another guest of the show was Italian doctor Fabrizio Pulvirenti, who survived the 2014 Ebola virus epidemic. He was interviewed by presenter Carlo Conti. Comedians ensemble Boiler also appeared for a sketch during the night, in which they played fake journalists. After the last competing performance, American band Imagine Dragons performed their hits "Demons" and "I Bet My Life". Comedian Francesco Cicchella imitated Canadian singer Michael Bublé, and finally, co-presenters Arisa and Emma dueted on Renato Zero's "Il carrozzone".

==== Big Artists performances during the first night ====
"Big Artists" performances, with competing songs and voting results
R/O	Artist	Song	Voting details			
R/O	Artist	Song	Journalists	Televotes	Total	Rank
1	Chiara	"Straordinario"	10.74%	9.49%	10.12%	5
2	Gianluca Grignani	"Sogni infranti"	5.37%	4.82%	5.10%	9
3	Alex Britti	"Un attimo importante"	8.68%	5.41%	7.04%	8
4	Malika Ayane	"Adesso e qui (nostalgico presente)"	17.97%	4.41%	11.19%	4
5	Dear Jack	"Il mondo esplode"	3.93%	23.05%	13.49%	3
6	Lara Fabian	"Voce"	3.10%	3.27%	3.19%	10
7	Nek	"Fatti avanti amore"	17.57%	18.08%	17.83%	1
8	Grazia Di Michele & Mauro Coruzzi	"Io sono una finestra"	9.30%	7.14%	8.22%	7
9	Annalisa	"Una finestra tra le stelle"	13.22%	14.47%	13.85%	2
10	Nesli	"Buona fortuna amore"	10.12%	9.86%	9.99%	6

=== Second night ===
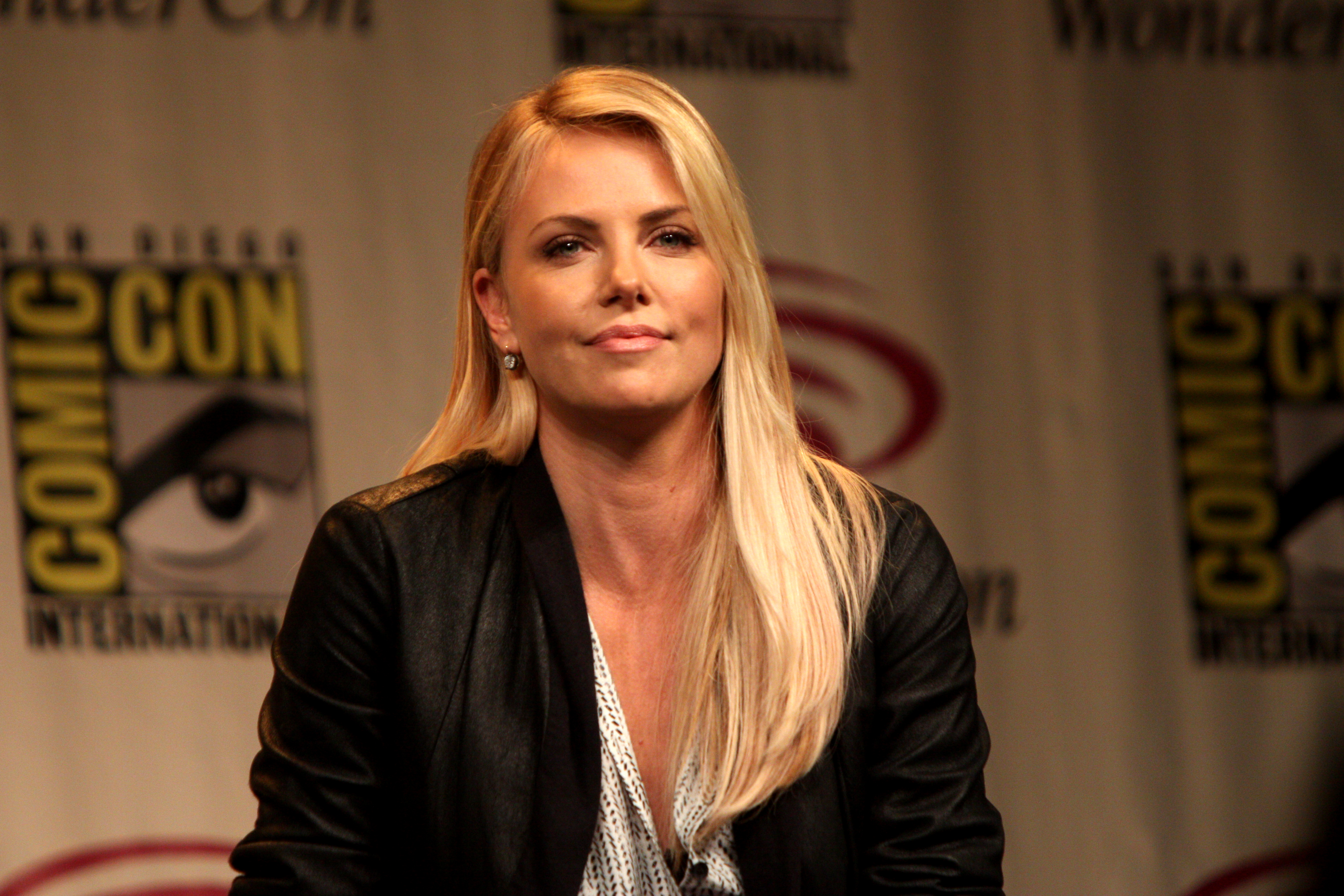
Charlize Theron was one of the main guests of the second night.

The second night of the 65th Sanremo Music Festival, held on 11 February 2015, began with the Newcomers' competition. Four acts, divided into two different challenges, performed their competing songs. For each challenge, the winning entry, determined by combining televotes with the points awarded by journalists in the press room, was admitted to the semi-final of the contest, while the remaining one was eliminated.kuTso and Enrico Nigiotti advanced to the next stage of the competition. After the Newcomers' challenges, dancing ensemble Pilobolus performed a number based on shadow games, based on the song "Empire State of Mind". Then, Conti launched the Big Artists performances. During the night, the ten competing artists which did not appear during the previous episode sang their entries, and were voted by public and journalists, resulting in a partial ranking.

Big Artists performances werte interlaced by several guest appearances. American chef Joe Bastianich appeared on stage with presenter Carlo Conti, and performed a cover version of "Quando, quando, quando" by Tony Renis. Italian singer-songwriter Biagio Antonacci later performed a medley of his hits "Se io se lei", "Dolore e forza", "Pazzo di lei" and "Sognami", as well as Pino Daniele's "Quando". South African-American actress Charlize Theron was interviewed by Carlo Conti. Shortly after, co-presenter Rocío Muñoz Morales danced Mango's "Lei verrà" as a tribute to the singer-songwriter, who died in December 2014. Comedian Angelo Pintus also performed a monologue. Pino Donaggio appeared on stage to celebrate the 50th anniversary of the song "Io che non vivo", launched during the Sanremo Music Festival 1965. He received a special award for the song. Actors Claudio Amendola and Luca Argentero promoted their film Noi e la Giulia, with Amendola also performing a fragment of the song "...E dimmi che non vuoi morire". Austrian singer Conchita Wurst presented her new single "Heroes". After interviewing former footballer Javier Zanetti, Carlo Conti introduced the last guest of the night, Marlon Roudette, who sang "When the Beat Drops Out".

==== Newcomers' performances during the second night ====
Newcomers' performance, with competing songs and voting results
R/O	Artist	Song	Voting details			
R/O	Artist	Song	Journalists	Televotes	Total	Result
Challenge #1
1	KuTso	"Elisa"	61.98%	56.19%	59.08%	Advanced
2	Kaligola	"Oltre il giardino"	38.02%	43.81%	40.92%	Eliminated
Challenge #2
3	Enrico Nigiotti	"Qualcosa da decidere"	32.74%	70.31%	51.53%	Advanced
4	Chanty	"Ritornerai"	67.26%	29.69%	48.47%	Eliminated

==== Big Artists performances during the second night ====
"Big Artists" performances, with competing songs and voting results
R/O	Artist	Song	Voting details			
R/O	Artist	Song	Journalists	Televotes	Total	Rank
1	Nina Zilli	"Sola"	13.50%	3.49%	8.49%	5
2	Marco Masini	"Che giorno è"	15.48%	11.81%	13.64%	2
3	Anna Tatangelo	"Libera"	5.16%	4.94%	5.05%	10
4	Raf	"Come una favola"	8.33%	4.81%	6.57%	6
5	Il Volo	"Grande amore"	8.73%	44.56%	26.64%	1
6	Irene Grandi	"Un vento senza nome"	16.27%	2.97%	9.62%	4
7	Biggio & Mandelli	"Vita d'inferno"	7.34%	3.38%	5.36%	9
8	Lorenzo Fragola	"Siamo uguali"	11.51%	12.51%	12.01%	3
9	Bianca Atzei	"Il solo al mondo"	6.74%	6.17%	6.46%	7
10	Moreno	"Oggi ti parlo così"	6.94%	5.37%	6.16%	8

=== Third night ===
The third night of the 65th Sanremo Music Festival started with the Newcomers' competition. Two challenges took place, to determine two of the semi-finalists. Based on public votes and on points awarded by the quality jury, Giovanni Caccamo and Amara advanced to the next stage of te competition, while Serena Brancale and Rakele were eliminated.

The rest of the night was based on covers performed by the acts of the Big Artists section. Their performances were divided into five different groups composed of four acts each. Public votes and a jury composed of journalists determined the winning entry for each group. An additional voting session, based on the same rules, later took place among the five winning entries, to determine the winner of the Cover Award. Nek's performance of "Se telefonando", originally by Mina. Votes received during the night did not contribute to determine the winner of the main competition.

==== Newcomers' performances during the third night ====
Newcomers' performances, with competing songs and voting results
R/O	Artist	Song	Voting details			
R/O	Artist	Song	Journalists	Televotes	Total	Result
Challenge #3
1	Giovanni Caccamo	"Ritornerò da te"	61.90%	73.79%	67.85%	Advanced
2	Serena Brancale	"Galleggiare"	38.10%	26,21%	32.16%	Eliminated
Challenge #4
1	Amara	"Credo"	58.56%	57.07%	57.82%	Advanced
2	Rakele	"Io non lo so cos'è l'amore"	41.44%	42.93%	42.18%	Eliminated

==== Big Artists performances during the third night ====
"Big Artists" performances, with competing song and voting results
R/O	Artist	Song, original artist, year, and writer(s)	Voting details				
R/O	Artist	Song, original artist, year, and writer(s)	Journalists	Televotes	Total	Rank	Result
Group #1
1	Raf	"Rose rosse" – Massimo Ranieri (1969) (Giancarlo Bigazzi, Federico Polito)	7.73%	14,29%	11.01%	4	Eliminated
2	Irene Grandi	"Se perdo te" – Patty Pravo (1968) (Paul Korda, Sergio Bardotti)	31.44%	14.18%	22.81%	3	Eliminated
3	Moreno	"Una carezza in un pugno" – Adriano Celentano (1968) (Luciano Beretta, Miki Del Prete, Ferdinando De Luca, Gino Santercole)	37.63%	42.00%	39.82%	1	Advanced
4	Anna Tatangelo	"Dio, come ti amo" – Domenico Modugno (1966) (Domenico Modugno)	23.20%	29.53%	26.37%	2	Eliminated
Group #2
5	Biggio & Mandelli	"E la vita, la vita" – Cochi e Renato (1974) (Enzo Jannacci, Renato Pozzetto)	11.06%	6,59%	8,83%	4	Eliminated
6	Chiara	"Il volto della vita" – Caterina Caselli (1968) (David McWilliams, Mogol, Daiano)	26.99%	26.82%	26.91%	2	Eliminated
7	Nesli	"Mare mare" – Luca Carboni (1982) (Luca Carboni, Mauro Malavasi)	13.72%	12.82%	13.27%	3	Eliminated
8	Nek	"Se telefonando" – Mina (1966) (Maurizio Costanzo, Ennio Morricone, Gaetano De Chiara)	48.23%	53.77%	50.99%	1	Advanced
Group #3
9	Dear Jack	"Io che amo solo te" – Sergio Endrigo (1962) (Sergio Endrigo)	20.54%	59.87%	40.21%	1	Advanced
10	Grazia Di Michele & Platinette	"Alghero" – Giuni Russo (1986) (Giuni Russo, Maria Antonietta Sisini)	35.71%	10.25%	22.98%	2	Eliminated
11	Bianca Atzei	"Ciao amore ciao" – Luigi Tenco (1967) (Luigi Tenco)	15.63%	16.52%	16.08%	4	Eliminated
12	Alex Britti	"Io mi fermo qui" – Dik Dik (1970) (Luigi Albertelli, Enrico Riccardi)	28.12%	13.36%	20.74%	3	Eliminated
Group #4
13	Lorenzo Fragola	"Una città per cantare" – Ron (1980) (Danny O'Keefe, Lucio Dalla)	22.81%	14.21%	18.51%	3	Eliminated
14	Il Volo	"Ancora" – Eduardo De Crescenzo (1981) (Franco Migliacci, Claudio Mattone)	20.18%	62.96%	41.57%	1	Advanced
15	Annalisa	"Ti sento" – Matia Bazar (1985) (Carlo Marrale, Sergio Cossu, Salvatore Stellita)	36.40%	15.81%	26.11%	2	Eliminated
16	Lara Fabian	"Sto male" – Ornella Vanoni (1973) (Serge Lama, Giorgio Calabrese)	20.61%	7.02%	13.82%	4	Eliminated
Group #5
17	Gianluca Grignani	"Vedrai vedrai" – Luigi Tenco (1965) (Luigi Tenco)	12.82%	33.95%	23.39%	3	Eliminated
18	Nina Zilli	"Se bruciasse la città" – Massimo Ranieri (1969) (Giancarlo Bigazzi, Federico Polito, Gaetano Savio)	22.65%	13.49%	18.07%	4	Eliminated
19	Malika Ayane	"Vivere" – Vasco Rossi (1993) (Vasco Rossi, Massimo Riva, Tullio Ferro)	37.61%	14.88%	26.25%	2	Eliminated
20	Marco Masini	"Sarà per te" – Francesco Nuti (1968) (Riccardo Mariotti)	26.92%	37.68%	32.30%	1	Advanced

Final voting session for the "Cover Award" – Big Artists section
Artist	Song	Voting details			
Artist	Song	Journalists	Televotes	Total	Result
Moreno	"Una carezza in un pugno"	19.64%	6.39%	13.02%	Fourth place
Nek	"Se telefonando"	37.94%	16.72%	27.33%	Winner
Dear Jack	"Io che amo solo te"	6.70%	16.56%	11.63%	Fifth place
Il Volo	"Ancora"	8.93%	44.64%	26.79%	Second place
Marco Masini	"Sarà per te"	26.79%	15.69%	21.24%	Third place

=== Fourth night ===
==== Newcomers' performances during the fourth night ====
Newcomers' performances, with competing songs and voting results
R/O	Artist	Song	Voting details				
R/O	Artist	Song	Popular jury	Experts jury^{[A]}	Televotes	Total	Result
Semi-final #1
1	Amara	"Credo"	43.85%	25.00%	53.35%	42.00%	Eliminated
2	KuTso	"Elisa"	56.15%	75.00%	46.65%	58.00%	Advanced
Semi-final #2
1	Enrico Nigiotti	"Qualcosa da decidere"	46.00%	62.50%	37.83%	47.68%	Eliminated
2	Giovanni Caccamo	"Ritornerò da te"	54.00%	37.50%	62.17%	52.32%	Advanced
Final
1	KuTso	"Elisa"	34.20%	75.00%	27.83%	43.89%	Second place
2	Giovanni Caccamo	"Ritornerò da te"	65.80%	25.00%	72.17%	56.11%	Winner

==== Big Artists performances during the fourth night ====
"Big Artists" performances, with competing songs and voting results
R/O	Artist	Song	Voting details						
R/O	Artist	Song	Popular jury	Experts jury^{[A]}	Televotes (4th night)	Televotes (1st–2nd night)	Total	Rank	Result
1	Annalisa	"Una finestra tra le stelle"	7.6333%	6.8750%	7.0063%	6.5061%	6.8305%	4	Advanced
2	Nesli	"Buona fortuna amore"	2.9000%	3.1250%	3.5852%	4.7048%	3.9732%	11	Advanced
3	Irene Grandi	"Un vento senza nome"	5.5667%	4.3750%	1.5400%	4.9634%	4.2809%	10	Advanced
4	Nek	"Fatti avanti amore"	9.3333%	11.2500%	8.0217%	8.3829%	8.8833%	2	Advanced
5	Bianca Atzei	"Il solo al mondo"	3.3667%	0.0000%	3.3890%	3.4122%	2.8889%	16	Advanced
6	Biggio & Mandelli	"Vita d'inferno"	2.6833%	4.3750%	1.8036%	2.7998%	2.8194%	18	Eliminated
7	Moreno	"Oggi ti parlo così"	2.8500%	3.1250%	3.4345%	3.2451%	3.2057%	14	Advanced
8	Lara Fabian	"Voce"	3.3833%	0.6250%	1.6141%	1.4978%	1.6730%	20	Eliminated
9	Grazia De Michele & Mauro Coruzzi	"Io sono una finestra"	3.7667%	5.0000%	2.8384%	3.8895%	3.8274%	12	Advanced
10	Lorenzo Fragola	"Siamo uguali"	4.3833%	1.8750%	5.2120%	6.3647%	5.1635%	7	Advanced
11	Anna Tatangelo	"Libera"	3.3833%	1.8750%	3.1625%	2.6694%	2.7560%	19	Eliminated
12	Il Volo	"Grande amore"	11.3333%	6.2500%	33.3886%	14.4466%	16.5385%	1	Advanced
13	Gianluca Grignani	"Sogni infranti"	2.8000%	6.2500%	2.7399%	2.4029%	3.1069%	15	Advanced
14	Malika Ayane	"Adesso e qui (nostalgico presente)"	7.5667%	18.1250%	1.4499%	5.3991%	6.8433%	3	Advanced
15	Dear Jack	"Il mondo esplode"	2.9333%	0.6250%	8.6078%	6.1668%	5.3387%	6	Advanced
16	Marco Masini	"Che giorno è"	5.1500%	4.3750%	4.5434%	7.1851%	5.9300%	5	Advanced
17	Nina Zilli	"Sola"	5.8833%	8.1250%	1.1864%	4.3991%	4.5381%	9	Advanced
18	Alex Britti	"Un attimo importante"	4.6167%	5.6250%	1.1426%	3.3458%	3.4377%	13	Advanced
19	Raf	"Come una favola"	3.8667%	1.8750%	1.4844%	3.4447%	2.8805%	17	Eliminated
20	Chiara	"Straordinario"	6.6000%	6.2500%	3.8496%	4.7743%	5.0846%	8	Advanced

=== Fifth night ===
==== Big Artists final – first round ====
"Big Artists" performances, with competing songs and voting results
R/O	Artist	Song	Voting details					
R/O	Artist	Song	Popular jury	Experts jury^{[A]}	Televotes	Total	Rank	Result
1	Marco Masini	"Che giorno è"	6.0000%	3.7500%	5.9727%	5.3141%	6	Eliminated
2	Nina Zilli	"Sola"	7.3500%	5.6250%	1.8590%	4.6361%	9	Eliminated
3	Chiara	"Straordinario"	8.5000%	4.3750%	6.2297%	6.3544%	5	Eliminated
4	Dear Jack	"Il mondo esplode"	3.0000%	0.0000%	10.4184%	5.0674%	7	Eliminated
5	Malika Ayane	"Adesso e qui (nostalgico presente)"	9.4333%	26.2500%	2.5585%	11.7284%	3	Advanced
6	Nek	"Fatti avanti amore"	11.9167%	20.0000%	9.6114%	13.4195%	2	Advanced
7	Il Volo	"Grande amore"	13.3833%	8.7500%	38.7337%	22,1335%	1	Advanced
8	Annalisa	"Una finestra tra le stelle"	8.6500%	4.3750%	6.2283%	6.3988%	4	Eliminated
9	Alex Britti	"Un attimo importante"	4.8500%	5.0000%	1.1429%	3.4122%	11	Eliminated
10	Irene Grandi	"Un vento senza nome"	6.0667%	2.5000%	1.2184%	3.0574%	12	Eliminated
11	Lorenzo Fragola	"Siamo uguali"	4.8333%	2.5000%	6.0519%	4.6208%	10	Eliminated
12	Bianca Atzei	"Il solo al mondo"	3.9000%	0.6250%	2.2561%	2.2600%	14	Eliminated
13	Moreno	"Oggi ti parlo così"	2.6000%	1.8750%	2.0288%	2.1540%	15	Eliminated
14	Gianluca Grignani	"Sogni infranti"	2.8667%	11.2500%	1.6311%	4.8875	8	Eliminated
15	Grazia Di Michele & Mauro Coruzzi	"Io sono una finestra"	3.6333%	0.6250%	1.5189%	1.8851%	16	Eliminated
16	Nesli	"Buona fortuna amore"	3.0167%	2.5000%	2.5401%	2.6710%	13	Eliminated

==== Big Artists final – second round ====
"Big Artists" performances, with competing songs and voting results
R/O	Artist	Song	Voting details				
R/O	Artist	Song	Popular jury	Experts jury^{[A]}	Televotes	Total	Result
1	Il Volo	"Grande amore"	32.3333%	22.9167%	56.1878%	39.05%	Winner
2	Nek	"Fatti avanti amore"	35.9444%	37.5000%	33.3757%	35.38%	Second place
3	Malika Ayane	"Adesso e qui (nostalgico presente)"	31.7222%	39.5833%	10.4365%	25.57%	Third place

== Other awards ==
=== Critics' Award "Mia Martini" – Big Artists section ===
Points received by the "Big Artists" for the Critics Award
Artist	Song	Points	Result
Malika Ayane	"Adesso e qui (nostalgico presente)"	36	Winner
Grazia Di Michele & Mauro Coruzzi	"Io sono una finestra"	19	Second place
Nek	"Fatti avanti amore"	10	Third place

=== Critics' Award "Mia Martini" – Newcomers' section ===
Points received by the "Newcomers" for the Critics Award
Artist	Song	Points	Result
Giovanni Caccamo	"Ritornerò da te"	45	Winner
Amara	"Credo"	24	Second place
KuTso	"Elisa"	15	Third place
Serena Brancale	"Galleggiare"	9	Fourth place
Chanty	"Ritornerai"	6	Fifth place
Enrico Nigiotti	"Qualcosa da decidere"	4	Sixth place
Rakele	"Io non lo so cos'è l'amore"	3	Seventh place
Kaligola	"Oltre il giardino"	2	Eighth place

=== Press, Radio, TV & Web Award "Lucio Dalla" – Big Artists section ===
Points received by the "Big Artists" for the Press, Radio, TV & Web Award
Artist	Song	Points	Result
Nek	"Fatti avanti amore"	45	Winner
Malika Ayane	"Adesso e qui (nostalgico presente)"	20	Second place
Marco Masini	"Che giorno è"	13	Third place
Annalisa	"Una finestra tra le stelle"	11	Fourth place
Il Volo	"Grande amore"	10	Fifth place
Nina Zilli	"Sola"	9	Sixth place
Lorenzo Fragola	"Siamo uguali"	5	Seventh place
Grazia Di Michele & Mauro Coruzzi	"Io sono una finestra"	5	Seventh place

=== Press, Radio, TV & Web Award "Lucio Dalla" – Newcomers' section ===
Points received by the "Newcomers" for the Press, Radio, TV & Web Award
Artist	Song	Points	Result
Giovanni Caccamo	"Ritornerò da te"	42	Winner
Amara	"Credo"	35	Second place
KuTso	"Elisa"	23	Third place
Enrico Nigiotti	"Qualcosa da decidere"	10	Fourth place
Rakele	"Io non lo so cos'è l'amore"	9	Fifth place
Serena Brancale	"Galleggiare"	9	Fifth place
Chanty	"Ritornerai"	7	Seventh place
Kaligola	"Oltre il giardino"	2	Eighth place

== Ratings ==
Episode	Date	Viewers	Share
Night 1	10 February 2015	11,767,000	49.37%
Night 2	11 February 2015	10,091,000	41.67%
Night 3	12 February 2015	10,586,000	49.51%
Night 4	13 February 2015	9,857,000	47.82%
Night 5	14 February 2015	11,843,000	54.21%

== Discography ==
=== Singles ===
List of single releases of songs competing in the 65th Sanremo Music Festival, with peak chart positions and certifications
Title	Artist	Peak chart positions				Certifications
Title	Artist	ITA Top Digital	ITA Airplay	ITA Domestic Airplay	SWI	Certifications
"Grande amore"	Il Volo	1	—	10	21	FIMI: Platinum
"Fatti avanti amore"	Nek	3	2	1	39	FIMI: Platinum
"Adesso e qui (nostalgico presente)"	Malika Ayane	9	6	4	—	FIMI: Gold
"Una finestra tra le stelle"	Annalisa	5	16	8	—	FIMI: Platinum
"Straordinario"	Chiara	7	13	5	—	FIMI: Platinum
"Che giorno è"	Marco Masini	20	—	13	—	
"Il mondo esplode"	Dear Jack	—	—	—	—	
"Sogni infranti"	Gianluca Grignani	—	14	6	—	
"Sola"	Nina Zilli	—	—	—	—	
"Siamo uguali"	Lorenzo Fragola	8	—	16	—	FIMI: Platinum
"Un attimo importante"	Alex Britti	—	—	14	—	
"Un vento senza nome"	Irene Grandi	—	—	11	—	
"Buona fortuna amore"	Nesli	—	—	—	—	
"Il solo al mondo"	Bianca Atzei	—	—	—	—	
"Oggi ti parlo così"	Moreno	—	—	—	—	
"Io sono una finestra"	Grazia Di Michele & Mauro Coruzzi	—	—	—	—	
"Come una favola"	Raf	—	—	12	—	
"Libera"	Anna Tatangelo	—	—	—	—	
"Voce"	Lara Fabian	—	—	—	—	
"Vita d'inferno"	Biggio e Mandelli	—	—	—	—	
"Ritornerò da te"	Giovanni Caccamo	—	—	19	—	
"Elisa"	KuTso	—	—	—	—	
"Qualcosa da decidere"	Enrico Nigiotti	—	—	—	—	
"Credo"	Amara	—	—	—	—	
"Io non lo so cos'è l'amore"	Rakele	—	—	—	—	
"Galleggiare"	Serena Brancale	—	—	—	—	
"Oltre il giardino"	Kaligola	—	—	—	—	
"Ritornerai"	Chanty	—	—	—	—	

=== Albums ===
==== Solo albums by performing artists ====
Artist	Album	Italy (Best chart position)	Italy (FIMI certifications)
Il Volo	Sanremo Grande Amore	1	2× Platinum
Lorenzo Fragola	1995	1	Gold
Dear Jack	Domani è un altro film (seconda parte)	2	Platinum
Nek	Prima di Parlare	3	Gold
Nesli	Andrà tutto bene	6	-
Annalisa	Splende	7	-
Raf	Sono io	7	-
Marco Masini	Cronologia	8	-
Malika Ayane	Naïf	9	-
Nina Zilli	Frasi & fumo	15	-
Bianca Atzei	Bianco e nero	15	-
Chiara	Un giorno di sole straordinario	16	-
Anna Tatangelo	Libera	19	-
Irene Grandi	Un vento senza nome	25	-
Moreno	Incredibile - Sanremo Edition	20	-
Amara	Donna Libera	20	-
Giovanni Caccamo	Qui per te	29	-
Gianluca Grignani	A volte esagero (Sanremo edition)	30	-
Lara Fabian	Essential	49	-
Rakele	Il Diavolo è Gentile	75	-
Kutso	Musica per Persone Sensibili	77	-

==== Compilation albums ====
Title	Details	Peak chart positions		Certifications
Title	Details	ITA	SWI	Certifications
Super Sanremo 2015	Official compilation of the show; Released: 12 February 2015; Label: RCA Records; Formats: 2× CD, download	1	2	FIMI: Platinum
Area Sanremo 2015	Includes songs competing in the Area Sanremo selection contest; Released: 11 February 2015; Label: ApM Progetto Musica; Formats: download	—	—	

== See also ==
- Italy in the Eurovision Song Contest 2015

== Notes ==
- A The jury voting during the final for the Newcomers' section and for the Big Artists section was composed of Claudio Cecchetto, Camila Raznovich, Carlo Massarini, Andrea Mirò, Paolo Beldì, Giovanni Veronesi, Marino Bartoletti and Massimo Bernardini.
