= Ho capito che ti amo =

1964 song written by Luigi Tenco

Song by Luigi Tenco

from the album Luigi Tenco
- Published: 1965
- Composer: Ezio Leoni
- Lyricist: Luigi Tenco

Cover of Luigi Tenco 1964 single "Ho capito che ti amo" / "Io lo so già" on Jolly Records

"Ho capito che ti amo" is an Italian language song written by singer-songwriter Luigi Tenco, with music arranged by Ezio Leoni, and released on the Italian record label Jolly in September 1964 as Side A of a 45 rpm side B being "Io lo so già".

"Ho capito che ti amo" meaning 'I realized that I love you' also appeared on Luigi Tenco's self-titled 1965 album Luigi Tenco.

== Versions ==
The song was a single for Italian pop singer Wilma Goich on the Italian record label Dischi Ricordi with side B being "Era troppo bello".

Other versions include those by The Marino Marini Quartet, Joe Diverio, Nicola di Bari and Emilio Pericoli. It was translated into many other languages.

In 2006, the song was part of the soundtrack of Le héros de la famille a film directed by Thierry Klifa. The song was interpreted by Catherine Deneuve.

== Charts ==
Chart (1965)	Peak position
Argentina (CAPIF)	1
