= Jolly (record company) =

- Founded: 1958
- Founder: Walter Guertler
- Distributor: Self-distributed
- Genre: Various
- Country of origin: Italy

Jolly is an Italian record company founded in 1958 by Walter Guertler.

From 1958 to 1970, Jolly published records of most of the famous Italian singers as Dalida, Adriano Celentano, Enzo Jannacci, Fausto Leali, Nicola Di Bari, Luigi Tenco, Ennio Morricone, Tony Dallara, Franco Battiato, Cochi e Renato, and Gabriella Ferri, to mention few.

Jolly was the first Italian record company to publish an economic line of products (Joker), and one of the first ones to acquire the rights of distribution in Italy of foreign brands like Disques Vogue (Petula Clark, Françoise Hardy...), Mercury Records and Atlantic Records.
