= Primavera Sound 2024 =

Music festival in Barcelona, Spain

- Genre: Indie rock; electronic; hip hop
- Dates: 30 May 2024 – 1 June 2024
- Locations: Barcelona (Catalonia, Spain)
- Coordinates: 41°24′40.75″N 2°13′28.57″E
- Founders: Pablo Soler
- Previous event: Primavera Sound 2023
- Next event: Primavera Sound 2025
- Attendance: 268,000
- Capacity: 75,000
- Website: primaverasound.com

The Primavera Sound 2024 music festival took place from 30 May to 1 June at the Parc del Fòrum in Barcelona, Spain. The line-up was headlined by Pulp, Vampire Weekend and Justice on Thursday, Lana Del Rey, The National and Disclosure on Friday and SZA, PJ Harvey, Mitski and Charli XCX on Saturday.

It was the 22nd edition of the festival. On Wednesday, 29 May, Phoenix headlined the free "Jornada Inaugural" opening day concert on the Amazon Music stage at the Parc del Fòrum. Parc del Fòrum also hosted a "Brunch on the Beach" event on Sunday, 2 June, featuring DJ sets from performers including ANOTR and The Blessed Madonna. Primavera a la Ciutat continued to be held in smaller local venues throughout the city of Barcelona, featuring exclusive performances from groups such as The Chameleons and The Mountain Goats, as well as an intimate performance by The National in the 2,000-capacity Razzmatazz club.

Steve Albini, who performed at every Primavera Sound since 2008 with his band Shellac, died weeks before the festival. A stage was renamed after him in his honor.

The festival sold 268,000 tickets, an improvement from 2023, with over 130,000 unique visitors from 134 different countries. 59% of attendees came from overseas, and the United States, United Kingdom and Italy were the most represented foreign countries. Amazon Music livestreamed performances from six stages.

== Background ==
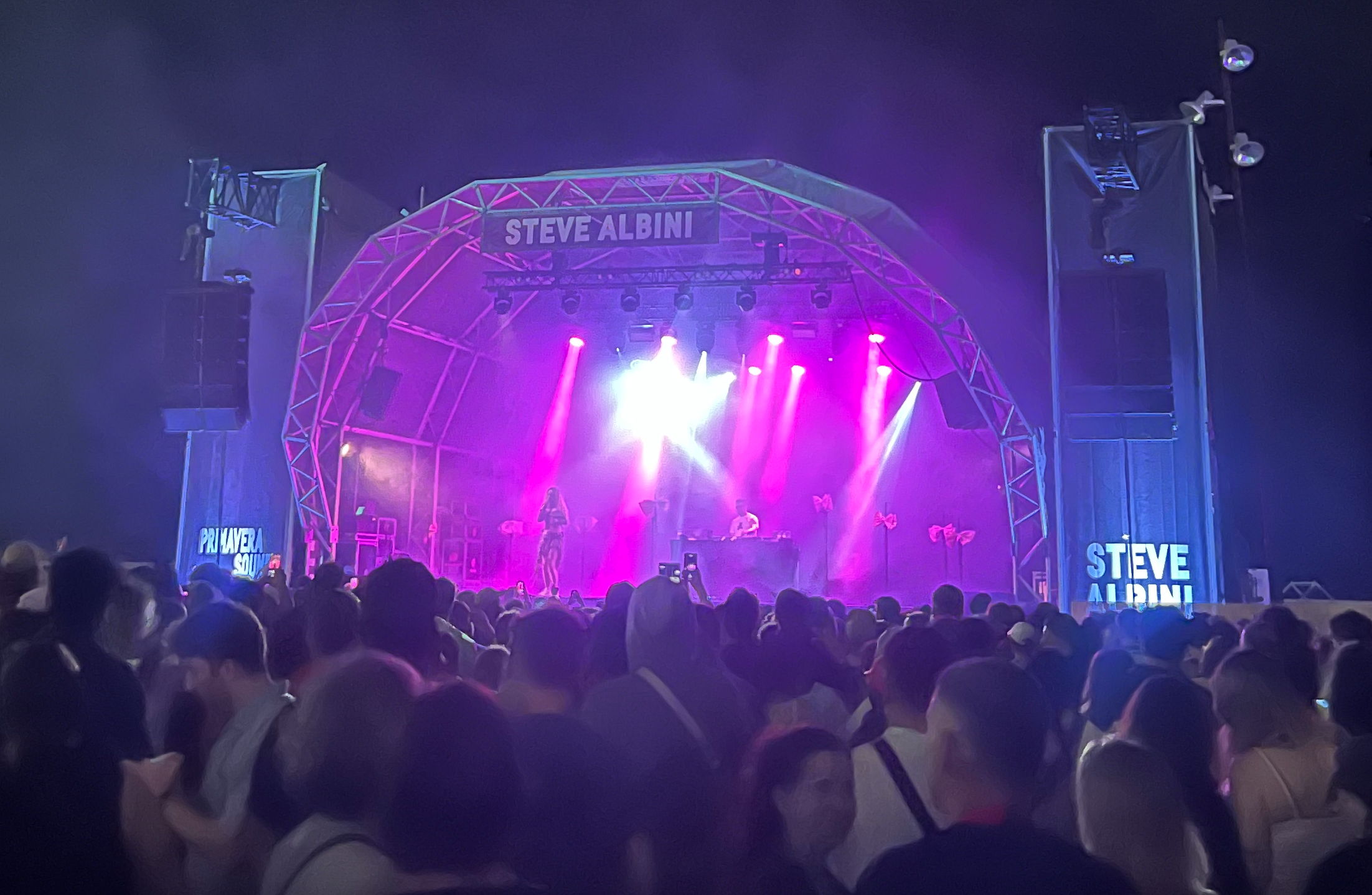
The newly-renamed Steve Albini stage at Primavera Sound 2024

The line-up for the 2024 edition of Primavera Sound was released on 21 November 2023. It was advertised as showing "love for its own history", using a retro font that recalled a 1994 poster where the words "Primavera Sound" were first used to promote a series of concerts at the venue KGB in Barcelona. The initial line-up featured 42% female artists, 42% male artists and 15% mixed-gender artists, continuing Primavera Sound's mission of being the first major festival in the world to achieve a gender-balanced lineup under their tagline "The New Normal".

On 24 April 2024, Kim Petras cancelled her appearance at Primavera Sound, along with all other summer performances, due to a medical advisory.

Steve Albini, who performed at 15 editions of the festival with his band Shellac, including every edition since 2006 except for 2007, died of a heart attack on 7 May 2024. Shellac were scheduled to perform for a 16th time in 2024. In a statement, the festival said: "What are we going to do without you, Steve? After having welcomed them at 15 editions of the festival, it is impossible for us to imagine a Primavera Sound without him, because no band explains us better than Shellac."

On 14 May 2024, the festival announced that headliner FKA Twigs, who had previously cancelled her scheduled performance in 2023, cancelled again and would have her set postponed to 2025. The seafront stage for heavy music where Shellac were scheduled to play was renamed the Steve Albini stage, and it was announced that a listening party for the band's new album To All Trains would be held during Shellac's scheduled time slot, which Stereogum noted will "function as a kind of wake for Albini's fans". Bands such as Scowl, Gel and Brutus were assigned to the newly christened Albini stage.

The final wave of artist additions included Legowelt, Mabel, Princess Superstar and Snow Strippers. On 24 May, ML Buch replaced Julie Byrne, who dropped off the lineup.

== Festival ==
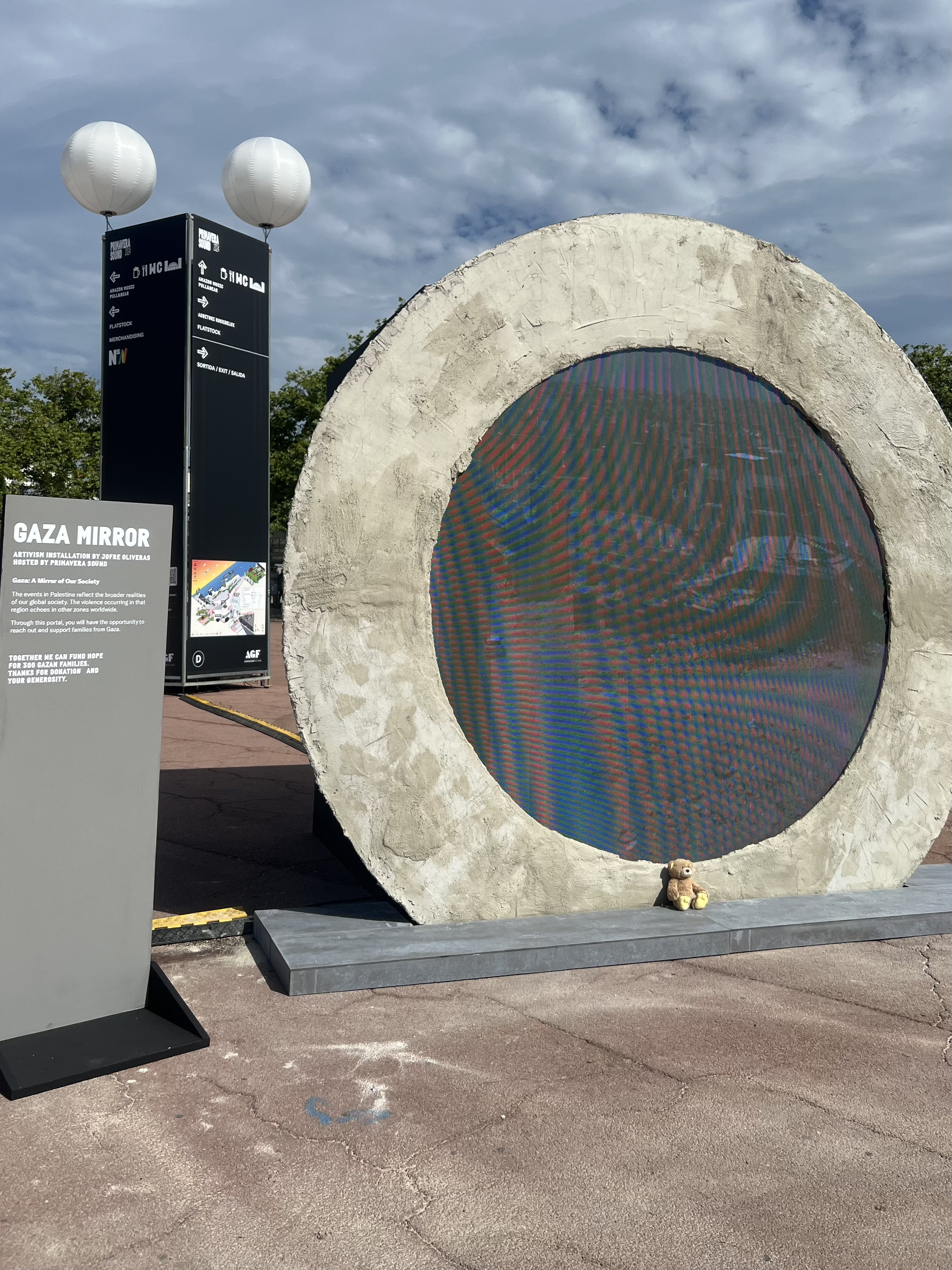
Gaza Mirror installation

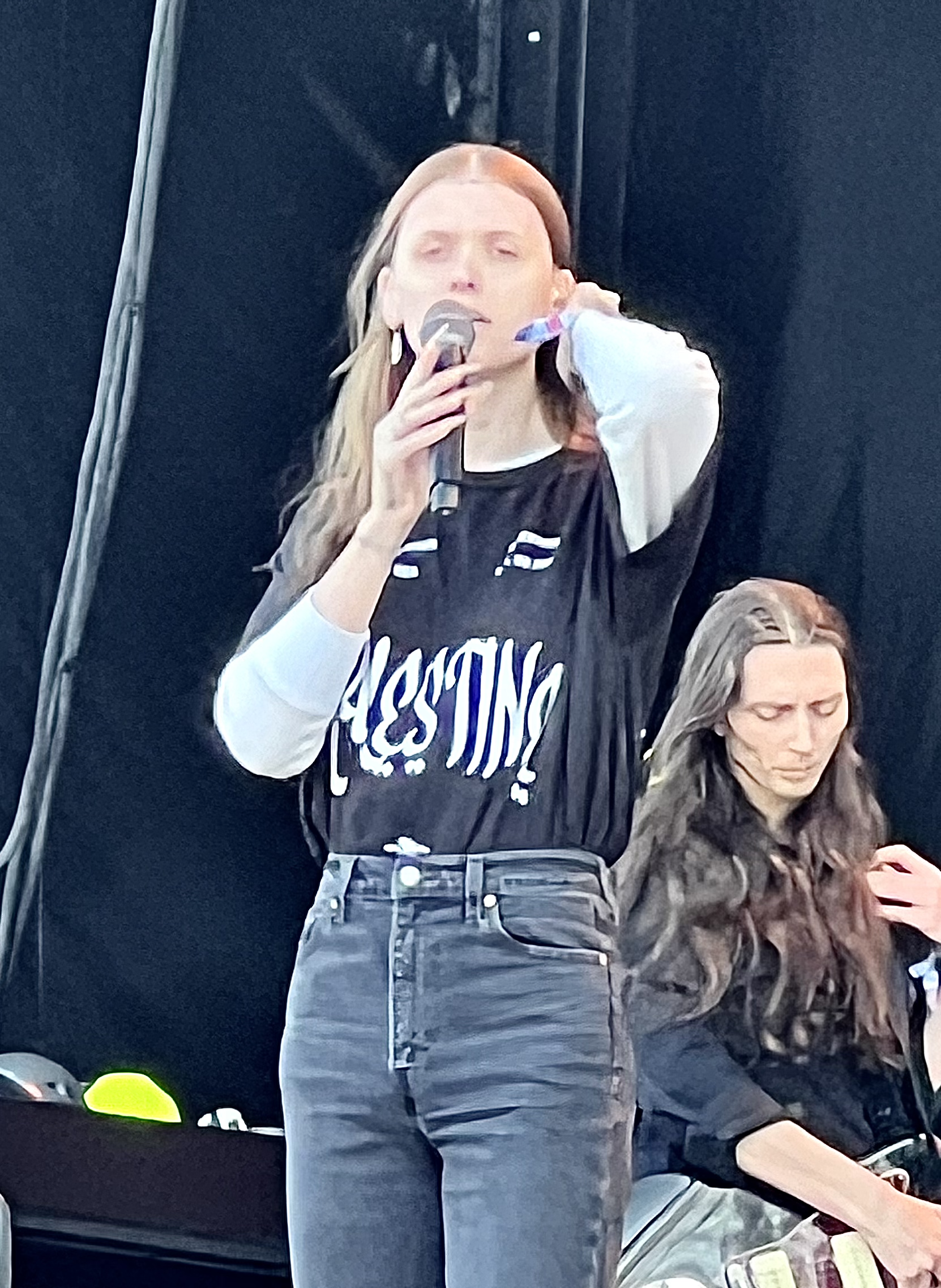
Ethel Cain performing with Palestine shirt

On 29 May 2024, the festival held its "Jornada Inaugural" opening day event at the Amazon Music stage in Parc del Fòrum, which was headlined by Phoenix. The band brought Ezra Koenig of Vampire Weekend to perform the final three songs together, including their collaboration "Tonight", to culminate a performance that was attended by 29,000 people.

During Pulp's headlining performance on 30 May, frontman Jarvis Cocker dedicated "Something Changed" to late bassist Steve Mackey and Steve Albini. Cocker also told the audience that Donald Trump was found guilty on 34 felony counts, which was breaking news hours earlier. Pulp performed a surprise second encore for "Razzmatazz", in honor of the nightclub in Barcelona named after the song.

Lana Del Rey's headlining set on 31 May began half an hour late. Far Out reported that Del Rey's fans began lining up at the festival entrance in the morning even though doors did not open until 3:45 p.m. Her performance received negative reviews from publications including Rolling Stone, who called it "flat" and "disconnected", and NME, who noted she was "marked by an uneasiness in her energy, each move she makes seemingly apprehensive and uncertain." Disclosure, who closed out the main stages on Friday, played their first live set since 2016.

A heavy rainstorm began on 1 June during PJ Harvey's headlining slot, who dedicated "The Desperate Kingdom of Love" to Steve Albini (the producer behind her album Rid of Me) and performed "Black Hearted Love" from A Woman a Man Walked By, her collaborative album with John Parish, for the first time in 15 years and the second time ever. The storm culminated in lightning during Mitski's set after. 070 Shake was cut off in the middle of performing for going over her scheduled set time with Harvey waiting to perform after her on the main stages. Charli XCX headlined at the Amazon Music stage days before the release of her sixth album Brat, debuting the songs "Everything is Romantic" and "365" live.

At the entrance to the festival grounds, an art installation titled the "Gaza Mirror" by Jofre Oliveras was displayed. It referenced the New York–Dublin Portal to connect Gaza and Barcelona, showing images of ruins in Gaza from the Gaza war and also mirroring the current destruction in Gaza onto iconic Barcelona landmarks. During their festival performances, several artists including Ethel Cain, Mannequin Pussy and Lankum expressed support for Palestine.

== Line-up ==
Headline performers are listed in boldface. Artists listed from latest to earliest set times.

=== Estrella Damm ===
Thursday, 30 May 2024	Friday, 31 May 2024	Saturday, 1 June 2024
**Justice**; **Vampire Weekend**; Freddie Gibbs & Madlib; Mujeres	**Disclosure**; **Lana Del Rey**; Omar Apollo; Ferran Palau	Róisín Murphy; **Mitski**; 070 Shake; The Lemon Twigs

=== Santander ===
Thursday, 30 May 2024	Friday, 31 May 2024	Saturday, 1 June 2024
**Pulp**; Amyl and the Sniffers; Derby Motoreta's Burrito Kachimba	**The National**; Troye Sivan; Ethel Cain	**SZA**; **PJ Harvey**; Royel Otis

=== Amazon Music ===
Thursday, 30 May 2024	Friday, 31 May 2024	Saturday, 1 June 2024
Peggy Gou; Deftones; Amaarae; Dillom; Renaldo & Clara	Arca; Rels B; Clipse; Yo La Tengo; Silica Gel	**Charli XCX**; Romy; Dorian Electra; Él Mató a un Policía Motorizado; Water from Your Eyes

=== Pull&Bear ===
Thursday, 30 May 2024	Friday, 31 May 2024	Saturday, 1 June 2024
A. G. Cook; Roosevelt; L'Impératrice; Roc Marciano; Balming Tiger; Maria Hein	Sega Bodega; Mount Kimbie; Mabel; Faye Webster; Guillem Gisbert; Aiko el Grupo	DJ Playero; YOVNGCHIMI; Bikini Kill; Liberato; Militarie Gun; Merina Gris

=== Cupra ===
Thursday, 30 May 2024	Friday, 31 May 2024	Saturday, 1 June 2024
Herrensauna; Sofia Kourtesis; Beth Gibbons; Blonde Redhead; Arab Strap; Cómo Vivir en el Campo	TraTraTrax; Barry Can't Swim; Jai Paul; BadBadNotGood; The Last Dinner Party; Rita Vian	Teki Latex; Atarashii Gakko!; American Football; La Zowi; Lisabö; Sophia Chablau e Uma Enorme Perda de Tempo

=== Plenitude ===
Thursday, 30 May 2024	Friday, 31 May 2024	Saturday, 1 June 2024
MJ Nebreda; The Armed; Yeule; Billy Woods; Mannequin Pussy; Voxtrot; Nieve Ella	Lanark Artefax; Mushkaa; Tirzah; Obongjayar; Dogstar; Nusar3000; Lisasinson	Legowelt; Model/Actriz; Mandy, Indiana; Eartheater; Crumb; Slow Pulp; Tercer Sol

=== Steve Albini ===
Thursday, 30 May 2024	Friday, 31 May 2024	Saturday, 1 June 2024
Wiegedood; Lolahol; Duster; HTRK; Shellac listening party; Viuda	HiTech; Brutus; Hannah Diamond; Gel; Scowl; Julia Amor	Pelada; Alcalá Norte; Princess Superstar; F.R.A.C; Depresión Sonora; Hofe x 4:40

=== Auditori Rockdelux ===
Thursday, 30 May 2024	Friday, 31 May 2024	Saturday, 1 June 2024
ML Buch; Lambchop; William Basinski; Ángeles, Víctor, Gloria & Javier	Jessica Pratt; Chelsea Wolfe; Joanna Sternberg; Charlemagne Palestine	Shabaka; Wolf Eyes; Lankum; Nala Sinephro

== Primavera a la Ciutat line-up ==
=== Sala Apolo ===
Monday, 27 May 2024	Tuesday, 28 May 2024	Sunday, 2 June 2024
Johnny Jewel; The Chameleons; Cranes; Ariox	Yo La Tengo play covers	Model/Actriz; The Lemon Twigs; Royel Otis; Mandy, Indiana

=== La [2] de Apolo ===
Monday, 30 May 2024	Tuesday, 28 May 2024	Wednesday, 29 May 2024	Sunday, 2 June 2024
TIEMEI; Maustetytöt; John Francis Flynn; Abstract Concrete	Armand Hammer; Irreversible Entanglements; The Messthetics & James Brandon Lewis	JD Twitch (Optimo); Desire; The Dare; Fat Dog; Tom Ravenscroft b2b Deb Grant	CHICA Gang; SoFTT; Dorian Electra; Water from Your Eyes; Crumb

=== Paral·lel 62 ===
Monday, 27 May 2024	Tuesday, 28 May 2024	Sunday, 2 June 2024
Él Mató a un Policía Motorizado; Angélica Garcia; Xebi SF	Les Savy Fav; Sweeping Promises; Balming Tiger; Sandra Monfort	American Football; Militarie Gun; Silica Gel; Las Petunias

=== La Nau ===
Monday, 27 May 2024	Tuesday, 28 May 2024
JJUUJJUU; Rozi Plain; KuTso	Voxtrot; The Mountain Goats

=== LAUT ===
Tuesday, 28 May 2024	Wednesday, 29 May 2024
Mabe Fratti; Daniela Pes	Mabel

=== Razzmatazz ===
Wednesday, 29 May 2024
- The National

=== Jornada Inaugural ===
==== Amazon Music ====
Wednesday, 29 May 2024
- Phoenix
- Stella Maris
- Ratboys
- Tropical Fuck Storm
- Maria Jaume

=== Brunch on the Beach ===
==== Pull&Bear ====
Sunday, 2 June 2024
- The Blessed Madonna
- ANOTR
- Mochakk
- Chloé Caillet
- Pole Position
- Isa Rojas

== Reception ==
Rolling Stone Italia noted that the festival was "divided into two", with a "coexistence between these Shellac t-shirts and these Coachella outfits."
