= Ho visto un re =

Single by Enzo Jannacci

from the album Vengo anch'io. No, tu no
- B-side: "Bobo Merenda"
- Released: 1968
- Genre: Pop, folk music
- Label: RCA
- Songwriters: Dario Fo, Paolo Ciarchi

Enzo Jannacci singles chronology
"L'appassionata/Ho soffrito"	"Ho visto un re"	"Il terzino d'Olanda/Gli zingari"

"Ho visto un re" ('I have seen a king') is a song with text composed by Dario Fo and music by Paolo Ciarchi (credited in the first edition in Ernesto Esposito under the pseudonym Omicron) and performed by Enzo Jannacci, which was first published in 1968, in the 45 rpm Ho visto un re / Bobo Merenda in the recording of the song the orchestra is directed by Luis Bacalov.

== History and meaning ==
This song by Dario Fo was born as a "folk song sham" written on purpose to put it in the show "Ci ragiono e canto", which was composed of a number of folk songs, derived from extensive research on Italian popular songs. The show was presented for the first time in Turin April 16, 1966, at Teatro Carignano.

Ho visto un re is a satire against power. The narrative voice is that of some peasants who sing and point out that all powerful (the King, the Emperor, the Bishop, the Cardinal, the rich people) as they are touched their interests, even minimally, they start to cry. In contrast, the peasants, even when they are deprived of essential things, have to laugh because their «cry hurt the king it hurts the rich people and the Cardinal, they become sad if we cry».

In the lyrics are inserted a few phrases in Milanese language.

In 1977, the musical group La Trinca published a Catalan version called He vist un rei that became very popular, in the album Set anys i un dia de cançons, although it was credited as a folk song.
