= Kutso =

Italian indie rock band

kuTso
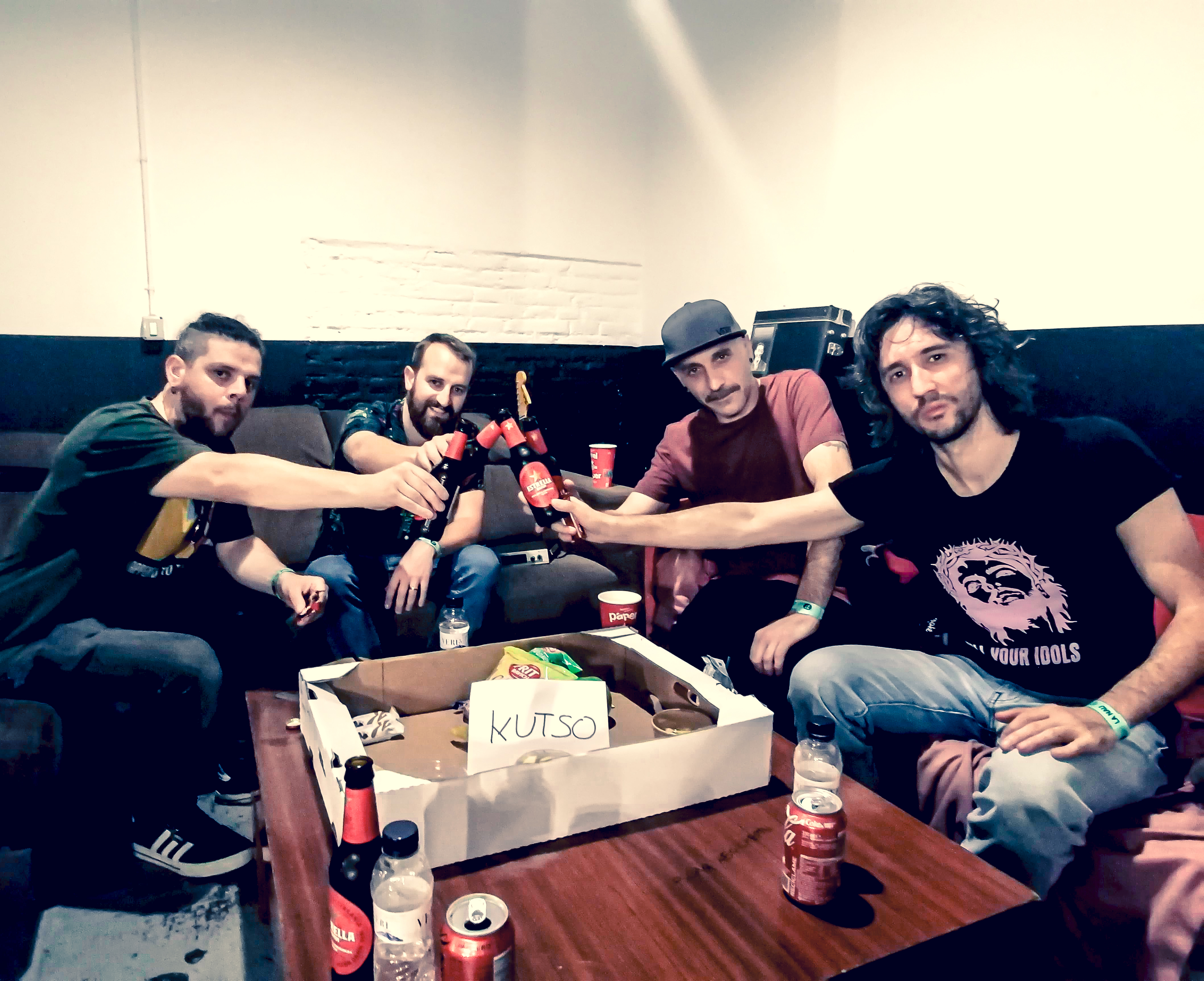
- kuTso backstage at La Nau during the Primavera Sound 2024 festival in Barcelona, Spain

Background information
- Origin: Marino, Lazio, Italy
- Genres: Indie Rock; Alternative Rock; Funk Rock
- Years active: 2006–present
- Label: Universal Records — Good Fellas — kuTso Noise Home
- Website: kutso.com

Kutso, stylised as kuTso, are an Italian indie rock band formed in 2006.

In 2015, Kutso placed second in the Newcomers' section of the 65th Sanremo Music Festival contest with their single Elisa, which was the highest new entry in the Italian airplay chart and peaked at number 16 in the Top 40. Their most successful album was Musica per persone sensibili (Music For Sensitive People), which reached 77 in the Italian album charts in February 2015.

In 2025, the band released the track Ai Fori in collaboration with the Italian Ministry of Culture. The song was commissioned for Rome's historic centre, specifically the Roman Forum and Palatine Hill, marking the first time a rock band dedicated a track to the archaeological site.

== History ==
=== 2006–2011: Early days and Aiutatemi EP ===
The band was formed in Marino by Matteo Gabbianelli. The name kuTso (lowercase "k" and capital "T"), originally "Cut So", is a wordplay on a common Italian profanity for the penis. The name was inspired by Gabbianelli's habit as a teenager of writing profanities on school desks using pseudo-English phonetic spellings.

Gabbianelli began writing and producing autobiographical material as a solo artist, singing and playing drums in his own recording studio. These early tracks established kuTso's signature style: a sharp contrast between upbeat, sunny melodies and sarcastic and pessimistic lyrics. The solo project later evolved into a band with Gabbianelli involving his brother, Fabio Gabbianelli, on guitars and a friend, Leandro Fiacco, on bass. This led to kuTso's first gig as a band on March 9, 2006, when they performed at Rome's Linux Club as the opening act for the poet and actor Remo Remotti.

In 2007, the band won the Heineken Jammin Festival Contest, earning the opportunity to perform at the main event. The event was cancelled, however, after a tornado struck the venue in Mestre, forcing the organizers to suspend all performances. Over the next three years, the band played in clubs across the centre of Italy while focusing on writing and performing songs produced by the Italian songwriter Alex Britti. In late 2010, they were signed to 22R, which released their debut EP, Aiutatemi, in August 2011. The release was accompanied by a music video for its title track. A few months later, they placed first in the music section of the MarteLive contest.

=== 2012–2014: Decadendo (su un materasso sporco) and Perpetuo Tour ===
In 2012, the band embarked on their long-running Perpetuo Tour. Over the following years, kuTso also performed as a support act for several prominent Italian artists, including Fabrizio Moro, Marta sui Tubi, and Linea 77. In the autumn, they were featured in a segment on the La7D tv show That's Italia, hosted by Filippa Lagerbäck.

On 1 April 2013, the band released their first full-length album, Decadendo (su un materasso sporco), which included a new version of the track Aiutatemi, featuring Fabrizio Moro. A month after the release, kuTso were named "Artists of the Week" on MTV New Generation and, on 27 May, they were interviewed on the Deejay TV show Occupy Deejay. That same year, KuTso completed an 80-date tour of Italy, which included an opening act for Primal Scream at Alcatraz club in Milan.

In 2014, the band expanded their live schedule, performing at larger venues and major events. These included the May Day Festival in Rome and Hard Rock Live, where they shared the same bill with The Fratellis and Negramaro. They also opened for Gogol Bordello in Marina di Camerota and Caparezza at Rock in Roma. Furthermore, they performed at the Hit Week Festival in Miami (U.S.A.).

=== 2015–2016: Sanremo festival and Musica Per Persone Sensibili ===
In 2015, kuTso competed in the "Newcomers" (Nuove Proposte) section of the 65th Sanremo Music Festival, placing second with the song Elisa. During the festival, they were awarded the Assomusica Prize, with the jury citing their "creativity and emotional impact in their live performance".

On 12 February, the band released their second album, Musica per persone sensibili, which was recorded at kuTso Noise Home and produced by Matteo Gabbianelli and Alex Britti for Universal Music. The album reached number 77 in a two-week spell on the FIMI's official Top 100 chart.

On 1 May, kuTso made their second appearance at the Concerto del Primo Maggio in Rome. They shared the stage with Alex Britti, who performed dressed as Billy Gibbons of ZZ Top. After the live set, the group travelled to Bologna to perform in Piazza Maggiore at a different May Day concert organised by Eugenio Finardi. In late May, the band released their second single, Io Rosico, accompanied by a music video starring the lead singer dressed as the Hulk.

On 2 June 2015, Matteo Gabbianelli played for the Nazionale Italiana Cantanti (the Italian singers' national football team) at Turin's Juventus Stadium in the annual charity match Partita del Cuore. The event was a major success, raising a record-breaking €2.1 million. The proceeds were donated to Telethon and to the Candiolo Institute for cancer research.

On 30 October, the band released their fourth single, Spray Nasale, accompanied by a surreal music video directed by Luca Tartaglia. Rolling Stone Italia noted that the video was inspired by Nikolai Gogol's short story The Nose, underscoring the concept behind the song. The plot follows a wandering nose and its encounter with a nasal spray that initially appears to alleviate its discomfort. However, the spray is eventually revealed to be a negative influence, offering only an illusory and temporary fix—an allegory for the harmful habits people use to avoid facing deeper pain.

On 20 November, Universal Music released the third volume of the compilation series, We Love Disney, featuring international artists performing Walt Disney classics. The album included a cover version of Supercalifragilisticexpialidocious performed by kuTso's lead singer, Matteo Gabbianelli.

On 27 January 2016, the band was involved in a brief on-air dispute with Italian politician Maurizio Gasparri during the TV2000 show Revolution.

Starting on 28 September 2016, kuTso served as the house band of the Italian edition of the TV show Bring the Noise on Italia 1 for two seasons.

=== 2017–2019: Warm up tour and Che effetto fa ===
On 7 March 2018, kuTso announced via their official Facebook page that they had completed the production of their third album and the music video for its lead single. On 18 March, the band launched their Warm Up Tour with an open-air performance at the Enotica Festival in Rome's CSOA Forte Prenestino. The tour preceded the release of their forthcoming album. The music video for the title track was filmed at Palazzo Chigi in Ariccia, using the same locations where Luchino Visconti filmed his masterpiece, The Leopard. On 16 June, the band performed as the opening act for Fabrizio Moro at Rome's Stadio Olimpico. This performance was followed by the release of the single Manzoni Alieni. On 28 September, the band released Che Effetto Fa. The album, produced by Matteo Gabbianelli and Marco Fabi, marked a shift in sound, introducing the use of synthesisers and moving towards a softer Art Rock approach. The sarcastic and existentialist songwriting of Matteo Gabbianelli was further developed on this record with a more intimate perspective. On 27 October, the band appeared on the Mediaset Iris tv show Splendor. During the episode, kuTso were interviewed about their career in recent years and performed live. On 15 March 2019, they released the single Il Segreto di Giulio. The music video starred actor Giulio Berruti, who also featured on the track as a backing vocalist. The song ironically addresses the idea that natural charm and appeal lead to success. The group performed the single on the Rai television show Stracult.

=== 2020: COVID-19 pandemic and È Andata Così ===
On 1 February 2020, the band released Strade Interrotte, the fifth and final single from the album Che effetto fa. The track is a poignant ballad that was performed live on the Rai Radio 2 show Prendila Così. The release was accompanied by a black-and-white music video, which was premiered as an exclusive on Billboard Italia.

Despite the onset of the COVID-19 pandemic, kuTso remained active, producing three tracks during the lockdown periods. These were collected in the EP È Andata Così, which explores the experience of forced isolation. The lyrics are a reflection on individual and collective reactions to the crisis with a critical and ironic tone, while also offering a more intimate and cryptic perspective. The release was notable for its shift towards a distinctly electronic sound, and for being recorded remotely, with the band members never meeting in person during the process.

On 23 April, Matteo Gabbianelli featured on the charity single Non sarà così strano, a fundraising project for the Italian Red Cross, involving various artists. Building on these collaborations, on 12 May, Gabbianelli joined the indie "all-star" band Le Case Chiuse for the release of the track Santa Madonna. The project featured Gabbianelli alongside a wide range of prominent artists from the indie music scene, including Lodo Guenzi, Andy from Bluvertigo, Alexia and The Libertines .

=== 2022–2024: one-minute singles, Tatanka European Tour, Primavera Sound ===
Between 2022 and 2024, the band produced four additional singles. The tracks from this period, distributed by Ada music and Artist First, are one-minute musical sketches and feature a purely electronic sound. The lyrics range from ironic takes on everyday problems in Luce & Gas, to sarcastic interpretations of biblical passages in È No è.These songs, released without a formal press office, were intended for viral engagement via social media. The accompanying videos were filmed by Gabbianelli, who also directed the livestreamed video performances using a custom-built handheld controller to manage camera cuts and zooms.

During the same period, kuTso returned to the stage with the Tatanka tour. Due to budget constraints, the majority of the tour was held as an electric duo. The name Tatanka, meaning buffalo in the Lakota Sioux language, underscored the band's resilience in enduring the challenges of the post-pandemic era.

On 27 May 2024, the full band performed at the Primavera Sound international festival in Barcelona. kuTso were one of the three Italian acts included on the festival lineup. The organisers of the festival chose the band, stating: " Why are they at Primavera Sound? Because, as we saw last year with Måneskin, having an Italian rock band always cheers you up and changes the pace of the night ." In the same year, the Tatanka tour also included gigs in Brussels and Sofia.

=== 2025: new single Ai Fori and Tatanka tour in Germany ===
In 2025, the full band reconvened in the studio, releasing the single Ai Fori on 7 January. The song was produced by Gabbianelli in collaboration with the Italian Ministry of Culture, to celebrate Rome's historic centre, specifically the Roman Forum and Palatine Hill. It was created for the third edition of Star Walks, a music series produced by the Colosseum Archaeological Park. The music video for the track was filmed on-site in the heart of the archelogical area.

With the release of Ai Fori, kuTso became the first rock band to dedicate a song to the Roman Forum, according to project curator Andrea Schiappelli. Schiappelli noted the uniqueness of the collaboration, stating that the track represented the first rock piece ever written for the archaeological site.

In February, the band extended the Tatanka Tour with two shows in Germany, performing in Berlin and Hamburg, as the opening act for the Italian punk bands Talco and Punkreas.

=== 2026: Concertozzo and collaboration with Elio e le Storie Tese ===
On 27 June 27 2026, kuTso performed at the Concertozzo festival in Biella, organized by Elio e le Storie Tese, performing in front of an audience of over 12,000 people.

On 31 July, the band also performed as the opening act for Elio e le Storie Tese at the Auditorium Parco della Musica in Rome.

On 5 September, kuTso traveled to the Czech Republic to perform at the Barevna Planeta Festival in Ústí nad Labem.

== Members ==
=== Present members ===
  - Matteo Gabbianelli – lead vocals (2005–present)
  - Brian Riente – guitar, backing vocals (2017–present)
  - Luca Lepore – bass, backing vocals (2017–present)
  - Bernardino Ponzani – drums (2018–present)

=== Past members ===
  - Fabio Gabbianelli – guitars, bass (2005–2007)
  - Leandro Fiacco (2006)
  - Giacomo Citro – bass, backing vocals (2008–2011)
  - Alessandro Inolti – drums (2008–2013)
  - Donatello Giorgi – guitar, tenor vocals, backing vocals (2008–2016)
  - Luca Amendola – bass, backing vocals (2011–2016)
  - Simone Bravi – drums (2013–2017)

=== Albums ===
- 2013 - Decadendo (su un materasso sporco)
- 2015 - Musica per persone sensibili
- 2018 - Che effetto fa

=== EPs ===
- 2011 - Aiutatemi
- 2021 - È andata così

=== Singles ===
- 2010 - Aiutatemi
- 2011 - Questa società
- 2012 - E mi eccito
- 2012 - Compro una tv
- 2012 - Via dal mondo
- 2013 - Lo sanno tutti
- 2013 - Alé
- 2013 - Marzia
- 2014 - 3 anni
- 2015 - Elisa
- 2015 - Io Rosico
- 2015 - Spray nasale
- 2015 - L'amore è
- 2015 - Why don't we do it in the road
- 2016 - Grazie alla guerra
- 2018 - Che effetto fa
- 2018 - Manzoni alieni
- 2018 - Uno + Una
- 2019 - Il Segreto di Giulio
- 2020 - Strade interrotte
- 2020 - Potete uscire
- 2020 - Ti chiamo lunedì
- 2020 - Casa dolce casa
- 2022 - Luce & gas
- 2022 - C'è già gente
- 2023 - è No è
- 2024 - Eros mi segue
- 2025 - Ai Fori
