= Maria Beatrice Alonzi =

Italian author and activist

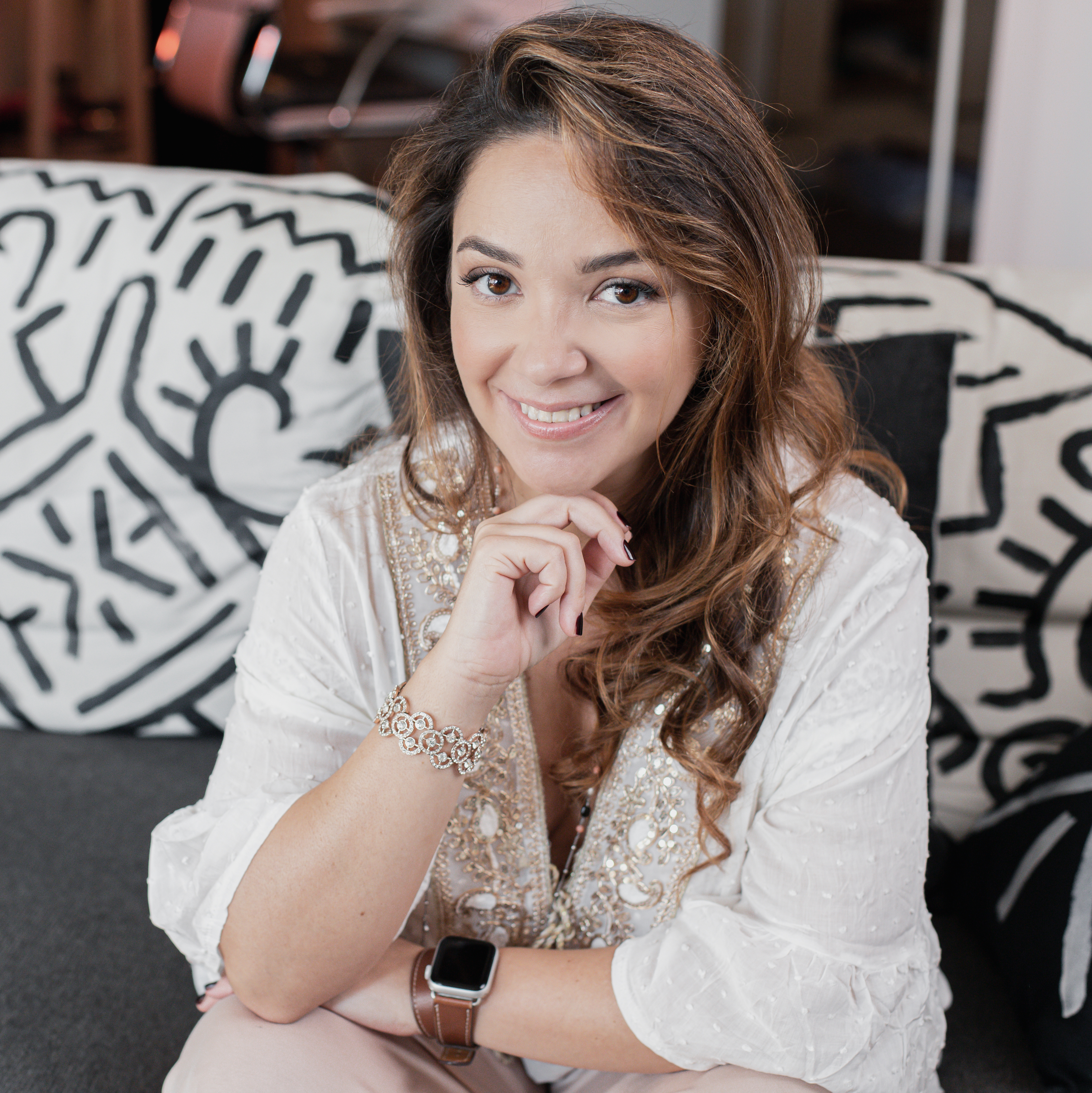
- Occupations: Author; Producer
- Notable work: Il Libricino della Felicità (2019)
- Website: www.mariabeatrice.com

Maria Beatrice Alonzi is an Italian author and producer.

== Stage and broadcast career ==
After performing on various web and television programs such as Sex & Soccer, in 2015 she began creating one-woman live comedy shows on the Periscope app. She has served as the executive producer of Teatro Stabile di Roma, where she has co-created stage pieces that combine elements of escape rooms and a stage play in 2018. She has also performed in improvisational shows such as Teatro ef*ga, as well as a solo stand-up show entitled Stand Up Baby in 2019. Alonzi has developed live video interview programs with musicians and public figures, airing out of locations such as the Hard Rock Café in Rome.

== Activism ==
In 2017 Alonzi worked with the city police of Rome, Italy, on a campaign against romantic partner violence, creating a video map of police stations and their distance from each of the city's subway stations. She also developed digital dance pieces surrounding the hashtag #JustLeave, intended to support and highlight the plight of women in abusive relationships. In addition, she has integrated her advocacy for ending mental health stigma into her artistic work and writing. She has also provided TEDx talks in Cortina.

== Writing ==
Alonzi authored the book Il Libricino della Felicità in 2019, which became a best-seller in Italy after initial self-publication. She later wrote Non voglio più piacere a tutti - Trova il coraggio di amare chi sei e vivere la vita che vuoi (I don't want to please everyone anymore – Find the courage to love who you are and live the life you want) in 2021 on the publisher Vallardi. In 2023 she then published her first novel: Noi, parola di tre lettere (A word of three letters) on the publisher Salani, which has been described as a work that traces a generation that "rejects labels". Later that year her book Tu non sei i tuoi genitori: Libera il tuo cuore dalle scelte di chi ti ha rovinato la vita, anche se non voleva (You are not your parents: Free Your Heart from the Choices of Those Who Ruined Your Life, Even if They Didn’t Mean To) was published by Sperling & Kupfer. She has also published articles in magazines including Grazia.
