= Cochi Ponzoni =

Italian actor, screenwriter, singer, and comedian

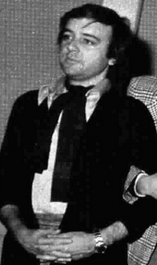
- Ponzoni in 1973
- Born: 11 March 1941 (age 84); Milan, Lombardy, Italy
- Occupations: Actor; screenwriter; singer; comedian
- Years active: 1964–present

Aurelio Ponzoni (born 11 March 1941), known professionally as Cochi Ponzoni, is an Italian actor, screenwriter, singer and comedian.

== Life and career ==
Born Aurelio Ponzoni in Milan, Ponzoni studied at the Italian Liceo classico in Milan, having Enrico Beruschi as his deskmate.

Ponzoni became first known as one half of the popular comedy duo Cochi e Renato, along with Renato Pozzetto.

In 1976 Ponzoni started a parallel solo career, making his film debut as the protagonist in Alberto Lattuada's Cuore di cane and playing the role of the Agostina Belli's lover in The Career of a Chambermaid. After appearing in pair with Pozzetto in a number of comedy films, in the early 1980s, Ponzoni found himself at odds with the work choices by his partner, and chose to focus on dramatic theatre instead, limiting his film career to the occasional sporadic supporting character role. After a long separation, he reunited with Pozzetto in 2000s for a series of television and stage projects.
