= Margherita Fumero =

Italian actress and comedian

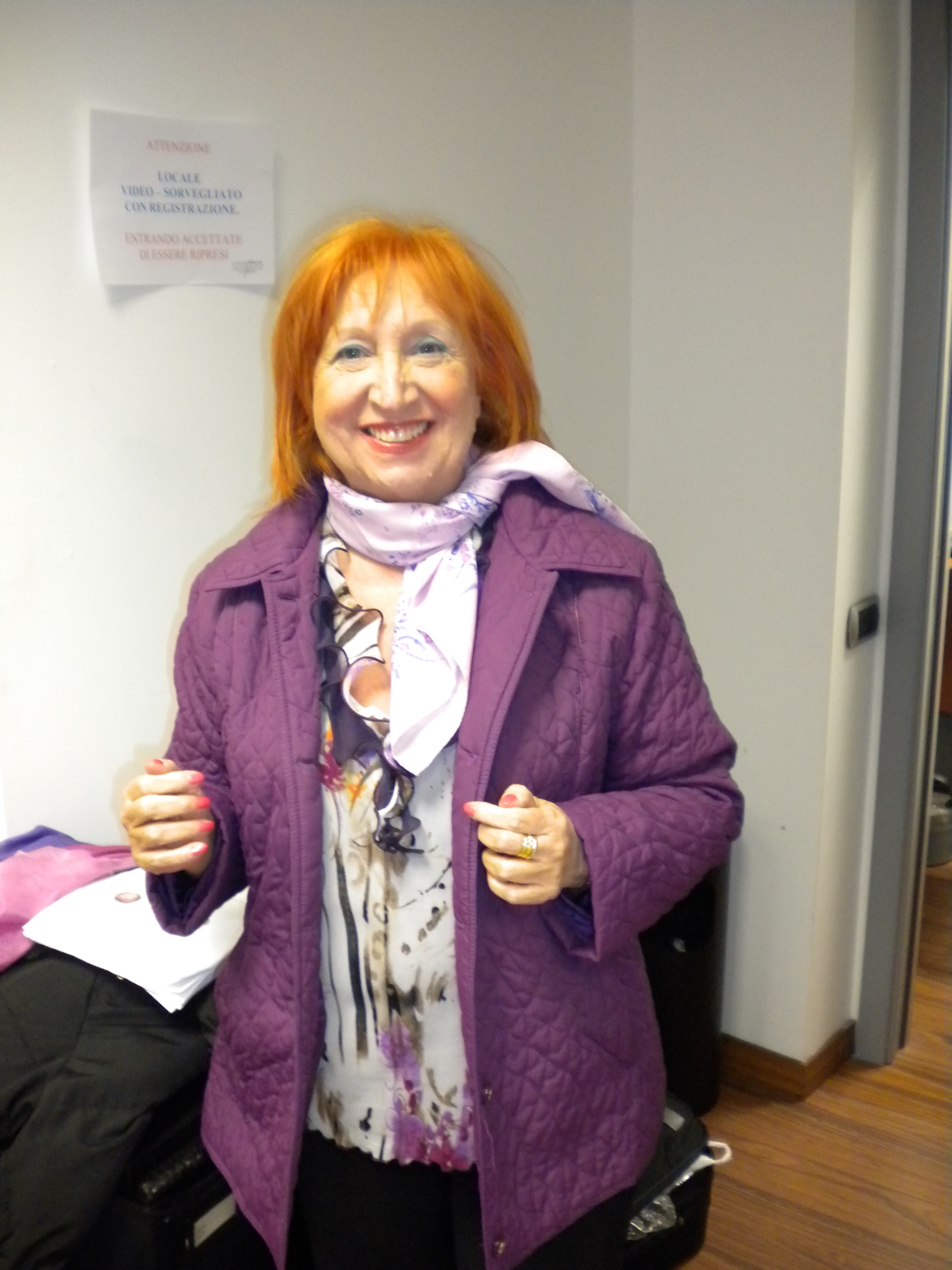
- Fumero in 2010
- Born: 16 October 1947 (age 78); Turin, Italy
- Occupation: Actress
- Height: 1.58 m (5 ft 2 in)

Margherita Fumero (born 16 October 1947) is an Italian actress and comedian.

== Life and career ==
Born in Turin, Fumero became first known as a member of the stage company of Erminio Macario. She achieved a large popularity as the fictional wife of Enrico Beruschi in a series of television variety shows, including Drive In and Sabato al circo, and on stage.

Fumero also appeared in a number of films, often directed by Bruno Corbucci. In 2012 Fumero released an autobiography, Quattro chiacchiere con Margherita.

== Partial filmography ==
- Due sul pianerottolo (1976)
- Little Italy (1978)
- The Gang That Sold America (1979)
- Cat and Dog (1983)
- Classe di ferro (TV, 1989–1991)
- Caméra Café (TV, 2003)
