= Enrico Beruschi =

Italian comedian, actor, singer and television personality

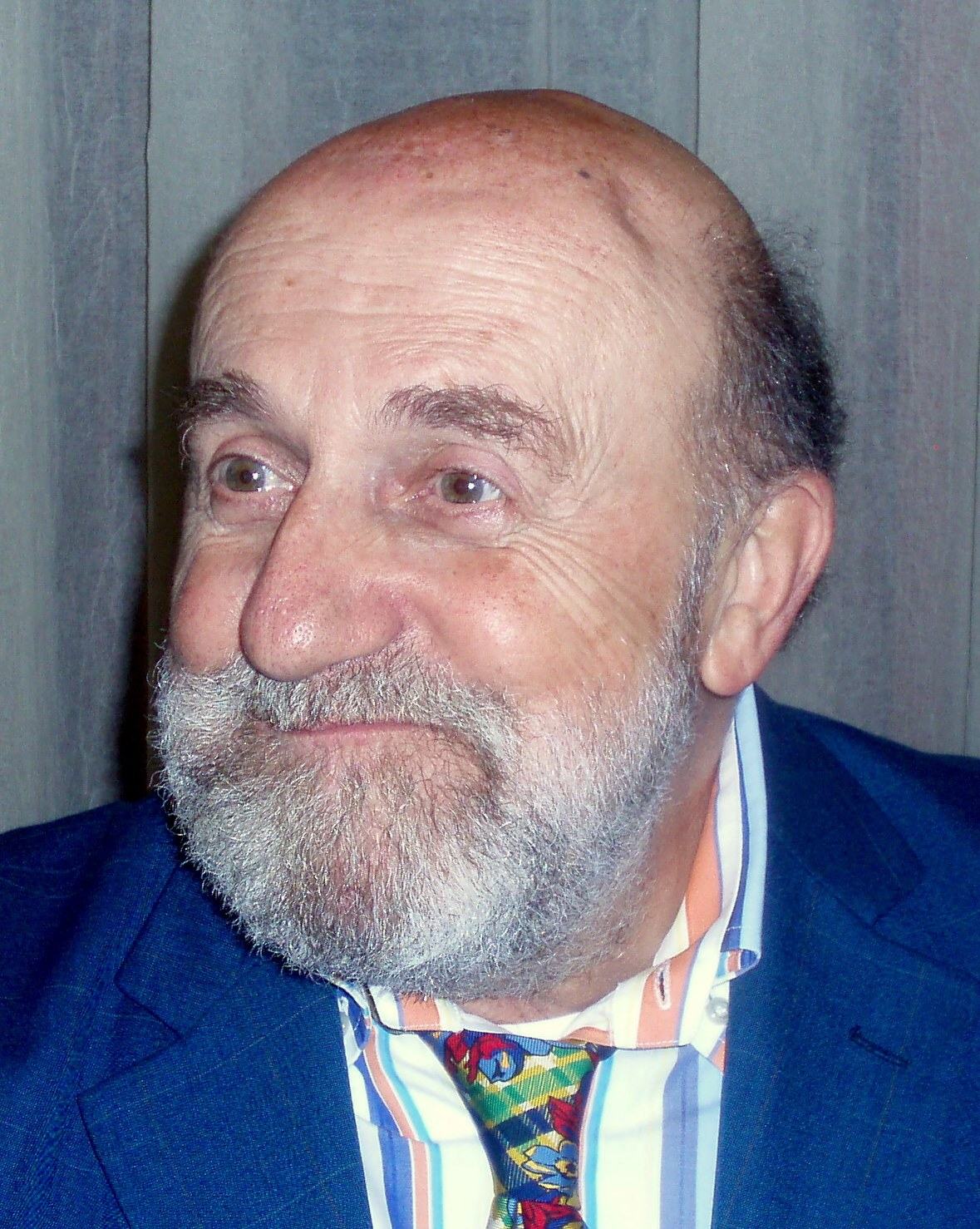
- Beruschi in October 2008
- Born: 5 September 1941 (age 84); Milan, Lombardy, Italy
- Occupations: Comedian; actor; singer; television personality
- Height: 1.7 m (5 ft 7 in)

Enrico Beruschi (born 5 September 1941) is an Italian comedian, actor, singer and television personality.

== Life and career ==
Beruschi studied at the Italian Liceo classico in Milan, having Cochi Ponzoni as his deskmate. Formerly employed in a food company, he began his career as a comedian at the Derby Club in 1972. He had his breakout in 1977, with the RAI variety show Non Stop. In the following years, Beruschi appeared in a large number of TV shows, often performing sketches about a bumbling accountant oppressed by his wife, played by Margherita Fumero, and reached the peak of his popularity with the Italia 1 comedy show Drive in. From the early 1990s, he focused on theater and stand-up comedy.

Beruschi also recorded several comedy songs; in 1979 he entered the competition at the Sanremo Music Festival, finishing fifth with the song "Sarà un fiore".
