= Walter Valdi =

Italian singer, songwriter, author, and actor

Walter Valdi (stage name of Walter Pinnetti; 20 August 1930 – 13 October 2003) was an Italian singer, songwriter, author and actor of several songs and theatrical pieces in Milanese Dialect.

He was born in Cavenago Brianza and died in Milan.
