= Enzo Jannacci =

Italian singer-songwriter, pianist and actor

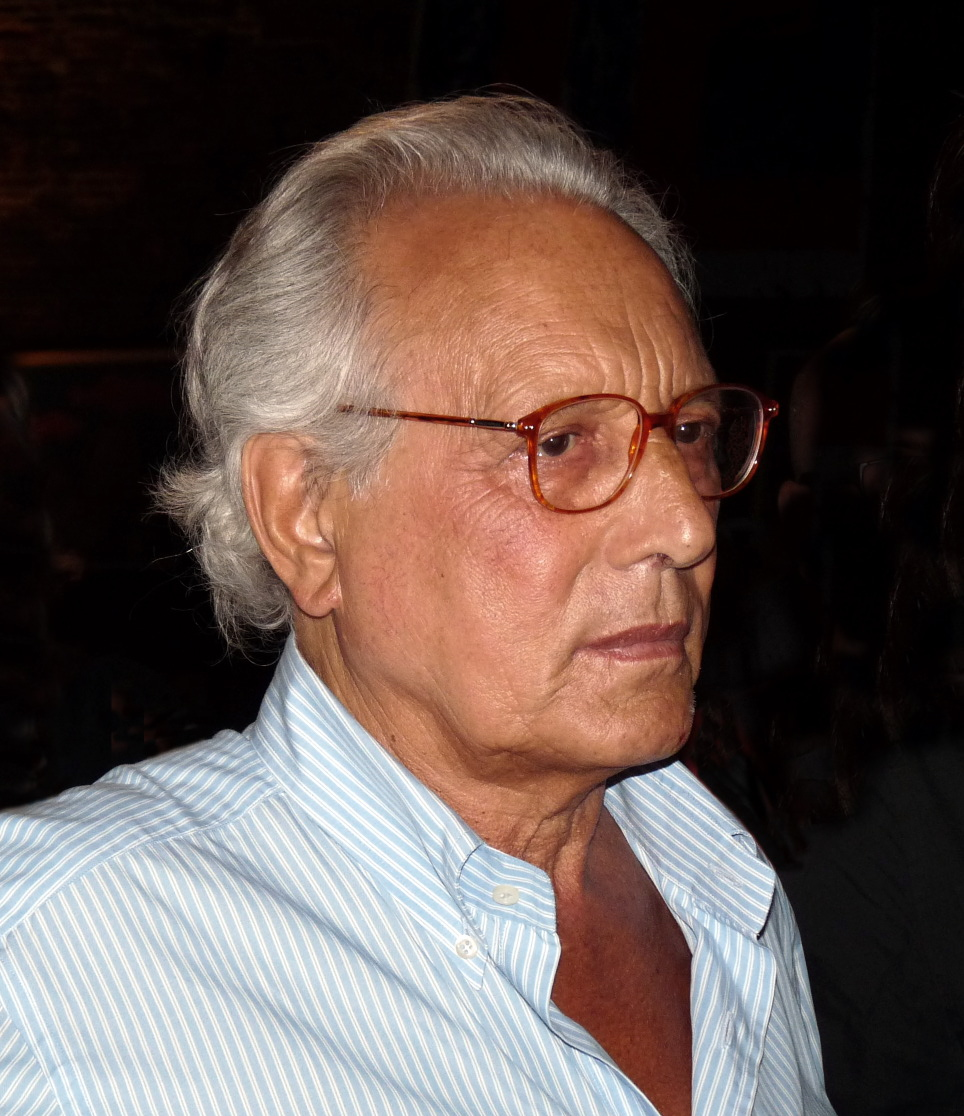
- Enzo Jannacci in 2009

Background information
- Born: Vincenzo Jannacci; 3 June 1935; Milan, Kingdom of Italy
- Died: 29 March 2013 (aged 77) Milan, Italy
- Genres: Folk music; pop music
- Instruments: Vocals; piano
- Years active: 1956–2011
- Labels: Ricordi; Cinevox; Lupus

Vincenzo "Enzo" Jannacci (Italian pronunciation: [vintʃˈɛntso janˈnattʃi]; 3 June 1935 – 29 March 2013) was an Italian singer-songwriter, pianist, actor and comedian. He is regarded as one of the most important artists in the post-war Italian music scene.

Jannacci is widely considered as a master of musical art and cabaret, and in the course of his career has collaborated with many famous Italian musicians, performing artists, journalists, television personalities and comedians. He has written around thirty albums and soundtracks, some of which have since come to be seen as milestones in the history of Italian popular music.

A cardiologist in his day job, he is also regarded as one of the founders of Italian rock and roll music, along with Adriano Celentano, Luigi Tenco and Giorgio Gaber, with whom he collaborated for over forty years.

== Early life ==
Enzo Jannacci was born in Milan on 3 June 1935 to a Lombard mother and a father of Apulian descent – his paternal grandfather, also called Vincenzo, had moved to Milan from Bari just before the onset of the First World War.

His father was an aeronautical official and worked at Forlanini Airport (now more commonly known as Linate). During the Second World War he took part in the Italian resistance movement, in particular during the defence of Milanese aviation at Piazza Novelli, an act which later inspired songs such as Sei minuti all'alba ("Six Minutes to Dawn").

After finishing high school at the Liceo Scientifico Leonardo da Vinci, Jannacci graduated in harmony, composition and conducting at the Milan Conservatory. Later in 1967 he graduated with a degree in medicine from the University of Milan. He left Italy for South Africa and the United States to specialise in cardiac surgery, where he joined the team of Christiaan Barnard, the famous surgeon. On 23 November 1967 he married Giuliana Orefice, who gave birth to Paolo, their only child, five years later. Today Paolo is a musician and conductor.

== Career ==
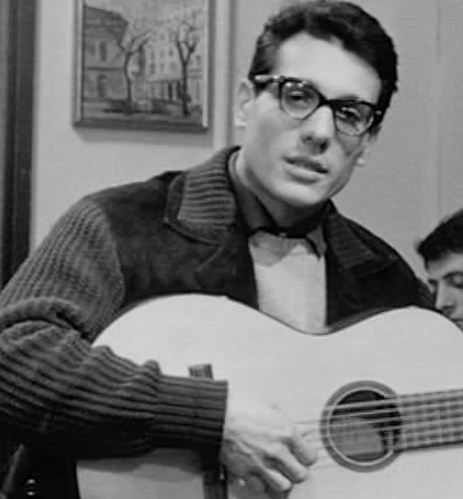
Jannacci in La vita agra (1964)

Jannacci started his musical career in 1956, becoming the keyboardist of the group "Rocky Mountains". The lead member of the group initially was Tony Dallara, later replaced by Giorgio Gaber. In 1957 he became the keyboardist of the Rock Boys, a rock'n'roll group accompanying Adriano Celentano. In 1958, while continuing to perform with Rock Boys, he formed with Gaber the musical duo "I due corsari" with whom he made his first recordings. In the same years he was able to accompany as a jazz pianist several great names such as Stan Getz, Gerry Mulligan, Chet Baker, Bud Powell and Franco Cerri, with whom he recorded several albums.

Jannacci started his solo career in the early sixties, recording two songs, "L'ombrello di mio fratello" and "Il cane con i capelli", that already revealed his ironic and surreal style. In 1962 he debuted on stage with the recital Milanon Milanin. The following year he made his debut as stand-up comedian in the Milan comedy club Derby; there he met Dario Fo and the duo Cochi & Renato, with whom he collaborated several times over the years.

In 1964 his popularity grew significantly thanks to the recital 22 canzoni, of which he was the author together with Dario Fo, and thanks to the song "L'Armando", his first real success. In 1968 he topped the Italian hit parade with the main success of his career, "Vengo anch'io (no tu no)". The same year he took part at the musical contest Canzonissima; he reached the final, but the song he had chosen for the final, "Ho visto un re", was censored by RAI and replaced with "I due zingari". "Ho visto un re" despite the ostracism (RAI even forbade the radio broadcasting of the song) became a classic and reached 7th place on hit parade.

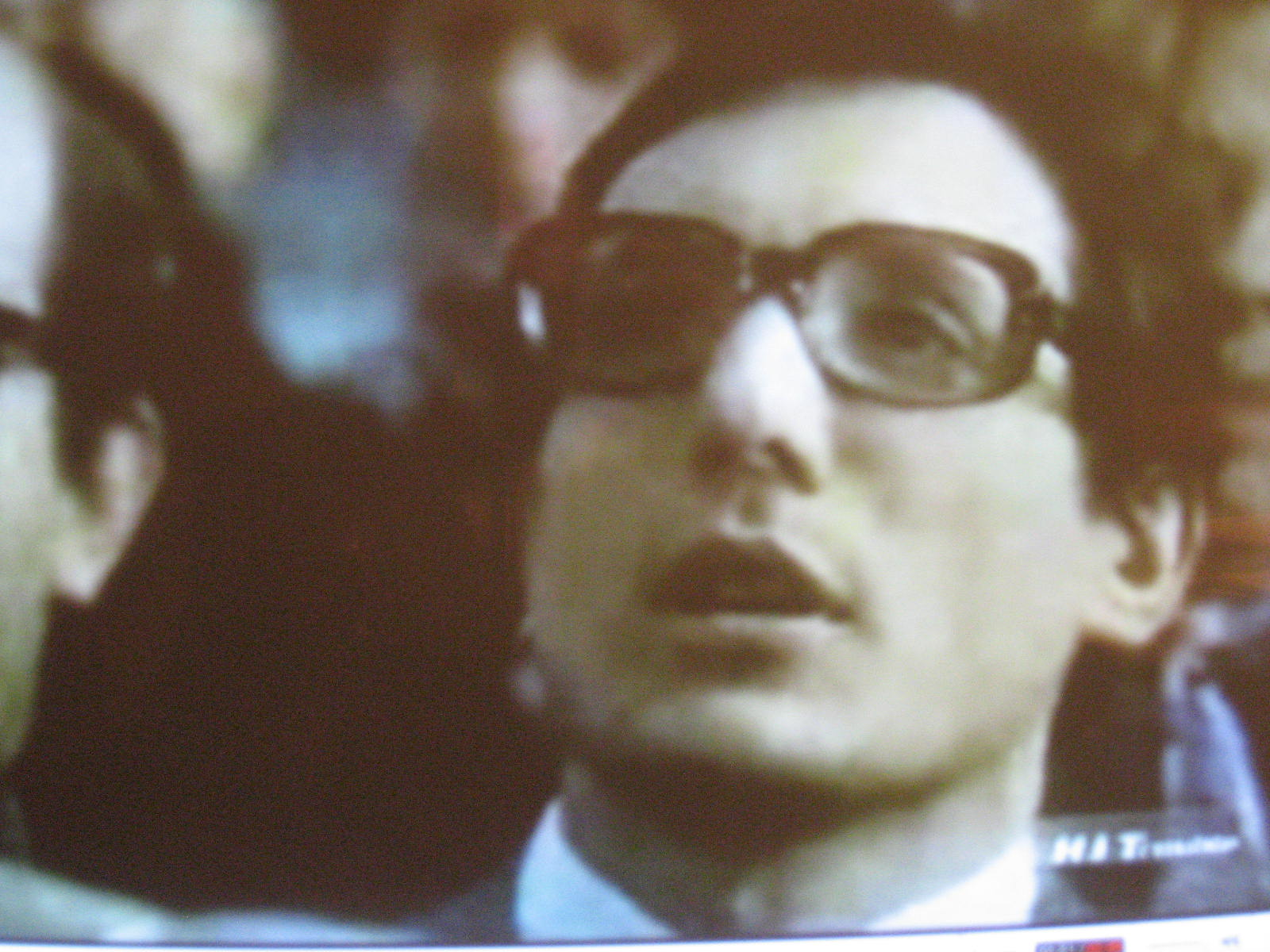
Jannacci in The Audience (1971)

Between 1968 and 1972 Jannacci temporarily slowed his activities focusing on his activity as a doctor; during these years he however appeared as leading actor in two films, Mario Monicelli's Man and Wife (in the segment Il frigorifero) and Marco Ferreri's The Audience. In 1973 he wrote the comedy play Il poeta e il contadino, that was later turned in a TV-series broadcast by RAI, and in 1974 he wrote, together with Beppe Viola, the book L'incompiuter. In these years he also successfully composed several film soundtracks, including Mario Monicelli's Come Home and Meet My Wife and the Academy Award-nominated Lina Wertmüller's Seven Beauties. In 1975 he published the album Quelli che... and the eponymous single became one of his most known songs, especially thanks to the variety show Quelli che... il Calcio that used it as the theme song for eight years.

In 1977 Mina covered ten songs of Jannacci in the album Mina quasi Jannacci, including a duet with the songwriter in the song "E l'era tardi". In 1978 he composed the soundtrack and collaborated to the screenplay of Saxofone, the directorial debut of his longtime friend Renato Pozzetto. In 1979, after several years off, he went back to make live concerts. In these years he also collaborated with Paolo Conte, singing successful songs such as "Sudamerica" and "Bartali".

In 1980 Jannacci released the album Ci vuole orecchio that, pulled by the title song, achieved excellent sales. In 1982 he hosted the variety television Gran simpatico; the same year he reformed the musical duo with Giorgio Gaber for the EP Ja-Ga Brothers. Starting from the second half of the eighties he focused his activity on stage leading several recitals. In 1989 he entered the Sanremo Music Festival with the critically appreciated song "Se me lo dicevi prima"; he came back to Sanremo three more times, in 1990 with "La fotografia" (which won the Critics Award, and was translated in English by Ute Lemper, that recorded with title The Photograph), in 1994 with "I soliti accordi", a duet with the comedian Paolo Rossi, and in 1998 with "Quando il musicista ride". In 1996 he hosted, together with Piero Chiambretti, the Raitre late night show Il laureato.

=== Later years and death ===
The late years were for Jannacci full of tributes and honours, but also difficult on records. While a great number of anthologies and collections were released, between 1994 and his death Jannacci was able to release just two new original albums in 2001 and 2003, with the independent label Ala Bianca. Both the albums won the art music prize Premio Tenco.

On 1 January 2003, his friend Giorgio Gaber died after a long illness at his home near Camaiore. He went to the funeral, which was held two days later at Chiaravalle Abbey where Gaber had married Ombretta Colli, but was only able to say that he had lost a brother. Both Gaber e Jannacci were schoolfriends at Liceo Classico "A. Manzoni" in Milan and then remained closely friends for many years. Their sole common work took place in 1989 for the comedy Aspettando Godot ("Waiting for Godot") of Samuel Beckett, 30 thirty years after the duo I due corsari. In 1990, it was followed by an interview titled Gaber-Jannacci "Aspettiamo Godot" where the duo talked about their common love, both for Beckett's art and their native city.

The 2006 collection The Best 2006 is his latest album, a double CD containing 35 tracks, rearranged and produced by his son Paolo with three new songs.

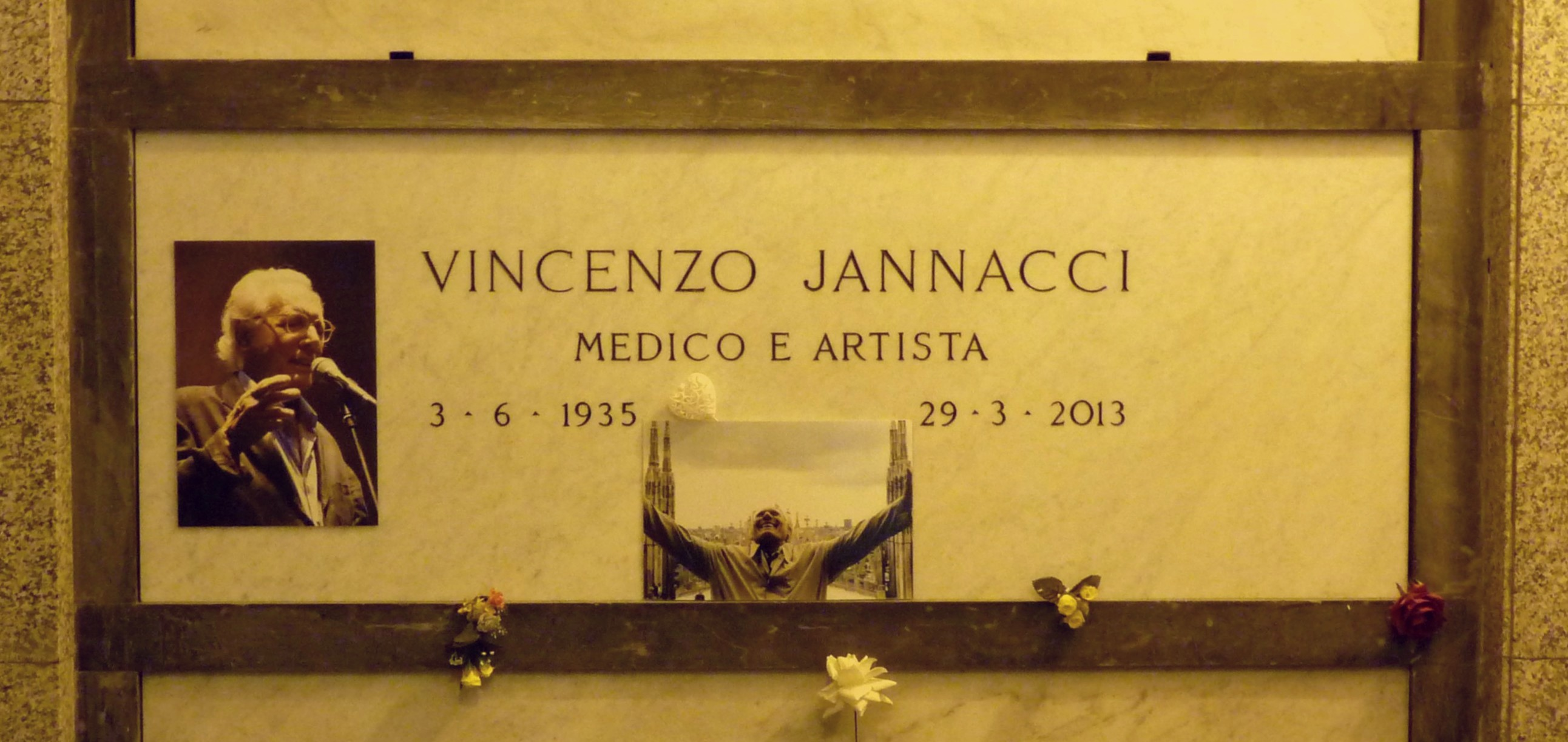
Jannacci's grave at the Monumental Cemetery of Milan

In 2010 Jannacci starred in a leading role in Sergio Castellitto's comedy film La bellezza del somaro. Between 2010 and 2011 he appeared several times on the variety show Zelig as stand-up comedian. On 19 December 2011 Fabio Fazio hosted a TV special about Jannacci, Vengo anch'io. Ovvero Enzo Jannacci, a tribute event full of guests that was the last public appearance for the already diseased Jannacci. In February 2012 he was celebrated by a radio documentary series, Ho visto un re, Enzo Jannacci, broadcast by Radio Due. At the Sanremo Music Festival 2015, the Italian singer Enrico Ruggeri dedicated the piece Tre signori ("Three Lords") to Jannacci, Giorgio Gaber and Giorgio Faletti, imagined while jockeying, writing music and playing the piano.

Jannacci died of cancer on the evening of Friday, 29 March 2013, at around 20:30, at the age of 77 years.

== Discography ==
=== LP and CD records ===
==== Albums ====
- 1964 – La Milano di Enzo Jannacci (Jolly LPJ 5037)
- 1965 – Enzo Jannacci in teatro (live Jolly LPJ 5043)
- 1966 – Sei minuti all'alba (Jolly LPJ 5071)
- 1968 – Vengo anch'io. No, tu no (ARC ALPS 11007)
- 1968 – Le canzoni di Enzo Jannacci (Dischi Ricordi MRP 9050; collection of single records and unpublished Ricordi and Tavola Rotonda)
- 1970 – La mia gente (ARC ALPS 11021)
- 1972 – Giorgio Gaber e Enzo Jannacci (Family single records from 1959 to 1960 with Giorgio Gaber)
- 1972 – Jannacci Enzo (RCA Italiana, PSL 10539)
- 1975 – Quelli che... (Ultima Spiaggia, ZLUS 55180)
- 1976 – O vivere o ridere (Ultima Spiaggia, ZLUS 55189)
- 1977 – Secondo te...Che gusto c'è? (Ultima Spiaggia, ZPLS 34027)
- 1979 – Fotoricordo (Ultima Spiaggia, ZPLS 34075)
- 1980 – Ci vuole orecchio (Dischi Ricordi SMRL 6266)
- 1980 – Nuove registrazioni (Dischi Ricordi-Orizzonte ORL 8430)
- 1981 – E allora...Concerto (Dischi Ricordi SMRL 6282)
- 1983 – Discogreve (Dischi Ricordi SMRL 6302)
- 1983 – Ja-Ga Brothers (CGD with Giorgio Gaber)
- 1985 – L'importante (DDD)
- 1987 – Parlare con i limoni (DDD)
- 1989 – Se me lo dicevi prima e altri successi (collection with unpublished too, DDD)
- 1989 – 30 anni senza andare fuori tempo (collection: live, DDD)
- 1991 – Guarda la fotografia (DDD)
- 1994 – I soliti accordi (DDD)
- 1998 – Quando un musicista ride (collection with unpublished too)
- 2001 – Come gli aeroplani
- 2003 – L'uomo a metà
- 2005 – Milano 3 June 2005 (collection)
- 2006 – The Best 2006 (collection with unpublished too)

==== Collaborations ====
- Mina quasi Jannacci (1977, with Mina)
- Milva la rossa (1980, with Milva)
- Banana à milanesa (2008, with Selton)

=== Singles ===
- L'Armando/La forza dell'amore (4 May 1964)
- Sfiorisci bel fiore/Non è vero (30 April 1965)
- Veronica/Soldato Nencini (17 May 1965)
- Per un basin/Ninna nanna per un bambino (9 February 1966)
- Ho visto un re/Bobo Merenda (1968)
- Il terzino d'Olanda/Gli zingari (1969)
- Mexico e nuvole/Pensare che... (1970)
- Brutta gente/Il panettiere (1974)
- Vincenzina e la fabbrica/Vincenzina e la fabbrica (strumentale) (1974)
- El me indiriss/Quelli che... (1975)
- Linea bianca/Moviola (9 September 1983)
- Mi-mi-la-lan!/La bambina lupo (1984)
- Se me lo dicevi prima/Vita e bottoni (March 1989)

=== Duets ===
- With Claudio Baglioni: Canzone intelligente, E la vita la vita (in Anime in gioco by Claudio Baglioni, 1997), La forza dell'amore and Vincenzina e la fabbrica
- With Adriano Celentano: Ho visto un re
- With Paolo Conte: Bartali
- With Dario Fo (from 1964 to 1980 he contributed to about forty songs of Dario Fo): Ho visto un re
- With Giorgio Gaber (whom he made two albums above mentioned with): Canzone intelligente, Ho visto un re, La strana famiglia and Una fetta di limone
- With Irene Grandi: Bum bum and Ragazzo padre
- With Ligabue: Ci vuole orecchio
- With Mia Martini: Io e te
- With Renato Pozzetto: Canzone intelligente, E la vita la vita and Ho visto un re
- With Paolo Rossi: Ho visto un re and I soliti accordi
- With Enrico Ruggeri: Ci vuole orecchio
- With Roberto Vecchioni: Luci a San Siro and Veronica
- With Francesco De Gregori: Sfiorisci bel fiore
- With Fabrizio De André : Via del campo

The Italian artists who collaborated with Enzo Jannacci: Hiss son Paolo, Beppe Viola, Cochi e Renato, Bruno Lauzi, Loredana Bertè, Lino Toffolo, Umberto Bindi, Giorgio Strehler, Sandro Ciotti, Lina Wertmüller, Massimo Boldi and Pino Donaggio.

=== Soundtracks ===
- Come Home and Meet My Wife (directed by Mario Monicelli, 1974)
- Seven Beauties (directed by Lina Wertmüller, 1975)
- Sturmtruppen (directed by Salvatore Samperi, 1976)
- L'Italia s'è rotta (directed by Steno, 1976)
- Black Journal (directed by Mauro Bolognini, 1977)
- Saxofone (directed by Renato Pozzetto, 1978)
- Little Misunderstandings (directed by Ricky Tognazzi, 1988)

== Filmography ==
Year	Title	Role
1964	La vita agra	The Ballad Singer
1967	Quando dico che ti amo	Ascanio
1970	Man and Wife	Gavino
1972	The Audience	Amedeo
1982	That Night in Varennes (Il mondo nuovo)	Italian Clown
1983	A Joke of Destiny (Scherzo del destino in agguato dietro l'angolo come un brigante da strada)	Gigi Pedrinelli
1997	Figurine	Giuseppe Podestà
2010	Love & Slaps (La bellezza del somaro)	Armando
