= Luigi Tenco =

Italian singer-songwriter (1938–1967)

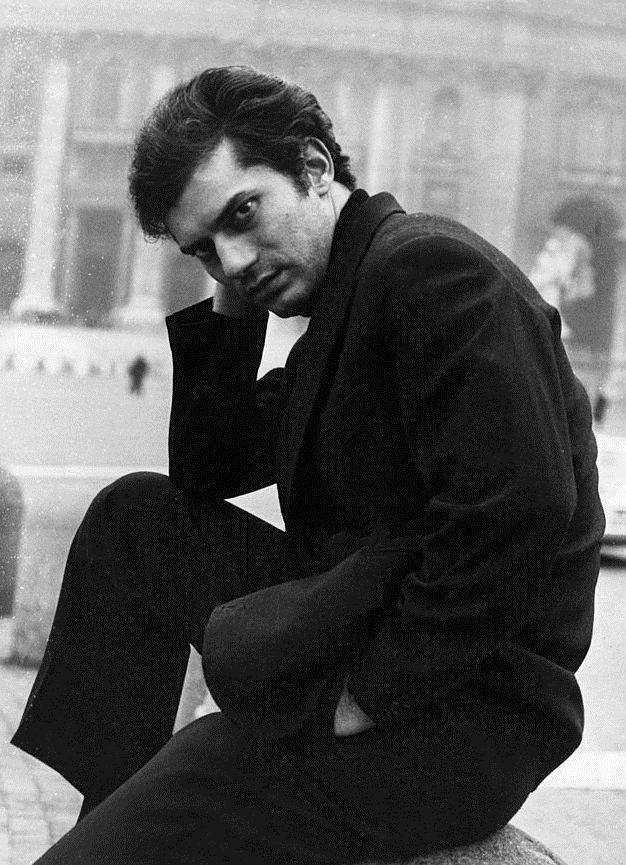
- Tenco in 1967, his last known picture taken before his death

Background information
- Also known as: Gordon Cliff; Dick Ventuno; Charles Aznavour Jr.; Gigi Mai
- Born: 21 March 1938; Cassine, Piedmont, Kingdom of Italy
- Origin: Genoa, Liguria, Italy
- Died: 27 January 1967 (aged 28) Sanremo, Liguria, Italy
- Genres: Folk; pop
- Occupation: Singer-songwriter
- Instruments: Vocals; guitar; piano; clarinet; saxophone
- Years active: 1953–1967
- Labels: Ricordi; Jolly; RCA; Joker; Philips

Luigi Tenco (21 March 1938 – 27 January 1967) was an Italian singer-songwriter. He died on the night of 27 January 1967 after a performance at the Sanremo Music Festival. His death was ruled to be the result of suicide, but even decades later, a plethora of evidence in favor of murder was cause to reopen the investigation twice.

== Biography ==
Tenco was born in Cassine (province of Alessandria) in 1938, the son of Teresa Zoccola. He never knew his father. Teresa Zoccola was married to Giuseppe Tenco, and they had a son, Valentino, but the couple eventually separated, and Teresa moved to Cassine. It has been rumoured that Luigi Tenco was the product of an extramarital relationship between his mother and an unidentified man of the Micca family, for whom she worked at the time: potentially the sixteen-year-old son or his father. When Zoccola discovered the pregnancy, she returned to Cassine. The boy was given the name of her husband, Tenco, who died in a work accident while she was several months pregnant.

Tenco spent his childhood in Cassine and Ricaldone until 1948, when he moved to Liguria, first to Nervi and then to Genoa, where his mother had a wine shop called Enos in the quarter of La Foce. He developed an early interest in music, teaching himself to play guitar, clarinet and saxophone. During high school, Tenco founded the Jelly Roll Morton Boys Jazz band, in which Tenco played the clarinet and Bruno Lauzi, another singer later to become famous, played banjo. Gino Paoli, who would become one of Italy's most famous singers and songwriters, also played with Tenco in the band he was later involved in, I Diavoli del Rock (The Rock Devils).

Tenco made his debut in the world of Italian professional music with the band I Cavalieri (The Knights), which included Giampiero Reverberi and Enzo Jannacci amongst others. During this period, he used the pseudonym Gigi Mai. In 1961, Tenco released his first single under his real name, entitled Quando ("When").

He started university studying electronic engineering, trying to comply with the wishes of his mother and brother. He twice failed the Analytic and Projective Geometry exam (a course he took with professor Eugenio Giuseppe Togliatti, the elder brother of Communist party leader Palmiro Togliatti). Later, he was enrolled in political science, where he gave only two exams.

Tenco was interested in cinema and videomaking. In 1962, he began a short-lived cinematic experience, with Luciano Salce's movie La Cuccagna. He also collaborated on the soundtrack of the film, and introduced his friend Fabrizio De André (unknown at the time) through the song La ballata dell'eroe (Ballad for a hero). Director Luigi Comencini considered Tenco for the role of Bube in his film La ragazza di Bube, based on Carlo Cassola's novel. He ultimately chose George Chakiris, the West Side Story star, instead. During this period, Tenco formed a strong friendship with the Genoese anarchist poet Riccardo Mannerini. In 1963, however, his friendship with Gino Paoli broke up, due to a troubled relationship with the actress Stefania Sandrelli.

Tenco's first LP, Ballate e Canzoni, was released in 1962. One of the songs, "Cara maestra" ("Dear Teacher"), was censored by the then-thriving Italian media censorship. For this song, he was banned from Rai for two years. The censors struck again in the following year, against his songs "Io sì" ("I Would"), considered too sexually explicit, and "Una brava ragazza" ("A Good Girl"), where Tenco express his admiration for a '60s "bad girl". In September 1964, he released "Ho capito che ti amo", a song written by him with musical arrangement by Ezio Leoni. It was released on the Italian record label Jolly as Side A of a 45 rpm, side B being "Io lo so già". In Argentina, "Ho capito che ti amo" was the soundtrack of the popular soap opera El amor tiene cara de mujer.

In 1966, enduring a period of compulsory military service, he released "Un giorno dopo l'altro" (One Day after Another) for RCA. The military service did not stop him from travelling to Argentina together with Gianfranco Reverberi to meet the fans of El amor tiene cara de mujer. How he managed to arrive in Argentina while his passport was still in possession of the Italian Army is unknown. Moreover, under the military service, one was not allowed to leave Italy, and the punishment was detention, which he did not experience according to his service record book.

In Rome during the same year, he met and befriended the Italian-French singer Dalida. It was widely assumed that they became lovers; however, Tenco had a fiancée, Valeria, to whom, a decade after his death, many letters were discovered. Tenco's mother also confirmed that he treated Dalida only as a good friend. Lino Patruno, a close friend of Tenco, described his relationship with Dalida as a 'marketing trick'.

== 1967 Sanremo Festival and death ==
In January 1967, Tenco took part in the Sanremo Music Festival 1967. It was rumoured that he participated against his will. On 26 January he performed the song "Ciao amore, ciao" ("Bye Bye, My Love") with Dalida. The video of the performance is lost; however, the audio track, recorded from the radio, survives. That evening, Tenco sang badly and off time, presumably because he had taken barbiturates with alcohol shortly before the performance to cope with anxiety. Later that evening he was seen at the Nostromo restaurant together with Dalida, other friends and colleagues. He left early, leaving the group behind.

At approximately 2 in the morning of 27 January, Dalida found Tenco dead in his room, No. 219, at the Hotel Savoy. (Note: However, Guarneri and Ragone claim that Dalida was at least the third person to see the body.) Tenco died from a single gunshot wound to the head. His death was ultimately ruled a suicide. However, due to multiple violations in the investigation, the case was reopened twice, still with a verdict of a suicide.

Tenco was apparently upset after learning that his song had been eliminated from the final competition. Several people close to Tenco witnessed that he was more upset with the corruption and bribery at the festival and planned to hold a press conference to unveil it all.

Tenco was buried in Ricaldone in a small ceremony, while the festival officials kept the show going and tried to evade a scandal. Almost no colleagues were present at the funeral.

=== The inquiry ===
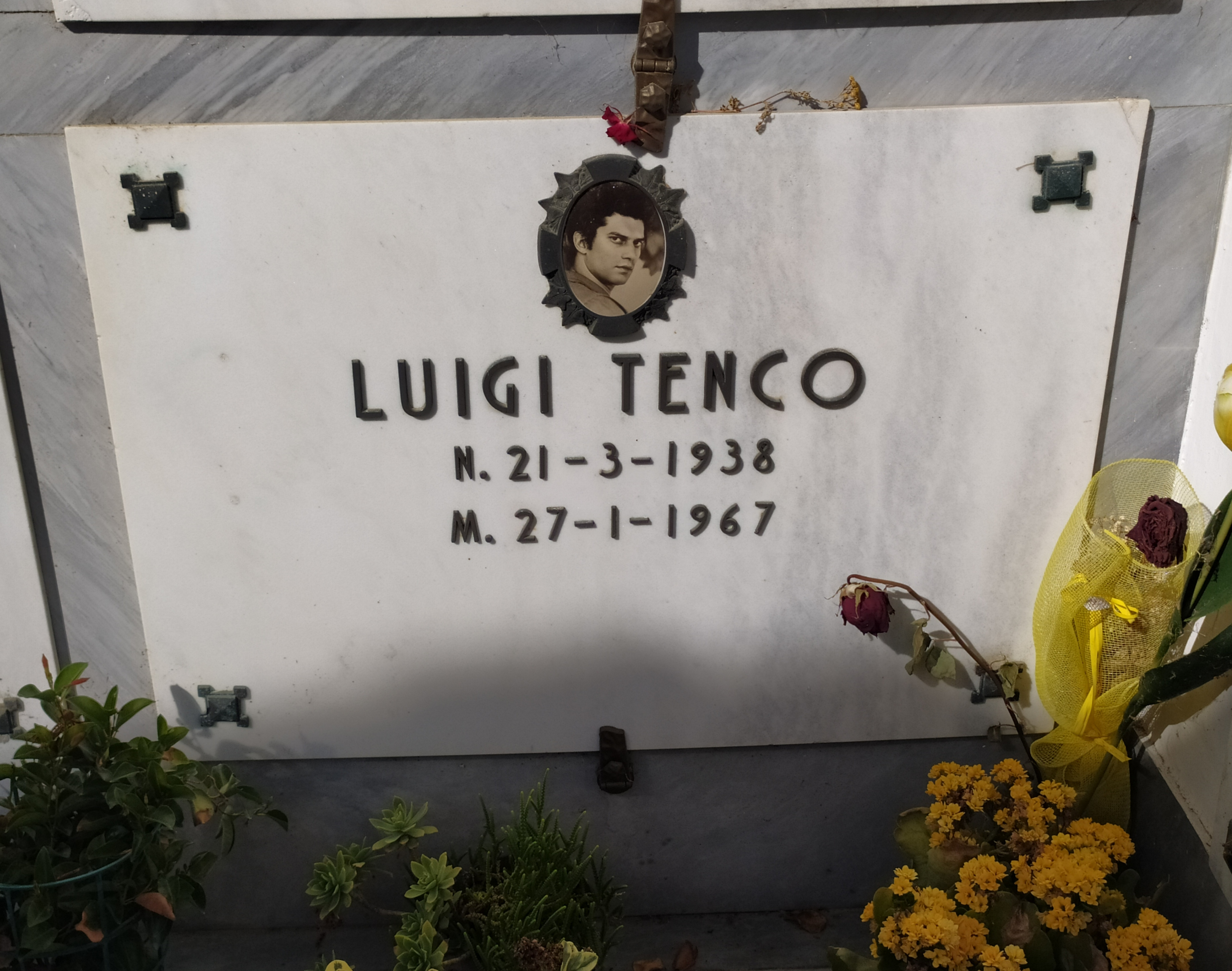
Grave of Luigi Tenco

Initially ruled as a suicide, Tenco's case was reopened in 2005–2009 and then again in 2013–2015.

In 2004, on TV program Domenica in, commissario Arrigo Molinari, the detective who led the case, when asked by host Paolo Bonolis, stated that he was sure that Tenco did not commit suicide and defined his death as "a collective murder". He also justified his own faults concerning the Tenco inquiry by declaring that he had been prevented from investigating properly. In 1967, upon learning of Tenco's death from Dalida and still in his own home, Molinari phoned ANSA and declared that the singer had killed himself. All this took place before he had arrived at the Savoy and before the forensic team could intervene. Shortly after the quoted 2004 interview, Molinari was stabbed to death in his own hotel in Andora.

In 1967, no autopsy was performed on the singer's corpse, and no paraffin test or calligraphic analysis on the suicide note with which he explained his final gesture were done. Some police photographs from the scene, unedited and publicly shown only in 1994, showed that Tenco's body and face was bruised. On the back side of his head a trauma was evident, which forensics didn't confirm to be related to post-mortem falling. Additionally, the concierge of the Savoy, when asked if he had seen Tenco return that night, stated that the keys were not on the reception desk and not that he had seen Tenco return. Traces of sand were spotted on Tenco's hair, clothes and in his car, though journalists confirmed that the car was washed before going to Nostromo.

Dalida testified that on the night of 26 January, while still at the Nostromo, she received a phone call from the Hotel Londra in Sanremo. She told diners she had been notified that Tenco was at the Savoy and was feeling unwell. Dalida did not rush to the Savoy, which was about five minutes away, instead stopping to buy cigarettes and then picking up her ex-husband, Lucien Morisse. They arrived at the Savoy after 40 minutes, where she discovered Tenco's lifeless body.

Notably, the alleged farewell note does not appear in the police report, as it was not found in room 219 on the night of Tenco's death. In fact, the note came into the hands of the police from a third party. Initially, in Dalida's room, No. 104, she gave it to Tenco's friend Sergio Modugno, who passed it on to Piero Vivarelli, a journalist and another of Tenco's friends, who finally gave it to the police. The note read: "I cared for the Italian public and I dedicated in vain five years of my life to them. I'm doing this not because I'm tired of life (I'm not) but as a gesture of dissent against the public who chose 'Io, tu e le rose' for the final night and against the commission that selected 'La rivoluzione'. I hope this will clear somebody's head." Forensics later detected word casts on the note, as if there had been at least one other sheet with different writing superimposed on the one found. The words in the casts are ‘gioco’ (game) and ‘già’ (already). Game, in particular, would seem compatible with Tenco's intention to denounce clandestine betting, as he had announced to his fiancée Valeria in the above-mentioned telephone call. One of the police photos of commissario Molinari showed him standing at the scene with two sheets of paper. Moreover, experts never confirmed the signature on the note to be Tenco's and noted a spelling mistake that a native speaker of Italian who dealt with writing daily would not have made. The family also didn't recognize the handwriting as Tenco's. As supposed by journalists, the alleged suicide note may have been the last page of a document written by Tenco for a different aim.

The Italian judicial system later began re-examining Luigi Tenco's suicide. It was pointed out that the bullet hole was on the left temple, while the singer was right-handed. On 15 February 2006, Italian police exhumed Tenco's body for further investigation. The next day, results from the new autopsy and ballistics analysis were reported. According to Italian experts, what had been thought to be the entry hole on Tenco's left temple was actually the exit site. The bullet trajectory was said to be compatible with suicide.

Nevertheless, criminologists Pasquale Ragone and Nicola Guarneri, in their book Le ombre del silenzio (The shadows of silence, 2013), pointed out several incongruences between the shell casing of the bullet found in Tenco's room and the bullet Tenco's Walther PPK handgun would fire. Professor of ballistic forensics Martino Farneti proved that they did not match. As there was no proof or official statement declaring that Tenco's Walther PPK was actually present in his room the night he died, and police registers show that the pistol was actually found in his car, Guarneri and Ragone wrote that Tenco may have been killed. The actual weapon may have been a Beretta 70, as it is possible to put a silencer on this type of handgun (similar to a Walther PPK). In fact, no one heard the sound of gunshots the night Tenco died, not even singer Lucio Dalla, whose room was next to Tenco's, or journalist Sandro Ciotti, whose room was opposite Tenco's. At the time of Tenco's death, a door to the inner garden was located only three meters from room 2019, the same one used by police to transport the body.

In 1993, journalists Marco Buttazzi and Andrea Pomati rediscovered the file compiled by the police in 1967. In the attached photos, they saw that Tenco's legs (from ankles to feet) were positioned under a wooden cabinet. Suspicious of the anomalous position of the corpse, they investigated further and found out that the photos did not depict the real crime scene. They interviewed the undertaker from the case, who stated that commissario Molinari had ordered the body to be immediately transferred to the morgue and before the arrival of the forensic team; it was then taken back to the Savoy and reassembled to allow the photos to be taken and attached to the above-mentioned file.

Music producer and friend Paolo Dossena stated that he drove Tenco's car from Rome, where the songwriter lived, to Sanremo. On the way, while passing through a roadblock on the Aurelia, he discovered that Tenco had his Walther PPK in the dashboard of his car. He later confronted the songwriter, who confessed that he had a gun because someone in the past few weeks had tried to force him off a steep road near Santa Margherita Ligure while he was driving.

In the early '90s, Tenco's older brother Valentino met a woman, Valeria, who had in her possession several letters written by Tenco himself that stated that they had been engaged, their relationship starting in 1964 and lasting until his death. In one of these letters, Tenco writes that his relationship with Dalida was nothing but a clumsy attempt to forget Valeria, who, months before, had left him. He describes Dalida as: "spoiled, neurotic, ignorant, who rejects the idea of being defeated in her profession as in private life". Valentino Tenco identified those letters as written by his brother.

To date, besides the official conclusion of suicide, journalists have come up with three theories:

- A robbery gone bad — on 26 January, Tenco won almost 3 million liras at a casino, but the money was never found after his death;
- A murder of jealousy — Morisse, Dalida's ex-husband, was seen leaving room 219. Morisse was known as an incredibly jealous man who tried to control Dalida and her affairs even after their divorce;
- A murder to prevent Tenco from causing a scandal by uncovering the bribery and corruption schemes at the Sanremo Festival.

== Tributes ==
Shortly after Tenco's death, his friend and songwriter Fabrizio De André wrote the song Preghiera in gennaio (A prayer in January) for him, in which he describes a benevolent God welcoming those who committed suicide into Heaven despite the moral condemnation of the bigots.

In 1974, the Tenco Award was established, and has been held every year since in Sanremo. Many of the most renowned Italian singer-songwriters from the 1970s explicitly declared Tenco's influence on their work. Francesco De Gregori's album Bufalo Bill of 1976 contained a song, "Festival", about Tenco's suicide; it points out the hypocrisy with which the music establishment tried to minimize the dramatic event, to let the show go on.

In 1999, the play Solitudini – Luigi Tenco e Dalida, written and directed by Maurizio Valtieri, was performed in Rome.

French journalist and novelist Philippe Brunel wrote a fiction book, La nuit de San Remo ("The night of Sanremo"), in which he dramatises the arduous search for the truth about Tenco's death.

In 2005, the French television channel TV5 carried a full-length dramatisation of the love affair between Tenco and Dalida. Tenco was played by Alessandro Gassman, and Dalida by Sabrina Ferilli.

== Discography ==
=== Albums ===
- 1962: Luigi Tenco
- 1965: Luigi Tenco
- 1966: Tenco

Compilations / Unreleased materials

- 1972: Luigi Tenco
- 1972: Luigi Tenco canta Tenco, De André, Jannacci, Bob Dylan
- 1977: Agli amici cantautori
- 1984: Luigi Tenco

=== Extended plays ===
- 1967: Ti ricorderai di me...
- 1967: Se stasera sono qui
- 1969: Pensaci un po'

=== Singles ===
- 1959: "Mai"/"Giurami tu"
- 1959: "Mi chiedi solo amore"/"Senza parole"
- 1959: "Amore"/"Non so ancora" (as Gigi Mai)
- 1959: "Vorrei sapere perché"/"Ieri" (as Gigi Mai)
- 1960: "Tell Me That You Love Me"/"Love Is Here to Stay" (as Gordon Cliff)
- 1960: "Quando"/"Sempre la stessa storia" (as Dick Ventuno)
- 1961: "Il mio regno"/"I miei giorni perduti"
- 1961: "Quando"/"Triste sera"
- 1961: "Una vita inutile"/"Ti ricorderai"
- 1961: "Ti ricorderai"/"Quando"
- 1961: "Ti ricorderai"/"Se qualcuno ti dirà"
- 1961: "Quando"/"Se qualcuno ti dirà"/"Ti ricorderai"/"I miei giorni perduti"
- 1961: "Senza parole"/"In qualche parte del mondo"
- 1962: "Come le altre"/"La mia geisha"
- 1962: "In qualche parte del mondo"
- 1962: "Quello che conta"/"Tra tanta gente"/"La ballata dell'eroe"
- 1962: "Angela"/"Mi sono innamorato di te"
- 1962: "Quando"/"Il mio regno"
- 1963: "Io sì"/"Una brava ragazza"
- 1964: "Ragazzo mio"/"No, non è vero"
- 1964: "Ho capito che ti amo"/"Io lo so già"
- 1965: "Tu non hai capito niente"/"Non sono io"
- 1966: "Se sapessi come fai"/"Un giorno dopo l'altro"
- 1966: "Lontano lontano"/"Ognuno è libero"
- 1967: "Ciao amore, ciao"/"E se ci diranno"
- 1967: "Quando"/"Mi sono innamorato di te"
- 1967: "Ti ricorderai"/"Angela"
- 1967: "Guarda se io"/"Vedrai vedrai"
- 1967: "Io vorrei essere là"/"Io sono uno"
- 1967: "Se stasera sono qui"/"Cara maestra"
- 1968: "Pensaci un po'"/"Il tempo dei limoni"
- 1970: "Vedrai vedrai"/"Ah... l'amore l'amore"
- 1984: "Serenella"

== Sources ==
- Colonna, Aldo (2017). Vita di Luigi Tenco. Bompiani. ISBN 9788858774380.
- De Angelis, Enrico; Deregibus, Enrico (2013). Il mio posto nel mondo. BUR. ISBN 978-88-586-4864-3.
- Molteni, Ferdinando (2015). L'ultimo giorno di Luigi Tenco. Novara: Guinti. ISBN 978-88-098-1612-1.
- Campanella, Mario; Palmieri, Gaspare (2017). Forse non sarà domani: Invenzioni a due voci su Luigi Tenco. Roma: Lit Edizioni. ISBN 978-88-6231-966-9.
- Guarneri, Nicola; Ragone, Pasquale (2013). Le ombre del silenzio. Castelvecchi. ISBN 978-88-6944-968-0.
