= Cochi e Renato =

Italian musical and comedy duo

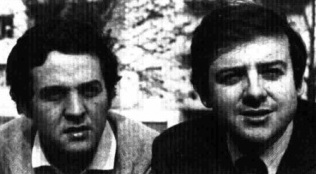
Cochi e Renato in 1972

Cochi e Renato are an Italian musical and comedy duo composed of comedians Renato Pozzetto and Cochi Ponzoni.

== Life and career ==
Ponzoni and Pozzetto were childhood friends, and they grew accustomed to perform together in front of an audience of friends and relatives. Their professional debut took place in 1965 in the small cabaret club Cab 64 in Milan, where they performed along with Lino Toffolo and Bruno Lauzi. They were also joined by Enzo Jannacci and Felice Andreasi with whom they formed the comedy ensemble Motore, who had a good success in Milan. The couple became first known in the late 1960s thanks to the RAI innovative variety shows Quelli della domenica (1968) and È domenica, ma senza impegno (1969). Characterized by a peculiar comic verve, filled with paradoxical and surreal moods, their popularity increased in the early 1970s with the variety show Il poeta e il contadino and with the participation with the musical show Canzonissima. The couple began to crack in 1974, when Pozzetto started devoting himself to a full-time film career. After a long separation, Ponzoni and Pozzetto reunited in 2000s for a series of television and stage projects.

Cochi e Renato were also very active as singer-songwriters (often with the collaboration of Enzo Jannacci), and they had several commercial hits; their most successful song is "E la vita la vita", which reached the first place at the Italian charts in 1974.
