= Italy in the Eurovision Song Contest 2020 =

- Eurovision Song Contest 2020
- Participating broadcaster: Radiotelevisione italiana (RAI)
- Country: Italy
- Selection process: Sanremo Music Festival 2020
- Selection date: 8 February 2020

Competing entry
- Song: "Fai rumore"
- Artist: Diodato
- Songwriters: Antonio Diodato; Edwyn Roberts

Placement
- Final result: Contest cancelled

Participation chronology

Italy was set to be represented at the Eurovision Song Contest 2020 with the song "Fai rumore", written by Antonio Diodato and Edwyn Roberts, and performed by Diodato himself. The Italian participating broadcaster, Radiotelevisione italiana (RAI), appointed the winner of the "Campioni" section of the Sanremo Music Festival 2020 as it representative in the contest. However, the contest was cancelled due to the COVID-19 pandemic.

== Background ==
Prior to the 2020 contest, Radiotelevisione italiana (RAI) had participated in the Eurovision Song Contest representing Italy forty-five times since its first entry during the inaugural contest in 1956. Since then, it has won the contest on two occasions: in 1964 with the song "Non ho l'età" performed by Gigliola Cinquetti and in 1990 with the song "Insieme: 1992" performed by Toto Cutugno. RAI has withdrawn from the Eurovision Song Contest a number of times with their most recent absence spanning from 1998 until 2010. Its return in 2011 with the song "Madness of Love", performed by Raphael Gualazzi, placed second—their highest result, to this point, since their victory in 1990. In 2019, the song "Soldi" by Mahmood, placed second with 472 points.

As part of its duties as participating broadcaster, RAI organises the selection of its entry in the Eurovision Song Contest and broadcasts the event in the country. Between 2011 and 2013, the broadcaster used the Sanremo Music Festival as an artist selection pool where a special committee would select one of the competing artist, independent of the results in the competition, as the Eurovision entrant. The selected entrant was then responsible for selecting the song they would compete with. For 2014, RAI forwent using the Sanremo Music Festival artist lineup and internally selected their entry. Since 2015, the winning artist of the Sanremo Music Festival is rewarded with the opportunity to represent Italy at the Eurovision Song Contest, although in 2016 the winner declined and the broadcaster appointed the runner-up as the Italian entrant.

== Before Eurovision ==
=== Sanremo Music Festival 2020 ===
Italian broadcaster RAI confirmed that the performer that would represent Italy at the 2020 Eurovision Song Contest would be selected from the competing artists at the Sanremo Music Festival 2020. According to the rules of Sanremo 2020, the winner of the festival earns the right to represent Italy at the Eurovision Song Contest, but in case the artist is not available or refuses the offer, the organisers of the event reserve the right to choose another participant via their own criteria. The competition took place between 4 and 8 February 2020 with the winner being selected on the last day of the festival.

Twenty four artists competed in Sanremo 2020. Among the competing artists were former Eurovision Song Contest entrants Raphael Gualazzi and Francesco Gabbani, who represented Italy in 2011 and 2017 respectively. Additionally, Elodie's song was co-written by Mahmood, who represented Italy in 2019.

On 7 February, Bugo and Morgan were disqualified for failing to deliver their performance during the fourth evening.

| Artist | Song | Songwriter(s) |
|---|---|---|
| Achille Lauro | "Me ne frego" | Achille Lauro, Davide Petrella, Daniele Dezi, Daniele Mungai, Matteo Ciceroni, Edoardo Manozzi |
| Alberto Urso | "Il sole ad est" | Gerardo Pulli, Piero Romitelli |
| Anastasio | "Rosso di rabbia" | Marco Anastasio, Stefano Tartaglini, Marco Azara, Luciano Serventi |
| Bugo and Morgan | "Sincero" | Andrea Bonomo, Cristian Bugatti, Gianmario Bertolotti, Marco Castoldi |
| Diodato | "Fai rumore" | Antonio Diodato, Edwyn Roberts |
| Elettra Lamborghini | "Musica (e il resto scompare)" | Davide Petrella, Michele Canova |
| Elodie | "Andromeda" | Dario Faini, Alessandro Mahmoud |
| Enrico Nigiotti | "Baciami adesso" | Enrico Nigiotti |
| Francesco Gabbani | "Viceversa" | Francesco Gabbani, Luigi De Crescenzo |
| Giordana Angi | "Come mia madre" | Giordana Angi, Manuel Finotti |
| Irene Grandi | "Finalmente io" | Andrea Righi, Gaetano Curreri, Roberto Casili, Vasco Rossi |
| Junior Cally | "No grazie" | Antonio Signore, Jacopo Ettorre, Eugenio Maimone, Leonardo Grillotti, Federico Mercuri, Giordano Cremona |
| Le Vibrazioni | "Dov'è" | Davide Simonetta, Francesco Sarcina, Roberto Casalino |
| Levante | "Tikibombom" | Claudia Lagona |
| Marco Masini | "Il confronto" | Daniele Coro, Federica Camba, Marco Masini |
| Michele Zarrillo | "Nell'estasi o nel fango" | Valentina Parisse, Michele Zarrillo |
| Paolo Jannacci | "Voglio parlarti adesso" | Andrea Bonomo, Emiliano Bassi, Maurizio Bassi, Paolo Jannacci |
| Piero Pelù | "Gigante" | Luca Chiaravalli, Pietro Pelù |
| Pinguini Tattici Nucleari | "Ringo Starr" | Riccardo Zanotti |
| Rancore | "Eden" | Dario Faini, Tarek Iurcich |
| Raphael Gualazzi | "Carioca" | Davide Pavanello, Davide Petrella, Raffaele Gualazzi |
| Riki | "Lo sappiamo entrambi" | Riccardo Marcuzzo, Riccardo Scirè |
| Rita Pavone | "Niente (Resilienza 74)" | George Merk |
| Tosca | "Ho amato tutto" | Pietro Cantarelli |

==== Final ====
The 23 Big Artists each performed their entry again for a final time on 8 February 2020. A combination of public televoting (34%), press jury voting (33%) and expert jury voting (33%) selected the top three to face a superfinal vote, then the winner of Sanremo 2020 was decided. Diodato was declared the winner of the contest with the song "Fai rumore".

Final – 8 February 2020
| R/O | Artist | Song | Percentage | Place |
|---|---|---|---|---|
| 1 | Michele Zarrillo | "Nell'estasi o nel fango" | 1.83% | 18 |
| 2 | Elodie | "Andromeda" | 6.09% | 7 |
| 3 | Enrico Nigiotti | "Baciami adesso" | 2.63% | 19 |
| 4 | Irene Grandi | "Finalmente io" | 3.71% | 9 |
| 5 | Alberto Urso | "Il sole ad est" | 5.34% | 14 |
| 6 | Diodato | "Fai rumore" | 13.40% | 1 |
| 7 | Marco Masini | "Il confronto" | 2.78% | 15 |
| 8 | Piero Pelù | "Gigante" | 6.66% | 5 |
| 9 | Levante | "Tikibombom" | 3.11% | 12 |
| 10 | Pinguini Tattici Nucleari | "Ringo Starr" | 8.43% | 3 |
| 11 | Achille Lauro | "Me ne frego" | 6.25% | 8 |
| 12 | Junior Cally | "No grazie" | 1.53% | 22 |
| 13 | Raphael Gualazzi | "Carioca" | 3.18% | 11 |
| 14 | Tosca | "Ho amato tutto" | 4.64% | 6 |
| 15 | Francesco Gabbani | "Viceversa" | 11.64% | 2 |
| 16 | Rita Pavone | "Niente (Resilienza 74)" | 1.94% | 17 |
| 17 | Le Vibrazioni | "Dov'è" | 6.32% | 4 |
| 18 | Anastasio | "Rosso di rabbia" | 2.50% | 13 |
| 19 | Riki | "Lo sappiamo entrambi" | 1.26% | 23 |
| 20 | Giordana Angi | "Come mia madre" | 1.26% | 20 |
| 21 | Paolo Jannacci | "Voglio parlarti adesso" | 1.60% | 16 |
| 22 | Elettra Lamborghini | "Musica (e il resto scompare)" | 2.02% | 21 |
| 23 | Rancore | "Eden" | 2.94% | 10 |

Superfinal – 8 February 2020
| R/O | Artist | Song | Expert Jury (33%) | Press Jury (33%) | Televote (34%) | Total | Place |
|---|---|---|---|---|---|---|---|
| 1 | Diodato | "Fai rumore" | 36.33% | 57.97% | 23.93% | 39.32% | 1 |
| 2 | Francesco Gabbani | "Viceversa" | 38.67% | 24.16% | 38.85% | 33.94% | 2 |
| 3 | Pinguini Tattici Nucleari | "Ringo Starr" | 25.00% | 17.87% | 37.21% | 26.80% | 3 |

== At Eurovision ==
The Eurovision Song Contest 2020 was to take place at Rotterdam Ahoy in Rotterdam, Netherlands and consists of two semi-finals on 12 and 14 May and the final on 16 May 2020. According to Eurovision rules, all nations with the exceptions of the host country and the "Big Five" (France, Germany, Italy, Spain and the United Kingdom) are required to qualify from one of two semi-finals in order to compete for the final; the top ten countries from each semi-final progress to the final. As a member of the "Big 5", Italy automatically qualifies to compete in the final. In addition to their participation in the final, Italy is also required to broadcast and vote in one of the two semi-finals. However, the contest was cancelled due to the COVID-19 pandemic.
