= List of number-one hits of 2003 (Italy) =

This is a list of the number-one hits of 2003 on FIMI's Italian Singles and Albums Charts.

| Week | Issue date | Song | Artist | Album | Artist |
|---|---|---|---|---|---|
| 1 | 3 January | "Feel" | Robbie Williams | Tracks | Vasco Rossi |
| 2 | 10 January | "Feel" | Robbie Williams | Tracks | Vasco Rossi |
| 3 | 17 January | "Feel" | Robbie Williams | Tracks | Vasco Rossi |
| 4 | 24 January | "Mundian To Bach Ke" | Panjabi MC | Io non mi sento italiano | Giorgio Gaber |
| 5 | 31 January | "Mundian To Bach Ke" | Panjabi MC | Io non mi sento italiano | Giorgio Gaber |
| 6 | 7 February | "Mundian To Bach Ke" | Panjabi MC | Io non mi sento italiano | Giorgio Gaber |
| 7 | 14 February | "Almeno tu nell'universo" | Elisa | Io non mi sento italiano | Giorgio Gaber |
| 8 | 21 February | "Dedicato a te" | Le Vibrazioni | Io non mi sento italiano | Giorgio Gaber |
| 9 | 28 February | "Almeno tu nell'universo" | Elisa | Diamonds on the Inside | Ben Harper |
| 10 | 7 March | "Almeno tu nell'universo" | Elisa | The Mass | Era |
| 11 | 14 March | "Gocce di memoria" | Giorgia | Dalla pace del mare lontano | Sergio Cammariere |
| 12 | 21 March | "Gocce di memoria" | Giorgia | Meteora | Linkin Park |
| 13 | 28 March | "Gocce di memoria" | Giorgia | Meteora | Linkin Park |
| 14 | 4 April | "Gocce di memoria" | Giorgia | Dalla pace del mare lontano | Sergio Cammariere |
| 15 | 11 April | "American Life" | Madonna | Home | Simply Red |
| 16 | 18 April | "Gocce di memoria" | Giorgia | American Life | Madonna |
| 17 | 25 April | "Gocce di memoria" | Giorgia | American Life | Madonna |
| 18 | 2 May | "Gocce di memoria" | Giorgia | Dalla pace del mare lontano | Sergio Cammariere |
| 19 | 9 May | "Un'emozione per sempre" | Eros Ramazzotti | The Golden Age of Grotesque | Marilyn Manson |
| 20 | 16 May | "Un'emozione per sempre" | Eros Ramazzotti | The Golden Age of Grotesque | Marilyn Manson |
| 21 | 23 May | "Un'emozione per sempre" | Eros Ramazzotti | Sono io, l'uomo della storia accanto | Claudio Baglioni |
| 22 | 30 May | "Un'emozione per sempre" | Eros Ramazzotti | 9 | Eros Ramazzotti |
| 23 | 6 June | "Un'emozione per sempre" | Eros Ramazzotti | 9 | Eros Ramazzotti |
| 24 | 13 June | "Un'emozione per sempre" | Eros Ramazzotti | 9 | Eros Ramazzotti |
| 25 | 20 June | "Bring Me to Life" | Evanescence | 9 | Eros Ramazzotti |
| 26 | 27 June | "Bring Me to Life" | Evanescence | 9 | Eros Ramazzotti |
| 27 | 4 July | "Get Busy" | Sean Paul | 9 | Eros Ramazzotti |
| 28 | 11 July | "Get Busy" | Sean Paul | 9 | Eros Ramazzotti |
| 29 | 18 July | "Bring Me to Life" | Evanescence | 9 | Eros Ramazzotti |
| 30 | 25 July | "Get Busy" | Sean Paul | 9 | Eros Ramazzotti |
| 31 | 1 August | "Get Busy" | Sean Paul | 9 | Eros Ramazzotti |
| 32 | 8 August | "Get Busy" | Sean Paul | 9 | Eros Ramazzotti |
| 33 | 15 August | "Get Busy" | Sean Paul | 9 | Eros Ramazzotti |
| 34 | 22 August | "Get Busy" | Sean Paul | 9 | Eros Ramazzotti |
| 35 | 29 August | "Bring Me to Life" | Evanescence | 9 | Eros Ramazzotti |
| 36 | 5 September | "You Weren't There" | Lene Marlin | Dance of Death | Iron Maiden |
| 37 | 12 September | "White Flag" | Dido | Ladra di vento | Giorgia |
| 38 | 19 September | "Never Leave You (Uh Oooh, Uh Oooh)" | Lumidee | Sacred Love | Sting |
| 39 | 26 September | "Obsesión" | Aventura | Sacred Love | Sting |
| 40 | 3 October | "Obsesión" | Aventura | Che fantastica storia è la vita | Antonello Venditti |
| 41 | 10 October | "Obsesión" | Aventura | The Platinum Collection | Nomadi |
| 42 | 17 October | "Obsesión" | Aventura | We Broke the Rules | Aventura |
| 43 | 24 October | "Obsesión" | Aventura | In Time: The Best of R.E.M. 1988–2003 | R.E.M. |
| 44 | 31 October | "Obsesión" | Aventura | In Time: The Best of R.E.M. 1988–2003 | R.E.M. |
| 45 | 7 November | "Obsesión" | Aventura | Cattura | Renato Zero |
| 46 | 14 November | "Obsesión" | Aventura | Cattura | Renato Zero |
| 47 | 21 November | "Obsesión" | Aventura | Giro d'Italia | Ligabue |
| 48 | 28 November | "Obsesión" | Aventura | Giro d'Italia | Ligabue |
| 49 | 5 December | "Obsesión" | Aventura | Giro d'Italia | Ligabue |
| 50 | 12 December | "Obsesión" | Aventura | Giro d'Italia | Ligabue |
| 51 | 19 December | "Obsesión" | Aventura | Giro d'Italia | Ligabue |
| 52 | 26 December | "Obsesión" | Aventura | Giro d'Italia | Ligabue |

== See also ==
- 2003 in music
- List of number-one hits in Italy
