= Al mio paese =

2026 single by Serena Brancale, Levante and Delia

Single by Serena Brancale, Levante and Delia

from the album Sacro
- Released: 3 April 2026
- Genre: Folk pop
- Length: 3:17
- Label: Atlantic; Isola degli Artisti
- Composers: Serena Brancale; Alfredo Bruno; Carlo Avarello; Fabio Barnaba
- Lyricists: Serena Brancale; Claudia Lagona; Delia Buglisi; Alessandro La Cava; Federica Abbate
- Producers: Carlo Avarello; Gorbaciof

Serena Brancale singles chronology
"Bésame mucho" (2026)	"Al mio paese" (2026)	"Partenope" (2026)

Levante singles chronology
"Sei tu" (2024)	"Al mio paese" (2026)	"Malìa" (2026)

Delia singles chronology
"Bésame mucho" (2025)	"Al mio paese" (2026)	"Rum e cioccolata" (2026)

Music video
- "Al mio paese" on YouTube

"Al mio paese" (Italian: [al ˈmiːo paˈeːze]; "In My Hometown") is a song co-written and recorded by Italian singers Serena Brancale, Levante and Delia, released on 3 April 2026 through Atlantic Records and Isola degli Artisti as the eighth single from Brancale's third studio album Sacro.

== Background ==
The song, written by all three singers together with Alessandro La Cava and Federica Abbate, is produced by Carlo Avarello and Manuel Finotti, known professionally as Gorbaciof. Brancale explained that the song had been written with Levante prior to their participation in the 76th Sanremo Festival, with the songs "Qui con me" and "Sei tu" respectively. In an interview with Il Fatto Quotidiano, Brancale explained her decision to collaborate with the artist and to also include Delia in the song:

"I like sharing music with women who tell the story of their South in a different way. I left to fulfil my dream. Without getting too caught up in controversy or always looking for what’s wrong, I think there are some wonderful things in the South Italy and that everyone is doing their best to improve things. For me, my album is a celebration of all that. I mean, I'm an outsider and I say so, and I miss the South so much."

== Critical reception ==
The song was received with positive reviews from music critics, who praised its production and the decision to bring the three artists together.

== Music video ==
The music video, directed by Marco Braia and produced by Isola degli Artisti, was released to coincide with the track's release via Brancale's YouTube channel.

== Charts ==
Chart performance for "Al mio paese"
Chart (2026)	Peak position
Italy (FIMI)	3
Italy Airplay (EarOne)	1

== Certifications ==
Certifications for "Al mio paese"
Region	Certification	Certified units/sales
Italy (FIMI)	Platinum	200,000^{‡}
^{‡} Sales+streaming figures based on certification alone.
