= Qui con me =

"Qui con me" (Italian for 'Here with Me') may refer to:

- "Qui con me" (Super Vocal song), 2020
- "Qui con me" (Serena Brancale song), 2026
