= Eugenio in Via Di Gioia =

Italian indie folk/pop band

- Origin: Turin, Italy
- Genres: Indie folk Indie pop
- Years active: 2012–present
- Label: Island Records/Universal Music Group (2018–present)
- Members: Eugenio Cesaro; Emanuele Via; Paolo Di Gioia; Lorenzo Federici

Eugenio in Via Di Gioia is an Italian indie folk/pop band formed in 2012.

== History ==
The band is named after its members – "Eugenio" after Eugenio Cesaro; "Via" after Emanuele Via; "Di Gioia" after Paolo Di Gioia – and can be roughly translated both as "Eugene in Joy Street" and "Eugene [is] about to [have] joy".

The band started as street artists, coming from a tradition of dance halls, swing, and Italian folk music, and more recently nu-folk. They made headlines for having entertained passengers on a train from Turin-Rome which was delayed for over 6 hours.

They debuted in 2013 with the extended play EP urrà and their first studio album Lorenzo Federici – named after the fourth member Lorenzo Federici – was released in 2014, by the label Libelulla Music. In 2014 they also won the critics award at Buscaglione Prize.

In June 2015, they were invited as guests to the Léo Ferré Award. In July the same year, they released their video "Non ancora", which was selected by MTV New Generation and previewed on Vevo.

In April 2016, the band embarked on their first European tour. In September 2016, they launched their new song "Pam" via a video game named "Pamman".

In February 2017, the first single from their second album was released, along with a videoclip. This song entered the Spotify "Viral Top 50" in Italy, and the video exceeded 120,000 views. In April 2017, their second album Tutti su per terra was released, featuring Willie Peyote on the song "Selezione naturale".

On 4 February 2019, the band announced the release of their third studio album entitled Natura viva, which came out on 1 March the same year.

In October 2019 they announced their participation in Young Sanremo 2019. They reached the semifinal with their song "Tsuanami", meaning they passed through to be able to participate in the "Newcomers" section of the Sanremo Music Festival 2020 with the song "Tsunami", produced by Dardust. The song won the Critics' Award "Mia Martini". However, they were eliminated in the semi-final against Tecla.

In January 2020, they announced the release of a new compilation album entitled Tsunami (Forse vi ricorderete di noi per canzoni come), including songs from previous albums and their Sanremo entry.

On 20 May 2022, their new album Amore e Rivoluzione was released, including collaborations with artists such as Francesca Michielin and Elio. On 9 December they released the single Tornano.

In January 2023, the band released the official anthem for FantaSanremo, entitled "C'è un tam-tam". On 3 November 2023 the single "Stormi" was released. On 5 December the single "Lentiggini" was released. On 22 March 2024 the single "Portami" was released.

On 28 June 2024 the single "Farò più rumore del ratatata", in collaboration with Willie Peyote was released. Peyote's voice was modified to imitate that of Iranian rapper Toomaj who had been arrested and convicted for propaganda against the regime.

They released the single "Buio", on 7 March 2025, ahead of releasing their fifth studio album, L'amore è tutto on 21 March 2025.

== Discography ==
=== Studio albums ===
- Lorenzo Federici (2014)
- Tutti su per terra (2017)
- Natura viva (2019)
- Amore e rivoluzione (2022)
- L'amore è tutto (2025)

=== Compilations ===
- Tsunami (Forse vi ricorderete di noi per canzoni come) (2020)

=== Extended plays ===
- EP urrà (2013)

=== Singles ===
- "Giovani illuminati" (2017)
- "Chiodo fisso" (2017)
- "Altrove" (2018)
- "Cerchi" (2018)
- "Camera mia" (2019)
- "Lettera al prossimo" (2019)
- "Tsunami" (2019)
- "L'unico sveglio" (2019)
- "A metà strada" feat. Moglii (2020)
- "Non vedo l'ora di abbracciarti" (2021)
- "Umano" (2021)
- "Terra" (2022)
- "Tornano" (2022)
- "C'è un tam-tam (FANTASANREMO 2023 OFFICIAL ANTHEM)" (2023)
- "Stormi" (2023)
- "Lentiggini" (2023)
- "Portami" (2024)
- "Farò più rumore del ratatata" (2024)
- "Buio" (2025)
