= Serena Brancale =

Italian singer-songwriter (born 1989)

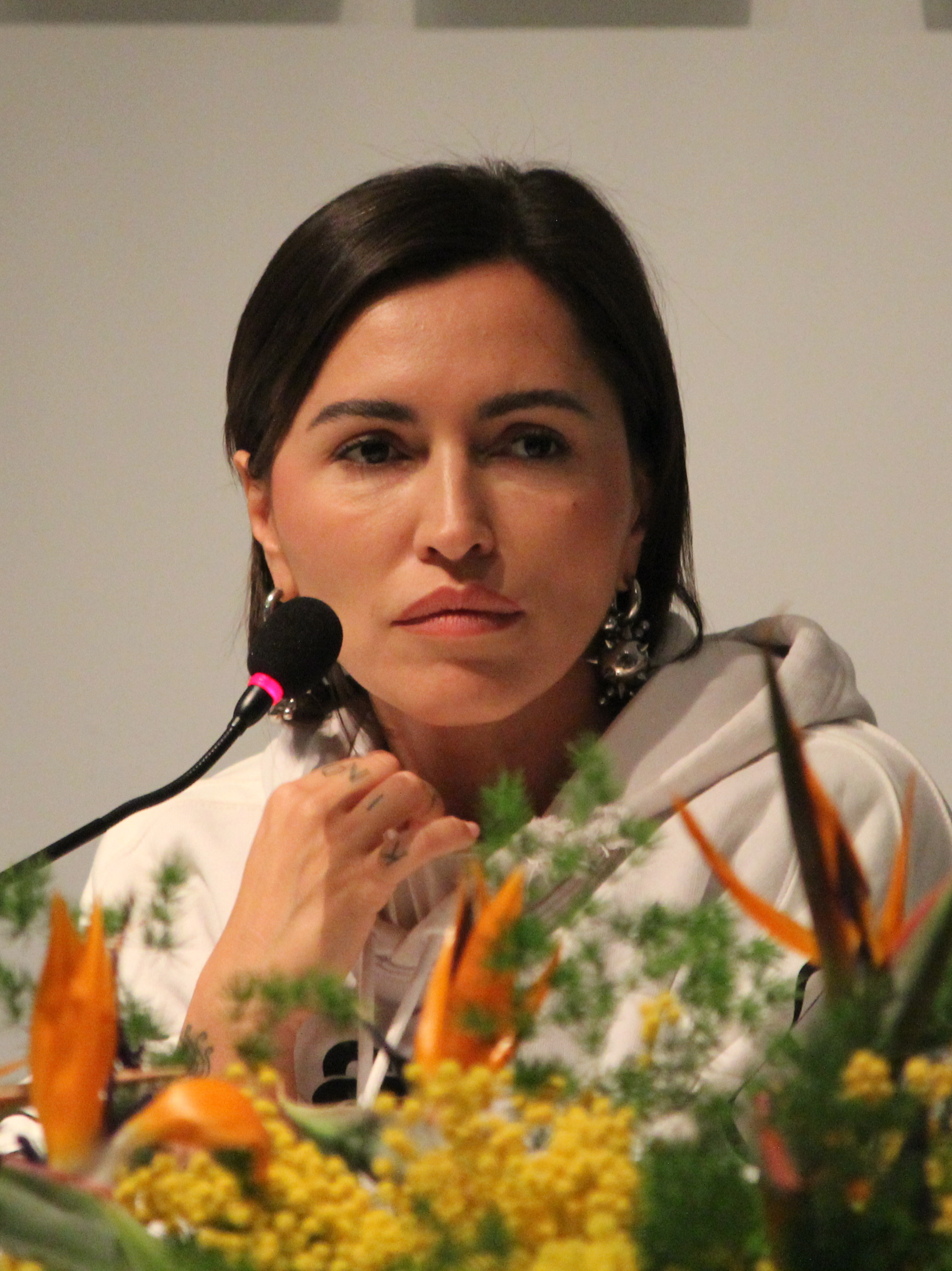
- Brancale at the Sanremo Music Festival 2026

Background information
- Born: 4 May 1989 (age 37); Bari, Apulia, Italy
- Genres: Pop; funk carioca; jazz
- Occupations: Singer; songwriter; multi-instrumentalist
- Instruments: Vocals; piano; keyboards
- Years active: 2011–present
- Labels: Warner; Atlantic; Isola degli Artisti
- Website: www.isoladegliartisti.it/serena-brancale-2/

Serena Brancale (Italian pronunciation: [seˈreːna braŋˈkaːle]; born 4 May 1989) is an Italian singer-songwriter and multi-instrumentalist.

== Early life ==
Brancale was born in Bari. Her father is a former footballer and her mother ran a music school. She has a sister, Nicole. Her mother introduced her to the violin and piano as a child. After studying advertising graphics at the Accademia di Belle Arti di Bari, Brancale received a degree in jazz singing from the Conservatory of Bari. At the age of 26, she moved to Rome.

== Career ==
In 2003, she played Annamaria in the film Mio cognato. She participated in the newcomers' section of the Sanremo Music Festival 2015 with her song "Galleggiare", which would also become the title track of her first studio album. She released two studio albums, Vita da artista and Je sò accussì in 2019 and 2022, respectively.

In February 2024, she released "Baccalà", a single in Barese dialect that went viral on TikTok in Italy. That April, she performed "Baccalà" with Annalisa at the latter's concert in Bari. She released two additional Barese-dialect singles in 2024: "La zia" and "Stu cafè". In December 2024, she was announced as one of the participants in the Sanremo Music Festival 2025. Her song, "Anema e core", was the first case of a Sanremo entry featuring Barese lyrics, and ultimately placed 24th. On 30 May 2025 she published "Serenata" in collaboration with Alessandra Amoroso.

On 30 November 2025, Brancale was announced among the participants of the Sanremo Music Festival 2026. She competed with the song "Qui con me", reaching 9th place and receiving three separate awards.

== Discography ==
=== Studio albums ===
Title	Details	Peak chart positions
Title	Details	ITA
Galleggiare	Release date: 25 February 2015; Label: Warner Music Italia; Formats: CD, digital download, streaming	—
Vita da artista	Release date: 10 May 2019; Label: Isola degli Artisti; Formats: LP, digital download, streaming	—
Je sò accussì	Release date: 25 March 2022; Label: Isola degli Artisti; Formats: LP, digital download, streaming	—
Sacro	Release date: 10 April 2026; Label: Atlantic Records Italy; Formats: LP, digital download, streaming	9

=== Live albums ===
Title	Details
Serena Brancale Live	Release date: 2011; Label: Self-released; Formats: CD

=== Singles ===
Title	Year	Peak chart positions	Certifications	Album
Title	Year	ITA	Certifications	Album
"Il gusto delle cose"	2013	—		Galleggiare
"La mia anima"	2013	—		Galleggiare
"Galleggiare"	2015	—		Galleggiare
"Pessime intenzioni" (featuring Ghemon)	2022	—		Je sò accussì
"Vieni a ballare in Puglia"	2022	—		Non-album singles
"Stù groove"	2022	—		Non-album singles
"Disordine" (with FIAT131)	2023	—		Non-album singles
"Andamento lento"	2023	—		Non-album singles
"Voglio di più" (with Clementino)	2023	—		Non-album singles
"L'altra metà" (with FIAT131)	2023	—		Non-album singles
"Baccalà" (with Dropkick_m)	2024	—		Sacro
"La zia" (with Dropkick_m)	2024	—		Sacro
"Stu cafè"	2024	—		Sacro
"Anema e core"	2025	10	FIMI: Platinum	Sacro
"Serenata" (with Alessandra Amoroso)	2025	3	FIMI: Platinum	Io non sarei and Sacro
"Qui con me"	2026	6		Sacro
"Bésame mucho" (featuring Gregory Porter and Delia)	2026	—		Sacro
"Al mio paese" (with Levante and Delia)	2026	3	FIMI: Platinum	Sacro
