= Anema e core (Serena Brancale song) =

Single by Serena Brancale

from the album Sacro
- Language: Italian; Neapolitan; Naples dialect; Bari dialect
- Released: 12 February 2025
- Genre: Jazz-funk; Latin pop; hyperpop; folktronica; world music; dance-pop
- Length: 2:46
- Label: Warner / ADA; Isola degli Artisti
- Composers: Serena Brancale; Federica Abbate; Jacopo Ettorre; Manuel Finotti; Nicola Lazzarin
- Lyricists: Serena Brancale; Federica Abbate; Jacopo Ettorre
- Producers: Carlo Avarello; Cripo; Gorbaciof

Serena Brancale singles chronology
"Stu cafè" (2024)	"Anema e core" (2025)	"Serenata" (2025)

Music video
- "Anema e core" on YouTube

"Anema e core" (Neapolitan: [ˈɑːnəm(ə) e kˈkɔːrə], Barese: [ˈɑːnəm(ə) e kˈkowrə]; transl. "Heart and Soul") is a song co-written and recorded by Italian singer-songwriter Serena Brancale, released on 12 February 2025 through Warner Music Italy and Isola degli Artisti. It competed in the Sanremo Music Festival 2025, finishing in 24th position.

The song marked the singer's return to the contest since her debut in the 2015 Newcomers' section, as well as the first case of a Sanremo entry featuring lyrics in Brancale's native Barese dialect. It is a stated homage to the late Neapolitan singer Pino Daniele, who Brancale says encouraged her to write music in her own dialect.

== Music video ==
The music video, directed by Manuel Amicucci, was released on 12 February 2025 on the singer's official YouTube channel.

== Charts ==
=== Weekly charts ===
Weekly chart performance for "Anema e core"
Chart (2025)	Peak position
Italy (FIMI)	10
Italy Airplay (EarOne)	41

=== Year-end charts ===
Year-end chart performance for "Anema e core"
Chart (2025)	Position
Italy (FIMI)	33

== Certifications ==
Certifications for "Anema e core"
Region	Certification	Certified units/sales
Italy (FIMI)	Platinum	200,000^{‡}
^{‡} Sales+streaming figures based on certification alone.
