= Alfonso (song) =

2013 debut single by Levante

Single by Levante

from the album Manuale distruzione
- Released: 15 May 2013
- Length: 3:32
- Label: INRI
- Songwriter: Levante

Levante singles chronology
"Alfonso" (2013)	"Memo" (2013)

Audio
- "Alfonso" on YouTube

"Alfonso" is the debut single of Italian singer-songwriter Levante. It was released in 2013.

== Background ==
The lyrics are based on Levante's autobiographical experiences. It was released by the indie-focused label Inri, marking the label's first single by a female artist.

For this song Levante was noted by Max Gazzè and chosen as opening act in his 2013 tour.

== Reception ==
First put in heavy rotation by Radio DeeJay, the single became a surprise hit and was certified gold. The song has been described as 'one of these songs that suddenly becomes famous and everyone sings without realizing, at times, that there's very little that's actually cheerful in the lyrics.'

Italian writer Vincenzo Rossini noted how the 'sudden and unexpected success confirms that, beyond its humorous tone, it has captured an irresolvable and widespread feeling of existential unease', and described Alfonso" as 'an effective depiction of a post-millennial obsession — the compulsion to socialize and the belief that personal fulfillment is possible only through social inclusion.'

== Track listing ==
No.	Title	Writer(s)	Length
1.	"Alfonso"	Levante	3:32

== Charts ==
Chart (2013)	Peak position
Italy (FIMI)	37
Italy Airplay (EarOne)	46

== Certifications ==
Region	Certification	Certified units/sales
Italy (FIMI)	Gold	25,000^{‡}
^{‡} Sales+streaming figures based on certification alone.
