= Cinque giorni =

Single by Michele Zarrillo

from the album Come uomo tra gli uomini
- B-side: "La notte dei pensieri"
- Released: 1994
- Length: 4:06
- Label: RTI Music
- Songwriters: Michele Zarrillo; Vincenzo Incenzo

Michele Zarrillo singles chronology
| "Strade di Roma" (1992) | "Cinque giorni" (1994) | "Ragazza d'argento" (1997) |

Audio
- "Cinque giorni" on YouTube

"Cinque giorni" (lit. 'Five days', also spelled "5 giorni") is a 1994 song composed by Michele Zarrillo and Vincenzo Incenzo and performed by Michele Zarrillo. One of Zarrillo's signature songs, it is the leading single of the album Come uomo tra gli uomini.

== Overview ==
The song recounts a painful breakup, with a man who was left five days before, and in desperation begs the woman to help him forget her. It was Zarrillo's entry for the 44th edition of the Sanremo Music Festival, where it ranked fifth. Initially Zarrillo was doubtful about the choice, as he feared to be labeled as too melodic and sentimental.

In 1997, Zarrillo recorded the song in Spanish as "Cinco días". Artists who covered the song include Laura Pausini, Fiorello, Richard Clayderman, Björgvin Halldórsson, and Will. In 2026, Zarrillo and Sal Da Vinci performed a new version of the song at the 76th Sanremo Music Festival.

== Track listing ==
- 7" single – RTI 0104 - 2
1. "Cinque giorni" (Zarrillo, Incenzo)
2. "La notte dei pensieri" (Luigi Albertelli, Luigi Lopez, Zarrillo)

== Certifications ==
| Region | Certification | Certified units/sales |
|---|---|---|
| Italy (FIMI) Sales from 2009 | Gold | 50,000^{‡} |
^{‡} Sales+streaming figures based on certification alone.
