= Giordana Angi =

French-Italian singer-songwriter and record producer (born 1994)

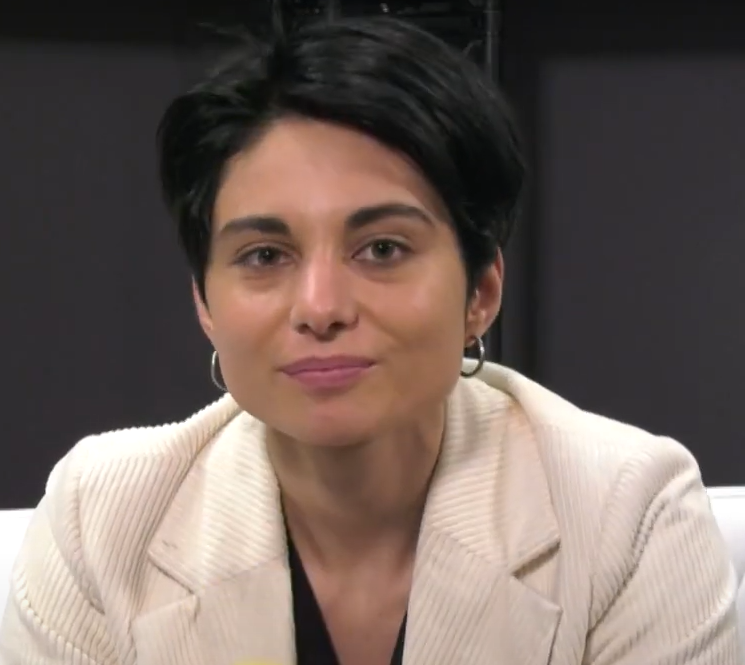
- Giordana Angi in February 2020

Background information
- Born: Giordana Angi; 12 January 1994 (age 32)
- Origin: Vannes, Morbihan, Brittany, France
- Genre: Pop
- Occupations: Singer-songwriter; record producer
- Instruments: Vocals; guitar; piano
- Years active: 2012–present
- Labels: Warner Music Italy (2012, 2024–present); Universal Music Italia (2019–2022); Virgin (2019–2021); Cherrytree (2022–present); Warner Records Italy (2025–present)

Giordana Angi (Italian pronunciation: [dʒorˈdaːna ˈandʒi]; born 12 January 1994) is a French-Italian singer-songwriter and record producer.

She debuted in the "Newcomers" section at the Sanremo Music Festival 2012 with the song "Incognita poesia". In 2019 she ended up second in the eighteenth edition of the Italian talent show Amici di Maria De Filippi.

In 2019 she signed a recording contract with Universal Music Italia, releasing two studio albums and several singles, including "Casa" and "Come mia madre", which she competed with at the Sanremo Music Festival 2020.

As a songwriter and lyricist she wrote songs for Nina Zilli, Tiziano Ferro, Alessandra Amoroso and Alberto Urso. In 2022, she founded 21co, a record label affiliated with Fascino PGT.

== Life and career ==
In 2012 Angi participated in the Sanremo Giovani's contest with the song "Incognita poesia".

In 2016 she released her first single "Chiusa con te (XXX)" for the label Sugar Music produced by Tiziano Ferro.

In 2018 she wrote the single sung in Sanremo by Nina Zilli, "Senza appartenere". In October 2018 Angi joined the talent show of Amici di Maria De Filippi, ranking in second place and winning the TIM Journalist Critics' Award. During Amici, she published numerous singles, later included in the EP, Casa, which debuted in second place in the FIMI chart and sold over 25,000 copies. The lead single, "Casa" peaked at number 44 of Italian Singles Chart and received the Gold certification.

On 11 October 2019 Angi published her first studio album, Voglio essere tua, became her first number one work on Fimi's chart, becoming the first woman to achieve this in 2019. The album tracks include the promotional single, "Stringimi più forte", certified Gold, and the collaboration "Oltre Mare" with Alberto Urso, winner of Amici. In 2019 she wrote songs with Tiziano Ferro, including "Accetto miracoli" and "Buona (cattiva) sorte", Alberto Urso and Carmen Ferreri.

After being the coach of Amici Celebrities, the celebrities version of Amici, on 31 December 2019 her participation in the Sanremo Music Festival was announced, with the song "Come mia madre", later peaking at number 55 of Italian Singles Chart.

In May 2020 she was selected for new talent show "Amici Speciali" with the single "Amami adesso". Her second studio album Mi muovo was published on 13 May 2020, and peaked at number 11 on Italian Album Chart. From the album were taken out as singles "Siccome sei", "Farfalle", and "Tuttapposto" with Loredana Bertè.

In 2020 she wrote the songs "0 passi" and "Mentre ti spoglio" by the 20th edition finalist of Amici di Maria De Filippi Deddy, supervising and producing part of his debut album. During the same year, she also wrote the song "Il nostro tempo" for Alessandra Amoroso's album Tutto accade. Angi also participated as a judge for the initial casting of the 21st edition of Amici di Maria De Filippi and collaborated throughout the program as a tutor and singing coach.

In 2022, she founded 21co, a record label, together with Mamo Giovenco, Emanuela Sempio, Gabriele Costanzo. singer Briga, and Fascino PGT. Angi serves as the label's A&r.

On April 18, 2025, Angi released the single "Strade". It was composed during the tour with Sting.

On October 31, 2025, she released the single "Dammi un bacio". On May 8, 2026, the single "Quando poi ci lasceremo" was released, followed on October 30 by the single "Piccole cose".

== Discography ==
=== Studio albums ===
Title	Album details	Peak chart positions	
Title	Album details	ITA	SWI
Voglio essere tua	Released: 11 October 2019; Label: Universal Music Italy, Virgin; Formats: CD, digital download	1	92
Mi muovo	Released: 13 May 2021; Label: Universal Music Italy, Virgin; Formats: CD, digital download	11	—
Questa fragile bellezza	Released: 28 October 2022; Label: Universal Music Italy, Virgin; Formats: CD, digital download	27	—

=== Extended plays ===
Title	EP details	Peak chart positions	Certifications
Title	EP details	ITA	Certifications
Casa	Released: 19 April 2019; Label: Universal Music Italy, Virgin; Formats: CD, digital download	2	FIMI: Gold

=== Singles ===
Song	Year	Peak positions	Certification	Album
Song	Year	ITA	Certification	Album
"Incognita poesia"	2012	—		Non-album singles
"Chiusa con te (XXX)"	2016	—		Non-album singles
"Casa"	2019	44	FIMI: Platinum	Casa
"Chiedo di non chiedere"	2019	—		Casa
"Stringimi più forte"	2019	58	FIMI: Gold	Voglio essere tua
"Come mia madre"	2020	55		Voglio essere tua
"Amami adesso"	2020	81		Mi muovo
"Siccome sei"	2020	—		Mi muovo
"Tuttapposto" (with Loredana Bertè)	2021	—		Mi muovo
"Farfalle colorate"	2021	—		Mi muovo
"Passeggero"	2021	—		Questa fragile bellezza
"Le cose che non dico"	2022	—		Questa fragile bellezza
"Un autunno fa"	2022	—		Questa fragile bellezza

== Authorship and songwriting ==
Year	Title	Artist	Album
2018	Senza appartenere(text and music: G. Angi, N. Zilli, A. Iammarino.)	Nina Zilli	Modern Art (Sanremo Edition)
2019	Più forti del ricordo(text and music: G. Angi, C. Avarello)	Carmen Ferreri	Più forti del ricordo
2019	Buona (cattiva) sorte(text and music: G. Angi, T. Ferro, A. Iammarino, Timbaland)	Tiziano Ferro	Accetto miracoli
2019	Accetto miracoli(text and music: G. Angi, T. Ferro, E. Dabbono, F. Vindver, Timbaland)	Tiziano Ferro	Accetto miracoli
2019	Seconda pelle (text and music: G.Angi, T. Ferro, A. Lopez, Timbaland)	Tiziano Ferro	Accetto miracoli
2019	Casa a Natale (text and music: G.Angi, T. Ferro, D. Tagliapietra)	Tiziano Ferro	Accetto miracoli
2019	Accanto a te (text and music: G. Angi, A. Urso, P. Perris)	Alberto Urso	Solo
2020	Solo con te (text and music: G. Angi, A. Urso, P. Perris)	Alberto Urso	Solo
2020	Geloso (text and music: G. Angi, W. Ricci, S. Vitale)	Francesco Bertoli	Carpe diem
2021	0 passi (text and music: G. Angi, E. Angi, Zef, Deddy)	Deddy	Il cielo contromano su Giove
2021	Mentre ti spoglio (text and music: G. Angi, C. Chiodo)	Deddy	Il cielo contromano su Giove
2021	Il nostro tempo (text and music: G. Angi, A. Iammarino, Dardust)	Alessandra Amoroso	Tutto accade
2022	Tienimi stanotte (text and music: G. Angi, L. Strangis, G. Cannarozzo)	Luigi Strangis	Strangis
2022	Dove sei (text and music: G. Angi, Sissi, R. Scirè)	Sissi	Leggera
2022	Non Siamo Soli (text and music: G. Angi, Alex W)	Alex Wyse	Non siamo soli

== Television programs ==
- Sanremo Giovani (Rai 1, 2012) – contestant
- Amici di Maria De Filippi (Canale 5, 2018–2019) – contestant – second place
- Amici Celebrities (Canale 5, 2019) – coach
- Sanremo Music Festival (Rai 1, 2020) – contestant
- Amici speciali (Canale 5, 2020) – contestant
