= Dedicato a te =

Single by Le Vibrazioni

from the album Le Vibrazioni
- B-side: "Dedicato a te (l'altra)"
- Released: 2003
- Genre: pop rock
- Length: 3:28
- Label: BMG Ricordi
- Songwriter(s): Francesco Sarcina
- Producer(s): Marco Guarnerio

Le Vibrazioni singles chronology
| "Dedicato a te" (2003) | "In una notte d'estate" (2003) |

Music video
- "Dedicato a te" on YouTube

"Dedicato a te" ('Dedicated to you') is an Italian song composed by Francesco Sarcina. It was the debut single of the Italian rock band Le Vibrazioni.

The song topped the Italian Singles charts for 14 weeks, selling over 100,000 copies and being certified platinum. The lyrics recount the real love story the lead singer Sarcina had in his twenties with a girl, Giulia.

A music video was shot in continuous take at Naviglio Pavese in Milan, and it stars the band and the actress Angelica Cacciapaglia as Giulia. The music video became viral, and spawned remakes and parodies, including the music videos of Elio e le storie tese's "Shpalman®" and Frankie Hi-NRG MC's "Chiedi chiedi". In 2020, the band released a new version of the song, known as "Dedicato a te – Acqua Version", which was used as theme song of the Canale 5 TV-series Il silenzio dell’acqua.

== Track listing ==
| No. | Title | Writer(s) | Length |
|---|---|---|---|
| 1. | "Dedicato a te" | Francesco Sarcina | 3:28 |
| 2. | "Dedicato a te (l'altra)" | Francesco Sarcina | 3:35 |

== Charts ==
Original version
| Chart (2003) | Peak position |
|---|---|
| Italy (FIMI) | 1 |
| Italy Airplay (Nielsen Music Control) | 1 |
