= Levante (singer) =

Italian singer-songwriter and novel writer (born 1987)

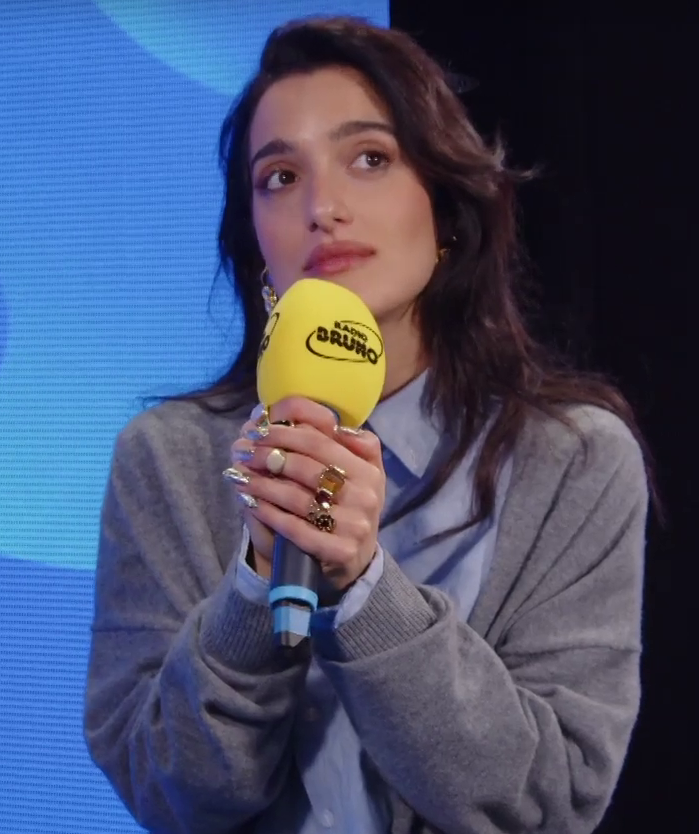
- Levante in February 2024

Background information
- Born: 23 May 1987 (age 39); Caltagirone, Sicily, Italy
- Genre: Indie pop
- Occupations: Singer; songwriter; novel writer
- Years active: 2013–present
- Labels: Carosello; Warner
- Website: levanteofficial.com

Claudia Lagona (born 23 May 1987), better known by her stage name Levante, is an Italian singer-songwriter and novel writer. She rose to fame in the 2010s, publishing four albums and several media success singles and collaborations, reaching the top ten on the Italian Albums Chart three times. She has written songs for several Italian artists and has collaborated with Gianni Morandi, Irene Grandi, Max Gazzè, The Kolors, J-Ax, Fedez, Tiziano Ferro and Carmen Consoli.

Levante has sold over 360,000 records in Italy and received a MTV Europe Music Award nomination and several Italian music achievements, including Premio Tenco, Academy Medimex and three participations at Sanremo Music Festival in 2020, 2023 and 2026. In 2019, Vogue included her in their "100 People Who Can Influence World Trends in Fashion and Art" list.

In 2017, she was chosen as a judge for the eleventh series of the Italian talent show X Factor. She has also written three novels.

== Career ==
She first signed a contract with A&A Recordings Publishing and Atollo Records, with whom she recorded the song "Troppodiva" under the name of Levante, but later left Turin to go to Leeds, UK. After coming back in Italy she opened for the concerts of Max Gazzè's Sotto casa Tour, on 11 March 2014 her first album Manuale distruzione was released, making its debut at number 8 on the Fimi Albums Chart. The album was subsequently awarded as Best First Work by the Academy Medimex. She extracts the singles "Cuori d'artificio" and "Duri come me", obtaining a fair success that allows her to receive a nomination at the MTV Europe Music Award as Best Italian Act and open the concerts of the Italian band Negramaro.

Levante participated in the 2015 edition of the South by Southwest festival in Texas, and also played in Los Angeles and New York City. In May 2015, the new album Abbi cura di te is released for Carosello Records, entering on the top20 of Italian Albums Chart. From the album Levante releases four singles published during the year will be extracted: "Ciao per sempre", "Till death do not separate us", "Abbi Cura di Te" and "Le lacrime non macchiano".

On 19 January 2017 is published the book written by Levante "Se non ti vedo non esisti", published by Rizzoli. On 1 February 2017 she releases the single "Non me interessa niente niente", which anticipates her third studio album Nel chaos di stanze stupefacenti, released on 7 April 2017, which reaching number two on Italian Albums Chart and is certified gold by Fimi. The singles "Non Me Ne Frega Niente" and "Pezzo di Me" feat Max Gazzè obtain the gold and platinum certification respectively. On 19 May 2017 she joined the cast of coaches and judges at the eleventh edition of the talent show X Factor as a judge together with Fedez, Manuel Agnelli and Mara Maionchi. In 2017 Levante wrote and composed the lyrics for the single from "Le parole che non dico mai" that Rita Bellanza presented on stage at X Factor; she also wrote a song for the new album by Gianni Morandi D'amore d'autore, entitled "Mediterraneo".

In the first months of 2018 the stages of Europe and Italy with the "Chaos in Europe and Chaos In Teatro tours" solding out on over 30 dates. In the summer of the same year she collaborated with Diplo and MØ on the single "Stay Open". On 13 November 2018, on the other hand, the second novel, " Questa è l'ultima volta che ti dimentico", which immediately reached the top ten sales in Italy. Also in November 2018 she collaborated with Stash on the J-Ax and Fedez hit "Assenzio", becoming the singer's first single to reach the first position in Italy and selling over 200,000 copies.

In 2019 she duets in the song "Un motivo maledetto" with Irene Grandi, one of the first hits of the Tuscan singer of 1994. The duet was included in her celebratory album Grandissimo. At the beginning of 2019, a report on the prestigious special issue of Vogue, the annual guide to the 100 people who can influence world trends in fashion and art, is dedicated to the artist. On 5 March 2019 she signed a contract with the major Warner Music Group, with whom she released her fourth album entitled Magmamemoria on 4 October, which debuted and peaked at number four on the FIMI sales charts. To anticipate the album, the singles "Andrà tutto bene", released on 5 April 2019 and "Lo stretto necessario", in duet with Carmen Consoli. On 27 September is released the third single "Bravi Tutti Voi". On 31 December 2019, her participation in the Sanremo Music Festival is announced with the song "Tikibombom". At the end of the festival the song became her second top10 single peaking at number eight.

On 4 December 2022, Levante's participation in the Sanremo Music Festival 2023 was announced. She competed with the song "Vivo". Also in 2023, she duettes with LP in "Wild".

On 30 November 2025, she was announced among the participants of the Sanremo Music Festival 2026. She competed with the song "Sei tu".

== Artistry and music influences ==
When Vogue included Levante in the "100 people who can influence world trends in fashion and art" list in 2019, Levante explained her writing process: "I found refuge from the pain of his loss in music" and "When I write, I put down whatever comes to me and flows out spontaneously. I am extremely descriptive and I discovered that through my writing, I am capable of delving under the surface of feelings and emotions so deeply that I can really connect with my readers' hearts. This is more difficult when it comes to writing songs, also because you don't have as much time to connect." She describes the current pop scene as "very chaotic," and she considers its madness as symbolic of everything else happening in the world. "I think it is a consequence of the period we are living in" she says.

Levante's music influences comes from Italian songwriter Carmen Consoli to American singer Alanis Morissette. In an interview by Grazia she cites Mina, Cristina Donà, Janis Joplin, Tori Amos and Kristina Train. She also explains "I'm not that stationary in the ratings. I really listen to everything, ranging in genres... Surely pop is my favorite, but I have a very high and cultured consideration of this genre. When I talk about pop, I also put Nirvana in the middle."

== Discography ==
=== Studio albums ===
List of albums, with selected chart positions and certifications
Title	Album details	Peak chart positions	Certifications
Title	Album details	ITA	Certifications
Manuale distruzione	Released: 11 March 2014; Label: INRI; Formats: CD, digital download	8	
Abbi cura di te	Released: 5 May 2015; Label: Carosello Records; Formats: CD, digital download	17	
Nel caos di stanze stupefacenti	Released: 7 April 2017; Label: Carosello Records; Formats: CD, digital download	2	FIMI: Gold
Magmamemoria	Released: 4 October 2019; Label: Warner Music Italy; Formats: CD, digital download	3	FIMI: Gold
Opera futura	Released: 16 February 2023; Label: Warner Music Italy; Formats: CD, digital download	6	
Dell'amore il fallimento e altri passi di danza	Released: 8 October 2026; Label: Warner Music Italy; Formats: CD, digital download	9	

=== Singles ===
Song	Year	Peak positions	Certification	Album
Song	Year	ITA	Certification	Album
"Alfonso"	2013	37	FIMI: Gold	Manuale distruzione
"La scatola blu"	2013	—		Manuale distruzione
"Sbadiglio"	2014	73		Manuale distruzione
"Duri come me"	2014	—		Manuale distruzione
"Ciao per sempre"	2015	37		Abbi cura di te
"Le lacrime non macchiano"	2015	—		Abbi cura di te
"Finché morte non ci separi"	2015	—		Abbi cura di te
"Abbi cura di te"	2016	—		Abbi cura di te
"Non me ne frega niente"	2017	91	FIMI: Gold	Nel caos di stanze stupefacenti
"Pezzo di me" (with Max Gazze)	2017	66	FIMI: Platinum	Nel caos di stanze stupefacenti
"Gesù Cristo sono io"	2017	—		Nel caos di stanze stupefacenti
"Assenzio" (J-Ax and Fedez featuring Stash and Levante)	2018	1	FIMI: 4× Platinum	Comunisti col Rolex (as a featured artist)
"Stay Open" (with Diplo and MØ)	2018	—		Non-album single
"Andrà tutto bene"	2019	78		Magmamemoria
"Lo stretto necessario" (with Carmen Consoli)	2019	97		Magmamemoria
"Bravi tutti voi"	2019	—		Magmamemoria
"Tikibombom"	2020	8	FIMI: Platinum	Magmamemoria
"Sirene"	2020	—		Non-album singles
"Vertigine" (with Altarboy)	2020	—	FIMI: Gold	Non-album singles
"Dall'alba al tramonto"	2021	—		Non-album singles
"Vivo"	2023	17	FIMI: Gold	Opera futura
"Canzone d'estate"	2023	—		Opera futura
"Mi manchi"	2024	—		Opera futura
"Maimai"	2025	—		Dell'amore il fallimento e altri passi di danza
"Niente da dire"	2025	—		Dell'amore il fallimento e altri passi di danza
"Dell'amore il fallimento"	2025	—		Dell'amore il fallimento e altri passi di danza
"Sono blu"	2025	—		Dell'amore il fallimento e altri passi di danza
"Sei tu"	2026	18		Dell'amore il fallimento e altri passi di danza
"I maschi" (featuring Gaia)	2026	100		Dell'amore il fallimento e altri passi di danza
"Al mio paese" (Serena Brancale with Levante and Delia)	2026	3	FIMI: Platinum	Sacro
"Malìa"	2026	—		Dell'amore il fallimento e altri passi di danza
"—" denotes items which were not released in that country or failed to chart.

== Author and songwriter for other singers ==
Collaborations authorship and / or compositions are listed in parentheses in the title.

Title	Year	Artist	Album
"Mediterraneo" (lyrics and music: Levante, Dario Faini)	2017	Gianni Morandi	D'amore D'autore
"Le parole che non dico mai" (lyrics and music: Levante, A. Bisi, A. Filippetti)	2017	Rita Bellanza	Non-album single
"In fondo non c'è" (lyrics and music: Levante, A. Filippelli, F. Martorelli)	2020	Elodie	This Is Elodie
"Ti porterai lontano"; "Te llevarás muy lejos"; (lyrics: Levante; muisc: Levante, A. Mariano)	2024	Laura Pausini	Anime Parallele; Almas paralelas

== Filmography ==
=== Films ===
Year	Title	Role(s)	Notes
2023	Romantic Girls	Herself	Cameo appearance
2024	Levante ventitré anni di voli pindarici	Herself	Documentary film

=== Television ===
Year	Title	Role(s)	Notes
2026	L'invisibile - La cattura di Matteo Messina Denaro	Maria Gambera	Miniseries

== Television ==
- X Factor, season 11, 2017 – coach and judge
- Sanremo Music Festival, 70th edition, 2020 – contestant
- Sanremo Music Festival, 73rd edition, 2023 – contestant
- Sanremo Music Festival, 76th edition, 2026 – contestant

== Modeling ==
- Model for Trussardi 's campaign #VisionaryElegance (2016)
- New face for TV spot by S'Agapoò Jewelry (2017)
- Testimonial for Huawei (2017)
- Testimonial for L'Oréal (2018–present)
- Model for Prada (2019)
- Model and testimonial for Diadora (2019–present)
- Testimonial for Yves Saint Laurent Beauty (2020–present)

== Authored book ==
- Se non ti vedo non esisti. Milan, Rizzoli Libri. 2017.
- Questa è l'ultima volta che ti dimentico. Milan. Rizzoli Libri. 2018.
