= Sacro (album) =

Studio album by Serena Brancale
- Released: 10 April 2026
- Genres: Folk-pop; Latin pop; baile funk; world music
- Length: 44:15
- Labels: Atlantic; Warner Italy
- Producers: Serena Brancale; Bnjmn; Carlo Avarello; Cripo; Dropkick_m; Fabio Barnaba; Gorbaciof; Itaca; Richard Bona

Serena Brancale chronology
Je sò accusì (2022)	Sacro (2026)

Singles from Sacro
- 1. "Baccalà" Released: 7 February 2024; 2. "La zia" Released: 10 May 2024; 3. "Stu cafè" Released: 21 June 2024; 4. "Anema e core" Released: 12 February 2025; 5. "Serenata" Released: 30 May 2025; 6. "Qui con me" Released: 25 February 2026; 7. "Bésame mucho" Released: 28 February 2026; 8. "Al mio paese" Released: 3 April 2026

Sacro (Italian: [ˈsaːkro]; Sacred) is the fourth studio album by the Italian singer-songwriter Serena Brancale, released on 10 April 2026 through Atlantic Records and Warner Music Italy.

The album includes the singles "Anema e core" and "Qui con me", which serve as Brancale's entries for the Sanremo Music Festival 2025 and Sanremo Music Festival 2026, respectively.

== Composition ==
The album features sixteen tracks, written and composed by the singer-songwriter herself in collaboration with songwriters and producers, including Jacopo Ettorre, Alessandro La Cava, Federica Abbate, Manuel Finotti, Massimiliano Marchio and the production duo Merk & Kremont. The project features several collaborations with other artists, including Alborosie, Alessandra Amoroso, Delia, Gregory Porter, Levante, Omara Portuondo, Richard Bona and Sayf. In an interview with Il Fatto Quotidiano, the singer-songwriter explained the choice of the project’s title Sacro:

"Sacro because it contains so many very important tracks; because it’s a project that began four years ago with extensive research into the local dialect, folklore, and songs like "Baccalà", "La zia’ and "Stu cafè". Sacro because it tells the story of my family, which simply had to be included. Sacred because there’s a track I wrote with my sister, which, incidentally, I left in its raw form without even going into the studio to record it. Sacred because there’s also a jazz-inspired approach to music, blending genres in a slightly more international way. So for me it’s sacred because it’s given me a way to always feel like myself on stage, on tour, on the Sanremo stage"

== Track listing ==
Sacro track listing
No.	Title	Lyrics	Music	Producer(s)	Length
1.	"Maria"	Serena Brancale	Brancale; Manuel Finotti	Carlo Avarello; Gorbaciof	2:16
2.	"Serenata" (with Alessandra Amoroso)	Brancale; Alessandra Amoroso; Alessandro La Cava; Federica Abbate	Eugenio Maimone; Federico Mercuri; Giordano Cremona	Avarello; Gorbaciof; ITACA	3:08
3.	"Anema e core"	Brancale; Jacopo Ettorre; Abbate	Brancale; Ettorre; Abbate; Finotti; Nicola Lazzarin	Avarello; Gorbaciof; Cripo	2:46
4.	"Qui con me"	Brancale; Alfredo Bruno; Noemi Bruno; Salvatore Mineo	Brancale; A. Bruno; Avarello; Fabio Barnaba	Avarello; Barnaba	3:16
5.	"Al mio paese" (with Levante and Delia)	Brancale; Claudia Lagona; Delia Buglisi; La Cava; Abbate	Brancale; La Cava; Abbate; Finotti; Simone Capurro	Avarello; Gorbaciof; Antonio Filippelli^{[v]}	3:17
6.	"La zia" (with Dropkick_m)	Brancale	Brancale; Finotti; Massimiliano Marchio	Dropkick_m	2:18
7.	"Solo un'ora" (featuring Sayf and Gregory Porter)	Brancale; Adam Sayf Viacava; Gregory Porter; Avarello	Brancale; Avarello; Marco Bottoni	Avarello; Bnjmn	2:37
8.	"Stu cafè"	Brancale	Avarello; Finotti	Avarello; Gorbaciof	2:56
9.	"Fuera"	Brancale; Laura Di Lenola	Brancale; Di Lenola; Finotti	Avarello; Gorbaciof	2:49
10.	"Gitana" (featuring Richard Bona)	Brancale; A. Bruno	Brancale; A. Bruno; Bona Pinder Yayumayalolo	Richard Bona	2:45
11.	"Bésame mucho" (with Gregory Porter and Delia)	Consuelo Velázquez	Velázquez	Avarello; Barnaba; Gorbaciof	3:27
12.	"Capatosta" (featuring Alborosie)	Brancale; Alberto D'Ascola	Brancale; D'Ascola; Finotti; Marchio	Dropkick_m; Gorbaciof	2:30
13.	"Baccalà" (with Dropkick_m)	Brancale; Marchio	Brancale; Finotti; Marchio	Dropkick_m	2:01
14.	"Magic Puglia"	Brancale; Di Lenola	Brancale; Finotti; Marchio	Dropkick_m; Gorbaciof	1:59
15.	"Aquello" (featuring Omara Portuondo and Pamela)	Fabrizio Mocata; Santiago Larramendi	Mocata; Larramendi	Avarello; Barnaba	4:20
16.	"Bariamore"	Brancale; Nicole Brancale	Brancale; N. Brancale	Brancale	1:50
Total length:					44:15

=== Note ===
- ^{^[v]} indicates a vocal producer

== Personnel ==
Credits are adapted from Tidal.

=== Musicians ===
- Serena Brancale – vocals (all tracks), piano (track 1)
- Manuel Finotti – drum programming (1, 3, 11), synthesizer programming (1, 3, 12), programming (5, 9, 14), bass programming (11), synthesizer (14), guitar (16)
- Andrea Braido – bass, guitar (1, 9)
- Daniele Raimondi – trumpet (1)
- Carlo Avarello – programming (2, 4), guitar (3, 9, 11), acoustic guitar (5), piano (15)
- Gorbaciof – programming (2)
- Itaca – programming (2)
- Franco Notarberardino – bass (3)
- Cripo – drum programming (3)
- Alessandro Canini – drums, electric guitar (4, 7); electric bass (4), bass (7), percussion (7)
- Fabio Barnaba – programming (4, 15, 16); piano, synthesizer (4); strings programming (11)
- Antonio Filippelli – programming (5)
- Delia – vocals (5, 11)
- Pietro Giola – trumpet (5)
- Levante – vocals (5)
- Dropkick_m – instrumentation (6, 13), synthesizer (12, 14), drum programming (12), programming (14)
- Gregory Porter – vocals (7, 11)
- Sayf – vocals (7)
- Richard Bona – vocals, bass, guitar, programming (10)
- Alborosie – vocals (12)
- Omara Portuondo – vocals (15)
- Pamela – vocals (15)
- Corinne Ragona – chorus vocals (16)
- Giordana Nausica – chorus vocals (16)
- Giulia Gentile – violin (16)
- Agnese Antonelli – viola (16)
- Livia De Romanis – cello (16)

=== Technical ===
- Manuel Finotti – engineering (1–3, 5, 7, 9, 11, 12, 15), mixing (1–3, 5, 9–12, 14, 15), mastering (16)
- Itaca – engineering (2)
- Antonio Filippelli – engineering (5)
- Gianmarco Manilardi – engineering (5)
- Richard Bona – engineering, mixing (10)
- Jim Clinco – engineering (16)
- Alessandro Canini – mixing, mastering (3, 4, 7); engineering (4, 7)
- Pietro Caramelli – mastering (1, 2, 5, 9–12, 14, 15)

== Charts ==
Chart performance for Sacro
Chart (2026)	Peak position
Italian Albums (FIMI)	9

== Certifications ==
Certifications for Sacro
Region	Certification	Certified units/sales
Italy (FIMI)	Gold	25,000^{‡}
^{‡} Sales+streaming figures based on certification alone.
