= Serenata (Serena Brancale and Alessandra Amoroso song) =

Single by Serena Brancale and Alessandra Amoroso

from the album Io non sarei and Sacro
- Released: 30 May 2025
- Genre: Pop; folk; dance
- Length: 2:46
- Label: Warner Music Italy; Isola degli Artisti
- Songwriters: Serena Brancale; Alessandra Amoroso; Alessandro La Cava; Federica Abbate; Eugenio Maimone; Federico Mercuri; Giordano Cremona
- Producers: Carlo Avarello; Gorbaciof; ITACA

Serena Brancale singles chronology
| "Anema e core" (2025) | "Serenata" (2025) | "Qui con me" (2026) |

Alessandra Amoroso singles chronology
| "Cose stupide" (2025) | "Serenata" (2025) |

Music video
- "Serenata" on YouTube

"Serenata" (transl. "Serenade") is a song co-written and recorded by Italian singers Serena Brancale and Alessandra Amoroso. It was released on 30 May 2025 through Warner Music Italy and Isola degli Artisti as the sixth single from Amoroso's eighth studio album, Io non sarei.

== Background and composition ==
At the 2025 Sanremo Music Festival, where Serena Brancale participated in the competition with the song "Anema e core", Alessandra Amoroso was cast to reinterpret with Brancale the song "If I Ain't Got You" by Alicia Keys on the fourth night dedicated to covers. In April, the press released some rumours about a possible collaboration between the two artists.

The song, written by both artists with Alessandro La Cava and Federica Abbate, is produced by Carlo Avarello, Gorbaciof and ITACA, a team founded by the musical duo Merk & Kremont, and anticipated the release of Alessandra Amoroso's album Io non sarei, due out on 13 June 2025.

== Critics reception ==
Alessandro Alicandri of TV Sorrisi e Canzoni wrote that the song presents the union of several musical genres, with references to flamenco, sirtaki and the popular song of Southern Italy, finding it for this reason "far from the typical summer pop productions of recent years, with a story as exciting as a romantic comedy", and considering the vocal encounter of the two artists to be "balanced".

In a less positive review, Alvise Salerno of All Music Italia stated that the song was a remake of "Ciclone" by Takagi & Ketra and Elodie, asking "why lapse into citationism when you have a beautiful artistic maturity behind you, proven experience and technical material to do different things? Why not exploit being Apulian to the full?".

== Music video ==
The music video, directed by Marco Braia, was released in conjunction with the track's release.

== Charts ==
=== Weekly charts ===
Weekly chart performance for "Serenata"
| Chart (2025) | Peak position |
|---|---|
| Italy (FIMI) | 3 |
| Italy Airplay (EarOne) | 3 |

=== Year-end charts ===
Year-end chart performance for "Serenata"
| Chart (2025) | Position |
|---|---|
| Italy (FIMI) | 32 |

== Certifications ==
Certifications for "Serenata"
| Region | Certification | Certified units/sales |
|---|---|---|
| Italy (FIMI) | Platinum | 200,000^{‡} |
^{‡} Sales+streaming figures based on certification alone.
