= Michele Zarrillo =

Italian singer-songwriter (born 1957)

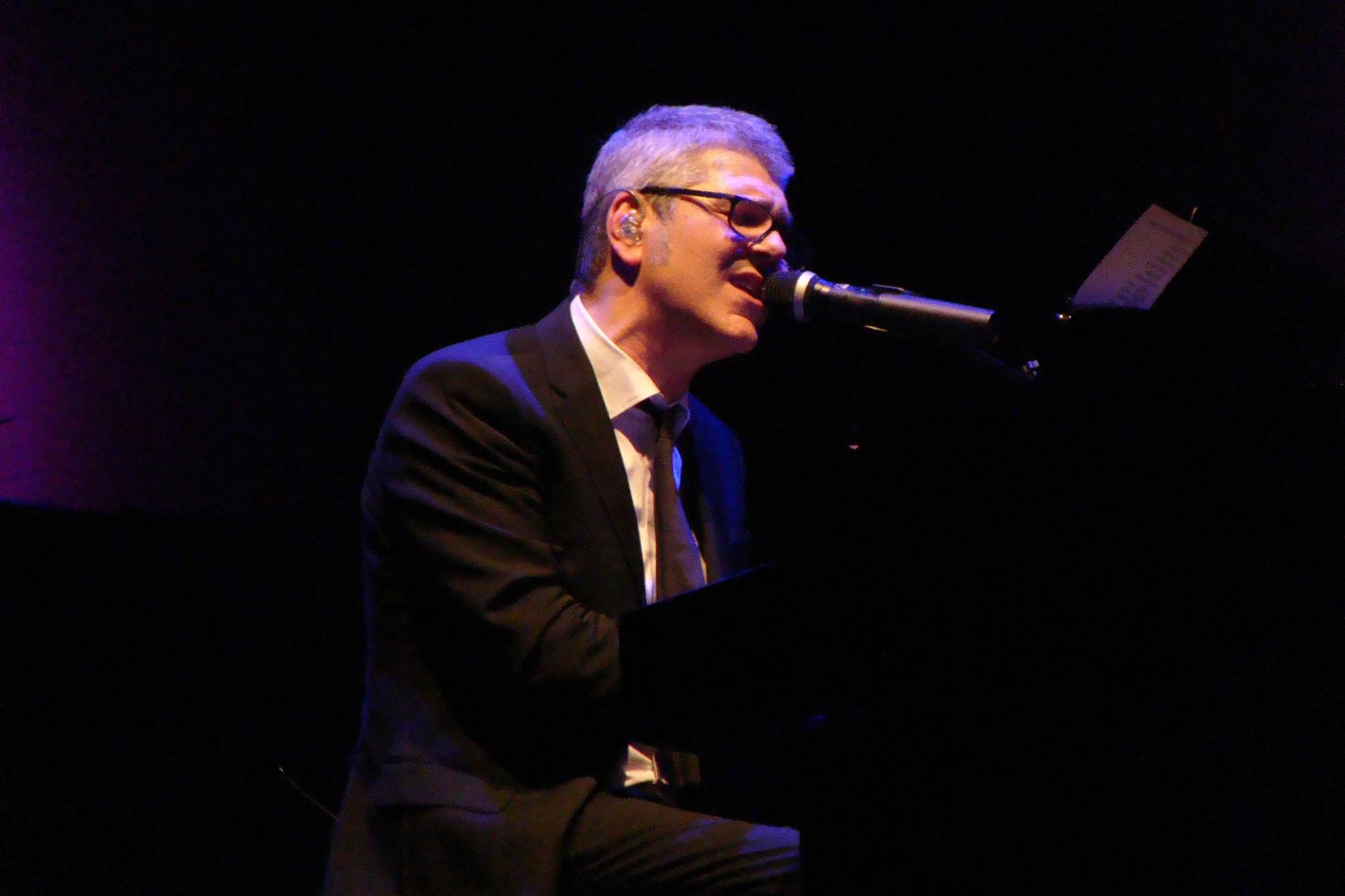
- Michele Zarrillo performing in 2013

Background information
- Born: 13 June 1957 (age 69); Rome, Italy
- Genres: Pop
- Occupation: Singer-songwriter
- Instruments: Vocals, guitar
- Years active: 1972–present
- Labels: Aris, CBS, Fonit Cetra, RTI Music, Sony Music
- Website: michelezarrillo.it

Michele Zarrillo (born 13 June 1957) is an Italian singer-songwriter. He is mainly known for hits such as "Una rosa blu" (A blue rose), "Cinque giorni" (Five days), L'elefante e la farfalla (The elephant and the butterfly) and "La notte dei pensieri" (The night of thoughts). In 1987 he won the Sanremo Music Festival, competing in the newcomers' section with "La notte dei pensieri". Zarrillo took part in the competition several other times, the last time in 2020 with the song "Nell'estasi o nel fango". He took part in Sanremo's competition 13 times, but only won once, as stated above.

As a songwriter, he penned songs for several artists, including Ornella Vanoni and Renato Zero.

== Biography ==
Zarrillo debuted as a musician in the 1970s, when he started playing guitar in the band Semiramis. In 1973, the band released the album Dedicato a Frazz. Meanwhile, he wrote songs for popular Italian artists, including Ornella Vanoni and Renato Zero.

In 1981, Zarrillo competed as a soloist at the Sanremo Music Festival performing the song "Su quel pianeta libero". The following year he competed for a second time singing "Una rosa blu", but was eliminated on the first night of the show. The song was re-released in 1997 and become a hit in Italy. "Una rosa blu" was also included in Zarrillo's debut album, Sarabanda, released in 1982.

In 1987, Zarrillo competed for the third time at the Sanremo Music Festival, finishing first in the newcomers' section with the song, "La notte dei pensieri". His second studio album, Soltanto amici, was released in 1988. Adesso followed in 1992. Most of the songs included in the album were co-written by Vincenzo Incenzo, who collaborated with Zarrillo on most of his following albums. Once again, the album was launched after competing in the Sanremo Music Festival of the same year, with the song "Strade di Roma".

In 1994, Zarrillo released the single "Cinque giorni", which placed fifth in the 44th Sanremo Music Festival and became one of his best-known songs, receiving strong airplay in the weeks following its release. The song was also included in Zarrillo's third studio album, Come uomo tra gli uomini. Two years later, Zarrillo released the album "L'elefante e la farfalla", including the song with the same title, performed during the Sanremo Music Festival, 1996.

In 1997, Zarrillo released his first compilation album, L'amore vuole amore, which was a commercial success, being certified platinum five times by the Federation of the Italian Music Industry for domestic sales exceeding 500,000 units. A Spanish-language version of the album was also released in Spain, where "Cinco Dias" was released as a single.

In 2001 and 2002, Zarrillo entered the Sanremo Music Festival again with the song "L'acrobata", which finished fourth in 2001 and was included in the albums Il vincitore non-c'è and Gli angeli, respectively.

In 2003, Zarrillo released the album Liberosentire, followed by L'alfabeto degli amanti in 2006, preceded by the single with the same title, which competed once again in the Sanremo Music Festival. Zarrillo's eleventh participation in the Sanremo Music Festival was in 2008, when he performed the song "L'ultimo film insieme", featured on the compilation album Nel tempo e nell'amore.

On 20 September 2011, Zarrillo released the album Unici al mondo, preceded by the single "La prima cosa che farò" and promoted through a concert tour in Italy.

In February 2017, Zarrillo participated at the Sanremo Music Festival, where he sang "Mani nelle mani". (Mani nelle mani means "Hands in the hands"). His final position in the competition is 11th. During Sanremo's competition, his new album of unprecedented songs "Vivere e rinascere" (that means "To Live and to be Reborn") was released. A tour followed and promoted the album.

He participated at the Sanremo Music Festival 2020 with the song "Nell'estasi o nel fango".

== Discography ==
=== Studio albums ===
- Sarabanda (1982)
- Soltanto amici (1988)
- Adesso (1992)
- Come uomo tra gli uomini (1994)
- L'elefante e la farfalla (1996)
- Il vincitore non-c'è (2001)
- Liberosentire (2003)
- L'alfabeto degli amanti (2006)
- Unici al mondo (2011)
- Vivere e Rinascere (2017)

=== Compilation albums ===
- L'amore vuole amore (1997)
- Nel tempo e nell'amore (2008)
- Le mie canzoni (2011)

=== Live albums ===
- Le occasioni dell'amore (2002)
- Michele Zarrillo Live – Roma (2009)
