= Riki (singer) =

Italian singer-songwriter

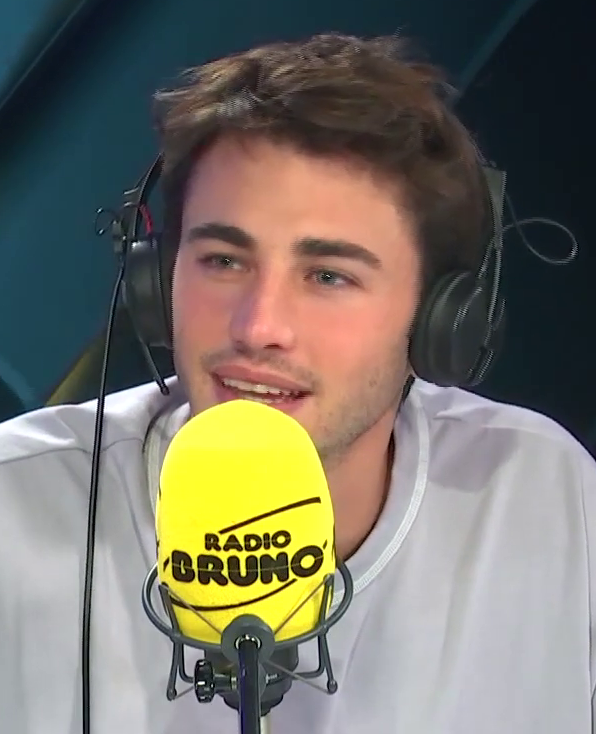

Background information
- Born: Riccardo Marcuzzo; 4 February 1992 (age 34)
- Genres: Pop
- Occupations: Singer; songwriter
- Years active: 2017–present
- Label: Sony Music

Riccardo Marcuzzo (born 4 February 1992), better known as Riki, is an Italian singer and songwriter who rose to fame after finishing as runner-up on the sixteenth season of the Italian talent show Amici di Maria De Filippi.

== Early life and career ==
Marcuzzo was born in Segrate, but since childhood he lives in Pessano con Bornago, in the province of Milan. From a young age he took up an interest in acting, taking part in several courses, but later he realised that it was not the right path for him; For this reason he decided to approach music and at seventeen he started taking singing lessons. In 2016, he took part in the sixteenth season of the Italian talent show Amici di Maria De Filippi. He finished as runner-up behind dancer Andreas Muller. While participating on Amici di Maria De Filippi, he signed with the record label Sony Music Italy.

On 5 May 2017 he released the lead single from his debut EP of the same name, Perdo le parole. It peaked at no. 11 on the Italian FIMI Singles Chart. The EP was later released on 19 May 2017 and debuted atop the Italian Albums Chart. After two weeks on the chart it was certified Gold.

In September 2017 he released an interview in an Italian Magazine, TV Sorrisi e Canzoni, about his new album and his first tour. On 29 September 2017 he released "Se parlassero di noi", the lead single from his upcoming album "Mania", which was released on 20 October 2017.

He participated at the Sanremo Music Festival 2020 with the song "Lo sappiamo entrambi" ("We both know"), finishing last.

== Discography ==
=== Albums ===
List of studio albums, with chart positions and certifications
Title	Album details	Peak chart positions		Certifications
Title	Album details	ITA	SWI	Certifications
Mania	Released: 20 October 2017; Label: Sony Music Italy; Formats: CD, download, streaming	1	44	FIMI: 2× Platinum
Popclub	Released: 04 September 2020; Label: Sony Music Italy; Formats: CD, download, streaming	2		

=== EP ===
List of studio albums, with chart positions and certifications
Title	EP details	Peak chart positions		Certifications
Title	EP details	ITA	SWI	Certifications
Perdo le parole	Released: 19 May 2017; Label: Sony Music Italy; Formats: CD, download, streaming	1	15	FIMI: 3× Platinum

=== Singles ===
List of singles, with chart positions and certifications, showing year released and album name
Single	Year	Peak chart positions		Certifications	Album or EP
Single	Year	ITA	ARG	Certifications	Album or EP
"Perdo le parole"	2017	11	—	FIMI: Platinum (2)	Perdo le parole
"Polaroid"	2017	42	—	FIMI: Platinum	Perdo le parole
"Balla con me"	2017	98	—		Perdo le parole
"Se parlassero di noi"	2017	4	—	FIMI: Platinum	Mania
"Aspetterò lo stesso"	2017	—	—		Mania
"Tremo (Dolce Vita)"	2018	59	—		Mania
"Dolor de cabeza" (featuring CNCO)	2018	43	90		Live & Summer Mania
"Resulta" (with Reik)	2019	—	—		Non-album single
"Gossip"	2019	—	—		Popclub
"Lo sappiamo entrambi"	2020	47	—		Popclub
"Litighiamo"	2020	—	—		Popclub

==== As featured artist ====
Title	Year	Peak chart positions	Certifications	Album
Title	Year	ITA	Certifications	Album
"Sbagliato" (Lowlow featuring Riki)	2018	19		TBA

=== Other charted songs ===
List of other charted songs, with chart positions and certifications, showing year released and album name
Single	Year	Peak chart positions	Certifications	Album or EP
Single	Year	ITA	Certifications	Album or EP
"Sei mia"	2016	28	FIMI: Gold	Perdo le Parole
"Diverso"	2017	78		Perdo le Parole
"Ti luccicano gli occhi"	2017	94		Perdo le Parole
