= Junior Cally =

Italian rapper

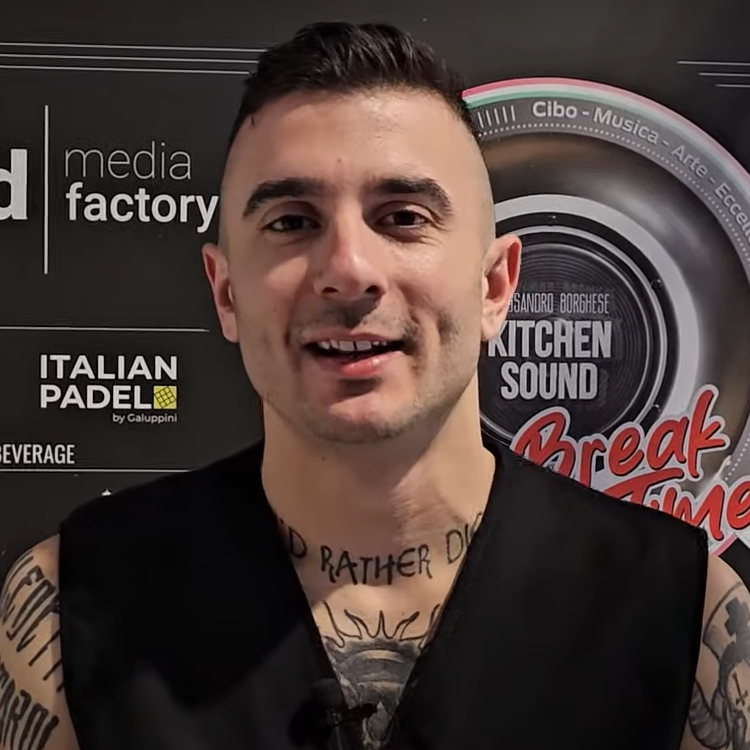
- Junior Cally in 2024

Background information
- Born: Antonio Signore; 10 October 1991 (age 34); Rome, Lazio, Italy
- Genres: Hip hop
- Occupation: Rapper
- Years active: 2017–present
- Labels: Sugar Music (2017–2019); Sony Music (2019–present)

Junior Cally, pseudonym of Antonio Signore (born 10 October 1991) is an Italian rapper. Junior Cally owes its name to a Jamaican reggae singer, Junior Kelly, who has always been "against" the political establishment of his country.

He debuted in 2017 with the single "Alcatraz" and his first album titled Ci entro dentro was released on 2 November 2018.

Junior Cally participated at the Sanremo Music Festival 2020 with the song "No grazie".

== Biography ==
The little information about his adolescence is revealed to us in his book Il principe. He writes that he was diagnosed with leukemia at the age of 15, but which marked him to the point of later manifesting obsessive-compulsive personality disorder.

Junior Cally has admitted to abusing alcohol at age 20 only to realize he had to take his life in hand and change it: "I told myself do something, live your life better. I tried to make up for lost time".

He found considerable success after the episode that occurred on September 4, 2019, in the video clip of the single "Tutti con me", which anticipated the release of his second album Wanted, released on September 6, 2019. In the first scenes of the music video, the Roman rapper, always known with a gas mask on his face, he decided after two years of career, to reveal his identity by showing himself to the public.

== Discography ==
=== Studio albums ===
- 2018 – Ci entro dentro
- 2019 – Ricercato

=== EP ===
- 2012 – Dalla strada al palco osceno (as Socio)
- 2013 – Punto di partenza (as Socio)

=== Singoli ===
- 2017 – Alcatraz
- 2017 – Guantanamo
- 2017 – Arkham
- 2017 – Pussy
- 2017 – Regola 1
- 2017 – Regola 50
- 2017 – Cally Whale
- 2017 – Strega
- 2017 – Magicabula
- 2018 – Quando arrivo io (feat. Gabry Ponte)
- 2018 – Wannabe (feat. Highsnob)
- 2018 – Capelli rossi
- 2018 – Valzer
- 2018 – Bulldozer
- 2019 – Wannabe vol. 2 (feat. Highsnob)
- 2019 – Montecarlo
- 2019 – Tutti con me
- 2019 – Sigarette
- 2020 – No grazie
- 2020 – Wannabe vol.3 (feat. Highsnob, Enzo Dong)
- 2021 – Amore di mezzo
- 2021 – Come Monet
