= Anastasio (singer) =

Italian singer and rapper (born 1997)

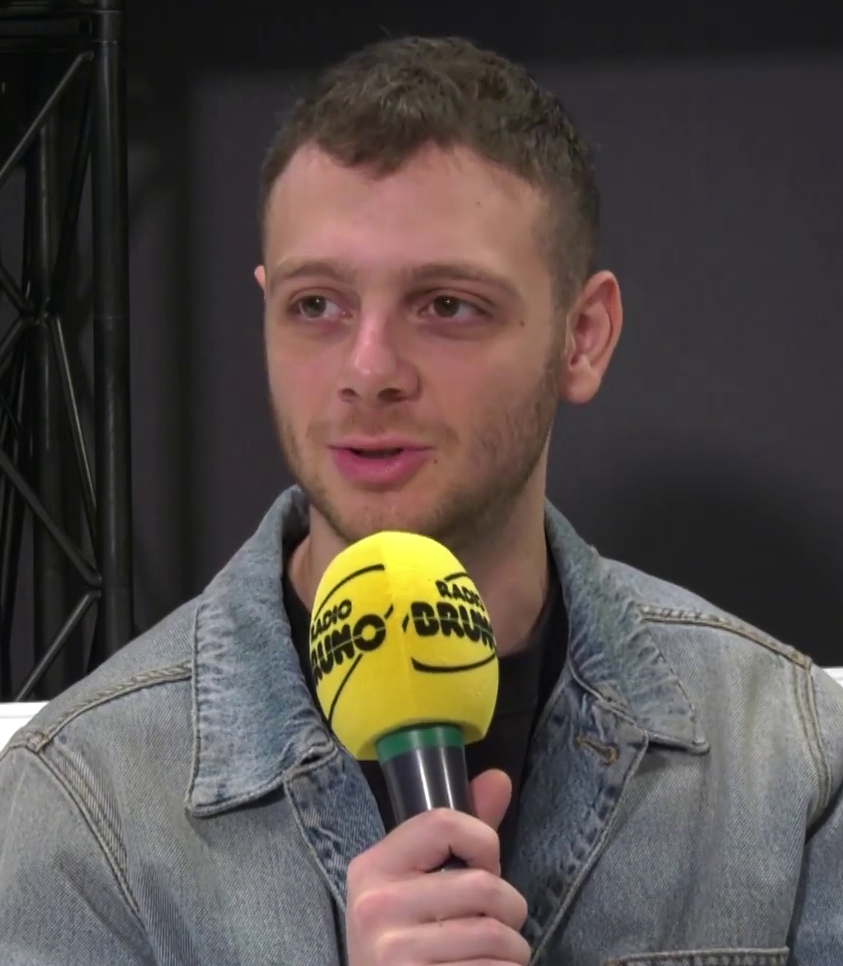

Background information
- Born: Marco Anastasio; 13 May 1997 (age 29); Meta, Campania, Italy
- Genres: Hip hop, rap rock, alternative hip hop, conscious hip-hop
- Occupations: Singer, rapper
- Years active: 2015–present
- Label: Sony Music (2018–present)

Marco Anastasio known as Anastasio (born 13 May 1997) is an Italian rapper and singer. He was born in Meta, Campania, a town near Naples. He is best known for winning the twelfth season of the Italian talent show X Factor in 2018. His debut single, "La fine del mondo", was released on 23 November 2018 and topped the charts in Italy.

== Early life and education ==
Marco Anastasio was born in 1997 in Meta, Campania. He attended a classical lyceum and later graduated in 2024 in Agricultural, Forestry and Environmental Sciences from the University of Naples Federico II.

== Career ==
=== 2015-2018: Early recordings ===
Anastasio published his first EP Disciplina sperimentale produced by Gigi Emme in 2015 and he also uploaded some singles on his YouTube channel using the pseudonym Nasta. On 20 March 2018 he published the song "Come Maurizio Sarri" dedicated to Maurizio Sarri the former coach of the professional football club S.S.C. Napoli. The song was successful, especially among football fans.

=== 2018–2020: X Factor Italia, Sanremo 2020 and debut album ===
Anastasio won the twelfth edition of the Italian version of the X Factor in December 2018. On 23 November 2018 his debut single "La fine del mondo" was released and it topped the charts in Italy winning a Gold Certification. On 14 December 2018 his EP La fine del mondo was released on Spotify.

On 8 February 2019 he appeared as a musical guest during the fourth show of the 69th Sanremo Music Festival, performing the song "Correre", which followed a monologue by actor and presenter Claudio Bisio. The song was released as a digital single on 9 February 2019.

He competed at the Sanremo Music Festival 2020 with the song "Rosso di rabbia". On 7 February 2020, he released his debut album Atto zero.

== Discography ==
=== Studio albums ===
List of studio albums, with details and chart positions
Title	Album details	Peak chart positions
Title	Album details	ITA
Atto zero	Released: 7 February 2020; Label: RCA Records; Format: CD, digital download, streaming	10
Mielemedicina	Released: 25 February 2022; Label: Epic, Sony Music; Format: digital download, streaming	95
Le macchine non possono pregare	Released: 11 April 2025; Label: Woodworm, Universal; Format: CD, LP, digital download, streaming	93
"—" denotes an item that did not chart in that country.

=== Extended plays ===
List of extended plays, with chart positions and certifications
Title	EP details	Peak chart positions	Certifications
Title	EP details	ITA	Certifications
Disciplina sperimentale (as Nasta MC)	Released: 14 March 2015; Label: Self-production; Format: digital download	—	
La fine del mondo	Released: 14 December 2018; Label: Sony Music; Format: CD, digital download	8	FIMI: Gold
"—" denotes an item that did not chart in that country.

=== Singles ===
List of singles, with chart positions, album name and certifications
Single	Year	Peak chart positions	Certifications	Album or EP
Single	Year	ITA	Certifications	Album or EP
"La fine del mondo"	2018	1	FIMI: 2× Platinum	La fine del mondo
"Correre"	2019	59		Non-album single
"Il fattaccio del vicolo del Moro"	2019	—		Atto zero
"Rosso di rabbia"	2020	15		Atto zero
"Assurdo"	2022	—		Mielemedicina
"E invece"	2022	—		Mielemedicina
"A-profitto"	2023	—		Non-album singles
"Una cosa semplice"	2025	—		Non-album singles
"—" denotes an item that did not chart in that country.

Awards and achievements
Preceded by Lorenzo Licitra	Italian X Factor; Winner; 2018	Succeeded by Sofia Tornambene
