= Paolo Jannacci =

Italian singer, pianist and composer (born 1972)

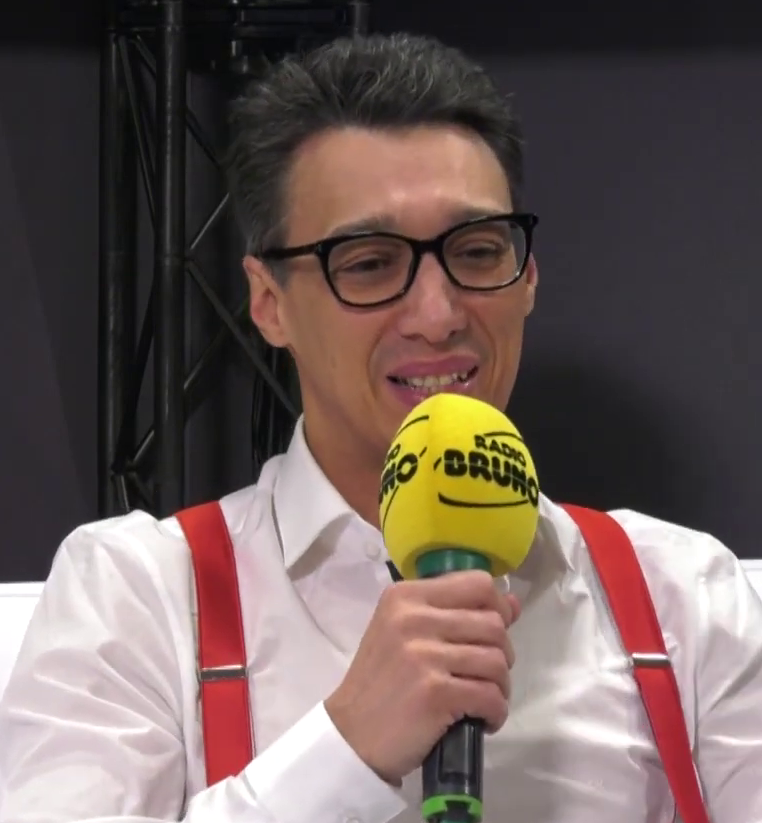
- Paolo Jannacci in 2020

Background information
- Born: 5 September 1972 (age 53); Milan, Lombardy, Italy
- Genres: Jazz; Pop
- Occupations: Singer, composer, pianist, bass guitarist, accordionist
- Years active: 1988–present

Paolo Maria Jannacci (born 5 September 1972) is an Italian singer, pianist and composer. He is the son of singer-songwriter Enzo Jannacci.

Jannacci participated at the Sanremo Music Festival 2020 with the song "Voglio parlarti adesso".

== Discography ==
=== Studio albums ===
- Notes (2002)
- Tape 1 (2004)
- Paolo Jannacci Trio (2008)
- Allegra (2013)
- Hard Playing (2017)
- Canterò (2019)
