= Sanremo Music Festival 2020 =

Italian song contest (70th edition)

Dates and venue
- Semi-final 1: 4 February 2020
- Semi-final 2: 5 February 2020
- Semi-final 3: 6 February 2020
- Semi-final 4: 7 February 2020
- Final: 8 February 2020
- Venue: Teatro Ariston; Sanremo, Italy

Production
- Broadcaster: Radiotelevisione italiana (RAI)
- Director: Stefano Vicario
- Musical director: Leonardo De Amicis
- Artistic director: Amadeus
- Presenters: Amadeus and Fiorello (Note: Absent during the third evening) with Rula Jebreal (first night) Diletta Leotta first and fifth night) Laura Chimenti and Emma D'Aquino (second night) Sabrina Salerno (second and fifth night) Georgina Rodríguez and Alketa Vejsiu (third night) Antonella Clerici (fourth night)

Big Artists section
- Number of entries: 24
- Winner: "Fai rumore" Diodato

Newcomers' section
- Number of entries: 8
- Winner: "Vai bene così" Leo Gassmann

The Sanremo Music Festival 2020 (Italian: Festival di Sanremo 2020), officially the 70th Italian Song Festival (70º Festival della canzone italiana), was the 70th edition of the annual Sanremo Music Festival, a television song contest held at the Teatro Ariston of Sanremo and organised and broadcast by Radiotelevisione italiana (RAI). The show was held between 4 and 8 February 2020 and was presented by Amadeus, who also served as the artistic director for the competition, alongside Fiorello.

The competition was divided in two sections. The winner of the Big Artists section was Diodato with the song "Fai rumore", while Leo Gassmann won the Newcomers' section with "Vai bene così". As a result of his victory, Diodato earned the right to represent Italy in the Eurovision Song Contest 2020 before that event was cancelled due to the COVID-19 pandemic; he subsequently performed "Fai rumore" in the non-competitive replacement show Eurovision: Europe Shine a Light.

== Format ==
The 2020 edition of the Sanremo Music Festival took place at the Teatro Ariston in Sanremo, organized by the Italian public broadcaster RAI. The artistic director and the presenter for the competition was Amadeus.

=== Presenters ===
On 2 August 2019, RAI officially confirmed Amadeus as the presenter of the 70th edition of the Sanremo Music Festival. Together with Amadeus, ten co-hosts alternated during the five evenings: Laura Chimenti, Antonella Clerici, Emma D'Aquino, Rula Jebreal, Diletta Leotta, Francesca Sofia Novello, Georgina Rodríguez, Sabrina Salerno, Alketa Vejsiu and Mara Venier. Actress Monica Bellucci was set to participate as special guest, but she quit two weeks before the festival started.

=== Voting ===
Voting occurred through the combination of four methods:

- Public televoting, carried out via landline, mobile phone, the contest's official mobile app, and online voting.
- Jury of the Press Room, TV, Radio and Web.
- Demoscopic jury, composed by music fans who voted from their homes via an electronic voting system managed by Ipsos.
- Musicians and singers of the Sanremo Music Festival Orchestra.

Voting during the five evenings:

- First evening: Demoscopic jury.
- Second evening: Demoscopic jury.
- Third evening: Music and singers of the Sanremo Music Festival Orchestra.
- Fourth evening: Jury of the Press Room, TV, Radio and Web.
- Fifth evening. The voting systems will have the following weight: 34% Public televoting; 33% Jury of the Press Room, TV, Radio and Web; 33% Demoscopic Jury. At the end, a ranking of the songs/artists will be drawn up determined by the average of voting percentages obtained in all the evenings.

== Selections ==
=== Newcomers' section ===
The artists competing in the Newcomers' section were selected through two separate contests: Sanremo Giovani and Area Sanremo.

==== Sanremo Giovani ====
On 23 October 2019, Rai Commission for Sanremo Music Festival 2020 announced a list of 842 acts, but only 65 artists coming from all Italian regions -excluding Basilicata and Valle d'Aosta- and from abroad were selected in the first phase.

On 3 November 2019, the jury of Sanremo Festival 2020 selected the 20 semi-finalists. The selection was followed by a subsequent skimming during four episodes of the daytime show Italia sì, hosted by Marco Liorni, in which the artists and their entries were presented and the 10 finalists were selected.

On 19 December 2019, the ten finalists performed their songs at Sanremo Casino in Sanremo, with the show Sanremo Giovani 2019 broadcast on Rai 1 presented by Amadeus. The evening is divided into 5 duels, the five selected by the jury, televote, music commission and demoscopic jury were added to the two entries of Area Sanremo and Sanremo Young's winner, for a total of eight young emerging artists in the category of the Newcomers' section of the Sanremo Music Festival 2020. Leo Gassmann, Fadi, Marco Sentieri, Fasma and Eugenio in Via Di Gioia were chosen as contestants of the Newcomers' section of the Sanremo Music Festival 2020.

Enters Sanremo 2020

Duel	R/O	Artist	Song	TV Jury	Music Comm.	Demoscopic	Televote	Tiebreaker	Total
1	1	Thomas	"Ne 80"			X	X		2
1	2	Leo Gassmann	"Vai bene così"	X	X			X	3
2	3	Réclame	"Il viaggio di ritorno"			X			1
2	4	Fadi	"Due noi"	X	X		X		3
3	5	Shari	"Stella"	X	X				2
3	6	Marco Sentieri	"Billy Blu"	X		X	X		3
4	7	Jefeo	"Uno due tre stella"						0
4	8	Fasma	"Per sentirmi vivo"	X	X	X	X		4
5	9	Eugenio in Via Di Gioia	"Tsunami"	X	X		X		3
5	10	Avincola	"Un rider"	X		X			2

==== Area Sanremo ====
After the auditions, RAI Commission - composed by Massimo Cotto, Vittorio De Scalzi, Teresa De Sio, Andrea "Andy" Fumagalli and Petra Magoni; plus the participation of Gianni Testa - identified 8 finalists for the competition among the 750 acts:

- Alessia Geraldi
- Alex Leo
- Arianna Manca
- Camilla Magli
- Gabriella Martinelli & Lula
- Jacqueline Branciforte
- Matteo Faustini
- Messya

==== Newcomers' Finalists ====
- Leo Gassmann - "Vai bene così"
- Fadi - "Due noi"
- Marco Sentieri - "Billy Blu"
- Fasma - "Per sentirmi vivo"
- Eugenio in Via Di Gioia - "Tsunami"
- Matteo Faustini - "Nel bene e nel male"
- Gabriella Martinelli & Lula - "Il gigante d'acciaio"
- Tecla Insolia - "8 marzo"

=== Big section ===
The Big Artists section of the contest will see the participation of 24 artists. All the artists performed several times and were scored during the week, but every competing artist advanced to the final night.

== Competing entries ==
Competing songs and artists, showing writers, orchestra conductor and results achieved
Big Artists section
Song	Artist	Songwriter(s)	Orchestra conductor	Rank	Sanremo Music Festival Awards
"Fai rumore"	Diodato	Antonio Diodato; Edwyn Roberts	Rodrigo D'Erasmo	1	Winner of the "Big Artists" section - Golden Lion; Critics' Award "Mia Martini"; Press, Radio, TV & Web Award "Lucio Dalla"; Lunezia Award for Best Music-letterary Value
"Viceversa"	Francesco Gabbani	Francesco Gabbani; Pacifico	Fabio Gurian	2	TIMmusic Award for Most-Streamed Song
"Ringo Starr"	Pinguini Tattici Nucleari	Riccardo Zanotti	Enrico Melozzi	3	
"Dov'è"	Le Vibrazioni	Roberto Casalino; Francesco Sarcina; Davide Simonetta	Peppe Vessicchio	4	
"Gigante"	Piero Pelù	Piero Pelù; Luca Chiaravalli	Luca Chiaravalli	5	
"Ho amato tutto"	Tosca	Pietro Cantarelli	Valeriano Chiaravalle	6	"Giancarlo Bigazzi" Award for Best Arrangement; "Nilla Pizzi" Award for Best Song's Interpretation
"Andromeda"	Elodie	Mahmood; Dario "Dardust" Faini	Silvia Catasta	7	
"Me ne frego"	Achille Lauro	Achille Lauro; Daniele Dezi; Daniele Mungai; Matteo Ciceroni; Edoardo Manozzi	Beatrice Antolini	8	
"Finalmente io"	Irene Grandi	Vasco Rossi; Roberto Casini; Andrea Righi; Gaetano Curreri	Celso Valli	9	
"Eden"	Rancore	Tarek Iurcich; Dario "Dardust" Faini	Carmelo Patti	10	"Sergio Bardotti" Award for Best Lyrics
"Carioca"	Raphael Gualazzi	Raphael Gualazzi; Davide Pavanello; Davide Petrella	Stefano Nanni	11	
"Tikibombom"	Levante	Levante	Daniel Bestonzo	12	
"Rosso di rabbia"	Anastasio	Anastasio; Stefano Tartaglini; Marco Azara; Luciano Serventi	Enrico Melozzi	13	
"Il sole ad est"	Alberto Urso	Piero Romitelli; Gerardo Pulli	Celso Valli	14	
"Il confronto"	Marco Masini	Marco Masini; Federica Camba; Daniele Coro	Roberto Rossi	15	
"Voglio parlarti adesso"	Paolo Jannacci	Emiliano Bassi; Maurizio Bassi; Andrea Bonomo; Paolo Jannacci	Maurizio Bassi	16	
"Niente (Resilienza 74)"	Rita Pavone	Giorgio Merk	Filadelfo Castro	17	
"Nell'estasi o nel fango"	Michele Zarrillo	Valentina Parisse; Michelle Zarillo	Adriano Pennino	18	
"Baciami adesso"	Enrico Nigiotti	Enrico Nigiotti	Celso Valli	19	
"Come mia madre"	Giordana Angi	Giordana Angi; Manuel Finotti	Giovanna Sciabbarrarsi; Fabio Barnanba (Note: Only in the third night)	20	
"Musica (e il resto scompare)"	Elettra Lamborghini	Michele Canova Iorfida; Davide Petrella	Enzo Campagnoli	21	
"No grazie"	Junior Cally	Antonio "Junior Cally" Signore; Jacopo Ettorre; Eugenio Maimone; Leonardo Grillotti; Merk & Kremont	Enrico Melozzi	22	
"Lo sappiamo entrambi"	Riki	Riccardo "Riki" Marcuzzo; Riccardo Scirè	Pino Perris	23	
"Sincero"	Bugo & Morgan	Andrea Bonomo; Morgan; Bugo; Simone Bertolotti	Simone Bertolotti; Morgan	Disqualified	
Newcomers' section
Song	Artist	Songwriter(s)	Orchestra conductor	Rank	Sanremo Music Festival Awards
"Vai bene così"	Leo Gassmann	Leo Gassmann; Matteo Costanzo	Maurizio Filardo	1	Winner of the Newcomers' section - Silver Lion
"8 marzo"	Tecla Insolia	Piero Romitelli; Rory Di Benedetto; Marco Vito; Emilio Munda; Rosario Canale	Diego Calvetti	2	"Enzo Jannacci" Award for Best Performance; Press, Radio, TV & Web Award "Lucio Dalla"
"Per sentirmi vivo"	Fasma	Fasma; Luigi Zammarano	Enrico Melozzi	Finalist	
"Billy Blu"	Marco Sentieri	Giampiero Artegiani	Danilo Riccardi	Finalist	
"Tsunami"	Eugenio in Via Di Gioia	Eugenio Cesaro; Emanuele Via; Paolo Di Gioia; Lorenzo Federici; Dario "Dardust" Faini	Carlo Alberto Cipolla	Eliminated	Critics' Award "Mia Martini"
"Nel bene e nel male"	Matteo Faustini	Matteo Faustini; Marco Rettani	Mario Natale	Eliminated	Lunezia Award for Best Music-letterary Value
"Il gigante d'acciaio"	Gabriella Martinelli & Lula	Gabriella Martinelli; Lucrezia Di Fiandra; Paolo Mazziotti	Carlo Carcano	Eliminated	
"Due noi"	Fadi	Fadi; Antonio Filippelli	Daniel Bestonzo	Eliminated	

== Shows ==
=== First evening ===
The first twelve Big Artists each performed their song and the first four Newcomers each performed their song for the first time in two matches, two for each one.

==== Big Artists ====
R/O	Artist	Song	Votes	Place
R/O	Artist	Song	Demoscopic Jury (weight 33%)	Place
1	Irene Grandi	"Finalmente io"	4th	7
2	Marco Masini	"Il confronto"	5th	11
3	Rita Pavone	"Niente (Resilienza 74)"	10th	19
4	Achille Lauro	"Me ne frego"	9th	17
5	Diodato	"Fai rumore"	3rd	6
6	Le Vibrazioni	"Dov'è"	1st	2
7	Anastasio	"Rosso di rabbia"	8th	15
8	Elodie	"Andromeda"	2nd	5
9	Bugo e Morgan	"Sincero"	12th	23
10	Alberto Urso	"Il sole ad est"	6th	12
11	Riki	"Lo sappiamo entrambi"	11th	20
12	Raphael Gualazzi	"Carioca"	7th	14

==== Newcomers ====
Advanced in the semi-final

Manche	R/O	Artist	Song	Votes
Manche	R/O	Artist	Song	Demoscopic Jury (weight 33%)
I	1	Eugenio in Via Di Gioia	"Tsunami"	49,40%
I	2	Tecla	"8 Marzo"	50,60%
II	3	Fadi	"Due noi"	46,00%
II	4	Leo Gassmann	"Vai bene così"	54,00%

=== Second evening ===
The other twelve Big Artists each performed their song and the other four Newcomers each performed their song for the first time.

==== Big Artists ====
R/O	Artist	Song	Votes	
R/O	Artist	Song	Demoscopic Jury (weight 33%)	Place
1	Piero Pelù	"Gigante"	2nd	3
2	Elettra Lamborghini	"Musica (e il resto scompare)"	10th	21
3	Enrico Nigiotti	"Baciami adesso"	9th	18
4	Levante	"Tikibombom"	6th	10
5	Pinguini Tattici Nucleari	"Ringo Starr"	3rd	4
6	Tosca	"Ho amato tutto"	4th	8
7	Francesco Gabbani	"Viceversa"	1st	1
8	Paolo Jannacci	"Voglio parlarti adesso"	8th	16
9	Rancore	"Eden"	11th	22
10	Junior Cally	"No grazie"	12th	24
11	Giordana Angi	"Come mia madre"	7th	13
12	Michele Zarrillo	"Nell'estasi o nel fango"	5th	9

==== Newcomers ====
Advanced in the semi-final

Manche	R/O	Artist	Song	Votes
Manche	R/O	Artist	Song	Demoscopic Jury (weight 33%)
I	1	Gabriella Martinelli e Lula	"Il gigante d'acciaio"	49,00%
I	2	Fasma	"Per sentirmi vivo"	51,00%
II	3	Marco Sentieri	"Billy Blu"	52,00%
II	4	Matteo Faustini	"Nel bene e nel male"	48,00%

=== Third evening - Sanremo 70 ===
All the twenty-four Big Artists each performed a song that are part of the history of the Sanremo Music Festival. In this case, the artists can choose whether or not to be accompanied by Italian or foreign guests.

==== Big Artists ====
R/O	Artist	Guest	Song (Original artist)	Year	Votes	
R/O	Artist	Guest	Song (Original artist)	Year	Sanremo Orchestra (weight 33%)	Place
1	Michele Zarrillo	Fausto Leali	"Deborah" (Fausto Leali)	1968	15th	10
2	Junior Cally	Viito	"Vado al massimo" (Vasco Rossi)	1982	21st	23
3	Marco Masini	Arisa	"Vacanze romane" (Matia Bazar)	1983	10th	8
4	Riki	Ana Mena	"L'edera" (Nilla Pizzi)	1958	22nd	21
5	Raphael Gualazzi	Simona Molinari	"E se domani" (Mina)	1964	11th	14
6	Anastatio	Premiata Forneria Marconi	"Spalle al muro" (Renato Zero)	1991	4th	12
7	Levante	Francesca Michielin and Maria Antonietta	"Si può dare di più" (Umberto Tozzi, Gianni Morandi & Enrico Ruggeri)	1987	17th	11
8	Alberto Urso	Ornella Vanoni	"La voce del silenzio" (Tony Del Monaco)	1968	20th	13
9	Elodie	Aeham Ahmad	"Adesso tu" (Eros Ramazzotti)	1986	19th	7
10	Rancore	Dardust and La Rappresentante di Lista	"Luce (tramonti a nord est)" (Elisa)	2001	8th	20
11	Pinguini Tattici Nucleari		"Settanta volte" (Medley)	Various	3rd	5
12	Enrico Nigiotti	Simone Cristicchi	"Ti regalerò una rosa" (Simone Cristicchi)	2007	12th	16
13	Giordana Angi	Solis String Quartet	"La nevicata del '56" (Mia Martini)	1990	18th	17
14	Le Vibrazioni	Canova	"Un'emozione da poco" (Anna Oxa)	1978	6th	2
15	Diodato	Nina Zilli	"24 mila baci" (Adriano Celentano)	1961	5th	6
16	Tosca	Silvia Pérez Cruz	"Piazza Grande" (Lucio Dalla)	1972	1st	4
17	Rita Pavone	Amedeo Minghi	"1950" (Amedeo Minghi)	1983	13th	19
18	Achille Lauro	Annalisa	"Gli uomini non cambiano" (Mia Martini)	1992	16th	18
19	Bugo & Morgan		"Canzone per te" (Sergio Endrigo)	1968	24th	24
20	Irene Grandi	Bobo Rondelli	"La musica è finita" (Ornella Vanoni)	1967	14th	9
21	Piero Pelù		"Cuore matto" (Little Tony)	1967	2nd	3
22	Paolo Jannacci	Francesco Mandelli and Daniele Moretto	"Se me lo dicevi prima" (Enzo Jannacci)	1989	7th	15
23	Elettra Lamborghini	Myss Keta	"Non succederà piu" (Claudia Mori)	1982	23rd	22
24	Francesco Gabbani		"L'Italiano" (Toto Cutugno)	1983	8th	1

=== Fourth evening ===
All the twenty-four Big Artists each performed once again their songs. Also, the winner of the 4 remaining songs in the Newcomers section was determined.

During the evening, Bugo & Morgan were disqualified for failing to deliver their performance.

==== Big Artists ====
Disqualified

R/O	Artist	Song	Votes	Place
R/O	Artist	Song	Press Jury (weight 33%)	Place
1	Paolo Jannacci	"Voglio parlarti adesso"	13th	14
2	Rancore	"Eden"	7th	9
3	Giordana Angi	"Come mia madre"	19th	19
4	Francesco Gabbani	"Viceversa"	2nd	2
5	Raphael Gualazzi	"Carioca"	12th	12
6	Pinguini Tattici Nucleari	"Ringo Starr"	3rd	4
7	Anastasio	"Rosso di rabbia"	11th	10
8	Elodie	"Andromeda"	8th	7
9	Riki	"Lo sappiamo entrambi"	22nd	22
10	Diodato	"Fai rumore"	1st	1
11	Irene Grandi	"Finalmente io"	10th	8
12	Achille Lauro	"Me ne frego"	9th	11
13	Piero Pelù	"Gigante"	5th	5
14	Tosca	"Ho amato tutto"	6th	6
15	Michele Zarrillo	"Nell'estasi o nel fango"	20th	17
16	Junior Cally	"No grazie"	17th	23
17	Le Vibrazioni	"Dov'è"	4th	3
18	Alberto Urso	"Il sole ad est"	23rd	18
19	Levante	"Tikibombom"	15th	14
20	~~Bugo & Morgan~~	~~"Sincero"~~	~~-~~	~~-~~
21	Rita Pavone	"Niente (Resilienza 74)"	14th	16
22	Enrico Nigiotti	"Baciami adesso"	21st	20
23	Elettra Lamborghini	"Musica (e il resto scompare)"	18th	21
24	Marco Masini	"Il confronto"	16th	15

==== Newcomers ====
Advanced in the final
Winner

Manche	R/O	Artist	Song	Votes			
Manche	R/O	Artist	Song	Demoscopic Jury (weight 33%)	Press Jury (weight 33%)	Public (weight 34%)	Average
I	1	Tecla	"8 marzo"	50,03%	50,97%	65,59%	55,63%
I	2	Marco Sentieri	"Billy Blu"	49,97%	49,03%	34,41%	44,37%
II	3	Leo Gassmann	"Vai bene così"	51,68%	52,03%	46,84%	50,15%
II	4	Fasma	"Per sentirmi vivo"	48,32%	47,97%	53,16%	49,85%

R/O	Artist	Song	Votes			
R/O	Artist	Song	Demoscopic Jury (weight 33%)	Press Jury (weight 33%)	Public (weight 34%)	Average
1	Tecla	"8 marzo"	49,25%	43,57%	49,76%	47,55%
2	Leo Gassmann	"Vai bene così"	50,75%	56,43%	50,24%	52,45%

=== Fifth evening ===
The 23 Big Artists each performed their entry for a final time. The top three then faced a superfinal vote, where the winner was decided.

Advanced in the superfinal

R/O	Artist	Song	Votes				Place
R/O	Artist	Song	Demoscopic Jury (weight 33%)	Press Jury (weight 33%)	Public (weight 34%)	Average	Place
1	Michele Zarrillo	"Nell'estasi o nel fango"	2,75%	1,46%	1,31%	1,83%	18
2	Elodie	"Andromeda"	7,00%	7,14%	4,17%	6,09%	7
3	Enrico Nigiotti	"Baciami Adesso"	2,26%	1,03%	1,40%	2,63%	19
4	Irene Grandi	"Finalmente io"	5,11%	3,74%	2,33%	3,71%	9
5	Alberto Urso	"Il sole ad est"	3,43%	0,99%	11,43%	5,34%	14
6	Diodato	"Fai rumore"	9,38%	21,88%	9,08%	13,40%	1
7	Marco Masini	"Il confronto"	3,54%	1,93%	2,86%	2,78%	15
8	Piero Pelù	"Gigante"	7,82%	5,44%	6,72%	6,66%	5
9	Levante	"Tikibombom"	3,65%	3,04%	2,66%	3,11%	12
10	Pinguini Tattici Nucleari	"Ringo Starr"	7,74%	6,03%	11,42%	8,43%	3
11	Achille Lauro	"Me ne frego"	4,22%	5,05%	9,37%	6,25%	8
12	Junior Cally	"No grazie"	1,40%	1,74%	1,46%	1,53%	22
13	Raphael Gualazzi	"Carioca"	3,90%	3,94%	1,73%	3,18%	11
14	Tosca	"Ho amato tutto"	5,22%	6,36%	2,41%	4,64%	6
15	Francesco Gabbani	"Viceversa"	9,78%	10,30%	14,75%	11,64%	2
16	Rita Pavone	"Niente (Resilienza 74)"	2,28%	2,20%	1,36%	1,94%	17
17	Le Vibrazioni	"Dov'è"	8,75%	5,64%	4,63%	6,32%	4
18	Anastasio	"Rosso di rabbia"	3,03%	2,32%	2,17%	2,50%	13
19	Riki	"Lo sappiamo entrambi"	1,53%	0,45%	1,77%	1,26%	23
20	Giordana Angi	"Come mia madre"	1,42%	0,55%	1,80%	1,26%	20
21	Paolo Jannacci	"Voglio parlarti adesso"	2,18%	2,20%	0,45%	1,60%	16
22	Elettra Lamborghini	"Musica (e il resto scompare)"	1,78%	2,03%	2,25%	2,02%	21
23	Rancore	"Eden"	1,83%	4,54%	2,46%	2,94%	10

==== Superfinal ====
Winner
Runner-up
Third place

R/O	Artist	Song	Votes				Place
R/O	Artist	Song	Demoscopic Jury (weight 33%)	Press Jury (weight 33%)	Public (weight 34%)	Average	Place
1	Diodato	"Fai rumore"	36,33%	57,97%	23,93%	39,26%	1
2	Francesco Gabbani	"Viceversa"	38,67%	24,16%	38,85%	33,94%	2
3	Pinguini Tattici Nucleari	"Ringo Starr"	25,00%	17,87%	37,21%	26,80%	3

== Special guests ==
The special guests of Sanremo Music Festival 2020 were:

- Singers / musicians: Alessandra Amoroso, Albano, Biagio Antonacci, Bobby Solo, Coez, Dua Lipa, Elisa Toffoli, Emma Marrone, Fiorella Mannoia, Gente de Zona, Ghali, Gianna Nannini, Gigi D'Alessio, Giorgia, Kumalibre, Laura Pausini, Lewis Capaldi, Massimo Ranieri, Mika, Ricchi e Poveri, Roger Waters, Romina Power, Tiziano Ferro, Tony Renis, Vittorio Grigolo, Wilma De Angelis, Zucchero.
- Actors / comedians / directors / models: Alma Noce, Andrea Pittorino, Antonio Maggio, Christian De Sica, Claudio Santamaria, Cristiana Capotondi, Diego Abatantuono, Donatella Finocchiaro, Edoardo Pesce, Francesco Centorame, Gabriele Muccino, Gaia Gerace, Gessica Notaro, Kim Rossi Stuart, Margherita Mazzucco, Massimo Ghini, Micaela Ramazzotti, Paolo Rossi, Pierfrancesco Favino, Riccardo Morozzi, Roberto Benigni, Rosario Fiorello.
- Other persons or notable figures: Carlotta Mantovan, Costantino della Gherardesca, Cristiano Ronaldo, Dayane Mello, Max Giusti, Novak Djokovic, Nicola Savino, Paolo Palumbo, Vincenzo Mollica.

== Broadcast and ratings ==
=== Local broadcast ===
Rai 1 and Rai Radio 2 carried the official broadcasts of the festival in Italy. The five evenings were also streamed online via the broadcaster's official website RaiPlay.

==== Ratings Sanremo Music Festival 2020 ====
The audience is referred to that of Rai 1.

Live Show	Timeslot (UTC+1)	Date	1st time (9.00pm - 0.00am)		2nd time (0.00am - 1.30am)		Overall audience	
Live Show	Timeslot (UTC+1)	Date	Viewers	Share (%)	Viewers	Share (%)	Viewers	Share (%)
1st	9:00 pm	February 4	12,480,000	51.2	5,698,000	56.2	10,058,000	52.2
2nd	9:00 pm	February 5	12,841,000	52.5	5,451,000	56.1	9,693,000	53.3
3rd	9:00 pm	February 6	13,533,000	53.6	5,636,000	57.2	9,836,000	54.5
4th	9:00 pm	February 7	12,674,000	52.3	5,795,000	56.0	9,504,000	53.3
5th	9:00 pm	February 8	13,638,000	56.8	8,969,000	68.8	11,477,000	60.6

=== International broadcast ===
The international television service Rai Italia broadcast the competition in the Americas, Africa, Asia, Australia and Europe. The contest was also streamed via the official Eurovision Song Contest website eurovision.tv. Omni Television broadcast all five shows in Canada on a delay from February 10 to the 14th. RTSH, TVR and RTCG also broadcast Sanremo 2020.

== See also ==
- Italy in the Eurovision Song Contest 2020
