= Francesco Sarcina =

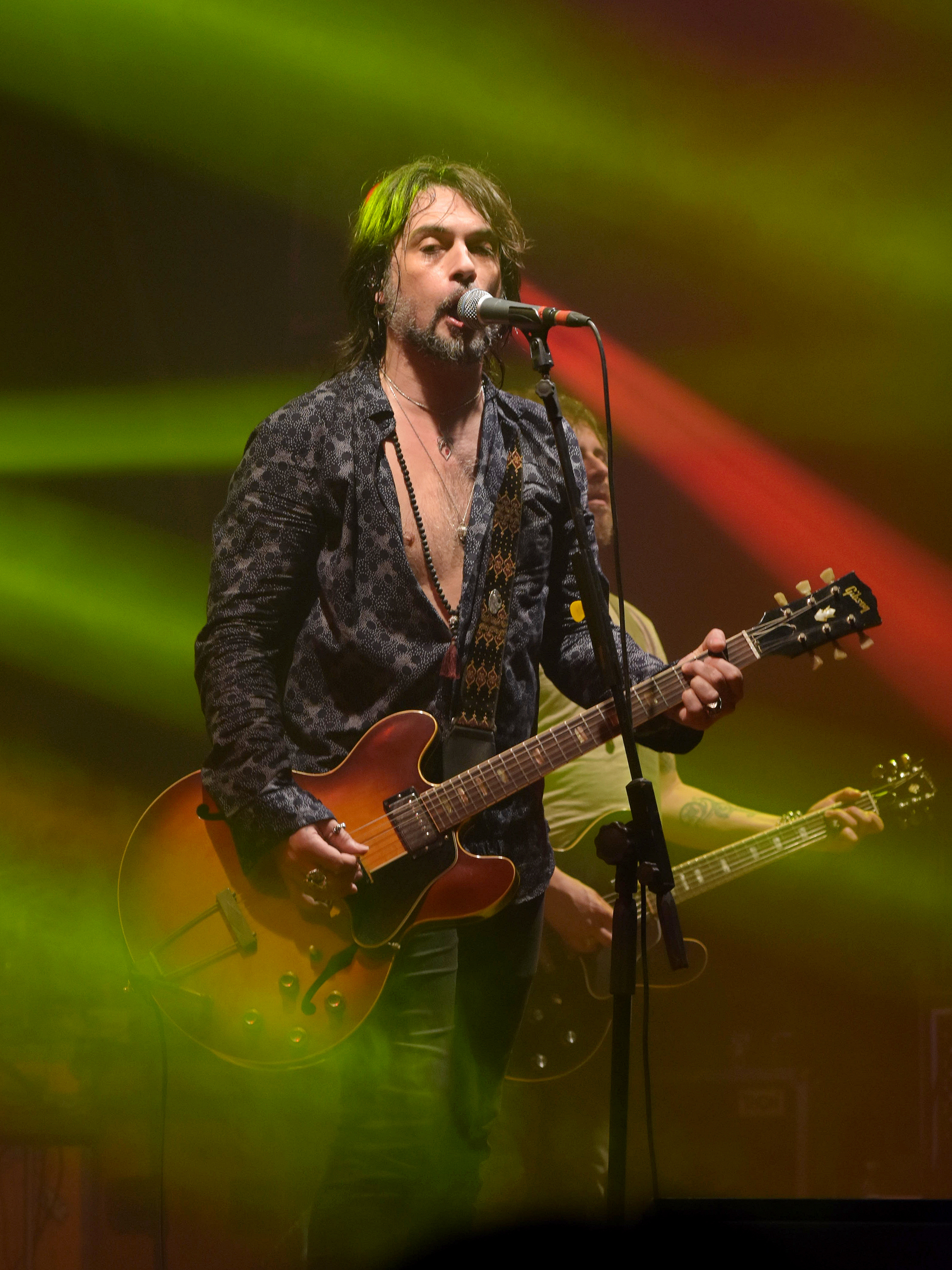
- Francesco Sarcina in 2018

Background information
- Born: 30 October 1976 (age 49); Milan, Italy
- Genres: Soft rock; pop rock
- Occupations: Musician; singer; songwriter
- Instruments: Vocals; guitars
- Years active: 1999–present
- Label: Universal
- Member of: Le Vibrazioni

Francesco Sarcina (Italian pronunciation: [franˈtʃesko ˈsartʃina]; born 30 October 1976) is an Italian singer-songwriter, best known for being the frontman of rock band Le Vibrazioni.

Besides his activity with Le Vibrazioni, he started a solo career in 2013 with the single "Tutta la notte". He released two studio albums, Io (2014) and Femmina (2015). Sarcina participated in the Sanremo Music Festival four times as a member of Le Vibrazioni (2005, 2018, 2020, 2022) and one time as a solo artist in 2014, with the song "Nel tuo sorriso".

== Discography ==
=== Solo ===
- Io (2014)
- Femmina (2015)
