= Tikibombom =

Single by Levante

from the album Magmamemoria MMXX (Deluxe Edition)
- Released: 6 February 2020
- Genre: Indie pop
- Length: 3:23
- Label: Parlophone, Warner Music Italy
- Songwriter: Levante
- Producer: Antonio Filippelli

Levante singles chronology
"Bravi tutti voi" (2019)	"Tikibombom" (2020)	"Sirene" (2020)

"Tikibombom" is a song by Italian singer Levante. It was written by Levante and produced by Antonio Filippelli.

It was released by Parlophone and Warner Music Italy on 6 February 2020 as the first single from the reissue of fourth studio album Magmamemoria. The song was Levante's entry for the Sanremo Music Festival 2020, the 70th edition of Italy's musical festival which doubles also as a selection of the act for Eurovision Song Contest, where it placed 12th in the grand final. "Tikibombom" peaked at number 8 on the Italian FIMI Singles Chart and was certified platinum in Italy.

== Background ==
The main theme of the song is diversity: it is dedicated to those who want to differentiate themselves from the crowd, which is embodied by the title. The title, in fact, "repeats the rhythm of a dance song, typical of Saturday night mass culture". In the lyrics, the singer "compares the artificiality of a computerized sound to the cultural and artistic depth of tango" (Sei rimasto da solo, non segui il branco / Balli il tango, mentre tutto il mondo / Muove il fianco sopra un tempo che fa: / "Tiki-bom-bom-bom"; "You are left alone, you don't follow the crowd / You dance the tango, while the whole world / Dances on a rhythm that goes: / "Tiki-bom-bom-bom"").

== Commercial performance ==
The song was a huge radio hit in Italy, becoming the most played Sanremo song of the year on radio and the fifth overall in 2020.

== Music video ==
The music video for the song was released on YouTube on 11 February 2020. Directed by Giacomo Triglia, it reflects the non-conformist theme of the song and also contains a reference to a short film by Chinese director Sing J Lee, which shows Levante surrounded by dancers facing away from the camera.

== Live performances ==
On 22 February 2020 Levante performed an acoustic version of the song live on Verissimo.

== Track listing ==
Digital download
No.	Title	Length
1.	"Tikibombom"	3:23

Digital download
No.	Title	Length
1.	"Tikibombom (Home Version)"	3:48

== Charts ==
=== Weekly charts ===
Chart performance for "Tikibombom"
Chart (2020)	Peak position
Italy (FIMI)	8
Italy Airplay (EarOne)	1

=== Year-end charts ===
Chart (2020)	Position
Italy (FIMI)	96

== Certifications ==
Region	Certification	Certified units/sales
Italy (FIMI)	Platinum	70,000^{‡}
^{‡} Sales+streaming figures based on certification alone.
