= Irene Grandi =

Italian singer-songwriter (born 1969)

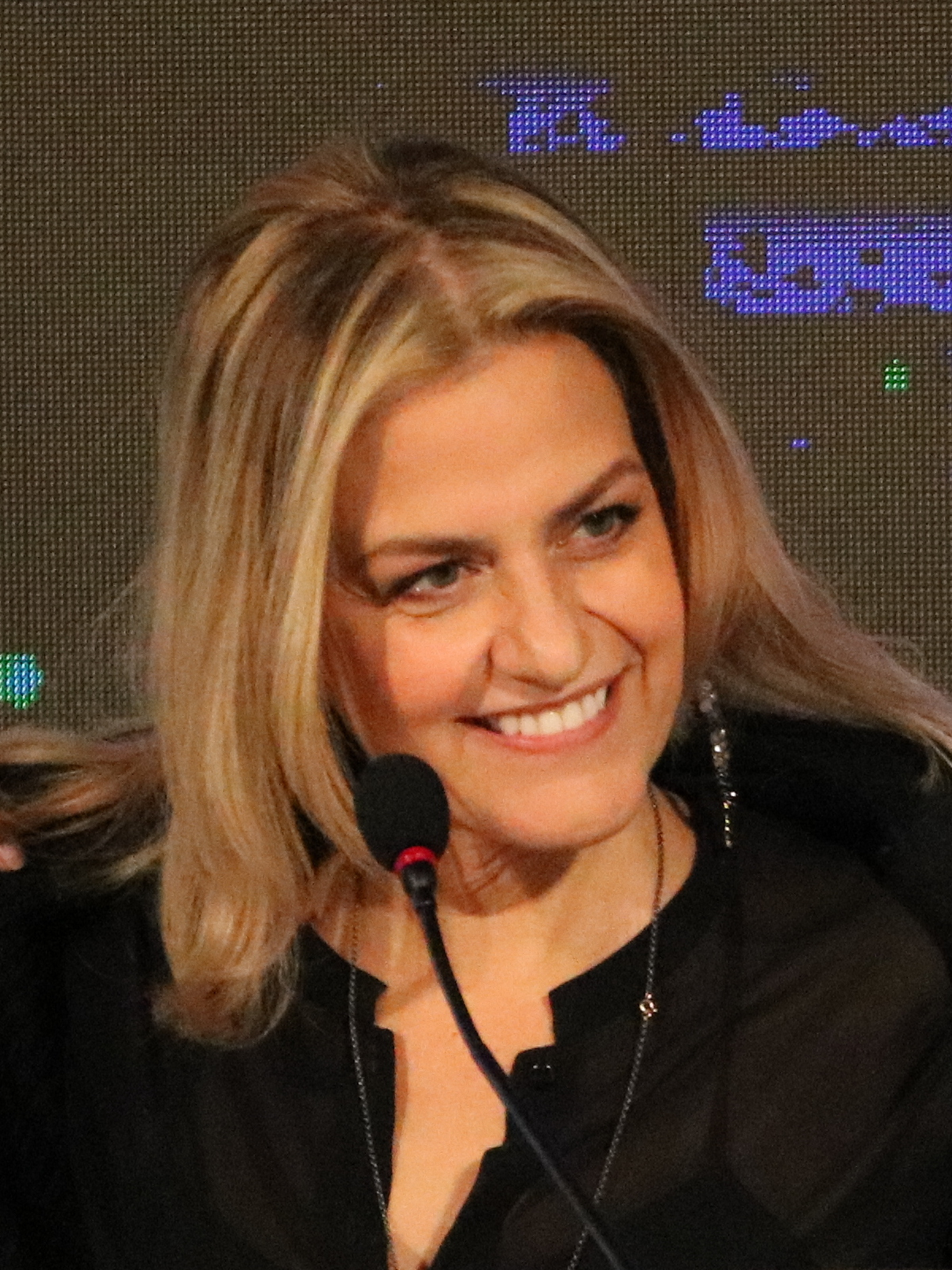
- Grandi at the Sanremo Music Festival 2020

Background information
- Born: 6 December 1969 (age 56); Florence, Tuscany, Italy
- Genres: Pop; rock; soul; blues
- Occupations: Singer; songwriter; television personality; author
- Instruments: Electric guitar; acoustic guitar; tambourine
- Years active: 1992–present
- Labels: Warner Music Group; Atlantic Records; CGD Eastwest; Carosello; 3esessanta; Columbia Records; Sony Music
- Website: irenegrandi.it

Irene Grandi (born 6 December 1969) is an Italian singer-songwriter.

During her career she has sung in Spanish and has performed duets in German, French and in Indian and African languages. She has sold around 5 million records and earned 9 top-ten albums and 6 top-ten singles including one number-one in the Italian music charts. She has participated in the Sanremo Music Festival five times, reaching the podium in 2000. She has performed six times at the Festivalbar, twice conquering the platform and winning the Radio Awards. In 2009 she won a Wind Music Award, and in 2011 a Sanremo Hit Award.

== Biography ==
Born in Florence, Grandi started singing while at high school, and was part of numerous local groups, notably Matte in Trasferta, in which Dirotta su Cuba singer Simona Bencini was a bandmate. She started her solo career in 1992, and in 1994 entered the competition in the Newcomers' section of Sanremo Music Festival 1994 with "Fuori", leading single of her first album, Irene Grandi, that contained songs written with Eros Ramazzotti ("Sposati subito") and Jovanotti ("T.V.B."). In 1995, the radio hit "Bum Bum" anticipated her successful second album, In vacanza da una vita; the same year, she toured with Pino Daniele, with whom she recorded the duet "Se mi vuoi". In 1997, she released Per fortuna purtroppo, containing the hit "Che vita è", and in 1999 Verde rosso e blu, an album characterized by more Mediterranean sounds.

In 2000, she ranked second in 50th Sanremo Festival with "La tua ragazza sempre", a song written by Vasco Rossi and Gaetano Curreri, who also wrote and produced the title-track for her following album Prima di partire.

She performed lead vocals on the song "Blue", the closing track on French producer Hector Zazou's 2003 album Strong Currents.

In 2004, she made her debut as television presenter co-hosting with Marco Maccarini the Festivalbar.

She participated as a contestant in the 60th edition of the Sanremo Music Festival in 2010 with her song "La cometa di Halley" and again in the 65th edition in 2015 with "Un vento senza nome". She competed in the Sanremo Music Festival 2020 with the song "Finalmente io".

== Discography ==
Albums

- 1994 Irene Grandi
- 1994 Irene Grandi (German Edition)
- 1995 In vacanza da una vita
- 1997 Per fortuna purtroppo
- 1998 Irene Grandi (Spanish Version)
- 1999 Verde rosso e blu
- 2000 Verde rosso e blu (Special San Remo 2000)
- 2001 Irek
- 2002 Kose da Grandi (CD-ROM)
- 2003 Prima di partire
- 2004 Irene Grandi live '03 (CD live)
- 2005 Indelebile
- 2005 Irene Grandi LIVE (DVD Live)
- 2007 IreneGrandi.HITS
- 2008 Canzoni di Natale
- 2010 Alle porte del sogno
- 2012 Irene Grandi & Stefano Bollani
- 2015 Un vento senza nome
- 2019 Grandissimo

Singles

- 1993 – Un motivo maledetto
- 1994 – Fuori
- 1994 – Fuori (radio edit)
- 1994 – Weil du unders bist
- 1994 – Sposati subito
- 1994 – Tvb
- 1994 – Vai, vai, vai
- 1994 – Cose da grandi
- 1995 – Bum Bum
- 1995 – In vacanza da una vita
- 1995 – Dolcissimo amore
- 1996 – Fai come me
- 1997 – Che vita è
- 1998 – Otto e mezzo
- 1998 – Que vida es
- 1998 – Primitiva
- 1999 – Eccezionale
- 1999 – Verde, rosso e blu
- 2000 – La tua ragazza sempre
- 2000 – Francesco
- 2001 – Per fare l'amore
- 2001 – Sconvolto così
- 2003 – Prima di partire per un lungo viaggio
- 2003 – Buon compleanno
- 2005 – Lasciala andare
- 2005 – Non resisto
- 2007 – Bruci la città
- 2008 – Sono come tu mi vuoi
- 2008 – Bianco Natale
- 2009 – Qualche piccolo ti amo
- 2010 – La cometa di Halley
- 2010 – Alle porte del sogno
- 2015 – Un vento senza nome
- 2015 – Casomai
- 2015 – A memoria
- 2019 – I passi dell'amore
- 2020 – Finalmente io
- 2020 – Devi volerti bene
- 2020 – Quel raggio nella notte
- 2022 – E poi
- 2024 – Fiera di me

== Filmography ==
- The Barber of Rio (1996)
