= Le Vibrazioni =

Italian band

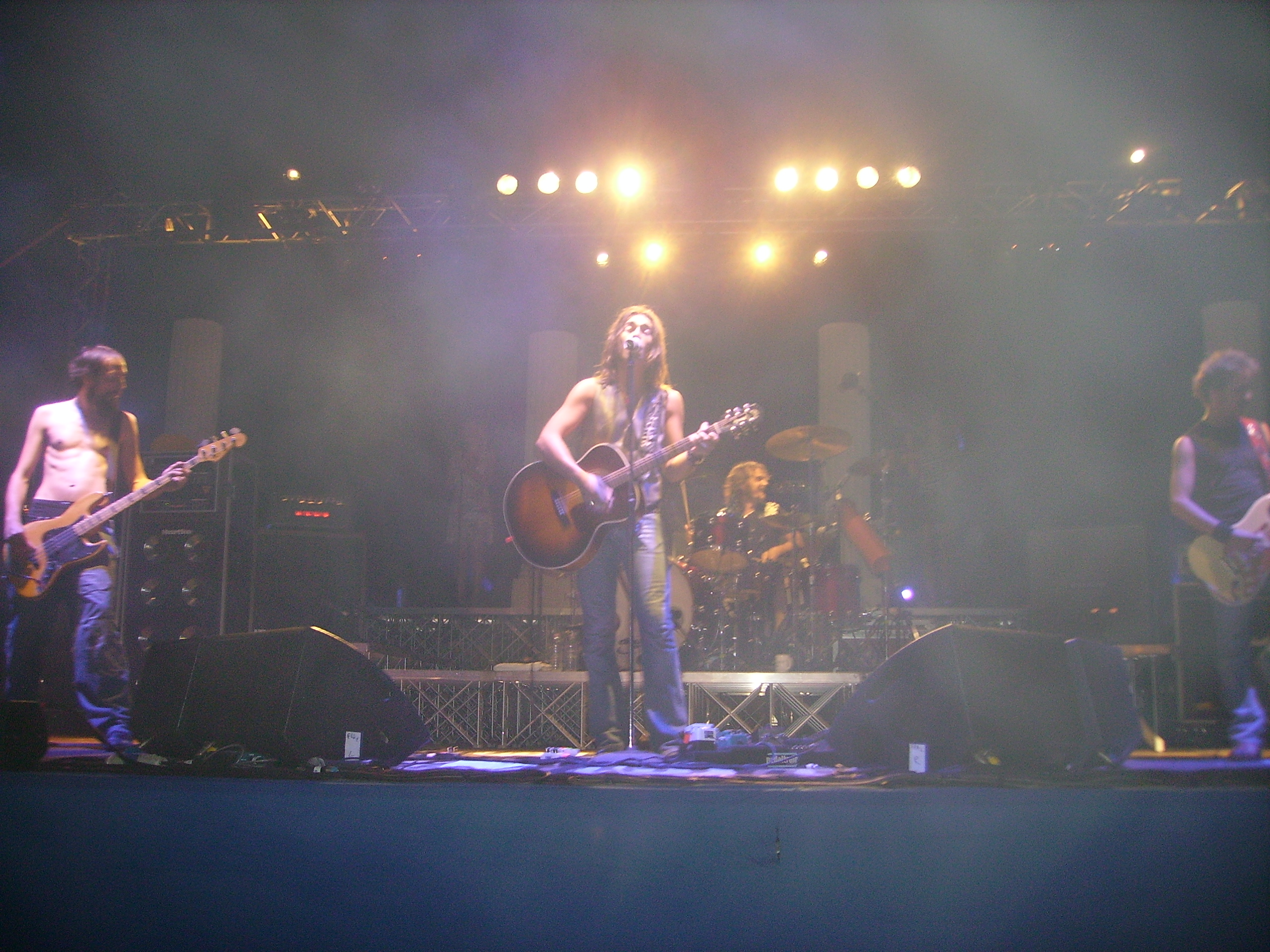
- Le Vibrazioni in concert in Partanna (TP), 2007

Background information
- Origin: Milan, Italy
- Genres: Alternative rock; pop rock; progressive rock
- Years active: 1999–2012; 2017–present
- Labels: BMG; Sony
- Members: Francesco Sarcina; Stefano Verderi; Alessandro Deidda
- Past members: Emmanuele Gardossi; Marco Castellani
- Website: vibraland.it

Le Vibrazioni (English: "The Vibrations") is an Italian rock and pop band formed in Milan in 1999. They made their breakthrough in 2003 with their debut single Dedicato a te ("Dedicated to you"), which went platinum in Italy.

== Biography ==
The four founding members, all born in Milan or its metropolitan area, are Francesco Sarcina (guitar and vocals), Stefano Verderi (guitar and keyboards), Marco Castellani (bass), and Alessandro Deidda (drums). After many years spent playing in clubs around Milan, the group signed with BMG and debuted with the single Dedicato a te, which topped the Italian charts and became one of 2003 best-selling singles. Later in the same year they published their first album, 'Le Vibrazioni', whose sales exceeded 300,000 copies and from which the singles In una notte d'estate, Vieni da me, Sono più sereno and ...E se ne va were extracted....E se ne va would later be included in the soundtrack of Luca Lucini's film Tre metri sopra il cielo (2004). The music video for Dedicato a te was subsequently spoofed by Elio e le Storie Tese in their song Shpalman. In 2008 Emanuele Gardossi replaced Marco Castellani on bass. Castellani would later rejoin the band in 2017, before leaving once more in 2024.

The band has participated four times at Sanremo Music Festival, and performed there once as guests. Their first appearance was at Sanremo 2005, with the song "Ovunque andrò", finishing in 14th place. Their second appearance was 13 years later at Sanremo 2018, with the song "Così sbagliato", finishing in 11th place. The band participated again at the Sanremo 2020 with the song "Dov'è", finishing in 4th position. They participated in Sanremo Music Festival 2022 with the song "Tantissimo", finishing in 22nd place. Their most recent appearance was their participation as guests at Sanremo Music Festival 2023 when they accompanied Modà on the covers night, with their song "Vieni da me".

== Members ==
- Francesco Sarcina – singer, guitar (1999–present)
- Stefano Verderi – guitar, keyboard, sitar (1999–present)
- Alessandro Deidda – drums (1999–present)

== Former members ==
- Emanuele Gardossi – bass guitar (2008–2012)
- Marco Castellani – bass guitar (1999–2008, 2012, 2017–2024)

== Discography ==
=== Albums ===
- Le Vibrazioni (2003)
- Le Vibrazioni II (2005)
- Officine Meccaniche (2006)
- En Vivo (2008)
- Le Strade Del Tempo (2010)
- V (2018)

=== Singles ===
- 2003 – Dedicato a te (ITA #1) / Video
- 2003 – In una notte d'estate / Video
- 2003 – E se ne va / Video
- 2003 – Vieni da me / Video
- 2004 – Sono più sereno / Video
- 2005 – Raggio di sole (ITA #3) / Video
- 2005 – Ovunque andrò / Video
- 2005 – Angelica
- 2005 – Aspettando / Video
- 2005 – Ogni giorno ad ogni ora / Video
- 2006 – Fermi senza forma (online only, on the website MtvOverdrive) / Video
- 2006 – Se / Video
- 2007 – Portami via / Video
- 2007 – Dimmi / Video
- 2008 – Drammaturgia / Video
- 2008 – Insolita / Video
- 2008 – Su un altro pianeta / Video
- 2010 – Respiro / Video
- 2010 – Senza indugio / Single
- 2010 – Invocazioni al cielo / Video
- 2011 – Come far nascere un fiore / Single
- 2012 – Il sangue e anche il resto / Single
- 2018 – Così sbagliato / Single
- 2018 – Amore Zen / Single
- 2018 – Pensami così / Single
- 2019 – Cambia / Single
- 2019 – L'amore mi fa male / Single
- 2020 – Dov'è / Single
- 2020 – Per Fare L'Amore / Single
- 2020 – Dedicato A Te (Acqua Version) / Single
- 2022 – Tantissimo / Single
- 2022 – VI / EP

=== DVDs ===
- Live all'Alcatraz (2004)
- Le Vibrazioni II (Dual Disc) (2005)
- En Vivo (2008)
