= Alberto Urso =

Italian singer

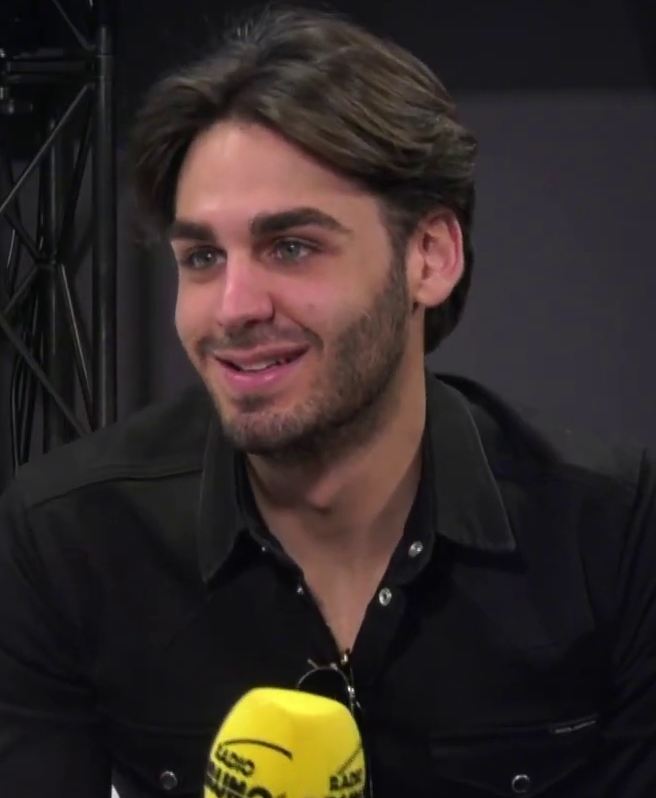

Background information
- Born: 23 July 1997 (age 29); Messina, Sicily, Italy
- Genres: Operatic pop
- Occupation: Singer
- Years active: 2010–present
- Label: Universal / Polydor (2019–present)

Alberto Urso (born 23 July 1997) is an Italian singer.

He won the eighteenth edition of the Italian talent show Amici di Maria De Filippi in May 2019. His debut album Solo was released on 10 May 2019.

Urso participated at the Sanremo Music Festival 2020 with the song "Il sole ad est".

== Discography ==
=== Studio albums ===
- Solo (2019)
- Il sole ad est (2019)

=== Singles ===
- "Accanto a te" (2019)
- "Ti lascio andare" (2019)
- "E poi ti penti" (2019)
- "Non sono più lo stesso" (2019)
- "Il sole ad est" (2020)
- "Quando, quando, quando" with J-Ax (2020)
