= Qui con me (Serena Brancale song) =

2026 single by Serena Brancale

Single by Serena Brancale

from the album Sacro
- Released: 25 February 2026
- Length: 3:16
- Label: Atlantic; Isola degli Artisti
- Composers: Serena Brancale; Alfredo Bruno; Carlo Avarello; Fabio Barnaba
- Lyricists: Serena Brancale; Noemi Bruno; Alfredo Bruno; Salvatore Mineo
- Producers: Carlo Avarello; Fabio Barnaba

Serena Brancale singles chronology
"Serenata" (2025)	"Qui con me" (2026)	"Bésame mucho" (2026)

Music video
- "Qui con me" on YouTube

"Qui con me" (Italian: [ˈkwi kkom ˈme]; "Here with Me") is a song co-written and recorded by Italian singer Serena Brancale, released on 25 February 2026 through Atlantic Records and Isola degli Artisti as the seventh single from her third studio album Sacro.

The song was presented in competition during the Sanremo Music Festival 2026, where it came 9th and received three separate awards – the Lunezia Award, the Press room award and the award for most voted song on TIM platforms.

== Composition ==
The song was written by the singer-songwriter herself alongside Alfredo Bruno, Noemi Bruno and Salvatore Mineo, and produced by Carlo Avarello and Fabio Barnaba. In an interview with Billboard Italia, the artist explained its meaning and how it was dedicated to her mother's death:

"Pain makes you vulnerable, so you never talk about it. You avoid talking about pain because it’s better to sing about happiness and joy. I’ve always tried to put off the right moment to face it. I’m doing it through music, with this song. Now I feel ready because six years have passed, whereas in the first few years after his passing I wasn’t ready at all: I would have cried, I wouldn’t have felt up to talking about it. Now everything is different; I’ve grown up. [The song has] a romantic sound, one that soothes nostalgia, resolving it with a smile. It’s a pop ballad that also has jazz elements: it represents me one hundred per cent because I like having both components."

== Promotion ==
Italian broadcaster RAI organised the 76th edition of the Sanremo Music Festival between 24 and 28 February 2026. On 30 November 2025, Brancale was announced among the participants of the festival, with the title of her competing entry revealed the following 14 December.

== Music video ==
The music video, directed by Giacomo Triglia and produced by Oceancode Studio, was released to coincide with the track’s release via the singer-songwriter’s YouTube channel.

== Charts ==
Chart performance for "Qui con me"
Chart (2026)	Peak position
Italy (FIMI)	6
Italy Airplay (EarOne)	24
