= Raphael Gualazzi discography =

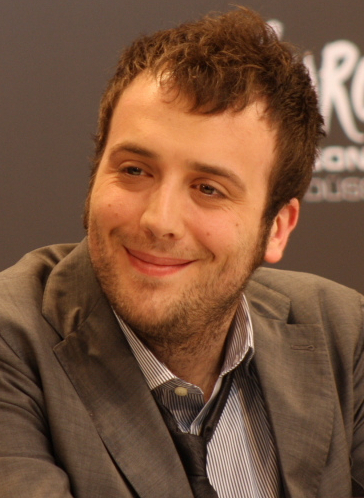
- Raphael Gualazzi at the Eurovision Song Contest 2011 in Düsseldorf, Germany.
- Studio albums: 5
- EPs: 2
- Singles: 16
- Music videos: 8

This is the discography of Raphael Gualazzi, an Italian singer and pianist.

== Studio albums ==
Title	Details	Peak chart positions					Certifications
Title	Details	ITA	AUT	BEL (Wa)	FRA	GER	Certifications
Love Outside the Window	Released: 23 September 2005; Label: Edel Music; Format: Digital download, CD	44	—	—	—	—	
Reality and Fantasy	Released: 16 February 2011; Label: Sugar Music; Format: Digital download, CD	4	53	—	—	49	FIMI: Platinum
Happy Mistake	Released: 14 February 2013; Label: Sugar Music; Format: Digital download, CD	5	—	173	87	—	FIMI: Gold
Love Life Peace	Released: 23 September 2016; Label: Sugar Music; Format: Digital download, CD	4	—	—	—	—	FIMI: Gold
Ho un piano	Released: 7 February 2020; Label: Sugar Music; Format: Digital download, CD	34	—	—	—	—	
"—" denotes an album that did not chart or was not released.

== Extended plays ==
Title	Details
Raphael Gualazzi	Released: 28 September 2010; Label: Sugar Music; Format: Digital download
Accidentally on Purpose - Sanremo's Festival 2014 (featuring The Bloody Beetroots)	Released: 20 February 2014; Label: Sugar Music; Format: Digital download

== Singles ==
Year	Title	Peak Chart positions						Certifications	Album
Year	Title	ITA	AUT	BEL (FLA)	BEL (WAL)	NL	SWI	Certifications	Album
2010	"Don't Stop"	—	—	—	—	—	—		Raphael Gualazzi
2010	"Reality and Fantasy"	—	—	—	—	—	—		Raphael Gualazzi
2011	"Follia d'amore" (Note: During the Eurovision Song Contest 2011, Gualazzi performed a half-English version of the song, titled "Madness of Love".)	8	40	83	85	90	52	FIMI: Gold	Reality and Fantasy
2011	"A Three Second Breath"	—	—	—	—	—	—		Reality and Fantasy
2011	"Calda estate (dove sei)"	—	—	—	—	—	—		Reality and Fantasy
2011	"Love Goes Down Slow"	—	—	—	—	—	—		Reality and Fantasy
2011	"Zuccherino dolce"	—	—	—	—	—	—		Reality and Fantasy
2013	"Sai (ci basta un sogno)"	15	—	—	—	—	—		Happy Mistake
2013	"Senza ritegno"	62	—	—	—	—	—		Happy Mistake
2014	"Liberi o no" (featuring The Bloody Beetroots)	20	—	—	—	—	—		Accidentally on Purpose - Sanremo's Festival 2014
2014	"Tanto ci sei" (featuring The Bloody Beetroots)	89	—	—	—	—	—		Accidentally on Purpose - Sanremo's Festival 2014
2016	"L'estate di John Wayne"	43	—	—	—	—	—	FIMI: Platinum	Love Life Peace
2016	"Lotta Things"	—	—	—	—	—	—		Love Life Peace
2017	"Buena fortuna" (featuring Malika Ayane)	—	—	—	—	—	—		Love Life Peace
2017	"La fine del mondo"	—	—	—	—	—	—		Non-album single
2020	"Carioca"	33	—	—	—	—	—		Ho un piano
"—" denotes a single that did not chart or was not released.

== Music videos ==
Year	Title	Director
2010	"Reality and Fantasy"	Valentina Be
2011	"Follia d'amore"	Valentina Be
2011	"A Three Second Breath"	Duccio Forzano
2011	"Madness of Love"	Duccio Forzano
2011	"Love Goes Down Slow"	Marco Missano
2013	"Senza ritegno"	
2013	"Sai (ci basta un sogno)"	
2016	"L'estate di John Wayne"	Jacopo Rondinelli
