= Sanremo Music Festival 2014 =

Italian song contest (64th edition)

Dates and venue
- Semi-final 1: 18 February 2014
- Semi-final 2: 19 February 2014
- Semi-final 3: 20 February 2014
- Semi-final 4: 21 February 2014
- Final: 22 February 2014
- Venue: Teatro Ariston; Sanremo, Italy

Production
- Broadcaster: Radiotelevisione italiana (RAI)
- Director: Duccio Forzano
- Musical director: Mauro Pagani
- Artistic director: Fabio Fazio
- Presenters: Fabio Fazio and Luciana Littizzetto

Vote
- Voting system: Televotes, music journalists, jury

Big Artists section
- Number of entries: 28
- Winner: "Controvento"; Arisa

Newcomers' section
- Number of entries: 8
- Winner: "Nu juorno buono" Rocco Hunt

The Sanremo Music Festival 2014 (Italian: Festival di Sanremo 2014), officially the 64th Italian Song Festival (64º Festival della canzone italiana), was the 64th annual Sanremo Music Festival, a televised song contest held at the Teatro Ariston in Sanremo, Liguria, between 18 and 22 February 2014 and broadcast by Radiotelevisione italiana (RAI). Fabio Fazio and Italian comedy actress Luciana Littizzetto presented the show.

The rules of the festival were was based on those adopted for the previous contest. Competing artists were split in two different sections—Big Artists and Newcomers. The Big Artists section included 14 established Italian artists. During the first and the second night of the show, each act performed two songs, and only one song per act was allowed to continue the competition, as a result of votes received by public and journalists. After the third night, Riccardo Sinigallia's entry, "Prima di andare via", was disqualified for being performed during a concert preceding the competition. During the final night, Arisa's "Controvento" was announced as the winning song for the Big Artists section of the contest. The Newcomers' section featured eight songs performed by debuting or little known artists. The winning entry, Rocco Hunt's "Nu juorno buono", was announced during the semi-final of the contest. For the first time since 2011, the Sanremo Music Festival was not used as a selection for the Italian entry in the Eurovision Song Contest.

The show featured guests including Luciano Ligabue, Cat Stevens, Damien Rice, Paolo Nutini, Stromae, Gino Paoli, Raffaella Carrà, Laetitia Casta and Rufus Wainwright. Despite this, it received significantly lower ratings than the previous edition, with the final receiving the lowest share percentage since the introduction of Auditel measurements in 1989.

== Presenters and personnel ==
Sanremo Music Festival 2014 presenters

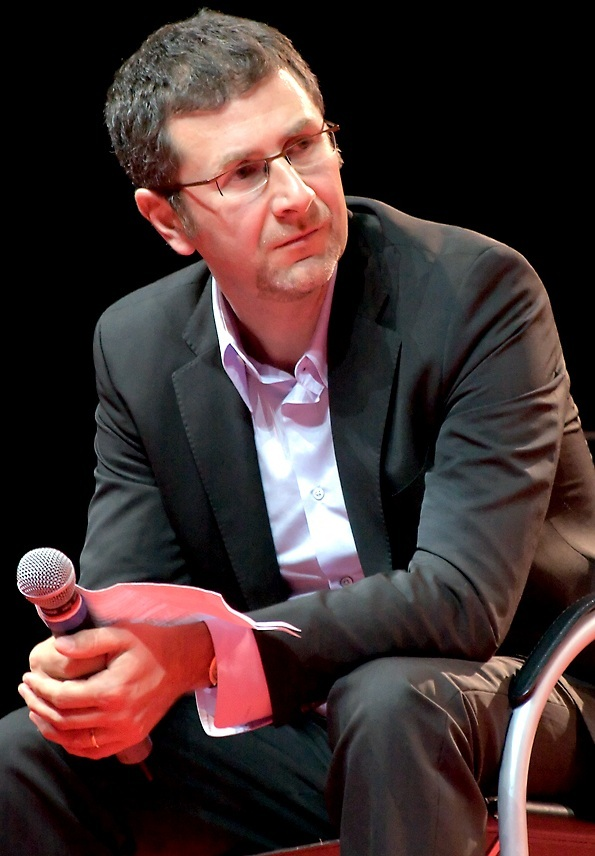
Fabio Fazio

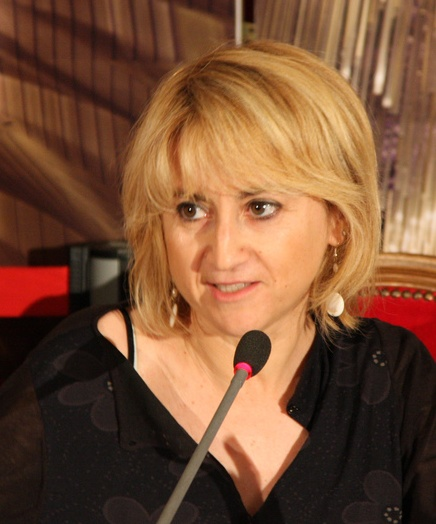
Luciana Littizzetto

Following the success of the Sanremo Music Festival 2013, since May of the same year, negotiations started to confirm Fabio Fazio and Luciana Littizzetto as the presenters for the contest in 2014. In September 2013, Fazio confirmed he would present the 64th Sanremo Music Festival, during an interview released to Italian newspaper Il Messaggero. A few days later, he confirmed Littizzetto as his co-presenter.

Mauro Pagani was later confirmed as the music director of the show. He also conducted the Sanremo Festival Orchestra during the contest. The scenography was created by Emanuela Trixie Zitkowsky, while Duccio Forzano was the television director of the show, as in 2013.

Italian television presenter Pif was also involved in the Sanremo Music Festival, presenting a 10-minutes pre-show titled Sanremo & Sanromolo.

== Selections ==
=== Newcomers' section ===
The selection process for the acts competing in the Newcomers' section included two different contests–Area Sanremo, which served to choose two of the eight entries for the contest, and Sanremo Giovani, a contest which selected six acts for the main competition.

==== Area Sanremo ====
Area Sanremo is a contest patrolled by the Comune di Sanremo. The 2013 edition was launched in October, and featured three days of lectures organized by Bruno Santori, followed by internal auditions. 323 acts entered the Area Sanremo competition. On 15 November 2014, the number of acts was reduced to 40 by a commission composed of singer-songwriters Ron and Omar Pedrini, and rapper Dargen D'Amico. The 8 winners of the contest—Lavinia Desideri, Le Gemelle Fontana, Bianca (pseudonym for Emma Fuggetta), Stefano Gelmini, Antonio Pirozzi, Juli (pseudonym for Giulia Saguatti), NaElia (pseudonym for Eliana Antonia Tumminelli) and Vadim (pseudonym for Vadim Valenti)—were announced on 11 December 2013. Among them, Vadim and Bianca were selected on 12 December 2013 by the artistic commission of the Sanremo Music Festival to become the first two confirmed acts of the 64th Sanremo Music Festival. During the same day, their songs, "La modernità" and "Saprei", respectively, were made available on RAI's website.

==== Sanremo Giovani ====
The remaining six contestants of the contest were directly selected by RAI through a different contest. Among the applications, 60 songs were pre-selected on 5 December 2013. Their songs were immediately made available through RAI's official website. Starting from 6 December 2013, live auditions were held in Rome, in front of a commission composed of president Mauro Pagani, Claudio Fasulo, Andrea Guerra, Massimo Martelli and Stefano Senardi. The selected acts and songs—Diodato with "Babilonia", Filippo Graziani with "Le cose belle", Rocco Hunt with "Nu juorno buono", The Niro with "1969", Veronica De Simone with "Nuvole che passano" and Zibba with "Senza di te"—were announced on 13 December 2013.

=== Big Artists section ===
The artists competing in the Big Artists section were chosen by RAI through an internal selection. The commission which screened the received songs included all the members of the artistic direction of the show—Fabio Fazio, Claudio Fasulo, Pietro Galeotti, Massimo Martelli, Francesco Piccolo, Stefano Senardi, Michele Serra—and was supervised by Mauro Pagani, musical director of the Sanremo Music Festival 2014. The chosen artists were announced by Fabio Fazio on 18 December 2014, during the 13.30 edition of Italian news-programme TG1. Immediately before reading the names of the 14 acts, Fazio shared a photo of the list through his Twitter account. During the same day, the titles of competing songs were revealed by RAI.

== Participants and results summary ==
Competing songs and artists, showing writers, orchestra conductor and results achieved
Big Artists section
Song	Artist(s)	Songwriter(s)	Orchestra conductor	Final rank	Sanremo Music Festival Awards
"Controvento"	Arisa	Giuseppe Anastasi	Saverio Lanza	1	Winner of the Big Artists Section
"Ora"	Renzo Rubino	Renzo Rubino; Andrea Rodini	Andrea Rodini	2	Second place in the Big Artists Section
"Liberi o no"	Raphael Gualazzi & The Bloody Beetroots	Raphael Gualazzi; Bob Cornelius Rifo; Leonardo Beccafichi	Daniele Parziani	3	Third place in the Big Artists Section
"Vivendo adesso"	Francesco Renga	Elisa Toffoli	Beppe Vessicchio	4	
"Bagnati dal sole"	Noemi	Veronica Scopelliti; Richard Frenneaux; Caroline Ailin	Enrico Melozzi	5	
"L'unica"	Perturbazione	Tommaso Cerasuolo; Gigi Giancursi; Rossano Lo Mele; Alex Baracco; Elena Diana; Cristiano Lo Mele	Andrea Mirò	6	Press, Radio & TV Award "Lucio Dalla"
"Il cielo è vuoto"	Cristiano De André	Diego Mancino; Cristiano De André; Dario Faini	Davide Rossi	7	
"Pedala"	Frankie hi-nrg mc	Francesco Di Gesú; Carolina Galbignani; Leonardo Beccafichi	Stefano Barzan	8	
"Ti porto a cena con me"	Giusy Ferreri	Roberto Casalino; Dario Faini	Beppe Vessicchio	9	
"Nel tuo sorriso"	Francesco Sarcina	Francesco Sarcina	Beppe Vessicchio	10	
"Così lontano"	Giuliano Palma	Nina Zilli; Marco Ciappelli; Alessandra Flora	Beppe Vessicchio	11	
"Da lontano"	Antonella Ruggiero	Antonella Ruggiero; Alessandro Graziano; Antonio Rossi; Roberto Colombo	Roberto Colombo	12	
"Sing in the Rain"	Ron	Rosalino Cellamare; Mattia Del Forno	Vittorio Cosma	13	
"Lentamente (Il primo che passa)"	Arisa	Cristina Donà; Rosalba Pippa; Saverio Lanza	Saverio Lanza	Eliminated	
"Tanto ci sei"	Raphael Gualazzi & The Bloody Beetroots	Giuliano Sangiorgi; Raphael Gualazzi; Bob Cornelius Rifo	Daniele Parziani	Eliminated	
"Per sempre e poi basta"	Renzo Rubino	Renzo Rubino; Andrea Rodini	Andrea Rodini	Eliminated	Best Arrangement Award
"A un isolato da te"	Francesco Renga	Roberto Casalino	Beppe Vessicchio	Eliminated	
"Un uomo è un albero"	Noemi	Veronica Scopelliti; Dario Faini; Diego Mancino	Enrico Melozzi	Eliminated	
"L'Italia vista dal bar"	Perturbazione	Tommaso Cerasuolo; Gigi Giancursi; Rossano Lo Mele; Alex Baracco; Elena Diana; Cristiano Lo Mele	Andrea Mirò	Eliminated	
"Invisibili"	Cristiano De André	Fabio Ferraboschi; Cristiano De André	Davide Rossi	Eliminated	Critic's Award "Mia Martini"; "Sergio Bardotti Award" for Best Lyrics
"Un uomo è vivo"	Frankie hi-nrg mc	Francesco Di Gesú; Carolina Galbignani; Leonardo Beccafichi	Stefano Barzan	Eliminated	
"L'amore possiede il bene"	Giusy Ferreri	Roberto Casalino; Niccolò Verrienti	Beppe Vessicchio	Eliminated	
"In questa città"	Francesco Sarcina	Francesco Sarcina	Beppe Vessicchio	Eliminated	
"Un bacio crudele"	Giuliano Palma	Cristiano Valli; Giuliano Palma; Fabio Merigo	Beppe Vessicchio	Eliminated	
"Quando balliamo"	Antonella Ruggiero	Simone Lenzi; Antonella Ruggiero; Roberto Colombo	Roberto Colombo	Eliminated	
"Un abbraccio unico"	Ron	Rosalino Cellamare	Vittorio Cosma	Eliminated	
"Una rigenerazione"	Riccardo Sinigallia	Filippo Gatti; Riccardo Sinigallia	Vittorio Cosma	Eliminated	
"Prima di andare via"	Riccardo Sinigallia	Filippo Gatti; Riccardo Sinigallia	Vittorio Cosma	Disqualified	
Newcomers section
Song	Artist(s)	Songwriter(s)	Orchestra conductor	Final rank	Sanremo Music Festival Awards
"Nu jurno buono"	Rocco Hunt	Rocco Pagliarulo; Alessandro Merli; Fabio Clemente	Roberto Rossi	1	Winner of the Newcomers' Section; Assomusica Award; Emanuele Luttazzi Award
"Babilonia"	Diodato	Antonio Diodato	Rodrigo D'Erasmo	2	Second place in the Newcomers' Section
"Senza di te"	Zibba	Sergio Vallarino; Andrea Balestrieri	Andrea Mirò	3	Third place in the Newcomers' section; Critic's Award "Mia Martini"; Press, Radio & TV Award "Lucio Dalla"
"1969"	The Niro	Davide Combusti	Roberto Poraccini	4	
"Le cose belle"	Filippo Graziani	Filippo Graziani	Beppe Vessicchio	Eliminated	
"Saprai"	Bianca	Alex Gaydou	Alex Gaydou	Eliminated	
"Nuvole che passano"	Veronica De Simone	Pietro Cantarelli	Pietro Cantarelli	Eliminated	
"La modernità"	Vadim	Vadim Valenti	Beppe Vessicchio	Eliminated	

== Shows ==
=== First night ===
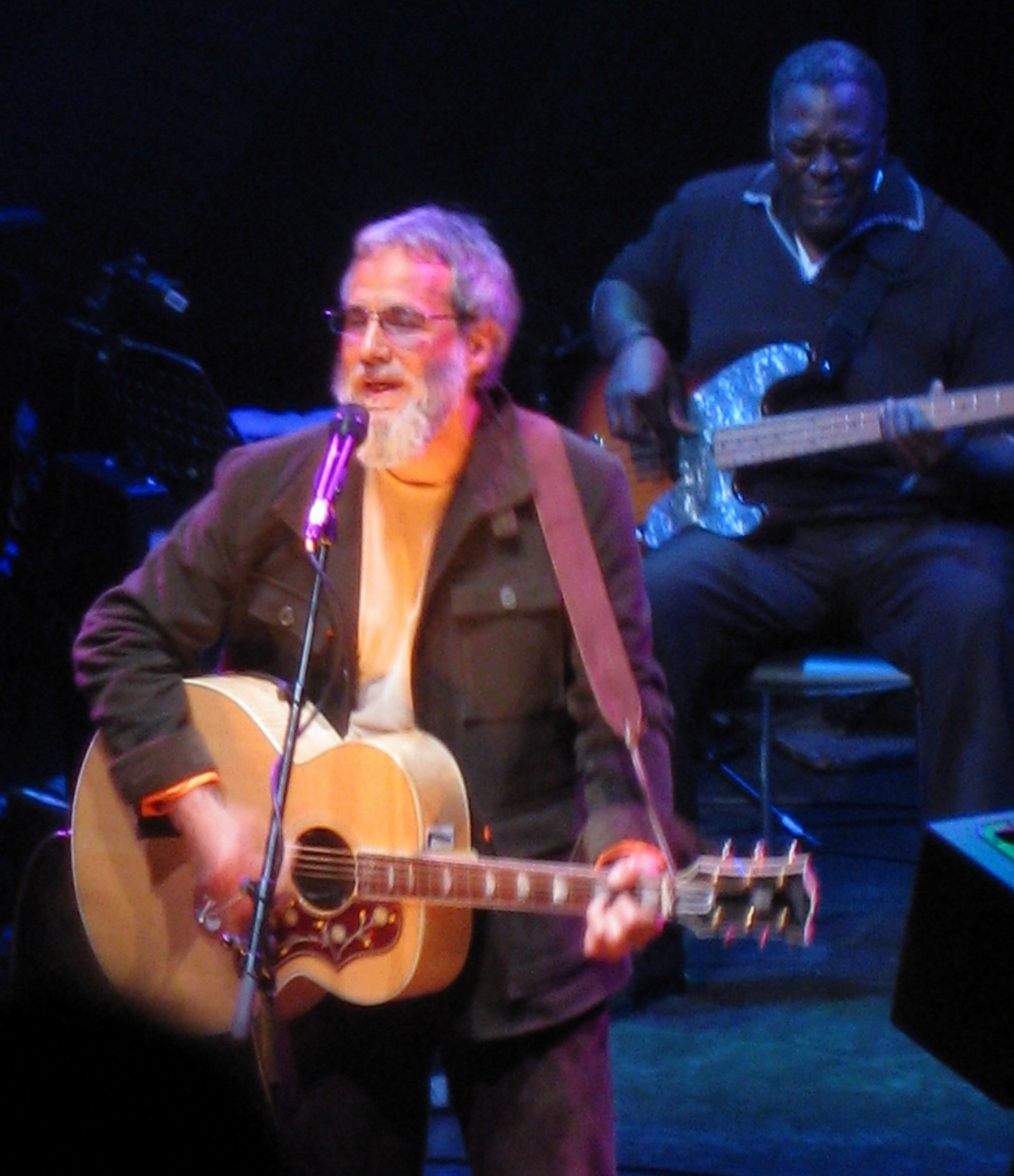
Cat Stevens was the international musical guest of the first night

During the first night, held on 18 February 2014, seven out of fourteen artists competing in the Big Artists section presented their two songs. At the end of the night, a song for each artist was eliminated, as a result of televotes combined with votes given by music journalists. For each competing act, the chosen song was announced by a different presenter.

The night was opened by a monologue by Fazio, which was interrupted by the suicide threat of a man protesting against unemployment and economic conditions in Campania. After returning to the show, Fazio paid tribute to Italian singer-songwriter Fabrizio De André, together with his widow, Dori Ghezzi. Luciano Ligabue then performed De André's "Creuza de mä", togher with music director Mauro Pagani.

The second guest of the night was French actress and model Laetitia Casta, who promoted her film Una donna per amica. During a sketch, Fazio performed "Ne me quitte pas" for her, while she sang Domenico Modugno's "Meraviglioso". After performing a choreography based on Alberto Sordi and Monica Vitti's "Ma 'n do'... Hawaii", Casta joined Fazio for a tribute to Italian singer Enzo Jannacci, who ended with the appearance of Enzo's son, Paolo.

After Raphael Gualazzi & The Bloody Beetroots performances, Raffaella Carrà appeared on stage, singing "Fun Fun Fun" and "Cha Cha Ciao". She also dueted with Luciana Littizzetto, performing "Rumore". Carrà also promoted the second season of the talent show The Voice of Italy, in which she appears as a coach. The last guest of the night was Cat Stevens, who performed "Peace Train", "Maybe There's a World" and a cover of The Beatles' "All You Need Is Love".

==== Big Artists performances during the first night ====
Performances of the acts in the "Big Artists" section during the first night, with competing songs and voting results
Artist	Order	Song	Voting details				Winning entry presenter(s)
Artist	Order	Song	Journalists	Televotes	Total	Result	Winning entry presenter(s)
Arisa	1	"Lentamente (Il primo che passa)"	28.30%	44.46%	36.38%	Eliminated	Tito Stagno
Arisa	2	"Controvento"	71.70%	55.54%	63.62%	Advanced	Tito Stagno
Frankie hi-nrg mc	3	"Un uomo è vivo"	25.00%	26.27%	25.64%	Eliminated	Tania Cagnotto, Francesca Dallapè
Frankie hi-nrg mc	4	"Pedala"	75.00%	73.73%	74.37%	Advanced	Tania Cagnotto, Francesca Dallapè
Antonella Ruggiero	5	"Quando balliamo"	25.47%	39.13%	32.30%	Eliminated	Amaurys Pérez
Antonella Ruggiero	6	"Da lontano"	74.53%	60.87%	67.70%	Advanced	Amaurys Pérez
Raphael Gualazzi & The Bloody Beetroots	7	"Tanto ci sei"	22.52%	52.21%	37.37%	Eliminated	Luigi Naldini
Raphael Gualazzi & The Bloody Beetroots	8	"Liberi o no"	77.48%	47.79%	62.63%	Advanced	Luigi Naldini
Cristiano De André	9	"Invisibili"	54.55%	40.15%	47.35%	Eliminated	Cristiana Capotondi
Cristiano De André	10	"Il cielo è vuoto"	45.45%	59.85%	52.65%	Advanced	Cristiana Capotondi
Perturbazione	11	"L'unica"	77.00%	70.79%	73.90%	Advanced	Massimo Gramellini
Perturbazione	12	"L'Italia vista dal bar"	23.00%	29.21%	26.10%	Eliminated	Massimo Gramellini
Giusy Ferreri	13	"L'amore possiede il bene"	44.76%	40.97%	42.87%	Eliminated	Marco Bocci
Giusy Ferreri	14	"Ti porto a cena con me"	55.24%	59.03%	57.13%	Advanced	Marco Bocci

=== Second night ===
The second night of the contest took place on 19 February 2014. The show was based on the selection of one song for each of the seven acts in the Big Artists section which did not perform during the previous night. Each act performed two entries, among which only one advanced in the competition, as a result of televotes combined with votes given by music journalists. As for the first night, the winning entry was announced by a different guest for each act. During the second night, the competition for the Newcomers' section was launched. In the final part of the show, four newcomers performed their entries and, after receiving votes by journalists and by the public, two of them were eliminated from the competition.

The first musical guest of the night was actor Claudio Santamaria, promoting the fiction Non è mai troppo tardi, based on the story of Italian school teacher Alberto Manzi. The Kessler Twins later appeared on stage, singing and dancing the track "Quelli belli come noi" with co-presenter Luciana Littizzetto. After Renzo Rubino's performances, Italian actress Franca Valeri acted the part of her character Sora Cesira, and later performed a sketch with Littizzetto. Italian singer-songwriter Claudio Baglioni was the first musical guest of the night. He performed the songs "Questo piccolo grande amore", "E tu", "Strada facendo", "Avrai", "Mille giorni di te e di me" and "Con voi", and he was also interviewed by Fazio. The international guest of the night was Rufus Wainwright, which appeared onstage at the end of Big Artists competition, before the launch of the performances for the acts of the Newcomers' section. He performed the songs "Cigarettes and Chocolate Milk" and The Beatles' "Across the Universe".

==== Big Artists performances during the second night ====
Performances of the acts in the "Big Artists" section during the second night, with competing songs and voting results
Artist	Order	Song	Voting details				Winning entry presenter(s)
Artist	Order	Song	Journalists	Televotes	Total	Result	Winning entry presenter(s)
Francesco Renga	1	"A un isolato da te"	41.67%	45.49%	43.58%	Eliminated	Alice Kessler, Ellen Kessler
Francesco Renga	2	"Vivendo adesso"	58.33%	54.51%	56.42%	Advanced	Alice Kessler, Ellen Kessler
Giuliano Palma	3	"Così lontano"	47.24%	69.25%	58.25%	Advanced	Armin Zöggeler
Giuliano Palma	4	"Un bacio crudele"	52.76%	30.75%	41.75%	Eliminated	Armin Zöggeler
Noemi	5	"Un uomo è un albero"	19.83%	48.31%	34.07%	Eliminated	Cristiana Collu
Noemi	6	"Bagnati dal sole"	80.17%	51.69%	65.93%	Advanced	Cristiana Collu
Renzo Rubino	7	"Ora"	57.02%	49.23%	53.13%	Advanced	Kasia Smutniak
Renzo Rubino	8	"Per sempre e poi basta"	42.98%	50.77%	46.87%	Eliminated	Kasia Smutniak
Ron	9	"Un abbraccio unico"	36.67%	49.95%	43.31%	Eliminated	Gian Antonio Stella
Ron	10	"Sing in the Rain"	63.33%	50.05%	56.69%	Advanced	Gian Antonio Stella
Riccardo Sinigallia	11	"Prima di andare via"	58.12%	82.78%	70.45%	Advanced	Veronica Angeloni
Riccardo Sinigallia	12	"Una rigenerazione"	41.88%	17.22%	29.55%	Eliminated	Veronica Angeloni
Francesco Sarcina	13	"Nel tuo sorriso"	57.14%	84.54%	70.84%	Advanced	Clemente Russo
Francesco Sarcina	14	"In questa città"	42.86%	15.46%	29.16%	Eliminated	Clemente Russo

==== Newcomers' performances during the second night ====
Performances of the acts in the Newcomers' section during the second night, with competing songs and voting results
Artist	Order	Song	Voting details			
Artist	Order	Song	Journalists	Televotes	Total	Result
Diodato	1	"Babilonia"	28.70%	30.52%	29.60%	Advanced
Filippo Graziani	2	"Le cose belle"	26.52%	30.30%	28.41%	Eliminated
Bianca	3	"Saprai"	10.00%	13.09%	11.55%	Eliminated
Zibba	4	"Senza di te"	34.78%	26.09%	30.44%	Advanced

=== Third night ===
==== Big Artists performances during the third night ====
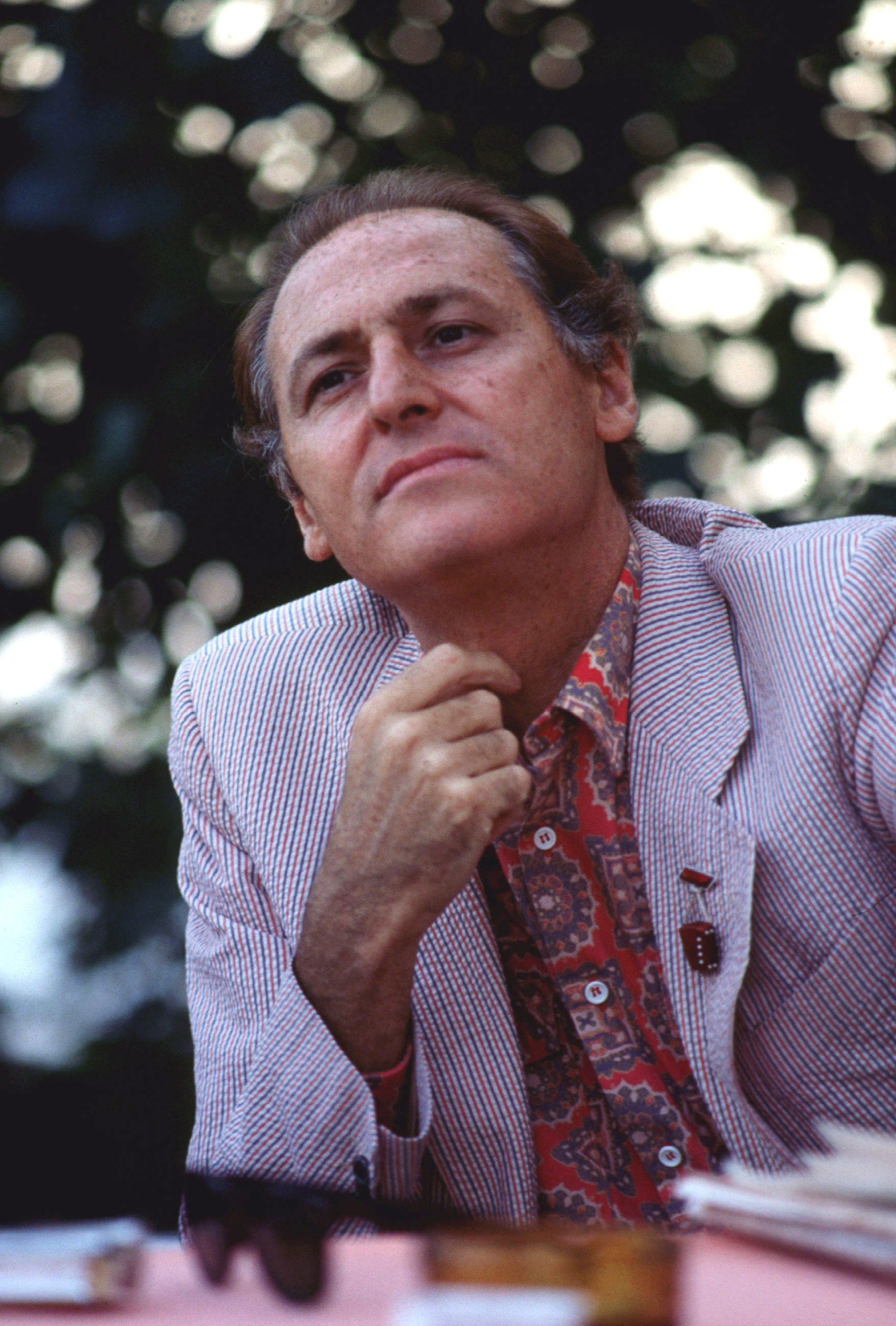
Renzo Arbore was one of the main guests of the third night

During the third night, the selected song of each act competing in the Big Artists section was performed again, and a first ranking was compiled, based on public votes only, with Francesco Renga's "Vivendo adesso" in the first spot. At the end of the night, the last four acts of the Newcomers' section performed their entries and, after being voted by journalists and by the public, two of them advanced to the final round of the competition, while the remaining ones were eliminated.

The show started with a tribute to Claudio Abbado, with musicians of the Philharmonic Orchestra of the La Fenice opera house, directed by Diego Matheuz, performing the overture from Mozart's The Marriage of Figaro. Luciana Littizzetto later performed a monologue about beauty and diversity. At the end of her piece, German dancer Dergin Tokmak, which lost the use of his legs as a child, performed an acrobatic dance with his crutches. After a monologue by arts critic Flavio Caroli, the a cappella group Shai Fishman and The A Cappella All Stars made the scene with a fake show interruption, performing a medley of popular international songs. Italian showman Renzo Arbore was another guest of the night. He performed his hit "Ma la notte no", from his 1985 TV programme Quelli della notte, and Roberto Murolo's "Reginella" and "Come facette mammeta". At the end of the performances of the acts competing in the Big Artists section, astronaut Luca Parmitano was interviews by Fazio. Later, Irish singer Damien Rice performed his songs "Cannonball" and "The Blower's Daughter".

Performances of the acts in the "Big Artists" section during the third night
Artist	Order	Song	Voting details	
Artist	Order	Song	Televotes	Rank
Renzo Rubino	1	"Ora"	9.49%	3
Giusy Ferreri	2	"Ti porto a cena con me"	6.67%	7
Frankie hi nrg mc	3	"Pedala"	4.33%	14
Raphael Gualazzi & The Bloody Beetroots	4	"Liberi o no"	8.62%	5
Cristiano De André	5	"Il cielo è vuoto"	7.97%	6
Francesco Sarcina	6	"Nel tuo sorriso"	4.88%	11
Perturbazione	7	"L'unica"	9.27%	4
Francesco Renga	8	"Vivendo adesso"	16.15%	1
Riccardo Sinigallia	9	"Prima di andare via"	—N/a^{[A]}	10
Noemi	10	"Bagnati dal sole"	5.31%	9
Antonella Ruggiero	11	"Da lontano"	6.17%	8
Arisa	12	"Controvento"	11.87%	2
Ron	13	"Sing in the Rain"	4.46%	13
Giuliano Palma	14	"Così lontano"	4.81%	12

==== Newcomers' performances during the third night ====
Performances of the acts in the Newcomers' section during the second night, with competing songs and voting results
Artist	Order	Song	Voting details			
Artist	Order	Song	Journalists	Televotes	Total	Result
Rocco Hunt	1	"Nu jurno buono"	37.38%	88.13%	62.76%	Advanced
Veronica De Simone	2	"Nuvole che passano"	22.43%	6.38%	14.40%	Eliminated
The Niro	3	"1969"	26.64%	3.69%	15.16%	Advanced
Vadim	4	"La modernità"	13.55%	1.80%	7.68%	Eliminated

=== Fourth night ===
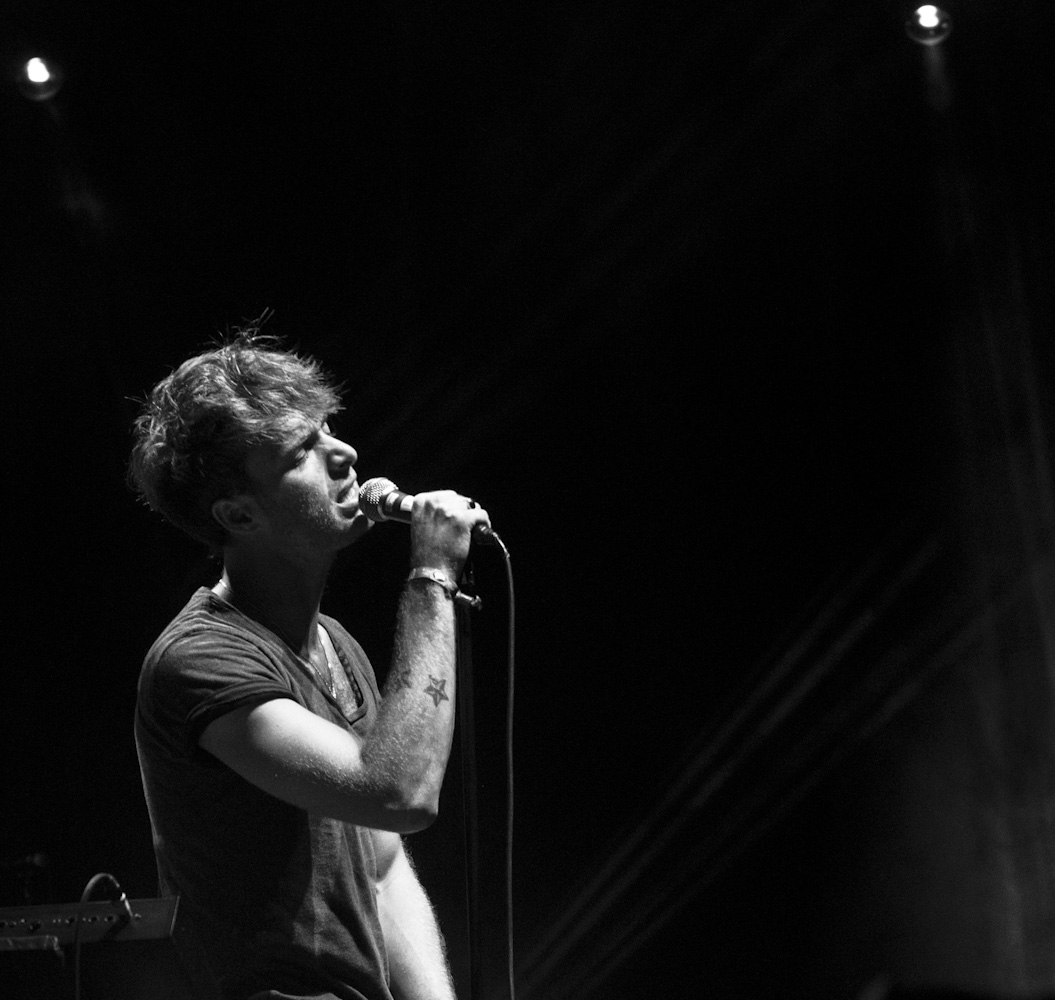
Scottish singer Paolo Nutini tributed Lucio Dalla performing "Caruso"

During the fourth night of the contest, each act competing in the Big Artists section performed, together with optional guests, a song from a popular Italian singer-songwriter, as part of the "Sanremo Club" night, an out-of-competition tribute to Italian cantautori. During the night, the final round of the Newcomers' section also took place, with Rocco Hunt placing first with his entry "Nu jurno buono".

The show began with Marco Mengoni performing a cover of Sergio Endrigo's "Io che amo solo te". After five performances of the acts competing in the Big Artists section, Italian illusionist Silvan performed a piece with presenter Luciana Littizzetto. Singer Gino Paoli also took part in the show, performing with pianist Danilo Rea the songs "Vedrai vedrai", Umberto Bindi's "Il nostro concerto", and his popular hit "Il cielo in una stanza". The international guest of the night was Scottish singer Paolo Nutini, who performed a cover of Lucio Dalla's "Caruso", as well as his own songs "Candy" and "Scream (Funk My Life Up)".

==== Big Artists performances during the fourth night ====
Performances of the contestants of the Big Artists section on the fourth night
Artist(s)	Guest artist(s)	Order	Song	Tributed singer-songwriter
Perturbazione	Violante Placido	1	"La donna cannone"	Francesco De Gregori
Francesco Sarcina	Riccardo Scamarcio	2	"Diavolo in me"	Zucchero
Frankie hi nrg mc	Fiorella Mannoia	3	"Boogie"	Paolo Conte
Noemi	—N/a	4	"La costruzione di un amore"	Ivano Fossati
Francesco Renga	Francesco "Kekko" Silvestre	5	"Un giorno credi"	Edoardo Bennato
Ron	Andrea Pica	6	"Cara"	Lucio Dalla
Arisa	WhoMadeWho	7	"Cuccurucucù"	Franco Battiato
Raphael Gualazzi & The Bloody Beetroots	Tommy Lee	8	"Nel blu dipinto di blu"	Domenico Modugno
Cristiano De André	—N/a	9	"Verranno a chiederti del nostro amore"	Fabrizio De André
Renzo Rubino	Simona Molinari	10	"Non arrossire"	Giorgio Gaber
Giusy Ferreri	Alessio Boni & Alessandro Haber	11	"Il mare d'inverno"	Enrico Ruggeri
Antonella Ruggiero	DigiEnsamble Berlin	12	"Una miniera"	New Trolls
Giuliano Palma	—N/a	13	"I say i’ sto cca"	Pino Daniele
Riccardo Sinigallia	Marina Rei, Paola Turci & Laura Arzilli	14	"Ho visto anche degli zingari felici"	Claudio Lolli

==== Newcomers' performances during the fourth night – Final ====
Performances of the acts in the Newcomers' section during the fourth night, with competing songs and voting results
Artist	Order	Song	Voting details			
Artist	Order	Song	Jury^{[B]}	Televotes	Total	Result
Diodato	1	"Babilonia"	47.00%	11.24%	29.12%	Second place
Zibba	2	"Senza di te"	20.00%	10.69%	15.35%	Third place
Rocco Hunt	3	"Nu jurno buono"	11.00%	75.03%	43.01%	Winner
The Niro	4	"1969"	22.00%	3.04%	12.52%	Fourth place

=== Fifth night ===
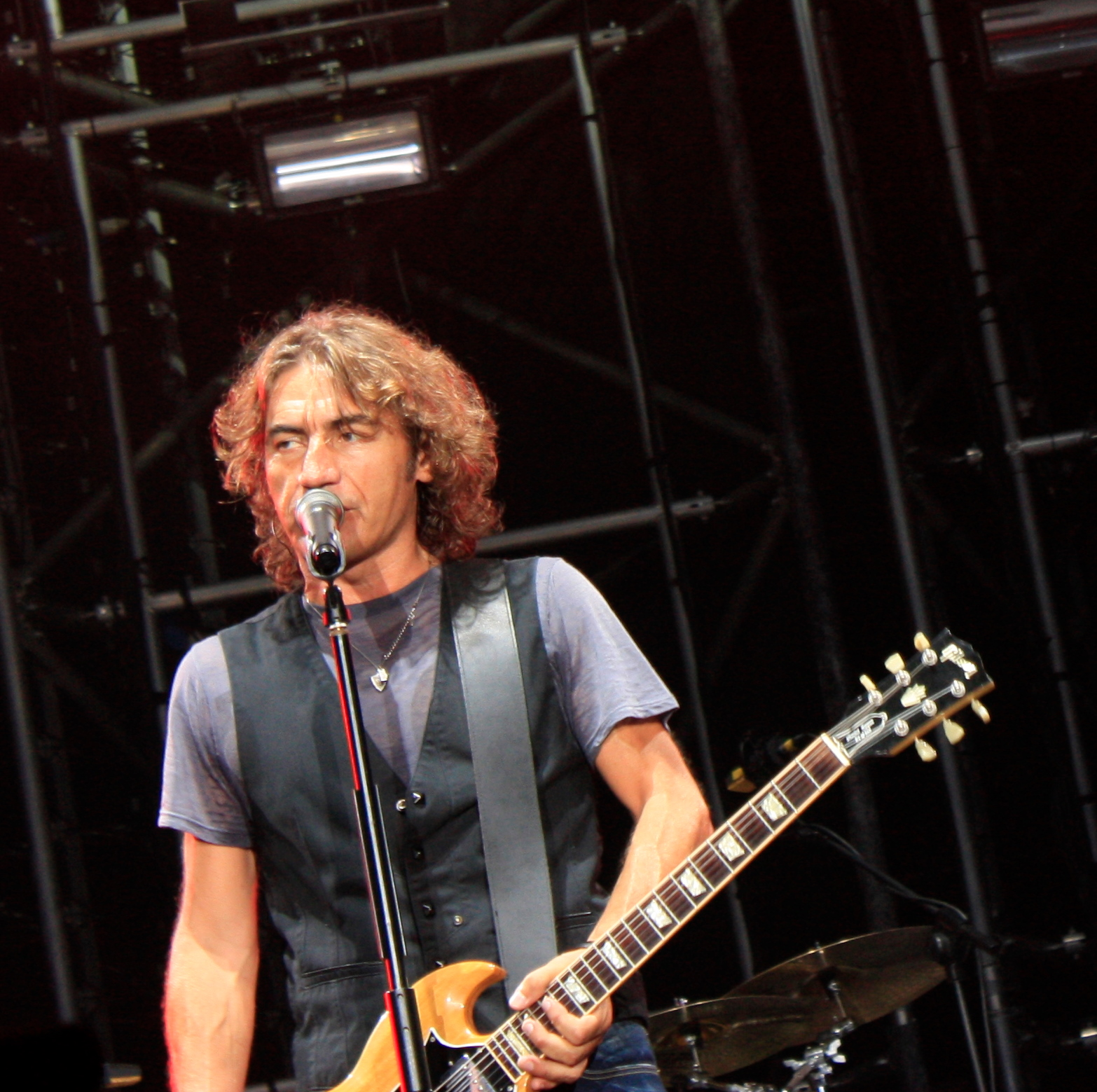
Luciano Ligabue was a guest of the final

The final night of the competition was divided in two different rounds. During the first round, the acts in the Big Artists section, except disqualified Riccardo Sinigallia, performed their entries still in competition. A ranking was compiled, based on votes received during the third night, as well as on the public votes received during the final, and on points awarded by the jury. The top-three acts advanced to the last round of the competition, in which public vote and jury votes were combined to compose the final ranking. As a result, Arisa's "Controvento" was announced as the winner of the competition.

The night was opened by Terence Hill, which appeared on stage wearing the clothes of his character Don Matteo, from the television series with same name. Hill performed a sketch with Littizzetto and Fazio, which ended with presenters performing a cover of "Un corpo e un'anima", originally sung by Wess and Dori Ghezzi. Actor Maurizio Crozza, which received criticism by the public when he appeared as a guest during the previous edition of the contest, appeared on stage pretending to be afraid of the public's reaction, and later performed a monologue inspired by the show's main theme, beauty. At the end of his performance, he impersonated Italian Prime Minister Matteo Renzi. Luciano Ligabue appeared as a guest for the second time, after opening the first episode. He performed his songs "Certe notti", "Il giorno di dolore che uno ha", "Il sale della terra" and "Per sempre". After being interviewed by Fazio, actress Claudia Cardinale announced the winners of the Critic's Award "Mia Martini" and of the TV, Radio and TV award "Lucio Dalla"—Cristiano De André's "Invisibili" and Perturbazione's "L'unica", respectively. Despite being disqualified from the competition, Riccardo Sinigallia was allowed to perform his entry "Prima di andare via", at the end of the first round of the final. Before the performances of the last round of the competition, all the eight acts of the Newcomers' section were allowed to sing a reduced version of their entries.

==== Big Artists performances during the fifth night – Round 1 ====
Performances of the acts in the "Big Artists" section during the first round of the fifth night
Artist	Order	Song	Voting details					
Artist	Order	Song	Televotes (3rd night)	Televotes (5th night)	Jury^{[B]}	Total	Rank	Result
Giuliano Palma	1	"Così lontano"	4.81%	5.71%	1.00%	3.13%	11	Eliminated
Noemi	2	"Bagnati dal sole"	5.31%	8.31%	11.00%	8.90%	5	Eliminated
Ron	3	"Sing in the Rain"	4.46%	3.68%	1.00%	2.53%	13	Eliminated
Arisa	4	"Controvento"	11.87%	18.91%	24.00%	19.70%	1	Advanced
Francesco Sarcina	5	"Nel tuo sorriso"	4.88%	5.31%	1.50%	3.30%	10	Eliminated
Perturbazione	6	"L'unica"	9.27%	7.20%	8.50%	8.37%	6	Eliminated
Giusy Ferreri	7	"Ti porto a cena con me"	6.67%	4.33%	1.50%	3.50%	9	Eliminated
Francesco Renga	8	"Vivendo adesso"	16.15%	18.27%	6.00%	11.61%	4	Eliminated
Renzo Rubino	9	"Ora"	9.49%	7.15%	19.50%	13.91%	2	Advanced
Antonella Ruggiero	10	"Da lontano"	6.17%	4.10%	0.50%	2.82%	12	Eliminated
Raphael Gualazzi & The Bloody Beetroots	11	"Liberi o no"	8.62%	6.79%	17.50%	12.60%	3	Advanced
Cristiano De André	12	"Il cielo è vuoto"	7.97%	7.03%	4.00%	5.75%	7	Eliminated
Frankie hi nrg mc	13	"Pedala"	4.33%	3.21%	4.00%	3.88%	8	Eliminated

==== Big Artists performances during the fifth night – Final round ====
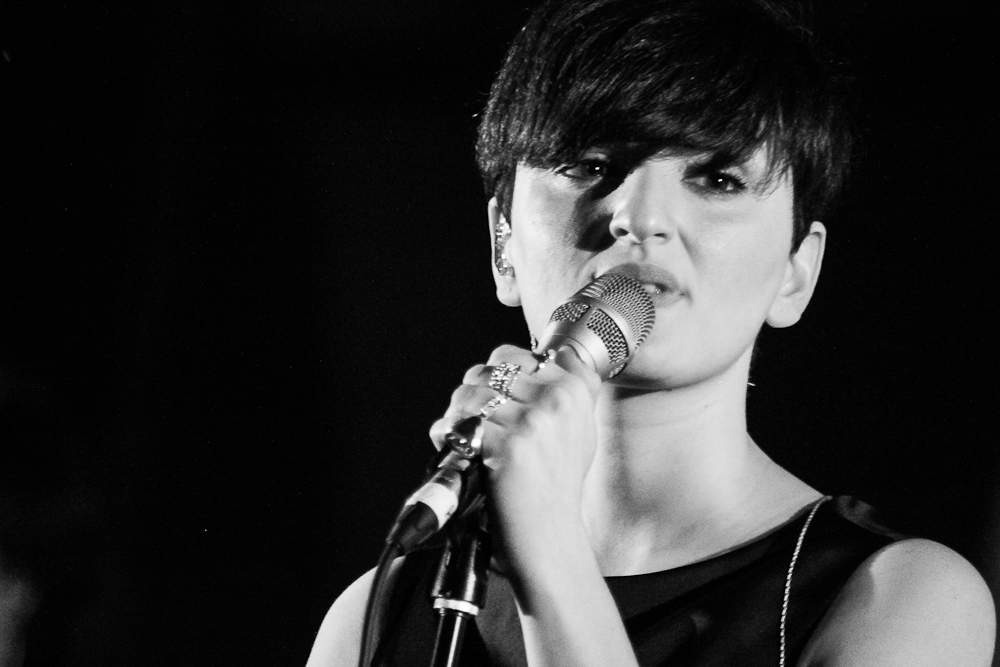
Arisa's "Controvento" was the winning song of the Sanremo Music Festival 2014 in the Big Artists section

Performances of the acts in the "Big Artists" section during the final round of the fifth night
Artist	Order	Song	Voting details			
Artist	Order	Song	Televotes	Jury^{[B]}	Total	Result
Renzo Rubino	1	"Ora"	19.51%	28.33%	23.92%	Third place
Raphael Gualazzi & The Bloody Beetroots	2	"Liberi o no"	22.93%	30.00%	26.47%	Second place
Arisa	3	"Controvento"	57.56%	41.67%	49.61%	Winner

== Other awards ==
=== Critics' Award "Mia Martini" – Big Artists section ===
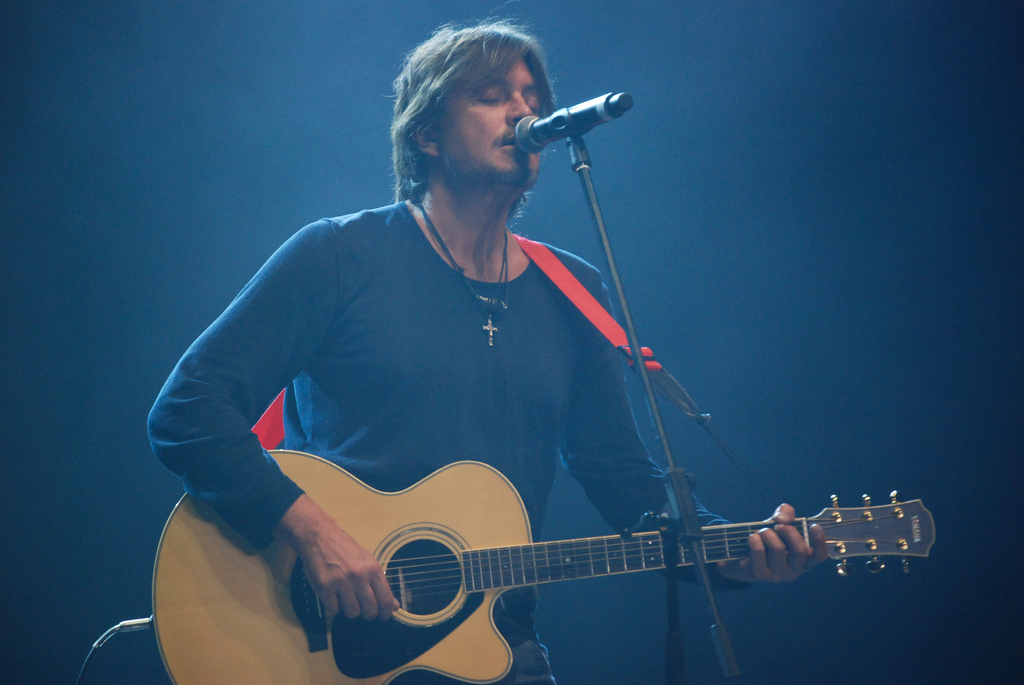
Despite being eliminated during the first night, Cristiano De André's song "Invisibili" received the Critics' Award "Mia Martini"

Points received by the "Big Artists" for the Critics Award
Artist	Song	Points	Result
Cristiano De André	"Invisibili"	42	Winner
Perturbazione	"L'unica"	15	Second place
Renzo Rubino	"Ora"	8	Third place

=== Critics' Award "Mia Martini" – Newcomers' section ===
Points received by the "Newcomers" for the Critics Award
Artist	Song	Points	Result
Zibba	"Senza di te"	42	Winner
Rocco Hunt	"Nu jurnu buono"	24	Second place
Diodato	"Babilonia"	20	Third place
The Niro	"1969"	11	Fourth place
Filippo Graziani	"Le cose belle"	9	Fifth place
Bianca	"Saprai"	1	Sixth place
Veronica De Simone	"Nuvole che passano"	1	Sixth place
Vadim	"La modernità"	0	Eighth place

=== Press, Radio & TV Award "Lucio Dalla" – Big Artists section ===
Points received by the "Big Artists" for the Press, Radio & TV Award
Artist	Song	Points	Result
Perturbazione	"L'unica"	31	Winner
Arisa	"Controvento"	12	Second place
Noemi	"Bagnati dal sole"	10	Third place
Renzo Rubino	"Ora"	10	Third place
Raphael Gualazzi & The Bloody Beetroots	"Liberi o no"	9	Fifth place
Cristiano De André	"Il cielo è vuoto"	8	Sixth place
Francesco Renga	"Vivendo adesso"	8	Sixth place
Antonella Ruggiero	"Da lontano"	4	Eighth place
Frankie hi-nrg mc	"Pedala"	3	Ninth place
Ron	"Sing in the Rain"	3	Ninth place
Giusy Ferreri	"Ti porto a cena con me"	2	Eleventh place
Giuliano Palma	"Così lontano"	2	Eleventh place
Francesco Sarcina	"Nel tuo sorriso"	2	Eleventh place
Riccardo Sinigallia	"Prima di andare via"	1	Fourteenth place

=== Press, Radio & TV Award "Lucio Dalla" – Newcomers' section ===
Points received by the "Newcomers" for the Press, Radio & TV Award
Artist	Song	Points	Result
Zibba	"Senza di te"	37	Winner
Rocco Hunt	"Nu jurnu buono"	26	Second place
Diodato	"Babilonia"	13	Third place
The Niro	"1969"	13	Fourth place
Bianca	"Saprai"	8	Fifth place
Filippo Graziani	"Le cose belle"	5	Sixth place
Veronica De Simone	"Nuvole che passano"	3	Seventh place
Vadim	"La modernità"	1	Eighth place

== Ratings ==
Episode	Date	Viewers	Share
Night 1	18 February 2014	10,938,738	46.09%
Night 2	19 February 2014	7,711,000	33.95%
Night 3	20 February 2014	7,673,000	34.93%
Night 4	21 February 2014	8,188,000	37.97%
Night 5	22 February 2014	9,348,000	43.51%

== Notes ==
- A Riccardo Sinigallia's entry "Prima di andare via" was disqualified from the competition after it was revealed the song had been performed by Sinigallia himself during a concert in the months preceding the show, breaking the rules of the Festival, which don't allow competing songs to be released or publicly performed before the beginning of the Festival itself. Sinigallia ranked tenth during the second night but, after his disqualification, RAI considered invalid the votes he received and did not reveal the percentage of public votes he received during the night.
- B The jury voting during the final for the Newcomers' section and for the Big Artists section was composed of: Paolo Virzì (president), Silvia Avallone, Paolo Jannacci, Piero Maranghi, Aldo Nove, Lucia Ocone, Silvio Orlando, Giorgia Surina, Rocco Tanica and Anna Tifu.
