= Buzzanca =

Buzzanca is a surname of Italian origin. Notable people with the surname include:

- Gino Buzzanca (1912–1985), Italian actor
- Lando Buzzanca (1935–2022), Italian actor
- Matteo Buzzanca (born 1973), Italian musician, composer, and record producer
