= Matteo Buzzanca =

- Born: 28 September 1973 (age 52); Rome, Italy
- Genres: Soundtrack
- Occupations: Musician; composer; record producer
- Instruments: Piano; guitar
- Years active: 1996–present
- Website: http://www.teodorf.com

Matteo Buzzanca, also known by the pseudonym Teodorf, (born 28 September 1973) is an Italian musician, composer and record producer.

== Biography ==
His work revolves around the creation of songs and soundtracks. He has made arrangements and written songs for various albums and he has produced music for documentaries, exposures, theatrical events, commercials, short films and films, not only in Italy but also abroad.

He has written songs for X Factor Italia, The Voice of Italy and artists such as Max Gazzè, Emma Marrone, Marco Mengoni, Luca Carboni, Malika Ayane, Patty Pravo, Raphael Gualazzi, Noemi, Giusy Ferreri, Francesca Michielin and Zero Assoluto.

He graduated in Application of Music, from Rovigo's Conservatorio F. Venezze, with the maximum of marks and distinction he has also graduated in Economy and Business from the Università degli Studi Cà Foscari, in Venice.

Since 2015 he has been professor of Sound for Movies in Milan's SAE Institute.

He currently is an exclusive author for Sugar Music.

== Author and producer for other artists ==
Between the years 2002 and 2007' he collaborated with the singer songwriter Andrea Chimenti to create two albums, Il porto sepolto (as arranger) and Vietato Morire (co-author, arranger and producer). In the same year he collaborated with Paolo Benvegnù to arrange the arches of Il mare Verticale, a piece that he co-signed and that was subsequently interpreted by Giusy Ferreri in the album Fotografie and by Marina Rei in the album Musa.

2012 – He was co-author of a few songs in Diego Mancino's record E' necessario. In 2011 he composed, with Diego Mancino, the single Odio tutti I cantanti, for Noemi.

2013 – At the Sanremo music festival with the song I tuoi maledettissimi, written with Francesco Gazzè and sung by Max Gazzè.

2015 – He wrote two songs for Marco Mengoni's album Parole in circolo, and three pieces for Malika Ayane's Naif, such as the single Senza fare sul serio (certified double platinum).

2016

- He produced Raphael Gualazzi's album Love Life Peace, that was awarded gold record due to its success in the Italian radio charts with the single L'estate di John Wayne.
- He was co-author, with Alessandro Raina, of Luca Carboni's single Bologna è una regola, which obtained great success on the radio charts.
- He produced Gianluca De Rubertis's single Prima del tuo cuore (Il Genio), with Amanda Lear's participation.
- With Ermal Meta he wrote Emma Marrone's Arriverà l'amore (platinum record), and Un cuore in due for Francesca Michielin.

2017

- He wrote the soundtrack for a film produced by the Centro Sperimentale del Cinema di Roma.
- He wrote and produced, with Alessandro Raina, Raphael Gualazzi's new single "La Fine Del Mondo", added to the new international edition of the album "Love Life Peace".

=== Awards ===
- L'estate di John Wayne (Raphael Gualazzi) – platinum record – 2016
- Un cuore in due (Francesca Michielin) – gold record – 2016
- Bologna è una regola (Luca Carboni) – gold record – 2016
- Arriverà l'amore (Emma Marrone) – platinum record – 2015
- Senza fare sul serio (Malika Ayane) – triple platinum – 2015

== Music composer for the media ==
In 2002 he created music for his first short film with Marco Ruffatti "Ghosts" that participates to the screenings criteria in the Mostra Internazionale d'Arte Cinematografica. He also worked on the music in MariaErica Pacileo's "L'ultima stagione", short film presented at Torino Videoevento.

Between 2003 and 2006 he composed various soundtracks for "Lontano dal silenzio del cielo" that participates at Valdarno Cinema Fedic, "Resistenti: cinque ritratti partigiani" by Fernando Maraghini, "La disfatta" by Guido Geminiani and "Annarosa non muore", a documentary about the Bellunese partisan resistance and it participates in the 2003 Bellaria Film Festival. He also creates music for two exhibitions set up at Mart Museo in Trento, "Mitomacchina" and "il bello e le bestie", and "la Virtù della Fortezza" in Castel Beseno.

In 2007 he worked in Los Angeles for the music of Vivian Lee Moore's short film The Devil's in the details and for Abhishek Kabli's short film, For the game, both were presented at the Festival On the Lot. He also composed sound-design for exhibitions, such as Giampiero Brunetta's Cosmorama Cinematografico held in the Palazzo dei Normanni in Palermo, and also for the exhibition "La scimmia nuda" held in the Museo di Scienze Naturali Tridentino.

Between the years 2008 and 2010 he composed music for a few projects: "Stagione di caccia" by Andrea Mugnaini and produced by Studio Universal, Charlie Tango's Time up and for Federico Massa's documentary regarding the story of calcio Padova, "Cent'anni di emozioni biancoscudate". He created the soundtrack for the theatrical show Callas, a tragedy by Ottavia Lanza for the teatro Litta of Milan.

In 2011 he created music for the documentary Lacor, by the Canadians Vincent Scotti and Dominique Morisette discussing the touching story of Mary's Hospital of Lacor in Uganda, founded by the couple Piero Corti and Lucille Corti. The same year he also created music for "Guardiamoci negli occhi", national campaign against glaucoma, and for Federico Massa's historical documentary Zorzi da Castelfranco.

In 2012 he wrote the original soundtrack for Andrea Mugnaini's film Non c'è tempo per gli eroi, interpreted by Desiree Noferini and Paolo Bernardini, produced by Cecchi Gori Home Video. For the occasion he also wrote the piece This is not Love, with Francesca Lago's lyrics, interpreted by the English singer Cass Lowe.

In 2015 he composed "Le tango de Zara", interpreted by the Orchestra di piazza Vittorio, for the soundtrack of Fariborz Kamkari's film" Pitza e Datteri". In 2014 he created music for the work of the sculptor Ettore Greco, I bambini sono cattivi, at the Mostra Ecce Pinocchio, held in la Villa di Isola di Garda.

== The soloist project Teodorf ==
In 2015 he published the debut album of his soloist project Teodorf (a mix of electronic music, shoegaze and newwave) created between London and Rome and mixed by Ken Thomas, English eclectic producer and sound engineer (Sigur Ros, Moby, Dave Gahan). The debut single is called Why and the provocative videoclip was accomplished by Tiziano Russo.

== Credit as author of songs ==
Year	Title	Artist	Album
2004	Il mare verticale	Paolo Benvegnù	Piccoli Fragilissimi Film
2009	Il mare verticale	Marina Rei	Musa
2009	Il mare verticale	Giusy Ferreri	Fotografie
2010	L'estate	Non voglio che Clara	Dei cani
2011	Odio tutti i cantanti	Noemi	RossoNoemi
2011	Qualcosa cambierà	Andrea Chimenti	Tempesta di fiori
2012	Nei baci no	Diego Mancino	È necessario
2012	Qui è così	Diego Mancino	È necessario
2012	Colpa della musica	Diego Mancino	È necessario
2013	A fuoco	Timothy Cavicchini	The Voice of Italy
2013	I tuoi maledettissimi impegni	Max Gazzè	Sotto casa
2014	Dove	Zero Assoluto	Alla fine del giorno
2015	Tutto quello che ci resta	Leiner Riflessi	XFactor Italia
2015	Senza fare sul serio	Malika Ayane	Naif
2015	Ansia di felicità	Malika Ayane	Naif
2015	Dimentica domani	Malika Ayane	Naif
2015	Se sei come sei	Marco Mengoni	Parole in circolo
2015	Invincibile	[Marco Mengoni	Parole in circolo
2015	Un cuore in due	Francesca Michielin	Di20
2015	Arriverà l'amore	Emma Marrone	Adesso
2015	Da domani	Giovanni Caccamo	Non siamo soli
2016	Bologna è una regola	Luca Carboni	Pop-up
2016	Ci rivedremo poi	Patty Pravo	Eccomi
2016	L'estate di John Wayne	Raphael Gualazzi	Love Life Peace
2016	Mondello beach	Raphael Gualazzi	Love Life Peace
2016	Splende il mattino	Raphael Gualazzi	Love Life Peace
2016	Lotta things	Raphael Gualazzi	Love Life Peace
2017	La distanza	Giusy Ferreri	Girotondo
2017	Uguale a me	Shady	Shady – EP
