= Old Fashioned Lover Boy =

- Born: Alessandro Panzeri; 28 June 1984 (age 41); Naples, Italy
- Genres: Neo-soul; alternative R&B; alt-folk
- Years active: 2015–present

Alessandro Panzeri (born 28 June 1984), better known by his stage name Old Fashioned Lover Boy, is an Italian singer-songwriter. Since his debut in 2015 he has released two full-length studio albums, Our Life Will Be Made of Simple Things (2016) and Bright (2019), and shared stages with Paolo Nutini, Wild Nothing, Andy Shauf, Scott Matthew, Hurts and Micah P. Hinson.

== Career ==
=== 2015: The Iceberg Theory ===
Living in Naples, he released two albums as a member of the Italian band Abulico. After moving to Milan, he begin recording as a solo artist, influenced by alt-folk artists such as Neil Halstead, Sigur Rós e Justin Vernon. On 3 March 2015 he released his debut EP "The Iceberg Theory" via Sangue Disken/Sherpa Records. The EP was received well by Italian critics, that defined it "a debut to remember". OFLB started his first 50 date live tour across Italy

=== 2016 – 2017: Our Life Will Be Made of Simple Things ===
In April 2016, Old Fashioned Lover Boy released a new single, titled "Oh My Love", produced, arranged and recorded by Marco Giudici (Any Other, Assyrians). The videoclip was inspired by the art of the French painter Fernand Léger. On 11 November 2016 he released the debut LP "Our Life Will Be Made of Simple Things". A few weeks earlier OFLB toured Japan in a minitour presented in the music video for single "Bowling Green". The album reached national and international exposure, received favorable response from Clash, Rockol and Rai Radio 1. Through 2016 and 2017 he racked up over 70 shows in Italy.

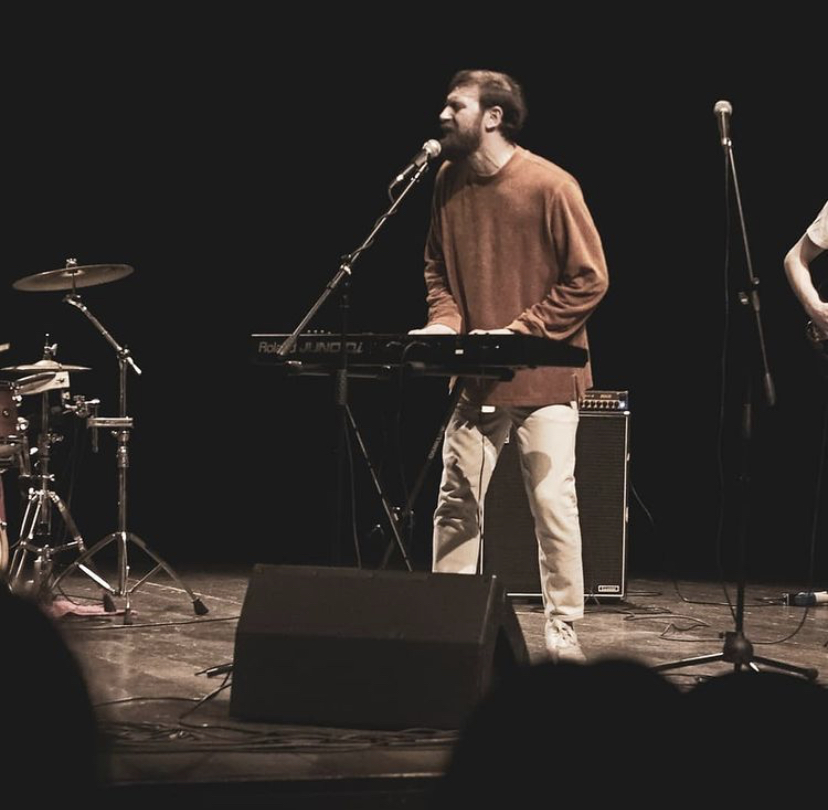
Old Fashioned Lover Boy in 2019

=== 2019: Bright ===
Anticipated by singles I Pray, Modern Life and Goodbye, on 11 November 2016 OFLB released his second album "Bright" via Flagless Records (Canadian release) and A Modest Proposal Records/Peermusic Italy (Italian release) and produced by Marco Giudici. With Bright his music took a shift from alt-folk to the softer sound of the piano with the addition of soul and R&B elements, influenced by artists such as Frank Ocean, Rex Orange County, James Blake, Style Council and Prefab Sprout. The album received positive feedback by Italian press, garnering a "Record of The Year" designation from Rumore and Indie-Roccia. It followed a European tour that saw him perform Italy, Germany, United Kingdom and Sweden.

=== 2020–present ===
In September 2020, Old Fashioned Lover Boy won the call made by SIAE and Italia Music Export, that rewarded the most interesting Italian music projects for export outside the country. On 11 December 2020 he released new single "50", that confirmed his shift to neo-soul and contemporary R&B sounds, influenced by artists such as Arlo Parks and Daniel Caesar.

== Discography ==
=== Studio albums ===
2016 – Our Life Will Be Made of Simple Things

2019 – Bright

=== Eps ===
2015 – The Iceberg Theory

=== Singles ===
2016 – Oh My Love

2016 – Bowling Green

2017 – So Far so CLose

2019 – I Pray

2019 – Modern Life

2019 – Goodbye

2020 – 50
