= Cosa siamo diventati =

Studio album by Diodato
- Released: 27 January 2017
- Label: Carosello
- Producer: Daniele Tortora

Diodato chronology
A ritrovar bellezza (2014)	Cosa siamo diventati (2017)	Che vita meravigliosa (2020)

Singles from Cosa siamo diventati
- 1. "Mi si scioglie la bocca" Released: 30 December 2016; 2. "Di questa felicità" Released: 26 May 2017

Cosa siamo diventati (transl. "What we have become") is the third studio album by the Italian singer-songwriter Diodato. It was released on 27 January 2017 by Carosello Records.

The album peaked at number 48 on the Italian Albums Chart.

== Track listing ==
Cosa siamo diventati track listing
No.	Title	Length
1.	"Uomo fragile"	4:00
2.	"Colpevoli"	3:11
3.	"Paralisi"	4:25
4.	"Fiori immaginari"	4:00
5.	"Guai"	4:00
6.	"Cosa siamo diventati"	3:59
7.	"Mi si scioglie la bocca"	4:29
8.	"La verità"	3:16
9.	"Un po' più facile"	3:02
10.	"Di questa felicità"	3:16
11.	"Per la prima volta"	4:02
12.	"La luce di questa stanza"	4:09

== Charts ==
Weekly chart performance for Cosa siamo diventati
Chart (2017)	Peak position
Italian Albums (FIMI)	48
