= Così speciale =

Studio album by Diodato
- Released: 24 March 2023
- Label: Carosello
- Producer: Tommaso Colliva

Diodato chronology
Che vita meravigliosa (2020)	Così speciale (2023)	Ho acceso un fuoco (2024)

Singles from Così speciale
- 1. "Se mi vuoi" Released: 18 November 2022; 2. "Così speciale" Released: 3 March 2023; 3. "Occhiali da sole" Released: 14 April 2023; 4. "Ci vorrebbe un miracolo" Released: 30 August 2023

Così speciale (transl. "So special") is the fifth studio album by the Italian singer-songwriter Diodato. It was released on 24 March 2023 by Carosello Records.

The album peaked at number 15 on the Italian Albums Chart. It includes the singles "Se mi vuoi", "Così speciale", "Occhiali da sole" and "Ci vorrebbe un miracolo".

== Track listing ==
Così speciale track listing
No.	Title	Length
1.	"Ci vorrebbe un miracolo"	3:23
2.	"Così speciale"	4:15
3.	"Ormai non c'eri che tu"	3:59
4.	"Che casino"	2:44
5.	"Occhiali da sole"	3:57
6.	"Buco nero"	3:17
7.	"Ci dobbiamo incontrare"	3:32
8.	"Se mi vuoi"	3:34
9.	"Lasciati andare"	3:04
10.	"Vieni a ridere di me"	5:02

== Charts ==
Weekly chart performance for Così speciale
Chart (2023)	Peak position
Italian Albums (FIMI)	15
