= Fai rumore =

2020 single by Diodato

Single by Diodato

from the album Che vita meravigliosa
- Released: 7 February 2020
- Recorded: 2020
- Genre: Traditional pop
- Length: 3:36 (original); 3:00 (ESC version)
- Label: Carosello
- Songwriters: Antonio Diodato; Edwyn Roberts

Diodato singles chronology
"Che vita meravigliosa" (2019)	"Fai rumore" (2020)	"Un'altra estate" (2020)

Music video
- "Fai rumore" on YouTube

Eurovision Song Contest 2020 entry
- Country: Italy
- Artist: Diodato
- Language: Italian
- Composers: Antonio Diodato & Edwyn Roberts
- Lyricist: Antonio Diodato

Finals performance
- Final result: Contest cancelled

Entry chronology
- ◄ "Soldi" (2019)
- "Zitti e buoni" (2021) ►

"Fai rumore" (Italian pronunciation: [fai ruˈmoːre]; transl. "[You] Make noise") is a song written and performed by Italian singer Antonio Diodato. It was released as a single on 7 February 2020 and was featured on his album Che vita meravigliosa. The song won the Sanremo Music Festival 2020, and would have represented Italy in the Eurovision Song Contest 2020 in Rotterdam, Netherlands, before the event's cancellation due to the COVID-19 pandemic. It topped the Italian singles chart in its second week of release. This song won Eurovision-Gleði – Okkar 12 stig, an Icelandic alternative show for the Eurovision Song Contest 2020.

== Eurovision Song Contest ==
The song would have represented Italy in the Eurovision Song Contest 2020, after Diodato was selected through Sanremo Music Festival 2020, the music competition that selects Italy's entries for the Eurovision Song Contest. As Italy is a member of the "Big Five", the song automatically advanced to the final, which would have been held on 16 May 2020 in Rotterdam, Netherlands. It was also one amongst the favourites to win the competition if it had not been cancelled. "Fai rumore" was performed again twice, first during Eurovision: Europe Shine a Light in an empty Verona Arena, and during the first semi-final of the Eurovision Song Contest 2022 in Turin as an interval act.

== Music video ==
The music video for "Fai rumore" was directed by Giorgio Testi. As of June 2024, the video has over 91 million views on YouTube.

== Track listing ==
Digital download
No.	Title	Length
1.	"Fai rumore"	3:36

== Charts ==
2020 weekly chart performance for "Fai rumore"
Chart (2020)	Peak position
Croatia International Airplay (Top lista)	66
Italy (FIMI)	1
Italy Airplay (EarOne)	3
Switzerland (Schweizer Hitparade)	36

2022 weekly chart performance for "Fai rumore"
Chart (2022)	Peak position
Lithuania (AGATA)	79

Year-end charts

Chart (2020)	Peak position
Italy (FIMI)	25

== Certifications ==
Region	Certification	Certified units/sales
Italy (FIMI)	3× Platinum	210,000^{‡}
^{‡} Sales+streaming figures based on certification alone.

== Release history ==
Region	Date	Format	Label	Ref.
Italy	5 February 2020	Contemporary hit radio	Carosello Records	
Various	7 February 2020	Digital download, streaming	Carosello Records	
