= Diodato =

Italian singer and songwriter (born 1981)

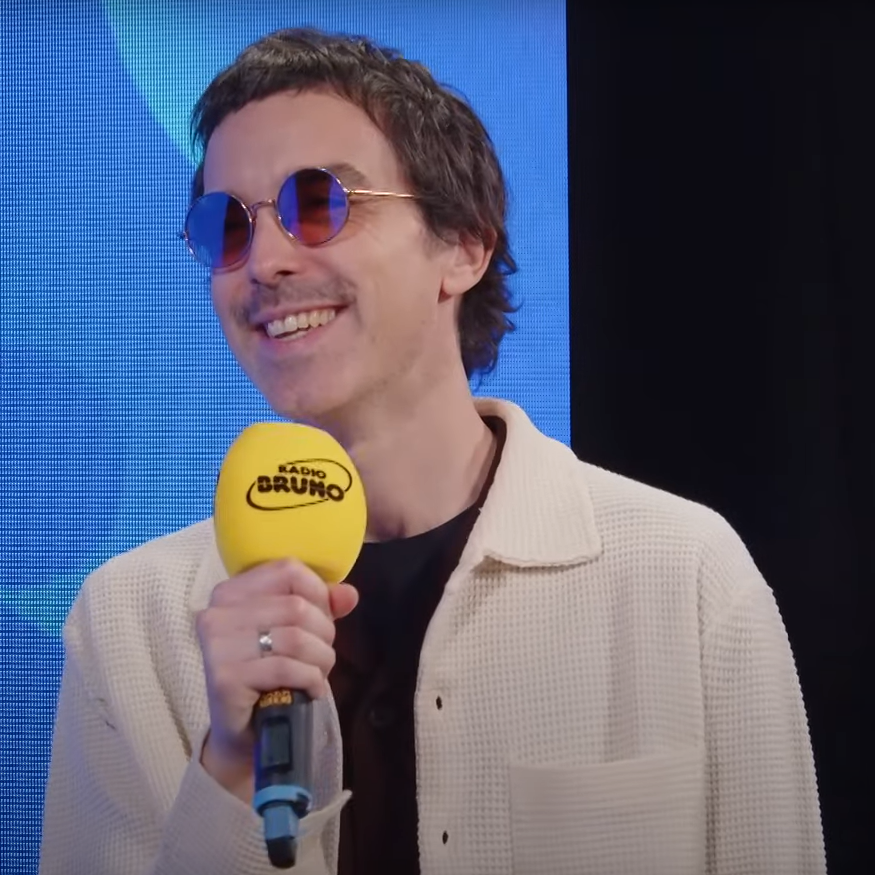
- Diodato in 2024

Background information
- Born: Antonio Diodato; 30 August 1981 (age 44); Aosta, Italy
- Origin: Taranto, Italy
- Genres: Pop rock
- Occupations: Singer; songwriter
- Years active: 2007–present

Antonio Diodato (born 30 August 1981), known simply as Diodato, is an Italian singer-songwriter. He won the 70th edition of the Sanremo Music Festival with the song "Fai rumore" and was scheduled to represent Italy in the Eurovision Song Contest 2020 in Rotterdam before the event's cancellation due to the COVID-19 pandemic.

== Biography ==
Born in Aosta, he grew up in Taranto and later moved to Rome.

His first works were made in Stockholm with Swedish DJs Sebastian Ingrosso and Steve Angello. Back in Italy, he graduated from the DAMS at Roma Tre University in cinema, television and new media.

Among his most important musical influences Diodato mentioned Pink Floyd, Fabrizio De André, Luigi Tenco, Domenico Modugno and Radiohead.

== Career ==
He has released five studio albums, E forse sono pazzo (LeNarcisse/Goodfellas), A ritrovar bellezza (LeNarcisse/RCA/SonyMusic), Cosa siamo diventati, Che vita meravigliosa and Così speciale.

In December 2013, he was selected to participate in the Sanremo Music Festival 2014 (in the "Newcomers" section) with the song "Babilonia". On 19 and 21 February 2014 he performed on the stage of the Teatro Ariston in Sanremo, placing runner-up behind Rocco Hunt. He received the prize of the jury chaired by Paolo Virzì.

In 2014, he won the MTV Italian Music Awards for Best New Generation, The Deezer Band of the Year Award and the Fabrizio De André Award, with his version of "Amore che vieni, amore che vai". In 2016, he became artistic director of the May Day concert in Taranto, together with Roy Paci and Michele Riondino.

In 2017, his third studio album "Cosa siamo diventati" was released by Carosello Records. In 2018, he participated with the song "Adesso", featuring Roy Paci, in the Sanremo Music Festival 2018, placing eighth in the grand final. In 2019, he made his debut as an actor in the film Un'avventura, directed by Marco Danieli.

He won the Sanremo Music Festival 2020 with the song "Fai rumore". The song "Fai rumore" also won the "Mia Martini" Critics Award and the "Lucio Dalla" Press Room Award. On 24 February 2020, the Municipality of Taranto awarded Diodato civic merit. As the winner of the Festival, Diodato was also designated as the Italian representative at the Eurovision Song Contest 2020, however the event was cancelled due to the COVID-19 pandemic. On 16 May 2020, he took part in the event Eurovision: Europe Shine a Light, performing at the Verona Arena with the song "Fai rumore" and with an acoustic version of "Nel blu, dipinto di blu", a song originally recorded by Italian singer-songwriter Domenico Modugno.

On 9 May 2020, he won the David di Donatello for the best original song with "Che vita meravigliosa", used as the soundtrack of the film The Goddess of Fortune, directed by Ferzan Özpetek. On 6 July, the song also won the Nastro d'Argento (Silver Ribbon) for Best Original Song.

He competed in the Sanremo Music Festival 2024 with the song "Ti muovi".

== Discography ==
=== Albums ===
Title	Details	Peak chart positions	Certifications
Title	Details	ITA	Certifications
E forse sono pazzo	Released: 26 April 2013; Format: Digital download; Label: Le Narcisse	—	
A ritrovar bellezza	Released: 29 October 2014; Format: Digital download; Label: Le Narcisse	—	
Cosa siamo diventati	Released: 27 January 2017; Format: Digital download; Label: Carosello Records	48	
Che vita meravigliosa	Released: 14 February 2020; Format: Digital download; Label: Carosello Records	4	FIMI: Platinum
Così speciale	Released: 24 March 2023; Format: Digital download; Label: Carosello Records	15	
Ho acceso un fuoco (Live Studio Session)	Released: 19 April 2024; Format: CD, LP, digital download; Label: Carosello Records	—	

=== Singles ===
Title	Year	Peak chart positions				Certifications	Album
Title	Year	ITA	CRO	LIT	SWI	Certifications	Album
"Amore che vieni amore che vai"	2013	—	—	—	—		E forse sono pazzo
"Ubriaco"	2014	—	—	—	—		E forse sono pazzo
"Babilonia"	2014	69	—	—	—		E forse sono pazzo
"Se solo avessi un altro"	2014	—	—	—	—		E forse sono pazzo
"I miei demoni"	2014	—	—	—	—		E forse sono pazzo
"Eternità"	2014	—	—	—	—		A ritrovar bellezza
"Mi si scioglie la bocca"	2016	—	—	—	—		Cosa siamo diventati
"Di questa felicità"	2017	—	—	—	—		Cosa siamo diventati
"Cretino che sei"	2017	—	—	—	—		Non-album singles
"Adesso" (with Roy Paci)	2018	28	—	—	—		Non-album singles
"Essere semplice"	2018	—	—	—	—		Non-album singles
"Il commerciante"	2019	—	—	—	—		Che vita meravigliosa
"Non ti amo più"	2019	—	—	—	—		Che vita meravigliosa
"Che vita meravigliosa"	2019	51	—	—	—	FIMI: Gold	Che vita meravigliosa
"Fai rumore"	2020	1	66	79	36	FIMI: 3× Platinum	Che vita meravigliosa
"Un'altra estate"	2020	—	—	—	—		Che vita meravigliosa
"Fino a farci scomparire"	2020	—	—	—	—	FIMI: Gold	Che vita meravigliosa
"L'uomo dietro il campione"	2021	—	—	—	—		Non-album single
"Se mi vuoi"	2022	—	—	—	—		Così speciale
"Così speciale"	2023	—	—	—	—		Così speciale
"Occhiali da sole"	2023	—	—	—	—		Così speciale
"Ti muovi"	2024	20	—	—	—	FIMI: Gold	Ho acceso un fuoco
"Molto amore"	2024	—	—	—	—		Non-album singles
"Un atto di rivoluzione"	2024	—	—	—	—		Non-album singles
"—" denotes a title that did not chart, or was not released in that territory.

== Filmography ==
Film
Year	Title	Role	Notes
2019	Un'avventura	Record producer	
2022	Diabolik: Ginko Attacks!	Singer at Armen's	

== Awards and nominations ==
Year	Award	Category	Recipient	Result
2014	MTV Italian Music Awards	Best New Generation	Himself	Won
2020	Sanremo Music Festival 2020	Big Artists	"Fai rumore"	Won
2020	David di Donatello	Best Original Song	"Che vita meravigliosa"	Won
2020	Targa Tenco	Best Album	Che vita meravigliosa	Nominated
2020	Targa Tenco	Best Song	"Che vita meravigliosa"	Nominated
2020	Nastro d'Argento	Best Original Song	"Che vita meravigliosa"	Won
2020	MTV Europe Music Awards	Best Italian Act	Himself	Won

Awards and achievements
Preceded by Mahmood	Sanremo Music Festival winner 2020	Succeeded by Måneskin
Preceded by Mahmood with "Soldi"	Italy in the Eurovision Song Contest; 2020 (cancelled)	Succeeded by Måneskin with "Zitti e buoni"
