= Che vita meravigliosa (song) =

Single by Diodato

from the album Che vita meravigliosa
- Released: 29 November 2019
- Length: 3:32
- Label: Carosello
- Songwriter(s): Diodato
- Producer(s): Tommaso Colliva

Diodato singles chronology
"Non ti amo più" (2019)	"Che vita meravigliosa" (2019)	"Fai rumore" (2020)

Music video
- "Che vita meravigliosa" on YouTube

"Che vita meravigliosa" (transl. "What a wonderful life") is a song by Italian singer-songwriter Diodato. It was released as a digital download and for streaming on 29 November 2019 by Carosello Records.

The song was part of the original soundtrack of the film The Goddess of Fortune by Ferzan Özpetek. It was awarded with both the David di Donatello and the Nastro d'Argento for Best Original Song.

== Music video ==
A music video to accompany the release of "Che vita meravigliosa" was first released onto YouTube on 6 January 2020. The video was directed by Daniele Pini and shot in Tokyo.

== Charts ==
Chart performance for "Che vita meravigliosa"
Chart (2020)	Peak position
Italy (FIMI)	51
Italy Airplay (EarOne)	24

== Certifications ==
Certifications for "Che vita meravigliosa"
Region	Certification	Certified units/sales
Italy (FIMI)	Gold	35,000^{‡}
^{‡} Sales+streaming figures based on certification alone.

== Accolades ==
Awards and nominations for "Che vita meravigliosa"
Year	Ceremony	Award	Result	Ref.
2020	David di Donatello	Best Original Song	Won	
2020	Nastro d'Argento	Best Original Song	Won	
2020	Ciak Awards	Best Original Song	Won	
