= Che vita meravigliosa =

Studio album by Diodato
- Released: 14 February 2020
- Length: 43:56
- Label: Carosello

Diodato chronology
Cosa siamo diventati (2017)	Che vita meravigliosa (2020)	Così speciale (2023)

Singles from Che vita meravigliosa
- 1. "Il commerciante" Released: 16 April 2019; 2. "Non ti amo più" Released: 28 June 2019; 3. "Che vita meravigliosa" Released: 29 November 2019; 4. "Fai rumore" Released: 7 February 2020

Che vita meravigliosa (transl. "What a Wonderful Life") is the fourth studio album by the Italian singer-songwriter Diodato. It was released on 14 February 2020 by Carosello Records. The album peaked at number four on the Italian Albums Chart. The album includes the singles "Il commerciante", "Non ti amo più", "Che vita meravigliosa" and "Fai rumore".

== Singles ==
"Il commerciante" was released as the lead single from the album on 16 April 2019. "Non ti amo più" was released as the second single from the album on 28 June 2019. "Che vita meravigliosa" was released as the third single from the album on 29 November 2019; it peaked at number 51 on the Italian Singles Chart. "Fai rumore" was released as the fourth single from the album on 7 February 2020. The song, which peaked at number one on the Italian Singles Chart, won Sanremo Music Festival 2020 and would have represented Italy in the Eurovision Song Contest 2020 in Rotterdam, the Netherlands, before the show's cancellation due to the COVID-19 pandemic.

== Track listing ==
Che vita meravigliosa track listing
No.	Title	Writer(s)	Length
1.	"Che vita meravigliosa"		3:32
2.	"Fino a farci scomparire"		3:44
3.	"La lascio a voi questa domenica"		3:59
4.	"Fai rumore"	Antonio Diodato; Edwyn Roberts	3:36
5.	"Alveari"		4:03
6.	"Ciao, ci vediamo"		3:25
7.	"Non ti amo più"		3:21
8.	"Solo"		4:09
9.	"Il commerciante"		3:14
10.	"E allora faccio così"		3:32
11.	"Quello che mi manca di te"		4:05
Total length:			43:56

== Charts ==
=== Weekly charts ===
Weekly chart performance for Che vita meravigliosa
Chart (2020)	Peak position
Italian Albums (FIMI)	4

=== Year-end charts ===
Year-end chart performance for Che vita meravigliosa
Chart (2020)	Position
Italian Albums (FIMI)	46

== Release history ==
Release formats for Che vita meravigliosa
Region	Date	Format	Label
Italy	14 February 2020	Digital download; streaming	Carosello Records

== See also ==
- List of 2020 albums
