= Adesso (song) =

Single by Diodato featuring Roy Paci
- Released: 6 February 2018
- Length: 3:20
- Label: Carosello
- Songwriter(s): Diodato
- Producer(s): Antonio Filippelli

Diodato singles chronology
"Cretino che sei" (2017)	"Adesso" (2018)	"Essere semplice" (2018)

Roy Paci singles chronology
"Terra madre" (2014)	"Adesso" (2018)	"Nena" (2019)

Music video
- "Adesso" on YouTube

"Adesso" (transl. "Now") is a song by Italian singer-songwriter Diodato, featuring Italian trumpeter Roy Paci. It was released on 6 February 2018 by Carosello Records.

The song was Diodato and Roy Paci's entry for the Sanremo Music Festival 2018, where it placed eighth in the grand final.

== Music video ==
A music video to accompany the release of "Adesso" was first released onto YouTube on 7 February 2018. The video was directed by Riccardo Petrillo and Giulio Scarano, starring Italian actors Sara Mondello and Saverio Cappiello.

== Charts ==
Chart performance for "Adesso"
Chart (2018)	Peak position
Italy (FIMI)	28
Italy Airplay (EarOne)	22
