= Mau Mau (band) =

Italian band

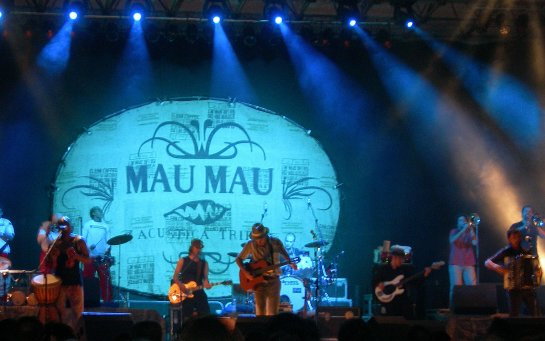
- Mau Mau live at Mazdapalace, Milan on June 29, 2006

Background information
- Origin: Piedmont, Italy
- Genres: Folk, world music
- Years active: 1991–present
- Label: EMI
- Members: Luca Morino; Fabio Barovero; Tatè Nsongan
- Website: maumau.it

Mau Mau is an Italian band from Turin, formed in 1990 by Luca Morino (vocals and guitar), Fabio Barovero (accordion) and Tatè Nsongan (Djembe). With roots in the underground cult group Loschi Dezi, the band draws its influences from world music, especially Mediterranean, African, Arabic and Latin traditions. They mainly sing in native Piedmontese. The band's name has a double meaning: it references the Kenyan Mau Mau uprising against British colonial rule, and in Piedmontese, Mau Mau designates "people who come from afar".

== Biography ==
The band released their first EP, Soma la macia (We are the scrub) in 1992. Sung in Piedmontese, the EP attracted the attention of Peter Gabriel, who invited them to record their first proper album at his Real World Studios. The result was Sauta Rabel (Let's Jump, Let's Make Such a Row), which won the Club Tenco (IT) Award for best debut album. It was followed by an International tour that included appearances at the Palestine International Dance & Music Festival and the International Festival of Babylon in Iraq.

In 1994, Mau Mau returned to Real World Studios in Wiltshire to record their second album, Bàss paradis (Low Paradise). The lead single from the album, "La Ola", received significant radio airplay. The album was dedicated to people who suffered under colonialism, and was released on the European market, as well as in Japan, and was followed by a 100-dates tour.

Mau Mau's third album, Viva Mamanera, was released in 1996. It was recorded with Eric Sarafin in Los Angeles, Paris (including a few field recordings in the Paris Metro) and Turin. The album includes more electronic sounds than earlier releases, and was successful in Italy and in France. In the summer of 1996 the band performed in front of over seventy thousand people when they opened for Paolo Conte at the Paleo Festival in Nyon.

Subsequently, the principle band members travelled to Morocco to study Arab culture and to work with artists of different backgrounds. The result of this experience was Eldorado, the band's 1998 album. It includes a collaboration with the "Meninos do Pelo" (the street urchins of Salvador de Bahia). The promotional tour began at the "Feira das Mentiras", Manu Chao's festival in Santiago de Compostela, (Galicia). After the tour, the band organized the "PiemontAfrique Festival" in Turin to promote African cultures.

In 2000, EMI released Safari Beach, the fifth album of the band, made in collaboration with Sargento Garcia. The album was less successful than earlier releases. Marasma General, Mau Mau's first live album, followed in 2001. It includes a duet with Inti-Illimani on the song "Eldorado". The band went on a temporary hiatus afterwards.

During the break, Luca Morino wrote for the newspaper La Stampa and released a solo album called Mistic Turistic/Moleskine Ballads. Fabio Barovero founded the folk band Banda Ionica and wrote soundtracks for movies, including Davide Ferrario's Dopo Mezzanotte (After Midnight) and Alessandro d'Alatri's La Febbre. Tatè Nsongan co-founded the band Kin Konba and worked on audio books, providing tehmusic to the Italian edition of Francis Bebey's La falsa nota di Nyambé.

Mau Mau returned in 2006 with the album Dea, which combined Brazilian and Piedmontese traditional music and includes a collaboration with Sud Sound System. The album's promotional tour included a performance at the inauguration day for "Turin Rome—World Book Capital", organized by Subsonica, where the band played a version of its song "Campeador de Vigna" that weaves together the thread of the Miguel de Cervantes' Don Quixote. The band also organized the inauguration day of "Terra Madre" in Turin.

== Members ==
- Luca Morino – voice, guitar
- Fabio Barovero – accordion, keyboard
- Bienvenu Tatè Nsongan – percussion, voice

=== Other members ===
- Josh Sanfelici – bass guitar
- Paolo Gep Cucco – drums
- Amik Guerra – trumpet

== Discography ==
=== Studio albums ===
- 1992 Sauta rabel
- 1994 Bass paradis
- 1996 Viva Mamanera
- 1998 Eldorado
- 2000 Safari Beach
- 2006 Dea
- 2016 8000 Km

=== EPs ===
- 1992 Soma la macia
- 1993 Tùira

=== Singles ===
- 1994 "Adorè"
- 1996 "La Ola"
- 1998 "Eldorado"
- 1998 "Per Amor"
- 2000 "Due Cuori"
- 2006 "Dea"
- 2006 "Qualcuno verrà da te"
- 2011 "Mare Nostrum"
