= Ho un piano =

Studio album by Raphael Gualazzi
- Released: 7 February 2020
- Label: Sugar Music

Raphael Gualazzi chronology
Love Life Peace (2016)	Ho un piano (2020)

Singles from Ho un piano
- 1. "Carioca" Released: 5 February 2020

Ho un piano is the fifth studio album by Italian singer and pianist Raphael Gualazzi. It was released in Italy on 7 February 2020 through Sugar Music. The album peaked at number 34 on the Italian Albums Chart. The album includes the single "Carioca", which was Gualazzi's entry into the 70th edition of Italy's national Eurovision song selection competition, the Sanremo Music Festival 2020.

== Singles ==
"Carioca" was released as the lead single from the album on 5 February 2020. The song peaked at number 33 on the Italian Singles Chart. The song took part in Sanremo Music Festival 2020, the 70th edition of Italy's national Eurovision song selection competition, where it placed 11th in the grand final.

== Track listing ==
No.	Title	Length
1.	"Nah nah"	3:09
2.	"Immobile aurora"	3:50
3.	"Carioca"	3:27
4.	"Italià"	4:15
5.	"Questa volta no"	3:29
6.	"La libertà"	3:30
7.	"La parodie"	2:46
8.	"Vai via"	4:40
9.	"Broken Bones"	3:41
10.	"Per noi"	3:01
11.	"E se domani" (with Simona Molinari)	4:04

== Charts ==
Chart (2020)	Peak position
Italian Albums (FIMI)	34

== Release history ==
Region	Date	Format	Label
Italy	7 February 2020	Digital download	Sugar Music
