= Roy Paci =

Italian composer (born 1969)

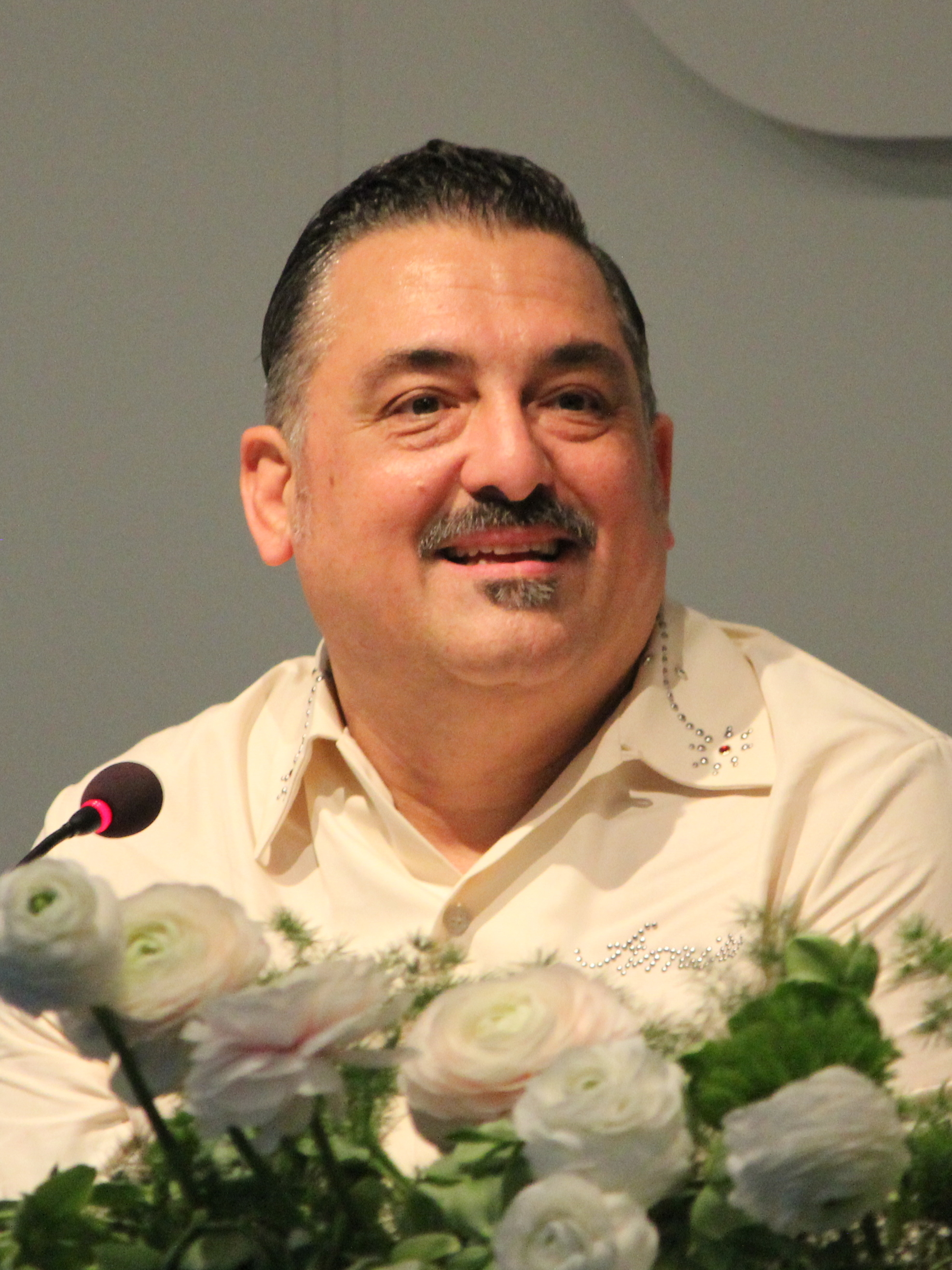
- Paci at 2026 Sanremo Music Festival

Background information
- Born: 16 September 1969 (age 56); Augusta, Italy
- Occupations: Composer; arranger; producer
- Instruments: Trumpet; voice
- Years active: 1982–present

Rosario "Roy" Paci (born 16 September 1969) is an Italian composer, singer, and trumpet player.

== Music and career ==
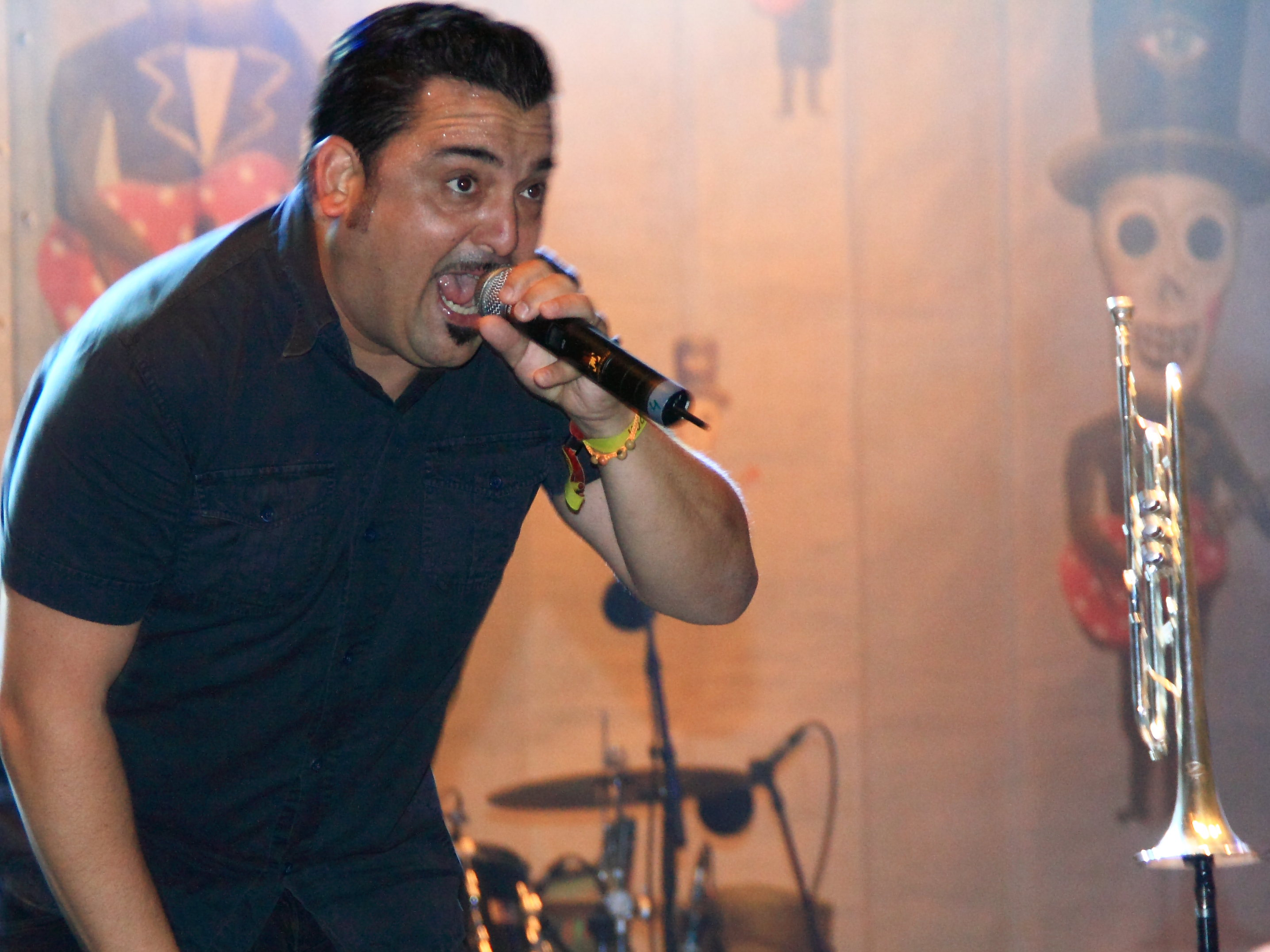
Paci in 2011

Born in Augusta, Sicily, Paci started playing the piano as a young child and picked up the trumpet at age 10. By age 13, he was playing traditional Sicilian jazz and performing in some of Italy's most famous clubs.

Paci moved to South America in 1990 where he traveled to play cumbia and popular music in Uruguay, Argentina and Brazil. Further trips to the Canary Islands and Senegal helped him to train and develop his musical influences. These travels set Paci on the path that would lead him into a series of collaborations and tours involving music projects, film, television and political causes, including relief efforts in Africa and Amnesty International's campaign against violence on women.

Returning to Italy, Paci entered the alternative rock scene to play with several bands, including Persiana Jones, Qbeta, Mau Mau, Banda Ionica, and ZU. Paci's tastes reflected his broad influences and these bands played musical styles ranging from ska and punk to free jazz and Italian funeral marches.

In 1999, Roy Paci met French-Spanish musician Manu Chao with whom he recorded the critically acclaimed album Próxima Estación: Esperanza. Paci continued to record with Chao and toured extensively with his group Radio Bemba Sound System. In 2001 Paci began a long-standing collaboration with Dutch post-punk band The Ex, touring and recording with their Ex Orkest, a 20-piece band made up of various European improvisors revolving around The Ex's scratchy anarcho-punk anthems. Along with Wolter Wierbos (trombone), Mats Gustafsson and Ken Vandermark (saxophones), Paci has continued to tour with The Ex as a member of Brass Unbound and contributed trumpet tracks for the band's album Catch My Shoe.

In 2002, Paci formed his own band Aretuska and founded the record label Etnagigante in 2003 to produce their second album Tuttapposto, which explored calypso, rocksteady and swing rhythms alongside new arrangements of classic Sicilian folk music. Collaborations continued with Tony Scott, Mike Patton, Gogol Bordello, Shantel and Zap Mama.

In 2006, Paci joined forces with Grammy Award-winning klezmer musician Frank London and Balkan brass band leader Boban Markovic for an album combining Paci's Sicilian tradition with Jewish melodies and Balkan sounds called Trumpet Triumph.

In 2018, Paci entered the Sanremo Music Festival in collaboration with Diodato, entering the song "Adesso" and finishing 8th overall.

In 2023, Paci entered Sanmarinese national selection Una voce per San Marino with the song "Tromba".

== Theatre, television and cinema ==
Roy Paci has worked for the Italian alternative theater scene, putting up the show Poetry and Andalusia, which was performed in Italy's the most prominent avant-garde theaters. Paci's penchant for experimental theater and music mingled in the Trade Almost telepathy, written by Ivano Fossati and subsequently released as audiobooks. Starting in 2005, Roy Paci's group Aretuska served as the house band on popular Italian television shows, making him and his music familiar to the general public. Paci has composed film scores for Italian cinema and several of Paci's songs have been commissioned for film soundtracks, including a version of "Besame Mucho" in Leonardo Pieraccioni's 2003 film Suddenly Paradise.

== Discography ==
=== Albums by Roy Paci and Aretuska ===
- Baciamo Le Mani (2001)
- Tuttapposto (2003)
- Parola D'Onore (2005)
- Suonoglobal (2007)
- Bestiario Siciliano – Greatest Hits of Roy Paci & Aretuska (2008)
- Latinista (2010)
- Valelapena (2017)

=== Singles ===
- "Cantu Siciliano" (2002)
- "The Duse" (2002)
- "Bésame Mucho" (2003)
- "Yettaboom" (2003)
- "Viva la vida" (2006)
- "What you see is what you get" (2006)
- "Toda Joia toda beleza" (feat. Manu Chao)
- "Giramundo" (2007)
- "Bonjour Bahia" (2010)

=== Collaborations ===
==== With The Ex ====
- Een Rondje Holland (2001)
- Catch My Shoe (2010)
- Enormous Door (2013)

==== With Manu Chao ====
- Próxima Estación: Esperanza (Virgin, 2001)
- Radio Bemba Sound System (live, Virgin, 2002)
- Sibérie m'était contée (Virgin, 2004)
- La Radiolina (Because/Nacional, 2007)

==== With Matshie ====
- Flight Song #7
- I Am Sad

==== With Mau Mau ====
- Viva Mamanera
- Eldorado
- General chaos
- Safari Beach

==== With Negrita ====
- Soy Taranta
- Infinite Joy
- Move!
- Notte Mediterranea
- Brother Joe
- Giramundo

==== With other musicians ====
- Quattroemezzo – Brusco
- Closet Wonder – Cesare Basile
- Conjure – Conjure
- Same Wave – Dj Jad
- Electro Cabaret – The Fire
- Malacabeza – Harpoons
- No Doubt – Jaka
- Mondo Cane – Mike Patton & Metropole Orchestra
- Tacabanda – Pelù
- Unidentified – Subsonica
- Hard World – Tonino Carotone
- Esplosivo (KOB) – Cor Veleno
- Mezzogiorno di Fuoco – Caparezza & Sud Sound System
- 24000 – Dubioza Kolektiv (Happy Machine, 2016)
- "Adesso" - Diodato
- Askund – Shkodra Elektronike
