= Rumore (magazine) =

Italian music magazine

- March 2021 issue, featuring Franco Battiato
- Categories: Music magazine
- Frequency: Monthly
- Publisher: Homework Edizioni
- Founder: Claudio Sorge, Max Stefani
- Founded: 1992
- Country: Italy
- Based in: Turin
- Language: Italian

Rumore (lit. 'Noise') is an Italian monthly music magazine founded in 1992. It has been described as 'one among the most influential voices of alternative music in Italy'.

== History and profile ==
The magazine was founded in Turin in 1992. Founders were Claudio Sorge and Max Stefani, who left the project almost immediately, and the editorial staff mostly consisted of former Rockerilla's journalists. Their objective was 'to create a magazine with a modern slant, using a language that was less "fanzine-style" and more professional'.

The magazine covers various genres including rock, punk, crossover, hip hop and electric music, giving equal attention to both underground and mainstream scenes. It also covers cinema, literature, comics and television. In 2013, Sorge left the direction, being replaced by Perturbazione drummer and founding member Rossano Lo Mele as editorial director.

== See also ==
- List of magazines in Italy
