= Happy Mistake =

Studio album by Raphael Gualazzi
- Released: 14 February 2013
- Recorded: 2012
- Genre: Jazz
- Label: Sugar Music

Raphael Gualazzi chronology
Reality and Fantasy (2011)	Happy Mistake (2013)	Accidentally on Purpose - Sanremo's Festival 2014 (2014)

Singles from Happy Mistake
- 1. "Sai (ci basta un sogno)" Released: 13 February 2013; 2. "Senza ritegno" Released: 13 February 2013

Happy Mistake is the third studio album by Italian singer and pianist Raphael Gualazzi. It was released in Italy through Sugar Music on the 14 February 2013. The album reached number 5 on the Italian Albums Chart. The album also charted in Belgium and France. An International Deluxe Edition was released on 25 March 2013.

== Singles ==
"Sai (ci basta un sogno)" was released as the lead single from the album on 13 February 2013. The song peaked to number 15 on the Italian Singles Chart. "Senza ritegno" was released as the second single from the album on 13 February 2013.

== Track listing ==
=== Standard listing ===
No.	Title	Length
1.	"Don't Call My Name"	3:49
2.	"L'amie d'un italien (Rainbows)" (feat. Camille)	3:12
3.	"Sai (ci basta un sogno)"	4:05
4.	"Senza ritegno"	3:39
5.	"Baby What's Wrong"	3:39
6.	"Seventy Days of Love"	4:18
7.	"Un mare in luce"	3:30
8.	"Improvvisazione su temi di Amarcord"	4:43
9.	"Beautiful"	5:06
10.	"Mambo Soul"	3:26
11.	"I'm Tired"	3:22
12.	"Questa o quella per me pari non sono"	5:01
13.	"Welcome to My Hell" (feat. The Puppini Sisters)	3:28

== Charts ==
=== Weekly charts ===
Chart (2013)	Peak position
Belgian Albums (Ultratop Wallonia)	173
French Albums (SNEP)	87
Italian Albums (FIMI)	5

== Release history ==
Region	Date	Format	Label
Italy	14 February 2013	Digital download	Sugar Music
