= Banda Ionica =

- Origin: Sicily, Italy
- Genres: Folk, world music
- Years active: 1997–present
- Labels: EMI
- Members: Roy Paci; Fabio Barovero
- Website: bandaionica.it (archived, currently broken as of 2025-01-17) Banda Ionica on Bandcamp

Banda Ionica is an Italian folk group focused on the brass band traditions of Sicily. The roots of the music played by the band can be traced to Holy Week and funeral marches. The banda tradition, updated by Banda Ionica and others, helped to bring the operatic and classical music to the rural poor.

Founded in 1997 by Fabio Barovero (formerly of the group Mau Mau) and Roy Paci, the group is currently composed of twenty young musicians and plays a mix of traditional and original compositions.

== Discography ==
=== Albums ===
- Passione (1997)
- Matri Mia (2002)

=== Soundtracks ===
- Dopo mezzanotte, directed by Davide Ferrario (2004)
- La febbre, directed by Alessandro d'Alatri (2005)
