= L'estate di John Wayne =

Single by Raphael Gualazzi

from the album Love Life Peace
- Released: 15 July 2016
- Recorded: 2015
- Genre: Pop rock
- Length: 3:29
- Label: Sugar Music
- Songwriters: Matteo Buzzanca: Raphael Gualazzi; Alessandro Raina; Lorenzo Urciullo

Raphael Gualazzi singles chronology
"Tanto ci sei" (2014)	"L'estate di John Wayne" (2016)	"Lotta Things" (2016)

"L'estate di John Wayne" is a song performed by Italian singer and pianist Raphael Gualazzi. The song was released in Italy as a digital download on 15 July 2016 as the lead single from his fourth studio album Love Life Peace (2016). The song peaked at number 43 on the Italian Singles Chart, and was later certified platinum by the Federation of the Italian Music Industry.

== Music video ==
A music video to accompany the release of "L'estate di John Wayne" was first released onto YouTube on 14 July 2016 at a total length of three minutes and twenty-six seconds. The video was directed by Jacopo Rondinelli.

== Track listing ==
Digital download
No.	Title	Length
1.	"L'estate di John Wayne"	3:29

== Charts ==
=== Weekly charts ===
Chart (2016)	Peak position
Italy (FIMI)	43
Italy Airplay (EarOne)	3

== Release history ==
Region	Date	Format	Label
Italy	15 July 2016	Digital download	Sugar Music

== Certifications ==
Certifications for "L'estate di John Wayne"
Region	Certification	Certified units/sales
Italy (FIMI)	Platinum	50,000^{‡}
^{‡} Sales+streaming figures based on certification alone.
