= Carioca (Raphael Gualazzi song) =

Single by Raphael Gualazzi

from the album Ho un piano
- Released: 5 February 2020
- Genre: Nu jazz; Latin jazz; dance-pop
- Length: 3:27
- Label: Sugar Music
- Songwriters: Raphael Gualazzi; Davide Pavanello; Davide Petrella

Raphael Gualazzi singles chronology
"La fine del mondo" (2017)	"Carioca" (2020)

"Carioca" is a song by Italian singer and pianist Raphael Gualazzi. The song was released as a digital download and for streaming on 5 February 2020 by Sugar Music as the lead single from his fifth studio album Ho un piano. The song peaked at number thirty-three on the Italian Singles Chart. The song was Gualazzi's entry for the Sanremo Music Festival 2020, the 70th edition of Italy's musical festival which doubles also as a selection of the act for Eurovision Song Contest, where it placed 11th in the grand final. The song was written by Raphael Gualazzi, Davide Pavanello and Davide Petrella.

== Music video ==
A music video for "Carioca" was released on YouTube on 5 February 2020.

== Track listing ==
Digital download and stream
No.	Title	Length
1.	"Carioca"	3:27

Digital download and stream
No.	Title	Length
1.	"Carioca" (Gil Sanders Remix)	3:06

== Charts ==
Chart (2020)	Peak position
Italy (FIMI)	33
Italy Airplay (EarOne)	32

== Release history ==
Region	Date	Format	Label
Italy	5 February 2020	Digital download; streaming	Sugar Music
