= Babilonia (song) =

Single by Diodato

from the album E forse sono pazzo
- Released: 12 February 2014
- Length: 3:25
- Label: La Narcisse
- Songwriter(s): Diodato
- Producer(s): Daniele Tortora

Diodato singles chronology
"Ubriaco" (2014)	"Babilonia" (2014)	"Se solo avessi un altro" (2014)

Music video
- "Babilonia" on YouTube

"Babilonia" (transl. "Babylonia") is a song by Italian singer-songwriter Diodato. It was released on 12 February 2014 by La Narcisse and included in the digital re-issue of his debut studio album E forse sono pazzo.

The song was Diodato's entry for the "Newcomers" section of the Sanremo Music Festival 2014, where it placed second behind Rocco Hunt's "Nu juorno buono".

== Music video ==
A music video to accompany the release of "Babilonia", directed by Fabio Tarantino, was first released onto YouTube on 3 February 2014.

== Charts ==
Chart performance for "Babilonia"
Chart (2014)	Peak position
Italy (FIMI)	69
