= Love Life Peace =

Studio album by Raphael Gualazzi
- Released: 23 September 2016
- Recorded: 2015
- Genre: Jazz
- Label: Sugar Music

Raphael Gualazzi chronology
Accidentally on Purpose - Sanremo's Festival 2014 (2014)	Love Life Peace (2016)	Ho un piano (2020)

Singles from Love Life Peace
- 1. "L'estate di John Wayne" Released: 15 July 2016; 2. "Lotta Things" Released: 30 October 2016; 3. "Buena fortuna" Released: 24 February 2017

Love Life Peace is the fourth studio album by Italian singer and pianist Raphael Gualazzi. It was released in Italy through Sugar Music on the 23 September 2016. The album reached number 4 on the Italian Albums Chart. The album includes the singles "L'estate di John Wayne" and "Lotta Things".

== Singles ==
"L'estate di John Wayne" was released as the lead single from the album on 15 July 2016. The song peaked at number 43 on the Italian Singles Chart. "Lotta Things" was released as the second single from the album on 30 October 2016. "Buena fortuna" was released as the third single from the album on 24 February 2017.

== Track listing ==
=== Standard listing ===
No.	Title	Length
1.	"All Alone"	4:00
2.	"L'estate di John Wayne"	3:29
3.	"Mondello Beach"	3:07
4.	"Say I Do"	3:30
5.	"Buena fortuna" (feat. Malika Ayane)	3:10
6.	"Lotta Things"	3:24
7.	"Quel che sai di me"	4:34
8.	"Right to the Dawn"	4:06
9.	"Splende il mattino"	3:14
10.	"Figli del vento"	3:10
11.	"Disco Ball"	3:05
12.	"Love Life Peace"	3:36
13.	"Pinzipo" (Bonus track)	3:18

== Charts and certifications ==
=== Weekly charts ===
Chart (2016)	Peak position
Italian Albums (FIMI)	4

=== Certifications ===
Region	Certification	Certified units/sales
Italy (FIMI)	Gold	25,000^{*}
^{*} Sales figures based on certification alone.

== Release history ==
Region	Date	Format	Label
Italy	23 September 2016	Digital download	Sugar Music
