= Liberi o no =

Single by Raphael Gualazzi & The Bloody Beetroots

from the album Accidentally on Purpose - Sanremo's Festival 2014
- Released: 20 February 2014
- Recorded: 2013
- Length: 3:37
- Label: Sugar Music
- Songwriters: Sir Bob Cornelius Rifo; Raphael Gualazzi
- Producers: Sir Bob Cornelius Rifo; Raphael Gualazzi

Raphael Gualazzi singles chronology
"Senza ritegno" (2013)	"Liberi o no" (2014)	"Tanto ci sei" (2014)

"Liberi o no" (Italian: [ˈliːberi o (n)ˈnɔ, -rj -]; 'Free or not') is a song performed by Italian singer and pianist Raphael Gualazzi and The Bloody Beetroots. The song was released in Italy as a digital download on 20 February 2014 as the lead single from his second extended play Accidentally on Purpose - Sanremo's Festival 2014. The song peaked at number 20 on the Italian Singles Chart. The song was written and produced by Sir Bob Cornelius Rifo and Raphael Gualazzi.

== Music video ==
A music video to accompany the release of "Liberi o no" was first released onto YouTube on 18 February 2014 at a total length of three minutes and thirty-three seconds.

== Track listing ==
Digital download
No.	Title	Length
1.	"Liberi o no"	3:37

== Charts ==
=== Weekly charts ===
Chart (2014)	Peak position
Italy (FIMI)	20
Italy Airplay (EarOne)	11

== Release history ==
Region	Date	Format	Label
Italy	20 February 2014	Digital download	Sugar Music
