= Love Outside the Window =

Studio album by Raphael Gualazzi
- Released: 23 September 2005
- Recorded: 2004–2005
- Genre: Jazz
- Label: Edel Music

Raphael Gualazzi chronology
Love Outside the Window (2005)	Raphael Gualazzi (2010)

Love Outside the Window is the debut studio album by Italian singer and pianist Raphael Gualazzi. It was released in Italy through Edel Music on the 23 September 2005. The album reached number 44 on the Italian Albums Chart.

== Track listing ==
No.	Title	Length
1.	"A Simple Song"	2:08
2.	"A Song for Your Soul"	2:40
3.	"Besame Mucho"	3:27
4.	"A Devil Crying"	2:44
5.	"Escape"	3:05
6.	"A French Cartoon"	3:12
7.	"Georgia on My Mind"	1:56
8.	"Jameson's Lament"	2:04
9.	"Peace"	1:45
10.	"Summertime" (From "Porgy & Bess")	4:17
11.	"Crazy Rag Blues"	3:07
12.	"Crying Laughing"	2:41
13.	"Love Outside the Window"	2:01
14.	"Sweet Fucking Blues"	1:39

== Charts ==
=== Weekly charts ===
Chart (2005)	Peak position
Italian Albums (FIMI)	44

== Release history ==
Region	Date	Format	Label
Italy	23 September 2005	Digital download	Edel Music
