= Follia d'amore =

2011 song by Raphael Gualazzi

Single by Raphael Gualazzi

from the album Reality and Fantasy
- Released: 16 February 2011
- Recorded: 2010
- Genre: Pop; Jazz
- Length: 3:35
- Label: Sugar Music
- Songwriter: Raphael Gualazzi
- Producers: Raphael Gualazzi; Ferdinando Arnò

Raphael Gualazzi singles chronology
"Reality and Fantasy" (2010)	"Follia d'amore" (2011)	"A Three Second Breath" (2011)

Alternative cover
- International version

Music video
- "Madness of Love" on YouTube

Eurovision Song Contest 2011 entry
- Country: Italy
- Artist: Raphael Gualazzi
- Languages: Italian, English
- Composer: Raphael Gualazzi
- Lyricist: Raphael Gualazzi

Finals performance
- Final result: 2nd
- Final points: 189

Entry chronology
- ◄ "Fiumi di parole" (1997)
- "L'amore è femmina" (2012) ►

"Follia d'amore" is a song by Raphael Gualazzi. It was the winner of the Sanremo Music Festival 2011 in the newcomer artists' section and also won the Critics' "Mia Martini" Award for newcomers.

On 19 February 2011, Gualazzi was chosen by a specific jury among the participants at the Sanremo Festival to be the Italian entry for the Eurovision Song Contest 2011 in Düsseldorf, Germany. The song, performed in a bilingual English-Italian version retitled "Madness of Love", won second place in the contest, surpassing most expectations. It was the first Italian entry at the Eurovision Song Contest in 14 years, having last entered in 1997.

The song is included in the soundtrack of the movie Manuale d'amore 3, directed by Giovanni Veronesi. It also received a nomination for the Nastro d'Argento 2011 for Best Original Song.

== Background ==
Written by Raphael Gualazzi and produced by Gualazzi himself with Ferdinando Arnò, "Follia d'amore" is a stride piano song with swing, R&B and blues influences, characterized by a retro style inspired by the American popular music of the 1920s. Gualazzi described the song as the "perfect synthesis of the musical world that inspired me, from Art Tatum to Duke Ellington and Oscar Peterson, the stride piano, an evolution of ragtime, a genre with which I got in touch when I was twenty, and I immediately loved it. I later tried to mix this genre with my classical music education and with the Italian vocal style".

Talking about the lyrical content of the song, Gualazzi explained that it is based on the two most important ingredients to enjoy life, madness and love.

== Sanremo Music Festival ==
Gualazzi performed the song for the first time on 16 February 2011, during the second night of the 61st Sanremo Music Festival. After qualifying for the final, Gualazzi sang his entry again on 18 February 2011, and on the same night he was declared the winner of the newcomers' section. The following night, Gualazzi received the Mia Martini Critic's prize, receiving 67 points out of 108, and he was officially chosen as the act representing Italy at the Eurovision Song Contest 2011. The song also received the Press, Radio & TV Award.

During Gualazzi's performances, the Sanremo Festival Orchestra was conducted by Ferdinando Arnò, co-producer of the song.

== Music videos ==
The Italian version of the videoclip was directed by Valentina Be. For the English-language version of the song, another videoclip was filmed, directed by Duccio Forzano.

== Eurovision Song Contest ==
During the Eurovision Song Contest, Gualazzi performed a half-English version of the song, titled "Madness of Love". His performance marked Italy's comeback in the competition, after a 13-year-long absence: the last Italian entry at the Eurovision Song Contest had been "Fiumi di parole" by Jalisse in 1997.

Since Italy was included in the "Big Five", Gualazzi automatically qualified for the Eurovision final, held on 14 May 2011. His performance was the twelfth of the night. Receiving 189 points, Gualazzi came in second place, behind Ell & Nikki's "Running Scared", representing Azerbaijan.

== Track listing ==
Digital download (Italy)
No.	Title	Writer(s)	Producer(s)	Length
1.	"Follia d'amore"	Raphael Gualazzi	Gualazzi; Ferdinando Arnò	3:32

Digital download (Europe)
No.	Title	Writer(s)	Producer(s)	Length
1.	"Madness of Love"	Raphael Gualazzi	Gualazzi; Ferdinando Arnò	3:32

== Charts and certifications ==
=== Peak positions ===
Chart (2011)	Peak position
Austria (Ö3 Austria Top 40)	40
Belgium (Ultratip Bubbling Under Flanders)	33
Belgium (Ultratip Bubbling Under Wallonia)	35
Iceland (RÚV)	22
Italy (FIMI)	8
Netherlands (Single Top 100)	90
Switzerland (Schweizer Hitparade)	52

=== Certifications ===
Region	Certification	Certified units/sales
Italy (FIMI)	Gold	15,000^{*}
^{*} Sales figures based on certification alone.

== Release history ==
Region	Date	Label	Format
Italy	16 February 2011	Sugar Music	Digital download (Italian version)
Europe	14 May 2011	Sugar Music	Digital download (English-Italian version)
