= Reality and Fantasy =

Studio album by Raphael Gualazzi
- Released: 16 February 2011
- Genre: Jazz; Blues
- Length: 56:54
- Language: English; Italian
- Label: Sugar Music
- Producer: Raphael Gualazzi

Raphael Gualazzi chronology
Raphael Gualazzi (2010)	Reality and Fantasy (2011)	Happy Mistake (2013)

Singles from Reality and Fantasy
- 1. "Follia d'amore" Released: 16 February 2011; 2. "A Three Second Breath" Released: 8 April 2011; 3. "Calda estate (dove sei)" Released: 17 June 2011

Singles from Reality and Fantasy Special Edition
- 1. "Love Goes Down Slow" Released: 16 September 2011; 2. "Zuccherino dolce" Released: 25 November 2011

Professional ratings
Review scores
Source	Rating
Rolling Stone Italia	3.5/5 stars

Reality and Fantasy is the second studio album by Italian jazz singer Raphael Gualazzi, composed, produced and arranged by Gualazzi himself, it was released in Italy on February 16, 2011 on Sugar Music.

== Background ==
The album features guest artists such as Italian trumpeter Fabrizio Bosso, Ferdinando Arnò, who co-produced the lead single "Follia d'amore", Vince Mendoza, James F. Reynolds, Pete Glenister and French DJ Gilles Peterson. As of June 2012, the album had sold more than 100,000 copies and it was certified platinum by the Federation of the Italian Music Industry. In October 2011, a special edition of the album was released in Italy, including bonus tracks and an additional DVD featuring the "Live Documentary", recorded on June 24, 2011 during Gualazzi's concert at the Auditorium Parco della Musica in Rome. A new edition of the album was released in France by Blue Note Records in September 2012.

== Singles ==
The first single from the album, "Follia d'amore", was the winner of the 61st Sanremo Music Festival in the newcomer artists' section and also won the Critics' "Mia Martini" Award for newcomers. It was chosen by a specific jury among the participants at the Sanremo Festival to be the Italian entry for the Eurovision Song Contest 2011 in Düsseldorf, Germany. It was the first Italian entry at the Eurovision Song Contest in 14 years since 1997. The song, performed in both Italian and English with the translated title "Madness of Love", came in second place. Other singles from the album were "A Three Second Breath", "Calda estate (dove sei)", "Love Goes Down Slow" and "Zuccherino dolce".

== Track listing ==
No.	Title	Lyrics	Music	Length
1.	"Follia d'amore"	Raphael Gualazzi; Ferdinando Arnò	Gualazzi	3:35
2.	"Icarus"	Gualazzi	Gualazzi	4:01
3.	"Tuesday"	Gualazzi	Gualazzi; Fio Zanotti	4:59
4.	"Reality and Fantasy"	Gualazzi	Gualazzi	3:54
5.	"Scandalize Me"	Gualazzi	Gualazzi	3:13
6.	"Behind the Sunrise" (feat. Rox)	Gualazzi	Gualazzi	4:17
7.	"A Three Second Breath"	Gualazzi	Gualazzi	3:36
8.	"Calda estate (dove sei)"	Gualazzi	Gualazzi	3:01
9.	"Out of My Mind"	Gualazzi	Gualazzi	3:38
10.	"Sarò sarai"	Gualazzi; Oliviero Malaspina	Gualazzi; Zanotti	5:16
11.	"Love Goes Down Slow"	Gualazzi	Gualazzi; Zanotti	3:51
12.	"Lady 'O'"	Gualazzi	Gualazzi	4:32
13.	"Empty Home"	Raphael Gualazzi	Gualazzi; Zanotti	3:18
14.	"Caravan"	Irving Mills	Duke Ellington; Juan Tizol	2:17
15.	"Reality And Fantasy" (Gilles Peterson remix)	Gualazzi	Gualazzi	3:26

iTunes bonus track
No.	Title	Lyrics	Music	Length
16.	"Don't Stop"	Christine McVie	McVie	3:15

Special Edition (CD) bonus tracks
No.	Title	Lyrics	Music	Length
16.	"Zuccherino dolce"	Oliviero Malaspina	Fiorenzo Zanotti, Raffaele Gualazzi	2:45
17.	"New Orleans"			3:37
18.	"Carola"			3:11
19.	"A Three Second Breath" (Original version)			2:59
20.	"Don't Stop"

iTunes Special Edition bonus tracks
No.	Title	Length
16.	"Zuccherino dolce"	2:45
17.	"New Orleans"	3:37
18.	"Carola"	3:11
19.	"A Three Second Breath" (Original version)	2:59
20.	"Don't Stop"	3:15
21.	"Madness of Love" (Gilles Peterson Remix)	3:40
22.	"Reality and Fantasy" (Alex G. Mix)	3:12

== Charts and certifications ==
=== Weekly charts ===
Chart (2011)	Peak position
Austrian Albums Chart	53
French New Albums Chart	128
German Albums Chart	49
Italian Albums Chart	4

=== Certifications ===
Country	Certification
Italy (FIMI)	Platinum

=== Year-end charts ===
Chart (2011)	Position
Italian Albums Chart	17

== Personnel ==
Credits adapted from Allmusic.

=== Production credits ===
- Ferdinando Arnò – additional production
- Emiliano Alborghetti – assistant
- Laura Borgognoni – art direction, design
- Marco Craig – cover photo, design, photography
- Giuseppe Dicecca – stylist
- David Frazer – engineer, mixing
- Donal Hodgson – engineer, mixing
- Joe LaPorta – mastering
- Emily Lazar – mastering
- Sabrina Mellace – stylist
- Mimmo Di Maggio - Hair and Make Up

=== Music credits ===
- Raphael Gualazzi – vocals, composer, lyricist, producer, kazoo, clavinet, organ, piano, background vocals, Wurlitzer
- Atem Quartet – saxophone
- Abigail Bailey – background vocals
- Lele Barbieri – drums
- David Bartelucci – tenor saxophone
- Fabrizio Bosso – trumpet
- Karl Brazil – drums
- David Brutti – contralto saxophone
- Giuseppe Conte – bass, guitar
- Felice Del Gaudio – electric bass, double bass
- Duke Ellington – composer
- Luca Florian – percussion
- Pete Glenister – guitar, percussion, producer
- Oliviero Malaspina – composer, lyricist
- Christian Marini – drums
- Mr. Wallace – arranger
- Malcolm Moore – bass
- James Reynolds – harmonica, mixing, producer
- Roxanne Tataei – vocals
- Massimo Valentini – baritone sax, saxophone
- Matteo Villa – contralto saxophone
- Fio Zanotti – composer

== Release history ==
Region	Date	Format	Edition	Label
Italy	16 February 2011	CD, digital download	Standard Edition	Sugar Music
Italy	18 October 2011	CD+DVD	Italian Special Edition	Sugar Music
France	10 September 2012	CD, digital download	French Edition	Blue Note Records
