= Perturbazione =

Italian music group

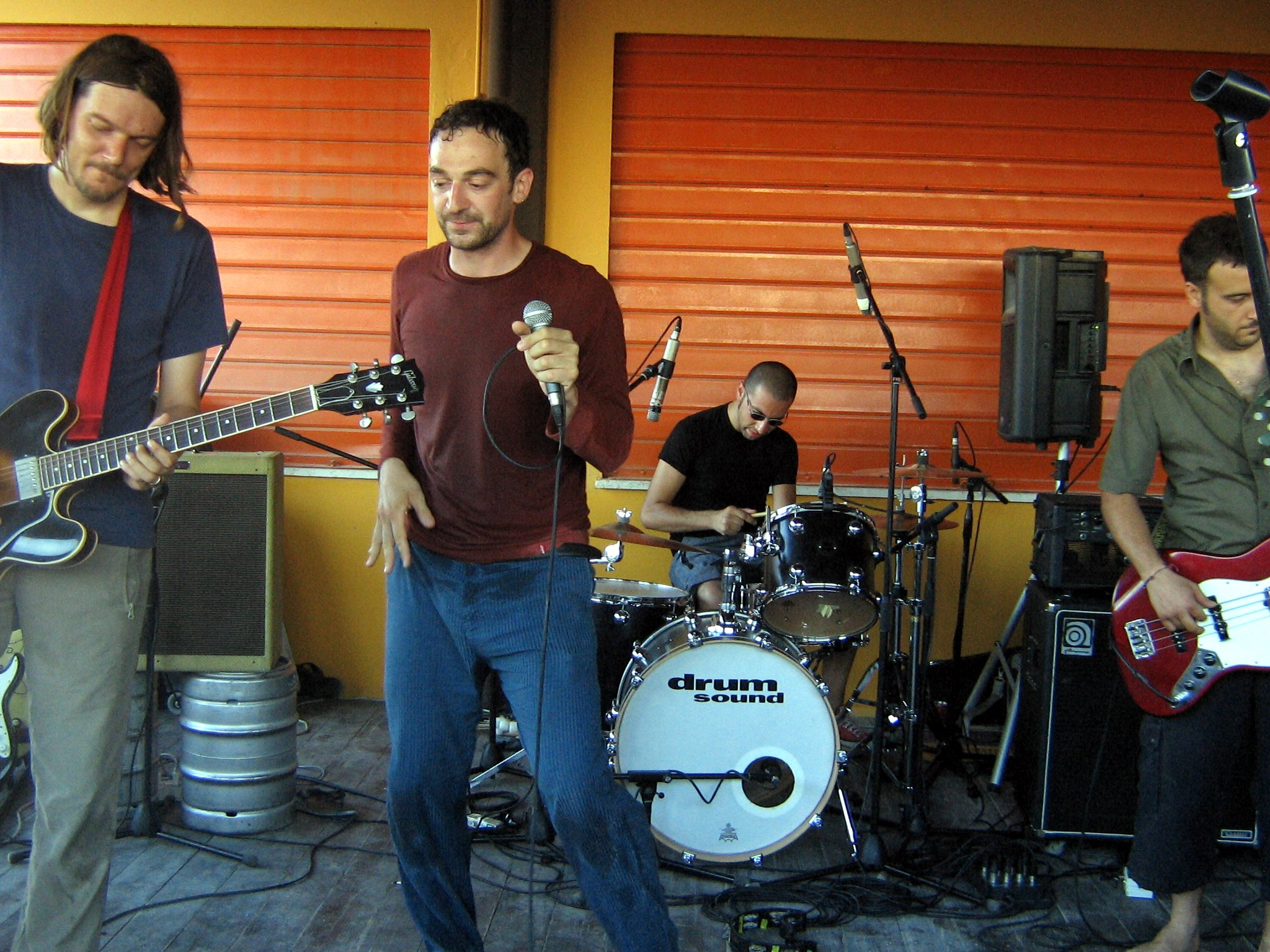

Background information
- Origin: Rivoli, Italy
- Genres: Indie; Pop rock
- Years active: 1988–present
- Members: Tommaso Cerasuolo; Elena Diana; Gigi Giancursi; Cristiano Lo Mele; Rossano Lo Mele
- Past members: Stefano Milano
- Website: perturbazione.com

Perturbazione are an Italian indie pop rock band formed in Rivoli, Italy at the end of the 1980s.

== History ==
In 1988, in Rivoli, Tommaso Cerasuolo (singer), Rossano Antonio Lo Mele (drums) and other two schoolmates founded the band. The following year, Stefano Milano (bass) and Gigi Giancursi (guitar) joined them. Their debut (without the lead singer, who returned in 1991) was in 1990 at the end-of-the-school concert. In 1994, to enrich their sound, Elena Diana (cello and piano) joined the band. Two years later they issued the first single, Corridors/A Huge Mistake. In 1998 their first album Waiting to Happen, entirely sung in English, came out. That very same year, Cristiano Lo Mele (guitar) was the final member to join the band and Italian is chosen as the official language of their songs. At the beginning of 1999 their second album, the EP 36, came out, with five songs in Italian and one in English. Between 1998 and 2002 there were other new songs and gigs. At the beginning of 2002 another new album, In circolo, appeared. The band toured until 2004, with more than 120 gigs. They also were honoured with the award of Best Italian Tour 2003. In 2005 they had a concert tour with the album Canzoni allo specchio. On 13 April 2007 they released a new album, entitled Pianissimo fortissimo (EMI).

In 2008 Stefano Milano left Perturbazione. His replacement was Alex Baracco (bass).

In 2009 two albums appeared Le città viste dal basso, a long play record published in only 999 copies which include all the best songs of the tour of the same name, and Enlarge your English, an LP to download which include 12 songs to teach English in schools.

In 2010 appeared Del Nostro Tempo Rubato, a double album.

The year 2013 saw Perturbazione release Musica X through Mescal they used Max Casacci to help guide their sound towards more electronic music. This would be succeeded by Le storie che ci raccontiamo (Mescal, 2016) And (Dis)amore which came out in 2020.

== Discography ==
- 1998 – Waiting to Happen
- 1998 – 36
- 2002 – In circolo
- 2002 – Waiting to Happen / 36
- 2005 – Canzoni allo specchio
- 2007 – Pianissimo Fortissimo
- 2009 – Le Città Viste dal Basso
- 2009 – Enlarge your English
- 2010 – Del Nostro Tempo Rubato
- 2013 – Musica X
- 2016 – Le storie che ci raccontiamo
- 2020 – (Dis)amore
