= Carosello Records =

Carosello Records is an Italian record label. Carosello distributed the United Artists label in Italy.
