= Raphael Gualazzi =

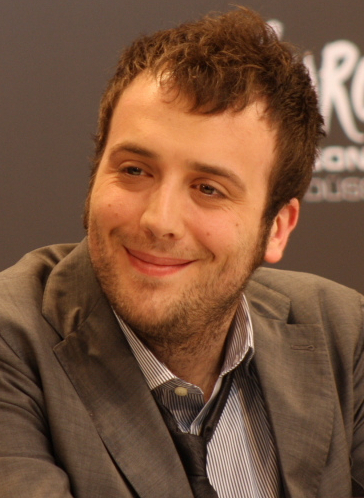
- Gualazzi in 2011

Background information
- Born: Raffaele Gualazzi; 11 November 1981 (age 44); Urbino, Italy
- Genres: Jazz; blues
- Occupation: Singer
- Instruments: Voice; piano
- Years active: 2005–present
- Labels: Sugar Music
- Website: http://www.raphaelgualazzi.com/

Raffaele Gualazzi (born 11 November 1981), better known as Raphael Gualazzi (Italian pronunciation: [ˈraːfael ɡwaˈlattsi]), is an Italian singer and pianist. He was born in Urbino.

== Biography ==
=== Love Outside the Window ===
On 16 September 2005, Gualazzi released his first studio album, titled Love Outside the Window and distributed by Edel Music.

In 2008, Gualazzi recorded a cover of "Georgia on My Mind" for the compilation Piano Jazz, released in France by Wagram Music.

=== Sanremo Festival 2011 ===
In September 2010 he released a self-titled digital EP in Italy and Europe. The EP features a cover of Fleetwood Mac's "Don't Stop" and three new songs written by Gualazzi, including his first single, "Reality and Fantasy". The song was later released in a remix version by British/French DJ Gilles Peterson.

On 18 February 2011, he won the Sanremo Festival in the Newcomers section, the Critics' "Mia Martini" Award for Newcomers and the "Sala Radio-Tv" Award with the self-penned song "Follia d'amore". The song is included in Gualazzi's second studio album, Reality and Fantasy, released on 16 February 2011 by Sugar Music.

=== Eurovision Song Contest 2011 ===
On 19 February 2011, Gualazzi was chosen among the participants at the Sanremo Festival 2011 to represent Italy at the Eurovision Song Contest 2011, held in Düsseldorf, Germany. Gualazzi was the first Italian singer to represent the country since the Eurovision Song Contest 1997. "Madness of Love" as the song title was translated to finished second in the final with 189 points, 32 points behind the winning song "Running Scared".

=== Sanremo Festival 2013 ===
On 13 December 2013, his participation in the "Big Artists" section in the Sanremo Music Festival 2013 is confirmed with the songs "Senza ritegno" and "Sai (ci basta un sogno)". His third studio album, Happy Mistake, is released on 14 February 2013. On 12 February 2013, during the first night of the Sanremo Festival, "Sai (ci basta un sogno)" is chosen as Gualazzi's song for the rest of the competition; the song finished in fifth position in the final.

=== Sanremo Festival 2014 ===
In 2014, he took part in the "Big Artists" section in Sanremo 2014 for the second year in a row, this time together with The Bloody Beetroots, with the songs "Liberi o no" and "Tanto ci sei". They took second place in the final with the song "Liberi o no".

=== Sanremo Festival 2020 ===
He participated at the Sanremo Music Festival 2020 with the song "Carioca".

== Filmography ==
- Oceania - Tamatoa (2016)
- Moana 2 - Tamatoa (2024)

== Awards and nominations ==
Year	Award	Nomination	Work	Result
2011	Nastro d'Argento	Best Original Song	"Follia d'amore"	Nominated
2011	IMPALA European Independent Album of the Year Award	European Independent Album of the Year	Reality and Fantasy	Nominated

Preceded by Jalisse with "Fiumi di parole"	Italy in the Eurovision Song Contest; 2011	Succeeded by Nina Zilli with "L'amore è femmina"
