= Ermal Meta discography =

Discography of Italian singer-songwriter Ermal Meta

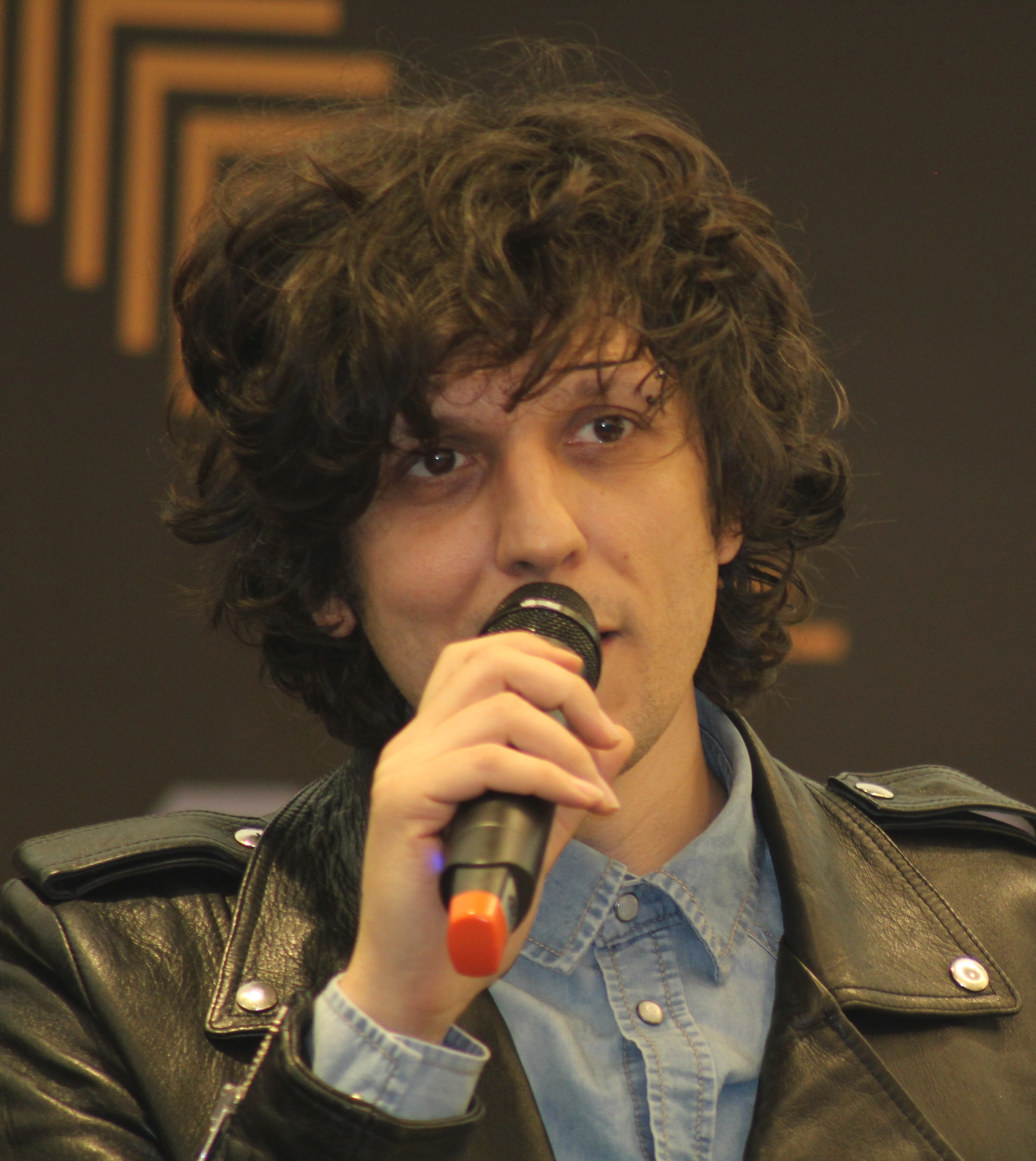
- Ermal Meta performing in the Eurovision Song Contest 2018
- Studio albums: 6
- Live albums: 1
- Singles: 31

Italian singer-songwriter Ermal Meta released six studio albums, one live album and thirty-one singles.

== Albums ==
=== Studio albums ===
Title	Details	Peak chart positions		Certifications
Title	Details	ITA	SWI	Certifications
Umano	Released: 12 February 2016; Label: Mescal; Formats: CD, digital download, streaming	45	—	
Vietato morire	Released: 10 February 2017; Label: Mescal; Formats: CD, digital download, streaming	1	—	FIMI: Platinum
Non abbiamo armi	Released: 9 February 2018; Label: Tetoyoshi Music Italia; Formats: CD, digital download, streaming	1	18	FIMI: Platinum
Tribù urbana	Released: 12 March 2021; Label: Tetoyoshi Music Italia; Formats: CD, digital download, streaming	1	40	
Buona fortuna	Released: 3 May 2024; Label: Columbia Records Italia; Formats: CD, LP, digital download, streaming	8	—	
Funzioni vitali	Released: 27 February 2026; Label: Columbia Records Italia; Formats: CD, LP, digital download, streaming	7	—	
"—" denotes a recording that did not chart or was not released.

=== Live albums ===
Title	Details	Peak chart positions	
Title	Details	ITA	SWI
Non abbiamo armi: Il concerto	Released: 25 January 2019; Label: Sony Music Italia, Mescal; Formats: CD, digital download, streaming	3	73

== Singles ==
=== As lead artist ===
Title	Year	Peak chart positions				Certifications	Album
Title	Year	ITA	FRA	SWE	SWI	Certifications	Album
"Lettera a mio padre"	2014	—	—	—	—		Umano
"Odio le favole"	2015	66	—	—	—		Umano
"Volevo dirti"	2016	—	—	—	—		Umano
"A parte te"	2016	—	—	—	—	FIMI: Gold	Umano
"Gravita con me"	2016	—	—	—	—		Umano
"Vietato morire"	2017	7	—	—	—	FIMI: 2× Platinum	Vietato morire
"Ragazza paradiso"	2017	—	—	—	—	FIMI: Gold	Vietato morire
"Voodoo Love" (featuring Jarabe de Palo)	2017	—	—	—	—		Vietato morire
"Piccola anima" (featuring Elisa)	2017	54	—	—	—	FIMI: Platinum	Vietato morire
"Non mi avete fatto niente" (with Fabrizio Moro)	2018	2	134	20	16	FIMI: Platinum	Non abbiamo armi
"Dall'alba al tramonto"	2018	57	—	—	—	FIMI: Gold	Non abbiamo armi
"Io mi innamoro ancora"	2018	—	—	—	—		Non abbiamo armi
"9 primavere"	2018	—	—	—	—		Non abbiamo armi
"Un'altra volta da rischiare" (featuring J-Ax)	2019	27	—	—	—		Non abbiamo armi il concerto
"Ercole"	2019	—	—	—	—		Non abbiamo armi il concerto
"Finirà bene"	2020	—	—	—	—		Non-album single
"No Satisfaction"	2021	—	—	—	—		Tribù urbana
"Un milione di cose da dirti"	2021	10	—	—	—	FIMI: Gold	Tribù urbana
"Uno"	2021	—	—	—	—		Tribù urbana
"Stelle cadenti"	2021	—	—	—	—		Tribù urbana
"Milano non esiste"	2021	—	—	—	—		Non-album singles
"Una cosa più grande" (featuring Giuliano Sangiorgi)	2022	—	—	—	—		Non-album singles
"Male più non fare" (featuring Jake La Furia)	2023	—	—	—	—		Buona fortuna
"L'unico pericolo"	2024	—	—	—	—		Buona fortuna
"Mediterraneo"	2024	—	—	—	—		Buona fortuna
"Il campione"	2025	—	—	—	—		Buona fortuna
"Ferma gli orologi"	2025	—	—	—	—		Non-album singles
"Io ti conosco"	2025	—	—	—	—		Non-album singles
"Stella stellina"	2026	20	—	—	—		Non-album singles
"—" denotes a recording that did not chart or was not released.

=== As featured artist ===
Title	Year	Peak chart positions	Album
Title	Year	ITA	Album
"Non mi interessa" (Patty Pravo featuring Ermal Meta)	2013	97	Non-album single
"Normale" (Francesco Renga featuring Ermal Meta)	2019	—	L'altra metà
"Mi manca" (Bugo featuring Ermal Meta)	2020	—	Cristian Bugatti
"—" denotes a recording that did not chart or was not released.

== Credits ==
Title	Year	Album
"Tutto si muove"	2014	Braccialetti rossi OST
"Volevo perdonarti, almeno" (featuring Niccolò Agliardi)	2015	Braccialetti rossi 2 OST
"Piccoli problemi di cuore" (Cristina D'Avena featuring Ermal Meta)	2017	Duets – Tutti cantano Cristina
"Un pallone" (Enrico Ruggeri featuring Ermal Meta)	2019	Alma
