= Fabrizio Moro discography =

Discography of Italian singer-songwriter Fabrizio Moro

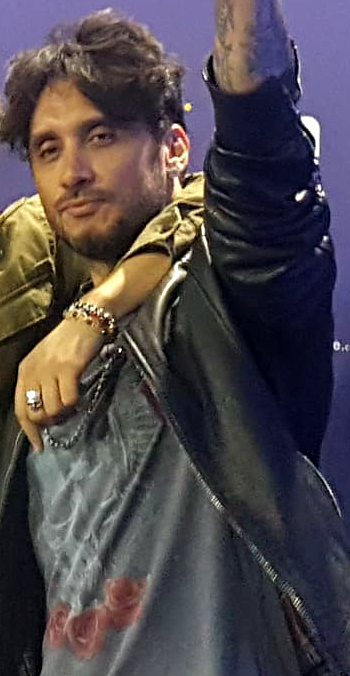
- Fabrizio Moro at the Eurovision Song Contest 2018
- Studio albums: 10
- EPs: 3
- Live albums: 1
- Compilation albums: 3
- Singles: 41

The discography of Italian singer-songwriter Fabrizio Moro consists of ten studio albums, one live album, three compilations, three EPs and forty-one singles.

== Albums ==
=== Studio albums ===
List of studio albums, with chart positions and certifications
Title	Details	Peak chart positions		Certifications
Title	Details	ITA	SWI	Certifications
Fabrizio Moro	Released: 2000; Label: Ricordi; Format: CD	—	—	
Ognuno ha quel che si merita	Released: 2005; Label: Don't Worry Records; Format: CD, digital download	—	—	
Pensa	Released: 2 March 2007; Label: La Ciliegia, Warner Music Italy; Format: CD, digital download	15	36	FIMI: Gold
Domani	Released: 29 February 2008; Label: La Ciliegia, Warner Music Italy; Format: CD, digital download	23	62	FIMI: Gold
Ancora Barabba	Released: 19 February 2010; Label: Warner Music; Format: CD, digital download	39	—	
L'inizio	Released: 30 April 2013; Label: La Fattoria del Moro; Format: CD, digital download	13	—	
Via delle Girandole 10	Released: 17 March 2015; Label: La Fattoria del Moro; Format: CD, digital download	10	—	
Pace	Released: 10 March 2017; Label: Sony Music; Format: CD, digital download	2	37	FIMI: Gold
Figli di nessuno	Released: 12 April 2019; Label: Sony Music; Format: CD, digital download	2	45	
La mia voce	Released: 4 February 2022; Label: Warner; Format: CD, digital download	7	—	
La mia voce vol. 2	Released: 19 May 2023; Label: Warner; Format: CD, digital download	8	—	
Non ho paura di niente	Released: 14 November 2025; Label: BMG Rights Management; Format: CD, digital download	7	—	
"—" denotes a recording that did not chart or was not released.

=== Live albums ===
List of studio albums, with chart positions and certifications
Title	Details	Peak chart positions
Title	Details	ITA
Atlantico Live	Released: 8 November 2011; Label: Edel; Format: 2× CD+DVD, digital download	40

=== Compilation albums ===
Title	Details	Peak chart positions		Certifications
Title	Details	ITA	SWI	Certifications
Il meglio di Fabrizio Moro - Grandi successi	Released: 20 May 2016; Label: Nar International; Format: CD, digital download	74	—	
Parole rumori e anni	Released: 9 February 2018; Label: Sony Music, RCA Records; Format: CD, digital download	3	75	FIMI: Gold
Canzoni d'amore nascoste	Released: 20 November 2020; Label: La Fattoria del Moro, Believe; Format: CD, digital download	4	—	

== Extended plays ==
List of EPs and with selected chart positions
Title	Details	Peak chart positions
Title	Details	ITA
Barabba	Released: 5 June 2009; Label: Warner Music Italy; Format: CD, digital download	39
La mia voce	Released: 2022; Label: Warner Music Italy; Format: CD, digital download	—
La mia voce vol. 2	Released: May 2023; Label: Warner Music Italy; Format: CD, digital download	—
"—" denotes EP that did not chart or were not released.

== Singles ==
=== As lead artist ===
List of singles, with chart positions and certifications, showing year released and album name
Title	Year	Peak chart positions				Certifications	Album or EP
Title	Year	ITA	FRA	SWE Heat.	SWI	Certifications	Album or EP
"Per tutta un'altra destinazione"	1996	—	—	—	—		Fabrizio Moro
"Un giorno senza fine"	2000	—	—	—	—		Fabrizio Moro
"Eppure pretendevi di essere chiamata amore"	2004	—	—	—	—		Ognuno ha quel che si merita
"Ci vuole un business"	2005	—	—	—	—		Ognuno ha quel che si merita
"Pensa"	2007	1	—	—	38	FIMI: Gold	Pensa
"Fammi sentire la voce"	2007	—	—	—	—		Pensa
"Parole rumori e giorni"	2007	—	—	—	—		Pensa
"Eppure mi hai cambiato la vita"	2008	8	—	—	—		Domani
"Libero"	2008	22	—	—	—		Domani
"Il senso di ogni cosa"	2009	9	—	—	—	FIMI: Platinum	Ancora Barabba
"Barabba"	2009	—	—	—	—		Ancora Barabba
"Non è una canzone"	2010	—	—	—	—		Ancora Barabba
"Respiro"	2011	—	—	—	—		Atlantico Live
"Fermi con le mani"	2011	—	—	—	—		Atlantico Live
"Sono come sono"	2013	54	—	—	—		L'inizio
"L'eternità"	2013	—	—	—	—		L'inizio
"Babbo Natale esiste"	2013	—	—	—	—		L'inizio
"Acqua"	2015	—	—	—	—		Via delle Girandole 10
"Alessandra sarà sempre più bella"	2015	—	—	—	—		Via delle Girandole 10
"Sono anni che ti aspetto"	2016	—	—	—	—		Pace
"Portami via"	2017	6	—	—	—	FIMI: 2× Platinum	Pace
"Andiamo"	2017	—	—	—	—		Pace
"La felicità"	2017	—	—	—	—		Pace
"Non mi avete fatto niente" (with Ermal Meta)	2018	2	134	20	16	FIMI: Platinum	Parole rumori e anni
"L'eternità (il mio quartiere)" (featuring Ultimo)	2018	71	—	—	—	FIMI: Gold	Parole rumori e anni
"Ho bisogno di credere"	2019	56	—	—	—		Figli di nessuno
"Figli di nessuno (amianto)" (featuring Anastasio)	2019	—	—	—	—		Figli di nessuno
"Per me"	2019	—	—	—	—		Figli di nessuno
"Il senso di ogni cosa"	2020	—	—	—	—	FIMI: Gold	Canzoni d'amore nascoste
"Melodia di giugno"	2020	—	—	—	—		Canzoni d'amore nascoste
"Voglio stare con te"	2021	—	—	—	—		Canzoni d'amore nascoste
"Sei tu"	2022	20	—	—	—	FIMI: Gold	La mia voce
"Oggi"	2022	—	—	—	—		La mia voce
"La mia voce"	2022	—	—	—	—		La mia voce
"Senza di te"	2022	—	—	—	—		La mia voce vol.2
"Tutta la voglia di vivere"	2023	—	—	—	—		La mia voce vol.2
"Dove"	2023	—	—	—	—		La mia voce vol.2
"Maledetta estate"	2024	—	—	—	—		Non-album single
"Prima di domani" (with Il Tre)	2025	—	—	—	—		Non ho paura di niente
"In un mondo di stronzi"	2025	—	—	—	—		Non ho paura di niente
"Non ho paura di niente"	2025	—	—	—	—		Non ho paura di niente
"Scatole"	2025	—	—	—	—		Non ho paura di niente
"Comunque mi vedi"	2025	—	—	—	—		Non ho paura di niente
"Simone spaccia"	2026	—	—	—	—		Non ho paura di niente
"—" denotes a recording that did not chart or was not released.

=== As featured artist ===
List of singles as featured artist, showing year released and album name
Title	Year	Album
"I nostri anni" (Stadio featuring Fabrizio Moro)	2012	30 I nostri anni
"Portami via" (Eddie Brock featuring Fabrizio Moro)	2026	Amarsi è la rivoluzione (Deluxe)

== Writing credits ==
List of songs written for other artists
Title	Year	Artist(s)	Album
"Resta come sei"	2009	Stadio	Diluvio universale
"Sono solo parole"	2012	Noemi	RossoNoemi
"Se non è amore"	2012	Noemi	RossoLive
"Buongiorno alla vita"	2012	Noemi	RossoLive
"I nostri anni"	2012	Stadio	30 I nostri anni
"Crotone"	2013	Il Parto delle Nuvole Pesanti	Che aria tira
"La mia felicità"	2013	Emma	Schiena
"Finalmente piove"	2016	Valerio Scanu	Finalmente piove
"Un'altra vita"	2016	Elodie	Un'altra vita
"Giorni spensierati"	2016	Elodie	Un'altra vita
"I pensieri di Zo"	2016	Fiorella Mannoia	Combattente
"I miei passi"	2016	Fiorella Mannoia	Combattente
