= Cherofobia =

Single by Martina Attili

from the EP Cherofobia
- Language: Italian
- Released: 23 November 2018
- Length: 2:51
- Label: Sony Music
- Songwriter: Martina Attili
- Producers: Manuel Agnelli; Enrico Brun

Martina Attili singles chronology
"Cherofobia" (2018)	"La somma" (2019)

Music video
- "Cherofobia" on YouTube

"Cherofobia" ("Cherophobia") is the debut song by Italian singer-songwriter Martina Attili, released by Sony Music on 23 November 2018.

The song gained popularity during the singer's participation in the twelfth season of X Factor.

== Composition ==
The song was written three years prior to her X Factor performance, while she was undergoing foot surgery. Originally, it was dedicated to a boy she couldn't confess her feelings to. As the title suggests, the song addresses cherophobia, a form of anxiety characterized by the fear of happiness.

The song was first introduced to the public during the X Factor auditions and was released as a single a few months later, in November 2018, following her advancement to the semi-finals. The final version was reworked with the involvement of Manuel Agnelli, her mentor on the show, and Enrico Brun, who also handled the production.

== Reception ==
Attili's performance of "Cherofobia" during the X Factor auditions was well received by both the audience and the jury, and the song went viral even before the live shows began. Although she was eliminated in the semifinals, finishing in sixth place, her single achieved good success, reaching number two on the FIMI chart and being certified a platinum record. The video of her X Factor audition was the most viewed in Italy on YouTube according to YouTube Rewind.

The song also helped bringing attention to the condition of cherophobia and anxiety management. The term "cherophobia" was one of the most searched in Italy on Google in 2018.

== Music video ==
A music video of "Cherofobia", directed by Giacomo Triglia, was released on 13 December 2018 via Attili's YouTube channel.

== Charts ==
Weekly chart performance for "Cherofobia"
Chart (2018)	Peak position
Italy (FIMI)	2
Italy Airplay (EarOne)	64

== Certifications ==
Region	Certification	Certified units/sales
Italy (FIMI)	Platinum	50,000^{‡}
^{‡} Sales+streaming figures based on certification alone.
