= Martina Attili =

Italian singer-songwriter (born 2001)

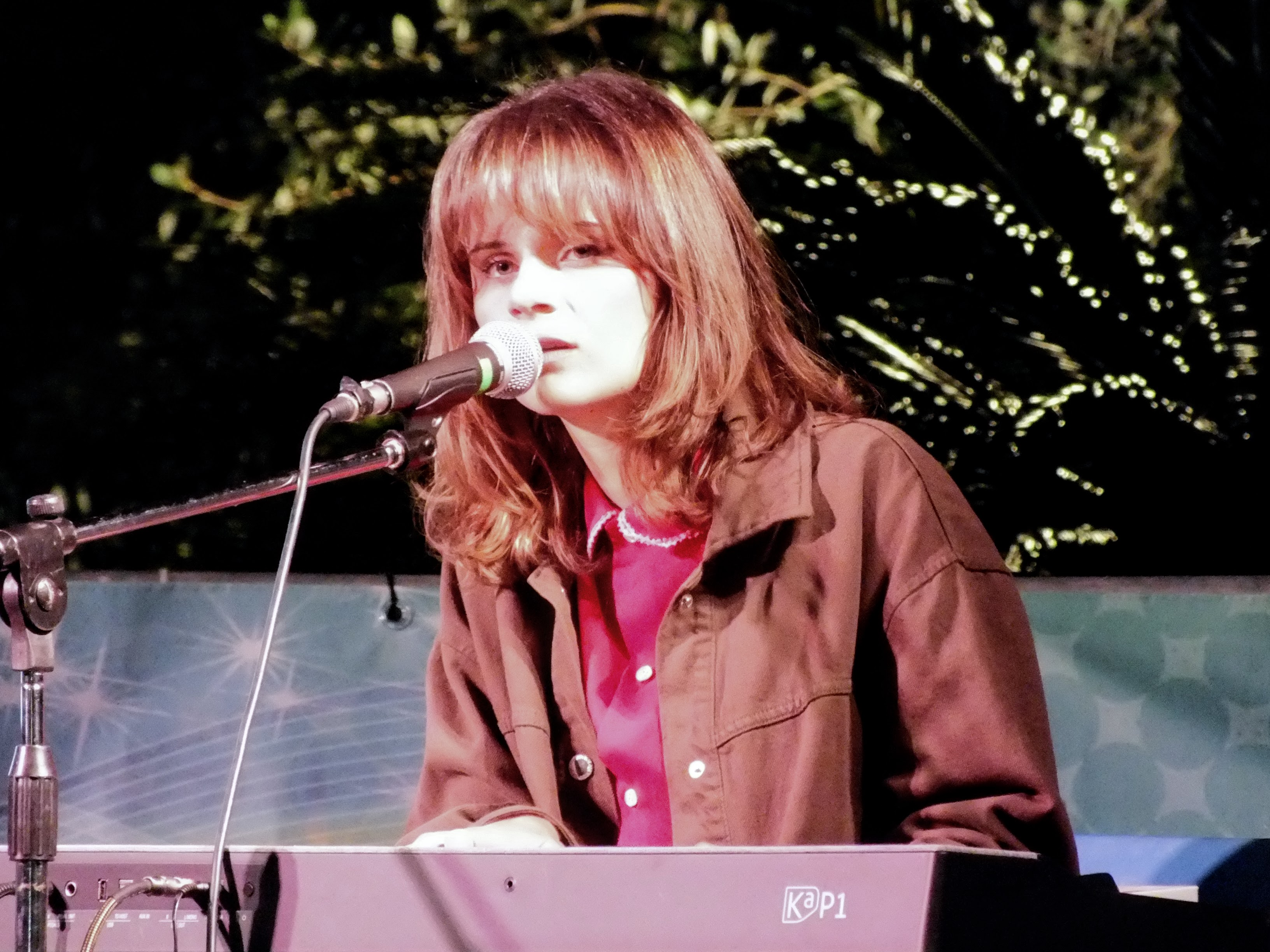
- Attili at Palazzo Rocca, Chiavari, in 2025

Background information
- Born: 11 July 2001 (age 25); Rome, Italy
- Genres: Pop
- Occupations: Singer; songwriter; novelist; actress
- Years active: 2017–present

Martina Attili (born 11 July 2001) is an Italian singer, songwriter and actress.

She gained recognition at the age of seventeen with her participation in the 12th season of X Factor in 2018. Her debut single "Cherofobia" achieved success in Italy by reaching second place on the FIMI chart and was certified platinum. She has served as an ambassador for the National Center against Bullying and participated in several stage musicals between 2022 and 2024. Her debut album, Signorina rivoluzione, was released in 2025.

Her themes focus on introspection and raising awareness about social issues such as mental health, bullying, feminism, and religion.

== Life and career ==
=== Early years ===
Born in Rome in 2001, Attili began studying music at the age of six and started writing and composing her first songs at fourteen. She attended the Accademia Spettacolo Italia and appeared in small roles in the television series Un medico in famiglia, Che Dio ci aiuti, and L'onore e il rispetto.

In 2017, she won the local "Piero Calabrese" Award, and participated in the selections for Area Sanremo with the song "Un incubo ogni giorno", reaching the top eight finalists. She was not ultimately selected for the Newcomers' section of the Sanremo Music Festival 2018.

=== 2018–2020: X Factor, "Cherofobia" and career debut ===
In 2018, at the age of seventeen, she took part in the auditions for the twelfth season of X Factor with an original song she wrote and arranged herself, entitled "Cherofobia". Her performance was well received by both the audience and the jury, and the song went viral even before the live shows began. Attili joined the team mentored by Manuel Agnelli and during the show performed songs such as "Castle in the Snow", "Material Girl", "Sober", and "It's Oh So Quiet", before releasing her original song "Cherofobia" into the music market on 23 November 2018. Although she was eliminated in the semifinals, finishing in sixth place, her single achieved great success, reaching number two on the FIMI chart and being certified a platinum record. The video of her X Factor audition was the most viewed in Italy on YouTube according to YouTube Rewind. The song also helped bringing attention to the condition of cherophobia and anxiety management. The term "cherophobia" was one of the most searched in Italy on Google in 2018.

On 14 December 2018, Attili released the EP of the same name, which also included the main songs she performed on X Factor. The EP reached number 64 on the FIMI albums chart. Subsequently, Attili embarked on the "Cherofobia Tour" in major Italian cities, with the first date on 4 May 2019 at the Auditorium Parco della Musica in Rome. On 17 May, she participated in the single "La somma" with Mr. Rain, which peaked at number 44 on the charts and was awarded a gold record. In December of the same year, she released the single "Piccoli eroi", a song against bullying.

In 2020, Attili published her first novel, Baci amari e musica d'autore, with Longanesi. In that same year, she made her acting debut by joining the cast of the second season of RAI teen series Jams.

=== 2021–2025: Musicals and Signorina rivoluzione ===
During the COVID-19 pandemic, Attili paused her activities, only releasing some tracks on YouTube and SoundCloud, such as "Prima liceo" in July 2021. She became a spokesperson for the National Center against Bullying "Bulli Stop" and, in 2022, she toured Italy starring in the musical Bullo Man, alongside Leo Gassmann and Matteo Valentini, promoted by the same association. In the 2023–2024 theatrical season, she played Tiger Lily in Maurizio Colombi's musical Peter Pan, performing at Teatro Brancaccio.

On 10 May 2024, Attili released the song "Malinconia", the lead single from her next album. During the year, she also released the singles "Occhi blu" and "Eva e Adamo", on 4 October and 22 November, respectively. Her first studio album, Signorina rivoluzione, was released on 9 May 2025. The album was preceded in April by the single of the same name, from which a music video was made, directed by Nicole Rossi, and published on YouTube on 3 May. The promotional tour for the album began on 12 May in Milan.

=== 2026–present: New projects ===
In April 2026, Attili returned with a new project releasing the single "Caro X", in collaboration with the punk band Vintage Violence. In June 2026, she released the duet "È finita" with Pierdavide Carone, with whom she had previously collaborated on a track from her debut album the previous year. By that time, the two had also begun a romantic relationship.

== Discography ==
=== Studio albums ===
Title	Album details
Signorina rivoluzione	Release date: 9 May 2025; Label: Zoo Dischi, ADA

=== EPs ===
Title	EP details	Peak chart positions
Title	EP details	ITA
Cherofobia	Release date: 14 December 2018; Label: Sony Music	64

=== Singles ===
As lead artist

Title	Year	Peak chart positions	Certifications	Album/EP
Title	Year	ITA	Certifications	Album/EP
"Cherofobia"	2018	2	FIMI: Platinum	Cherofobia
"Piccoli eroi"	2019	—		Non-album singles
"Amoreterno" (with Michelangelo Vizzini)	2023	—		Non-album singles
"Malinconia"	2024	—		Signorina rivoluzione
"Occhi blu"	2024	—		Signorina rivoluzione
"Eva e Adamo"	2024	—		Signorina rivoluzione
"Signorina rivoluzione"	2025	—		Signorina rivoluzione
"Caro X" (featuring Vintage Violence)	2026	—		Non-album singles
"È finita" (with Pierdavide Carone)	2026	—		Non-album singles

As featured artist

List of singles, with chart positions, album name and certifications
Single	Year	Peak chart positions	Certifications	Album
Single	Year	ITA	Certifications	Album
"La somma" (Mr. Rain featuring Martina Attili)	2019	44	FIMI: Gold	Non-album single

== Filmography ==
Television
Year	Title	Role	Notes
2020–2022	Jams	Herself	Recurring role (seasons 2–4)
2025	Overacting	Luna	Main role

== Television programs ==
Year	Broadcaster	Title	Role	Notes
2018	Sky Uno	X Factor	Contestant	Talent show (season 12)

== Books ==
- Martina Attili (2020). Baci amari e musica d'autore. Milan: Longanesi.
