= Mudimbi =

Italian singer and rapper

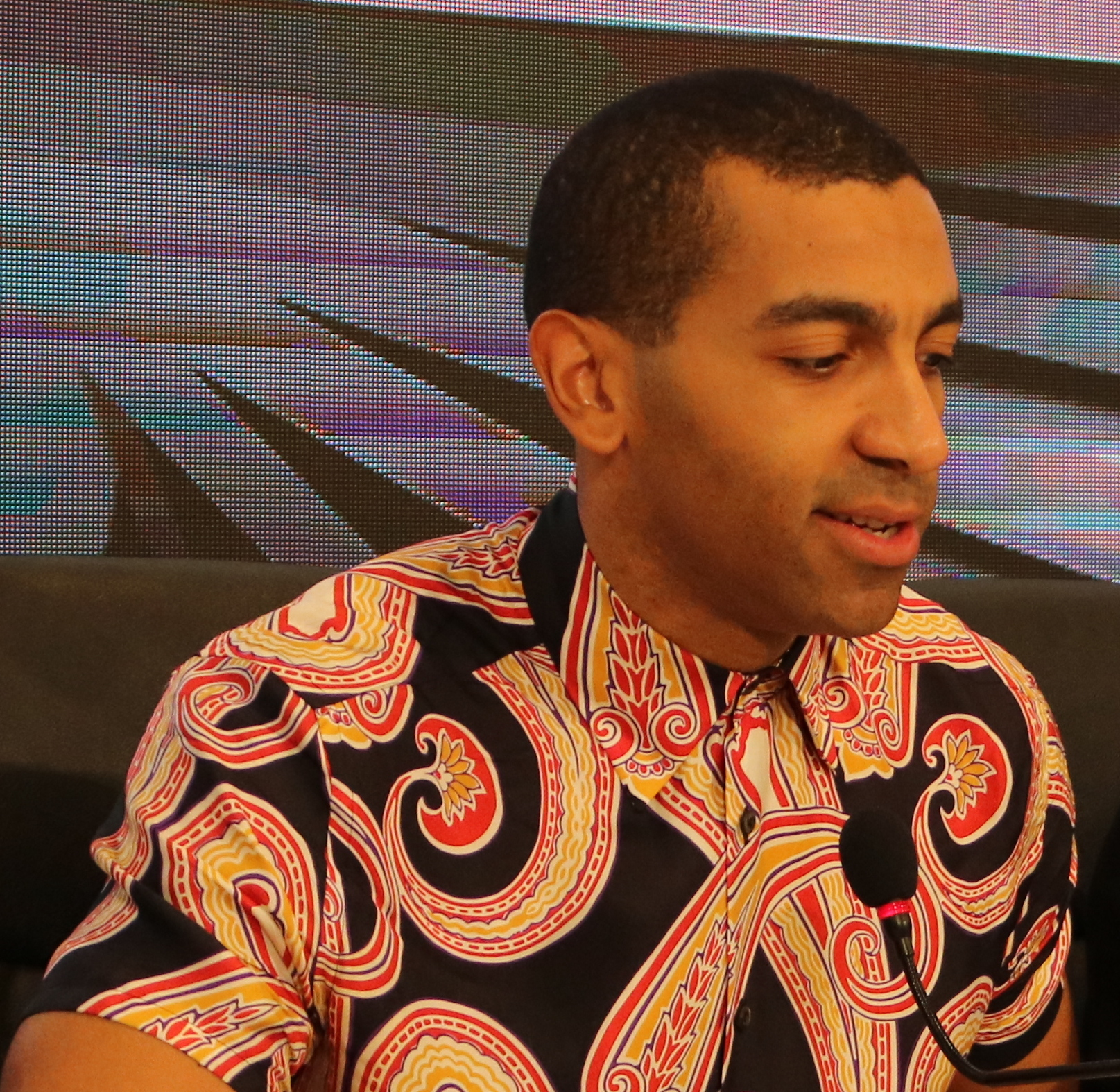
- Mudimbi in 2018
- Born: Michel Mudimbi; 17 October 1986 (age 39); San Benedetto del Tronto, Italy
- Occupation: Singer
- Years active: 2013–present

Michel Mudimbi, known as Mudimbi, is an Italian singer and rapper. He was born in San Benedetto del Tronto and started to approach rap music at the age of fourteen. After the school, he started to work as a mechanic. In 2012, he started to work as a musician with the song "Erbavoglio", and the next year he created a new song entitled "Supercalifrigida". In 2014 the singer published "M", which contained five songs. At the age of 30, he quit his office job to dedicate his entire career to music. On 5 December 2016 his new Vevo YouTube channel published the music video of his new song, "Tipi da Club".

In 2017 Mudimbi signed a deal with Warner Music Group and published the music video of his song entitled "Schifo".

In December 2017 his new song "Il Mago" was admitted in the Sanremo Music Festival 2018 in the "new proposal" category. He arrived third in the classification and won the Premio Assomusica for the best performance.

On 9 February 2018 his album "Michel" was acclaimed by several people and by the magazine "Rockol".
