= X Factor (Italian TV series) season 12 =

X Factor
- Season 12
- Hosted by: Alessandro Cattelan
- Judges: Lodo Guenzi (Live Shows); Fedez; Asia Argento (Auditions-Judges Houses); Manuel Agnelli; Mara Maionchi
- Winner: Anastasio
- Winning mentor: Mara Maionchi
- Runner-up: Naomi Rivieccio

Release
- Original network: Sky Uno; TV8
- Original release: 6 September – 13 December 2018

Season chronology
- ← Previous; Season 11 Next → Season 13

X Factor is an Italian television music competition to find new singing talent; the winner receives a recording contract with Sony Music. Fedez and Manuel Agnelli have been as judges and mentors, Mara Maionchi is returned, also Alessandro Cattelan was confirmed as host. The twelfth season was aired on Sky Uno and TV8 since September 2018. Asia Argento was part of the season line up but was subsequently removed following sexual abuse allegations Lodo Guenzi replaced her in the live shows.

== Judges' houses ==
The "Home Visit" is the final phase before the Live Shows. In this phase, the contestants who passed the "Bootcamp" had to perform one last time in front of their specific judge, in four different locations. At the end of this audition, the top twelve contestants were chosen.

The eight eliminated acts were:

- Boys: Leonardo Parmeggiani, Pierfrancesco "Pjero" Criscitiello
- Girls: Camilla Musso, Ilaria Pieri
- 25+: ~~Facundo Gaston Gordillo~~ (withdrew), Jennifer Milan
- Groups: Inquietude, Moka Stone

== Contestants and categories ==
Key:

– Winner
– Runner-up
– Third place

Category (mentor)	Acts		
Boys (Maionchi)	Anastasio (Marco Anastasio)	Emanuele Bertelli	Leo Gassmann
Girls (Agnelli)	Martina Attili	Luna Melis	Sherol dos Santos
25+ (Fedez)	Renza Castelli	Matteo Costanzo	Naomi Rivieccio
Groups (Guenzi)	BowLand	Red Bricks Foundation	Seveso Casino Palace

== Live shows ==
=== Results summary ===
The number of votes received by each act will be released by Sky Italia after the final.

Colour key

–	Contestant was in the bottom two/three and had to sing again in the final showdown
–	Contestant was in the bottom three but was saved
–	Contestant was in the bottom three but received the fewest votes and was immediately eliminated
–	Contestant received the fewest public votes and was immediately eliminated (no final showdown)
–	Contestant received the most public votes

Weekly results per contestant
Contestant	Week 1		Week 2		Week 3		Week 4			Week 5		Quarter-final	Semi-final		Final		
Contestant	Part 1	Part 2	Part 1	Part 2	Part 1	Part 2	Part 1	Part 2	Part 3	Part 1	Part 2	Quarter-final	Round 1	Round 2	Round 1	Round 2	Round 3
Anastasio	1st	—N/a	—N/a	1st	—N/a	1st	—N/a	—N/a	1st	1st	—N/a	1st	1st	2nd	1st	1st	Winner; 70,03%
Naomi Rivieccio	—N/a	4th	3rd	—N/a	4th	—N/a	—N/a	3rd	—N/a	—N/a	4th	2nd	2nd	1st	2nd	2nd	Runner-up; 29,97%
Luna Melis	2nd	—N/a	2nd	—N/a	2nd	—N/a	—N/a	—N/a	3rd	2nd	—N/a	5th	4th	4th	3rd	3rd	Eliminated (final)
BowLand	—N/a	2nd	—N/a	2nd	1st	—N/a	—N/a	—N/a	2nd	—N/a	2nd	3rd	3rd	3rd	4th	Eliminated (final)	
Leo Gassmann	3rd	—N/a	4th	—N/a	—N/a	3rd	—N/a	2nd	—N/a	—N/a	3rd	6th	5th	5th	Eliminated (semi-final)		
Martina Attili	—N/a	1st	1st	—N/a	—N/a	2nd	1st	—N/a	—N/a	—N/a	1st	4th	6th	Eliminated (semi-final)			
Sherol dos Santos	—N/a	3rd	—N/a	3rd	3rd	—N/a	—N/a	1st	—N/a	3rd	—N/a	7th	Eliminated (quarter-final)				
Renza Castelli	5th	—N/a	—N/a	4th	—N/a	4th	2nd	—N/a	—N/a	4th	—N/a	Eliminated (Week 5)					
Seveso Casino Palace	4th	—N/a	5th	—N/a	—N/a	5th	3rd	—N/a	—N/a	Eliminated (Week 4)							
Emanuele Bertelli	—N/a	5th	—N/a	5th	5th	—N/a	Eliminated (Week 3)										
Red Bricks Foundation	6th	—N/a	6th	—N/a	Eliminated (Week 2)												
Matteo Costanzo	—N/a	6th	Eliminated (Week 1)														
Final showdown	Matteo Costanzo; Red Bricks Foundation		Emanuele Bertelli; Red Bricks Foundation		Emanuele Bertelli; Seveso Casino Palace		Seveso Casino Palace; Naomi Rivieccio			Renza Castelli; Naomi Rivieccio		Sherol dos Santos; Leo Gassmann	Luna Melis; Leo Gassmann		No final showdown or judges' vote: results will be based on public votes alone		
Judges' vote to eliminate															No final showdown or judges' vote: results will be based on public votes alone		
Agnelli's vote	Matteo Costanzo		Emanuele Bertelli		Emanuele Bertelli		Naomi Rivieccio			Naomi Rivieccio		Leo Gassmann	Leo Gassmann		No final showdown or judges' vote: results will be based on public votes alone		
Fedez's vote	Red Bricks Foundation		Red Bricks Foundation		Seveso Casino Palace		Seveso Casino Palace			Renza Castelli		Sherol Dos Santos	Leo Gassmann		No final showdown or judges' vote: results will be based on public votes alone		
Guenzi's vote	Matteo Costanzo		Emanuele Bertelli		Emanuele Bertelli		Naomi Rivieccio			Renza Castelli		Leo Gassmann	Luna Melis		No final showdown or judges' vote: results will be based on public votes alone		
Maionchi's vote	Matteo Costanzo		Red Bricks Foundation		Seveso Casino Palace		Seveso Casino Palace			Naomi Rivieccio		Sherol dos Santos	Luna Melis		No final showdown or judges' vote: results will be based on public votes alone		
Eliminated	Matteo Costanzo; 3 of 4 votes majority		Red Bricks Foundation; Public vote to save		Emanuele Bertelli; Public vote to save		Seveso Casino Palace; Public vote to save			Renza Castelli; Public vote to save		Sherol dos Santos; Public vote to save	Martina Attili; Public vote to save	Leo Gassmann; Public vote to save	BowLand; 4th place	Luna Melis; 3rd place	Naomi Rivieccio; Runner-up
Eliminated	Matteo Costanzo; 3 of 4 votes majority		Red Bricks Foundation; Public vote to save		Emanuele Bertelli; Public vote to save		Seveso Casino Palace; Public vote to save			Renza Castelli; Public vote to save		Sherol dos Santos; Public vote to save	Martina Attili; Public vote to save	Leo Gassmann; Public vote to save	BowLand; 4th place	Luna Melis; 3rd place	Anastasio; Winner

=== Live show details ===
==== Week 1 (25 October) ====
- Celebrity performers: Måneskin ("Torna a casa") and Rita Ora ("Let You Love Me")

Contestants' performances on the first live show
Part 1
Act	Order	Song	Result
Seveso Casino Palace	1	"Giovane fuoriclasse"	Safe
Leo Gassmann	2	"Broken Strings"	Safe
Luna Melis	3	"E.T."	Safe
Renza Castelli	4	"Raggamuffin"	Safe
Red Bricks Foundation	5	"New Rules"	Bottom two
Anastasio	6	"C'è tempo"	Safe
Part 2
Act	Order	Song	Result
Naomi Rivieccio	7	"Love On Top"	Safe
BowLand	8	"Sweet Dreams (Are Made of This)"	Safe
Sherol dos Santos	9	"Can't Feel My Face"	Safe
Emanuele Bertelli	10	"Impossible"	Safe
Matteo Costanzo	11	"Power"	Bottom two
Martina Attili	12	"Castle in the Snow"	Safe
Final showdown details
Act	Order	Song	Result
Red Bricks Foundation	13	"Un ragazzo di strada"	Safe
Matteo Costanzo	14	"La descrizione di un attimo"	Eliminated

Judges' votes to eliminate

- Agnelli: Matteo Costanzo – gave no reason.
- Guenzi: Matteo Costanzo – backed his own act, Red Bricks Foundation.
- Fedez: Red Bricks Foundation – backed his own act, Matteo Costanzo.
- Maionchi: Matteo Costanzo – gave no reason.

==== Week 2 (1 November) ====
- Celebrity performers: Sting, Shaggy ("Gotta Get Back My Baby") and Dark Polo Gang ("Cambiare adesso")

Contestants' performances on the first live show
Part 1
Act	Order	Song	Result
Luna Melis	1	"God Is a Woman"/"I Do"	Safe
Leo Gassmann	2	"Next to Me"	Safe
Seveso Casino Palace	3	"Amore e capoeira"	Safe
Naomi Rivieccio	4	"Never Enough"	Safe
Martina Attili	5	"Sober"	Safe
Red Bricks Foundation	6	"Thoiry"	Bottom two
Part 2
Act	Order	Song	Result
Emanuele Bertelli	7	"Zingarello"	Bottom two
BowLand	8	"No Roots"	Safe
Renza Castelli	9	"Thunderclouds"	Safe
Sherol dos Santos	10	"Rank & File"	Safe
Anastasio	11	"Se piovesse il tuo nome"	Safe
Final showdown details
Act	Order	Song	Result
Red Bricks Foundation	12	"Have Love, Will Travel"	Eliminated
Emanuele Bertelli	13	"Human"	Safe

Judges' votes to eliminate

- Guenzi: Emanuele Bertelli – backed his own act, Red Bricks Foundation.
- Maionchi: Red Bricks Foundation – backed her own act, Emanuele Bertelli.
- Fedez: Emanuele Bertelli – gave no reason.
- Agnelli: Red Bricks Foundation – could not decide so chose to take it to deadlock.

With the acts in the sing-off receiving two votes each, the result went to deadlock and a new public vote commenced for 200 seconds. Red Bricks Foundation was eliminated as the act with the fewest public votes.

==== Week 3 (8 November) ====
- Celebrity performers: Fedez ("Prima di ogni cosa") and Sofi Tukker ("Batshit")

Contestants' performances on the third live show
Part 1
Act	Order	Song	Result
Naomi Riveccio	1	"Think"	Safe
BowLand	2	"Senza un perché"	Safe
Luna Melis	3	"Blue Jeans"	Safe
Emanuele Bertelli	4	"Congratulations"	Bottom two
Sherol dos Santos	5	"La voce del silenzio"	Safe
Part 2
Act	Order	Song	Result
Leo Gassmann	6	"Hold Back the River"	Safe
Seveso Casino Palace	7	"Take On Me"	Bottom two
Renza Castelli	8	"Mi sono innamorato di te"	Safe
Martina Attili	9	"Material Girl"	Safe
Anastasio	10	"Mio fratello è figlio unico"	Safe
Final showdown details
Act	Order	Song	Result
Emanuele Bertelli	11	"Location"	Eliminated
Seveso Casino Palace	12	"Ricchi x sempre"	Safe

Judges' votes to eliminate

- Agnelli: Emanuele Bertelli – gave no reason.
- Guenzi: Emanuele Bertelli – backed his own act, Seveso Casino Palace.
- Fedez: Seveso Casino Palace – gave no reason.
- Maionchi: Seveso Casino Palace – backed her own act, Emanuele Bertelli.

With the acts in the sing-off receiving two votes each, the result went to deadlock and a new public vote commenced for 200 seconds. Emanuele Bertelli was eliminated as the act with the fewest public votes.

==== Week 4 (15 November) ====
- Celebrity performers: Carl Brave feat. Max Gazzè ("Posso") and Gianna Nannini feat. Enrico Nigiotti ("Complici")

Contestants' performances on the fourth live show
Part 1
Act	Order	Song	Result
Seveso Casino Palace	1	"Standing in the Way of Control"	Bottom three
Renza Castelli	2	"La costruzione di un amore"	Safe
Martina Attili	3	"Strange Birds"	Safe
Part 2
Act	Order	Song	Result
Naomi Rivieccio	4	"Crisi metropolitana"	Bottom three
Leo Gassmann	5	"Pianeti"	Safe
Sherol dos Santos	6	"I Will Always Love You"	Safe
Part 3
Act	Order	Song	Result
Anastasio	7	"Another Brick in the Wall Pt.2"	Safe
Luna Melis	8	"Eppur mi son scordato di te"	Bottom three
BowLand	9	"Drop the Game"	Safe
Final showdown details
Act	Order	Song	Result
Seveso Casino Palace	10	"Vengo dalla Luna"	Eliminated
Naomi Rivieccio	11	"Nobody's Perfect"	Safe
Luna Melis	12	"Black Widow"	Saved

Judges' votes to eliminate

- Fedez: Seveso Casino Palace – backed his own act, Naomi Rivieccio.
- Guenzi: Naomi Rivieccio – backed his own act, Seveso Casino Palace.
- Maionchi: Seveso Casino Palace – gave no reason.
- Agnelli: Naomi Rivieccio – could not decide so chose to take it to deadlock.

With the acts in the sing-off receiving two votes each, the result went to deadlock and a new public vote commenced for 200 seconds. Seveso Casino Palace was eliminated as the act with the fewest public votes.

==== Week 5 (22 November) ====
- Celebrity performers: Subsonica ("Discolabirinto"/"Incantevole"/"Tutti i miei sbagli" and "Respirare") and Hooverphonic ("Romantic")

Contestants' performances on the fifth live show
Part 1
Act	Order	Song	Result
Luna Melis	1	"Los Angeles"	Safe
Renza Castelli	2	"Cielo inglese"	Bottom two
Anastasio	3	"La fine del mondo"	Safe
Sherol dos Santos	4	"Non ti avevo ma ti ho perso"	Safe
Part 2
Act	Order	Song	Result
Naomi Rivieccio	5	"Like the Rain (Unpredictable)"	Bottom two
BowLand	6	"Don't Stop Me"	Safe
Leo Gassmann	7	"Piume"	Safe
Martina Attili	8	"Cherofobia"	Safe
Final showdown details
Act	Order	Song	Result
Renza Castelli	9	"Waiting in Vain"	Eliminated
Naomi Rivieccio	10	"Bang Bang"	Safe

Judge's vote to eliminate

- Agnelli: Naomi Rivieccio – gave no reason.
- Guenzi: Renza Castelli – gave no reason.
- Fedez: Renza Castelli – gave no reason.
- Maionchi: Naomi Rivieccio – could not decide so chose to take it to deadlock.

With the acts in the sing-off receiving two votes each, the result was deadlocked and a new public vote commenced for 200 seconds. Renza Castelli was eliminated as the act with the fewest public votes.

==== Week 6: Quarter-final (29 November) ====
Contestants' performances on the sixth live show
Act	Order	First song	Order	Second song	Result
BowLand	1	"Seven Nation Army"	10	"Don't Stop Me"	Safe
Leo Gassmann	2	"Terra degli uomini"	9	"Piume"	Bottom two
Martina Attili	3	"Hyperballad"	8	"Cherofobia"	Safe
Naomi Rivieccio	4	"Look at Me Now"	11	"Like the Rain (Unpredictable)"	Safe
Luna Melis	5	"The Monster"	14	"Los Angeles"	Safe
Anastasio	6	"Stairway to Heaven"	13	"La fine del mondo"	Safe
Sherol Dos Santos	7	"Turning Tables"	12	"Non ti avevo ma ti ho perso"	Bottom two
Final showdown details
Act	Order	Song			Result
Leo Gassmann	15	"Yellow"			Saved
Sherol dos Santos	16	"And I Am Telling You I'm Not Going"			Eliminated

Judges' votes to eliminate

- Maionchi: Sherol dos Santos – backed her own act, Leo Gassmann.
- Agnelli: Leo Gassmann – backed his own act, Sherol dos Santos.
- Fedez: Sherol dos Santos – gave no reason.
- Guenzi: Leo Gassmann – could not decide so chose to take it to deadlock.

With the acts in the sing-off receiving two votes each, the result was deadlocked and a new public vote commenced for 200 seconds. Sherol dos Santos was eliminated as the act with the fewest public votes.

==== Week 7: Semi-final (6 December) ====
Contestants' performances on the seventh live show
Act	Order	First song	Order	Second song	Result
Naomi Rivieccio	1	"Problem"	10	"Rap God"/"Beautiful"	Safe
Leo Gassmann	2	"Dead in the Water"	11	"Com'è profondo il mare"	Bottom two
Luna Melis	3	"Mica Van Gogh"	7	"Can't Hold Us"	Bottom two
BowLand	4	"Iron"	8	"Amandoti"	Safe
Martina Attili	5	"The Climb"	N/A	N/A (Already Eliminated)	Eliminated
Anastasio	6	"La porta dello spavento supremo"	9	"Clint Eastwood"	Safe
Final showdown details
Act	Order	Song			Result
Leo Gassmann	12	"Caledonia"			Eliminated
Luna Melis	13	"God Is a Woman"/"I Do"			Saved

Judges' votes to eliminate

- Maionchi: Luna Melis – backed her own act, Leo Gassman.
- Agnelli: Leo Gassmann – backed his own act, Luna Melis.
- Fedez: Leo Gasmann – gave no reason
- Guenzi: Luna Melis – could not decide so chose to take it to deadlock.

With the acts in the sing-off receiving two votes each, the result was deadlocked and a new public vote commenced for 200 seconds. Leo Gassmann was eliminated as the act with the fewest public votes.

==== Week 8: Final (13 December) ====
Celebrity guest artists: Marco Mengoni, Thegiornalisti, Muse, Ghali, Tom Walker

Contestants' performances on the final live show
Round 1
Act	Order	Song	Result
Luna Melis	1	"Ti ho voluto bene veramente" with Marco Mengoni	Safe
Anastasio	2	"Guerriero" with Marco Mengoni	Safe
BowLand	3	"Io ti aspetto" with Marco Mengoni	4th Place
Naomi Rivieccio	4	"L'Essenziale" with Marco Mengoni	Safe
Round 2
Act	Order	Song	Result
Anastasio	5	"Se piovesse il tuo nome" / "Generale" / "Another Brick In The Wall pt. II"	Safe
Luna Melis	6	"God Is a Woman" & "I Do" / "Blue Jeans" / "Mica Van Gogh"	3rd Place
Naomi Rivieccio	7	"Bang Bang" / "Look at Me Now" / "Never Enough"	Safe
Round 3
Act	Order	Song	Result
Anastasio	8	"La fine del mondo"	Winner
Naomi Rivieccio	9	"Like The Rain (Unpredictable)"	Runner-up
