= Piccola anima =

Single by Ermal Meta featuring Elisa

from the album Vietato morire
- Released: 10 November 2017
- Genre: Pop soul
- Length: 3:42
- Label: Mescal
- Songwriter: Ermal Meta
- Producers: Ermal Meta; Roberto Cardelli

Ermal Meta featuring Elisa singles chronology
"Voodoo Love" (2017)	"Piccola anima" (2017)	"Non mi avete fatto niente" (2018)

Elisa singles chronology
"Ogni istante" (2017)	"Piccola anima" (2017)	"Da sola/In the Night" (2018)

Music video
- "Piccola anima" on YouTube

"Piccola anima" is a song by Italian singer Ermal Meta featuring Elisa. It was released on 10 November 2017 through Mescal Records, as the third single from Meta second studio album Vietato morire.

== Composition ==
The song, written and composed by Ermal Meta himself, featuring the vocals of singer Elisa. Meta shared his decision to collaborate with the singer during the press conference at the Sanremo Music Festival:

"I've been a huge fan of Elisa since her album Pipes & Flowers. In 2016 I was lucky enough to open some of her concerts for her album On. I proposed her to collaborate and I played her this song: Elisa loved it and agreed to sing it with me. This makes me proud and proud."

Elisa also spoke about the collaboration, declaring: "thanks to you Ermal Meta, who was able to tell the voice of a woman's heart. A woman who unfortunately many times has lived and lives in all of us. And then long live all men with a capital "m". Those who use their strength to do good. Those like you."

== Critics reception ==
Fabio Fiume of All Music Italia described the song as "a ballad" in which the two artists "play between vocals and together sing and reinforce a concept that we should all make our own, namely that "nothing is more fragile than a promise and I won't even make you one" perhaps we would avoid giving others disappointments, even unintentional ones". Mattia Marzi of Rockol observed that musically it presents "acoustic and sparse sounds" set to a "ternary rhythm", giving an overall "emotional" duet.

== Music video ==
The music video for the song was released on November 10, 2017, through Ermal Meta's YouTube channel. I was filmed in Priverno, Italy.

== Charts ==
Chart (2018)	Peak position
Italy (FIMI)	54
Italy (Airplay)	31

== Certifications ==
Region	Certification	Certified units/sales
Italy (FIMI)	Platinum	50,000^{‡}
^{‡} Sales+streaming figures based on certification alone.
