= Sanremo Music Festival 2018 =

Italian song contest (68th edition)

Dates and venue
- Semi-final 1: 6 February 2018
- Semi-final 2: 7 February 2018
- Semi-final 3: 8 February 2018
- Semi-final 4: 9 February 2018
- Final: 10 February 2018
- Venue: Teatro Ariston; Sanremo, Italy

Production
- Broadcaster: Radiotelevisione italiana (RAI)
- Director: Duccio Forzano
- Musical director: Geoff Westley
- Artistic director: Claudio Baglioni
- Presenters: Claudio Baglioni and Michelle Hunziker, Pierfrancesco Favino

Big Artists section
- Number of entries: 20
- Winner: "Non mi avete fatto niente" Ermal Meta and Fabrizio Moro

Newcomers' section
- Number of entries: 8
- Winner: "Il ballo delle incertezze" Ultimo

The Sanremo Music Festival 2018 (Italian: Festival di Sanremo 2018), officially the 68th Italian Song Festival (68º Festival della canzone italiana), was the 68th annual Sanremo Music Festival, a television song contest held in the Teatro Ariston of Sanremo and organised and broadcast by Radiotelevisione italiana (RAI). The show was presented by Claudio Baglioni, who also served as the artistic director, with Michelle Hunziker and Pierfrancesco Favino.

The competition was divided in two sections. The winners of the Big Artists section were Ermal Meta and Fabrizio Moro with "Non mi avete fatto niente", who thus earned the right to represent Italy in the Eurovision Song Contest 2018. The Newcomers' sections was won by Ultimo with the song "Il ballo delle incertezze".

== Format ==
=== Presenters ===
Sanremo Music Festival 2018 presenters

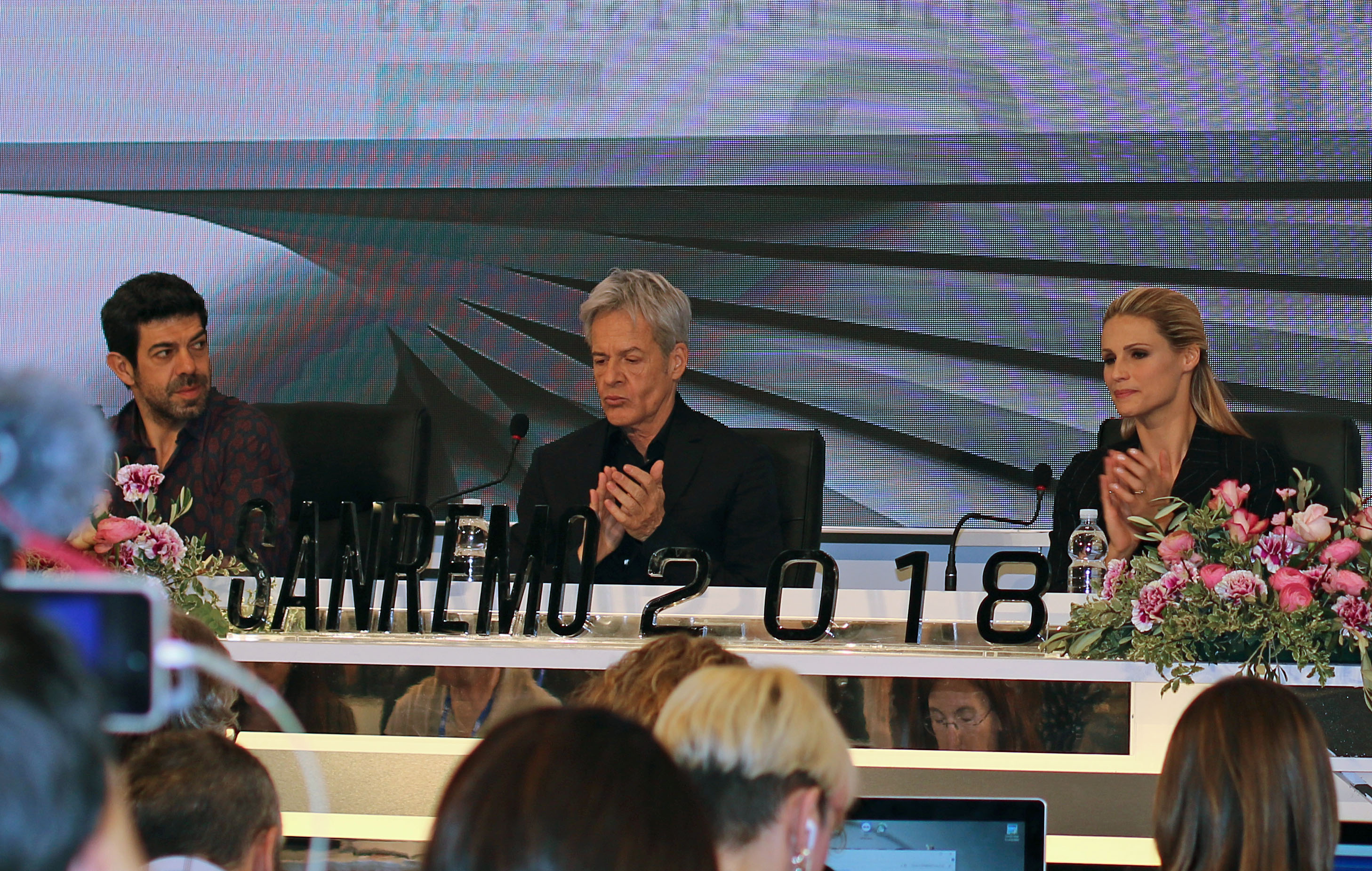
Pierfrancesco Favino, Claudio Baglioni and Michelle Hunziker

Singer-songwriter and musician, Claudio Baglioni, was the main host and artistic director of Sanremo Music Festival 2018, alongside co-hosts Michelle Hunziker and Pierfrancesco Favino.

=== Voting ===
Voting during the five evenings occurred through different combinations of four methods:

- Public televoting, carried out via landline, mobile phone, the contest's official mobile app, and online voting.
- Press jury voting, expressed by accredited journalists that followed the competition from the Roof Hall at the Teatro Ariston.
- A demoscopic poll, composed of a sample of 300 music fans, which voted from their homes via an electronic voting system managed by Ipsos.
- Expert jury voting, resulting from points assigned by personalities from the world of music, entertainment and culture. The jury is composed by Pino Donaggio (president), Giovanni Allevi, Serena Autieri, Milly Carlucci, Gabriele Muccino, Rocco Papaleo, Mirca Rosciani and Andrea Scanzi.

The three voting systems had a percentage weight so distributed:

- First, Second and Third Evening: 40% Public televoting; 30% Demoscopic poll; 30% Press jury voting
- Fourth and Fifth Evening: 50% Public televoting; 30% Press jury voting; 20% Expert jury voting

In the final part of the fifth evening, a new rank indicating the first three acts -determined by the percentage of votes obtained in this evening's vote and those obtained in previous evenings- was drawn up.

== Selections ==
=== Newcomers' section ===
The artists competing in the Newcomers' section were selected through two separate contests: Sanremo Giovani and Area Sanremo.

==== Sanremo Giovani ====
On October 31, 2017, Rai Commission for Sanremo Music Festival 2018 announced a list of 650 acts, but only 68 artists coming from all Italian regions – excluding Basilicata and Valle d'Aosta – and from abroad were selected in the first phase.

On November 10, 2017, Rai Commission announced the sixteen finalists.

Group 1

- Santiago – "Nessuno" (eliminated)
- Lorenzo Baglioni – "Il congiuntivo"
- Nyvinne – "Spreco personale" (Luxembourg)
- Dave Monaco – "L'eternità è di chi sa volare" (eliminated)

Group 2

- Mirkoeilcane – "Stiamo tutti bene"
- Luchi – "Gli amori della mente" (eliminated)
- Eva – "Cosa ti salverà"
- Iosonoaria – "Un cerchio" (eliminated)

Group 3

- Giulia Casieri – "Come stai"
- Davide Petrella – "Non può far male" (eliminated)
- Jose Nunes – "Parlami ancora" (Portugal) (eliminated)
- Antonia Laganà – "Parli"

Group 4

- Mudimbi – "Il mago"
- Carol Beria – "Nessuna lacrima" (eliminated)
- Ultimo – "Il ballo delle incertezze"
- Aprile & Mangiaracina – "Quell'attimo di eternità" (eliminated)

On December 15, 2017, the sixteen finalists performed their songs at Villa Ormond in Sanremo, with the show Sarà Sanremo broadcast on Rai 1 presented by Claudia Gerini and Federico Russo. The six selected by the jury were added to the two entries of Area Sanremo, for a total of eight young emerging artists in the category of the Newcomers' section of the Sanremo Music Festival 2018. Lorenzo Baglioni, Mudimbi, Eva, Mirkoeilcane, Giulia Casieri and Ultimo were chosen as contestants of the Newcomers' section of the Sanremo Music Festival 2018.

==== Area Sanremo ====
After the auditions, RAI Commission -composed by Massimo Cotto, Stefano Senardi, Antonio Vandoni, Maurizio Caridi and Maurilio Giordana; plus the participation of Franco Zanetti and Amara- identified 8 finalists for the competition among the 145 acts:

- Martina Attili
- Alice Caioli
- Diego Esposito
- Manuel Foresta
- Andrea Maestrelli
- Leonardo Monteiro
- Giorgia Pino
- Daniele Ronda

==== Newcomers' Finalists ====
- Lorenzo Baglioni - "Il congiuntivo"
- Mirkoeilcane - "Stiamo tutti bene"
- Eva - "Cosa ti salverà"
- Giulia Casieri - "Come stai"
- Mudimbi - "Il mago"
- Ultimo - "Il ballo delle incertezze"
- Leonardo Monteiro - "Bianca"
- Alice Caioli - "Specchi rotti"

=== Big Artists section ===
The Big Artists section of the contest will revert to 20 artists, after briefly going up to 22 last year. Unlike in previous years, there will be no eliminations during the four weeknight shows. All the artists will perform several times and will be scored during the week, but they will all advance to the final night.

== Competing entries ==
Competing songs and artists, showing writers, orchestra conductor and results achieved
Big Artists section
Song	Artist(s)	Songwriter(s)	Orchestra conductor	Rank	Sanremo Music Festival Awards
"Non mi avete fatto niente"	Ermal Meta & Fabrizio Moro	Ermal Meta; Fabrizio Moro; Andrea Febo	Diego Calvetti	1	Winner of the "Big Artists" section – Golden Lion; TimMusic Award for Most-Streamed Song on the Final's Day
"Una vita in vacanza"	Lo Stato Sociale	Alberto Cazzola; Francesco Draicchio; Lodovico Guenzi; Alberto Guidetti; Enrico Roberto; Matteo Romagnoli	Fabio Gargiulio	2	Press, Radio, TV & Web Award "Lucio Dalla"
"Il mondo prima di te"	Annalisa	Annalisa Scarrone; Davide Simonetta; Alessandro Raina	Pino Perris	3	
"Almeno pensami"	Ron	Lucio Dalla	Peppe Vessicchio	4	Critics' Award "Mia Martini"
"Imparare ad amarsi"	Ornella Vanoni feat. Bungaro & Pacifico	Bungaro; Pacifico; Cesare Chiodo; Antonio Fresa	Antonio Fresa	5	"Sergio Endrigo" Award for Best Interpretation
"La leggenda di Cristalda e Pizzomunno"	Max Gazzè	Francesco Gazzè; Massimiliano Gazzè; Francesco De Benedettis	Clemente Ferrari	6	"Giancarlo Bigazzi" Award for Best Arrangement
"Passame er sale"	Luca Barbarossa	Luca Barbarossa	Clemente Ferrari	7	Lunezia Award for Best Music-letterary Value
"Adesso"	Diodato & Roy Paci	Antonio Diodato	Vincenzo Presta	8	
"Frida (mai, mai, mai)"	The Kolors	Davide Petrella; Dario Faini; Alessandro Raina; Stash	Luca Chiaravalli	9	
"Eterno"	Giovanni Caccamo	Giovanni Caccamo; Cheope	Stefano Nanni	10	
"Così sbagliato"	Le Vibrazioni	Francesco Sarcina; Andrea Bonomo; Luca Chiaravalli; Davide Simonetta	Luca Chiaravalli	11	
"Il coraggio di ogni giorno"	Enzo Avitabile feat. Peppe Servillo	Vincenzo Avitabile; Pacifico	Roberto Rossi	12	
"Custodire"	Renzo Rubino	Renzo Rubino	Marcello Faneschi; Paolo Palazzo	13	
"Non smettere mai di cercarmi"	Noemi	Massimiliano Pelan; Noemi; Diego Calvetti; Fabio De Martino	Diego Calvetti	14	
"Ognuno ha il suo racconto"	Red Canzian	Michele Porru; Red Canzian	Fabio Gurian	15	
"Lettera dal Duca"	Decibel	Enrico Ruggeri; Fulvio Muzio; Silvio Capeccia	Roberto Rossi	16	
"Senza appartenere"	Nina Zilli	Giordana Angi; Antonio Iammarino; Nina Zilli	Valeriano Chiaravalle	17	
"Il segreto del tempo"	Roby Facchinetti & Riccardo Fogli	Pacifico; Roby Facchinetti	Danilo Ballo	18	
"Rivederti"	Mario Biondi	Mario Biondi; Giuseppe Furnari; Fisicaro	Peppe Vessicchio	19	
"Arrivedorci"	Elio e le Storie Tese	Stefano Belisari; Sergio Conforti; Davide Civaschi; Nicola Fasani	Peppe Vessicchio	20	
Newcomers' section
Song	Artist(s)	Songwriter(s)	Orchestra conductor	Rank	Sanremo Music Festival Awards
"Il ballo delle incertezze"	Ultimo	Ultimo	Diego Calvetti	1	Winner of the Newcomers' section – Silver Lion; Lunezia Award for Best Music-letterary Value
"Stiamo tutti bene"	Mirkoeilcane	Mirkoeilcane	Fio Zanotti	2	Critics' Award "Mia Martini"; "Enzo Jannacci" Award for Best Performance
"Il mago"	Mudimbi	Michel Mudimbi; Andrea Bonomo; Marco Zangirolami; Alessandro Adolfo Bavo; Federico Vaccari; Pietro Miano	Umberto Iervolino	3	Assomusica Award for Best Stage Presence
"Il congiuntivo"	Lorenzo Baglioni	Lorenzo Baglioni; Michele Baglioni; Lorenzo Piscopo	Diego Calvetti	4	
"Specchi rotti"	Alice Caioli	Alice Caioli; Paolo Muscolino	Massimo Morini	5	Press, Radio, TV & Web Award "Lucio Dalla"
"Cosa ti salverà"	Eva	Antonio Di Martino; Antonio Filippelli	Clemente Ferrari	6	
"Come stai"	Giulia Casieri	Giulia Casieri; Alfredo Ravasio	Massimo Morini	7	
"Bianca"	Leonardo Monteiro	Marco Ciappelli; Vladi Tosetto	Dariana Koumanova	8	

== Shows ==
=== First evening ===
The 20 Big Artists each performed their song for the first time.

R/O	Artist	Song	Votes				Place
R/O	Artist	Song	Public (weight 40%)	Demoscopic Jury (weight 30%)	Press Jury (weight 30%)	Average	Place
1	Annalisa	"Il mondo prima di te"	11th (3.83%)	3rd	9th	4.66%	3rd
2	Ron	"Almeno pensami"	4th (6.58%)	6th	6th	6.27%	4th
3	The Kolors	"Frida (mai, mai, mai)"	2nd (10.60%)	9th	10th	6.54%	8th
4	Max Gazzè	"La leggenda di Cristalda e Pizzomunno"	6th (4.61%)	5th	5th	6.26%	6th
5	Ornella Vanoni feat. Bungaro & Pacifico	"Imparare ad amarsi"	7th (4.39%)	8th	4th	6.26%	5th
6	Ermal Meta & Fabrizio Moro	"Non mi avete fatto niente"	1st (21.98%)	1st	2nd	16.12%	1st
7	Mario Biondi	"Rivederti"	13th (3.45%)	11th	17th	3.19%	15th
8	Roby Facchinetti & Riccardo Fogli	"Il segreto del tempo"	3rd (6.77%)	18th	19th	3.81%	11th
9	Lo Stato Sociale	"Una vita in vacanza"	8th (4.27%)	2nd	1st	9.53%	2nd
10	Noemi	"Non smettere mai di cercarmi"	14th (3.09%)	4th	16th	3.86%	10th
11	Decibel	"Fuori dal tempo"	15th (2.81%)	15th	10th	3.10%	16th
12	Elio e le Storie Tese	"Arrivedorci"	20th (1.72%)	12th	18th	2.41%	20th
13	Giovanni Caccamo	"Eterno"	10th (3.97%)	13th	12th	3.71%	12th
14	Red Canzian	"Ognuno ha il suo racconto"	12th (3.53%)	20th	13th	2.83%	17th
15	Luca Barbarossa	"Passame er sale"	5th (4.93%)	10th	15th	3.91%	9th
16	Diodato & Roy Paci	"Adesso"	17th (2.60%)	16th	3rd	5.08%	7th
17	Nina Zilli	"Senza appartenere"	19th (1.83%)	7th	19th	2.61%	18th
18	Renzo Rubino	"Custodire"	16th (2.78%)	19th	13th	2.56%	19th
19	Enzo Avitabile feat. Peppe Servillo	"Il coraggio di ogni giorno"	9th (4.16%)	17th	8th	3.67%	13th
20	Le Vibrazioni	"Così sbagliato"	18th (2.10%)	14th	7th	3.61%	14th

=== Second evening ===
The first ten Big Artists each performed their song again and the first four Newcomers each performed their song for the first time.

==== Big Artists ====
R/O	Artist	Song	Votes				Place
R/O	Artist	Song	Public (weight 40%)	Demoscopic Jury (weight 30%)	Press Jury (weight 30%)	Average	Place
1	Le Vibrazioni	"Così sbagliato"	8th (7.71%)	6th	5th	8.44%	6th
2	Nina Zilli	"Senza appartenere"	7th (8.88%)	2nd	8th	8.95%	5th
3	Diodato & Roy Paci	"Adesso"	5th (9.32%)	5th	1st	13.26%	4th
4	Elio e le Storie Tese	"Arrivedorci"	10th (3.66%)	8th	10th	4.30%	10th
5	Ornella Vanoni feat. Bungaro & Pacifico	"Imparare ad amarsi"	3rd (12.35%)	4th	2nd	13.94%	2nd
6	Red Canzian	"Ognuno ha il suo racconto"	4th (9.59%)	10th	8th	6.49%	9th
7	Ron	"Almeno pensami"	2nd (14.96%)	3rd	3rd	13.87%	3rd
8	Renzo Rubino	"Custodire"	6th (9.09%)	9th	7th	7.29%	8th
9	Annalisa	"Il mondo prima di te"	1st (17.54%)	1st	3rd	16.10%	1st
10	Decibel	"Lettera del Duca"	9th (6.90%)	7th	6th	7.36%	7th

==== Newcomers ====
R/O	Artist	Song	Votes				Place
R/O	Artist	Song	Public (weight 40%)	Demoscopic Jury (weight 30%)	Press Jury (weight 30%)	Average	Place
1	Lorenzo Baglioni	"Il congiuntivo"	1st (49.91%)	2nd	2nd	35.32%	1st
2	Giulia Casieri	"Come stai"	4th (8.17%)	3rd	3rd	17.18%	4th
3	Mirkoeilcane	"Stiamo tutti bene"	2nd (25.18%)	4th	1st	28.87%	2nd
4	Alice Caioli	"Specchi rotti"	3rd (16.74%)	1st	4th	18.63%	3rd

=== Third evening ===
The other ten Big Artists each performed their song for the second time and the other four Newcomers each performed their song for the first time.

==== Big Artists ====
R/O	Artist	Song	Votes				Place
R/O	Artist	Song	Public (weight 40%)	Demoscopic Jury (weight 30%)	Press Jury (weight 30%)	Average	Place
1	Giovanni Caccamo	"Eterno"	8th (4.86%)	7th	7th	6.31%	8th
2	Lo Stato Sociale	"Una vita in vacanza"	4th (7.94%)	1st	1st	15.63%	2nd
3	Luca Barbarossa	"Passame er sale"	2nd (12.43%)	5th	6th	10.21%	4th
4	Enzo Avitabile feat. Peppe Servillo	"Il coraggio di ogni giorno"	6th (6.86%)	9th	5th	7.00%	7th
5	Max Gazzè	"La leggenda di Cristalda e Pizzomunno"	5th (7.34%)	4th	2nd	12.08%	3rd
6	Roby Facchinetti & Riccardo Fogli	"Il segreto del tempo"	7th (5.49%)	10th	10th	3.28%	10th
7	Ermal Meta & Fabrizio Moro	"Non mi avete fatto niente"	1st (41.18%)	2nd	3rd	25.38%	1st
8	Noemi	"Non smettere mai di cercarmi"	9th (2.98%)	3rd	8th	7.34%	6th
9	The Kolors	"Frida (mai, mai, mai)"	3rd (8.71%)	6th	4th	9.12%	5th
10	Mario Biondi	"Rivederti"	10th (2.21%)	8th	9th	3.65%	9th

==== Newcomers ====
R/O	Artist	Song	Votes				Place
R/O	Artist	Song	Public (weight 40%)	Demoscopic Jury (weight 30%)	Press Jury (weight 30%)	Total	Place
1	Mudimbi	"Il mago"	2nd (32.69%)	1st	2nd	31.77%	2nd
2	Eva	"Cosa ti salverà"	3rd (11.40%)	2nd	3rd	18.75%	3rd
3	Ultimo	"Il ballo delle incertezze"	1st (48.18%)	2nd	1st	38.42%	1st
4	Leonardo Monteiro	"Bianca"	4th (7.73%)	4th	4th	11.06%	4th

=== Fourth evening ===
The 20 Big Artists performed their songs as duets and the eight Newcomers also performed their songs again.

R/O	Artist	Guest	Song	Votes				Place
R/O	Artist	Guest	Song	Public (weight 50%)	Expert Jury (weight 20%)	Press Jury (weight 30%)	Average	Place
1	Renzo Rubino	Serena Rossi	"Custodire"	7th (4.74%)	15th	8th	3.52%	10th
2	Le Vibrazioni	Skin	"Così sbagliato"	15th (2.41%)	12th	10th	3.44%	13th
3	Noemi	Paola Turci	"Non smettere mai di cercarmi"	12th (2.90%)	20th	15th	2.91%	14th
4	Mario Biondi	Ana Carolina & Daniel Jobim	"Rivederti"	18th (1.62%)	15th	20th	1.72%	19th
5	Annalisa Scarrone	Michele Bravi	"Il mondo prima di te"	2nd (11.59%)	9th	3rd	7.87%	3rd
6	Lo Stato Sociale	Piccolo Coro dell'Antoniano & Paolo Rossi	"Una vita in vacanza"	3rd (8.77%)	11th	1st	9.01%	2nd
7	Max Gazzè	Rita Marcotulli & Roberto Gatto	"La leggenda di Cristalda e Pizzomunno"	5th (5.86%)	5th	7th	6.32%	7th
8	Decibel	Midge Ure	"Lettera dal Duca"	14th (2.70%)	15th	16th	2.70%	15th
9	Ornella Vanoni feat. Bungaro & Pacifico	Alessandro Preziosi	"Imparare ad amarsi"	8th (4.12%)	3rd	6th	6.61%	5th
10	Diodato & Roy Paci	Ghemon	"Adesso"	13th (2.74%)	5th	2nd	6.44%	6th
11	Roby Facchinetti & Riccardo Fogli	Giusy Ferreri	"Il segreto del tempo"	11th (3.01%)	15th	19th	2.24%	18th
12	Enzo Avitabile & Peppe Servillo	Avion Travel & Daby Touré	"Il coraggio di ogni giorno"	10th (3.50%)	10th	13th	3.46%	12th
13	Ermal Meta & Fabrizio Moro	Simone Cristicchi	"Non mi avete fatto niente"	1st (23.71%)	2nd	4th	15.71%	1st
14	Giovanni Caccamo	Arisa	"Eterno"	16th (2.40%)	7th	12th	3.49%	11th
15	Ron	Alice	"Almeno pensami"	9th (3.58%)	1st	5th	7.00%	4th
16	Red Canzian	Marco Masini	"Ognuno ha il suo racconto"	17th (2.22%)	13th	14th	2.53%	16th
17	The Kolors	Tullio De Piscopo & Enrico Nigiotti	"Frida"	4th (6.62%)	8th	8th	5.65%	8th
18	Luca Barbarossa	Anna Foglietta	"Passame er sale"	6th (5.68%)	3rd	11th	5.46%	9th
19	Nina Zilli	Sergio Cammariere	"Senza appartenere"	19th (1.24%)	14th	17th	2.39%	17th
20	Elio e le storie tese	Neri per Caso	"Arrivedorci"	20th (0.59%)	15th	17th	1.53%	20th

=== Fifth evening ===
The 20 Big Artists will again each perform their entry for a final time. The top three will face a superfinal vote, then the winner of Sanremo 2018 will be decided.

Advanced to second round

R/O	Artist	Song	Votes				Place
R/O	Artist	Song	Public (weight 50%)	Expert Jury (weight 20%)	Press Jury (weight 30%)	Average	Place
1	Luca Barbarossa	"Passame er sale"	4th (9.95%)	3rd	11th	6.83%	7th
2	Red Canzian	"Ognuno ha il suo racconto"	13th (2.07%)	13th	16th	2.06%	15th
3	The Kolors	"Frida"	5th (8.50%)	10th	8th	5.99%	9th
4	Elio e le Storie Tese	"Arrivedorci"	19th (1.03%)	16th	19th	1.14%	20th
5	Ron	"Almeno pensami"	7th (4.75%)	1st	7th	7.13%	4th
6	Max Gazzè	"La leggenda di Cristalda e Pizzomunno"	6th (6.12%)	5th	4th	6.93%	6th
7	Annalisa	"Il mondo prima di te"	3rd (10.02%)	6th	6th	8.31%	3rd
8	Renzo Rubino	"Custodire"	11th (2.38%)	17th	12th	2.69%	13th
9	Decibel	"Lettera dal Duca"	15th (1.74%)	17th	15th	1.99%	16th
10	Ornella Vanoni feat. Bungaro & Pacifico	"Imparare ad amarsi"	8th (4.08%)	2nd	4th	7.07%	5th
11	Giovanni Caccamo	"Eterno"	10th (2.48%)	11th	13th	2.99%	10th
12	Lo Stato Sociale	"Una vita in vacanza"	2nd (10.15%)	8th	1st	10.50%	2nd
13	Roby Facchinetti & Riccardo Fogli	"Il segreto del tempo"	12th (2.08%)	17th	19th	1.70%	18th
14	Diodato & Roy Paci	"Adesso"	9th (2.80%)	6th	2nd	6.78%	8th
15	Nina Zilli	"Senza appartenere"	18th (1.40%)	11th	17th	1.94%	17th
16	Noemi	"Non smettere mai di cercarmi"	16th (1.60%)	17th	14th	2.09%	14th
17	Ermal Meta & Fabrizio Moro	"Non mi avete fatto niente"	1st (24.58%)	4th	3rd	16.56%	1st
18	Mario Biondi	"Rivederti"	20th (1.00%)	9th	17th	1.69%	19th
19	Le Vibrazioni	"Così sbagliato"	17th (1.52%)	13th	8th	2.82%	11th
20	Enzo Avitabile feat. Peppe Servillo	"Il coraggio di ogni giorno"	14th (1.75%)	13th	10th	2.79%	12th

==== Superfinal ====
Winner
Runner-up
Third place

R/O	Artist	Song	Votes				Place
R/O	Artist	Song	Press Jury (weight 30%)	Expert Jury (weight 20%)	Public (weight 50%)	Average	Place
1	Annalisa	"Il mondo prima di te"	3rd	1st	2nd (23,44%)	26,94%	3
2	Lo Stato Sociale	"Una vita in vacanza"	1st	3rd	3rd (22,10%)	28,40%	2
3	Ermal Meta & Fabrizio Moro	"Non mi avete fatto niente"	2nd	2nd	1st (54,41%)	44,66%	1

== Special guests ==
The special guests of Sanremo Music Festival 2018 were:

- Singers / musicians: Biagio Antonacci, Gianni Morandi, Gianna Nannini, Nek, Gino Paoli, Laura Pausini, Max Pezzali, Piero Pelù, Danilo Rea, Francesco Renga, Shaggy, Sting, James Taylor.
- Bands / music groups: Il Volo, Negramaro.
- Actors / comedians / directors / models: Stefano Accorsi, Carolina Crescentini, Elena Cucci, Nino Frassica, Rosario Fiorello, Claudia Gerini, Massimo Ghini, Sabrina Impacciatore, Ivano Marescotti, Giulia Michelini, Giampaolo Morelli, Gabriele Muccino, Stefania Sandrelli, Valeria Solarino, Gianmarco Tognazzi.
- Other notable figures: Antonella Clerici, Pippo Baudo, Franca Leosini, Giorgio Panariello.

== Related shows ==
=== Primafestival ===
Sergio Assisi and Melissa Greta Marchetto present Primafestival, a small show on air on Rai 1 immediately after TG1. The show features details, curiosities and news relating to Sanremo Music Festival 2018.

=== Dopofestival ===
Edoardo Leo and Carolina Di Domenico, with the participation of Sabrina Impacciatore, Rolando Ravello, Paolo Genovese, Rocco Tanica and a group of journalists of Italian press, presents ...tanto siamo tra amici al Dopofestival, a talk show on air on Rai 1 immediately after Sanremo Music Festival. The show features comments about the Festival as well as interviews to the singers competing in the song contest.

== Broadcast and ratings ==
=== Local broadcast ===
Rai 1 and Rai Radio 2 are the official broadcasters of the festival in Italy. The show is also available in streaming via website on Rai Play.

==== Ratings Sanremo Music Festival 2018 ====
The audience is referred to the one of Rai 1.

Live Show	Timeslot (UTC+1)	Date	1st time (9.00pm - 0.00am)		2nd time (0.00am - 1.00am)		Overall audience	
Live Show	Timeslot (UTC+1)	Date	Viewers	Share (%)	Viewers	Share (%)	Viewers	Share (%)
1st	9:00 pm	February 6	13,776,000	51.4%	6,624,000	55.4%	11,603,000	52.1%
2nd	9:00 pm	February 7	11,458,000	46.6%	5,870,000	52.9%	9,687,000	47.7%
3rd	9:00 pm	February 8	12,657,000	51.1%	6,146,000	54.4%	10,825,000	51.6%
4th	9:00 pm	February 9	12,246,000	49.1%	6,985,000	57.1%	10,108,000	51.1%
5th	9:00 pm	February 10	13,240,000	54.0%	10,404,000	69.0%	12,125,000	58.3%

==== Ratings Prima Festival 2018 ====
Episode	Timeslot (UTC+1)	Date	Viewers	Share (%)
1	8:30 pm	February 6	8,251,000	29.8%
2	8:30 pm	February 7	7,346,000	28.2%
3	8:30 pm	February 8	7,232,000	27.9%
4	8:30 pm	February 9	7,021,000	27.4%
5	8:30 pm	February 10	8,123,000	34.4%

==== Ratings Dopo Festival 2018 ====
Episode	Timeslot (UTC+1)	Date	Viewers	Share (%)
1	1:00 am	February 7	2,078,000	37.1%
2	1:00 am	February 8	1,979,000	37.3%
3	1:00 am	February 9	2,042,000	38.0%
4	1:00 am	February 10	2,400,000	41.7%
5	1:00 am	February 11	3,518,000	48.7%

=== International broadcast ===
The international television service Rai Italia broadcast the competition in the Americas, Africa, Asia and Australia. The contest will be broadcast in Albania by RTSH and Russia by Vremya. The contest is also visible via website on Eurovision.

== See also ==
- Italy in the Eurovision Song Contest 2018
