= Fabrizio Moro =

Italian singer-songwriter (born 1975)

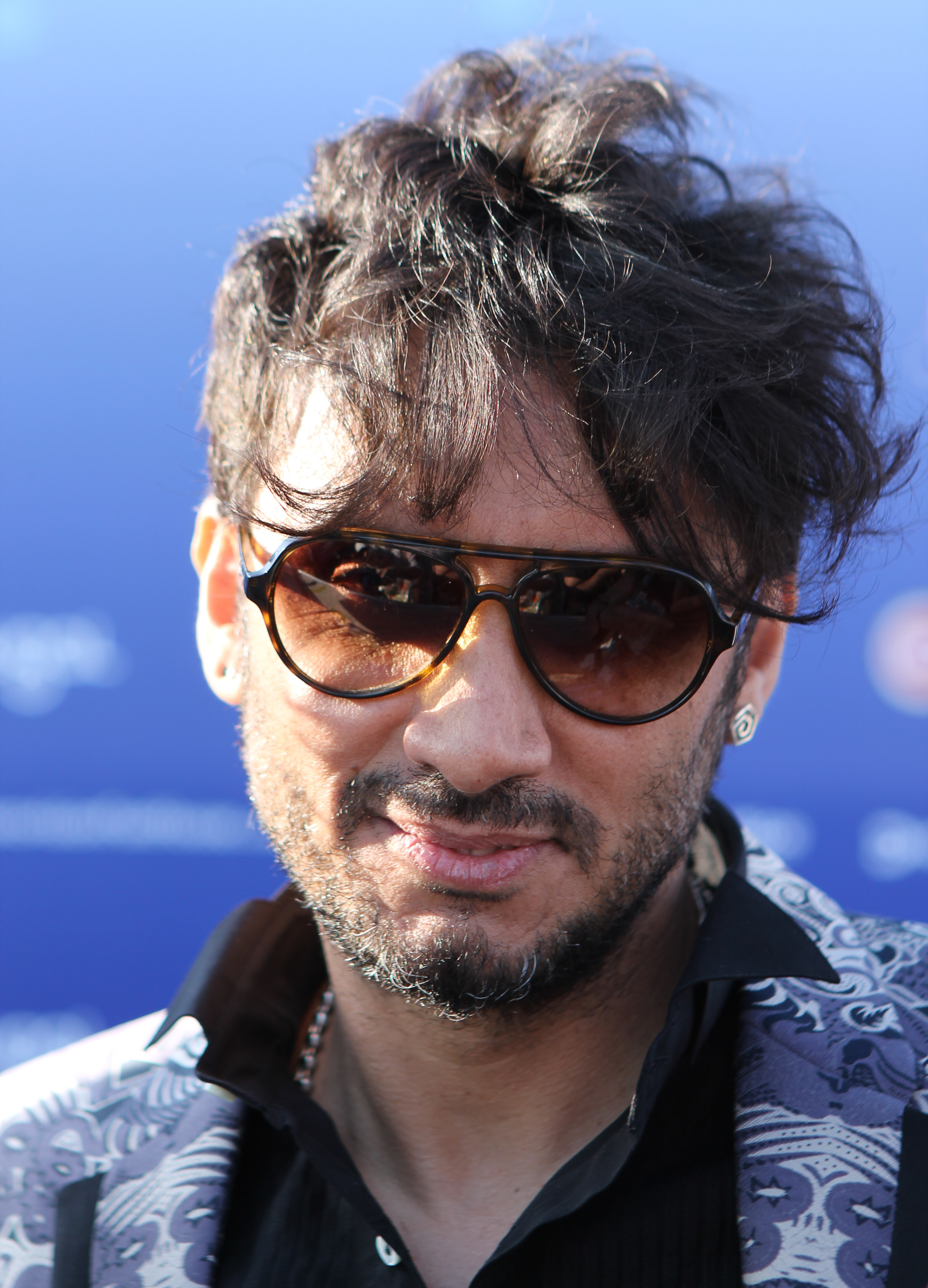
- Fabrizio Moro in 2018

Background information
- Born: Fabrizio Mobrici; 9 April 1975 (age 51); Rome, Italy
- Genres: Pop rock
- Occupations: Singer; songwriter; musician
- Instruments: Vocals; guitar
- Works: Discography
- Years active: 1996–present
- Labels: Sony Music; Warner Music Italy; La Fattoria del Moro; BMG Rights Management

Fabrizio Mobrici (born 9 April 1975), known by his stage name Fabrizio Moro (Italian pronunciation: [faˈbrittsjo ˈmɔːro]), is an Italian singer-songwriter. He released his debut album in 2000 and he achieved commercial success in 2007, after winning the Newcomers' Section of the Sanremo Music Festival with his entry "Pensa". The song became a number-one hit in Italy, while the album with the same title was certified gold by the Italian Music Industry Federation. As of 2020, he has released nine studio albums, an extended play and a live album. In 2011, Moro also presented the docu-reality Sbarre, broadcast by Rai 2. He also wrote songs for other artists, including pop rock band Stadio and pop singer Noemi. In a duet with Ermal Meta, he won the Sanremo Music Festival 2018 with the song "Non mi avete fatto niente", and represented Italy in the Eurovision Song Contest 2018 in Lisbon, reaching 5th place overall. He won also Canzonissima 2026 singing Lucio Battisti’s Il mio canto libero.

== Music career ==
Fabrizio Moro released his debut single, "Per tutta un'altra destinazione", in 1996. The single was later included in his first self-titled studio album, which was released in 2000 by Ricordi, following his participation in the Newcomers' Section of the 50th Sanremo Music Festival. Moro competed with the song "Un giorno senza fine", placing 13th in a field of 18.

In 2004 Moro recorded a Spanish-language version of the song "Situazioni della vita" for the compilation album Italianos para siempre, released in Latin America by Universal and featuring songs performed by several other Italian artists. His following singles, "Eppure pretendevi di essere chiamata amore" and "Ci vuole un business" were released in 2004 and 2005, respectively.

In 2007, Moro rose to national fame after competing for a second time in the Newcomers' Section of the Sanremo Music Festival. His entry "Pensa", a rap-influenced anti-Mafia song dedicated to Giovanni Falcone and Paolo Borsellino won the Newcomers' competition and received the "Mia Martini" Critics' Award during the 57th edition of the contest. After being released as a single, "Pensa" topped the Italian Singles Chart and entered the top 40 in Switzerland. The song was also included in the album with the same title, which was later certified gold by the Federation of the Italian Music Industry.

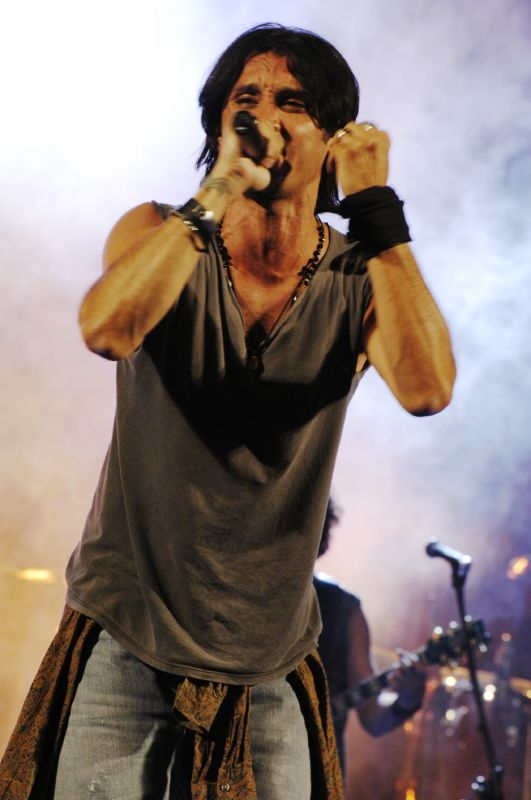
Fabrizio Moro in concert, 20 July 2007

After his third participation in the Sanremo Music Festival, the first in the section reserved to established artists, Moro released his third studio album in 2008, titled Domani. The first single from the album, "Eppure mi hai cambiato la vita", placed third in the singing competition and became a top ten hit in Italy.

In 2009 Moro contributed writing the song "Resta come sei" for the album Diluvio universale by Italian pop rock band Stadio. Moro also appears as a featured artists in the track. On 5 June 2009, he released his first Extended Play, Barabba. The title track was considered by Italian journalists as a reference to Silvio Berlusconi's scandal involving teenager Noemi Letizia. Despite this, he denied any reference to Silvio Berlusconi, claiming the song was written before the scandal was revealed. The following year, Moro competed once again in the Sanremo Music Festival, performing the song "Non è una canzone". During the semi-final, he also performed the song with Spanish band Jarabe de Palo, but he failed to qualify for the final night of the competition. The song was included in the album Ancora Barabba and peaked at number 17 on the Italian FIMI Top Digital Download.

In November 2011, Moro debuted as a TV personality, presenting the programme Sbarre, a docu-reality about Italian prisons broadcast by Rai 2. Moro also wrote and performed the programme's theme song, "Respiro", released as a single on 23 September 2011 and included in Moro's first live album, Live Atlantico.

As a songwriter, Moro also wrote the songs "Sono solo parole" and "Se non è amore", both released as singles by Noemi and included in the 2012 edition of RossoNoemi and in Rosso Live, respectively.

On 11 February 2018, Moro, along with Ermal Meta, won the Big Artists section of the Sanremo Music Festival 2018 with the song Non mi avete fatto niente, and as such, represented Italy at the Eurovision Song Contest 2018 in Lisbon, Portugal, reaching fifth place overall.

== Discography ==
- Fabrizio Moro (2000)
- Ognuno ha quel che si merita (2005)
- Pensa (2007)
- Domani (2008)
- Ancora Barabba (2010)
- L'inizio (2013)
- Via delle Girandole 10 (2015)
- Pace (2017)
- Figli di nessuno (2019)
- Non ho paura di niente (2025)

== Television ==
Year	Title	Network	Role	Notes
2011	Sbarre	Rai 2	Co-host	7 episodes

Awards and achievements
Preceded by Riccardo Maffoni with "Sole negli occhi"	Sanremo Music Festival; Winner Newcomers section 2007	Succeeded by Sonohra with "L'amore"
Preceded by Francesco Gabbani	Sanremo Music Festival winner (with Ermal Meta); 2018	Succeeded by Mahmood
Preceded by Francesco Gabbani with "Occidentali's Karma"	Italy in the Eurovision Song Contest (with Ermal Meta); 2018	Succeeded by Mahmood with "Soldi"
