= Vietato morire =

Studio album by Ermal Meta
- Released: 10 February 2017
- Genre: Pop
- Length: 68:53
- Label: Mescal

Ermal Meta chronology
| Umano (2016) | Vietato morire (2017) | Non abbiamo armi (2018) |

Singles from Vietato morire
- 1. "Vietato morire" Released: 8 February 2017; 2. "Ragazza paradiso" Released: 16 June 2017; 3. "Voodoo Love" Released: 15 September 2017; 4. "Piccola anima" Released: 10 November 2017

Vietato morire is the second studio album by Albanian-Italian singer-songwriter Ermal Meta, released in Italy on 10 February 2017 by Mescal and distributed by Artist First.

The album featured "Vietato morire", presented by the singer during the 67th Sanremo Music Festival, placing third in the main competition and receiving the Critics' Prize "Mia Martini". The album also featured the collaboration "Piccola anima" with Italian singer-songwriter Elisa.

The album peaked at number one of the Italian Albums Chart, becoming Meta first album to achieve it.

== Background and composition ==
In 2016 Ermal Meta published his debut album Umano as independent artist. On December 12, 2016 Sanremo Music Festival art director and host Carlo Conti announced the participation of the singer at the competition with the song "Vietato morire".

In January 2017, Ermal Meta announced the publication of his second studio album on February 10, 2017. The album was designed as a double disc, with one part of nine unreleased tracks and one containing tracks from Umano. The album featured two collaborations with Italian singer-songwriter Elisa and Italian musician Luca Vicini.

== Critics reception ==
Fabio Fiume of All Music Italia described Vietato morire as "a complete record" through which the artist has "a world to tell, [...] with the ability to know how to do it," while the songs "tackle pop music with mastery, keeping boredom and yawns at arm's length and armed" in which the singer's "vocal openings" surprise. Fiume particularly appreciated the song "Piccola anima" with Elisa, in which the two artists "play between vocals."

Mattia Marzi of Rockol wrote that "the songs are all related to the San Remo piece," through the tale of "life that should be preserved, not endangered." Marzi defined the tracks as "heterogeneous," divided between "acoustic and sparse sounds" and "more produced songs with more electronic sounds," which on the whole feature "clear lyrics, simple melodies, catchy refrains" that "have no important pretensions except to reach as many people as possible."

== Track listing ==
Disc one – Umano
| No. | Title | Length |
|---|---|---|
| 1. | "Odio le favole" | 3:24 |
| 2. | "Gravità con me" | 3:54 |
| 3. | "Pezzi di paradiso" | 3:28 |
| 4. | "A parte te" | 4:38 |
| 5. | "Umano" | 3:56 |
| 6. | "Volevo dirti" | 3:21 |
| 7. | "Bionda" | 3:18 |
| 8. | "Lettera a mio padre" | 3:53 |
| 9. | "Schegge" | 5:22 |

Disc two – Vietato morire
| No. | Title | Length |
|---|---|---|
| 1. | "Vietato morire" | 3:31 |
| 2. | "Ragazza paradiso" | 3:39 |
| 3. | "Piccola anima" (featuring Elisa) | 3:41 |
| 4. | "Bob Marley" | 3:00 |
| 5. | "La vita migliore" (featuring Vicio) | 3:26 |
| 6. | "New York" | 3:14 |
| 7. | "Voodoo Love" | 3:52 |
| 8. | "Rien ne va plus" | 3:03 |
| 9. | "Voce del verbo" | 6:13 |

== Commercial performance ==
After debuting at number five on the Italian FIMI Albums Chart, the album reached number one in its second week, on 24 February 2017, becoming the singer's first album to achieve such an achievement.

== Charts ==
=== Weekly charts ===
| Chart (2017) | Peak position |
|---|---|
| Italian Albums (FIMI) | 1 |

=== Year-end charts ===
| Chart (2022) | Position |
|---|---|
| Italian Albums (FIMI) | 33 |

== Certifications ==
| Region | Certification | Certified units/sales |
|---|---|---|
| Italy (FIMI) | Platinum | 50,000^{*} |
^{*} Sales figures based on certification alone.
