= Non mi avete fatto niente =

2018 single by Ermal Meta and Fabrizio Moro

Single by Ermal Meta and Fabrizio Moro

from the album Non abbiamo armi and Parole rumori e anni
- Released: 7 February 2018
- Genre: Folk-pop
- Length: 3:28
- Label: Tetoyoshi Music Italia; Sony Music
- Songwriters: Ermal Meta; Fabrizio Moro; Andrea Febo

Ermal Meta singles chronology
| "Piccola anima" (2017) | "Non mi avete fatto niente" (2018) | "Dall'alba al tramonto" (2018) |

Fabrizio Moro singles chronology
| "La felicità" (2017) | "Non mi avete fatto niente" (2018) | "L'eternità (il mio quartiere)" (2018) |

Music video
- "Non mi avete fatto niente" on YouTube

Eurovision Song Contest 2018 entry
- Country: Italy
- Artists: Ermal Meta & Fabrizio Moro
- Language: Italian
- Composers: Ermal Meta; Fabrizio Moro; Andrea Febo
- Lyricists: Ermal Meta; Fabrizio Moro; Andrea Febo

Finals performance
- Final result: 5th
- Final points: 308

Entry chronology
- ◄ "Occidentali's Karma" (2017)
- "Soldi" (2019) ►

"Non mi avete fatto niente" (English: "You haven't done anything to me") is a song performed by Italian singers Ermal Meta and Fabrizio Moro. The song was released as a digital download on 7 February 2018 as the lead single from the respective albums by each artist: Non abbiamo armi and Parole rumori e anni. It won the Sanremo Music Festival 2018 and represented Italy in the Eurovision Song Contest 2018 in Lisbon, Portugal. On 30 March 2018, the shortened version for Eurovision was released on Spotify.

In February 2019, the song received a nomination for the Voices for Freedom Award, voted by the Italian division of Amnesty International for the best song with a social message.

== Composition ==
The song was written by both singer-songwriters together with Andrea Febo. The lyrics deal with wars across the world and terrorist attacks in Europe and the Middle East: the cities of London, Paris, Nice, Cairo and Barcelona are cited in the lyrics. The song was written consequently to the Manchester Arena bombing that happened after an Ariana Grande concert in May 2017.

The chorus of the song is cited from a previous song written by Febo (third author of "Non mi avete fatto niente"), titled "Silenzio" and submitted to the Newcomers' section of the Sanremo Music Festival 2016 performed by Ambra Calvani and Gabriele De Pascali.

== Eurovision Song Contest ==
Meta and Moro were announced to be taking part in the Sanremo Music Festival 2018 with the song "Non mi avete fatto niente" on 16 December 2017. They competed during the show's first night on 6 February 2018, placing first after winning the televote and public opinion jury and placing second with the press jury. The song competed again during the third night on 8 February, and placed first yet again, receiving top marks from the televote, and placing second and third with the public opinion jury and press jury, respectively. The song later competed in the final on 10 February, and advanced to the superfinal along with the songs by Annalisa and Lo Stato Sociale. They went on to win the competition after receiving 44.66% of the overall vote. Shortly after, it was confirmed that Meta and Moro had accepted the invitation to represent Italy at the Eurovision Song Contest 2018 with the song "Non mi avete fatto niente".

As Italy is a member of the "Big Five", the song automatically advanced to the final, held on 12 May 2018 in Lisbon, Portugal. The song reached fifth place, by ending up third in the televote and 17th in the jury vote.

== Charts ==
=== Weekly charts ===
| Chart (2018) | Peak position |
|---|---|
| Belgium (Ultratip Bubbling Under Flanders) | 30 |
| Euro Digital Songs (Billboard) | 20 |
| Italy (FIMI) | 2 |
| Italy Airplay (EarOne) | 1 |
| Sweden Heatseeker (Sverigetopplistan) | 20 |
| Switzerland (Schweizer Hitparade) | 16 |

=== Year-end charts ===
| Chart (2018) | Position |
|---|---|
| Italy (FIMI) | 50 |

== Certifications ==
Certifications for "Non mi avete fatto niente"
| Region | Certification | Certified units/sales |
|---|---|---|
| Italy (FIMI) | Platinum | 50,000^{‡} |
^{‡} Sales+streaming figures based on certification alone.

== Release history ==
| Region | Date | Format | Label |
|---|---|---|---|
| Worldwide | 7 February 2018 | Digital download | Tetoyoshi Music Italia; Sony Music Entertainment |

== See also ==
- List of anti-war songs
