= Aversion to happiness =

- Other names: Fear of happiness
- Specialty: Psychology

Aversion to happiness, also called fear of happiness, refers to "the subjective experience of negative affect (e.g., fear, anxiety, guilt, or discomfort) when experiencing or expressing happiness, which stems from the belief that happiness may lead to negative consequences". It is an attitude towards happiness in which individuals may deliberately avoid experiences that invoke positive emotions or happiness. Aversion to happiness is not a recognized mental health disorder on its own, but it can contribute to and/or exacerbate existing mental health issues.

== Reasons ==
Mohsen Joshanloo and Dan Weijers identify four reasons for an aversion to happiness:

- a belief that happiness will cause bad things to happen
- that happiness will cause you to become a bad person
- that expressing happiness is somehow bad for you and others
- that pursuing happiness is bad for you and others.

== Research ==
For example, "some people—in Western and Eastern cultures—are wary of happiness because they believe that bad things, such as unhappiness, suffering, and death, tend to happen to happy people." Empirical studies show that fear of happiness is associated with fragility of happiness beliefs, suggesting that one of the causes of aversion to happiness may be the belief that happiness is unstable and fragile. Research shows that fear of happiness is associated with avoidant and anxious attachment styles. A study found that perfectionistic tendencies, loneliness, a childhood perceived as unhappy, belief in paranormal phenomena, and holding a collectivistic understanding of happiness are positively associated with aversion to happiness. A study found that high perfectionism, low self-esteem, and low meaning in life contribute to fear of happiness. A machine learning analysis of 22 potential predictors of fear of happiness showed that existential nihilism and difficulties in emotion regulation were the strongest predictors in both Turkey and the United States. These were followed by insecure attachment, both anxious and avoidant, and perfectionism. Demographic characteristics, including gender, age, and education, and ideological beliefs, including religiosity and fatalism, contributed little to predictive accuracy in either culture. Overall, the findings suggest that fear of happiness reflects broader psychological vulnerability characterized by existential distress, impaired emotion regulation, insecure relational patterns, and maladaptive perfectionism.

== Cultural factors ==
The levels of fear of happiness vary across cultures. After adjusting for measurement invariance, a 6-country study found that these cultures indeed vary in their true levels of fear of happiness. The ranking of countries from highest to lowest fear of happiness was as follows: Turkey, USA, Korea, Canada, Poland, and Portugal.

One of several reasons why fear of happiness may develop is the belief that when one becomes happy, a negative event will soon occur that will taint that happiness, as if punishing that individual for satisfaction. This belief is thought to be more prevalent in non-Western cultures. In Western cultures, such as American culture, "it is almost taken for granted that happiness is one of the most important values guiding people's lives". Western cultures are more driven by an urge to maximize happiness and to minimize sadness. Failing to appear happy often gives cause for concern. The value placed on happiness echoes through Western positive psychology and through research on subjective well-being.

These findings "call into question the notion that happiness is the ultimate goal, a belief echoed in any number of articles and self-help publications about whether certain choices are likely to make you happy". Also, "in cultures that believe worldly happiness to be associated with sin, shallowness, and moral decline will actually feel less satisfied when their lives are (by other standards) going well", so measures of personal happiness cannot simply be considered a yardstick for satisfaction with one's life, and attitudes such as aversion to happiness have important implications for measuring happiness across cultures and ranking nations on happiness scores.

Aversion to happiness can be thought of as a specific example of ideal affect (described by affect valuation theory), whereby cultures vary in the extent to which they value the experience of different emotions.

== See also ==
- Display rules
- Emotions and culture
- History of emotions
