= Ermal Meta =

Italian singer-songwriter (born 1981)

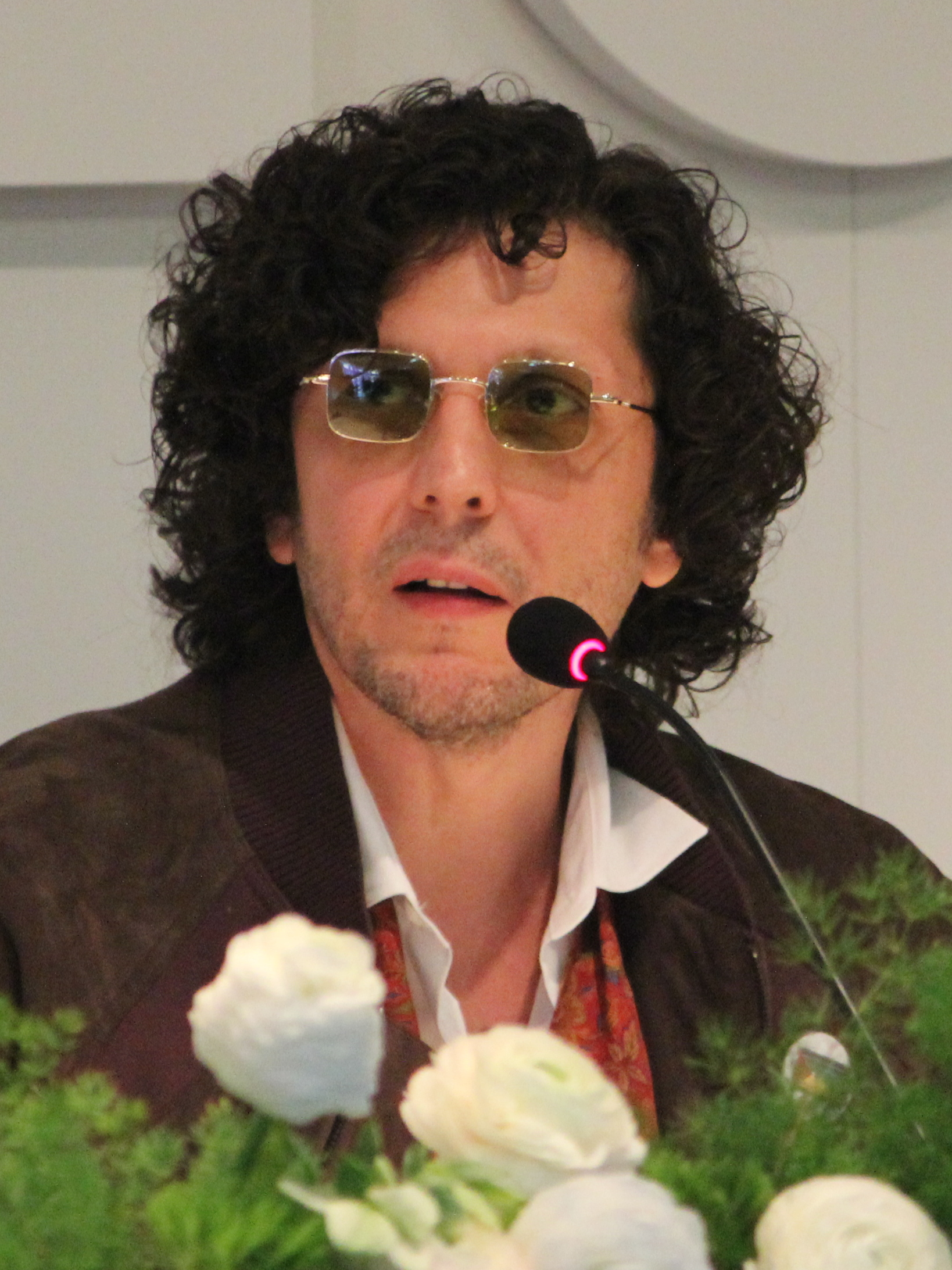
- Ermal Meta in 2026

Background information
- Born: 20 April 1981 (age 45); Fier, Albania
- Origin: Bari, Italy
- Genres: Pop; rock; alternative
- Occupations: Singer; songwriter; composer
- Instruments: Vocals; guitar; keyboard; synthesizer; bass; piano; drum machine; sampler; cajón
- Years active: 2006–present
- Label: Mescal
- Formerly of: Ameba 4, La Fame di Camilla

Ermal Meta (Italian: [ˈɛrmal ˈmɛːta], Albanian: [ɛɾˈmal ˈmɛta]; born 20 April 1981) is an Albanian-born Italian singer-songwriter.

Meta rose to prominence as one of the lead singers of Ameba 4 and La Fame di Camilla. After becoming a songwriter for several Italian artists, he launched his solo career, releasing two studio albums: Umano (2016) and Vietato morire (2017). The latter peaked at number one in Italy, and was preceded by the single with the same title, which placed third in the main competition of the Sanremo Music Festival 2017, also receiving the "Mia Martini" Critics' Prize.

In 2018, Meta won the Sanremo Music Festival alongside Fabrizio Moro with "Non mi avete fatto niente", and went on to represent Italy in the Eurovision Song Contest 2018.

== Life ==
Born in Fier, Albania, Meta and his family moved to Bari in southern Italy at the age of 13. He debuted as a guitarist of Italian band Ameba4, which competed in the Newcomers' section of the Sanremo Music Festival 2006 with the song "Rido... forse mi sbaglio", included in their self-titled album, which was released in February 2006.

== Career ==
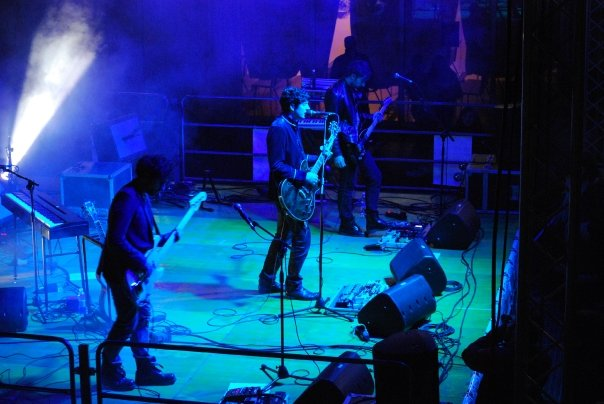
Ermal Meta performing in 2010, as a member of the band La Fame di Camilla

In 2007, Meta became the frontman, lead singer and main songwriter of the band La Fame di Camilla. Their debut album, simply titled La Fame di Camilla, was released by Universal Music in 2009. The band later released the albums Buio e luce, including the title-track which competed in the Newcomers' section of the Sanremo Music Festival 2010, and L'attesa (2012). The band split in 2013.

After writing songs for several Italian artists, including Marco Mengoni, Emma, Chiara, Annalisa, Patty Pravo and Lorenzo Fragola, Meta started his solo career. In July 2013, he appeared as a featured artist on Patty Pravo's single "Non mi interessa". In 2014, he contributed the soundtrack of Italian television series Braccialetti rossi, performing the song "Tutto si muove". In 2016, he competed in the 66th Sanremo Music Festival, performing the song "Odio le favole", which placed third in the Newcomers' section. "Odio le favole" was included in his debut solo album, Umano. He returned to the contest in 2017, competing in the Big Artists section for the first time, with the song "Vietato morire". During the third night of the contest, he performed a cover of Domenico Modugno's "Amara terra mia", receiving the award for the Best Cover Performance. Meta placed third overall in the competition, and received the "Mia Martini" Critics' Prize. His second studio album, Vietato morire, was released on 10 February 2017. The album also includes a duet with Italian singer-songwriter Elisa.

In March 2017, Meta was chosen as a judge on the 16th series of Italian talent show Amici di Maria De Filippi.

On 11 February 2018, Meta, along with Fabrizio Moro, won the Big Artists section of the Sanremo Music Festival 2018 with the song Non mi avete fatto niente, and as such, represented Italy at the Eurovision Song Contest 2018 in Lisbon, Portugal.

In 2020, he released the single "Finirà bene". In 2021, he competed in the Big Artists section of the Sanremo Music Festival 2021 with the song "Un milione di cose da dirti". He placed third in the competition.

On 30 November 2025, he was announced among the participants of the Sanremo Music Festival 2026. He competed with the song "Stella stellina".

== Discography ==
- Umano (2016)
- Vietato morire (2017)
- Non abbiamo armi (2018)
- Tribù urbana (2021)
- Buona fortuna (2024)
- Funzioni vitali (2026)

== Awards ==
Year	Award	Nomination	Work	Result	Ref.
2017	MTV Europe Music Awards	Best Italian Act	Himself	Won	

Awards and achievements
Preceded by Francesco Gabbani	Sanremo Music Festival winner (with Fabrizio Moro); 2018	Succeeded by Mahmood
Preceded by Francesco Gabbani with "Occidentali's Karma"	Italy in the Eurovision Song Contest (with Fabrizio Moro); 2018	Succeeded by Mahmood with "Soldi"
