= Giorgia discography =

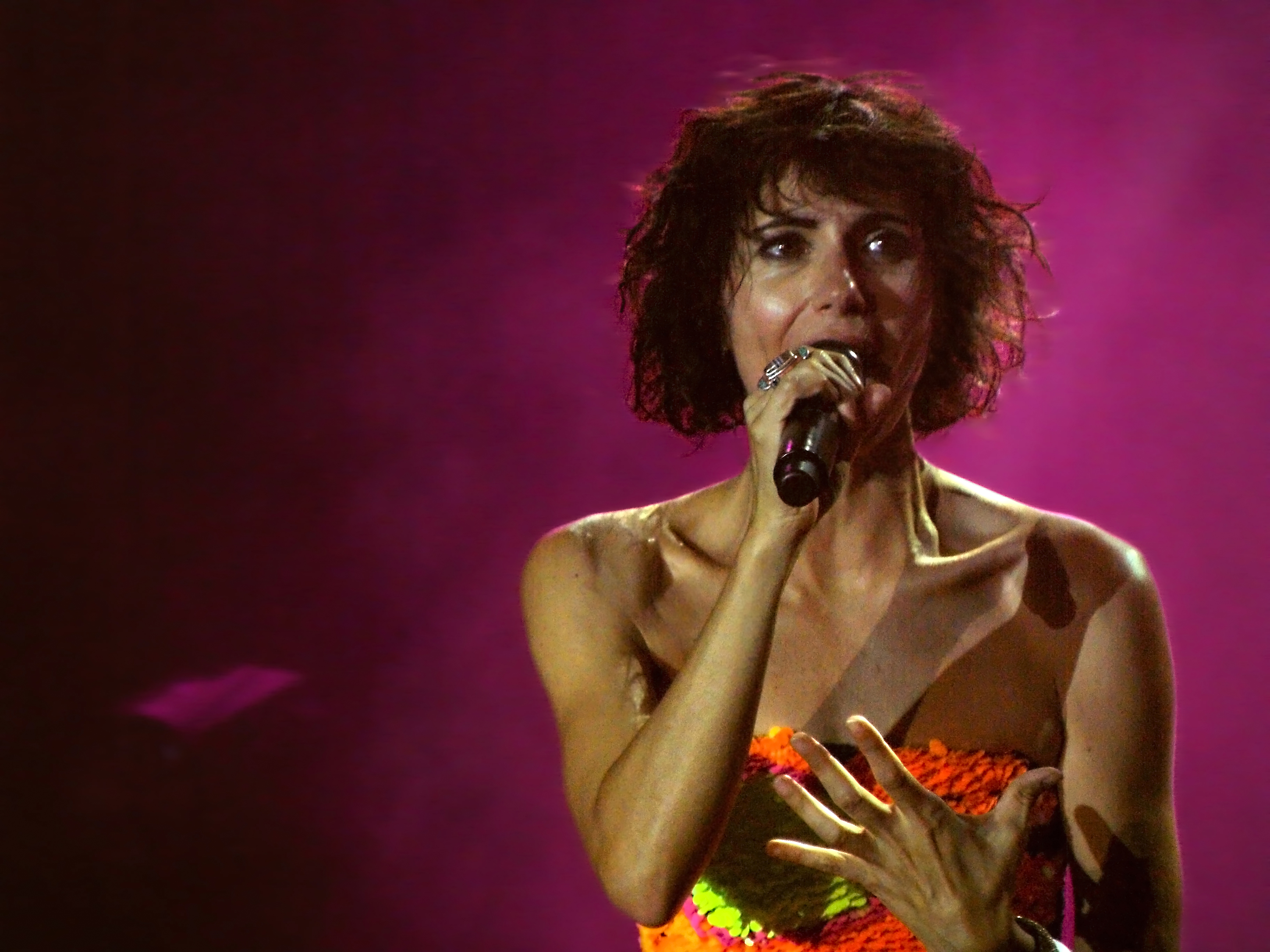
- Giorgia in 2012, performing during a concert in Milan, Italy
- Studio albums: 12
- EPs: 1
- Live albums: 3
- Compilation albums: 2
- Singles: 63
- Video albums: 1
- Music videos: 30

Italian singer Giorgia has released twelve studio albums, two compilation albums, three live albums (including one as a featured artist), one extended plays, sixty-three singles (including ten as a featured artist), one video albums and thirty music videos.

== Albums ==
=== Studio albums ===
List of albums, with selected chart positions, sales, and certifications
| Title | Album details | Peak chart positions | | Sales | Certifications |
| Title | Album details | ITA | SWI | Sales | Certifications |
|---|---|---|---|---|---|
| Giorgia | Released: 8 June 1994; Label: Sony BMG; Formats: CD | 20 | — | ITA: 150,000 (as of 2005); World: 2,000,000 | FIMI: Platinum |
| Come Thelma & Louise | Released: 19 April 1995; Label: Sony BMG; Formats: CD | 2 | 46 | ITA: 300,000 (as of 2002); World: 8,000,000 | FIMI: 3× Platinum |
| Mangio troppa cioccolata | Released: 5 September 1997; Label: Sony BMG, Ricordi; Formats: CD | 1 | — | ITA: 200,000 (as of 2002); World: 1,000,000 | FIMI: 2× Platinum |
| Girasole | Released: 14 April 1999; Label: Dischi di cioccolata, Sony BMG, Ricordi; Formats: CD | 8 | — | ITA: 200,000 (as of 2002) | FIMI: 2× Platinum |
| Senza ali | Released: 2 March 2001; Label: Dischi di cioccolata, Sony BMG; Formats: CD | 3 | 47 | ITA: 200,000+ (as of 2001); World: 6,000,000 | FIMI: 2× Platinum |
| Ladra di vento | Released: 12 September 2003; Label: Dischi di cioccolata, Sony BMG; Formats: CD | 1 | 79 | ITA: 200,000+ (as of 2004) | FIMI: 2× Platinum |
| Stonata | Released: 14 November 2007; Label: Dischi di cioccolata; Formats: CD | 2 | — | ITA: 150,000 (as of 2007) | FIMI: 2× Platinum |
| Dietro le apparenze | Released: 6 September 2011; Label: Dischi di cioccolata; Formats: CD, digital download | 1 | 19 | ITA: 120,000+ (as of 2012) | FIMI: 2× Platinum |
| Senza paura | Released: 5 November 2013; Label: Dischi di cioccolata; Formats: CD, digital download | 1 | 58 | ITA: 100,000+ (as of 2014) | FIMI: 2× Platinum |
| Oronero | Released: 28 October 2016; Label: Microphonica, Sony; Formats: CD, digital download | 2 | 39 | ITA: 100,000+ (as of 2018) | FIMI: 2× Platinum |
| Pop Heart | Released: 16 November 2018; Label: Microphonica, Sony; Formats: CD, digital download | 2 | 44 | ITA: 50,000+ (as of 2021) | FIMI: Platinum |
| Blu¹ | Released: 17 February 2023; Label: Microphonica, Sony; Formats: CD, digital download | 12 | — | | |
| G | Released: 7 November 2025; Label: Microphonica, Sony; Formats: CD, digital download, streaming | 1 | — | | |
"—" denotes albums that did not chart or were not released.

=== Compilation ===
| Title | Album details | Peak chart positions | | Sales | Certifications |
| Title | Album details | ITA | SWI | Sales | Certifications |
|---|---|---|---|---|---|
| Greatest Hits – Le cose non vanno mai come credi | Released: 12 June 2002; Label: Dischi di cioccolata, Sony BMG; Formats: CD | 1 | 49 | ITA: 950,000+ (as of 2013); World: 5,000,000 | FIMI: Diamond + Gold |
| Spirito libero – Viaggi di voce 1992-2008 | Released: 21 November 2008; Label: Dischi di cioccolata; Formats: CD | 5 | — | ITA: 190,000 (as of 2008) | FIMI: 2× Platinum |
"—" denotes albums that did not chart or were not released.

=== Live albums ===
List of albums, with selected chart positions, sales, and certifications
| Title | Album details | Peak chart positions | Sales | Certifications |
| Title | Album details | ITA | Sales | Certifications |
|---|---|---|---|---|
| Strano il mio destino (Live & studio 95/96) | Released: 20 February 1996; Label: Sony BMG; Formats: CD | 4 | ITA: 200,000 (as of 2002) | FIMI: 2× Platinum |
| MTV Unplugged | Released: 16 July 2005; Label: Dischi di cioccolata; Formats: CD | 2 | ITA: 200,000+ (as of 2014) | FIMI: 2× Platinum |
| Oronero live | Released: 19 January 2018; Label: Sony Music; Formats: CD, digital download | 5 | | |

== Extended plays ==
| Title | EP details |
|---|---|
| Giorgia – Live alla Casa del Jazz | Released: 5 February 2008; Label: Sony BMG; Formats: Digital download |

== Singles ==
=== As lead artist ===
| Title | Year | Peak chart positions | | | | Sales | Certifications | Album |
| Title | Year | ITA | FRA | SWI | WW | Sales | Certifications | Album |
|---|---|---|---|---|---|---|---|---|
| "E poi" | 1994 | 2 | — | — | — | | | Giorgia |
| "Nessun dolore" | 1994 | 39 | — | — | — | | | Giorgia |
| "Come saprei" | 1995 | 1 | — | — | — | | FIMI: Gold | Come Thelma & Louise |
| "C'è da fare" | 1995 | 8 | — | — | — | | | Come Thelma & Louise |
| "E c'è ancora mare" | 1995 | 45 | — | — | — | | | Come Thelma & Louise |
| "Riguarda noi" | 1995 | 19 | — | — | — | | | Come Thelma & Louise |
| "Strano il mio destino" | 1996 | 6 | — | — | — | | | Strano il mio destino (Live & studio 95/96) |
| "Un'ora sola ti vorrei" | 1997 | 3 | — | — | — | | | Mangio troppa cioccolata |
| "Dimmi dove sei" | 1997 | 40 | — | — | — | | | Mangio troppa cioccolata |
| "Un amore da favola" | 1997 | 27 | — | — | — | | | Mangio troppa cioccolata |
| "In vacanza con me" | 1998 | 35 | — | — | — | | | Mangio troppa cioccolata |
| "Il cielo in una stanza" | 1999 | 1 | — | — | — | | | Girasole |
| "Parlami d'amore" | 1999 | — | — | — | — | | | Girasole |
| "Girasole" | 1999 | 5 | — | — | — | | FIMI: Gold | Girasole |
| "Tradirefare" | 1999 | 4 | — | — | — | | | Girasole |
| "Io come te" | 1999 | 39 | — | — | — | | | Girasole |
| "Di sole e d'azzurro" | 2001 | 2 | 31 | — | — | | | Senza ali |
| "Senza ali" | 2001 | 11 | — | — | — | | | Senza ali |
| "Un sole dentro al cuore" | 2001 | 8 | — | — | — | | | Senza ali |
| "Save the World" | 2001 | 46 | — | — | — | | | Senza ali |
| "Vivi davvero" | 2002 | 6 | — | — | — | | | Greatest Hits – Le cose non vanno mai come credi |
| "Marzo" | 2002 | 5 | — | — | — | | | Greatest Hits – Le cose non vanno mai come credi |
| "Gocce di memoria" | 2003 | 1 | — | 70 | — | ITA: 135,000+ (as of 2014) | FIMI: Platinum | Ladra di vento |
| "Spirito libero" | 2003 | 5 | — | — | — | | | Ladra di vento |
| "L'eternità" | 2003 | 29 | — | — | — | | | Ladra di vento |
| "La gatta (sul tetto)" | 2003 | 50 | — | — | — | | | Ladra di vento |
| "Infinite volte" | 2005 | — | — | — | — | | | MTV Unplugged (Giorgia) |
| "Parlo con te" | 2007 | 30 | — | — | — | | | Stonata |
| "La la song (non credo di essere al sicuro)" | 2007 | 12 | — | — | — | | | Stonata |
| "Ora basta" | 2008 | — | — | — | — | | | Stonata |
| "Poche parole" (featuring Mina) | 2008 | 10 | — | — | — | | | Stonata |
| "Per fare a meno di te" | 2008 | 6 | — | — | — | | | Spirito libero – Viaggi di voce 1992–2008 |
| "Il mio giorno migliore" | 2011 | 6 | — | — | — | ITA: 30,000+ (as of 2011) | FIMI: Platinum | Dietro le apparenze |
| "È l'amore che conta" | 2011 | 9 | — | — | — | ITA: 30,000+ (as of 2013) | FIMI: Platinum | Dietro le apparenze |
| "Inevitabile" (with Eros Ramazzotti) | 2011 | 9 | — | — | — | ITA: 30,000+ (as of 2012) | FIMI: Platinum | Dietro le apparenze |
| "Dove sei" | 2012 | — | — | — | — | | | Dietro le apparenze |
| "Tu mi porti su" | 2012 | 6 | — | — | — | ITA: 60,000+ (as of 2014) | FIMI: 2× Platinum | Dietro le apparenze |
| "Quando una stella muore" | 2013 | 10 | — | — | — | ITA: 30,000+ (as of 2014) | FIMI: Platinum | Senza paura |
| "I Will Pray (Pregherò)" (with Alicia Keys) | 2013 | 17 | — | — | — | ITA: 15,000+ (as of 2014) | FIMI: Gold | Senza paura |
| "Non mi ami" | 2014 | 5 | — | — | — | ITA: 30,000+ (as of 2014) | FIMI: Platinum | Senza paura |
| "Io fra tanti" | 2014 | — | — | — | — | ITA: 15,000+ (as of 2015) | FIMI: Gold | Senza paura |
| "La mia stanza" | 2014 | — | — | — | — | | | Senza paura |
| "Oronero" | 2016 | 18 | — | — | — | ITA: 50,000+ (as of 2019) | FIMI: Platinum | Oronero |
| "Vanità" | 2017 | 48 | — | — | — | ITA: 50,000+ (as of 2019) | FIMI: Platinum | Oronero |
| "Credo" | 2017 | 54 | — | — | — | ITA: 50,000+ (as of 2019) | FIMI: Platinum | Oronero |
| "Scelgo ancora te" | 2017 | 97 | — | — | — | ITA: 50,000+ (as of 2019) | FIMI: Platinum | Oronero |
| "Come neve" (with Marco Mengoni) | 2017 | 3 | — | 76 | — | ITA: 100,000+ (as of 2019) | FIMI: 2× Platinum | Oronero Live |
| "Le tasche piene di sassi" | 2018 | 42 | — | — | — | ITA: 25,000+ (as of 2023) | FIMI: Gold | Pop Heart |
| "Una storia importante" | 2018 | — | — | — | — | | | Pop Heart |
| "I Feel Love" | 2018 | — | — | — | — | | | Pop Heart |
| "Normale" | 2022 | — | — | — | — | | | Blu1 |
| "Parole dette male" | 2023 | 18 | — | — | — | ITA: 50,000+ (as of 2023) | FIMI: Gold | Blu1 |
| "Senza confine" | 2023 | — | — | — | — | | | Blu1 |
| "Niente di male" | 2024 | 84 | — | — | — | | | G |
| "La cura per me" | 2025 | 2 | — | 17 | 193 | ITA: 400,000+ | FIMI: Platinum; World: 2,000,000 | G |
| "L'unica" | 2025 | 60 | — | — | — | | | G |
| "Golpe" | 2025 | 43 | — | — | — | | | G |
| "Superstar" (with Tiziano Ferro) | 2026 | 91 | — | — | — | | | Sono un grande (Deluxe) |

=== As featured artist ===
| Title | Year | Peak chart positions | | Sales | Certifications | Album |
| Title | Year | ITA | NLD | Sales | Certifications | Album |
|---|---|---|---|---|---|---|
| "Che goccia sei" (Mario Amici feat. Giorgia) | 1994 | — | — | | | Mario Amici |
| "Vivo per lei" (Andrea Bocelli feat. Giorgia) | 1995 | — | 39 | ITA: 15,000+ (as of 2013) | FIMI: Gold | Bocelli |
| "T.V.U.M.D.B./Mio cuggino" (Elio e le Storie Tese feat. Giorgia) | 1996 | — | — | | | Eat the Phikis |
| "Scirocco d'Africa" (Pino Daniele feat. Giorgia) | 1997 | — | — | | | Dimmi cosa succede sulla terra |
| "We've Got Tonight" (Ronan Keating feat. Giorgia) | 2002 | — | — | | | Destination |
| "Vento di passione" (Pino Daniele feat. Giorgia) | 2007 | — | — | | | Il mio nome è Pino Daniele e vivo qui |
| "Ignudo fra i nudisti" (Elio e le Storie Tese feat. Giorgia) | 2008 | — | — | | | Studentessi |
| "Salvami" (Gianna Nannini feat. Giorgia) | 2009 | 1 | — | ITA: 60,000+ (as of 2009) | FIMI: 2× Platinum | Giannadream - Solo i sogni sono veri |
| "Domani 21/04.09" (Artisti Uniti per l'Abruzzo) | 2009 | 1 | — | ITA: 524,000+ (as of 2010) | FIMI: 2× Platinum | Charity Singles |
| "Donna d'Onna" (live) (Laura Pausini, Gianna Nannini, Giorgia, Elisa & Fiorella Mannoia) | 2010 | 8 | — | | | Charity Singles |
| "Scatola nera" (Gemitaiz e MadMan feat. Giorgia) | 2019 | 13 | — | ITA: 35,000+ (as of 2020) | FIMI:Gold | Scatola nera |
| "Parentesi" (Mara Sattei feat. Giorgia) | 2022 | 67 | — | ITA: 50,000+ (as of 2024) | FIMI:Gold | Universo |
| "L'ultima canzone" (Geolier feat. Giorgia) | 2023 | 40 | — | ITA: 50,000+ (as of 2024) | FIMI:Gold | Il coraggio dei bambini – Atto II |
| "La mia vittoria" (Luchè feat. Giorgia and Marracash) | 2025 | 46 | — | | | Il mio lato peggiore |

== Videography ==
=== Video albums ===
List of albums, with selected sales and chart positions on the video albums charts
| Title | Album details | Peak chart positions |
| Title | Album details | ITA |
|---|---|---|
| Ladra di vento live 03/04 | Released: 11 July 2004; Label: Sony BMG; Format: DVD | 1 |

=== Featured video albums ===
List of albums, with selected sales and chart positions on the video albums charts
| Title | Album details | Peak chart positions | Sales |
| Title | Album details | ITA | Sales |
|---|---|---|---|
| Amiche per l'Abruzzo | Released: 22 June 2010; Format: DVD; Live album by Giorgia & various Italian female artists; Language: Italian | 1 | ITA: 250,000 (as of 2011) |

=== Music videos ===
As lead artist
| Title | Year | Director(s) |
|---|---|---|
| "Come saprei" | 1995 | Stefano Salvati |
| "Riguarda noi" | 1995 | Stefano Salvati |
| "Un'ora sola ti vorrei" | 1997 | Sergio Pappalettera |
| "Un amore da favola" | 1997 | Sergio Pappalettera |
| "Dimmi dove sei" | 1997 | Sergio Pappalettera |
| "Girasole" | 1999 | Sergio Pappalettera |
| "Parlami d'amore" | 1999 | Sergio Pappalettera |
| "Save the world" | 2001 | Francesco Cabras and Alberto Molinari |
| "Vivi davvero" | 2002 | Michelangelo Gelormini |
| "Marzo" | 2002 | Luca Tommassini |
| "Spirito libero" | 2003 | Luca Tommassini |
| "La gatta (sul tetto)" | 2003 | Luca Tommassini |
| "L'eternità" | 2003 | Luca Tommassini |
| "Gocce di memoria" | 2003 | Gianluca Mazzella |
| "I Heard it Through the Grapevine" (featuring Ricky Fanté) | 2005 | Cristian Biondani |
| "Infinite volte" | 2005 | Fabio Jansen |
| "La la song (non credo di essere al sicuro)" | 2007 | Luca Tommassini and Eleven |
| "Parlo con te" | 2007 | Daniele Persica |
| "Ora basta" | 2007 | Gaetano Morbioli |
| "Per fare a meno di te" | 2008 | Luca Lucini |
| "Il mio giorno migliore" | 2011 | Gaetano Morbioli |
| "È l'amore che conta" | 2011 | Gaetano Morbioli |
| "Inevitabile" (featuring Eros Ramazzotti) | 2011 | Gaetano Morbioli |
| "Dove sei" | 2012 | Emanuel Lo |
| "Tu mi porti su" | 2012 | Unknown |
| "Quando una stella muore" | 2013 | Gaetano Morbioli |
| "Non mi ami" | 2014 | Emanuel Lo |
| "Io fra tanti" | 2014 | Emanuel Lo |
| "Oronero" | 2016 | Emanuel Lo |
| "Vanità" | 2017 | Cosimo Alemà |

As featured artist
| "Ignudo fra i nudisti" (Elio e le Storie Tese feat. Giorgia) | 2008 | Marcello Macchia | Studentessi |
| "Salvami" (Gianna Nannini feat. Giorgia) | 2009 | Gaetano Morbioli | Giannadream - Solo i sogni sono veri |
