= Ivana Spagna discography =

Spagna discography
- Studio albums: 17
- Compilation albums: 13
- Singles: 57
- Video albums: 1

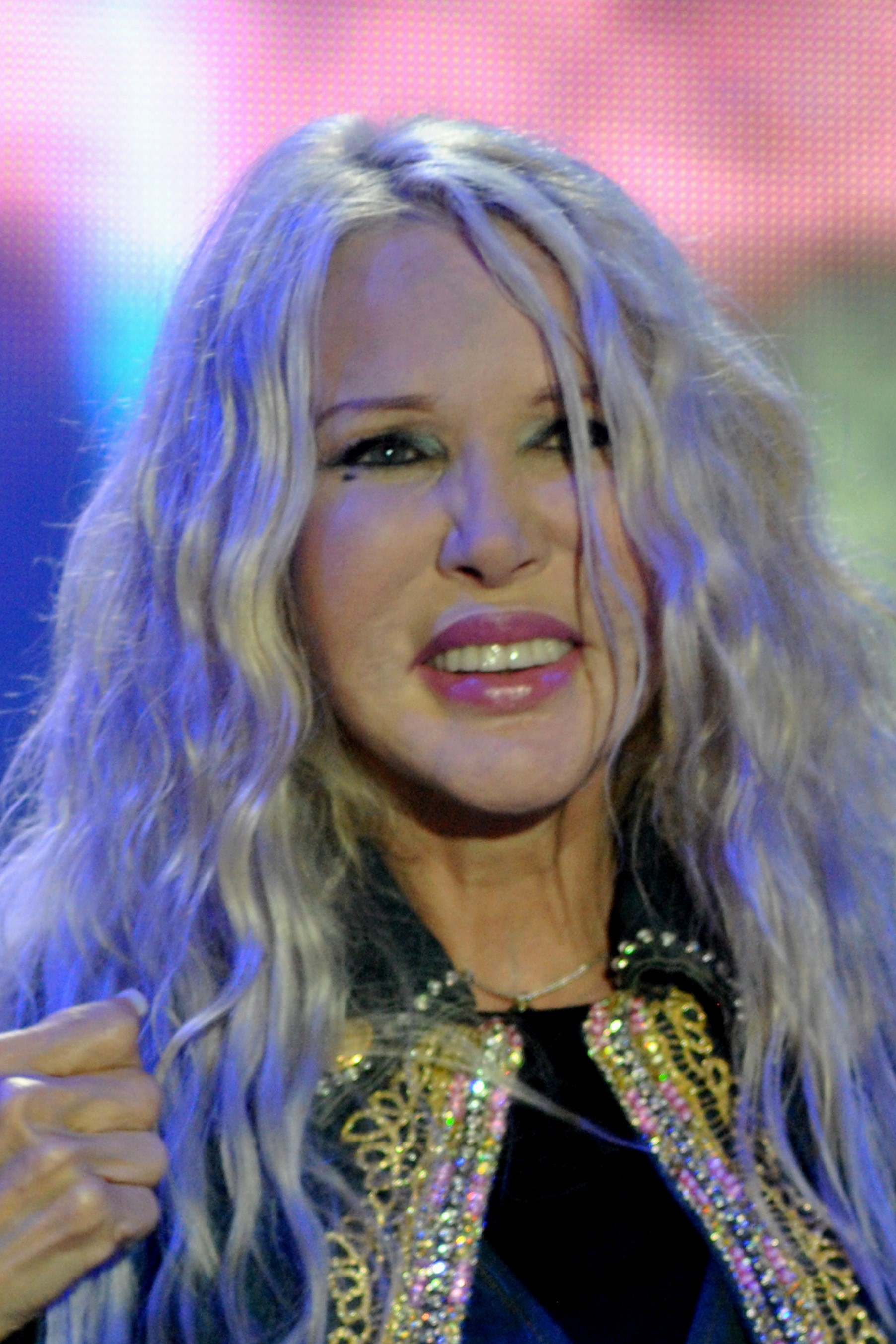
Spagna c. 2016

This is the discography of Italian singer and songwriter Ivana Spagna.

== Albums ==
=== Studio albums ===
Title	Album details	Peak chart positions				Certifications
Title	Album details	ITA	FIN	SWE	SWI	Certifications
Dedicated to the Moon	Released: April 1987; Label: CBS; Formats: CD, LP, MC	31	4	38	18	FIN: Gold
You Are My Energy	Released: November 1988; Label: CBS; Formats: CD, LP, MC	25	9	—	—	
No Way Out	Released: June 1991; Label: Epic; Formats: CD, LP, MC	5	—	—	—	ITA: Platinum
Matter of Time	Released: October 1993; Label: Epic; Formats: CD, MC	—	—	—	—	
Siamo in due	Released: February 1995; Label: Epic; Formats: CD, MC	4	—	—	—	ITA: 3× Platinum
Lupi solitari	Released: February 1996; Label: Epic; Formats: CD, MC, MD	3	—	—	30	ITA: 4× Platinum
Indivisibili	Released: April 1997; Label: Epic; Formats: CD, MC	10	—	—	—	ITA: 2× Platinum
Domani	Released: March 2000; Label: Epic; Formats: CD, MC	32	—	—	—	
La nostra canzone	Released: May 2001; Label: Epic; Formats: CD, MC	28	—	—	—	
Woman	Released: November 2002; Label: B&G Entertainment; Formats: CD, MC	—	—	—	—	ITA: Platinum
L'arte di arrangiarsi	Released: May 2004; Label: B&G Entertainment; Formats: CD	60	—	—	—	
Diario di bordo	Released: May 2005; Label: NAR International; Formats: CD; Expanded re-release in 2006 as Diario di bordo – Voglio sdraiarmi al sole	62	—	—	—	
Lola & Angiolina Project (with Loredana Bertè)	Released: February 2009; Label: Edel; Formats: CD; Mini-album	26	—	—	—	
Il cerchio della vita	Released: November 2009; Label: Grooves; Formats: CD	—	—	—	—	
Buon Natale	Released: November 2010; Label: Grooves; Formats: CD	—	—	—	—	
Four	Released: January 2012; Label: Soul Trade; Formats: CD, digital download	57	—	—	—	
1954	Released: 25 October 2019; Label: Tuned Turtle; Formats: CD, LP, digital download	29	—	—	—	
"—" denotes releases that did not chart or were not released in that territory.

=== Compilation albums ===
Title	Album details	Peak chart positions	Certifications
Title	Album details	ITA	Certifications
Greatest Hits	Released: March 1993; Label: Epic; Formats: CD, LP, MC	—	
Dance Collection	Released: July 1997; Label: Epic/Sony Music; Formats: CD	—	
E che mai sarà – Le mie più belle canzoni	Released: February 1998; Label: Epic; Formats: CD, MC	23	ITA: Platinum
Le sue più belle canzoni	Released: May 2004; Label: Epic/Sony Music; Formats: CD	—	
Ivana Spagna	Released: 2005; Label: Sony BMG/RCA; Formats: 3xCD	—	
I grandi successi	Released: February 2006; Label: Sony BMG/Epic; Formats: 3xCD	97	
Superissimi gli eroi del juke box	Released: October 2006; Label: Sony BMG/Epic; Formats: 2xCD	—	
Le più belle di...	Released: July 2007; Label: Sony BMG; Formats: CD	—	
Flashback – I grandi successi originali	Released: 2009; Label: Sony Music; Formats: 2xCD	—	
Greatest Hits	Released: March 2011; Label: BMG/Sony Music; Formats: 3xCD	—	
Semplicemente Veneta	Released: July 2011; Label: Azzurra Music; Formats: CD	—	
Un'ora con...	Released: June 2012; Label: Sony Music; Formats: CD	—	
Remember Easy Hits	Released: September 2014; Label: Benvenuto; Formats: CD	—	
"—" denotes releases that did not chart or were not released in that territory.

=== Video albums ===
Title	Album details
Spagna & Spagna	Released: 1993; Label: SMV; Formats: VHS

== Singles ==
Title	Year	Peak chart positions										Certifications	Albums
Title	Year	ITA	FIN	FRA	GER	NL	NOR	SPA	SWI	UK	US Dance	Certifications	Albums
"Mamy Blue"	1971	—	—	—	—	—	—	—	—	—	—		Non-album singles
"Ari Ari"	1972	—	—	—	—	—	—	—	—	—	—		Non-album singles
"I've Got the Music in Me" (as Yvonne K.)	1983	—	—	—	—	—	—	—	—	—	—		Non-album singles
"Rise Up (For My Love)" (as Yvonne Kay)	1985	—	—	—	—	—	—	—	—	—	—		Non-album singles
"Easy Lady"	1986	1	—	4	12	16	—	1	2	62	—	FRA: Silver; SPA: Gold	Dedicated to the Moon
"Call Me"	1987	2	5	4	10	7	4	1	7	2	—	FRA: Silver; SPA: Platinum	Dedicated to the Moon
"Dance Dance Dance"	1987	6	18	38	27	—	—	35	22	—	—		Dedicated to the Moon
"Dedicated to the Moon"	1987	—	—	—	—	—	—	—	—	—	—		Dedicated to the Moon
"Sarah"	1987	—	—	—	—	—	—	—	—	—	—		Dedicated to the Moon
"Call Me" (US remix)	1988	—	—	—	—	—	—	—	—	—	13		Dedicated to the Moon
"Every Girl and Boy"	1988	4	5	20	—	65	—	6	18	23	—		You Are My Energy
"I Wanna Be Your Wife"	1988	13	1	34	—	—	8	—	—	82	—		You Are My Energy
"This Generation"	1989	20	18	—	—	—	—	—	—	—	—		You Are My Energy
"Only Words"	1991	—	—	—	—	—	—	—	—	—	—		No Way Out
"Love at First Sight"	1991	—	10	—	—	—	—	—	—	77	—		No Way Out
"No Way Out"	1992	—	—	—	—	—	—	—	—	—	—		No Way Out
"I Always Dream About You"	1993	8	—	43	—	—	—	—	—	—	—		Matter of Time
"Why Me"	1993	13	—	—	—	—	—	—	—	—	—		Matter of Time
"Lady Madonna"	1994	9	—	—	—	—	—	—	—	—	—		Non-album single
"Il cerchio della vita"	1994	6	—	—	—	—	—	—	—	—	—	ITA: Gold	Il re leone soundtrack
"Circle of Life" (Euro pop dance version)	1994	—	—	—	—	—	—	—	—	—	—		Il re leone soundtrack
"Come il cielo"	1995	—	—	—	—	—	—	—	—	—	—		Siamo in due
"Gente come noi"	1995	5	—	—	—	—	—	—	—	—	—		Siamo in due
"E io penso a te"	1996	8	—	—	—	—	—	—	—	—	—		Lupi solitari
"Ci sarò"	1996	—	—	—	—	—	—	—	—	—	—		Lupi solitari
"Indivisibili"	1997	—	—	—	—	—	—	—	—	—	—		Indivisibili
"E che mai sarà"	1998	—	—	—	—	—	—	—	—	—	—		E che mai sarà – Le mie più belle canzoni
"Il bello della vita"	1998	—	—	—	—	—	—	—	—	—	—		E che mai sarà – Le mie più belle canzoni
"So volare"	1998	—	—	—	—	—	—	—	—	—	—		La gabbianella e il gatto soundtrack
"Con il tuo nome"	2000	—	—	—	—	—	—	—	—	—	—		Domani
"Mi amor"	2000	—	—	—	—	—	—	—	—	—	—		Domani
"Quella carezza della sera"	2001	49	—	—	—	—	—	—	—	—	—		La nostra canzone
"Eloise"	2001	—	—	—	—	—	—	—	—	—	—		La nostra canzone
"Never Say You Love Me"	2002	34	—	—	—	—	—	—	—	—	—		Woman
"Do It with Style"	2003	32	—	—	—	—	—	—	—	—	—		Woman
"Easy Lady 2004" (Ice & Cream vs Spagna)	2004	—	—	—	—	—	—	—	—	—	—		Non-album single
"Noi non possiamo cambiare"	2006	25	—	—	—	—	—	—	—	—	—		Diario di bordo – Voglio sdraiarmi al sole
"Gli occhi verdi dell'amore" (with Zeta Clan)	2007	26	—	—	—	—	—	—	—	—	—		Non-album single
"Musica e parole" (with Loredana Bertè)	2008	20	—	—	—	—	—	—	—	—	—		Lola & Angiolina Project
"Dancing on the Beach" (with Robb Cole)	2008	—	—	—	—	—	—	—	—	—	—		Non-album singles
"Easy Lady" (2009 remake)	2009	—	—	—	—	—	—	—	—	—	—		Non-album singles
"Call Me" (2010 remake)	2010	—	—	—	—	—	—	—	—	—	—		Non-album singles
"The Magic of Love"	2014	45	—	—	—	—	—	—	—	—	—		Non-album singles
"Baby Don't Go"	2015	—	—	—	—	—	—	—	—	—	—		Non-album singles
"Straight to Hell"	2015	—	—	—	—	—	—	—	—	—	—		Non-album singles
"D.A.N.C.E." (featuring Jøser)	2016	—	—	—	—	—	—	—	—	—	—		Non-album singles
"A Natale crolla il mondo"	2016	—	—	—	—	—	—	—	—	—	—		Non-album singles
"Nessuno è come te"	2019	—	—	—	—	—	—	—	—	—	—		1954
"Cartagena" (with Jay Santos)	2019	—	—	—	—	—	—	—	—	—	—		1954
"Have You Ever Seen the Rain" (limited release)	2021	—	—	—	—	—	—	—	—	—	—		Non-album singles
"Seriously in Love"	2022	—	—	—	—	—	—	—	—	—	—		Non-album singles
"Napoli Cuba"	2022	—	—	—	—	—	—	—	—	—	—		Non-album singles
"Volevo tutto" (with King Horus)	2022	—	—	—	—	—	—	—	—	—	—		Non-album singles
"Happy Station (Radio Mix)" (with Paul Jockey)	2024	—	—	—	—	—	—	—	—	—	—		Non-album singles
"Sarà bellissimo" (with Legno)	2024	—	—	—	—	—	—	—	—	—	—		Non-album singles
"T'amo t'amo t'amo" (with Nuzzle)	2024	—	—	—	—	—	—	—	—	—	—	ITA: Gold	Non-album singles
"Amore mio (T'amo t'amo t'amo)" (with Nuzzle)	2024	—	—	—	—	—	—	—	—	—	—		Non-album singles
"—" denotes releases that did not chart or were not released in that territory.
