= Gente come noi =

Single by Spagna

from the album Siamo in due
- Language: Italian
- B-side: "Gente come noi" (Karaoke Version)
- Released: February 1995
- Genre: Pop
- Length: 4:06
- Label: Epic
- Composers: Ivana Spagna; Giorgio Spagna; Angelo Valsiglio
- Lyricists: Ivana Spagna; Marco Marati; Fio Zanotti
- Producers: Angelo Valsiglio; Marco Marati

Spagna singles chronology
| "Il cerchio della vita" (1994) | "Gente come noi" (1995) | "Come il cielo" (Gam Gam Remix) (1995) |

Music video
- "Gente come noi" on YouTube

"Gente come noi" (transl. "People like Us") is a 1995 song performed by Italian singer Spagna, released as the second single from her album Siamo in due. It was co-authored by Spagna with her brother Giorgio "Theo" Spagna (music), Angelo Valsiglio (music), Marco Marati (lyrics) and Fio Zanotti (lyrics).

The song was selected by Pippo Baudo to compete in the 45th edition of the Sanremo Music Festival, where it finished third above "Con te partirò" by Andrea Bocelli; Baudo had looked for Spagna to be among the participants following her success with "Il cerchio della vita" (the Italian version of "Circle of Life" from Disney's The Lion King) in 1994.

The single reached the top 5 in the national charts and marked Spagna's permanent shift from English-language disco to Italian pop. With over 400,000 copies, Siamo in due – which also featured "Il cerchio della vita" – went on to become the best-selling album by a female artist in Italy in 1995, along with Come Thelma & Louise by Giorgia.

== Charts ==
Weekly chart performance for "Gente come noi"
| Chart (1995) | Peak position |
|---|---|
| Italy (Musica e dischi) | 5 |
