= Jacopo Sol =

Italian singer-songwriter (born 2002)

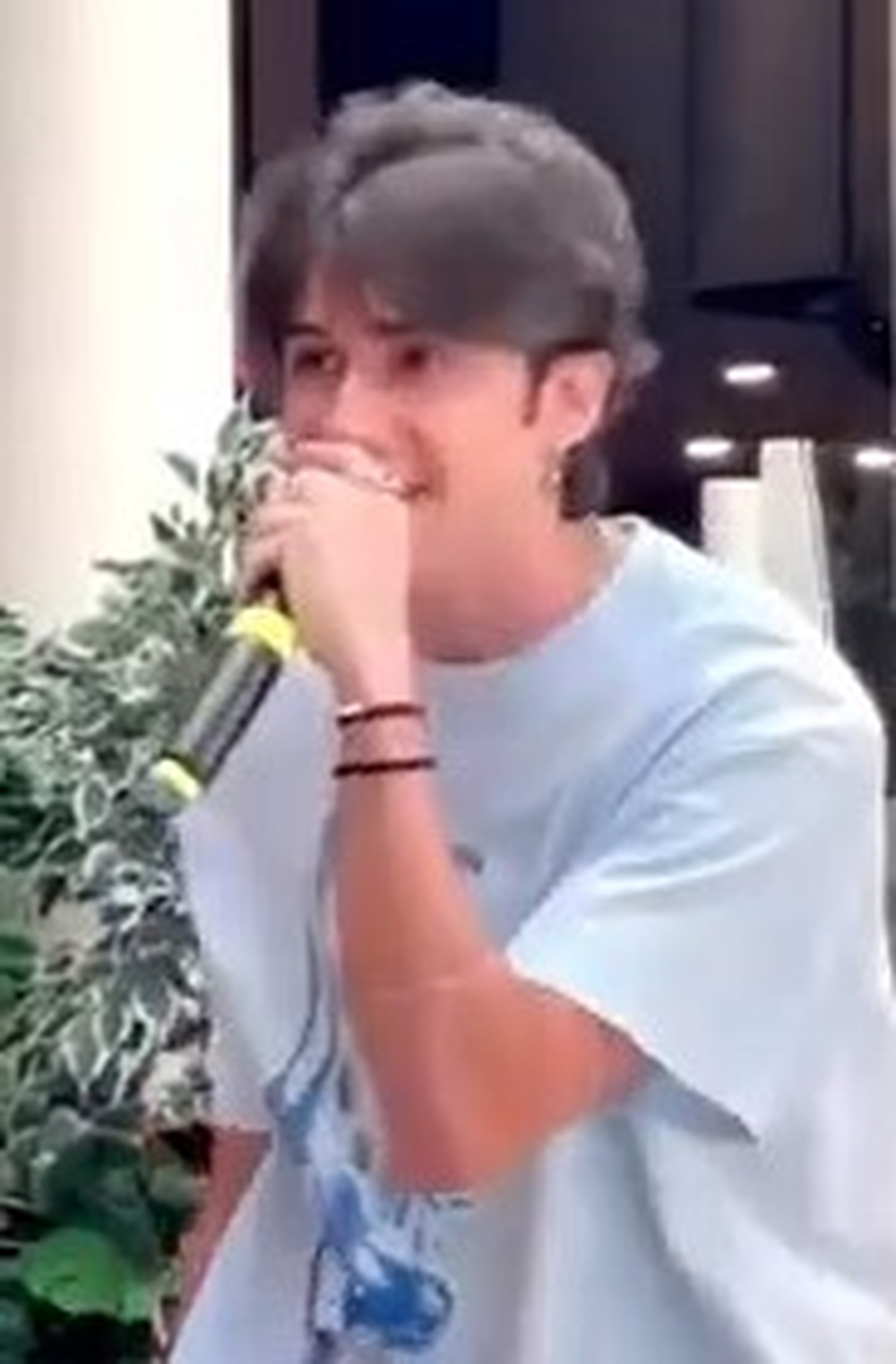
- Jacopo Sol in October 2025

Background information
- Born: Jacopo Pio Porporino; 20 May 2002 (age 24); San Severo, Apulia, Italy
- Genres: Pop
- Occupations: Singer; songwriter
- Instruments: Vocals; guitar; piano
- Years active: 2023–present
- Labels: Island; Universal Music Italia

Jacopo Pio Porporino (born 20 May 2002), known professionally as Jacopo Sol, is an Italian singer-songwriter.

== Early life and education ==
Born in 2002 in San Severo (FG), in Apulia, he is the son of Ondina and Leonardo Porporino and has a brother, Nanni, who lives in London. At the age of eight, his mother enrolled him in a guitar class, where the first thing he learned was the G major key, thus drawing inspiration for his stage name "Jacopo Sol".

In May 2022 he moved to Milan to pursue a musical career while simultaneously studying Economics at Bocconi University.

== Career ==
In 2023 he released his first singles "Ancora" with Cripo, "Dormi", "+ Tempo" and "Dove sei?" with Sir Prodige. These were followed by the collaboration with Cripo and Dante in the single "Slay". On 19 December he participated in Sanremo Giovani 2024 with the song "Cose che non sai", but failing to qualify for the Sanremo Music Festival 2024. The single "Slowmo" was released on 24 June 2024, followed on 19 July by the single "Mamasì" featuring Cripo, Lildombaby and Sir Prodige.

In December 2024 he joined the cast of the twenty-fourth edition of Canale 5's musical talent show Amici di Maria De Filippi, entering the initial phase. In February 2025, he entered the series phase of the show by joining professor Alessandra Celentano and Rudy Zerbi's team, being eliminated during the seventh episode. During the show, he released several new songs, including "Complici", "Di tutti" and "Estremo", all third of which were later included in her debut EP, Dove finiscono i sogni?, released on 24 May 2025 by Island Records and Universal Music Italia.

On 25 June 2025 the single "Respiro" featuring Jr Stit was released, followed on 24 October by the single "Luci spente" and on 12 December by the single "Gran finale". On 13 February 2026 the single "Lei" was released.

== Discography ==
=== Extended plays ===
List of EPs and with selected chart positions
Title	EP details	Peak chart positions
Title	EP details	ITA
Dove finiscono i sogni?	Released: 23 May 2025; Label: Island, Universal Music Italia; Format: CD, digital download, streaming	25

=== Singles ===
List of singles and album name
Single	Year	Album or EP
"Ancora" (with Cripo)	2023	Non-album singles
"Dormi"	2023	Non-album singles
"+ Tempo"	2023	Non-album singles
"Dove sei?" (with Sir Prodige)	2023	Non-album singles
"Slay" (with Cripo and Dante)	2023	Non-album singles
"Cose che non sai"	2023	Non-album singles
"Slowmo"	2024	Non-album singles
"Mamasì" (Cripo featuring lildombaby, Sir Prodige and Jacopo Sol)	2024	Non-album singles
"Complici"	2025	Dove finiscono i sogni?
"Di tutti"	2025	Dove finiscono i sogni?
"Estremo"	2025	Dove finiscono i sogni?
"Respiro" (with Jr Stit)	2025	Non-album singles
"Luci spente"	2025	Non-album singles
"Gran finale"	2025	Non-album singles
"Lei"	2026	Non-album singles

== Songwriting credits ==
List of selected songs co-written by Jacopo Sol
Title	Year	Artist(s)	Album or EP
"Brutti pensieri"	2024	Rose Villain feat. Thasup	Radio Sakura
"Niente di male"	2024	Giorgia	G
"Siberia"	2025	Dante	Circo gran Siberia
"Superficie	2025	Dante	Circo gran Siberia

== Television programs ==
Year	Title	Network	Notes
2024–2025	Amici di Maria De Filippi	Canale 5	Contestant (season 24)

== Participation in singing events ==
- Sanremo Giovani (Rai 2)
  - 2023 – Not a finalist with "Cose che non sai"
