= G (Giorgia album) =

Studio album by Giorgia
- Released: 7 November 2025
- Recorded: 2024–2025
- Genre: Pop; R&B; neo soul
- Length: 38:54
- Label: Epic; Sony
- Producer: Cripo; Dardust; Enrico Brun; Katoo; Kyv; Michelangelo; Mike Defunto; Paga; Simon Says!; Sterza

Giorgia chronology
Blu (2023)	G (2025)

Singles from G
- 1. "Niente di male" Released: 18 October 2024; 2. "La cura per me" Released: 12 February 2025; 3. "L'unica" Released: 20 June 2025; 4. "Golpe" Released: 19 September 2025; 5. "Corpi celesti" Released: 12 December 2025

G is the twelfth studio album by Italian singer-songwriter Giorgia, released on 7 November 2025 by the record label Michroponica, and distributed by Epic and Sony Music.

The album was promoted by the single "La cura per me" which competed at the Sanremo Music Festival 2025, placing sixth in the final ranking and won the TIM Award.

== Background and composition ==
After Giorgia's return to the music scene in 2023 with her eleventh studio album Blu and her participation in the 73th Sanremo Music Festival with the song "Parole dette male", she announced that she had returned to the recording studio to record new songs, without any intention of releasing a new record project.

The album consists of eleven tracks, written and produced by various authors and producers including Davide Petrella, Dario Faini, Calcutta, Federica Abbate and Mara Sattei, with a second version of the song "La cura per me" in duet with Blanco, who wrote the song with Giorgia herself and producer Michelangelo. In an interview with Rolling Stone Italia, the singer explained the meaning of the album, stating that it is a continuation of her previous album Blu:

"The Blu album was based on connecting the mind with the heart, with the soul. And here too there was a bit of a continuation of that concept. How do you unite the mind with the heart? The problem is that the mind manages everything, it feels like the soul. In my opinion, this album has everything, it has mind and soul. And perhaps the fact that I didn't write in the first person but chose the right words made the songs even more mine. I felt even more responsible for the choice. [...] I used to want to talk about war, about the world dying, about ecology. Now I think it's important to give a vision, the imprint of a good attitude. To try not to be prey to emotions, but to pass through them."

== Critical reception ==
G received favorable reviews from music critics.

Mattia Marzi of Rockol stated that after the personal closure of the album Blu, Giorgia seeks to "sound contemporary, but without falling into the trap of youthfulness", maintaining her "versatile and eclectic" nature, describing G as "a deliberately multifaceted album that speaks to the present but does so with maturity", in which he found both the R&B and soul sounds of her early career and the electropop sounds of the album Dietro le apparenze. Paolo Aruffo of Today affirmed that the project marks "a new direction that is in step with the times" and "courageous", appreciating the collaboration with young writers and producers, while noting that "the wonderful pen of Giorgia is sorely missed".

== Track listing ==
G – Track listing
No.	Title	Lyrics	Music	Producer(s)	Length
1.	"La cura per me"	Giorgia Todrani; Riccardo Fabbriconi; Michele Zocca	Fabbriconi; Zocca	Michelangelo	3:35
2.	"Golpe"	Todrani; Davide Petrella; Edoardo D'Erme	Petrella; D'Erme; Dario Faini; Gaetano Scognamiglio	Dardust	3:49
3.	"Tra le lune e le dune"	Jacopo Ettorre	Ettorre; Faini; Nicola Lazzarin	Dardust; Cripo	3:06
4.	"Carillon"	Francesco D'Agostino	Joe Viegas; Vincenzo Centrella	Kyv	3:05
5.	"Corpi celesti"	Alex Andrea Vella	Federica Abbate; Lazzarin	Cripo; Enrico Brun	3:21
6.	"Paradossale"	Tommaso Santoni; Daniele Fossatelli	Santoni; Fossatelli; Marco Paganelli	Marco Paganelli	3:08
7.	"Rifare tutto"	Adel Al Kassem	Michele Poli; Alberto Sterza	Mike Defunto; Sterza	2:42
8.	"Sabbie mobili"	Elisa Mariotti	Mariotti; Simone Privitera	Simon Says!	2:39
9.	"L'unica"	Alessandro La Cava; Abbate	Francesco Catitti; Nicola Lazzarin	Cripo; Katoo	3:10
10.	"Odio corrisposto"	D'Agostino; Santoni; Carlo Aprea	Santoni; Centrella	Kyv	3:02
11.	"Niente di male"	Sara Mattei; La Cava; Abbate	Lazzarin; Jacopo Pio Porporino	Cripo	3:37
12.	"La cura per me" (featuring Blanco)	Todrani; Fabbriconi; Zocca	Fabbriconi; Zocca	Michelangelo	3:35
Total length:					38:54

== Commercial success ==
The album debuted at number one on the FIMI Albums Chart, becoming the artist's seventh project to achieve this result and the first since Senza paura, released in 2013.

== Charts ==
Chart performance for G
Chart (2025)	Peak position
Italian Albums (FIMI)	1

== Certifications ==
Certifications for "G"
Region	Certification	Certified units/sales
Italy (FIMI)	Gold	25,000^{‡}
^{‡} Sales+streaming figures based on certification alone.
