= Sanremo Music Festival 1995 =

Italian song contest (45th edition)

Dates and venue
- Semi-final 1: 21 February 1995
- Semi-final 2: 22 February 1995
- Semi-final 3: 23 February 1995
- Semi-final 4: 24 February 1995
- Final: 25 February 1995
- Venue: Teatro Ariston; Sanremo, Italy

Organisation
- Broadcaster: Radiotelevisione italiana (RAI)
- Musical director: Pippo Caruso
- Artistic director: Pippo Baudo
- Presenters: Pippo Baudo and Anna Falchi, Claudia Koll

Big Artists section
- Number of entries: 23
- Winner: "Come saprei" Giorgia

Newcomers' section
- Number of entries: 16
- Winner: "Le ragazze" Neri per Caso

The Sanremo Music Festival 1995 (Italian: Festival di Sanremo 1995), officially the 45th Italian Song Festival (45º Festival della canzone italiana), was the 45th annual Sanremo Music Festival, held at the Teatro Ariston in Sanremo in late February 1995 and broadcast by Radiotelevisione italiana (RAI). The show was presented by Pippo Baudo, who also served as the artistic director, with actresses Anna Falchi and Claudia Koll.

The winner of the Big Artists section was Giorgia with the song "Come saprei", which also won the Critics Award. The a cappella group Neri per Caso won the Newcomers section with the song "Le ragazze".

On the opening night, shortly after the beginning of the show, a man, Pino Pagano, sat on the edge of the gallery of the theater and showed the intention to commit suicide jumping below, shouting "Pippo, io mi butto" (Italian for "Pippo, I'm jumping"): he was eventually stopped by Baudo himself amid the applause of the audience.

After every night Rai 1 broadcast DopoFestival, a talk show about the festival with the participation of singers and journalists. It was hosted by Serena Dandini with Luciano De Crescenzo, Fabio Fazio, Gianni Ippoliti and Pippo Baudo.

== Participants and results ==
=== Big Artists ===
Big Artists section
Song	Artist(s)	Songwriter(s)	Rank
"Come saprei"	Giorgia	Giorgia Todrani; Eros Ramazzotti; Vladimiro Tosetto; Adelio Cogliati	1 / Mia Martini Critics Award / Radio/TV Prize
"In amore"	Gianni Morandi & Barbara Cola	Duchesca; Bruno Zambrini	2
"Gente come noi"	Spagna	Ivana & Giorgio Spagna; Fio Zanotti; Angelo Valsiglio; Marco Marati	3
"Con te partirò"	Andrea Bocelli	Lucio Quarantotto; Francesco Sartori	4
"Finalmente tu"	Fiorello	Max Pezzali; Mauro Repetto	5
"Bisogno d'amore"	Danilo Amerio	Danilo Amerio	6
"Rivoglio la mia vita"	Lighea	Zenonazza; Tania Montelpare; Michele Pecora	7
"Senza averti qui"	883	Max Pezzali; Pier Paolo Peroni; Marco Guarnerio	8
"Più di così"	Antonella Arancio	Fabrizio Carraresi; Franco Migliacci; Luca Bechelli; Mauro Goldsand	9
"Un altro amore no"	Lorella Cuccarini	Vincenzo Incenzo; Davide Pinelli; Silvio Testi	10
"Dove vai"	Mango	Armando Mango; Saverio Grandi; Pino Mango	11 / Fonopoli for Best Arrangement Award
"L'assurdo mestiere"	Giorgio Faletti	Giorgio Faletti	12
"Ma che ne sai… (se non hai fatto il piano-bar)"	Peppino di Capri, Gigi Proietti & Stefano Palatresi	Claudio Mattone	13
"Giovane vecchio cuore"	Gigliola Cinquetti	Giorgio Faletti	14
"La vestaglia"	Massimo Ranieri	Marcello Marrocchi; Giampiero Artegiani	15
"Voglio una donna"	Drupi	Toto Cutugno; Claudio Farina e Antonio Sanarico	16
"Voglio andare a vivere in campagna"	Toto Cutugno	Toto Cutugno	17
"Troppo sole"	Sabina Guzzanti & La Riserva Indiana	David Riondino	18
"ANGELI & angeli"	Loredana Bertè	Loredana Bertè; Philippe Leon	19
"I giorni dell’armonia"	Patty Pravo	Maurizio Monti; Giovanni Ullu	20
"Amore e guerra"	Francesca Schiavo	Sergio Cammariere; Roberto Kunstler	Eliminated
"È con te"	Valeria Visconti	Carlo Marrale	Eliminated
"Padre e padrone"	Giò Di Tonno	Giò Di Tonno; Alessandro Di Zio	Eliminated

=== Newcomers ===
Newcomers section
Song	Artist(s)	Songwriter(s)	Rank
"Le ragazze"	Neri per Caso	Claudio Mattone	1
"Che sarà di me"	Massimo Di Cataldo	Vincenzo Incenzo; Laurex; Massimo Di Cataldo	2
"Lo specchio dei pensieri"	Gigi Finizio	Gigi Finizio; Vincenzo Capasso	3
"Un posto al sole"	Rossella Marcone	Maurizio Morante	4
"Ho bisogno di te"	Dhamm	Alessio Ventura; Massimo Conti; Dario Benedetti; Mauro Munzi	5
"Destinazione Paradiso"	Gianluca Grignani	Gianluca Grignani	6
"Sentimento"	Raffaella Cavalli	Marco Marati; Angelo Valsiglio	7
"Le foglie"	Fedele Boccassini	Fedele Boccassini	8
"Dentro di me"	Mara	Massimo Riva; Davide Civaschi	9
"L'uomo col megafono"	Daniele Silvestri	Daniele Silvestri	10
"Chi più ne ha"	Prefisso	Francesco Ciccarelli; Luciano Favarin; Stefano Bonci; Rudy Neri	Eliminated
"Le cose di ieri"	Rock Galileo	Saverio Lanza	Eliminated
"Le voci di dentro"	Gloria	Giovanni Nuti; Celso Valli; Paolo Recalcati	Eliminated / Mia Martini Critics Award
"Monica"	Deco	Marco Bruni	Eliminated
"Per amore"	Flavia Astolfi	Mariella Nava	Eliminated
"Quando saprai"	Fabrizio Consoli	Fabrizio Consoli; Eugenio Finardi	Eliminated

== Guests ==
Guests
Artist(s)	Song(s)
Juan Luis Guerra	"La cosquillita"
Ray Charles	"Angelina"
Youssou N'Dour	"Undecided"
Take That	"Sure"
Madonna & Babyface	"Take a Bow"
Khaled	"Didi"
Cyndi Lauper	"Hey Now"
Gilbert Bécaud, Amii Stewart & Randy Crawford	"September Morn" / "September matin"
Noa	"Child Of Man"
Annie Lennox	"No More I Love You's"
Chris Isaak	"Wicked Game"
Robbie Robertson	"Ghost Dance"
Duran Duran	"White Lines"
Loreena McKennitt	"The Bonny Swans"
Sting	"The Cowboy Song"
