= Come Thelma & Louise =

Studio album by Giorgia
- Released: May 20, 1995
- Genres: Pop; R&B; soul
- Length: 45:56
- Label: BMG
- Producers: Celso Valli; Michele Torpedine

Giorgia chronology
Giorgia (1994)	Come Thelma & Louise (1995)	Strano il mio destino (Live & studio 95/96) (1996)

Singles from Come Thelma & Louise
- 1. "Come saprei" Released: 24 February 1995

Come Thelma & Louise (transl. Like Thelma & Louise) is the second studio album by Italian singer Giorgia, released on 19 April 1995 by Bertelsmann Music Group. The album features the single "Come saprei", written by the singer herself with Eros Ramazzotti, Adelio Cogliati and Vladi Tosetto, which won the Sanremo Music Festival 1995.

This album sold more than 8 million copies worldwide of which 400,000 copies in Italy alone, where it was certified triple platinum and resulted the best-selling album by a female artist in 1995, along with Siamo in due by Spagna.

== Background ==
Giorgia's second studio album is characterised by lighter lyrics for the most part, but with musical and vocal arrangements worthy of the best voices in the world. The album contains "Come saprei", a song with which Giorgia won the Sanremo Music Festival 1995. Apart from her grand success with this track, the album also had great success with the singles "Riguarda noi", "C'è da fare" and E c'è ancora mare. It is noted for its difficult vocals and her cover of "I've Got the Music in Me", which in the Italian version became "Non c'è che musica in me".

== Track listing ==
No.	Title	Writer(s)	Length
1.	"C'è da fare"	Gatto Panceri; Celso Valli	4:41
2.	"Riguarda noi"	Panceri; Valli	4:33
3.	"E c'è ancora mare"	Valli; Enzo Avitabile	4:54
4.	"Come Thelma e Louise"	Daniela Colace; Michele Ascolese	3:59
5.	"Di che segno sei"	Gino Paoli; Paola Penzo; Marco Prati; Valli	4:23
6.	"B.B.B. (La leggendaria storia del bacio)"	Panceri; Valli	4:33
7.	"Come saprei"	Giorgia Todrani; Eros Ramazzotti; Adelio Cogliati; Vladimiro Tosetto	4:59
8.	"Ogni donna"	Panceri; Valli	4:52
9.	"Questo amore"	Panceri; Valli	3:54
10.	"Non c'è che musica in me (cover fatta così)"	Tony Stephen Boshell; Panceri	5:08

== Personnel ==
- Giorgia – lead vocals, backing vocals, vocal arrangement
- Alfredo Golino – drums
- Celso Valli – piano, keyboards, Hammond organ
- Paolo Valli – drums, percussion
- Paolo Gianolio – bass, electric guitar, acoustic guitar, programming
- Luca Bignardi – programming
- Emanuela Cortesi, Antonella Pepe, Silvio Pozzoli – backing vocals

== Charts ==
Chart (1995)	Peak position
Italy (Classifica FIMI Artisti)	2
Switzerland (Swiss Hitparade)	46
