= Strano il mio destino (Live & studio 95/96) =

Studio album / live by Giorgia
- Released: February 19, 1996
- Genre: R&B; pop
- Length: 39:20
- Label: BMG
- Producer: Michele Torpedine; Celso Valli

Giorgia chronology
Come Thelma & Louise (1995)	Strano il mio destino (Live & studio 95/96) (1996)	Mangio troppa cioccolata (1997)

Singles from Strano il mio destino
- 1. "Strano il mio destino" Released: 24 February 1996

Strano il mio destino (Live & studio 95/96) is the first studio/live album by Italian singer Giorgia. As the title indicates, the album is composed of a mix of live tracks, recorded on her Tour Teatrale during her Rome leg in 1995, as well as studio version recorded tracks. The album was released by BMG label on 19 February 1996, directly after her third consecutive appearance at the Sanremo, competing with the title track "Strano il mio destino" and placing third at the final rank.

== Development ==
Opening the album is the title track Strano il mio destino, written by Giorgia together with the famous Italian lyricist Maurizio Fabrizio. The album's was produced entirely by "La Coccinella s.r.l." (which would later become "Dischi di Cioccolata s.r.l."). The final track contains a remix of E c'è ancora mare, one of the most well known of Giorgia's songs (together with Come saprei from her previous album "Come Thelma & Louise"), which was created in the studio, and was produced and arranged by Celso Valli with the artistic production of Michele Torpedine. This remix was described as a "Pulp Beat Version", where the term "pulp" actually refers to the recording studio where it was made, and not as a new genre of music as is widely believed.

The remaining five songs composing the central tracks of the album, originate from her concerts during her concert tour of Italy in 1995. At this point in her career Giorgia had become even more well-known. She had sung with Luciano Pavarotti on his album Pavarotti and friends, and also sang at the concert held in the Vatican, which included Pope John Paul II in the audience. She also released a single, "Vivo per lei" with Andrea Bocelli, who had also sung at the San Remo festival, winning the New Artists category, the same year as Giorgia had sung with her hit "E poi".

Giorgia was involved in the composition and vocal arrangements of the tracks, entering a more mature phase of her career, thanks to the initial encouragement of Pino Daniele, which she would continue into her following album Mangio Troppo Cioccolata.

== Track listing ==
No.	Title	Writer(s)	Length
1.	"Strano il mio destino"	Giorgia Todrani; Maurizio Fabrizio	4:15
2.	"Senza segreti / Nasceremo" (Live)	Todrani; Marco Rinalduzzi; Massimo Calabrese	4:55
3.	"Endless Love" (Live; featuring Michael Baker and Olivia McClurkin)	Lionel Richie	7:40
4.	"Nessun dolore" (Live)	Lucio Battisti; Giulio Rapetti Mogol	3:53
5.	"E poi" (Live)	Todrani; Rinalduzzi; Calabrese	5:43
6.	"You Don't Know What Love Is" (Live)	Donald MacRae Wilhoite Jr.; Gene Vincent de Paul	7:57
7.	"E c'è ancora mare"	Celso Valli; Enzo Avitabile	4:57

== Personnel ==
- Giorgia – vocals tracks 1–7; vocal arrangement tracks 1–6
- Massimo Carpani – sound recording track 1 at Studi Fonoprint, Bologna
- Luca Bignardi – recording, mixing track 1, recording vocal track 7 @ Studi Fonoprint, Bologna
- Alfredo Golino – drums track 1
- Cesare Chiodo – bass track 1
- Luca Orioli – sound programming and computer track 1
- Celso Valli – acoustic piano, keyboards track 1; production, arrangements tracks 1 and 7
- Michele Torpedine – artistic production track 1 and 7; manager tracks 2–6
- La Coccinella s.r.l. – production tracks 1–7
- Luca Cersosimo, Enrico La Falce – remix track 7 at Multiart Centre «Pulp» Studio, Milan
- D'Alessandro & Galli – live tour production 1995
- Michael Baker – rums, vocals tracks 2–6 (duet in track 3)
- Rickey Minor – bass, musical direction tracks 2–6
- Vernon «Ice» Black – electric guitar, folk guitar tracks 2–6
- Mark Swenson – Acoustic guitar tracks 1, 4–5 Guitar arrangements
- Fabrizio Capecchi/Fabio Canzian/ electric guitar
- James Raymond – keyboards tracks 2–6
- Rosario Giuliani – alto sax track 6
- Pattie Howard, Angela Baggi – backing vocals
- Olivia McClurkin – backing vocals tracks 2, 4–6 and vocals track 3
- John Ryan – sound technician tracks 2–6 from FOH L&R
- Serse Man – editing and mastering
- Stefano Steo Zacchi for Showbiz Arts & Graphics, Bologna – artistic direction and design
- Laura Camia – photography
- Steve – live photography
- Maria Laura Antonelli – photography (back cover)
- Luciano Squeo – makeup
- Rino Balducci – hair

== Charts ==
Charts (1996)	Peak position
Italy (Classifica FIMI Artisti)	2
