= WFUV: City Folk Live VII =

Compilation album by Various Artists
- Released: November 9, 2004
- Genre: Folk
- Label: WFUV

WFUV: City Folk Live VII is a compilation album released by WFUV (90.7 FM in New York City) in November 2004 to highlight songs performed live in the studio by some of the year's favorite guests. Money raised from the album supported WFUV, Fordham University's non-commercial radio station, with studios on campus and its 50,000-watt transmitter atop nearby Montefiore Medical Center.

== Track listing ==
1. Edie Brickell – "Take a Walk"
2. Fountains of Wayne – "Hackensack"
3. The Thrills – "Santa Cruz"
4. Steve Forbert – "Pretend Song"
5. Old 97's – "Won't Be Home"
6. The Dixie Hummingbirds – "Someday"
7. Emmylou Harris – "Can You Hear Me Now"
8. Rachael Yamagata – "Worn Me Down"
9. The Damnwells – "I Will Keep the Bad Things From You"
10. Willy Mason – "Oxygen"
11. Suzanne Vega – "Penitent"
12. Ani DiFranco – "Bliss Like This"
13. Rufus Wainwright – "Beauty Mark" (performed live in the studio on September 3, 2004)
14. The Bad Plus – "And Here We Test Our Powers of Observation"
15. Rickie Lee Jones – "Mink Coat at the Bus Stop"
16. Ricky Fanté – "I Let You Go"
17. Jamie Cullum – "Twentysomething"
18. Mocean Worker – "Right Now"
19. Joss Stone – "Super Duper Love"
