= Inevitabile =

Single by Giorgia and Eros Ramazzotti

from the album Dietro le apparenze
- Language: Italian
- Released: 18 November 2011
- Recorded: 2011
- Genre: R&B
- Length: 3:54
- Label: Dischi di cioccolata; Sony Music
- Songwriters: Eros Ramazzotti; Adelio Cogliati; Luca Chiaravalli
- Producers: Giorgia; Michele Canova

Giorgia singles chronology
"È l'amore che conta" (2011)	"Inevitabile" (2011)	"Dove sei" (2011)

Eros Ramazzotti singles chronology
"Appunti e note" (2010)	"Inevitabile" (2011)	"Un angelo disteso al sole" (2012)

Music video
- "Inevitabile" on YouTube

"Inevitabile" is a song recorded by Italian singers Giorgia and Eros Ramazzotti. The song was released on 18 November 2011 as the third single from Giorgia's eighth studio album Dietro le apparenze through Dischi di cioccolata and Sony Music.

The song was also included on Ramazzotti's greatest hits album Eros Best Love Songs.

== Composition ==
The song was written by Eros Ramazzotti and produced by Michele Canova and Giorgia. The song is the second one that Ramazzotti has written for Giorga after "Come saprei".

== Reception ==
Rockol described the collaboration as "a well executed song, easy and pleasant", stating that it could have a "more modern and less pop style, avoiding the choruses and making the voices of both singers intertwine more".

== Charts ==
=== Weekly charts ===
Chart (2012)	Peak position
Belgium (Ultratip Bubbling Under Flanders)	9
Belgium (Ultratip Bubbling Under Wallonia)	46
Croatia International Airplay (HRT)	5
Italy (FIMI)	9
Italy Airplay (EarOne)	2

=== Year-end charts ===
Chart (2012)	Position
Italy (FIMI)	84

== Certifications ==
Certifications for "Inevitabile"
Region	Certification	Certified units/sales
Italy (FIMI)	Platinum	30,000^{*}
^{*} Sales figures based on certification alone.
