= Scordato =

2023 comedy-drama film

- Directed by: Rocco Papaleo
- Screenplay by: Rocco Papaleo; Walter Lupo
- Starring: Rocco Papaleo; Giorgia; Simone Corbisiero; Angela Curri; Anna Ferraioli Ravel; Manola Rotunno; Eugenia Tamburri; Marco Trotta; Antonio Petrocelli; Giuseppe Ragone; Jerry Potenza; Elisa Gallo; Iacopo Vellardi
- Cinematography: Simone D'Onofrio
- Edited by: Mirko Platania
- Music by: Michele Braga
- Release date: 2023
- Language: Italian

Scordato (a pun on the Italian word that means both 'forgotten' and, when applied to a musical instrument, 'out of tune') is a 2023 Italian comedy-drama film directed by Rocco Papaleo.

== Plot ==
Orlando, a 60-year-old piano tuner living in Salerno, sleepwalks through an apathetic life weighed down by chronic back pain. His monotonous existence starts to change when physiotherapist Olga reveals that his physical torment is actually a mental 'contracture' rooted deep within his unhealed trauma—and that she needs a photograph from his youth to help him. Having fled his hometown Lauria years ago to bury his former life, Orlando is forced to return in order to get the picture. Accompanying him on the journey is a spectral companion: a younger version of himself visible and audible only to him, with whom Orlando shares a tense relationship. Upon arrival, the trip spirals into a profound, haunting reckoning. Among familiar streets and long-buried memories, Orlando must confront the pivotal events that made him the 'contracted' man he is today. Ultimately, his younger self becomes the key to helping him embrace his past.

== Cast ==
- Rocco Papaleo as Orlando Bevilacqua
- Simone Corbisiero as young Orlando
- Giorgia as Olga Santopadre
- Anna Ferraioli Ravel as Ottavia
- Angela Curri as Rosanna
- Giovanni Andriuoli as vice mayor Castelluccio
- Antonio Petrocelli as professor Deodato
- Giuseppe Ragone as Filippo Santarsiero
- Marco Trotta as Agostino Di Fazio
- Manola Rotunno as Giacomina
- Jerry Potenza as Rocchino

== Production ==
Principal photography started in September 2021. The film was mainly shot in Lauria and Maratea. Other locations included Salerno and the Monte Cotugno dam in Senise. The film marked the acting debut of pop singer Giorgia.

== Release ==
The film premiered at the 2023 Bari International Film Festival. It was released in Italian cinemas by Vision Distribution on 13 April 2023.
