= Adelmo e i suoi Sorapis =

Italian musical group

Adelmo e i suoi Sorapis is an Italian supergroup led by singer songwriter Zucchero Fornaciari. The group includes Maurizio Vandelli (former lead member of Equipe 84), Dodi Battaglia (member of Pooh), Umbi Maggi (former bass guitarist of Nomadi), Fio Zanotti (conductor and arranger) and Michele Torpedine (record producer).

The band formed in 1989, when they met in Cortina, at the foot of Sorapis mountain, all to be there on vacation. Since then they played together almost every year-end. They published their first and only album in 1993, Walzer d'un blues. The group then made a short tour to promote the album with dates in Milan, Rome and Bethlehem.

After several years of hiatus the group reunited in Sanremo Music Festival 2009, performing the song "Spiove il sole" together with Zucchero's daughter Irene Fornaciari.
