= Dedicated to the Moon =

Studio album by Ivana Spagna
- Released: 1987
- Recorded: 1986–87
- Studio: Simple Studios
- Genre: Italo disco; synth-pop
- Length: 44:42
- Label: CBS
- Producer: Theo Spagna, Larry Pignagnoli, Ivana Spagna

Ivana Spagna chronology
Dedicated to the Moon (1987)	You Are My Energy (1988)

Singles from Dedicated to the Moon
- 1. "Easy Lady" Released: 1986; 2. "Call Me" Released: March 1987; 3. "Dance, Dance, Dance" Released: 1987; 4. "Dedicated to the Moon" Released: 1987; 5. "Sarah" Released: 1987

Dedicated to the Moon is the debut album by Italian singer Spagna, released in 1987 the CBS record label. It featured the European hits "Easy Lady" and "Call Me".

== Overview ==
The singer's debut album, which was recorded mostly in the spring of 1987, contains songs sung in English. The singles "Easy Lady" and "Call Me" both became top 10 hits throughout Europe between 1986 and 1987. The songs "Dance Dance Dance", "Dedicated to the Moon" and "Sarah" were also released as singles in various territories. Dedicated to the Moon sold in excess of 500,000 copies.

In 2010, a remastered edition of the CD was released with 6 additional tracks.

== Track listing ==
All tracks are written by Ivana Spagna, Alfredo Pignagnoli and Giorgio Spagna.

Side one
No.	Title	Length
1.	"Call Me"	4:05
2.	"Sarah"	5:09
3.	"Dedicated to the Moon"	4:35
4.	"So Easy"	3:53
5.	"The Power of Money"	4:05

Side two
No.	Title	Length
6.	"Easy Lady"	4:50
7.	"Dance Dance Dance"	4:15
8.	"Why Can't I Say (I Love You Babe)"	4:52
9.	"Baby Blue"	4:43
10.	"Girl, It's Not the End of the World"	4:15
Total length:		44:42

2010 expanded edition bonus tracks
No.	Title	Length
11.	"Easy Lady" (extended version)	6:57
12.	"Jealousy"	3:58
13.	"Call Me" (Special Viva mix)	5:43
14.	"Every Girl and Boy" (Special Bang Bang remix)	5:19
15.	"Don't Call It Love"	4:22
16.	"Every Girl and Boy" (7″ version)	3:40
Total length:		74:41

== Charts ==
Chart performance for Dedicated to the Moon
Chart (1987)	Peak position
Finnish Albums (Suomen virallinen lista)	4
Swedish Albums (Sverigetopplistan)	38
Swiss Albums (Schweizer Hitparade)	18

== Sales and certifications ==
Certifications for Dedicated to the Moon
Region	Certification	Certified units/sales
Finland (Musiikkituottajat)	Gold	28,032
