= Ivana Spagna =

Italian singer and songwriter

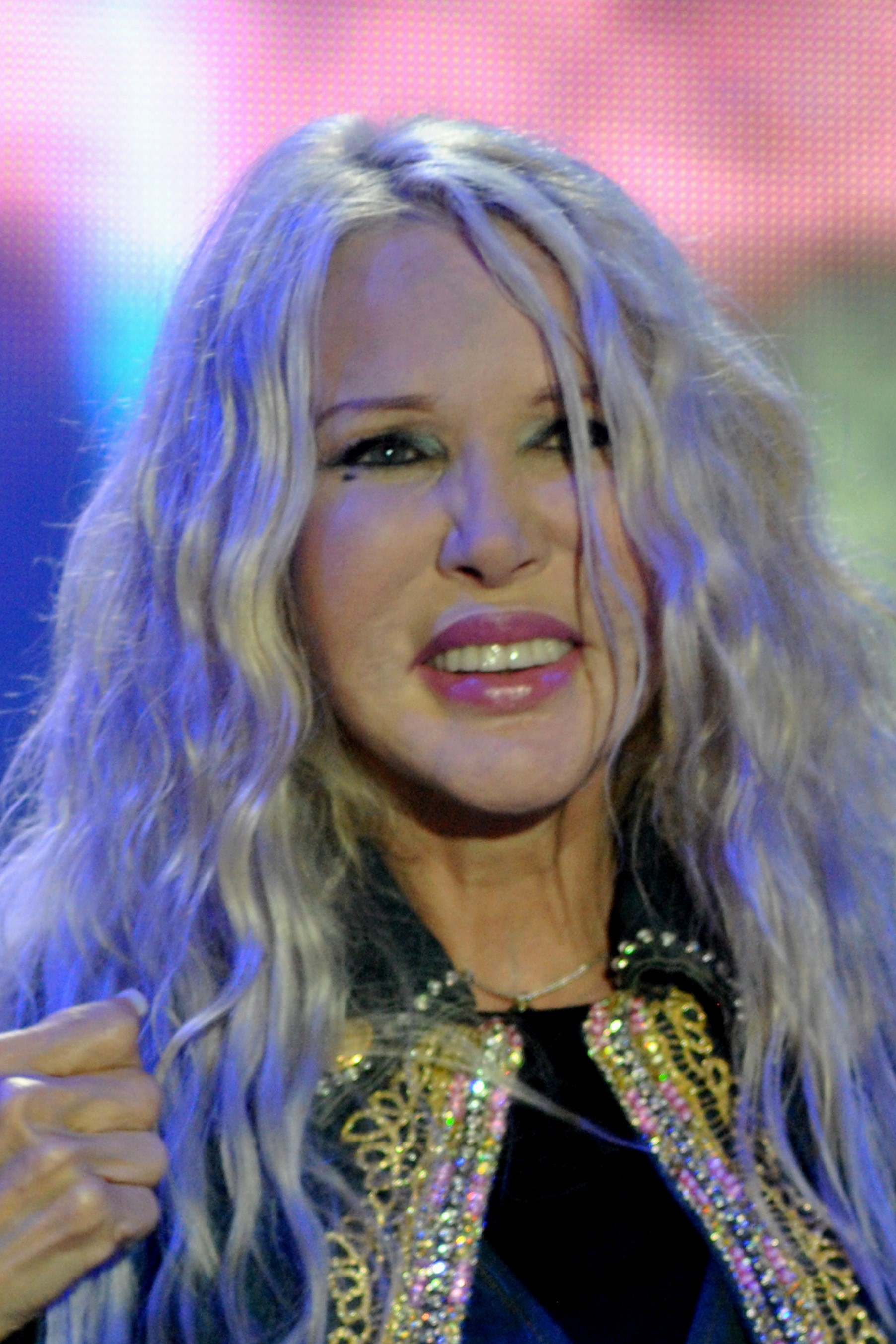
- Spagna performing in July 2016
- Born: 16 December 1954 (age 71); Valeggio sul Mincio, Italy
- Other name: Spagna
- Occupations: Singer; songwriter
- Years active: 1971–present
- Musical career
- Genres: Pop; Italo disco
- Instrument: Vocals
- Works: Ivana Spagna discography
- Labels: CBS; Sony
- Website: ivanaspagna.it

Ivana Spagna (Italian: [iˈvaːna ˈspaɲɲa]; born 16 December 1954), originally known simply as Spagna, is an Italian singer and songwriter. She is best known for her worldwide hit song "Call Me", released in 1987.

== Career ==
Ivana Spagna started her singing career in the early 1970s when she released the first Italian version of "Mamy Blue" in 1971 under her full name, then the following year, she released the single "Ari Ari". In the early 1980s, she provided vocals (with Angela Parisi) and wrote songs for the Italo disco duo Fun Fun; as well as writing songs and singing for many other dance music projects like Baby's Gang until 1986, when she embarked on a solo career. During this time, she also released two singles (in 1983 and 1985) under the alias Yvonne Kay, the first a cover of the Kiki Dee Band's "I've Got the Music in Me".

Spagna's 1986 single "Easy Lady" was a success across Europe. In 1987, she released "Call Me", which topped the European Hot 100 Singles chart, and reached number two in Italy and on the UK Singles Chart. It also reached number 13 on the US Hot Dance Club Play chart. Her debut album, Dedicated to the Moon, was released the same year and sold over 500,000 copies.

After the UK hit "Every Girl and Boy" and a dance-rock album, You Are My Energy (1988), Spagna moved to Santa Monica, California, and recorded her third album No Way Out (1991). This album featured a song written by Diane Warren ("There's a Love"), and two singles ("Love at First Sight" and "Only Words") which peaked at No. 5 on the Italian chart. The album was certified platinum (over 100,000 copies sold).

In 1993, Spagna moved back to Europe, and recorded Matter of Time, featuring the two successful Eurodance singles, "Why Me" (number 10 in Italy) and "I Always Dream About You" (number five in Italy).

In 1995, after the release of "Lady Madonna" (number four in Italy), Spagna started singing in her native Italian. After achieving great success in Italy with the Italian version of Elton John's "Circle of Life" ("Il cerchio della vita"), featured in the Italian soundtrack of the Disney film The Lion King, she took part in the Sanremo Music Festival 1995, ranking 3rd with the song "Gente come noi". Her first album in Italian, Siamo in due, sold over 400,000 copies and became the best-selling album by a female singer in Italy that year, along with Come Thelma & Louise by Giorgia.

From that year onwards, Spagna released many successful albums sung in Italian (including hit singles such as "Siamo in due", "E io penso a te", "Lupi solitari", "Indivisibili", "Dov'eri", "Il bello della vita-World Cup Song", "Con il tuo nome") until 2003, when she left Sony Music in order to sing in English again. She signed to an independent Swiss record label (B&G), and recorded Woman, a dance-pop album featuring eight new songs in English, two in Spanish and one in French. The album spawned three singles; "Never Say You Love Me", "Woman" and "Do It with Style". In 2004, a new remixed version of "Easy Lady" was released.

Spagna's albums and singles have sold a total of over 15 million copies worldwide, for which she has been awarded the "Disco d'oro alla carriera" (gold certification for the career) by the Italian Federation of the Music Industry (FIMI) in 2006. In February 2006, she took part in the Sanremo Festival again, with the song "Noi non possiamo cambiare", and in May 2006 ranked third in the Italian reality television program, Music Farm.

In 2008, Spagna was honoured with a honoris causas degree by the University of Malta.

In February 2009, she released the EP Lola & Angiolina Project, in collaboration with the Italian singer Loredana Bertè. The first single from this was the rock ballad "Comunque Vada".

In 2012, Spagna released the English-language album Four, featuring Brian Auger, Eumir Deodato, Dominic Miller, Lou Marini, Gregg Kofi Brown, Fabrizio Bosso and Ronnie Jones.

In 2014, Spagna returned to dance music, releasing the single "The Magic of Love" and then in 2015 two more singles: "Baby Don't Go" and "Straight to Hell", with a video inspired by The Curious Case of Benjamin Button.

In 2019, Spagna released "Cartagena", a pop song in collaboration with Jay Santos. The song sold 200,000 copies, her highest selling single since the late 1990s.
