= Giorgia (album) =

Studio album by Giorgia
- Released: June 8, 1994
- Genre: R&B; soul
- Length: 50:56
- Label: BMG; RCA
- Producer: Marco Rinalduzzi

Giorgia chronology
Giorgia (1994)	Come Thelma & Louise (1995)

Singles from Giorgia
- 1. "E poi" Released: 26 February 1994

Giorgia is the debut studio album by Italian singer-songwriter Giorgia, released on 8 June 1994 by Bertelsmann Music Group and RCA Italy.

== Background ==
Produced by Marco Rinalduzzi and Massimo Calabrese, Giorgia is the first official album by the prodigal Italian singer, Giorgia Todrani that contains 13 tracks: 9 original songs, a cover of Lucio Battisti's Nessun Dolore and two songs that she performed at Sanremo: Nasceremo, with which she won the contest Sanremo giovani in 1993; and E poi, the song that identifies her with the CD, performed at Sanremo in the Nuove Proposte section in 1994.

The album sold 170,000 copies in Italy and approximately 1 million worldwide, a remarkable achievement for a debut album, transforming Giorgia from an unknown but eminent talent, to one of the biggest names in Italian Pop. It includes the brief but intense song Alba, based on a poem written by Giorgia and the music of Marco Rinalduzzi and Massimo Calabrese.

The album is influenced by a black American type of music, mixed with the Italian style and the influence of Giorgia. At this time, Giorgia was starting to shape and create her experimental and perfectionistic style which characterised her career, becoming known as the style Clou which characterises music from that period and today.

The tracks have a mix of styles: Rhythm and Blues, Soul, Pop, Jazz and Rock, which at the time of its release was completely new and innovative in Italy. At just over 20 years old, Giorgia penned almost all of the lyrics (except for the cover of Nessun dolore). She took on themes such as the fear of living alone in E poi and Silenzioso amore, the difficulty in growing and maturing in the best way in society in Tuttinpiedi, Vorrei and M'hanno bocciato. In the track Stai (bimbo di domani) she converses with her future son about the world and what it will be like to live in it then. In addition, she covers other social and sentimental themes. The wide range of topics and musical texture resulted in a debut album with many artistic undertones; musically, vocally and lyrically, and remains the preferred album of many of Giorgia's fans.

Rereleased in 2005, to celebrate Giorgia's 10th anniversary, it reached the number two position on the Italian charts, resulting in the achievement of all of her albums having made the Top 10 in Italy.

== Track listing ==
Giorgia – Track listing
No.	Title	Writer(s)	Length
1.	"Stai (bimbo di domani)"	Giorgia Todrani; Stephen Clisby	4:20
2.	"Nasceremo"	Todrani; Massimo Calaberese; Marco Rinalduzzi	5:12
3.	"Puoi (fidati di te)"	Todrani; Calabrese; Rinalduzzi	4:17
4.	"Senza segreti"	Todrani; Calabrese; Rinalduzzi	3:42
5.	"Father"	Todrani; Calabrese; Rinalduzzi	5:16
6.	"Tutti in piedi"	Todrani; Calabrese; Rinalduzzi	4:06
7.	"E poi"	Todrani; Calabrese; Rinalduzzi	4:29
8.	"Uomo nero"	Todrani; Fabio Sinigaglia; Calabrese; Rinalduzzi	4:19
9.	"Silenzioso amore"	Todrani; Massimo Zuccaroli	3:51
10.	"M'hanno bocciato"	Todrani; Calabrese; Rinalduzzi	4:12
11.	"Vorrei"	Todrani; Calabrese; Rinalduzzi	4:31
12.	"Alba"	Todrani	1:49
13.	"Nessun dolore" (originally performed by Lucio Battisti)	Lucio Battisti; Giulio Rapetti Mogol	4:28

== Personnel ==
- Giorgia – vocals
- Massimo Calabrese – bass, backup vocals
- Alberto Bartoli – drums, percussion, tambourine, backup vocals
- Maria Grazia Fontana – Hammond organ, backup vocals
- Salvatore Corazza – drums
- Marco Rinalduzzi – acoustic guitar, electric guitar, classical guitar, keyboard, piano, backup vocals
- Fabio Pignatelli – bass
- Derek Wilson – drums
- Pino Favale – trumpet
- Pasquale Schembri – trumpet, backup vocals
- Alfredo Posillipo – trombone, backup vocals
- Franco Marinacci – baritone saxophone
- Ferruccio Corsi – contralto saxophone, tenor saxophone, soprano saxophone
- Claudia Arvati, Lilla Costarelli, Marco D'Angelo, Gloria Fegiz, Martino Fabrizio, Susanna Stivali, Tosca, Massimo Zuccaroli, Giulio Todrani, Charlie Cannon – backup vocals
