= Il mio giorno migliore =

Single by Giorgia

from the album Dietro le apparenze
- Language: Italian
- Released: 12 June 2011
- Genre: Dance pop; electropop; Eurodance
- Length: 3:40.
- Label: Sony Music
- Songwriters: Giorgia Todrani; Emanuel Lo Iacono
- Producers: Giorgia; Michele Canova

Giorgia singles chronology
"Salvami" (2009)	"Il mio giorno migliore" (2011)	"È l'amore che conta" (2011)

Music video
- "Il mio giorno migliore" on YouTube

"Il mio giorno migliore" is a song co-written, recorded and produced by Italian singer Giorgia. It was released on 12 June 2011 through Sony Music Italy, as the lead single from her eighth studio album Dietro le apparenze.

== Background and composition ==
After her seventh studio album Stonata (2007), Giorgia took a discography break and changed her management team; in 2010 she also gave birth of their first child with her fiancé Emanuel Lo. In May 2011 Giorgia announced her eighth studio album.

On June 8, 2011, the singer announced "Il mio giorno migliore" as the lead single from the new recording project. The song was written by Giorgia herself with her fiancée Emanuel Lo and produced by Michele Canova; Giorgia explained the meaning of the song:

"The song was born this way: rhythmic, jaunty, far from the ballads of the darker Giorgia. The best day is there for everyone, it is the day when the soul works, gives meaning to existing and reminds him why to do it. The soul is simple, it goes straight it has no doubts, it has experience and more it seeks to be itself. I searched for years for cleanliness, precision, perfect sound. Distracting myself from the primary function of singing: singing must also be liberating, a way of expressing oneself without thinking too much about it."

== Music video ==
The music video for the song, directed by Gaetano Morbioli, was released on July 16, 2011, through the singer's YouTube channel.

== Charts ==
Chart performance for "Il mio giorno migliore"
Chart (2016)	Peak position
Italy (FIMI)	6
Italy Airplay (EarOne)	2

== Certifications ==
Certifications for "Il mio giorno migliore"
Region	Certification	Certified units/sales
Italy (FIMI)	Platinum	30,000^{*}
^{*} Sales figures based on certification alone.
