= È l'amore che conta =

Single by Giorgia

from the album Dietro le apparenze
- Released: 9 September 2011
- Recorded: 2011
- Genre: Pop; R&B
- Length: 3:21
- Label: Sony; Dischi di cioccolata
- Songwriters: Giorgia Todrani; Michael James Ryan Busbee; Allan Rich; Jud Friedman
- Producers: Giorgia; Michele Canova

Giorgia singles chronology
"Il mio giorno migliore" (2011)	"È l'amore che conta" (2011)	"Inevitabile" (2011)

"È l'amore che conta" is a song co-written, recorded and produced by Italian singer Giorgia. It was released on 9 September 2011 through Sony Music as the second single from her eighth studio album Dietro le apparenze.

It peaked at number 9 on the Italian Top Digital Download chart, and it was certified platinum by the Federation of the Italian Music Industry for domestic sales exceeding 60,000 units.

== Music video ==
Shot in Venice, the video was made available for viewers on October 6, 2011 in a preview in corriere.it, and on YouTube on October 7, 2011.

== Covers ==
- The Ukrainian singer Ani Lorak released a cover in 2012 of the song, titled Obnimi menya krepce.
- The Dutch singer Glennis Grace released a cover in 2012 of the song, titled Ik ben niet van jou.

== Charts ==
Weekly chart performance for "È l'amore che conta"
Chart (2011)	Peak position
Italy (FIMI)	9

Annual chart rankings for "È l'amore che conta"
Chart (2011)	Rank
Italy (Musica e dischi)	32
