= Call Me (Spagna song) =

1987 single by Spagna

Single by Spagna

from the album Dedicated to the Moon
- B-side: "Girl, It's Not the End of the World"
- Released: March 1987
- Studio: Simple (Reggio Emilia, Italy)
- Genre: Italo disco
- Length: 4:05
- Label: CBS
- Songwriters: Ivana Spagna; Giorgio Spagna; Larry Pignagnoli
- Producers: Larry Pignagnoli; Theo Spagna

Spagna singles chronology
"Easy Lady" (1986)	"Call Me" (1987)	"Dance Dance Dance" (1987)

Audio video
- "Call Me" on YouTube

"Call Me" is a song by Italian singer Spagna, released in 1987 as the second single from her debut studio album, Dedicated to the Moon (1987). Unlike its predecessor, "Easy Lady", "Call Me" was also released in North America and Japan. A "U.S. remix" was done by Steve Thompson and Mike Barbiero. The single's B-side, "Girl, It's Not the End of the World", also appears on Spagna's debut album. The song became a worldwide hit, reaching number one in Spain and becoming a top-10 hit in 14 other countries. The music video for the song, directed by David Hillier, was filmed in and around Nottingham, England, particularly around the Ritzy nightclub, with the nearby Belvoir Castle also appearing.

== Commercial performance ==
"Call Me" reached number one in Spain while peaking at number two in Italy and the United Kingdom, as well as number three in Ireland. In France, the single debuted at number 40, before peaking at number four in its 10th week on the chart, and was certified silver by the Syndicat National de l'Édition Phonographique (SNEP) that same year. Elsewhere, "Call Me" charted within the top five in Finland and Norway, and the top 10 in Belgium, Sweden, Switzerland and West Germany. In the United States, the U.S. remix of the song reached number 13 on the Billboard Dance Club Play chart and number 18 on the 12-inch Singles Sales chart in 1988.

== Track listings ==
- 7-inch single

A. "Call Me" – 4:05
B. "Girl, It's Not the End of the World" – 4:15

- US and Canadian 7-inch single (U.S. remix)

A. "Call Me" (U.S. remix) – 4:05
B. "Girl, It's Not the End of the World" – 4:15

- 12-inch single

A. "Call Me" – 6:05
B. "Girl, It's Not the End of the World" – 5:05

- UK limited-edition 12-inch single

A. "Call Me" – 6:05
B1. "Easy Lady" (Move On Up mix) – 6:40
B2. "Girl, It's Not the End of the World" – 5:05

- UK 12-inch single (special Viva remix)

A1. "Call Me" (Viva mix) – 5:40
A2. "Girl, It's Not the End of the World" – 4:15
B1. "Call Me" (bonus track) – 3:45
B2. "Call Me" (instrumental) – 5:45

- 12-inch single (special remix)

A. "Call Me" (special remix) – 5:40
B1. "Call Me" (bonus track) – 3:45
B2. "Call Me" (instrumental) – 5:45

- Australian 12-inch single (special 12-inch U.S. mix)

A1. "Call Me" (Popstand remix) – 7:20
A2. "Call Me" (percapella) – 5:33
B1. "Call Me" (long distance dub) – 6:40
B2. "Call Me" (instrumental) – 5:42
B3. "Call Me" (original Euro 12″ mix) – 6:05

- Japanese 12-inch single

A1. "Call Me" (Popstand remix) – 7:23
A2. "Call Me" (percapella) – 5:32
B1. "Call Me" (long distance dub) – 6:47
B2. "Call Me" (instrumental) – 5:42

== Credits and personnel ==
- Spagna – vocals, vocal arrangements
- Larry Pignagnoli – production, arrangements
- Theo Spagna – production, arrangements
- Graziano Ferrari – photography
- Toni Contiero – artwork
- Recorded and mixed at Simple Studios (Reggio Emilia, Italy)

== Charts ==
=== Weekly charts ===
Weekly chart performance for "Call Me"
Chart (1987–1988)	Peak position
Australia (Kent Music Report)	98
Austria (Ö3 Austria Top 40)	12
Belgium (Ultratop 50 Flanders)	8
Denmark (IFPI)	2
Europe (European Hot 100 Singles)	2
Finland (Suomen virallinen lista)	5
France (SNEP)	4
Greece (IFPI)	2
Ireland (IRMA)	3
Italy (Musica e dischi)	2
Italy Airplay (Music & Media)	13
Luxembourg (Radio Luxembourg)	2
Netherlands (Dutch Top 40)	4
Netherlands (Single Top 100)	7
Norway (VG-lista)	4
South Africa (Springbok Radio)	6
Spain (AFYVE)	1
Sweden (Sverigetopplistan)	8
Switzerland (Schweizer Hitparade)	7
UK Singles (Official Charts)	2
UK Dance (Music Week)	4
US Dance Club Songs (Billboard) Remix	13
US Dance Singles Sales (Billboard) Remix	18
West Germany (GfK)	10

=== Year-end charts ===
Year-end chart performance for "Call Me"
Chart (1987)	Position
Belgium (Ultratop 50 Flanders)	39
Europe (European Hot 100 Singles)	3
Italy (Musica e dischi)	6
Netherlands (Dutch Top 40)	49
Netherlands (Single Top 100)	47
UK Singles (Gallup)	36
West Germany (Media Control)	50

== Certifications and sales ==
Certifications and sales for "Call Me"
Region	Certification	Certified units/sales
France (SNEP)	Silver	250,000^{*}
Spain (Promusicae)	Platinum	50,000^{^}
Summaries
Worldwide	—	1,400,000
^{*} Sales figures based on certification alone.^{^} Shipments figures based on certification alone.

== Release history ==
Release dates and formats for "Call Me"
Region	Date	Format(s)	Label(s)	Ref(s).
Europe	March 1987	7-inch vinyl; 12-inch vinyl	CBS	
United Kingdom	11 May 1987	7-inch vinyl; 12-inch vinyl	CBS	
United Kingdom	8 June 1987	Limited-edition 12-inch vinyl	CBS	
Japan	22 July 1987	7-inch vinyl; 12-inch vinyl	Epic International	
Japan	26 February 1988	7-inch vinyl (U.S. remix)	Epic International	

== Covers ==
"Call Me" was covered in 1988 by New Zealand band Aishah and the Fan Club, reaching number nine on the New Zealand Singles Chart.
