= Quando una stella muore =

Single by Giorgia

from the album Senza paura
- Language: Italian
- Released: 3 October 2013
- Recorded: 2013
- Genre: Pop soul
- Length: 3:23.
- Label: Sony Music
- Songwriters: Giorgia Todrani; Norma Jean Martine; Patrizio Moi
- Producer: Michele Canova

Giorgia singles chronology
"Tu mi porti su" (2012)	"Quando una stella muore" (2013)	"I Will Pray (Pregherò)" (2013)

Music video
- "Quando una stella muore" on YouTube

"Quando una stella muore" is a song co-written and recorded by Italian singer Giorgia. The song was released on 3 October 2013 through Sony Music Italy, as the lead single from her ninth studio album Senza paura.

== Background and composition ==
After her eighth studio album Dietro le apparenze, Giorgia worked on new music projects in Hollywood, Los Angeles and Milan with Italian record producer and songwriter Michele Canova and internetionals composers and writers. "Quando una stella muore" was written by the singer herself with Norma Jean Martine and Patrizio Moi.

== Music video ==
The music video for the song, directed by Gaetano Morbioli, was released on October 18, 2013, through the singer's YouTube channel. The video was filmed at Molina Falls National Park and the province of Modena, Italy.

== Charts ==
Chart performance for "Quando una stella muore"
Chart (2013)	Peak position
Italy (FIMI)	10
Italy Airplay (EarOne)	5

== Certifications ==
Certifications for "Quando una stella muore"
Region	Certification	Certified units/sales
Italy (FIMI)	Platinum	30,000^{‡}
^{‡} Sales+streaming figures based on certification alone.
