= Niente di male =

Single by Giorgia

from the album G
- Language: Italian
- Released: 18 October 2024
- Recorded: 2024
- Genre: Pop soul
- Length: 3:37
- Label: Epic; Sony Music
- Songwriters: Sara Mattei; Alessandro La Cava; Federica Abbate; Nicola Lazzarin; Jacopo Pio Porporino
- Producer: Cripo

Giorgia singles chronology
"Senza confine" (2023)	"Niente di male" (2024)	"La cura per me" (2025)

Music video
- "Niente di male" on YouTube

"Niente di male" is a song recorded by Italian singer-songwriter Giorgia. The song was released on 18 October 2024 through Epic and Sony Music as the lead single from her twelfth studio album, G.

== Composition ==
The song was written by Mara Sattei, Alessandro La Cava, Federica Abbate, Jacopo Pio Porporino, aka Jacopo Sol, and produced by Cripo. It marked the second artistic collaboration between Giorgia and Mara Sattei since the latter's song "Parentesi" published in 2022. The artist recounted the meaning of the song and its composition:

"It has not been easy to find my new notes, voice and inspiration that I needed, and this piece came as a new vibration. Change is life, and transforming, as difficult as it is sometimes, is necessary to truly discover oneself. "Niente di male" is the beginning of a new path, bringing us together, making us find each other or meet for the first time. I hope it also leads you on the right path, but without fear of going in the wrong direction, because after all, there is no harm"

== Critical reception ==
Alessandro Alicandri of TV Sorrisi e Canzoni stated that Sattei's stylistic imprint can be heard in the song, and that "one can feel the initial vibes of Oronero, but also that wonderful synthesis of classical and contemporary that we have already heard in the song Parentesi." Alicandri found gospel sonorities, believing that "there is no intention to create a ballad, but a song that from the interiority grows and becomes a joyful celebration". Andrea Conti of Il Fatto Quotidiano described the song as "a ballad and not a ballad that gives us a new Giorgia" appreciating that it "gives new nuances" of the singer.

== Music video ==
The music video, directed by Byron Rosero, was released on 21 October 2024 through the 'iorgias YouTube channel.

== Charts ==
Chart (2024)	Peak position
Italy (FIMI)	84
Italy Airplay (EarOne)	8
