= La cura per me =

Single by Giorgia

from the album G
- Language: Italian
- Released: 12 February 2025
- Genre: Pop; soul
- Length: 3:35
- Label: Sony; Epic
- Songwriters: Giorgia Todrani; Riccardo Fabbriconi; Michele Zocca
- Producer: Michelangelo

Giorgia singles chronology
| "Niente di male" (2024) | "La cura per me" (2025) | "L'unica" (2025) |

Music video
- "La cura per me" on YouTube

"La cura per me" ("The Treatment for Me") is a song co-written and recorded by Italian singer Giorgia. It was released on 12 February 2025 through Sony Music and Epic Records as the second single from her twelfth studio album G.

The song competed during the Sanremo Music Festival 2025, finishing in sixth position. It marked the singer's sixth participation on the main contest, previously participating with "Parole dette male" in 2023. With over 2 million copies sold worldwide, it was the best-selling single of 2025 by a female artist in Italy.

== Background and composition ==
After Giorgia comeback on the music scene with her eleventh record project Blu in 2023, promoted by the single "Parole dette male" presented in the competition at the 73rd Sanremo Festival, Giorgia released the single "Niente di male" in 2024, claiming to be working on new songs but without a definitive record project.

The song, written by Giorgia herself with Blanco and Michelangelo, was described by the singer in an interview with Il Fatto Quotidiano:

""La cura per me" is a song about a search through a very strong feeling, so also an awareness, of the strength of that feeling and also moments of fear, moments of deep loneliness. One has to focus on what one feels, what one feels, but with this final coda that leads to a transformation of that feeling, that is to hope. So to self-care. [...] I think the inner work that each of us can do is to become a better person and then it can be something that becomes a sea, if we all do it, if we spend a little more time thinking that we have maybe even a 'soul or a brain"

== Critical reception ==
"La cura per me" received favorable reviews from music critics.

Andrea Laffranchi of Corriere della Sera wrote that the sonorities of the melody "are the right terrain to highlight Giorgia's interpretative abilities", which remind one of those adopted by Lucio Dalla. Gianni Sibilla of Rockol associated the song with "Brividi" and "Due vite", describing it as "a ballad that starts off minimal piano and voice to enhance Giorgia's voice" that continues on a refrain that "allows her to fly, with a finale with a nice change of pace". Alvise Salerno of All Music Italia wrote that although Blanco's writing is "present and pressing", Giorgia "has such an identity and strength that she does not let the classic characteristics" of the songwriter prevail.

== Music video ==
The video for the song was released on 12 February 2025 on the singer's official YouTube channel. The video was directed by Martina Nardulli.

== Charts ==
=== Weekly charts ===
Weekly chart performance for "La cura per me"
| Chart (2025) | Peak position |
|---|---|
| Croatia International Airplay (Top lista) | 70 |
| Global 200 (Billboard) | 193 |
| Italy (FIMI) | 2 |
| Italy Airplay (EarOne) | 2 |
| Switzerland (Schweizer Hitparade) | 17 |

=== Year-end charts ===
Year-end chart performance for "La cura per me"
| Chart (2025) | Position |
|---|---|
| Italy (FIMI) | 2 |

== Certifications ==
Certifications for "La cura per me"
| Region | Certification | Certified units/sales |
|---|---|---|
| Italy (FIMI) | 2× Platinum | 400,000^{‡} |
^{‡} Sales+streaming figures based on certification alone.
