= Gocce di memoria =

Single by Giorgia

from the album Facing Windows and Ladra di vento
- B-side: "We've Got Tonight"
- Released: 20 March 2003
- Genre: Pop
- Label: BMG
- Songwriters: Giorgia Todrani; Andrea Guerra
- Producers: Andrea Guerra; Rocco Petruzzi

Giorgia singles chronology
"Vivi davvero" (2002)	"Gocce di memoria" (2003)	"Spirito libero" (2003)

Music video
- "Gocce di memoria" on YouTube

"Gocce di memoria" (Italian: [ˈɡottʃe di meˈmɔːrja]; transl. "Drops of memory") is a song written and recorded by Italian singer Giorgia. It was released on 20 March 2003 as a part of the official soundtrack of Ferzan Özpetek's film Facing Windows and later included on the singer's sixth studio album Ladra di vento.

An autobiographical song about the importance of memories, the only ones able to reconnect us with the people who have entered our lives and left a mark, it represents a tribute to singer Alex Baroni, Giorgia's partner until his 2002 death from a motorcycle accident. The song won the Nastro d'Argento award for Best Original Song, and three Italian Music Awards for Best Single, Best Composition and Best Arrangement.

== Track listing ==
No.	Title	Length
1.	"Gocce di memoria"	4:16
2.	"We've Got Tonight (duet with Ronan Keating)"	3:40

== Charts ==
Chart	Peak position
Italy (FIMI)	1
Italy Airplay (Nielsen Music Control)	3
Switzerland (Schweizer Hitparade)	70

=== Year-end charts ===
Chart (2003)	Peak position
Italy (FIMI)	1

== Certifications ==
Region	Certification	Certified units/sales
Italy 2003 sales	—	100,000
Italy (FIMI) From 2009	Gold	15,000^{‡}
^{‡} Sales+streaming figures based on certification alone.
