= Come saprei =

- cover of the Belgian single

Single by Giorgia

from the album Come Thelma & Louise
- Released: 24 February 1995
- Genre: Soul
- Label: Pelago
- Songwriters: Giorgia Todrani; Eros Ramazzotti; Vladimiro Tosetto; Adelio Cogliati

Music video
- "Come saprei" on YouTube

"Come saprei" (lit. 'How will I know?') is a song co-written and recorded by Italian singer Giorgia. It was released on 24 February 1995 as the lead single from her second studio album Come Thelma & Louise. It won the 45th edition of the Sanremo Music Festival.

== Background ==
The song was composed by Giorgia with Eros Ramazzotti, Vladimiro Tosetto and Adelio Cogliati and arranged by Celso Valli, who also conducted the orchestra during Giorgia's performances at the Sanremo Festival.

During each of the four nights of the festival, Giorgia performed the song in slightly but noticeable different ways. The song eventually won the festival, beating the pre-festival favourites Gianni Morandi and Fiorello, and was the first Sanremo entry to win both the main competition and the critics' award.

The song was never released as a physical single except for some foreign territories, but was the leading song of the album Come Thelma & Louise.

== Charts ==
=== Weekly charts ===
Chart (1995)	Peak position
Italy Airplay (Music & Media)	6

== Certifications ==
Region	Certification	Certified units/sales
Italy (FIMI) Since 2009	Gold	25,000^{‡}
^{‡} Sales+streaming figures based on certification alone.
