= I Will Pray (Pregherò) =

Single by Giorgia and Alicia Keys

from the album Senza paura
- Released: November 5, 2013
- Genre: Pop soul
- Length: 3:38
- Label: Microphonica; Sony Music
- Songwriters: Giorgia Todrani; Alicia Augello Cook; Andreas Romdhane; Josef Larossi; Viktoria Hansen; Ron Anderson (translation)
- Producers: Giorgia; Michele Canova

Giorgia singles chronology
"Quando una stella muore" (2013)	"I Will Pray (Pregherò)" (2013)	"Non mi ami" (2014)

Alicia Keys singles chronology
"Tears Always Win" (2013)	"I Will Pray (Pregherò)" (2013)	"It's On Again" (2014)

Lyric Video
- I Will Pray (Pregherò) on YouTube

"I Will Pray (Pregherò)" is a song written and recorded by Italian singer Giorgia and American singer Alicia Keys. The song was released on 6 November 2013 through Sony Music Italy, as the second single from Giorgia's ninth studio album Senza paura.

The song peaked at number 15 on the Italian singles chart and it was certified gold by the Federation of the Italian Music Industry.

== Background and composition ==
The song was originally wrote in Italian by Giorgia herself. During the recording of the album Senza paure, Giorgia decided to send the song to Alicia Keys for the pop soul and contemporary R&B sound of the music. Giorgia explained the decision to collaborate with Keys and the met artist:

"I tried [to send it to Alicia Keys], although I never thought it would work out. We sent her the piece, sung by me in Italian, and she took time to try to sing it. Months went by. Then surprisingly, when the record was practically finished, the response came. She had it translated, adapted, but then she wanted to sing phrases in Italian, which is even more surprising."

Giorgia has also recorded a solo version of the song, entitled "Pregherò", which is sung in Italian.

== Critics reception ==
Rockol appreciated the collaboration, writing that it is "a must-have gem for contemporary soul", appreciating Keys' willingness to "spiritually" enter the song by singing in Italian.

== Charts ==
Weekly charts
Chart (2014)	Peak
Italy (FIMI)	17

Year-end charts
Chart (2014)	Rank
Italy (Musica e dischi)	58

== Certifications ==
Region	Certification	Certified units/sales
Italy (FIMI)	Gold	15,000^{*}
^{*} Sales figures based on certification alone.
