= Ricky Fanté =

American musician (born 1970)

- Born: Ricky Andrew Fante; November 4, 1970 (age 55)
- Origin: Los Angeles, California, U.S.
- Genres: R&B, Neo soul, soul
- Occupations: Singer, sound engineer, songwriter
- Years active: 2002–present
- Label: Virgin/EMI Records (2002–2007)
- Website: Ricky Fanté's Official Website

Ricky Andrew Fanté (born November 4, 1970) is an American rhythm and blues singer, sound engineer, and songwriter.

== Career ==
After serving in the United States Marine Corps for a few years after high school, a demo of his two-man group, produced by his partner ex-rocker Scott Rickett called Soul Surfing, fell into the hands of A&R executive Josh Deutsch, which led to a development deal in 2001. In 2002, Fanté met with Norah Jones's collaborator Jesse Harris, and began co-writing and recording his debut record.

Fanté was then signed by Virgin Records and released Rewind in July 2004. Fanté gained critical acclaim for the song "It Ain’t Easy". He performed the single on NBC’s long-running late night talk and variety show The Tonight Show with Jay Leno. Although the song was not considered a hit, the album garnered moderate success in the U.S. and abroad. The song reached No. #8 on Italian music chart.

In 2005, Ricky Fanté recorded the title song "Shine" for the film Robots, and the upbeat tune "That’s All I Need" for the HBO film Lackawanna Blues. In the same year, he performed a duet with the Italian singer Giorgia Todrani for her MTV Unplugged.

In 2009, he recorded the theme song for the hit ABC television series Shark Tank, which was written by Berry Gordy and Janie Bradford. Afterward, he took a break from singing to return to school.

In 2015, he began work on a new album with Scott Rickett and Herman Matthews. In 2016, he released a collaborative album with Scott Rickett titled Good Fortune through their own independent label, Soul Surfer Records.

== Discography ==
=== Albums ===
- 2002: Soul Surfing (with Scott Rickett)
- 2004: Rewind
- 2016: Good Fortune (with Scott Rickett)

=== EPs ===
- 2003: Introducing... Ricky Fanté

=== Other appearances ===
- 2004: "I Let You Go (WFUV: City Folk Live VII)
- 2005: "Shine" (Robots Soundtrack)
- 2005: "That's All I Need" (Lackawanna Blues Soundtrack)
- 2005: "Love Won't Let Me Wait" (Yours, Mine and Ours Soundtrack)
- 2009: "Shark Tank Theme" (Shark Tank Soundtrack)
