= Easy Lady =

1986 single by Spagna

Single by Spagna

from the album Dedicated to the Moon
- B-side: "Jealousy"
- Released: 1986
- Recorded: 1986
- Genre: Eurodisco
- Length: 4:08
- Label: CBS
- Songwriters: Ivana Spagna; Larry Pignagnoli; Giorgio Spagna
- Producers: Larry Pignagnoli; Theo

Spagna singles chronology
"Rise Up (For My Love)" (1985)	"Easy Lady" (1986)	"Call Me" (1987)

Audio video
- "Easy Lady" on YouTube

"Easy Lady" is a song by Italian disco singer Spagna, released in 1986 as the lead single from her debut studio album, Dedicated to the Moon (1987).

Although she and her brother, Theo Spagna, had already composed several songs for artists such as Boney M or Fun Fun, Spagna became known to the general public through this song.

In December 2024, Spagna released a dance version of the song, titled "T'amo t'amo t'amo", featuring Italian- and Neapolitan-language lyrics based on a Salvo Nicolosi rendition and remixed by DJ Nuzzle.

== Commercial performance ==
"Easy Lady" topped the charts in Italy and Spain. The single debuted at number 12 in Switzerland on 31 August 1986, peaking at number two in its fifth week. In France, it debuted at number 38 before peaking at number four for three non-consecutive weeks, spending 10 weeks in the top 10. That same year, the song was certified silver by the Syndicat National de l'Édition Phonographique (SNEP), denoting sales in excess of 250,000 copies. The single has sold 80,000 copies in Italy and 600,000 copies in Europe. Elsewhere, "Easy Lady" reached number 12 in West Germany, number 30 in Austria and number 62 in the United Kingdom.

== Track listings ==
- 7-inch single

A. "Easy Lady" – 4:08
B. "Jealousy" – 3:52

- 12-inch single

A. "Easy Lady" – 6:55
B. "Jealousy" – 5:25

- 12-inch single (club remix)

A. "Easy Lady" (club remix) – 6:40
B. "Jealousy" – 5:25

- Italian 12-inch single (Move On Up remix)

A. "Easy Lady" (Move On Up remix) – 6:40
B. "Easy Lady" (instrumental version) – 6:40

- European 12-inch single (extended version)

A. "Easy Lady" (extended version) – 6:55
B. "Easy Lady" / "Call Me" (combimix) – 5:50

- UK 12-inch single (extended remix)

A. "Easy Lady" (extended mix) – 6:55
B1. "Easy Lady" / "Call Me" (combimix) – 5:50
B2. "Jealousy" – 3:52

- UK 12-inch single

A. "Easy Lady" (album mix) – 6:40
B1. "Dance, Dance, Dance" – 4:15
B2. "Jealousy" – 3:52

== Charts ==
=== Weekly charts ===
Weekly chart performance for "Easy Lady"
Chart (1986–1987)	Peak position
Austria (Ö3 Austria Top 40)	30
Belgium (Ultratop 50 Flanders)	21
Europe (European Hot 100 Singles)	5
France (SNEP)	4
Italy (Musica e dischi)	1
Netherlands (Dutch Top 40)	24
Netherlands (Single Top 100)	16
Spain (AFYVE)	1
Switzerland (Schweizer Hitparade)	2
UK Singles (OCC)	62
West Germany (GfK)	12

=== Year-end charts ===
Year-end chart performance for "Easy Lady"
Chart (1986)	Position
Europe (European Hot 100 Singles)	24
Switzerland (Schweizer Hitparade)	19

== Certifications ==
Certifications for "Easy Lady"
Region	Certification	Certified units/sales
France (SNEP)	Silver	400,000
Italy	—	80,000
Spain (PROMUSICAE)	Gold	25,000^{^}
Summaries
Europe	—	1,500,000
^{^} Shipments figures based on certification alone.
