= Fio Zanotti =

Italian composer, conductor and producer

- Born: Fiorenzo Zanotti; 20 November 1949 (age 76); Bologna, Italy
- Occupations: Producer; arranger; conductor; composer; musician

Fiorenzo "Fio" Zanotti (born 20 November 1949) is an Italian record producer, arranger, conductor, composer and multiinstrumentalist.

Born in Bologna, Zanotti graduated from the conservatory of his hometown as a conductor. His first musical experiences were as an accordionist in the Linetti Orchestra, and an organist in the musical group Judas. In 1980 he started a long collaboration with Loredana Bertè. He has also collaborated with a number of other notable Italian artists and groups, including Pooh (for whom he produced and arranged many albums in the 1980s), Zucchero Fornaciari, Adriano Celentano, Vasco Rossi, Renato Zero, Francesco De Gregori, Spagna, Claudio Baglioni, Anna Oxa, Fiordaliso, and Gianluca Grignani. In the 1990s he was a member of the supergroup Adelmo e i suoi Sorapis. From the late 1990s onward he conducted for numerous RAI television programs.

Since 1990 he has participated in almost every edition of the Sanremo Music Festival – as composer, arranger, producer, conductor – winning several editions including the 1999 edition (conducting the song "Senza pietà" by Anna Oxa, which he also produced) and the Nuove Proposte section in 2010 (conducting the winning song "Il linguaggio della resa" by Tony Maiello).
