= Dietro le apparenze =

Studio album by Giorgia
- Released: 6 September 2011
- Genres: Pop; R&B
- Length: 51:57
- Language: Italian
- Label: Sony Music
- Producers: Michele Canova; Giorgia Todrani

Giorgia chronology
Spirito libero - Viaggi di voce 1992-2008 (2008)	Dietro le apparenze (2011)	Senza paura (2013)

Singles from Dietro le apparenze
- 1. "Il mio giorno migliore" Released: 12 June 2011; 2. "È l'amore che conta" Released: 9 September 2011; 3. "Inevitabile" Released: 18 November 2011; 4. "Dove sei" Released: 10 February 2012; 5. "Tu mi porti su" Released: 13 April 2012

Dietro le apparenze is the eighth studio album by Italian singer Giorgia, released on 6 September 2011 by Sony Music.

The album featured several successful singles including "Il mio giorno migliore" and the collaborations "Inevitabile" with Eros Ramazzotti and "Tu mi porti su" with Jovanotti. It peaked at number one on the Italian Albums Chart, becoming her second recording project to achieve it since Ladra di vento (2003), selling over 120,000 units in Italy.

== Background and composition ==
After her seventh studio album Stonata (2007), Giorgia took a discography break and changed her management team; in 2010 she also gave birth of their first child with her fiancé Emanuel Lo. In May 2011 Giorgia announced her eighth studio album Dietro le apparenze, produced by the singer herself with the new producer Michele Canova. The record project featured thirteen traks with collaboration with italian singers Eros Ramazzotti and Jovanotti. In an interview with Rockol Giorgia explained the meaning of the album and its production process:

"At a later age, you gain an awareness that allows you to notice things that used to pass before your eyes without a trace. On this record I wrote less than on those made in the past, but I realized that you have to 'feel' a song in order to interpret it credibly. So even in this respect I must admit that 'Behind Appearances' represents a big step forward."

== Critics reception ==
In an album review Rockol wrote that Giorgia "mixes together different genres and different types of interpretation" with "lyrics that are sometimes reflective and sometimes ironic" and "notable collaborations embellish the final work without taking away from the singer-songwriter's focus".

== Track listing ==
Dietro le apparenze track listing
No.	Title	Lyrics	Music	Producer(s)	Length
1.	"Il mio giorno migliore"	Giorgia Todrani	Todrani; Emanuel Lo	Michele Canova	3:38
2.	"Sembra impossibile"	Todrani; Lo	Todrani; Lo	Canova	4:34
3.	"È l'amore che conta"	Todrani; Allan Rich; Michael James Ryan Busbee; Jud Friedman	Allan Rich; Michael James Ryan Busbee; Jud Friedman	Canova	3:19
4.	"Inevitabile" (with Eros Ramazzotti)	Ramazzotti; Adelio Cogliati; Luca Chiaravalli	Ramazzotti; Chiaravalli	Todrani; Canova	3:54
5.	"Dove sei"	Lo	Lo	Canova	3:20
6.	"Passerà l'estate"	Marina Rei	Rei	Canova	3:26
7.	"Solo grazie a te"	Lo; Todrani	Lo; Todrani	Canova	3:35
8.	"Vado via"	Todrani	Todrani; Lo	Canova	4:38
9.	"Dietro le apparenze"	Todrani; Lo	Lo	Canova	4:03
10.	"Tu mi porti su" (featuring Jovanotti)	Lorenzo Cherubini	Cherubini; Riccardo Onori	Canova	3:41
11.	"Niente ci porta via"	Todrani	Todrani	Todrani; Canova	3:13
12.	"E adesso tu"	Todrani	Lo	Canova	3:27
13.	"Resta la musica"	Todrani	Emanuele Bossi	Canova	3:22

== Charts ==
=== Weekly charts ===
Chart (2011)	Peak position
Italian Albums (FIMI)	1
Swiss Albums (Schweizer Hitparade)	19

=== Year-end charts ===
Chart (2011)	Position
Italy (FIMI)	13
Chart (2012)	Position
Italy (FIMI)	27

== Certifications ==
Region	Certification	Certified units/sales
Italy (FIMI)	2× Platinum	120,000^{*}
^{*} Sales figures based on certification alone.
