= Senza paura =

Senza Paura

Studio album by Giorgia
- Released: 5 November 2013
- Studios: Hollywood (Sunset Sound Studios); Milan
- Genres: Pop; R&B; soul
- Length: 54:01
- Languages: Italian; English
- Label: Sony Music
- Producers: Michele Canova; Giorgia Todrani

Giorgia chronology
Dietro le apparenze (2011)	Senza Paura (2013)	Oronero (2016)

Singles from Senza paura
- 1. "Quando una stella muore" Released: 4 October 2013; 2. "I Will Pray (Pregherò)" Released: 29 November 2013; 3. "Non mi ami" Released: 21 March 2014; 4. "Io fra tanti" Released: 11 July 2014; 5. "La mia stanza" Released: 24 October 2014

Senza Paura is the ninth studio album by Italian singer Giorgia, released on 5 November 2013 by Sony Music.

The album featured several successful songs, including the singles "Quando una stella muore", "Non mi ami" and the international collaboration "I Will Pray (Pregherò)" with Alicia Keys.

The album peaked at number one on the Italian Albums Chart, being certified double platinum by Federazione Industria Musicale Italiana. It was nominated at the 2014 World Music Awards.

== Background and composition ==
The album, produced by the singer herself with Michele Canova Iorfida, was recorded at the Sunset Sound Recorders di Los Angeles. It involved in writing and composition international artists such as Natasha Bedingfield, Olly Murs, Michael Landau, Alex James, Norma Jean Martine and Alicia Keys. In an interview with La Repubblica:

"It's a confluence of so many things that I've struggled with for years, without being able to fully amalgamate them, the writing, the singing, the arrangements, let's say that in the end it's like I came together, completely."

== Critics reception ==
Rockol wrote that it is understood from the tracks that "she seems to have learned to trust her instincts more and more, when recording she proves to be more spontaneous than usual", expressed through passages with "contagious, lively contemporaneity" and others with "universal emotions". The magazine appreciated the collaboration with Keys, writing that it is "a must-have gem for contemporary soul", appreciating Keys' willingness to "spiritually" enter the song by singing in Italian.

Alessandro Alicandri of Panorama wrote that Giorgia has a "solar" approach to lyrics and themes and with ballads that are "few, measured and very intense", affirming the track "Avrò cura di te" as the best on the album. Alicandri considered that the album "looks fashionable without ever becoming experimental" while still remaining "very fresh and enjoyable".

== Track listing ==
Senza paura track listing
No.	Title	Lyrics	Music	Producer(s)	Length
1.	"Non mi ami"	Giorgia Todrani	Fraser Lance Thorneycroft-Smith; Natasha Bedingfield	Michele Canova Iodrifa	3:45
2.	"Quando una stella muore"	Todrani	Patrizio Moi; Norma Jean Martine	Canova	3:21
3.	"I Will Pray (Pregherò)" (featuring Alicia Keys)	Todrani; Alicia Augello Cook	Viktoria Hansen; Andreas Romdhane; Josef Larossi	Canova	3:37
4.	"Io fra tanti"	Todrani; Emanuel Lo Iacono	Emanuel Lo Iacono	Canova
5.	"Riflesso di me"	Lo; Todrani	Lo; Todrani	Canova
6.	"Perfetto"	Lo; Todrani	Lo; Todrani	Canova
7.	"Avrò cura di te"	Lo; Todrani		Canova
8.	"La mia stanza"	Canova; Todrani	Canova; Todrani	Canova
9.	"Oggi vendo tutto"	Ivano Fossati	Fossati	Canova
10.	"Did I lose you" (featuring Olly Murs)	Michael James Ryan Busbee; Lauren Evans; Alex James	Busbee; Evans; James	Canova
11.	"Ogni fiore"	Lo	Lo	Canova
12.	"L’amore s’impara"	Todrani	Canova; Todrani	Canova
13.	"Il cielo è sempre il cielo"	Lo	Lo	Canova
14.	"Vedrai com’è"	Lo	Lo	Canova
15.	"Pregherò"	Todrani	Hansen; Andreas Romdhane; Josef Larossi	Canova
16.	"Quando una stella muore (reprise)"	Todrani	Patrizio Moi; Norma Jean Martine	Canova

== Commercial performance ==
The album debuted at number one on the Italian Albums Chart, becoming Giorgia's third album to achieve it after Mangio troppa cioccolata (1997) and Dietro le apparenze (2011). On the week ending on August 14, 2014, the album peaked again at number one for one week.

== Charts ==
=== Weekly charts ===
Chart (2013)	Peak position
Italian Albums (FIMI)	1
Swiss Albums (Schweizer Hitparade)	58

=== Year-end charts ===
Chart (2013)	Position
Italy (FIMI)	22
Chart (2014)	Position
Italy (FIMI)	15

== Certifications ==
Region	Certification	Certified units/sales
Italy (FIMI)	2× Platinum	100,000^{*}
^{*} Sales figures based on certification alone.
