= Celso Valli =

Italian composer (1950–2025)

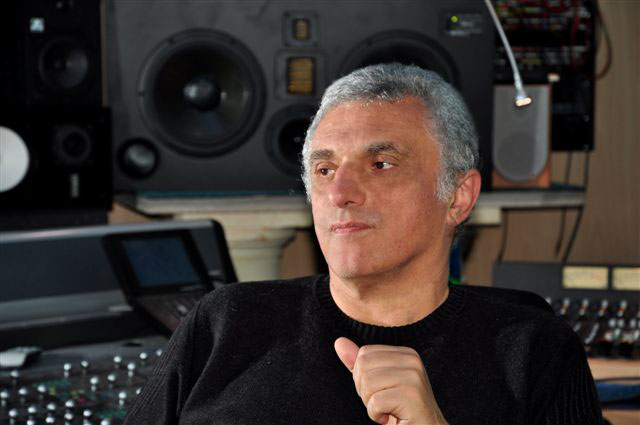
- Valli in 2010
- Born: 14 May 1950; Bologna, Italy
- Died: 27 July 2025 (aged 75); Bologna, Italy
- Occupations: Composer, conductor, arranger, producer

Celso Valli (14 May 1950 – 27 July 2025) was an Italian composer, conductor, arranger, and record producer.

== Life and career ==
Born in Bologna, Valli studied at the Conservatorio Giovanni Battista Martini. He made his official debut collaborating with Drupi in his 1978 album Provincia. In the same years he started producing, arranging and occasionally working as a composer in a number of Italo disco projects, including Tantra, Azoto, and Passengers. Since 1979 he started collaborating with Mina, then he was producer and collaborator of some of the most successful Italian artists between 1980s and 2000s, notably Andrea Bocelli, Laura Pausini, Eros Ramazzotti, Filippa Giordano, Mango, Vasco Rossi, Matia Bazar, Raf, Giorgia, and Gerardina Trovato. Valli died on 27 July 2025, at the age of 75.
