= Giorgia (singer) =

Italian singer-songwriter (born 1971)

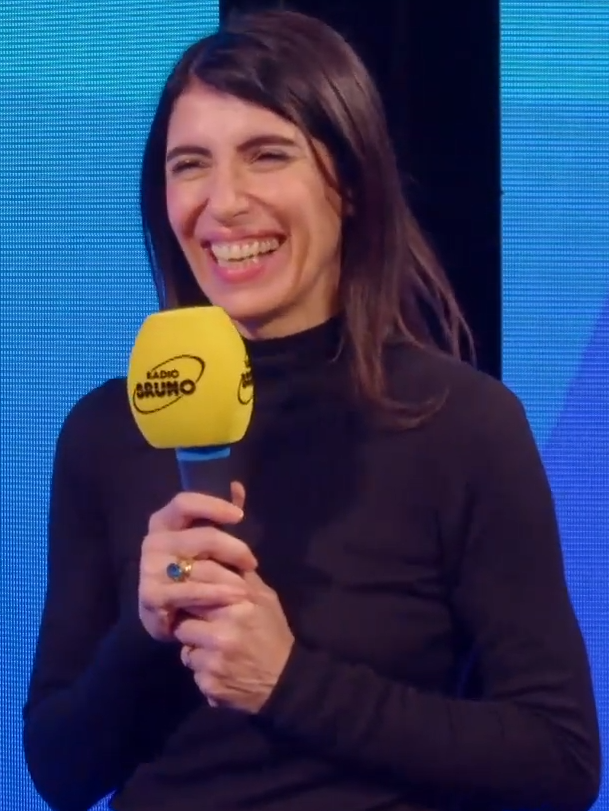
- Giorgia in February 2025

Background information
- Born: Giorgia Todrani; 26 April 1971 (age 55); Rome, Italy
- Genres: R&B; pop; soul
- Occupations: Singer; songwriter; record producer
- Years active: 1993–present
- Labels: Dischi di cioccolata; Sony Music; Epic
- Website: giorgia.net

Giorgia Todrani (Italian: [ˈdʒordʒa toˈdraːni]; born 26 April 1971), known professionally as simply Giorgia, is an Italian singer-songwriter. Nicknamed "the Italian Whitney Houston", she is known for her wide vocal range, high belting register and great vocal abilities, she is one of the most famous Italian singers, she has released twelve studio albums all enjoying commercial success. Giorgia has become fairly well known throughout Europe as an ambassador for Italian pop music.

Giorgia holds the first place among the female Italian artists of her generation for number of weeks in the Fimi-Nielsen chart, and she has sold over 25 million records worldwide, with 17 top-ten albums of which 6 number-one on the Italian album chart, and 24 top-ten singles of which 5 number-one hits on the Italian singles chart. She has participated five times at the Sanremo Music Festival, in 1995, in 1996, in 2001, in 2023 and in 2025, placing at the first, third, second, sixth and sixth place respectively. At the Sanremo Music Festival 1995, she won 4 prizes on the same night (Festival First Awards, Radio/TV Awards, Authors Awards and "Mia Martini" Awards), holding the unbeaten Sanremo record of a winning artist collecting all the prizes at once. In her career, Giorgia has won 8 Italian and Wind Music Awards, a David di Donatello, a Nastro d'Argento and a "Premio Lunezia".

== Biography ==
Giorgia was born in Rome and started performing at an early age in several Roman Jazz clubs. She was influenced by classic soul and jazz artists such as Aretha Franklin, Whitney Houston, Stevie Wonder, Ella Fitzgerald, Michael Jackson among others. She recorded two live albums in the early 1990s, called One more go round and A Natural Woman.

== Career ==
=== Debut album ===
Her debut was on the stage of the Ariston theatre for the 1994 Sanremo Music Festival when she sang "E poi" in the category Nuove Proposte (New Acts). At that festival she ended in seventh position in the final New Act chart (losing to Andrea Bocelli who praised her in his winning speech). E poi, is still nowadays one of her most famous songs.

Her debut-album Giorgia sold more than 160,000 copies in Italy and approximately 1 million worldwide (it was a best seller in Italy and enjoyed good success in Germany too). A few months later Luciano Pavarotti asked her to perform with him in a duet at the annual Pavarotti & friends show in Modena, Italy where she gave a performance of Queen's Who Wants to Live Forever. She also sang with the famous tenor. In 1994 Giorgia won the European Award as "best Young Italian artist".

=== Sanremo Music Festival and second album ===
In 1995 she returned to the Sanremo Music Festival, singing "Come saprei". She won the competition and the critics' award too, becoming the second artist to achieve that (the first being Domenico Modugno) but being the first Italian female singer to win both awards. During the competition she won 4 awards. Her second album Come Thelma & Louise sold more than 8 million copies worldwide, of which 300,000 copies certified in Italy, making it the biggest success of her career (the album was released throughout Europe and also in Japan). In the same year, Todrani recorded the song "Vivo per lei" with tenor Andrea Bocelli.

=== Strano il mio destino (1996) ===
In 1996 she entered the Sanremo Music Festival for the third time with the song "Strano il mio destino" and ended in third place. Strano il mio destino – Live & studio 95/96 is the title of her third release, which included live tracks, the Sanremo single and another studio recording. The album sold 800,000 copies.

=== Mangio troppa cioccolata (1997) ===
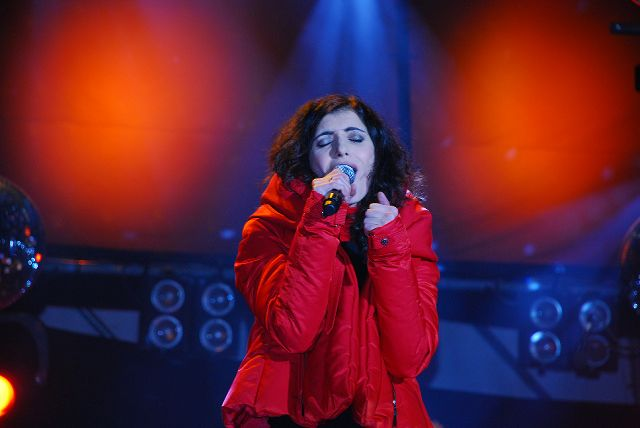
Giorgia in Rome in 2008

In the middle of 1997 she released a cover of an old Italian song by Ornella Vanoni called "Un'ora sola ti vorrei", with a new music sound r&b oriented and a new image; later that year, her third studio album, Mangio troppa cioccolata, was released and started a new dimension on her career, with less ballads and more uptempos, focusing more on the sound and in the interpretation than in the vocals, something that would become a prerogative in her subsequent releases. This album was released in ten European countries enjoying good commercial success. The same year music television "MTV Europe"asked Giorgia to present a TV program, but she rejected the proposal. The album sold 1 million copies.

=== Girasole (1999) ===
After the release of a song from another soundtrack movie called "Il cielo in una stanza" (a cover of an Italian song by Gino Paoli), in early 1999 she released her fourth studio album called Girasole, a very melodic and pop oriented record that gave her more success, helped by the hit single "Girasole", one of the top selling Italian songs of the middle of 1999. The same year she toured internationally alongside jazz musician Herbie Hancock.

==== 2000 ====
In 2000, Ray Charles invited her to one of his concerts and asked her to sing "Georgia on My Mind" after she told him that her father named her Giorgia in honour of the song. Giorgia produced "Girasole" by herself; thanks to this album (one of the most successful of her career) she became more widely known. The same year she sang a duet with Michael McDonald, in Turin during her concert and in his concert in Milan. In the middle of 2000, in her Fai Sentire La Tua Voce Tour 2000 she performed a duet with Lionel Richie in All Night Long at the Ericsson Summer Festival. 2000 was also the year of her performance at the Primo Maggio festival that included a reworking of Prince's Nothing compares to you (2 U).

=== Senza ali (2001) ===
In 2001, she returned to Sanremo Music Festival finishing in second place with the song "Di Sole e d'Azzurro" written by Zucchero and included in her 5th studio Album "Senza Ali" , which features Herbie Hancock as special guest in "Il mare sconosciuto" track. Previously Giorgia had already performed with Hancock during his European tour dedicated to George Gershwin in (1999), and during a concert at the Royal Festival Hall of London along with Youssou N’Dour in 2000. The album sold 6 million copies worldwide.

=== Greatest hits-Le cose non-vanno mai come credi (2002) ===
In 2002 she released her first Best of album titled Greatest hits – Le cose non-vanno mai come credi which sold more than 700,000 copies in Italy and 5 million worldwide and stayed in the Italian chart for over a year. The album spawned some Italian hits and was still in the Italian chart in 2008. The year ended with a duet with ex-Boyzone Ronan Keating. The song was We've Got Tonight, a cover of a hit by Bob Seger, and the duet with Keating was released across Europe.

=== Ladra di Vento (2003) ===
In 2003 she released her 6th studio album, Ladra di Vento, which included her biggest hit: Gocce di Memoria. The song reached the top spot of the Italian FIMI singles chart and became the best selling single of 2003, with 130,000 copies sold. The song reached the top 40 of the European singles chart. Gocce di Memoria was the original theme-song from Turkish-Italian film-maker Ferzan Ozpetek's movie "la Finestra di fronte" Facing Windows starring Giovanna Mezzogiorno, it gained Giorgia many awards including the "David di donatello", the "Silver ribbon" and three "Italian music awards".

=== Mtv Unplugged (2005) ===
In 2005, Giorgia was the first Italian artist to release an MTV Unplugged recorded in Milan. The live CD includes acoustic versions all of her major hits. The album has been certified triple platinum in Italy and gained Giorgia many awards. She was supported by the band of Prince, Terence Blanchard and during the concert she dueted with soul star Ricky Fanté.

=== Stonata (2007) ===
In 2007 she released her seventh studio album, Stonata. The album debuted at the second position of the Italian chart and was certified double platinum. The album featured a duet with the Italian singer Mina. The song was Poche Parole and was the first duet for Mina, in her fifty-year-long career, with an Italian female.

=== Spirito libero Viaggi di voce 1992–2008 (2008) ===
On 21 November, Giorgia released her second greatest hits compilation (the first one was released in 2002), but this will be her first "Anthology" album with 3 cds full of hits, new songs, covers and new versions of some of her old songs; the first single is "Per fare a meno di te", which is the soundtrack of the movie "Solo un padre" directed by Luca Lucini, that hit Italian screens on 28 November 2008.

=== Dietro le apparenze (2011) ===
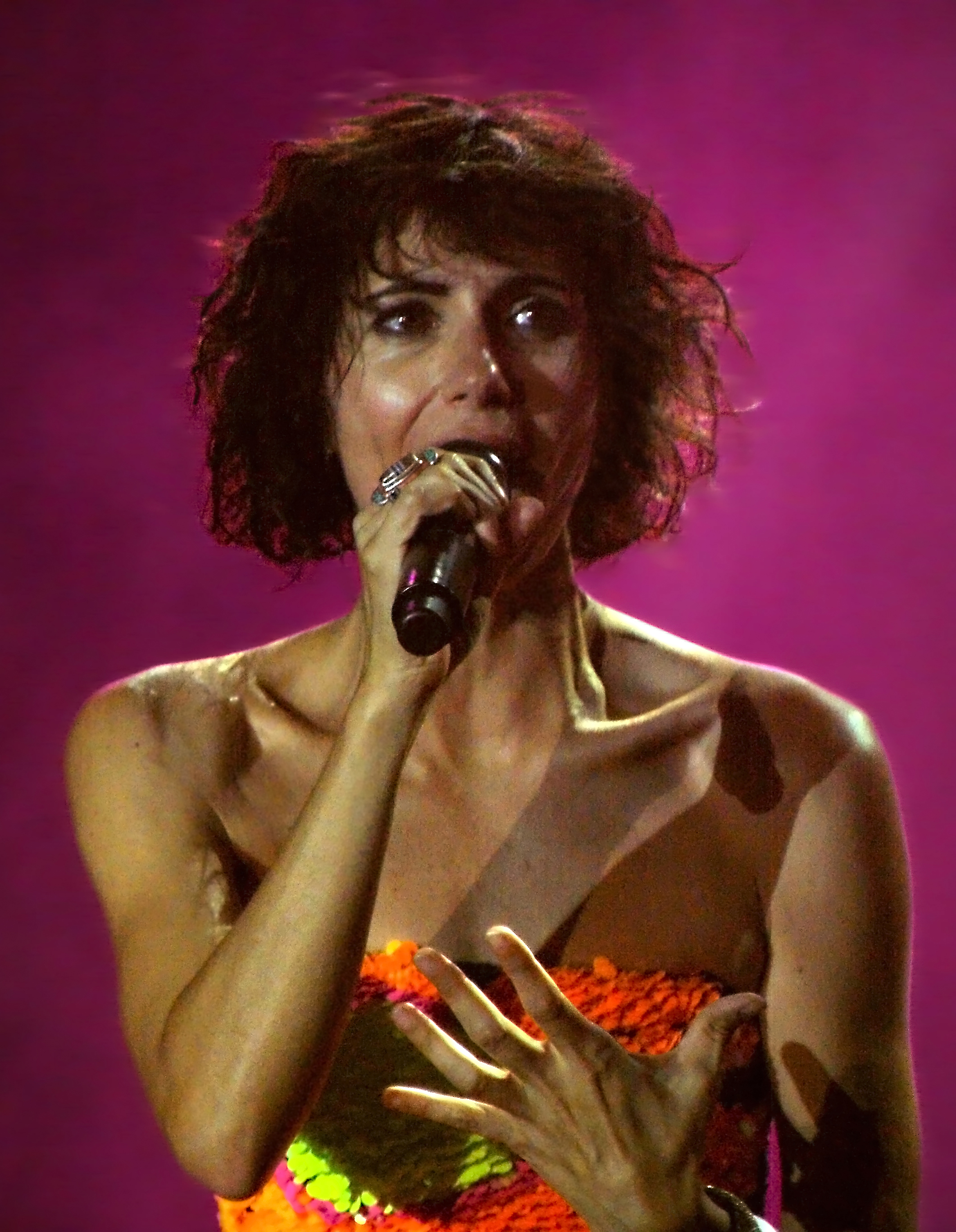
Giorgia in concert in Milan in 2012

In 2011 Giorgia released her 8th studio album, Dietro le apparenze, which included the 2011 summer hit: "Il mio giorno migliore" (platinum, with more than 30,000 copies). The album also featured a duet with one of the most important Italian singers, Eros Ramazzotti, in "Inevitabile"; as well as other collaborations: Passerà l'estate by Marina Rei; "È l'amore che conta", the second single, written by Busbee; and "Tu mi porti su" performed with Jovanotti (single certified double platinum, with more than 60,000 copies). The album Dietro le apparenze debuted at the first position of the Italian chart and was certified double platinum.

=== Senza paura (2013) and the Limited Gold Edition ===
In November 2013 Giorgia released her 9th studio album, Senza paura; the first single was "Quando una stella muore" (certified platinum, with more than 30,000 copies). The album also featured duets with international singers Alicia Keys, in "I Will Pray (Pregherò)" (the second single, certified gold); and Olly Murs, in Did I lose you. The third single, "Non mi ami", with music featured by Fraser T. Smith and Natasha Bedingfield in July 2014 was certified platinum (with more than 30,000 copies), and the fourth single, "Io fra tanti", on October was certified gold.

The album Senza paura debuted at the first position of the Italian chart, and was certified double platinum disk (with more than 120,000 copies). In 2014 it received a new nomination at the MTV Europe Music Awards in the category "Best Italian Act". In October 2014, the singer released Senza paura - Limited Gold Edition, containing a double CD: one with the same tracks as the recorded album, and an extra CD with live content from her 2014 tour Senza Paura; as well as a DVD containing extra content from her live show, the official music videos for her singles (Quando una stella muore, Non mi ami, Io fra tanti) and some unreleased backstage material.

On 24 October 2014, she released her fifth single from the album Senza Paura, "La mia stanza".

=== Oronero and Pop Heart (2016–2019) ===
On 15 February 2016, Giorgia's official site confirmed that she was working on a new album. The album was produced by Michele Canova, who also produced her previous two albums. On 12 September Giorgia revealed the title of her new single, "Oronero", announcing that it would be available for digital download from 20 September. On 28 November 2016, the track was certified platinum in Italy, after having sold more than 50,000 copies.

The album of the same name is the tenth studio album released by the Roman singer, and was released on 28 October 2016. It contains 15 tracks, 10 of which were written by Giorgia herself, as well as numerous collaborations with Italian and international artists. On 18 April 2018, the album was certified double platinum disk (with more than 100,000 copies).

On 8 February 2017, Giorgia performed at the Sanremo Music Festival 2017 competition. During the second evening of the festival, she performed her second single from Oronero: "Vanità" and a medley of her most famous Sanremo performances: "E poi", "Come saprei" and "Di sole e d'azzurro". Between 2017 and 2018 the singer embraced the Oronero Live Tour, which was recorded for the live album Oronero Live, promoted by the collaboration "Come neve" with Marco Mengoni.

On 16 November 2018 Giorgia publieshed the cover album Pop Heart, which pealed at number two on the Italian Albums Charts. The album featured covers in Italian and Enghish, including "Le tasche piene di sassi", "I Feel Love", "Una storia importante" and duets with Elisa on "Gli ostacoli del cuore". On March 22, 2019, she announced a summer tour, the Pop Heart Summer Nights, with a first date at the Lucca Comics & Games Festival, alongside Janelle Monáe.

=== Blu and G (2022–present) ===
After four years without publishing music, on 14 January 2022 she collaborated on "Parentesi" with Mara Sattei. On 4 December 2022, Giorgia participation in the Sanremo Music Festival 2023 was announced. She competed with the song "Parole dette male". The single was announced as the lead track of Giorgia's new album Blu¹, the first of a multi-part project, which was released on 17 February 2023. In 2023, it was released the film Scordato by Rocco Papaleo, which marked Giorgia's acting debut.

On 7 February 2024, Giorgia co-hosted the second night of the Sanremo Music Festival 2024 alongside Amadeus. In October 2024 she published the single "Niente di male" and hosted X Factor Italia. In December 2024, she was announced as one of the participants in the Sanremo Music Festival 2025 with the song "La cura per me". In the same month she appeared on the special 'Andrea Bocelli 30 - The Celebration', where she performed "Vivo per lei" alongside the legendary tenor. She won the cover night of the festival performing "Skyfall" with Annalisa, and ultimately finished the competition in 6th place. On 7 November 2025 her twelfth studio album G was published through Michroponica, and distributed by Sony Music.

== Other ventures ==
- She was nominated as Best Italian act at the MTV Europe Music Awards 2005 in Lisbon for the Italian hit "Gocce di Memoria".
- She is the only Italian artist to have sung with Elton John. The British singer called Giorgia One of the best and beautiful voices in the world.
- On 21 June 2009, Giorgia was involved in the charity concert "Amiche per l'Abruzzo" organized by Laura Pausini at the San Siro Stadium in Milan for the people hit by the earthquake in Abruzzo. She had duets with Elisa, Laura Pausini and other famous Italian female singers.

For her vocal qualities, Giorgia has been compared to Whitney Houston and Mina, and has been defined "fourth-best voice in the world". Billboard magazine called her "one of the most popular Italian singers" and stated that "she could have made it (a great success) in the USA too".

== Personal life ==
Giorgia is a fan of football team Lazio.

From 1997 to 2001, Giorgia was in a relationship with fellow singer Alex Baroni, who died in 2002 in a car accident. In the winter of 2009, Giorgia confirmed rumors that she and her fiancé, singer Emanuel Lo, were expecting their first child. On 18 February 2010, during the third night of the Sanremo Music Festival, it was announced that Giorgia had given birth to a baby boy, Samuel.

== Discography ==
=== Albums ===
- Giorgia (1994)
- Come Thelma & Louise (1995)
- Mangio troppa cioccolata (1997)
- Girasole (1999)
- Senza ali (2001)
- Ladra di vento (2003)
- Stonata (2007)
- Dietro le apparenze (2011)
- Senza paura (2013)
- Oronero (2016)
- Pop Heart (2018)
- Blu¹ (2023)
- G (2025)

== Filmography ==
=== Film ===
Year	Title	Role(s)	Notes
2017	Chi m'ha visto	Herself	Cameo appearance
2022	Normale con Giorgia	Herself	Short film
2023	Scordato	Olga Santopadre	Acting debut
2024	Moana 2	Matangi	Italian dub; voice role

=== Television ===
Year	Title	Role(s)	Notes
1994	Sanremo Music Festival 1994	Herself / Contestant	Performing "E poi" – 7th place in the Newcormers section
1995	Sanremo Music Festival 1995	Herself / Contestant	Performing "Come saprei" – Winner
1995	Sanremo Top	Herself / Co-host	Variety show
1996	Sanremo Music Festival 1996	Herself / Contestant	Performing "Strano il mio destino" – 3rd place
1998	So '90	Herself / Host	MTV music program
2001	Sanremo Music Festival 2001	Herself / Contestant	Performing "Di sole e d'azzurro" – 2nd place
2005	The Simpsons	Clarissa Wellington (voice)	Italian dub; episode: "A Star is Torn"
2009	Amiche per l'Abruzzo	Herself / Performer	Benefit concert for the 2009 L'Aquila earthquake
2020	Mia Martini: Fammi sentire bella	Herself	Special
2023	Sanremo Music Festival 2023	Herself / Contestant	Performing "Parole dette male" – 6th place
2024	Sanremo Music Festival 2024	Herself / Co-host	Guest host for the 2nd night
2024	Il Volo - Tutti per uno	Herself	Special
2024	Un posto al sole	Herself	Episode: "#1.6584"
2024–present	X Factor	Herself / Host	Talent show (season 18–present)
2025	Sanremo Music Festival 2025	Herself / Contestant	Performing "La cura per me" – 6th place
2025	Call My Agent - Italia	Herself	Episode: "Miriam"

== Awards and nominations ==
Year	Award	Category	Nominated work	Result	Ref.
All Music Italia Awards	2016	Best Album	Oronero	Nominated	
Campidoglio Award	2007	Honorary Award	Herself	Won	
Italian Music Awards	2001	Best Female Artist	Herself	Nominated	
Italian Music Awards	2002	Best Female Artist	Herself	Nominated	
Italian Music Awards	2002	Best Song	"Vivi davvero"	Nominated	
Italian Music Awards	2002	Best Video	"Vivi davvero"	Nominated	
Italian Music Awards	2003	Best Female Artist	Herself	Nominated	
Italian Music Awards	2003	Best Song	"Gocce di memoria"	Won	
Italian Music Awards	2003	Best Video	"Gocce di memoria"	Nominated	
Italian Music Awards	2003	Best Soundtrack	"Gocce di memoria"	Won	
Italian Music Awards	2003	Best Arrangement	"Gocce di memoria"	Won	
Italian Music Awards	2003	Best Tour	Ladra di Vento Tour	Nominated	
Italian Music Awards	2004	Best Female Artist	Herself	Nominated	
Leggio d'Oro	2010	Benefit Concert Award	Amiche per l'Abruzzo	Won	
LondonOne Radio Award	2023	Honorary Award	Herself	Won	
Lunezia Award	2012	Songwriter of the Year	Herself	Won	
MTV Italian Awards	2014	MTV History Award	Herself	Won	
MTV Europe Music Awards	2005	Best Italian Act	Herself	Nominated	
MTV Europe Music Awards	2012	Best Italian Act	Herself	Nominated	
MTV Europe Music Awards	2014	Best Italian Act	Herself	Nominated	
Musicultura Award	2017	Honorary Award	Herself	Won	
Nastro d'Argento	2003	Best Original Song	"Gocce di memoria"	Won	
Nastro d'Argento	2023	Best Actress – Comedy	Scordato	Nominated	
Riccio d'Argento	2005	Best Italian Artist	Herself	Won	
Rockol Awards	2023	Best Album	Blu	Nominated	
Sanremo Music Festival	1995	Winning Song – Champions Section	"Come saprei"	Won	
Sanremo Music Festival	1995	Mia Martini Critics' Prize	"Come saprei"	Won	
Sanremo Music Festival	1995	Radio Critics' Prize	"Come saprei"	Won	
Sanremo Music Festival	1995	Best Lyrics	"Come saprei"	Won	
Telegatto	1995	Best Female Artist	Herself	Won	
Umbria Film Festival	2023	Best Rising Actress	Scordato	Won	

Awards and achievements
Preceded by Aleandro Baldi with "Passerà"	Sanremo Music Festival; Winner; 1995	Succeeded by Ron with Tosca with "Vorrei incontrarti fra cent'anni"
