= A un passo da me =

EP by Trigno
- Released: 23 May 2025
- Genre: Pop
- Length: 15:44
- Language: Italian
- Label: Warner Music Italy
- Producer: Antonio Filippelli; Dat Boi Dee; Gianmarco Manilardi; Michele Canova Iorfida; Sixpm; Steve Tarta

Trigno chronology
Diciannove (2021)	A un passo da me (2025)

Singles from A un passo da me
- 1. "A un passo da me" Released: 12 November 2024; 2. "Maledetta Milano" Released: 14 January 2025; 3. "100 sigarette" Released: 1 April 2025; 4. "D'amore non si muore" Released: 6 May 2025

A un passo da me (transl. One step away from me) is the second extended play by Italian singer-songwriter Trigno. It was released on 23 May 2025 by Warner Music Italy.

== Description ==
The EP, composed of six songs, including a cover of "Overdose (d'amore)" by Zucchero sung with Nicolò Filippucci, and produced by Antonio Filippelli, Gianmarco Manilardi, Stefano Tartaglino, aka Steve Tarta, Michele Canova Iorfida, Davide Totaro, aka Dat Boi Dee, and Andrea "Sixpm" Ferrara, was released after the singer-songwriter's participation in the twenty-fourth edition of the talent show Amici di Maria De Filippi.

== Track listing ==
A un passo da me track listing
No.	Title	Writer(s)	Producer(s)	Length
1.	"Maledetta Milano"	Pietro Bagnadentro; Antonio Filippelli; Gianmarco Merolle; Stefano Tartaglino	Filippelli; Steve Tarta	2:34
2.	"D'amore non si muore"	Bagnadentro; Antonio Cirigliano; Chiara Vergati; Michele Canova Iorfida	Canova	2:45
3.	"A un passo da me"	Bagnadentro; Davide Totaro; Gianmarco Manilardi; Francesco Tarducci	Dat Boi Dee; Filippelli; Manilardi	2:50
4.	"100 sigarette"	Bagnadentro; Filippelli; Merolle; Tartaglino	Filippelli; Manilardi	3:01
5.	"Fari spenti"	Bagnadentro; Merolle; Tartaglino	Sixpm; Steve Tarta	2:27
6.	"Overdose d'amore" (live version) (with Nicolò Filippucci)	Adelmo Fornaciari	Zucchero	2:05

== Charts ==
Chart performance for A un passo da me
Chart (2025)	Peak position
Italian Albums (FIMI)	22
