= Filippucci =

Filippucci (pronounced [filipˈputtʃi]) is an Italian surname, derived from the given name Filippo. Notable people with the surname include:

- Lucio Filippucci (born 1955), Italian cartoonist
- Nicolò Filippucci (born 2006), Italian singer-songwriter
