= Un'ora di follia =

EP by Nicolò Filippucci
- Released: 23 May 2025
- Genre: Pop
- Length: 17:30
- Language: Italian
- Label: Warner
- Producer: Nicolò Filippucci; Freeso; Giordana Angi; ITACA; Piero Romitelli

Singles from Un'ora di follia
- 1. "Non mi dimenticherò" Released: 12 November 2024; 2. "Yin e Yang" Released: 14 January 2025; 3. "Cuore bucato" Released: 1 April 2025; 4. "Un'ora di follia" Released: 6 May 2025

Un'ora di follia (transl. An hour of madness) is the debut extended play by Italian singer Nicolò Filippucci. It was released on 23 May 2025 by Warner Music Italy.

== Description ==
The EP, consisting of six songs and produced by the artist himself with Giordana Angi, Fabio De Marco, Freeso, Piero Romitelli, Riccardo Scirè and ITACA, a team founded by the musical duo Merk & Kremont, was released after the singer-songwriter's participation in the twenty-fourth edition of the talent show Amici di Maria De Filippi.

== Track listing ==
Un'ora di follia track listing
No.	Title	Writer(s)	Producer(s)	Length
1.	"Un'ora di follia"	Irene Pellegrini; Eugenio Maimone; Federico Mercuri; Giordano Cremona; Samuel Balice; Sodivol	ITACA	2:57
2.	"Non mi dimenticherò"	Nicolò Filippucci; Federico Friso; Gianluca Ciccorelli; Lorenzo Lumia	Freeso	3:24
3.	"Cuore bucato"	Filippucci; Giordana Angi	Angi; Francesco Luzi	2:49
4.	"Yin e Yang"	Filippucci; Emilio Munda; Piero Romitelli; Antonio Maiello	Riccardo Scirè; Romitelli	3:16
5.	"Occhi stanchi"	Filippucci; Daniele Fossatelli; Fabio De Marco	De Marco	3:16
6.	"Mi sono innamorato di te"	Luigi Tenco	Filippucci	1:45

== Charts ==
Chart performance for Un'ora di follia
Chart (2025)	Peak position
Italian Albums (FIMI)	17
