= Trigno (disambiguation) =

Trigno may refer to:

== People ==
- Trigno (singer) (born 2002), Italian singer-songwriter

== Places ==
- Trigno, Italian river
- Bagnoli del Trigno, comune (municipality) in the Province of Isernia in the Italian region Molise
- Celenza sul Trigno, comune and town in the province of Chieti in the Abruzzo region of southern Italy
