= Giuseppe Giofrè =

Italian dancer (born 1993)

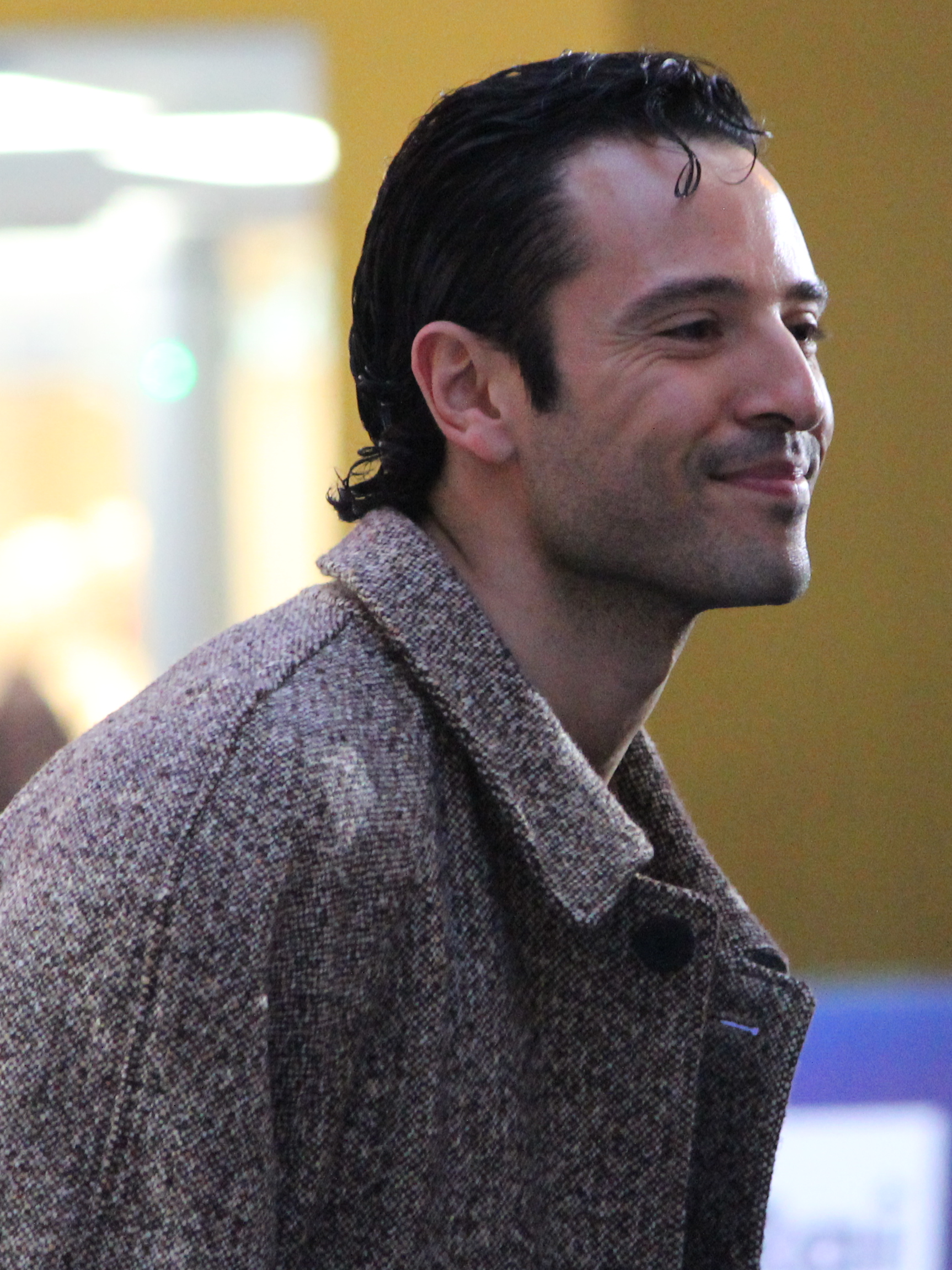
- Giofrè at the Sanremo Music Festival 2026
- Born: 10 January 1993 (age 33); Gioia Tauro, Calabria, Italy
- Occupations: Dancer; model; choreographer
- Years active: 2012–present
- Partner: Adam Vesperman (2018–2022)

Giuseppe Giofrè (Italian pronunciation: [dʒuˈzɛppe dʒoˈfrɛ]; born 10 January 1993) is an Italian dancer, model, and choreographer based in Los Angeles. He gained popularity competing during the eleventh season of Amici di Maria De Filippi, and for being on tour as a dancer for Ariana Grande, Jennifer Lopez, Nick Jonas, Taylor Swift, Kylie Minogue and Nicki Minaj.

== Career ==
Giofrè was born and raised in Gioia Tauro, Calabria. He started studying dance as a child in his hometown with ballet teacher Noemi Verduci, and at seventeen he moved to Reggio Calabria, Italy to study hip hop/jazz-funk music. In 2011 he joined the Italian talent show Amici di Maria De Filippi supported by choreographer and director Luciano Mattia Cannito, reaching the final phase of the programme in May 2012. Giofrè won the dance category of the show, obtaining a 6-month scholarship with the Millennium Dance Complex in Los Angeles, California.

After completing his studies in the United States, in July 2012 he took part in the music video of the song "Live 4 Die 4" by R.J. and Pitbull, released in September 2012. Later Giofrè was selected for the UK series The X Factor, working with the dance company choreographed by Brian Friedman, and a dancer of the NRJ Music Awards broadcast in the France. On April 1, 2013, Giofrè released his debut single, titled "Break", followed by his debut album Call on Me, released on 15 October 2013.

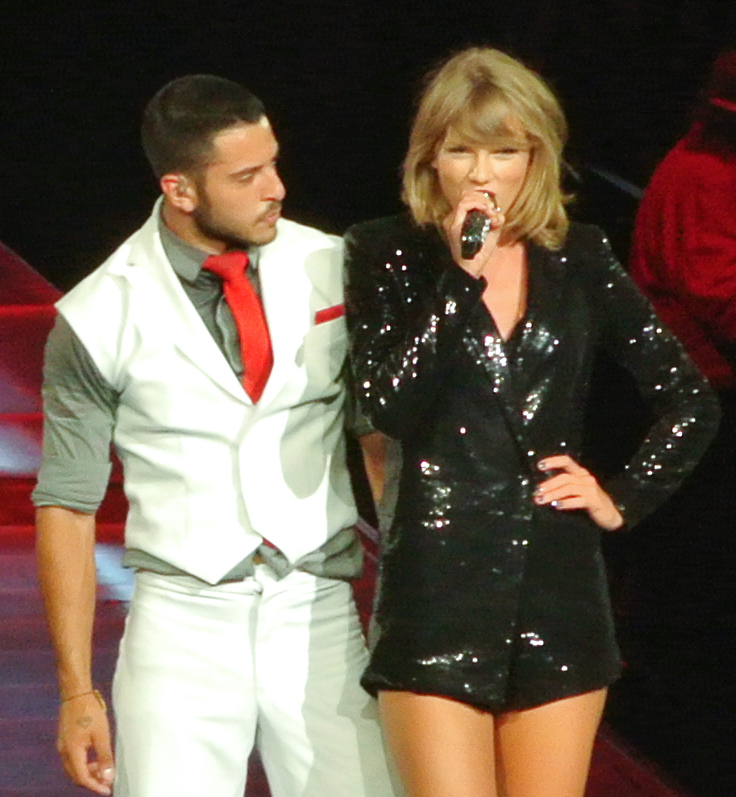
Giofré at The 1989 World Tour with Taylor Swift

In 2014, Giofrè moved to Los Angeles, thanks to a contract with McDonald Selzinick Associates (MSA), starting work as a dancer, appearing in music videos "Crazy" by Erika Jayne and "Something in the Water" by Carrie Underwood, choreographed by Travis Wall and winner of the CMT Music Award for Video of the Year. The following year he appeared on "Juicy Wiggle" by Redfoo and "La Malquerida" performed by Chiquis Rivera and directed by Jessy Terrero. From 2015, Giofrè joined American singer-songwriter Taylor Swift's projects, being initially selected as a backup dancer for The 1989 World Tour. He also appeared on Swift's music video for "New Romantics", directed by Jonas Åkerlund.

In 2016 Giofrè danced behind Nicki Minaj and Ariana Grande live performance of "Side to Side" at the MTV Video Music Awards, and behind Nick Jonas' performance during an episode of The Late Late Show with James Corden. In 2016 he also came back to Italy regularly until 2018 as an assistant and member of Amici di Maria De Filippi's dance troupe, working with Italian professional dancer and choreographer as Alessandra Celentano, Veronica Peparini and Elena D'Amario and Giuliano Peparini.

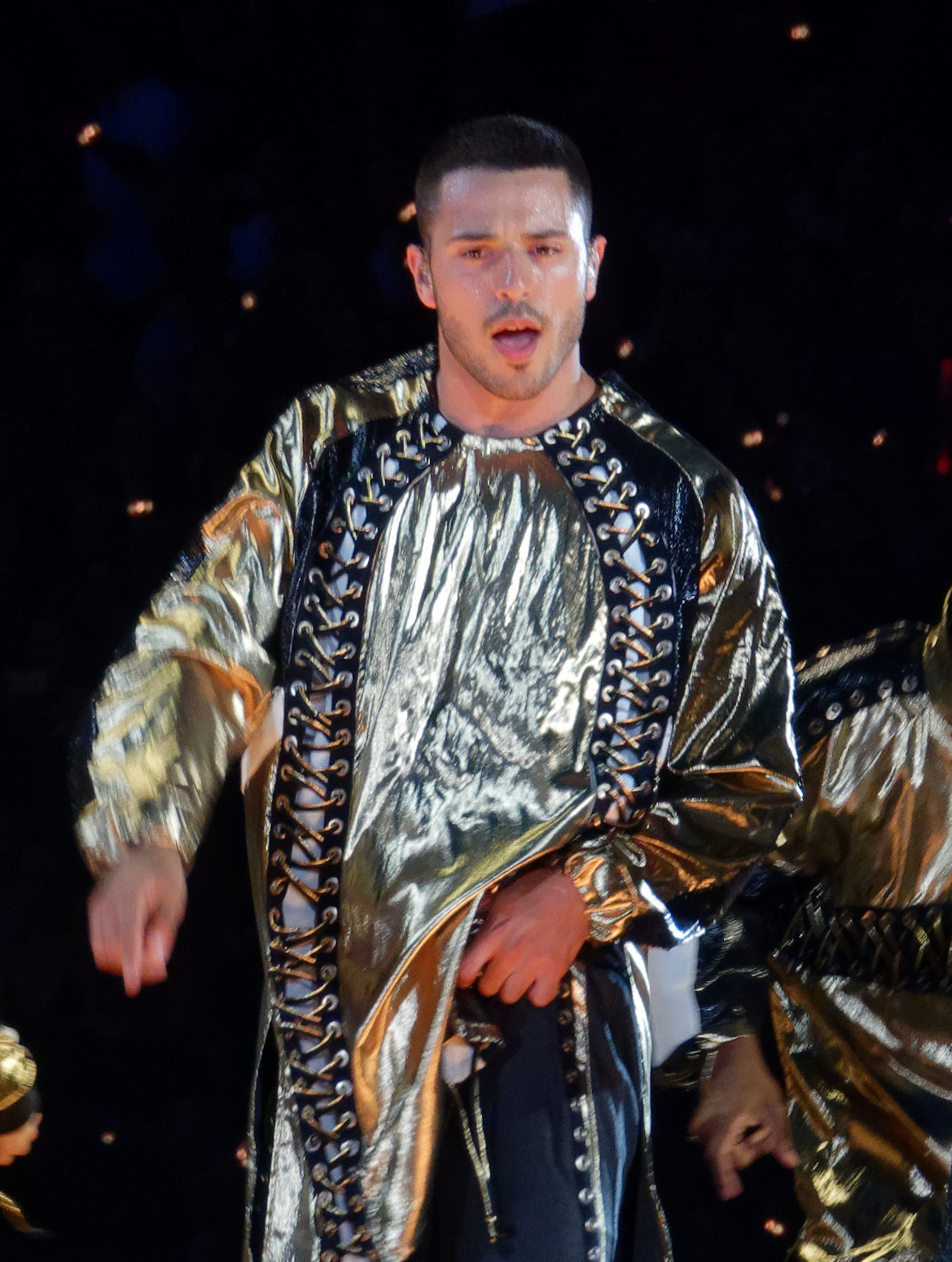
Giofrè performing at the Reputation Stadium Tour in 2018

In 2017 he was featured in projects with different artists, appearing among the dancers for Camila Cabello's performance at the Billboard Music Awards, in the music videos "Beautiful Trauma" by Pink, directed by Nick Florez and R. J. Durell, and in the video "Love So Soft" by Kelly Clarkson under the direction of Dave Meyer. The same year he worked with Swift again, being cast for "Look What You Made Me Do" and "...Ready for It?" music videos, both directed by Joseph Kahn and choreographed by Tyce Diorio. In 2018 he embraced Swift's Reputation Stadium Tour as a dance member.

In early 2019 Giofrè was supposed to dance at the Britney Spears Domination Residency Show in Las Vegas, later cancelled by the artist herself. He was cast in Swift's music video "Me!" and "You Need to Calm Down", working behind Swift and Dave Meyers direction and Tyce Diorio choreography. Between June and August 2019, he took part at the It's My Party Tour by Jennifer Lopez and he was cast as a dance troupe of Dancing with the Stars in September 2019.

In 2020 Giofrè returned to Italy to work as a professional dancer on Amici di Maria De Filippi. He also performed with Jonas Brothers on their Happiness Begins Tour and dance on Sam Smith and Demi Lovato's music video for "I'm Ready". In 2020 Giofrè danced for Dua Lipa's Studio 2054 concert, while in 2021 he acted in Amazon Prime Video film's Cinderella. In 2023 he was cast as judge for the final stage of the 22nd season of Amici di Maria De Filippi. In 2024 he danced alongside Kylie Minogue at the 49th People's Choice Awards for her "Padam Padam" performance, and was selected as lead dancer of Minogue summer performances at several European festivals, including at a concert at the Hyde Park in London and at the Sziget Festival in Budapest. The same year he work with Dave Meyers on Jennifer Lopez's "Can't Get Enough" music video. In July 2024 he danced for Christina Aguilera's performance for Dolce & Gabbana's Alta Moda Faschion Show.

Giofrè has worked alongside international artists such as Dua Lipa Justin Timberlake, Camila Cabello, Jennifer Lopez, Kelly Clarkson, Ariana Grande, Nicki Minaj, Paula Abdul, Wiz Khalifa, Leona Lewis, Kelsea Ballerini, Nelly, Charli XCX, Ellie Goulding, Selena Gomez, Omi, Fifth Harmony, Mary J Blige, Little Mix, Jason Derulo, Fetty Wap, Nick Jonas, Chiquis, Dan Reynolds of Imagine Dragons, The Weeknd, Erika Jayne, Carrie Underwood, Redfoo, Pitbull and Ricky Martin.

== Personal life ==
Between 2018 and 2022, Giofrè was romantically linked to fellow dancer Adam Vesperman.

== Discography ==
=== Singles ===
Title	Year	Album
"Call on Me"	2013	Call on Me
"I Got the Night"	2013	Call on Me
"Break"	2013	Call on Me
"One in a Billion"	2013	Call on Me
"Magnetic"	2013	Call on Me
"Call on Me (Remix)"	2013	Call on Me

== Filmography ==
=== Films ===
Film roles showing year released, title, role played and notes
Title	Year	Role	Notes
The 1989 World Tour Live	2016	Himself/ Dancer	Documenatary film
Taylor Swift's Reputation Stadium Tour	2018	Himself/ Dancer	Documenatary film
Cinderella	2021	Dancer/ Various	Feature film debut as a member of dance trope
L'estate più calda	2023	Michele	Acting debut

=== Television ===
Television appearances, showing year released, title, and notes
Title	Year	Role	Notes
Amici di Maria De Filippi	2011–2012	Himself / Contestant	Winner (season 11)
The X Factor	2013	Himself / Dancer	Talent show (season 9)
NRJ Music Award	2013	Himself / Dancer	Music awards show
Amici di Maria De Filippi	2015–2020	Himself / Professional dancer	Season 15–17, 20
The Late Late Show with James Corden	2016	Himself / Dancer	Talk show (dancer for Nick Jonas)
MTV Video Music Awards	2016	Himself / Dancer	Music awards show (dancer for Ariana Grande and Nicki Minaj)
Billboard Music Awards	2017	Himself / Dancer	Music awards show (dancer for Camila Cabello)
Dancing with the Stars	2019	Himself / Dancer	Talent show (season 19)
Amici di Maria De Filippi	2023–2024	Himself / Judge	Season 23-24 (final stage)
People's Choice Awards	2024	Himself / Dancer	Awards show (dancer for Kylie Minogue)
American Music Awards	2025	Himself / Dancer	Music awards show (dancer for Jennifer Lopez)
The Traitors Italia	2025	Himself / Contestant	Winner (season 1)
Vita in diretta	2026	Himself / Special correspondent	Talk show
Alessandro Borghese - Celebrity Chef	2026	Himself / Contestant	Winner
Sarabanda Celebrity	2026	Himself / Contestant	Quiz show

== Tours, live stage and festival ==
- Rock in Rio USA by Taylor Swift (2015)
- British Summer Hyde Park by Taylor Swift (2015)
- The 1989 World Tour by Taylor Swift (2015)
- Summer MixTape Festival by Paula Abdul (2016)
- BBC The Biggest Weekend by Taylor Swift (2018)
- Reputation Stadium Tour by Taylor Swift (2018)
- Domination by Britney Spears (2019)
- It's My Party Tour by Jennifer Lopez (2019)
- NYSE Annual Christmas Tree Lighting LIVVIA (2019)
- Happiness Begins Tour by Jonas Brothers (2019–2020)
- Studio 2054 by Dua Lipa (2020)
- British Summer Hyde Park by Kylie Minogue (2024)
- Sziget Festival by Kylie Minogue (2024)
- Up All Night: Live in 2025 by Jennifer Lopez (2025)

== Music videos ==
Title	Year	Director	Choreographer	Note
"Crazy" (Erika Jayne)	2014			
"Something in the Water" (Carrie Underwood)	2014	Raj Kapoor	Travis Wall	
"Juicy Wiggle" (Redfoo)	2015	Antony Ginandjar and Ashley Evans	Antony Ginandjar and Ashley Evans	
"La Malquerida" (Chiquis Rivera)	2015	Jessy Terrero		
"New Romantics" (Taylor Swift)	2016	Jonas Åkerlund		
"Beautiful Trauma" (Pink)	2017	Nick Florez and R. J. Durell	R. J. Durell	
"Love So Soft" (Kelly Clarkson)	2017	Dave Meyer	Marissa Heart	
"Look What You Made Me Do" (Taylor Swift)	2017	Joseph Kahn	Tyce Diorio	
"...Ready for It?" (Taylor Swift)	2017	Joseph Kahn	Tyce Diorio	
"Me!" (Taylor Swift)	2019	Taylor Swift and Dave Meyers	Tyce Diorio	
"You Need to Calm Down" (Taylor Swift)	2019	Taylor Swift and Drew Kirsch	Tyce Diorio	
"I'm Ready" (Sam Smith ad Demi Lovato)	2020	Jora Frantzis	Sean Bankhead	
"Can't Get Enough" (Jennifer Lopez)	2024	Dave Meyers		
"Save Me Tonight" (Jennifer Lopez and David Guetta)	2026	Cole Dabney		

== Commercials ==
- Dua Lipa for Vogue
- L’Oreal Karlie Kloss
- OLD NAVY The Holiyay Dancer
- OLD NAVY Electric Holidays
- OLD NAVY Jingle Jammies Jam
- OLD NAVY Rockstar
