= Holden (singer) =

Italian singer-songwriter and record producer (born 2000)

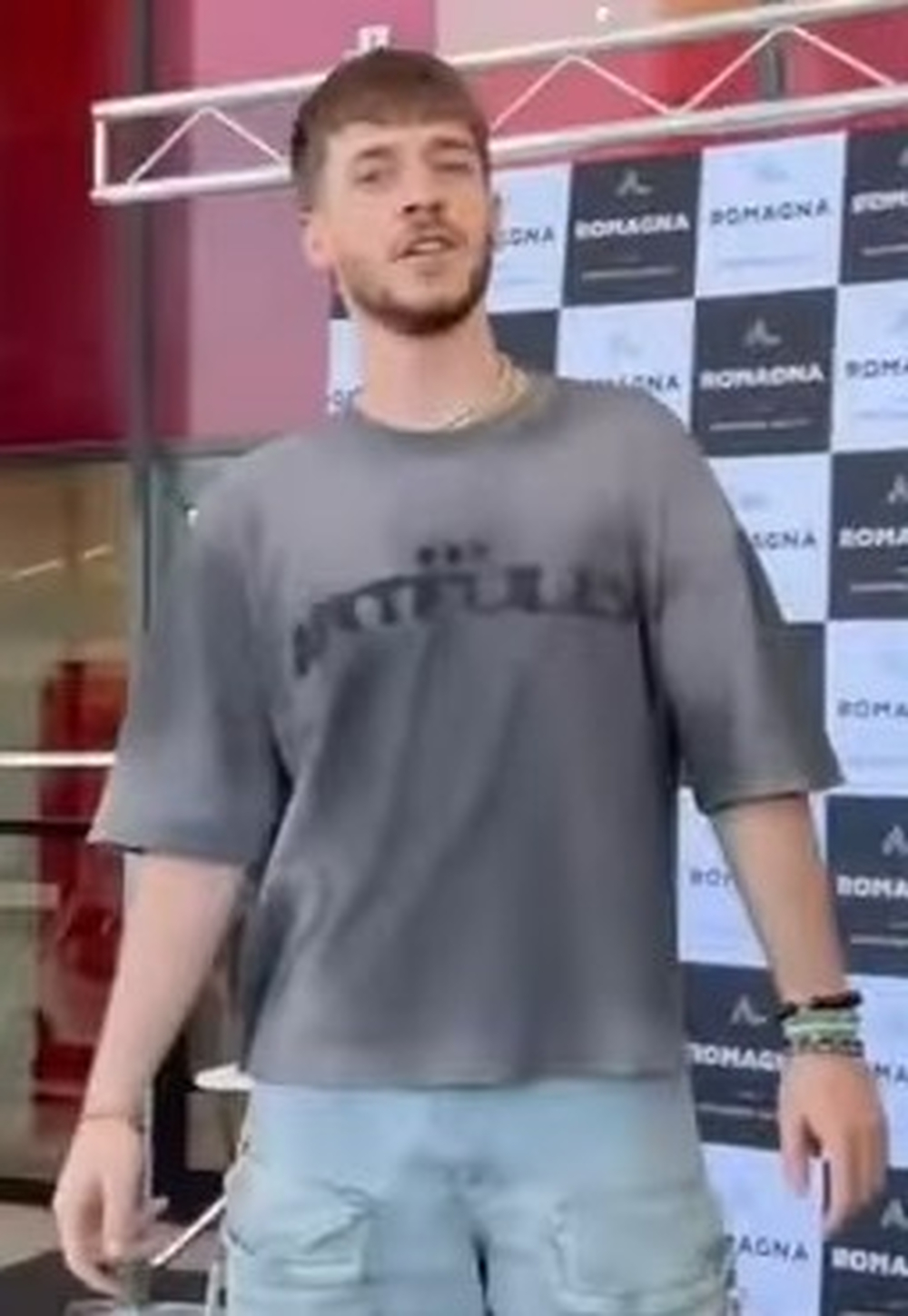
- Holden in July 2024

Background information
- Born: Joseph Carta; 15 February 2000 (age 26); Rome, Lazio, Italy
- Genres: Pop; hip-hop; R&B; alternative
- Occupations: Singer; songwriter; record producer
- Instruments: Vocals; guitar; piano
- Years active: 2019–present
- Labels: Believe Music (2019–2023); Sony Music (2019–2021); LaTarma, ADA, Warner Italy (2023–present)

Joseph Carta (born 15 February 2000), known professionally as Holden, is an Italian singer-songwriter and record producer.

== Early life and education ==
Born in Rome in 2000 and raised in the EUR and Montagnola neighborhoods, Joseph Carta is the third and youngest child of singer Paolo Carta and his first wife Rebecca Galli; he has two older biological brothers, Jader and Jacopo, and a younger half-sister, Paola, born from his father's relationship with singer-songwriter Laura Pausini.

His first approach to music was through EDM productions, and later through DJing in Roman nightclubs. After graduating from the Giuseppe Peano linguistic high school (Rome), he dedicated himself full-time to writing his first songs, first in English and then in Italian.

== Career ==
=== 2019: Il giovane Holden ===
His stage name was born as a tribute to the novel The Catcher in the Rye by the American writer J. D. Salinger, in which the artist identifies with the protagonist Holden Caulfield.

On 24 March 2019, he released his debut EP Il giovane Holden, which includes the song of the same name along with the songs "Se stava bene con te" and "Io rimango qua". In the same year, the singles "Come le altre", "Na na na" (which was certified gold followed by a platinum record), "Non fa per me" and "Cadiamo insieme" (certified gold record) were released.

=== 2020–2023: Prologo and unreleased works ===
In 2020, the songs "Fratè" and "Barriere" were released, and she duetted on Lowlow's song "Mondo sommerso". That same year, she released the singles "Se un senso c'è" and "Flute", the latter featuring Gemello, which preceded her debut album, Prologo, released on March 26, 2021. The album also included the songs "Alieno", "Roma-Milano", "Cliché" in collaboration with Coez and Quentin40, and "Fallo tu per me". On 22 October 2021, her song "Accelero ancora" was included on the soundtrack of the film "Anni da cane," distributed by Prime Video.

In 2022 the singles "Farmi a pezzi", "Tu lo sai già" and "Neon" were released and he duetted in the song "Con te" by Gemello. In January 2023 the single "Lampi" was released.

=== 2023–2024: participation in Amici 23 and Joseph ===
In September 2023, he auditioned for the twenty-third edition of the musical talent show Amici di Maria De Filippi, broadcast on Canale 5, and then made it to the initial round. In February 2024, he gained access to the evening round of the program, joining the team led by professors Rudy Zerbi and Alessandra Celentano. The following May, he reached the final, placing third in the singing category and winning the radio prize.

During his participation in Amici he released several unreleased songs, including "Dimmi che non è un addio" (achieving the highest debut in the history of the program after twenty hours from its release and later being certified gold) and "Nuvola" (also certified gold, making the artist the first student to certify two different songs before the start of the evening phase of the program). He subsequently released the songs "Solo stanotte" and "Randagi", included in his second EP Joseph, published on 24 May 2024 which debuted at sixth position in the FIMI Album chart. The same EP also included the songs "Ossidiana" and "Non siamo più noi due" in a duet with Gaia. In the summer of the same year he performed at several musical events, including "Future Hits Live", "RDS Summer Festival", "TIM Summer Hits", "Battiti Live", "105 Summer Festival", "Yoga Radio Bruno Estate" and the "Red Valley Festival".

=== 2024-present: unreleased projects and Holden tour ===
On 3 November 2024, during the sixth episode of the twenty-fourth edition of Amici di Maria De Filippi, he previewed his new single "Grandine", in collaboration with Mew, released on 8 November, which then debuted at number twenty-fifth in the Top Singles chart.

The Holden tour, his first major club tour in Italy, took place from 13 to 29 November 2024, from Florence to Milan. The dates in Rome, Milan, Bologna, and Turin were sold out. The single "Autodistruzione" was released on 18 April 2025, followed by "Baby drive" on 27 June.

== Discography ==
=== Studio albums ===
List of studio albums with album details
Title	Album details
Prologo	Released: 21 March 2021; Label: Believe Music, Sony Music; Format: CD, LP, MC, digital download, streaming

=== Extended plays ===
List of EPs and with selected chart positions
Title	EP details	Peak chart positions
Title	EP details	ITA
Il giovane Holden	Released: 11 May 2019; Label: Believe Music, Sony Music; Format: CD, digital download, streaming	—
Joseph	Released: 24 May 2024; Label: LaTarma, ADA, Warner Italy; Format: CD, digital download, streaming	6
"—" denotes EP that did not chart or were not released.

=== Singles ===
==== As lead artist ====
List of singles, with chart positions and album name
Single	Year	Peak chart positions	Certifications	Album or EP
Single	Year	ITA	Certifications	Album or EP
"Il giovane Holden"	2019	—		Il giovane Holden
"Se stavo bene con te"	2019	—		Il giovane Holden
"Io rimango qua"	2019	—		Il giovane Holden
"Come le altre"	2019	—		Non-album singles
"Na na na"	2019	31	FIMI: Platinum	Non-album singles
"Non fa per me"	2019	—		Non-album singles
"Cadiamo insieme"	2019	—	FIMI: Gold	Non-album singles
"Fratè"	2020	—		Non-album singles
"Barriere"	2020	—		Non-album singles
"Se un senso c'è"	2020	—		Prologo
"Flute" (featuring Gemello)	2020	—		Prologo
"Alieno"	2021	—		Prologo
"Roma-Milano"	2021	—		Prologo
"Cliché" (featuring Coez and Quentin40)	2021	—		Prologo
"Fallo tu per me"	2021	—		Prologo
"Farmi a pezzi"	2022	—		Non-album singles
"Tu lo sai già"	2022	—		Non-album singles
"Neon"	2022	—		Non-album singles
"Lampi"	2023	—		Non-album singles
"Dimmi che non è un addio"	2023	9	FIMI: Gold	Joseph
"Nuvola"	2023	30	FIMI: Gold	Joseph
"Solo stanotte"	2024	—		Joseph
"Randagi"	2024	—		Joseph
"Grandine" (featuring Mew)	2024	25		Non-album singles
"Autodistruzione"	2025	—		Non-album singles
"Baby drive"	2025	—		Non-album singles
"—" denotes singles that did not chart or were not released.

==== As featured artist ====
List of singles as featured artist
Title	Year	Album or EP
"Mondo sommerso" (Lowlow featuring Holden)	2020	Dogma 93
"Con te" (Gemello featuring Holden)	2022	La Quiete

== Tours ==
- 2024 – Holden tour

== Television programs ==
Year	Title	Network	Notes
2023–2024	Amici di Maria De Filippi	Canale 5	Contestant (season 23)

== Awards and nominations ==
Year	Award	Nomination	Work	Result	Notes
2024	Amici di Maria De Filippi	Radio Award	Herself	Won	
