= Luigi Strangis =

Italian singer-songwriter and multi-instrumentalist (born 2001)

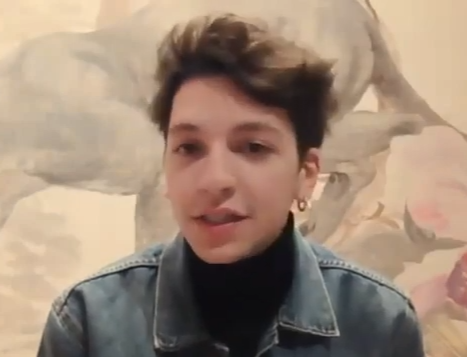
- Luigi Strangis in December 2023

Background information
- Born: Luigi Strangis; 26 February 2001 (age 25); Lamezia Terme, Catanzaro, Italy
- Genres: Pop
- Occupations: Singer-songwriter; multi-instrumentalist
- Instruments: Vocals; guitar; ukulele; piano; double bass; percussion; drums; harmonica; kazoo
- Years active: 2018–present
- Labels: Dissonanze Records (2018–2021); 21co / Artist First (2021–present)

Luigi Strangis (born 26 February 2001) is an Italian singer-songwriter and multi-instrumentalist. In 2022 he won the twenty-first edition of the talent show Amici di Maria De Filippi.

== Life and career ==
Born in 2001 in Lamezia Terme, in the province of Catanzaro, to a Calabrian mother, Emanuela, and a Neapolitan father, Giovanni Strangis, Luigi in 2018 released his first studio album Don't Ever Let Go for the record label Dissonanze Records, then making himself known following his participation in the initial phase of the twenty-first edition of the musical talent show broadcast on Canale 5 Amici di Maria De Filippi from September 2021. In March 2022 he gained access to the evening phase of the program by joining the team led by professors Rudy Zerbi and Alessandra Celentano and the following May he reached the final, emerging as the winner.

During his participation in Amici he released the singles "Vivo", "Muro", "Partirò da zero", "Tondo" and "Tienimi stanotte". The latter single was certified gold on 5 August by the FIMI and remained in the Italian singles chart for fourteen consecutive weeks. On 3 June 2022 his first EP Strangis was released by 21co, which rose directly to the top of the Italian album chart, with which he obtained his second gold record on 2 September.

The next single, "Stai bene su tutto", was released in September 2022 to anticipate the second studio album, Voglio la gonna, released on October 14. On December 16 he returned to the radio with the new single also taken from the second studio album, "Sembra Woodstock". In 2023 he released the singles "Adamo ed Eva" and "Stupida libertà" and duetted with Matteo Romano in the single "Tulipani blu".

== Discography ==
=== Studio albums ===
List of studio albums with album details
Title	Album details	Peak chart positions
Title	Album details	ITA
Don't Ever Let Go	Released: 12 August 2018; Label: Dissonanze Records	—
Voglio la gonna	Released: 14 October 2022; Label: 21co; Format: CD, LP, digital download	6

=== Extended play ===
List of EPs and with selected chart positions
Title	EP details	Peak chart positions		Certifications
Title	EP details	ITA	SWI	Certifications
Strangis	Released: 3 June 2022; Label: 21co; Format: CD, digital download, streaming	1	79	FIMI: Gold

=== Singles ===
List of singles, with chart positions and album name
Single	Year	Peak chart positions	Certifications	Album or EP
Single	Year	ITA	Certifications	Album or EP
"Vivo"	2021	—		Strangis
"Muro"	2021	—	FIMI: Gold	Strangis
"Partirò da zero"	2021	—		Strangis
"Tondo"	2022	—		Strangis
"Tienimi stanotte"	2022	33	FIMI: Platinum	Strangis
"Stai bene su tutto"	2022	—		Voglio la gonna
"Sembra Woodstock"	2022	—		Voglio la gonna
"Adamo ed Eva"	2023	—		/
"Tulipani blu" (with Matteo Romano)	2023	—		/
"Stupida libertà"	2023	—		/
"—" denotes singles that did not chart or were not released.

== Television programs ==
Year	Title	Network	Notes
2021–2022	Amici di Maria De Filippi 21	Canale 5	Contestant, Winner

== Awards and nominations ==
Year	Award	Category	Result	Notes
2022	Amici di Maria De Filippi 21	Singing	Won	
