= Oronero (song) =

Single by Giorgia

from the album Oronero
- Language: Italian
- Released: 30 September 2016
- Recorded: 2016
- Genre: Pop soul
- Length: 3:29
- Label: Sony Music
- Songwriter: Emanuel Lo Iacono
- Producer: Michele Canova

Giorgia singles chronology
"La mia stanza" (2014)	"Oronero" (2016)	"Vanità" (2017)

Music video
- "Oronero" on YouTube

"Oronero" is a song recorded by Italian singer Giorgia. The song was released on 30 September 2016 through Sony Music, as the lead single from her tenth studio album Oronero.

== Background and composition ==
After her ninth studio album Senza paura, published in 2013, Giorgia took her three years of break from recording new music. In September 2016, Giorgia announced the new song "Oronero" and her upcoming studio album. The song was written and composed by the singer's fiancé Emanuel Lo, with Michele Canova as producer.

== Music video ==
The music video for the song, directed by Emanuel Lo, was released on October 18, 2016, through the singer's YouTube channel.

== Charts ==
Chart performance for "Oronero"
Chart (2016)	Peak position
Italy (FIMI)	18
Italy Airplay (EarOne)	3

== Certifications ==
Certifications for "Oronero"
Region	Certification	Certified units/sales
Italy (FIMI)	Platinum	50,000^{‡}
^{‡} Sales+streaming figures based on certification alone.
