= Oronero =

Studio album by Giorgia
- Released: 28 October 2016
- Genre: Pop; R&B; soul
- Length: 49:13
- Label: Sony Music
- Producer: Michele Canova Iorfida

Giorgia chronology
Senza paura (2013)	Oronero (2016)	Pop Heart (2018)

Singles from Oronero
- 1. "Oronero" Released: 30 September 2016; 2. "Vanità" Released: 1 January 2017; 3. "Credo" Released: 14 April 2017; 4. "Scelgo ancora te" Released: 1 September 2017

Oronero (English: Black Gold) is the tenth studio album by Italian singer-songwriter Giorgia, released on 28 October 2016 by Sony Music.

The album peaked at number two of the Italian Albums Chart, being certified double platinum by FIMI. The album was promoted by several singles and the Oronero Live Tour, which was recorded for the live album Oronero Live, promoted by the collaboration "Come neve" with Marco Mengoni.

== Composition and themes ==
"It is a situation that affects us all, we move in a world where through social media we can say anything and talk about anything, communicate, confront each other, however, then there is a part of it all that becomes violent, almost out of obligation. This is where the metaphor of oil comes from, which in nature is not a bad thing, it is a resource, but misused it becomes a weapon, it becomes poison.

— Gioriga about the album conception

The album contains fifteen tracks, of which ten are co-written by Giorgia, plus numerous collaborations with Italian and international artists. The writers include the Italians Tony Maiello, Daniele Rea, Pacifico and the singers partner Emanuel Lo, as well as international collaborations with Allan Rich and Jud Friedman. In an interview with La Stampa, Giorgia explained the process behind the production of the album:

"With Michele we worked a lot on pre-production so that by the time we recorded we already knew what to keep and what to look for. [...] The lyrics reflect who I am with the fears and anxieties that we live in a world like this."

Musically the album was inspired by Beyoncé's vocal ability which is "on par with the rhythmic", Rihanna and Drake's R&B and Soul style. The album title refers to an Italian expression for identifying petrolio, or "black gold."

== Critics reception ==
Mattia Marzi of Rockol described the project as the synthesis between the previous projects, reconnecting "almost seamlessly, to the electropop and dance" of Dietro le apparenze and "to the more acoustic, played soul; [...] bringing Giorgia back to her comfort zone, to her territories" of Senza paura. Marzi indicated that the tracks "Posso farcela" and "Non fa niente" are two songs "in the background, almost on the sidelines" with respect to the record, emphasizing an "introverted and introspective attitude" of the singer, becoming "the most effective on the record."[21] Fabio Fiume of All Music Italia claimed that the singer is "enriched by a large group of American authors and musicians" who, with the help of Canova, produce sounds "intentionally electronic and certainly of international level." Fiume described the project "knowing and thoughtful" as it is the manifestation of "the testament of her current moment."

== Track listing ==
Oronero track listing
No.	Title	Lyrics	Music	Producer(s)	Length
1.	"Oronero"	Emanuel Lo Iacono	Lo Iacono	Michele Canova	3:32
2.	"Danza"	Giorgia Todrani	Matt Parad; Pete Nappi; Bryce Fox	Canova	3:16
3.	"Scelgo ancora te"	Todrani	Jana Ashley; Julio Rodriguez; Matthew Morales; James Morales	Canova	3:26
4.	"Credo"	Antonio Maiello	Maiello; Enrico Palmosi; Domenico Abate; Daniele Rea	Canova	2:56
5.	"Per non pensarti"	Todrani	Andrew Dorff; Tommy Lee James; Lucie Silvas	Canova	3:30
6.	"Vanità"	Todrani	Emma Rohan; Jez Ashurst	Canova	3:02
7.	"Posso farcela"	Todrani	Todrani	Canova	3:16
8.	"Come acrobati"	Lo Iacono	Lo Iacono	Canova	3:13
9.	"Mutevole"	Todrani	Marco Petriaggi; Alessandro Barocchi	Canova	3:43
10.	"Tolto e dato"	Lo Iacono	Lo Iacono	Canova	3:29
11.	"Amore quanto basta"	Todrani; Lo Iacono	Lo Iacono	Canova	3:35
12.	"Sempre si cambia"	Luigi De Crescenzo	De Crescenzo	Canova	3:34
13.	"Grande maestro"	Todrani	Canova; Nikki Flores; Sophie Hintze	Canova	2:54
14.	"Regina di notte"	Todrani	Todrani; Canova; Allan Rich; Jud Friedman	Canova	2:50
15.	"Non fa niente"	Todrani	Todrani	Canova	2:57

== Charts ==
=== Weekly charts ===
Chart (2016)	Peak position
Italian Albums (FIMI)	2
Swiss Albums (Schweizer Hitparade)	39

=== Year-end charts ===
Chart (2016)	Position
Italy (FIMI)	28
Chart (2017)	Position
Italy (FIMI)	26

== Certifications ==
Region	Certification	Certified units/sales
Italy (FIMI)	2× Platinum	100,000^{‡}
^{‡} Sales+streaming figures based on certification alone.
