= Karima (singer) =

Italian singer (born 1985)

- Born: 28 May 1985 (age 41); Livorno, Italy
- Genres: Pop; soul
- Occupation: Singer
- Instrument: Vocals
- Years active: 2003–present
- Labels: Sony Music (2009–2014); Universal (2015–present)

Karima Ammar Mouhoub (born 28 May 1985), known mononymously as Karima, is an Italian singer.

== Life and career ==
=== Amici di Maria De Filippi ===
Born to an Algerian father and an Italian mother, Karima, then a teenager, approached music in 1997, participating in Bravo Bravissimo and Domenica in. In October 2006, she was admitted to the sixth edition of Amici di Maria De Filippi. Ranked third, the singer won the critics' award given to her by journalists. In the same year she signed a recording contract with Sony BMG.

=== Sanremo Music Festival 2009 and Amare le differenze ===
In February 2009, Karima participated in the Sanremo Music Festival in the Proposals category, with the song Come in ogni ora. During the third night of the festival, Karima was accompanied on stage by Burt Bacharach and Mario Biondi, and ranked third. On 20 February 2009, Karima's debut EP Amare le differenze was released, which remained in the FIMI charts for 16 weeks, reaching 9th place. The second single from the EP was Come le foglie d'autunno. On 16 May of the same year, in Turin, she participated in Amici - La sfida dei talento, a show broadcast by Canale 5, hosted by Maria De Filippi, which saw the protagonists of the first eight editions of the talent show compete, and ranked second behind Anbeta Toromani, a dancer from the second edition.

On 21 June, Karima was one of the protagonists of Amiche per l'Abruzzo, a concert event at the San Siro stadium in Milan. The reinterpretation of Un'avventura together with Nicky Nicolai and Simona Molinari is included in the relative DVD released exactly one year later. The last months of 2009 see the singer busy with film dubbing, lending her voice to Naturi Naughton in the film Fame - Saranno famosi, released in Italian cinemas on 9 October, and performing the songs of Princess Tiana in the Disney classic The Princess and the Frog, released on 18 December. Among the songs that make up the soundtrack is the song Never Knew I Needed, performed in duet with Ne-Yo.

=== Karima and return to Amici "Big" ===
On 19 March 2010, the single Brividi e guai was released, which preceded the Karima's self-titled debut studio album, which was released on 13 April 2010 and was recorded entirely in Los Angeles under the direction of maestro Burt Bacharach. The album debuted at number 19 on the FIMI charts and remained there for 8 weeks. In the same year, She had the opportunity to open a concert for Whitney Houston. In support of the album, two other singles were released: Uno meno zero and Just Walk Away. From April to June 2010, Karima joined Maurizio Crozza as a regular guest on the comedy program Crozza Alive broadcast on La7, presenting the songs from her album and duetting with the comedian in famous songs reworked for satirical purposes. On 26 October 2010, the album Donne by Neri per Caso was released, consisting of a cappella duets, including the duet with Karima in Street Life.

Starting from 31 March 2012, Karima participated in a circuit, called big, dedicated to some former contestants from previous editions, in the evening of the eleventh edition of the program Amici di Maria De Filippi. She was eliminated in the first round of the second episode, on the evening of the repechage, on 14 April 2012.

In January 2013, Karima joined the regular cast of the sixth edition of the program I migliori anni, broadcast from January 19 to March 23 on Rai 1. On the final evening of the program, she ranked third in Canzonissima with the song I Will Always Love You by Whitney Houston, behind Marco Masini and Povia and first among the female singers in the competition.

=== Close to You, Tale e quale show and The Bodyguard musical ===
On 30 March 2015, five years after Karima's last album, the album Close to You - Karima Sings Bacharach was released under the Universal Music label, containing 13 covers of some of the most famous songs by the composer Burt Bacharach, rearranged in jazz, pop and R&B style. Karima presented the album in the last afternoon episode of the fourteenth edition of Amici di Maria De Filippi in which she sang the first single, Close to You. The album debuted at 64th position in the FIMI chart. From 11 September to 23 October 2015, she was a contestant on the programme Tale e quale show, hosted by Carlo Conti on Rai 1, finishing in the top 6 and then also taking part in the spin-off Tale e quale show - Il torneo together with the best of the previous edition, from 30 October to 20 November 2015, finally finishing in 8th place.

On 10 September 2016, Karima took part as a musical guest in the show Pintus Arena by comedian Angelo Pintus at the Verona Arena, which was broadcast on Italia 1 on 25 September. She was supposed to return in November 2016 as a competitor in the fifth edition of Tale e quale show - Il torneo but, on the eve of the first episode, she announced her withdrawal due to a health problem. A few days later, she underwent surgery on her vocal cords and, in the following weeks, she underwent a period of rehabilitation.

In early 2017, Karima took part in the musical The Bodyguard - Guardia del corpo, on stage at the Teatro Nazionale in Milan from 23 February to 7 May, playing the role of the protagonist Rachel Marron which in the original 1992 film was played by Whitney Houston.

=== First book ===
On 21 March 2022, Karima published her first book, an illustrated book for children entitled Il viaggio di Frida e Dario. A fable written according to the meditative model of the Chakras, typical of Yoga practice, and linked to the launch of a new single, Il viaggio.

== Personal life ==
In September 2013, Karima announced that she was expecting her first child with her partner; Frida was born on 13 January 2014.

== Discography ==
=== Studio albums ===
- 2010 – Karima
- 2015 – Close to You
- 2021 – No Filter
- 2022 – Karima Xmas

=== EPs ===
- 2009 – Amare le differenze

=== Singles ===
- 2009 – Come in ogni ora
- 2009 – Come le foglie d'autunno
- 2010 – Brividi e guai
- 2010 – Uno meno zero
- 2010 – Just Walk Away
- 2015 – Close to You

== Awards and nominations ==
- 2007 – Journalism Critics Award at Amici di Maria De Filippi
- 2009 – Wind Music Awards
