= Luca Napolitano =

Italian singer-songwriter (born 1986)

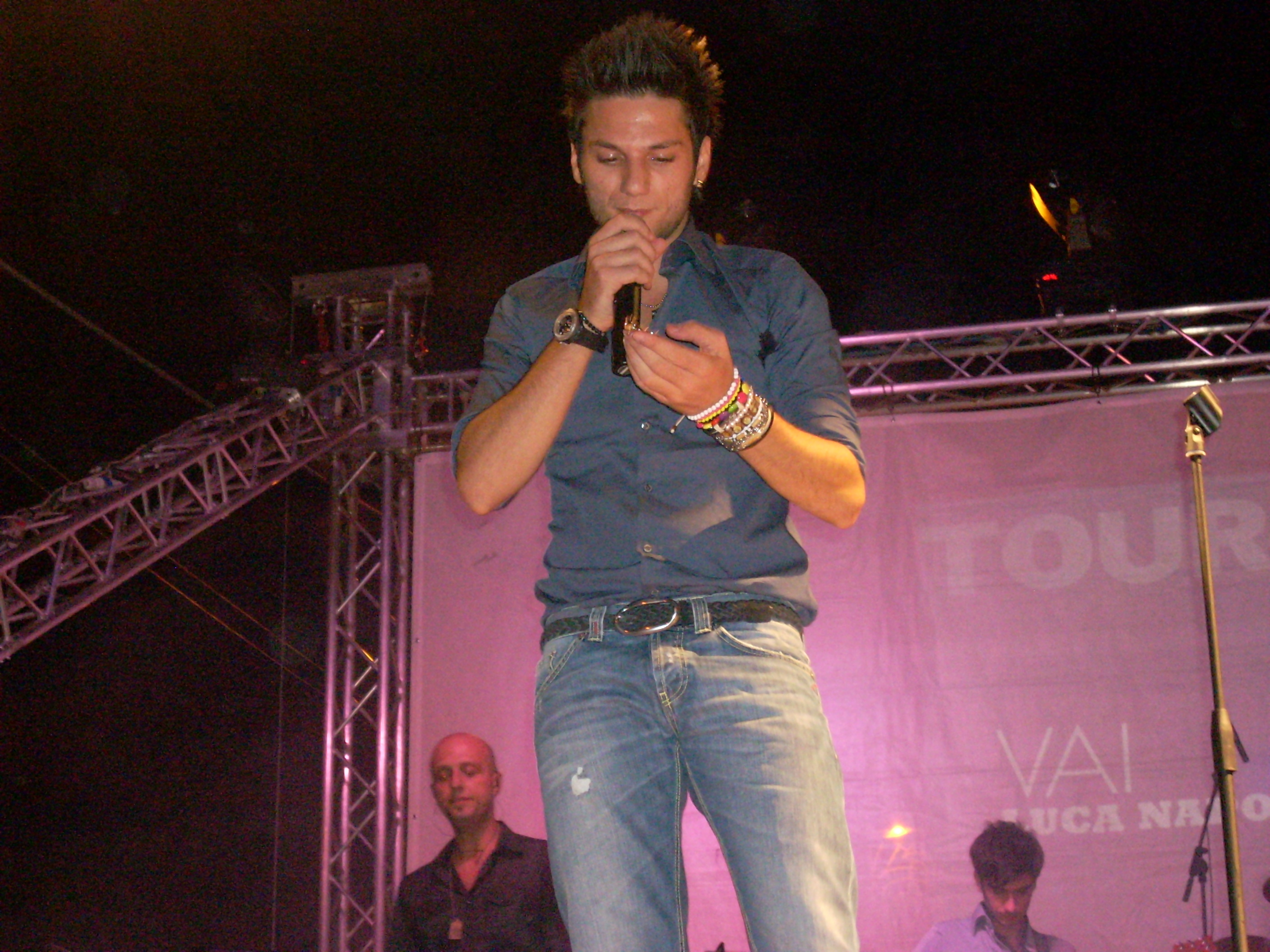
- Luca Napolitano

Background information
- Born: 5 May 1986 (age 40)
- Origin: Avellino, Italy
- Genres: Pop
- Occupations: Singer; songwriter
- Years active: 2008–present
- Label: Warner Music
- Website: lucanapolitano.it

Luca Napolitano (born 5 May 1986) is an Italian singer-songwriter.

== Career ==
In 2008, he joined the eighth edition of the Italian talent show Amici di Maria De Filippi, after four years of trying. He reached the final stage, and he finished in third place. He signed a contract with Warner Music, and he released his first EP Vai in 2009. The EP was certified gold, and it reached #5 in the Italian singles chart. He released three singles from the album with great success: Vai (#9 Italy), Forse forse (#5 Italy) and Da quando ti conosco.

In October, he released his first studio album L'infinito. The album reached #16 on the Italian chart and was certified gold. In May 2010, he was awarded at the "Wind Music Awards" for the sales of his first record Vai. In the summer, he was busy with L'infinito Tour for promoting the album. In October, he released a new single A Sud Di NY (featuring Federica Camba). The song had anticipated the release of the EP Di Me that debuted at #16 on the chart.

== Discography ==
=== Albums/Ep's ===
Year	Title	Position		Certified
Year	Title	ITA	CH	Certified
2009	Vai (EP)	5	—	Gold
2009	L'infinito	16	—	—
2010	Di me (EP)	16	—	—
2011	Fino a tre	22	84	—

=== Singles ===
Year	Title	Position		Album
Year	Title	ITA	CH	Album
2009	Vai	9	—	Vai
2009	Forse forse	5	—	Vai
2009	Da quando ti conosco	—	—	Vai
2009	L'infinito	—	—	L'infinito
2010	A sud di NY (feat. Federica Camba)	—	—	Di Me
2011	Fino a tre (Tourn around) (duet with TinkaBelle)	—	58	Fino a tre
2011	Risvegli	—	—	Fino a tre

== Filmography ==
- A Sud di New York (2010, Directed by Elena Bonelli)
