= Emanuel Lo =

Italian dancer and singer (born 1978)

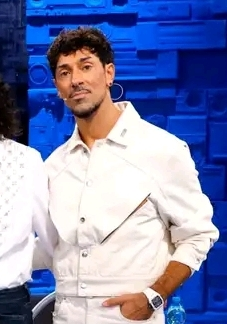
- Emanuel Lo in 2024

Background information
- Born: Emanuel Lo Iacono; 11 July 1979 (age 47)
- Origin: Rome, Lazio, Italy
- Genres: Hip hop; R&B
- Occupations: Dancer; choreographer; musician; director
- Instrument: Vocals
- Years active: 1996–present
- Labels: Dischi di Cioccolata; Sony Music

Emanuel Lo Iacono (born 11 July 1979), known professionally as Emanuel Lo, is an Italian dancer, choreographer, musician, and music video director.

== Biography ==
Passionate about music since he was a child (he started playing the guitar at the age of ten), he also devoted himself to dance. In 1996 he made his debut on RAI and Mediaset, where he worked as a dancer and co-choreographer in various television programs, including Stasera pago io with Fiorello, "Uno di noi" with Gianni Morandi, "La notte vola" with Lorella Cuccarini, the Sanremo Festival with Simona Ventura, Carràmba! Che sorpresa with Raffaella Carrà, and Domenica in with Amadeus. He works performing both in Italy and abroad in tours and at major events for artists such as Kylie Minogue, Paola & Chiara, Geri Halliwell, Robbie Williams, Ricky Martin, Holly Valance, Luciano Pavarotti, Samantha Mumba and many others.

In 2006 he performed as a supporter for international artists such as Kanye West, Lee Ryan, and Coolio. His recording debut dates back to February 2007 with the single "Woofer", in collaboration with the rapper Tormento. In the same year, on May 18, his debut album Più tempo was released, produced by Giorgia for the record label Dischi di Cioccolata and distributed by Sony Music. He subsequently worked on Giorgia's album Stonata, released in November 2007, as co-author of the lyrics of some songs, including the duet of Giorgia and Mina "Poche parole". In 2009, his second album, Cambio tutto, was released, again for distribution by Sony Music, born from a collaboration with the beat-maker Big Fish. The album, which contaminates R&B and hip hop, contains the song "Cambio tutto" written by the singer-songwriter Nesli.

In 2010 Emanuel took care of the choreography of the latest edition of the talent show X Factor on RAI. In 2011 he wrote the lyrics and music for some of Giorgia's very successful Dietro le apparenze, including "Il mio giorno migliore", "Dove sei" and "Sembra impossibile". Also in 2011 he established himself as a director with VisionariLab, shooting many videoclips with numerous artists such as José Carreras, Clementino, Ornella Vanoni, Giorgia, Deddy, Giordana Angi, Sal Da Vinci, and Giulia Luzi. In 2013 he collaborated on Giorgia's new album, Senza paura, writing lyrics and music for seven songs. In 2016 he wrote the lyrics and music for four songs included in Giorgia's tenth album of unreleased songs, "Oronero", including the first single and title track Oronero.

From 31 October 2016 he joined Maria De Filippi's talent show Amici, covering the role of hip hop judge in the external challenges. In the following years, he held the role of external judge within the program and then replaced Veronica Peparini as a teacher from the 2022–2023 edition, remaining also in the 2023–2024 and 2024–2025 editions.

On September 1, 2017, he directed the single "Scelgo ancora te" by Giorgia, in which Emanuel Lo appears as co-star together with Giorgia and her son Samuel. The video was presented in absolute preview on TG1 by Vincenzo Mollica. He signed various artistic directions including Porsche events and tours of Giorgia, J-Ax and Fedez.

== Personal life ==
Since 2004 he has been officially engaged to the singer Giorgia; the two met for the first time during the tour for the album Ladra di Vento in 2003 (Emanuel was part of the dance troupe). On February 18, 2010 their son named Samuel was born.

== Discography ==
=== Studio albums ===
- 2007 – Più tempo
- 2009 – Cambio tutto

=== Singles ===
- 2007 – "Woofer" (feat. Tormento)

== Television programs ==
Year	Title	Network	Notes
2010	X Factor	Rai 1	Choreographer
2016–2017, 2022–present	Amici di Maria De Filippi	Canale 5	Dance teacher

== Videoclip ==
As director of Visionarilab

Year	Title	Author	Notes
2012	"Senza un motivo"	Sal Da Vinci feat. Ornella Vanoni	Director and choreographer
2012	"Tu mi porti su"	Giorgia	Director and choreographer
2012	"Dove sei"	Giorgia	Director and choreographer
2014	"Non mi ami"	Giorgia	Director and choreographer
2014	"Io fra tanti"	Giorgia	Director and choreographer
2014	"La mia stanza"	Giorgia	Director and choreographer
2017	"Scelgo ancora te"	Giorgia	Director and choreographer
2018	"Una storia importante"	Giorgia	
2018	"I Feel Love"	Giorgia	
2022	"Le cose che non dico"	Giordana Angi	Director and choreographer
2022	"Un autunno fa"	Giordana Angi	Director and choreographer
2023	"Parole dette male"	Giorgia	
2023	"Senza confine"	Giorgia	
