= Amici di Maria De Filippi =

Italian talent show series produced since 2001

- Also known as: Amici
- Created by: Maria De Filippi
- Presented by: Daniele Bossari (2001); Maria De Filippi (2002-present)
- Judges: Giuseppe Vessicchio; Luca Pitteri; Maurizio Pica; Garrison Rochelle; Maura Paparo; Fioretta Mari; Claudio Insegno; Nora Orlandi; Steve La Chance; Rossella Brescia; Patrick Rossi Gastaldi; Grazia Di Michele; Alessandra Celentano; Rino Cassano; Fabrizio Palma; Daniela Allegra; Paolo Asso; Luca Jurman; Mauro Astolfi; Gabriella Scalise; Giuseppe Carbone; Kris; Marco Garofalo; Michele Villanova; Loretta Martinez; Charlie Rapino; Sergio La Stella; Carl Portal; Luciano Cannito; Rudy Zerbi; Maria Grazia Fontana; Dado Parisini; Mara Maionchi; Carlo Di Francesco; Klaus Bonoldi; Kledi Kadiu; Veronica Peparini; Francesco Sarcina; Fabrizio Moro; Alex Braga; Marco Maccarini; Natalia Titova; Boosta; Emanuel Lo; Giusy Ferreri; Paola Turci; Bill Goodson; Stash; Anna Pettinelli; Timor Steffens; Arisa; Lorella Cuccarini; Raimondo Todaro; Deborah Lettieri; Amadeus; Samurai Jay; Ambra Angiolini
- Country of origin: Italy
- No. of seasons: 26
- No. of episodes: 689

Production
- Producer: Fascino P.G.T. s.r.l.

Original release
- Network: Italia 1 (2001–2003); Canale 5 (2002–present); Real Time (2014–2020, only day-time)
- Release: 17 September 2001 – present

Amici di Maria De Filippi, known simply as Amici and until 2003 as Saranno famosi, is an Italian talent show. Created by Maria De Filippi, the show began in 2001 and has since aired annually. The show is produced by Fascino P.G.T. s.r.l. (owned by De Filippi) and is broadcast on Canale 5. Since the thirteenth edition, daytime and casting have been broadcast on the television network Real Time and on the online streaming platform Witty TV by Fascino.

Amici is an academy school involving a class of about 20 young students (16–30 age), who aspire to become professional singers, songwriters and dancers (ballet, modern, contemporary, latin and hip-hop). Additional original categories of "actors", "musicians" and "TV presenters" have since been dropped after 2009.

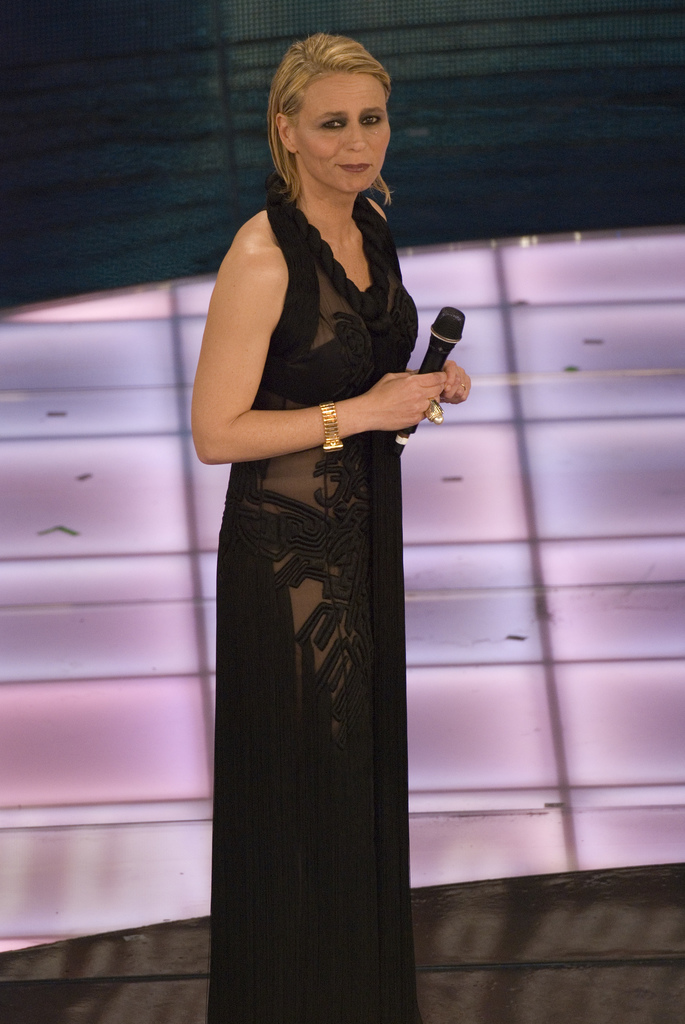
Maria De Filippi in 2009

== Series overview ==
Series	Episodes	Originally released		Winner
Series	Episodes	First released	Last released	Winner
1	33	15 September 2001	21 May 2002	Dennis Fantina
2	35	14 September 2002	27 May 2003	Giulia Ottonello
3	33	20 September 2003	23 May 2004	Leon Cino
4	30	11 September 2004	21 April 2005	Antonino Spadaccino
5	28	10 September 2005	26 March 2006	Ivan D'Andrea
6	21	14 October 2006	11 March 2007	Federico Angelucci
7	25	20 October 2007	16 April 2008	Marco Carta
8	24	5 October 2008	25 March 2009	Alessandra Amoroso
9	24	26 September 2009	29 March 2010	Emma
10	22	2 October 2010	6 March 2011	Denny Lodi / Virginio Simonelli
11	32	1 October 2011	19 May 2012	Giuseppe Giofrè / Gerardo Pulli
12	24	24 November 2012	1 June 2013	Moreno
13	24	23 November 2013	27 May 2014	Deborah Iurato
14	25	22 November 2014	5 June 2015	The Kolors
15	25	21 November 2015	25 May 2016	Sergio Sylvestre
16	24	19 November 2016	27 May 2017	Andreas Müller
17	27	18 November 2017	11 June 2018	Irama
18	25	17 November 2018	25 May 2019	Alberto Urso
19	18	16 November 2019	3 April 2020	Gaia
20	26	14 November 2020	15 May 2021	Giulia Stabile
21	33	19 September 2021	15 May 2022	Luigi Strangis
22	34	18 September 2022	14 May 2023	Mattia Zenzola
23	34	24 September 2023	18 May 2024	Sarah Toscano
24	32	29 September 2024	18 May 2025	Daniele Doria
25	32	28 September 2025	17 May 2026	Lorenzo Salvetti
26	2	11 October 2026	TBA	TBA

== Cast ==
=== Singing teachers ===
Singing teachers
Teacher	Category	Seasons																									
Teacher	Category	1	2	3	4	5	6	7	8	9	10	11	12	13	14	15	16	17	18	19	20	21	22	23	24	25	26
Giuseppe Vessicchio	Music																										
Luca Pitteri	Singing																										
Maurizio Pica	Guitar																										
Nora Orlandi	Singing																										
Grazia Di Michele	Singing																										
Fabrizio Palma	Singing																										
Luca Jurman	Singing																										
Gabriella Scalise	Singing																										
Loretta Martinez	Singing																										
Charlie Rapino	Singing																										
Sergio La Stella	Opera																										
Maria Grazia Fontana	Singing																										
Dado Parisini	Singing																										
Rudy Zerbi	Singing																										
Mara Maionchi	Singing																										
Carlo Di Francesco	Singing																										
Klaus Bonoldi	Singing																										
Francesco Sarcina	Singing																										
Marco Maccarini	Singing																										
Fabrizio Moro	Singing																										
Alex Braga	Singing																										
Boosta	Singing																										
Giusy Ferreri	Singing																										
Paola Turci	Singing																										
Alex Britti	Singing																										
Stash	Guitar																										
Anna Pettinelli	Singing																										
Arisa	Singing																										
Lorella Cuccarini	Singing																										
Amadeus	Singing																										
Samurai Jay	Singing																										

=== Dance teachers ===
Dance teachers
Teacher	Category	Seasons																									
Teacher	Category	1	2	3	4	5	6	7	8	9	10	11	12	13	14	15	16	17	18	19	20	21	22	23	24	25	26
Garrison Rochelle	Jazz																										
Maura Paparo	Hip hop																										
Steve La Chance	Jazz																										
Rossella Brescia	Ballet																										
Alessandra Celentano	Ballet																										
Mauro Astolfi	Contemporary																										
Giuseppe Garbone	Jazz																										
Kris	Hip hop																										
Marco Garofalo	Jazz																										
Michele Villanova	Ballet																										
Carl Portal	Jazz																										
Luciano Cannito	Neoclassical																										
Kledi Kadiu	Contemporary																										
Veronica Peparini	Contemporary																										
Natalia Titova	Latin																										
Emanuel Lo	Hip hop																										
Bill Goodson	Contemporary																										
Timor Steffens	Hip hop																										
Lorella Cuccarini	Musical																										
Raimondo Todaro	Latin																										
Deborah Lettieri	Jazz																										
Ambra Angiolini	Video dance																										

=== Sports teachers ===
Sports teachers
Teacher	Category	Seasons
Teacher	Category	26
Giovanni De Carolis	Boxe	
Alice Bellandi	Judo	
Luca Lucaroni	Figure skating	

=== Acting teachers ===
Acting teachers
Teacher	Category	Seasons								
Teacher	Category	1	2	3	4	5	6	7	8	9
Fioretta Mari	Acting and diction									
Claudio Insegno	Acting									
Patrick Rossi	Acting									
Rino Cassano	Acting									
Daniela Allegra	Acting									
Paolo Asso	Acting									

=== Non-judging teachers ===
Collaborators
Teacher	Category	Seasons																								
Teacher	Category	1	2	3	4	5	6	7	8	9	10	11	12	13	14	15	16	17	18	19	20	21	22	23	24	25
Jill Cooper	Fitness																									
Giuseppe Giannini	Football																									
Martino Vertova	Art																									
Paolo Evangelista	Fitness																									
Marco Castellano	Fitness																									
Aldo Busi	Music history																									
Jury Chechi	Gymnastics																									
Pamela Prati	Stage presence																									
Pino Perris	Singing																									
Mauro Coruzzi	Music history																									
Gabriella Scalise	Singing																									
Fabrizio Palma	Singing																									
Carlo Palmas	Singing																									
Eric Buffat	Singing																									
Antonio Galbiati	Singing																									
Nancy Berti	Latin dance																									
Giovanni Lori	Singing																									
Daniele Baldi	Hip hop dance																									
Denis Bragato	Jazz dance																									
Fabrizio Prolli	Jazz dance																									
Federica Angelozzi	Contact dance																									
Roberto Vecchioni	Music history																									
Amilcar Gonzalez	Ballet																									
Raffella Misiti	Singing																									
Enzo Campagnoli	Singing																									
Danilo Grano	Jazz dance																									
Alessandro Merli	Rap																									
Mattia Galante	Jazz dance																									
Roberto Angelini	Singing																									
Annalisa	Singing																									
Michele Bravi	Singing																									
Natalia Titova	Latin dance																									
Giovanni Caccamo	Singing																									
Emanuel Lo	Hip hop dance																									
Elena D'Amario	Jazz dance																									
Martina Nadalini	Jazz dance																									
Alfonso Signorini	Music history																									
Mattia Tuzzolino	Video dance																									
Alberto Montesso	Ballet																									
Emanuela Cortesi	Singing																									
Cecilia Cesario	Singing																									
Marcello Sacchetta	Jazz dance																									
Alberto Urso	Singing																									
Agnese Valle	Singing																									
Antonella Cilenti	Singing																									
Chiara Calderare	Singing																									
Umberto Gaudino	Latin dance																									
Spillo	Hip hop dance																									
Andreas Müller	Hip hop dance																									
Francesco Porcelluzzi	Jazz dance																									
Angelo Recchia	Heels dance																									
Simone Nolasco	Jazz dance																									
Lalla Francia	Singing																									
Federica Soncin	Hip hop dance																									
Arianna Forte	Hip hop dance																									
Giordana Angi	Singing																									
Samantha Togni	Latin dance																									
Mattia Zenzola	Latin dance																									
Alessia Pecchia	Latin dance																									
Michele Lanzeroti	Jazz dance																									

=== Coaches (final stage) ===
Color key
Featured as a main coach.
Featured as a part-time coach.

Coaches (final stage)
Coach	Seasons													
Coach	12	13	14	15	16	17	18	19	20	21	22	23	24	25
Emma														
Miguel Bosé														
Eleonora Abbagnato														
Moreno														
Elisa														
J-Ax														
Nek														
Morgan														
Ricky Martin														
Vittorio Grigolo														
Fabio Rovazzi														
Alessandra Celentano														
Rudy Zerbi														
Lorella Cuccarini														
Veronica Peparini														
Anna Pettinelli														
Arisa														
Raimondo Todaro														
Emanuel Lo														
Deborah Lettieri														

=== Judges (final stage) ===
Judges (final stage)
Judge	Seasons													
Judge	12	13	14	15	16	17	18	19	20	21	22	23	24	25
Gabry Ponte														
Luca Argentero														
Sabrina Ferilli														
Francesco Renga														
Renato Zero														
Loredana Bertè														
Anna Oxa														
Morgan														
Ermal Meta														
Ambra Angiolini														
Daniele Liotti														
Eleonora Abbagnato														
Emma														
Elisa														
Heather Parisi														
Giulia Michelini														
Simona Ventura														
Marco Bocci														
Alessandra Amoroso														
Arisa														
Michelle Hunziker														
Gerry Scotti														
Mara Venier														
J-Ax														
Antonella Clerici														
Romina Power														
Ilary Blasi														
Silvia Toffanin														
Alessia Marcuzzi														
Vanessa Incontrada														
Christian De Sica														
Stash														
Emanuele Filiberto														
Stefano De Martino														
Cristiano Malgioglio														
Michele Bravi														
Giuseppe Giofrè														
Amadeus														
Elena D'Amario														
Gigi D'Alessio														

=== Dance crew ===
Dance crew
Dancer	Seasons																								
Dancer	1	2	3	4	5	6	7	8	9	10	11	12	13	14	15	16	17	18	19	20	21	22	23	24	25
Marta Angelin																									
Rossella Brescia																									
Kledi Kadiu																									
Ilir Shaqiri																									
Valerio Pino																									
Maria Zaffino																									
Francesca Di Maio																									
Michele Oliva																									
Massimo Sansottera																									
David Sellings																									
Anbeta Toromani																									
Josè Perez																									
Leon Cino																									
Fabrizio Mainini																									
Gianni Sperti																									
Adelaide Seeney																									
Eleonora Scopelliti																									
Francesco Mariottini																									
Amilcar Gonzalez																									
Martina Nadalini																									
Arduino Beroncello																									
Marbelys Zamora																									
Antonio Fiore																									
Michele Viola																									
Stefano De Martino																									
Hugo Cortes																									
Michele Barile																									
Santo Giuliano																									
Marcello Sacchetta																									
Sabatino D'Eustacchio																									
Giada Lini																									
Sacha Storto																									
Simone Nolasco																									
Elena D'Amario																									
Giuseppe Giofrè																									
Klaudia Pepa																									
Irene Tavassi																									
Francesca Tocca																									
Federica Panzeri																									
Lorella Boccia																									
Lorenzo Del Moro																									
Andreas Müller																									
Sebastian Melo Taveira																									
Giulia Pauselli																									
Virginia Tomarchio																									
Gabriele Esposito																									
Angelo Recchia																									
Bryan Ramirez																									
Dante Gerlo																									
Umberto Gaudino																									
Alessio La Padula																									
Spillo																									
Andrea Condorelli																									
Vanessa Cavedoni																									
Giulia Stabile																									
Vincenzo Durevole																									
Beatrice Mechilli																									
Cecilia Borghese																									
Alessandro Macario																									
Elisa Brunetti																									
Carlotta Di Monte																									
Michele Esposito																									
Talisa Ravagnani																									
Federico Milan																									
Federica Soncin																									
Mariagrazia Tallei																									
Isobel Kinnear																									
Georgie Curreli-Rose																									
Luca Curreli-Rose																									
Mattia Zenzola																									
Michele Lanzeroti																									
Alessio Gaudino																									
Alessio Cavaliere																									
Francesco Fasano																									
Alessia Pecchia																									
Chiara Bacci																									

=== Notable guests ===
- During the seasons a lot of notable guests, including professional actors, musicians, and dancers appeared as guest judges or performers such as John Travolta, Robert De Niro, Carla Fracci, Raffaella Carrà, Matthew McConaughey, Kylie Minogue, James Blunt, Al Pacino, Sophia Loren, Kevin Spacey, Michael Douglas, Mariah Carey, Gino Paoli, LP, Sumi Jo, Matt Dillon, Filippo Magnini, Luis Fonsi, Owen Wilson, t.A.T.u., Paddy Jones, Laura Pausini, Alice Merton, Patrick Dempsey, Il Volo, Carlo Verdone, Jasmine Thompson, Umberto Tozzi, Anastacia, Diego Maradona, Amy Macdonald, Gianna Nannini, Clean Bandit, Francesco De Gregori, Ricky Martin, Tiziano Ferro, Sheppard, Plácido Domingo, Skunk Anansie, Robert Pattinson and Zendaya.

== Contestants ==
Table key
Key	Description
	Winner
	Finalist
	Retired / Expelled

=== Season 1 (2001–2002) ===
- Teachers: Giuseppe Vessicchio, Luca Pitteri, Maurizio Pica, Garrison Rochelle, Maura Paparo, Fioretta Mari, Claudio Insegno

==== Final stage ====
Position	Contestant	Type
1	Dennis Fantina	Singer
2	Marianna Scarci	Dancer
3	Ermanno Rossi	Dancer
4	Antonio Baldes	Dancer
5	Andrea Cardillo	Singer-songwriter
6	Leonardo Fumarola	Dancer
7	Valeria Monetti	Actress
8	Claudia Mannoni	Dancer
9	Antonella Loconsole	Singer
10	Alessandro Vigilante	Dancer
11	Maria Pia Pizzola	Singer
12	Monica Hill	Singer
13	Renato Sannio	Actor
14	Paolo Idolo	Actor and singer
15	Miriam Della Guardia	Dancer
16	Clementina Giacente	Dancer
17	Michael Calandra	Singer
18	Miriam Castorina	Singer
19	Gianluigi Garretta	Actor

==== Initial stage ====
Alessia Natale (dancer); Alessandra Piras (dancer); Alfredo "Fred" Avitaia (actor); Chiara Bigioni (dancer); Dalila Timaco (dancer); Daniela Romano (dancer); Erika Parisi (dancer); Francesca Caselli (singer); Francesco Giannini (singer); Gabriele Carbotti (singer); Gian Marco Careddu (singer-songwriter); Giuseppe Giannico (singer); Graziano Pimpolari (singer-songwriter); Irene Humburg (actress); Marco Campanale (singer); Marco Maestrelli (actor); Mario Crocetta (dancer); Manuele Morroni (singer); Mirna Brancotti (singer); Pierpaolo Astolfi (actor); Stefano Veronese (dancer); Zita Fusco (actress)

=== Season 2 (2002–2003) ===
- Teachers: Giuseppe Vessicchio, Luca Pitteri, Nora Orlandi, Garrison Rochelle, Maura Paparo, Steve La Chance, Rossella Brescia, Fioretta Mari, Patrick Rossi Gastaldi

==== Final stage ====
Position	Contestant	Type
1	Giulia Ottonello	Singer
2	Anbeta Toromani	Dancer
3	Timothy Snell	Singer
4	Lidia Cocciolo	Singer
5	Michele Maddaloni	Dancer
6	Federico Patrizi	Dancer
7	Marta Gerbi	Singer
8	Maria Stefania DiRenzo	Dancer
9	Enrico Pittari	Actor
10	Leonardo Di Minno	Singer
11	Daniele Perrino	Singer
12	Stefano Bindinelli	Dancer
13	Augusto Da Graça	Dancer
14	Danilo Grano	Dancer
15	Jennifer Iacono	Dancer
16	Elena Novaresi	Dancer
17	Samantha Discolpa	Singer
18	Terry Paternoster	Actress
19	Fausto Monteforte	Dancer
20	Roberta Mengozzi	Actress

==== Initial stage ====
Andrea Veschini (singer); Antonio Grosso (singer); Consuelo Varini (singer); Ettore Romano (singer); Fabio Villanis (singer); Fabio Morici (actor); Francesca Paganucci (singer); Giacomo Milli (dancer); Giovanna Martini (actress); Luca Basto (dancer); Luca Militello (singer); Marcella Di Vita (singer); Salvatore Andreoli (singer); Sara Donadelli (dancer)

=== Season 3 (2003–2004) ===
- Teachers: Giuseppe Vessicchio, Luca Pitteri, Grazia Di Michele, Garrison Rochelle, Maura Paparo, Steve La Chance, Alessandra Celentano, Fioretta Mari, Patrick Rossi Gastaldi, Rino Cassano

==== Final stage ====
Position	Contestant	Type
1	Leon Cino	Dancer
2	Sabrina Ghio	Dancer
3	Samantha Fantauzzi	Actress
4	Gianluca De Martini	Singer
5	Olti Shaqiri	Dancer
6	Francesco Capodacqua	Singer
7	Anna Dalton	Actress
8	Sabatino D'Eustacchio	Dancer
9	Francesca Dario	Dancer
10	Alessia Orlandi	Singer
11	Federica Gargani	Dancer
12	Salvatore Vinci	Singer
13	Valerio Di Rocco	Singer
14	Irene Guglielmi	Singer
15	Gianluca Merolli	Singer
16	Simone Benedetti	Dancer
17	Giorgia Minella	Dancer
18	Antonio Guida	Dancer
19	Sarah Jane Olog	Singer
20	Sara Pamploni	Dancer
21	Giorgia Galassi	Singer
22	Ornella Pellegrino	Singer
23	Rosaria Laconte	Dancer
24	Laura Piunti	Singer
25	Rocco Pietrantonio	Actor
26	Catello Miotto	Singer

==== Initial stage ====
Alessia Pizzichemi (dancer); Danilo Musci (dancer); Emanuela Boldetti (dancer); Emiliano D'Angelo (dancer); Katia Ancelotti (singer); Maria Letizia Arcudi (dancer); Martina Ardizzoni (singer); Michael Schermi (actor); Morena Martini (singer); Nicola Traversa (singer-songwriter); Raffaella Iavarone (dancer)

=== Season 4 (2004–2005) ===
- Teachers: Giuseppe Vessicchio, Luca Pitteri, Grazia Di Michele, Fabrizio Palma, Garrison Rochelle, Maura Paparo, Steve La Chance, Alessandra Celentano, Fioretta Mari, Patrick Rossi Gastaldi, Rino Cassano

==== Final stage ====
Position	Contestant	Type
1	Antonino Spadaccino	Singer
2	Francesco De Simone	Dancer
3	Klajdi Selimi	Dancer
4	Romina Carancini	Dancer
5	Marco Vannini	Actor
6	Maddalena Sorrentino	Singer
7	Debora Terenzi	Actress
8	Marta Di Giulio	Dancer
9	Tili Lukaj	Dancer
10	Pietro Napolano	Singer
11	Piero Romitelli	Singer
12	Antonello Carrozza	Singer
13	Valeria Belleudi	Singer
14	Antonio Fiore	Dancer
15	Massimiliano Piroti	Dancer
16	Alberto Galetti	Dancer
17	Rosanna Cestra	Singer
18	Maria Grazia Testaferrata	Singer
19	Alessia Ramazzotti	Actress
20	Simona Annese	Dancer

==== Initial stage ====
Alessandro Rende (dancer); Alexandra Fiaschini (singer); Antonio Propato (singer); Antonio Tagnani (singer); Claudia Dongu (dancer); Claudia Gusmano (actress); Immacolata Allozzi (singer); Mariangela Cafagna (dancer); Marika Vezzola (singer); Michele Manfredini (dancer); Thomas Grazioso (singer); Valentina Campani (dancer); Veronica Montali (singer)

=== Season 5 (2005–2006) ===
- Teachers: Giuseppe Vessicchio, Luca Pitteri, Grazia Di Michele, Fabrizio Palma, Garrison Rochelle, Maura Paparo, Steve La Chance, Alessandra Celentano, Fioretta Mari, Patrick Rossi Gastaldi, Daniela Allegra

==== Final stage ====
Position	Contestant	Type
1	Ivan D'Andrea	Dancer
2	Andrea Dianetti	Actor
3	Rita Comisi	Singer
4	Eleonora Crupi	Singer
5	Raffaele Tizzano	Dancer
6	Erion Baze	Dancer
7	Rossella Lucà	Dancer
8	Manola Moslehi	Singer
9	Nicola Gargaglia	Singer
10	Luana Guidara	Dancer
11	Roberto Carrozzino	Dancer
12	Robert Iaboni	Actor
13	Giuseppe Landi	Singer
14	Michele Moretti	Dancer
15	Endri Roshi	Dancer
16	Roberta Zegretti	Dancer
17	Matteo Deledda	Singer
18	Erika Mineo	Singer

==== Initial stage ====
Alberto Poletti (dancer); Albina Bondarenko (dancer); Annavita Romano (dancer); Antonello Mastrangelo (dancer); Brigida Cacciatore (singer); Fabio De Martino (singer); Filomena Caciapuoti (singer); Giovanni Fusco (dancer); Giuseppe Forlini (singer); Luca Borro (singer); Serena Silvani (actress); Viviana Filippello (dancer)

=== Season 6 (2006–2007) ===
- Teachers: Giuseppe Vessicchio, Luca Pitteri, Grazia Di Michele, Fabrizio Palma, Garrison Rochelle, Maura Paparo, Steve La Chance, Alessandra Celentano, Fioretta Mari, Patrick Rossi Gastaldi, Paolo Asso

==== Final stage ====
Position	Contestant	Type
1	Federico Angelucci	Singer
2	Agata Reale	Dancer
3	Karima	Singer
4	Cristo Martines	Dancer
5	Max Orsi	Singer
6	Giulia Franceschini	Singer
7	Tony Aglianò	Dancer
8	Jessica Villotta	Dancer
9	Federica Capuano	Actress
10	Manuel Aspidi	Singer-songwriter
11	Roberta Miolla	Dancer
12	Salvatore Dello Iacolo	Dancer
13	Bambi Zamfir	Gymnast
14	Santo Giuliano	Dancer

==== Initial stage ====
Alessio Paddeu (singer); Chiara Martegiani (actress); Corinne Marchini (singer); Emanuel Caserio (actor); Michi Pohoata (gymnast); Pamela Buggiani (dancer); Stefano Villani (singer)

=== Season 7 (2007–2008) ===
- Teachers: Giuseppe Vessicchio, Grazia Di Michele, Fabrizio Palma, Luca Jurman, Garrison Rochelle, Maura Paparo, Steve La Chance, Alessandra Celentano, Fioretta Mari, Patrick Rossi Gastaldi, Paolo Asso

==== Final stage ====
Position	Contestant	Type
1	Marco Carta	Singer
2	Roberta Bonanno	Singer
3	Pasqualino Maione	Singer-songwriter
4	Francesco Mariottini	Dancer
5	Susy Fuccillo	Dancer
6	Marta Rossi	Singer
7	Cassandra De Rosa	Singer
8	Giulia Piana	Dancer
9	Giuseppe Salsetta	Singer
10	Gennaro Siciliano	Dancer
11	Simonetta Spiri	Singer-songwriter
12	Antonino Lombardo	Dancer
13	Maria Luigia La Rocca	Singer
14	Marina Marchione	Actress

==== Initial stage ====
Alessandra Valenti (dancer); Cristina Da Villanova (dancer); Gianluca Conversano (dancer); Luca Barbagallo (dancer); Mattia De Salve (dancer); Saverio D'Amelio (actor); Sebastiano Formica (actor); Valentina Tarsitano (dancer); Vincenzo Mingolla (dancer)

=== Season 8 (2008–2009) ===
- Teachers: Giuseppe Vessicchio, Grazia Di Michele, Fabrizio Palma, Luca Jurman, Gabriella Scalise, Garrison Rochelle, Maura Paparo, Steve La Chance, Alessandra Celentano, Mauro Astolfi, Fioretta Mari, Patrick Rossi Gastaldi

==== Final stage ====
Position	Contestant	Type
1	Alessandra Amoroso	Singer
2	Valerio Scanu	Singer
3	Luca Napolitano	Singer-songwriter
4	Alice Bellagamba	Dancer
5	Pedro Gonzalez	Dancer
6	Mario Nunziante	Singer-songwriter
7	Martina Stavolo	Singer
8	Adriano Bettinelli	Dancer
9	Silvia Olari	Singer-songwriter
10	Domenico Primotici	Dancer
11	Daniela Stradaioli	Dancer
12	Jennifer Milan	Singer
13	Andreina Caracciolo	Dancer
14	Gianluca Lanzillotta	Dancer

==== Initial stage ====
Angelo Marotta (actor); Arturo Caccavale (singer); Beatrice Zancanaro (dancer); Carlo De Martino (dancer); Daniele Smeraldi (singer); Francesca Maiozzi (dancer); Francesco Di Nicola (singer); Iacopo Di Stefano (singer); Leonardo Marki Monteiro (dancer); Pamela Scarponi (singer); Piero Campanale (actor); Serena Carassai (dancer)

=== Season 9 (2009–2010) ===
- Teachers: Giuseppe Vessicchio, Grazia Di Michele, Gabriella Scalise, Charlie Rapino, Loretta Martinez, Pino Perris, Sergio La Stella, Garrison Rochelle, Steve La Chance, Alessandra Celentano, Marco Garofalo, Kris, Giuseppe Carbone, Patrick Rossi Gastaldi

==== Final stage ====
Position	Contestant	Type
1	Emma	Singer
2	Loredana Errore	Singer
3	Pierdavide Carone	Singer-songwriter
4	Matteo Macchioni	Singer
5	Stefano De Martino	Dancer
6	Elena D'Amario	Dancer
7	Rodrigo Gonzalez	Dancer
8	Enrico Nigiotti	Singer-songwriter
9	Grazia Striano	Dancer
10	Michele Barile	Dancer
11	Borana Qrjazi	Dancer
12	Stefano Maiuolo	Singer
13	Angelo Iossa	Singer
14	Anna Altieri	Singer

==== Initial stage ====
Antonio Sisca (dancer); Arianna Mereu (singer); Denis Mascia (singer); Gabriele Manzo (dancer); Giorgio Miceli (dancer); Januaria Carito (singer); Maddalena Malizia (dancer); Nicholas Poggiali (dancer); Nicolò Marchionni (dancer); Riccardo Occhilupo (dancer); Rosolino Schillaci (singer-songwriter); Stella Ancona (dancer); William Di Lello (singer); Valeria Valente (singer)

=== Season 10 (2010–2011) ===
- Teachers: Grazia Di Michele, Luca Jurman, Rudy Zerbi, Maria Grazia Fontana, Dado Parisini, Garrison Rochelle, Alessandra Celentano, Marco Garofalo, Luciano Cannito, Carl Portal, Michele Villanova

==== Final stage ====
Position	Contestant	Type
1	Virginio Simonelli	Singer-songwriter
1	Denny Lodi	Dancer
2	Annalisa	Singer-songwriter
2	Giulia Pauselli	Dancer
3	Vito Conversano	Dancer
4	Francesca Nicolì	Singer
5	Debora Di Giovanni	Dancer
6	Antonella Lafortezza	Singer
7	Diana Del Bufalo	Singer
8	Riccardo Riccio	Dancer
9	Antonio Mungari	Singer-songwriter
10	Costantino Imperatore	Dancer

==== Initial stage ====
Alessandro Paparusso (singer); Andrea Condorelli (dancer); Andrea Vigentini (singer-songwriter); Arnaldo Santoro (singer-songwriter); Gabriella Culletta (singer); Gessica Notaro (singer); Giorgia Urrico (singer); Michelle Vitrano (dancer); Paolo Cervellera (dancer); Stefan Di Maria Poole (singer)

=== Season 11 (2011–2012) ===
- Teachers: Grazia Di Michele, Rudy Zerbi, Mara Maionchi, Garrison Rochelle, Alessandra Celentano, Luciano Cannito

==== Final stage ====
Position	Contestant	Type
1	Giuseppe Giofrè	Dancer
1	Gerardo Pulli	Singer
2	Francesca Dugarte	Dancer
2	Ottavio De Stefano	Singer
3	Carlo Alberto Di Micco	Singer
3	Nunzio Perricone	Dancer
4	Claudia Casciaro	Singer
4	Jonathan Gerlo	Dancer
5	Valeria Romitelli	Singer
5	Valentin Stoica	Dancer
6	Marco Castelluzzo	Singer
6	Josè Becerra	Dancer
7	Stefano Marletta	Singer
8	Francesca Mariani	Singer

==== Initial stage ====
Alessandra Procacci (singer); Alessia Di Francesco (singer); Caterina Licini (dancer); Chiara Giuli (dancer); Daniele Sibilli (dancer); Ilario Frigione (dancer); Legra Yunieska Sanchez (dancer); Lidia Pastorello (singer); Lorenzo Tognocchi (singer); Nicola Di Trapani (singer); Pamela Gueli (singer); Ruben Filipe Mendes Dos Santos Felizardo (singer); Sergio Nigro (dancer); Veronica Paradiso (dancer)

=== Season 12 (2012–2013) ===
- Teachers: Grazia Di Michele, Rudy Zerbi, Mara Maionchi, Garrison Rochelle, Alessandra Celentano, Luciano Cannito

==== Final stage ====
Position	Contestant	Type
1	Moreno	Rapper
2	Greta Manuzi	Singer
3	Niccolò Noto	Dancer
4	Verdiana Zangaro	Singer
5	Pasquale Di Nuzzo	Dancer
6	Ylenia Morganti	Singer
7	Lorella Boccia	Dancer
8	Edwyn Roberts	Singer-songwriter
9	Antonio Parisi	Dancer
10	Marta Marino	Dancer
11	Emanuele Corvaglia	Singer-songwriter
12	Angela Semerano	Singer
13	Costanzo Del Pinto	Singer
14	Anthony Donadio	Dancer
15	Andrea Di Giovanni	Singer
16	Chiara Provvidenza	Singer

==== Initial stage ====
Andrea Attila Felice (dancer); Antonio Minini (dancer); Cristina Sangiorgio (singer); Davide Carella (singer); Etienne Pezzuto (dancer); Federica Filannino (singer-songwriter); Giacomo Garavini (dancer); Giosuè Amato (singer); Irene Rausa (singer); Leonardo Bizzarri (dancer); Lorenzo "Amnesia" Venera (rapper); Marika Calabrese (singer); Martina Monaco (dancer); Nicola Rosafio (singer); Nicole Marin (dancer); Ruben Mendes (singer)

=== Season 13 (2013–2014) ===
- Teachers: Grazia Di Michele, Rudy Zerbi, Carlo Di Francesco, Klaus Bonoldi, Garrison Rochelle, Alessandra Celentano, Kledi Kadiu, Veronica Peparini

==== Final stage ====
Position	Contestant	Type
1	Deborah Iurato	Singer-songwriter
2	Dear Jack	Band
3	Vincenzo Durevole	Dancer
4	Christian Pace	Dancer
5	Giada Agasucci	Singer
6	Nick Casciaro	Singer-songwriter
7	Paolo Macagnino	Singer
8	Lorenzo Del Moro	Dancer
9	Oscar Carmenates	Dancer
10	Carboidrati	Band
11	Federica Rigoli	Dancer
12	Knef	Dance crew
13	Danny Lahome	Rapper
14	Sara Mattei	Singer
15	Miriam Masala	Singer
16	Giacomo Castellana	Dancer

==== Initial stage ====
Alessio Trimboli (singer); Angelo D'Aiello (dancer); Cesare Cernigliaro (rapper); Cristian Lo Presti (dancer); Emiliano Serra (dancer); Exxtra (rapper); Francesca Del Toro (dancer); Francesco Bertini (dancer); Giacomo Paci (singer-songwriter); Gloria Atzeni (singer); Greta Giampietro (dancer); Human Evolution (dance crew); Jacopo Paone (dancer); Letizia Rizzoni (dancer); Michael Dakhil (singer); Naomi Mele (dancer); Paolo Busti (dancer); Simons (band); Valerio Moro (dancer); Vincenzo Ficicchia (singer)

=== Season 14 (2014–2015) ===
- Teachers: Grazia Di Michele, Rudy Zerbi, Carlo Di Francesco, Francesco Sarcina, Garrison Rochelle, Alessandra Celentano, Kledi Kadiu, Veronica Peparini

==== Final stage ====
Position	Contestant	Type
1	The Kolors	Band
2	Briga	Rapper
3	Virginia Tomarchio	Dancer
4	Klaudia Pepa	Dancer
5	Giorgio Albanese	Dancer
6	Valentina Tesio	Singer
7	Luca Tudisca	Singer-songwriter
8	Cristian Lo Presti	Dancer
9	Shaila Gatta	Dancer
10	Paola Marotta	Singer
11	Michele Nocca	Dancer
12	Davide Mogavero	Singer-songwriter

==== Initial stage ====
Alice Paba (singer-songwriter); Attika (band); Danilo Aiello (dancer); Esteban Morales (singer); Federico Urgesi (singer-songwriter); Francesca Miola (singer); Francesco Bax (dancer); Francesco Porcelluzzi (dancer); Gabriele Tufi (singer); Graziano Di Prima (dancer); La Gente (band); Leslie Sackey (singer); Luana Fraccalvieri (singer); Silvia Boreale (singer); Simone Baroni (dancer); Vanessa Guidolin (dancer)

=== Season 15 (2015–2016) ===
- Teachers: Rudy Zerbi, Carlo Di Francesco, Fabrizio Moro, Alex Braga, Marco Maccarini, Garrison Rochelle, Alessandra Celentano, Kledi Kadiu, Veronica Peparini, Natalia Titova

==== Final stage ====
Position	Contestant	Type
1	Sergio Sylvestre	Singer
2	Elodie	Singer
3	Gabriele Esposito	Dancer
4	Lele Esposito	Singer-songwriter
5	Alessio Gaudino	Dancer
6	La Rua	Band
7	Chiara Grispo	Singer-songwriter
8	Alessio La Padula	Dancer
9	Michele Lanzeroti	Dancer
10	Cristiano Cosa	Singer-songwriter
11	Patrizio Ratto	Dancer
12	Emanuele Caruso	Dancer

==== Initial stage ====
Andreas Müller (dancer); Arianna Di Francesco (dancer); Aula 39 (band); Benedetta Orlandini and Luca Favilla (dance duo); Carmela Senatore (singer); Daniela Ribezzo (dancer); Floriana Poma (singer); Francesco Crimi (dancer); Gessica Taghetti (dancer); Joshua Jack (singer); Luca D'Arbenzio (singer); Metrò (band); Nevenera (band); Nick Zaramella (singer); Paolo Barbonaglia (dancer); Raft (band); Yvonne Tocci (singer)

=== Season 16 (2016–2017) ===
- Teachers: Rudy Zerbi, Carlo Di Francesco, Fabrizio Moro, Alex Braga, Boosta, Garrison Rochelle, Alessandra Celentano, Kledi Kadiu, Veronica Peparini, Natalia Titova, Emanuel Lo

==== Final stage ====
Position	Contestant	Type
1	Andreas Müller	Dancer
2	Riccardo Marcuzzo	Singer-songwriter
3	Federica Carta	Singer-songwriter
4	Sebastian Melo	Dancer
5	Mike Bird †	Singer-songwriter
6	Thomas Bocchimpani	Singer
7	Shady	Singer-songwriter
8	Cosimo Barra	Dancer
9	Oliviero Bifulco	Dancer
10	Vittoria Markov	Dancer
11	Lo Strego	Singer-songwriter
12	Michele Perniola	Singer

==== Initial stage ====
Alessio Minnini (singer-songwriter); Elisa Vismara (singer); Erik Locatelli (dancer); Francesco Parrino (singer-songwriter); Giada Pilloni (singer); Giulia Pelegatti (dancer); Lorenzo Sorice (dancer); Marc Lee (singer); Marta Mason (singer); Raffaella Prisco (dancer); Rosario Canale (singer-songwriter); Serena De Bari (singer); Simone Frazzetta (dancer); Valentina Giardullo (singer-songwriter)

=== Season 17 (2017–2018) ===
- Teachers: Rudy Zerbi, Carlo Di Francesco, Giusy Ferreri, Paola Turci, Garrison Rochelle, Alessandra Celentano, Veronica Peparini, Bill Goodson

==== Final stage ====
Position	Contestant	Type
1	Irama	Singer-songwriter
2	Carmen Ferreri	Singer
3	Einar Ortiz	Singer
4	Lauren Celentano	Dancer
5	Emma Muscat	Singer-songwriter
6	Biondo	Rapper
7	Bryan Ramirez	Dancer
8	Luca Campomaggi	Dancer
9	Zic	Singer-songwriter
10	Matteo Cazzato	Singer
11	Valentina Verdecchi	Dancer
12	Sephora Ferrillo	Dancer
13	Daniele Rommelli	Dancer
14	Filippo Di Crosta	Dancer

==== Initial stage ====
Audjah Syarifam Rachmi (singer); Claudia Manto (dancer); Elliot Horne (singer); Emanuele Avino (singer-songwriter); Federico Baroni (singer-songwriter); Grace Cambria (singer); Luca Vismara (singer); Nicolas De Souza (dancer); Nicole Vergani (singer); Orion Pico (dancer); Paola De Filippis (dancer); Silvia Belluco (singer); Simone "Mose" Reo (rapper); The Jab (band); Vittorio Ardovino (dancer)

=== Season 18 (2018–2019) ===
- Teachers: Rudy Zerbi, Stash, Alex Britti, Alessandra Celentano, Veronica Peparini, Timor Steffens

==== Final stage ====
Position	Contestant	Type
1	Alberto Urso	Singer
2	Giordana Angi	Singer-songwriter
3	Rafael Castro	Dancer
4	Vincenzo Di Primo	Dancer
5	Tish Boric	Singer
6	Umberto Gaudino	Dancer
7	Mameli	Singer-songwriter
8	Valentina Vernia	Dancer
9	Alvis	Rapper
10	Jefeo	Rapper
11	Ludovica Caniglia	Singer
12	Mowgly	Dancer

==== Initial stage ====
Alessandro Casillo (singer); Anna Maria "Mimmi" Cicarelli (dancer); Arianna Forte (dancer); Bad Matty (dancer); Daniel Piccirillo (singer); Daniele Nocchi (dancer); Ellynora (singer); Federica Marinari (singer); Federico Milan (dancer); Giacomo Eva (singer-songwriter); Gianmarco Galati (dancer); Giusy Romaldi (dancer); Kevin Payne (singer); Matteo "Yamatt" Galvani (rapper); Marco Alimenti (dancer); Miguel Chavez (dancer); Noemi Cainero (singer); Samuel Santarelli (dancer)

=== Season 19 (2019–2020) ===
- Teachers: Rudy Zerbi, Stash, Anna Pettinelli, Alessandra Celentano, Veronica Peparini, Timor Steffens

==== Final stage ====
Position	Contestant	Type
1	Gaia	Singer-songwriter
2	Javier Rojas	Dancer
3	Giulia Molino	Singer-songwriter
4	Nicolai Gorodiskii	Dancer
5	Nyv	Singer-songwriter
6	Jacopo Ottonello	Singer
7	Valentin Dumitru	Dancer
8	Talisa Ravagnani	Dancer
9	Francesco Bertoli	Singer-songwriter
10	Martina Beltrami	Singer-songwriter

==== Initial stage ====
Alioscia Grossi (dancer); Ayoub Haraka (dancer); Devil Angelo (rapper); Federico Pietrucci (dancer); Francesca Sarasso (singer); Giorgia Lopez (dancer); Giorgio "Skioffi" Iacobelli (rapper); Giuseppe Preziosa (dancer); Inico (band); Karina Samoylenko (dancer); Matteo Cogliandro (dancer); Michelangelo Vizzini (singer-songwriter); Sofia Di Benedetto (dancer); Stefano Farinetti (singer)

=== Season 20 (2020–2021) ===
- Teachers: Rudy Zerbi, Anna Pettinelli, Arisa, Alessandra Celentano, Veronica Peparini, Lorella Cuccarini

==== Final stage ====
Position	Contestant	Type
1	Giulia Stabile	Dancer
2	Sangiovanni	Singer-songwriter
3	Alessandro Cavallo	Dancer
4	Aka 7even	Singer-songwriter
5	Deddy	Singer-songwriter
6	Serena Marchese	Dancer
7	Tancredi Cantù	Singer-songwriter
8	Samuele Barbetta	Dancer
9	Raffaele Renda	Singer-songwriter
10	Martina Miliddi	Dancer
11	Enula Bareggi	Singer-songwriter
12	Rosa Di Grazia	Dancer
13	Tommaso Stanzani	Dancer
14	Leonardo Lamacchia	Singer-songwriter
15	Ibla	Singer-songwriter
16	Esa Abrate	Singer-songwriter
17	Gaia Di Fusco	Singer

==== Initial stage ====
Arianna Gianfelici (singer); Elisabetta Ivankovich (singer); Evandro Ciaccia (singer-songwriter); Federica "Kika" La Rocca (singer); Giulio Musca (singer); Letizia Bertoldi (singer); Riccardo Guarnaccia (dancer)

=== Season 21 (2021–2022) ===
- Teachers: Rudy Zerbi, Anna Pettinelli, Lorella Cuccarini, Alessandra Celentano, Veronica Peparini, Raimondo Todaro

==== Final stage ====
Position	Contestant	Type
1	Luigi Strangis	Singer-songwriter
2	Michele Esposito	Dancer
3	Serena Carella	Dancer
4	Alex Wyse	Singer-songwriter
5	Sissi	Singer-songwriter
6	Albe	Singer-songwriter
7	Dario Schirone	Dancer
8	Nunzio Stancapiano	Dancer
9	LDA	Singer-songwriter
10	Carola Puddu	Dancer
11	Crytical	Rapper
12	Aisha Maryam Samb	Singer-songwriter
13	Leonardo Lini	Dancer
14	Jon Erik De La Cruz	Dancer
15	Christian Stefanelli	Dancer
16	Calma	Singer-songwriter
17	Gio Montana	Singer-songwriter
18	Alice Del Frate	Dancer

==== Initial stage ====
Alessandra "Ale" Cicariello (singer-songwriter); Andrea "Kandy" Curiale (singer); Andrea Siragusa (singer); Cosmary Fasanelli (dancer); Cristiano La Bozzetta (dancer); Elena Manuele (singer); Elisabetta Ivankovich (singer); Flavia "Flaza" Zardetto (singer-songwriter); Giacomo Vianello (singer); Guido Sarnataro (dancer); Inder Singh (trapper); Maria "Rea" Mircea (singer-songwriter); Mattias Nigiotti (dancer); Mattia Zenzola (dancer); Mirko Masia (dancer); Nicol Castagna (singer-songwriter); Simone Russo (singer-songwriter); Tommaso Cesana (singer); Virginia Vorraro (dancer)

=== Season 22 (2022–2023) ===
- Teachers: Rudy Zerbi, Lorella Cuccarini, Arisa, Alessandra Celentano, Raimondo Todaro, Emanuel Lo

==== Final stage ====
Position	Contestant	Type
1	Mattia Zenzola	Dancer
2	Angelina Mango	Singer-songwriter
3	Wax	Singer-songwriter
4	Isobel Fetiye Kinnear	Dancer
5	Aaron	Singer-songwriter
6	Maddalena Svevi	Dancer
7	Giovanni Cricca	Singer-songwriter
8	Ramon Agnelli	Dancer
9	Federica Andreani	Singer
10	Alessio Cavaliere	Dancer
11	Samuele Segreto	Dancer
12	Gianmarco Petrelli	Dancer
13	Piccolo G	Singer-songwriter
14	NDG	Singer-songwriter
15	Megan Ria	Dancer

==== Initial stage ====
Andre Mandelli (singer); Andrea Ascanio (singer-songwriter); Asia Bigolin (dancer); Benedetta Vari (dancer); Claudia Bentrovato (dancer); Eleonora Cabras (dancer); Lorenzo "Jore" Longoni (singer-songwriter); Ludovica Grimaldi (dancer); Diego "Mezkal" Taralletto De Falco (singer-songwriter); Marco "Niveo" Fasano (singer-songwriter); Pasquale "Paky" Brunetti (dancer); Rita Pompili (dancer); Samuel Antinelli (dancer); Tommy Dali (singer-songwriter); Valeria "Guera" Mancini (singer-songwriter); Vanessa Bellini (dancer)

=== Season 23 (2023–2024) ===
- Teachers: Rudy Zerbi, Lorella Cuccarini, Anna Pettinelli, Alessandra Celentano, Raimondo Todaro, Emanuel Lo

==== Final stage ====
Position	Contestant	Type
1	Sarah Toscano	Singer-songwriter
2	Marisol Castellanos	Dancer
3	Petit	Singer-songwriter
4	Dustin Taylor	Dancer
5	Holden	Singer-songwriter
6	Mida	Singer-songwriter
7	Martina Giovannini	Singer
8	Sofia Cagnetti	Dancer
9	Gaia De Martino	Dancer
10	Lil Jolie	Singer-songwriter
11	Lucia Ferrari	Dancer
12	Giovanni Tesse	Dancer
13	Nicholas Borgogni	Dancer
14	Kumo	Dancer
15	Ayle	Singer-songwriter

==== Initial stage ====
Chiara "Kia" Faedda (singer); Chiara Porchianello (dancer); Elia Fiore (dancer); Ezio Liberatore (singer-songwriter); Francesco "Holy Francisco" Guarnera (singer-songwriter); Leonardo "Spacehippiez" Rossi (singer-songwriter); Matthew Rota (singer-songwriter); Mattia "Malìa" Gattoni (singer-songwriter); Nahaze (singer-songwriter); Samuele Spina (singer-songwriter); Simone Galluzzo (dancer); Stella Cardone (singer); Mew (singer-songwriter)

=== Season 24 (2024–2025) ===
- Teachers: Rudy Zerbi, Lorella Cuccarini, Anna Pettinelli, Alessandra Celentano, Emanuel Lo, Deborah Lettieri

==== Final stage ====
Position	Contestant	Type
1	Daniele Doria	Dancer
2	Trigno	Singer-songwriter
3	Alessia Pecchia	Dancer
4	Antonia Nocca	Singer
5	Francesco Fasano	Dancer
6	Nicolò Filippucci	Singer
7	Jacopo Sol	Singer-songwriter
8	Chiara Bacci	Dancer
9	Senza Cri	Singer-songwriter
10	Francesca Bosco	Dancer
11	Chiamamifaro	Singer-songwriter
12	Luk3	Singer-songwriter
13	Raffaella Mitaritonna	Dancer
14	Vybes	Rapper
15	Asia De Figlio	Dancer
16	Dandy Cipriano	Dancer

==== Initial stage ====
Alena Casarino (rapper); Alessio Di Ponzio (dancer); Antonio Affortunato (dancer); Diego Lazzari (singer-songwriter); Gabriele Baio (dancer); Gabriele "Deddè" Mazza (singer-songwriter); Giorgia Conti (dancer); Ilan Muccino (singer-songwriter); Rebecca Ferreri (dancer); Samuele Mollenbeck (singer-songwriter); Sienna Osborne (dancer), Teodora Martinez (dancer).

=== Season 25 (2025–2026) ===
- Teachers: Rudy Zerbi, Lorella Cuccarini, Anna Pettinelli, Alessandra Celentano, Emanuel Lo, Veronica Peparini

==== Final stage ====
Position	Contestant	Type
1	Lorenzo Salvetti	Singer-songwriter
2	Alessio Di Ponzio	Dancer
3	Emiliano Fiasco	Dancer
4	Elena D'Elia	Singer-songwriter
5	Nicola Marchionni	Dancer
6	Angie	Singer-songwriter
7	Gard	Singer-songwriter
8	Riccardo Stimolo	Singer
9	Alex Calu	Dancer
10	Kiara Fina	Dancer
11	Caterina Lumina	Singer-songwriter
12	Plasma	Singer-songwriter
13	Valentina Pesaresi	Singer
14	Simone Galante	Dancer
15	Antonio Stillante	Dancer
16	Michele Ballo	Singer
17	Opi	Singer-songwriter

==== Initial stage ====
Anna Iseppi (dancer); Flavia Buoncristiani (singer-songwriter); Francesco "Frasa" Sias (singer-songwriter); Giorgia Foglini (dancer); Giulia Nicolai (dancer); Maria Rosaria Dalmonte (dancer); Matilde Fazio (dancer); Michelle Cavallaro (singer-songwriter); Paola Re (dancer); Penelope Massa (singer-songwriter); Pierpaolo Monzillo (dancer); Tommaso Troso (dancer)

=== Season 26 (2026-2027) ===
Teachers: Rudy Zerbi, Amadeus ,Samurai Jay, Alessandra Celentano, Lorella Cuccarini, Ambra Angiolini

==== Running for final stage ====
Contestant	Type
Alex Chimetto	Athlet
Andrea Heros	Singer-songwriter
Anna Abbagnale	Dancer
Anna Messina	Dancer
Aura	Singer-songwriter
Charli	Dancer
Clara Maria Rocco	Dancer
Gabriele Guidi Rontani	Athlet
India Serafini	Athlet
Benedetta Giuliano	Dancer
Jed	Singer-songwriter
Kashmere	Singer-songwriter
Lollo	Dancer
Napo	Dancer
Nicolò Bassani	Singer-songwriter
Riccardo Frison	Dancer
Saitta	Singer-songwriter
Shari (singer)	Singer-songwriter
Tiaso	Singer-songwriter

==== Initial stage ====
Paulo Sergio Valvano (singer-songwriter); Erness (singer-songwriter); Posniak (singer-songwriter); Celeste Moroni (dancer); Manuel Meledina (singer-songwriter); Manolo Borelli(dancer).

== Final stage ratings ==
TV Channel	Episodes	Season	Year	Average ratings		Premiere		Finale	
TV Channel	Episodes	Season	Year	viewers	share	viewers	share	viewers	share
Italia 1	10	1	2001–2002	4,851,000	19.26%	4,623,000	18.34%	5,774,000	24,93%
Italia 1	10	2	2002–2003	4,589,000	17.95%	4,619,000	19.75%	5,465,000	24,95%
Canale 5	11	3	2003–2004	5,501,000	25.32%	5,082,000	21.67%	6,934,000	35.88%
Canale 5	11	4	2004–2005	5,702,000	26.41%	5,499,000	24.67%	7,092,000	35.31%
Canale 5	9	5	2005–2006	5,304,000	25.59%	5,191,000	22.68%	6,323,000	35.19%
Canale 5	9	6	2006–2007	5,201,000	30.66%	4,588,000	25.10%	6,684,000	39.76%
Canale 5	11	7	2007–2008	6,151,000	28.62%	5,459,000	26.56%	7,187,000	35.38%
Canale 5	11	8	2008–2009	5,499,000	24.73%	5,627,000	26.32%	6,668,000	32.16%
Canale 5	11	9	2009–2010	4,763,000	23,11%	4,507,000	23,40%	5,940,000	29,90%
Canale 5	9	10	2010–2011	4,242,000	20.06%	4,044,000	19,32%	5,206,000	25.67%
Canale 5	9	11	2011–2012	4,719,000	22.57%	4,821,000	23.09%	4,956,000	22.96%
Canale 5	9	12	2012–2013	5,209,000	24.19%	5,280,000	23.31%	5,726,000	28.75%
Canale 5	10	13	2013–2014	4,662,000	21.87%	4,600,000	21.17%	5,294,000	24.62%
Canale 5	9	14	2014–2015	5,111,000	24.88%	5,514,000	25.78%	6,536,000	34.20%
Canale 5	9	15	2015–2016	4,665,000	23.31%	4,610,000	22.25%	5,835,000	29.19%
Canale 5	10	16	2016–2017	4,136,000	21.68%	4,024,000	20.72%	4,822,000	28.54%
Canale 5	10	17	2017–2018	4,009,000	21.50%	3,996,000	20.77%	4,872,000	25.10%
Canale 5	9	18	2018–2019	4,053,000	22.56%	4,096,000	22.23%	4,804,000	27.00%
Canale 5	6	19	2019–2020	4,227,000	20.16%	3,778,000	19.82%	4,822,000	22.78%
Canale 5	9	20	2020–2021	5,848,000	28.19%	6,016,000	28.73%	6,667,000	33.49%
Canale 5	9	21	2021–2022	4,346,000	26.47%	4,507,000	25.83%	4,327,000	28.65%

== Spin-off ==
=== Amici speciali ===
Amici speciali was a spin-off of the talent show Amici, hosted by Maria De Filippi, aired in primetime on Canale 5 from 15 May 2020 to 5 June 2020, with the intention of financing the Italian Civil Protection during the COVID-19 pandemic. The talent show included some former competitors from past editions of Amici and from other talent shows, divided into two teams, white and blue. The two teams were judged by professionals from the world of entertainment and television, including Sabrina Ferilli, Gerry Scotti, Eleonora Abbagnato and Giorgio Panariello.

The contestant were the singers Alberto Urso, Gaia, Giordana Angi, The Kolors, Irama, Michele Bravi, Random, and the dancers Andreas Müller, Alessio Gaudino, Gabriele Esposito, Javier Rojas, Umberto Gaudino.

== Sanremo participation and singers sales ==
The singers launched by the television program have sold over 32.395.000 copies certified by FIMI combined, becoming the talent show with the highest number of sales in Italy.

Artist	Amici's season	Record label (today)	Albums (+ EP + Demo)	Sales certified _{(as of Nov 10, 2026)}	Festival di Sanremo's Participations
Annalisa	2011	Warner	9	5,450,000+	6 Art.
Irama	2018	Warner	5 (+ 1 EP)	4,625,000+	6 Art.
Elodie	2016	Universal	5	4,480,000+	4 Art.
Alessandra Amoroso	2009	Sony/Columbia	8 (+ 1 EP)	3,530,000+	1 Art.
Emma	2010	Universal	7 (+ 1 EP)	3,170,000+	4 Art. (Winner 2012)
Sangiovanni	2021	Sugar/Fascino	1	2,710,000+	2 Art.
Angelina Mango	2023	21 CO/LA TARMA/BMG	2 (+ 2 EP)	1,950,000+	1 Art. (Winner 2024)
Mara Sattei	2015	Arista/Sony	2 (+ 1 EP)	1,760,000+	2 Art.
The Kolors	2015	Warner (from 2023); Universal (2015 - 2022)	3	1,595,000+	3 Art.
Gaia	2020	Sony	3 (+ 1 EP)	1,150,000+	2 Art.
Sanremo category: Art.: category "Artisti/Big"; NP: category "Nuove proposte"
