= Anbeta Toromani =

Albanian-Italian ballet dancer and dance teacher (born 1979)

- Born: 2 April 1979 (age 46); Tirana, PR Albania
- Occupations: Dancer; dance teacher

Anbeta Toromani (born 2 April 1979) is an Albanian-born naturalised Italian dancer and dance teacher. She became known in Italy as the runner-up on the second edition of the talent show Amici di Maria De Filippi. She has performed as prima ballerina at institutions such as the National Opera and Ballet Theatre of Tirana, Teatro di San Carlo in Naples, Teatro Massimo in Palermo, and the Sferisterio Opera Festival in Macerata.

== Life and career ==
Born in Tirana, Toromani began artistic gymnastics at age five but transitioned to ballet at nine after an injury. She graduated from the National Dance Academy in Tirana and later specialised for a year at Leila Vilallova’s school in Baku. Returning to Albania, she became principal dancer at the National Opera and Ballet Theatre.

In 2002, she participated in the second edition of Amici di Maria De Filippi and finished in second place. From 2003 to 2012, she was a professional dancer on the show. Carla Fracci offered her an audition at La Scala, which she declined due to her television commitments.

In July 2007, she performed the role of Ecate in Macbeth at the Sferisterio in Macerata, directed by Pier Luigi Pizzi. In 2008, she appeared in Carmen, directed by Dante Ferretti. She won the 2009 edition of Amici – La sfida dei talenti and toured with the show Anbeta & José, choreographed by Alessandra Celentano.

From 2012 to 2017, she performed as principal dancer at Teatro di San Carlo, appearing in productions such as The Nutcracker, Otello, and Romeo and Juliet. In 2013, she danced in *Romeo and Juliet* at the Slovak National Theatre in Bratislava.

From 2015 to 2016, she toured with Coppélia in Italy alongside Alessandro Macario, directed by Amedeo Amodio. Between 2016 and 2019, she performed in touring productions of The Nutcracker. In 2021, she appeared in Carla Fracci Mon Amour, and in 2022 in Preludes in Messina. She returned to Amici (2022–2023) and appeared in Preludes for Juliet in Verona in 2023.

== Personal life ==
Since 2009, Toromani has been in a relationship with Italian dancer Alessandro Macario.

== Filmography ==
- Nero (2024), directed by Giovanni Esposito

== Television programs ==
- Amici di Maria De Filippi (Canale 5; 2002–2003 contestant, 2004–2012 professional, 2022–2023 guest judge)
- Virtuozet (TV Klan, Albania; 2018) – judge

== Awards and nominations ==
- 2004 – Premio Gino Tani
- 2005 – Premio Danza & Danza
