= Mew (singer) =

Italian singer-songwriter (born 1999)

- Born: Valentina Turchetto; 25 July 1999 (age 27); San Donà di Piave, Veneto, Italy
- Genres: Pop; dark pop
- Occupations: Singer; songwriter
- Instrument: Vocals
- Years active: 2023–present
- Labels: Capitol; EMI; Universal Music Italia

Valentina Turchetto (born 25 July 1999), known professionally as Mew, is an Italian singer-songwriter.

== Early life and education ==
Born in 1999 in San Donà di Piave (VE), she is the daughter of a German mother and a father originally from Jesolo (VE), where she grew up with her family.

After finishing high school, she started working in the family ice cream shop and then moved on to sales, as a clerk in a shop selling items related to one of her favorite anime: Pokémon. In this place where she found inspiration for her stage name, derived from the eponymous character in the franchise known as the Pokémon Novaspecies.

== Career ==
In 2019 she made her television debut by taking part in the X Factor auditions, where she performed the song "La birra calda", but was unable to qualify for the programme's live performance. In February 2023 she released his first single "Sangue", followed in May by the single "NS1Q", an acronym for "Non sono una qualunque". In September of the same year she auditioned for the twenty-third edition of the music talent show Amici di Maria De Filippi, broadcast on Canale 5, and then made it to the initial stage. During the program she presented the unreleased songs "Mercoledì mai" and "Vivo". In January 2024 she decided to withdraw from the talent show for personal reasons.

After leaving Amici, she signed a new recording contract with Capitol Records, a label of Universal Music Italia, with which she released the single "Posatenebre" on 8 March 2024. On 30 August followed by the single "Hyperlacrime". On 8 November Holden's single "Grandine", on which she collaborated, was released and debuted at number twenty-five on the Top Singles chart. In the same month she was selected to participate in Sanremo Giovani 2024, the youth competition for the Sanremo Music Festival 2025, with the song "Oh My God". After making it through the first round and the semifinal, reaching the final where she was eliminated.

On 18 April 2025 she released the single "Empatia". The single "Buia" was released on 19 September, preceding the release of his first EP, "Quando nessuno ci vede", on 10 October. The project consists of six tracks, which also includes the single "Posatenebre".

== Discography ==
=== Extended plays ===
List of EPs
Title	EP details
Quando nessuno ci vede	Released: 10 October 2025; Label: EMI, Universal Music Italia; Formats: CD, digital download, streaming

=== Singles ===
==== As lead artist ====
List of singles and album name
Title	Year	Album or EP
"Sangue"	2023	Non-album singles
"NS1Q"	2023	Non-album singles
"Mercoledì mai"	2023	Non-album singles
"Vivo"	2023	Non-album singles
"Posatenebre"	2024	Quando nessuno ci vede
"Hyperlacrime"	2024	Non-album singles
"Oh My God"	2024	Non-album singles
"Empatia"	2025	Non-album singles
"Buia"	2025	Quando nessuno ci vede

==== As featured artist ====
List of singles, with chart positions and album name
Title	Year	Peak chart positions
Title	Year	ITA
"Grandine" (Holden featuring Mew)	2024	25

=== Collaborations ===
List of singles as featured artist
Title	Year	Album or EP
"Bonnie & Clyde" (Side Baby featuring Mew)	2024	Leggendario
"Lacrimosa" (Estremo featuring Mew)	2024	Era
"Il buio" (Rondine featuring Mew)	2025	Rondine

== Television programs ==
Year	Title	Network	Notes
2023–2024	Amici di Maria De Filippi	Canale 5	Contestant (season 23)

== Participation in singing events ==
- Sanremo Giovani (Rai 1)
  - 2024 – Finalist with "Oh My God"
