= Lorenzo Salvetti =

Italian singer and songwriter (born 2007)

- Born: 12 August 2007 (age 19); Verona, Italy
- Genre: Pop
- Occupations: Singer; songwriter
- Instruments: Vocals; guitar; piano
- Years active: 2024–present
- Labels: Atlantic Italy; Warner Music Italia

Lorenzo Salvetti (born 12 August 2007) is an Italian singer and songwriter. He rose to prominence by participating in the eighteenth season of X Factor, where he finished in fourth place. He then won the twenty-fifth edition of Amici di Maria De Filippi in 2026.

== Early life and education ==
Raised in the Borgo Venezia neighborhood of Verona, with his brother Francesco, who plays drums, Salvetti was the second son of Emilia and Nicola Salvetti. During his childhood, he learned to play the guitar and piano, participated in ancient music choirs, and studied acting. Passionate about the history of music and nineteenth-century romanticism, he obtained his high school diploma at the Liceo Musicale Campostrini in Verona.

== Musical career ==
=== X Factor (2024–2025) ===
In 2024, Salvetti decided to audition for the casting of the eighteenth season of X Factor, where he joined Achille Lauro's team. During the competition, he presented his debut single Mille concerti and at the end of the season, he finished in fourth place. On 28 March 2025, he released his second single Lasciarsi è una cosa da grandi.

=== Amici di Maria De Filippi and Stupida vida (2025–present) ===
In November 2025, Salvetti entered the twenty-fifth edition of Amici di Maria De Filippi, where he passed the initial stage. In March 2026, he advanced to the evening phase of the competition by joining the team led by Lorella Cuccarini. Two months later, he reached the final and emerged as the winner, in addition to winning the Spotify Singles award.

During the show, Salvetti released three songs, Stupida vita, Prima di te e dopo, and Dimmelo tu, all of which were included in his debut EP Stupida vita, released on 22 May 2026, on Atlantic Italy and Warner Music Italia, which also includes three other songs. The EP debuted at number 52 on the FIMI albums chart.

== Discography ==
=== Extended plays ===
List of extended plays, with selected details
Title	Details	Peak chart positions
Title	Details	ITA
Stupida vita	Released: 22 May 2026; Label: Atlantic Italy, Warner Music Italia; Formats: CD, Digital download, streaming	52

=== Singles ===
==== As lead artist ====
Title	Year	Album or EP
"Mille concerti"	2024	Non-album singles
"Lasciarsi è una cosa da grandi"	2025	Non-album singles
"Stupida vita"	2026	Stupida vita
"Prima di te e dopo"	2026	Stupida vita
"Dimmelo tu"	2026	Stupida vita
