= Trigno (singer) =

Italian singer-songwriter (born 2002)

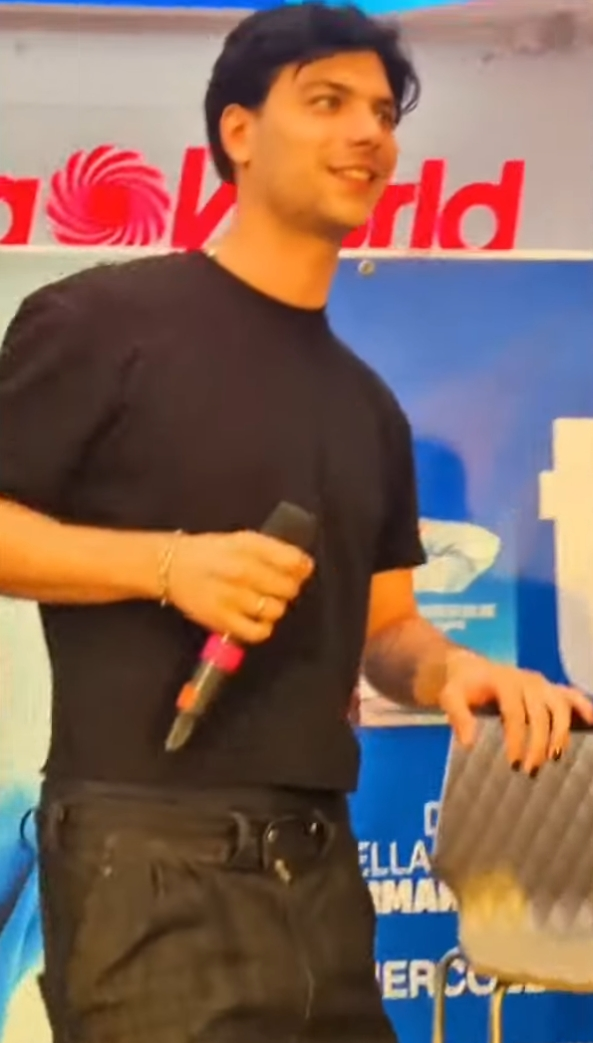
- Trigno performing in June 2025

Background information
- Born: Pietro Bagnadentro; 7 January 2002 (age 24); Asti, Piedmont, Italy
- Genres: Pop; urban
- Occupation: Singer-songwriter
- Instruments: Vocals; guitar; piano
- Years active: 2018–present
- Labels: Hokuto Empire; Sony Music; Warner Music Italy

Pietro Bagnadentro (born 7 January 2002), known professionally as Trigno, is an Italian singer-songwriter.

== Early life and education ==
Born and raised in Asti, the son of lawyer Paolo Bagnadentro, he began to develop an interest in music during his childhood, influenced by his mother, a pianist. During his adolescence, after abandoning a promising football career due to injury, he decided to move to Milan to pursue a career in music.

He began his education studying guitar and exploring various musical genres, such as jazz, R&B, and French and American rap, later graduating in economics and business management from the Università Cattolica del Sacro Cuore in Milan. He chose the stage name Trigno, which comes from the affectionate nickname "Pietrigno," given to him by his father during soccer games.

== Career ==
=== 2018–2024: debuts and Diciannove ===
In 2018, after participating in several urban music contests, he began collaborating with producer Carl Laurent, who brought him into a recording studio and had him record his first songs, including his first official single, "Prima o poi". This was followed in 2019 by the singles "Sogno", "Occhi" and "Calmo". In 2020, after signing a record deal with Francesco Facchinetti's Hokuto Empire label, he released the singles "Lento" and "Conto su di te".

On 19 February 2021, he released the single "Attorno", which preceded the release of his first EP Diciannove, containing seven tracks and released the following month. The single "Mille voci" was released on 17 June, 2022, followed by the single "Ma tu" on 2 August. The single "Non mi mancherai" was released on 5 May 2023, followed by the single "Casino" on 19 January 2024, both featuring Joe Viegas.

=== 2024–present: participation in Amici 24 and A un passo da me ===
In September 2024, he auditioned for the twenty-fourth edition of the Canale 5 music talent show Amici di Maria De Filippi, advancing to the initial stage. In March 2025, he gained access to the evening phase of the program, joining the team led by professors Anna Pettinelli and Deborah Lettieri. The following May, he reached the final, where he placed second, triumphing in the singing category and winning the radio prize.

During the program he released several unreleased songs, including "A un passo da me", "Maledetta Milano", "100 sigarette" and "D'amore non si muore", all four of which were subsequently included in his first EP, A un passo da me, released on 23 May 2025 by the Warner Music Italy label. The single "Ragazzina" was released on 17 October, followed on 23 January 2026 by the single "Parcheggio a ore".

== Discography ==
=== Extended play ===
List of EPs and with selected chart positions
Title	EP details	Peak chart positions
Title	EP details	ITA
Diciannove	Released: 19 March 2021; Label: Hokuto Empire, Sony Music; Format: CD, digital download, streaming	—
A un passo da me	Released: 23 May 2025; Label: Warner Music Italy; Format: CD, digital download, streaming	22
"—" denotes EP that did not chart or were not released.

=== Singles ===
List of singles and album name
Single	Year	Album or EP
"Prima o poi"	2018	Non-album singles
"Sogno"	2019	Non-album singles
"Occhi"	2019	Non-album singles
"Calmo"	2019	Non-album singles
"Lento"	2020	Non-album singles
"Conto su di te"	2020	Non-album singles
"Attorno"	2021	Diciannove
"Mille voci"	2022	Non-album singles
"Ma tu"	2022	Non-album singles
"Non mi mancherai" (with Joe Viegas)	2023	Non-album singles
"Casino" (with Joe Viegas)	2024	Non-album singles
"A un passo da me"	2024	A un passo da me
"Maledetta Milano"	2025	A un passo da me
"100 sigarette"	2025	A un passo da me
"D'amore non si muore"	2025	A un passo da me
"Ragazzina"	2025	Non-album singles
"Parcheggio a ore"	2026	Non-album singles

== Television programs ==
Year	Title	Network	Notes
2024–2025	Amici di Maria De Filippi	Canale 5	Contestant (season 24)

== Awards and nominations ==
Year	Award	Nomination	Work	Result	Notes
2025	Amici di Maria De Filippi	First place in the Singing category	Singing	Won	
2025	Amici di Maria De Filippi	Radio Award	Singing	Won	
