= Andrea Di Giovanni =

Italian musician

- Born: June 25, 1994 (age 32); Rome, Italy
- Education: BIMM Institute
- Occupation: Musician
- Website: andreadigiovanni.it

Andrea Di Giovanni is an Italian singer-songwriter and pop musician based in London.

== Early life and education ==
Di Giovanni was born in Rome on June 25, 1994. Growing up in Italy, the strict environment limited their ability to express their sexuality and identity. They began taking piano lessons at age 3 singing lessons at age 8. Di Giovanni left Christianity at age 17. At age 19, they moved to London and enrolled at the BIMM Institute, where they felt more able to express their queer identity.

== Career ==
Di Giovanni's debut EP, Permission, was released in May 2019, featuring the lead single "Forbidden Love", which honors Sylvia Rivera and other LGBTQ activists.

Di Giovanni released their debut album, Rebel, on March 26, 2021. The launch was preceded by the release of several singles, including "Stand Up and "Miracle".

== Personal life ==
Di Giovanni is gender-fluid, and uses he/him, she/her, and they/them.

== Discography ==
=== Studio albums ===
- Rebel (2021)

=== Extended plays ===
- Permission (2019)
