= Grazia Di Michele =

Italian singer-songwriter

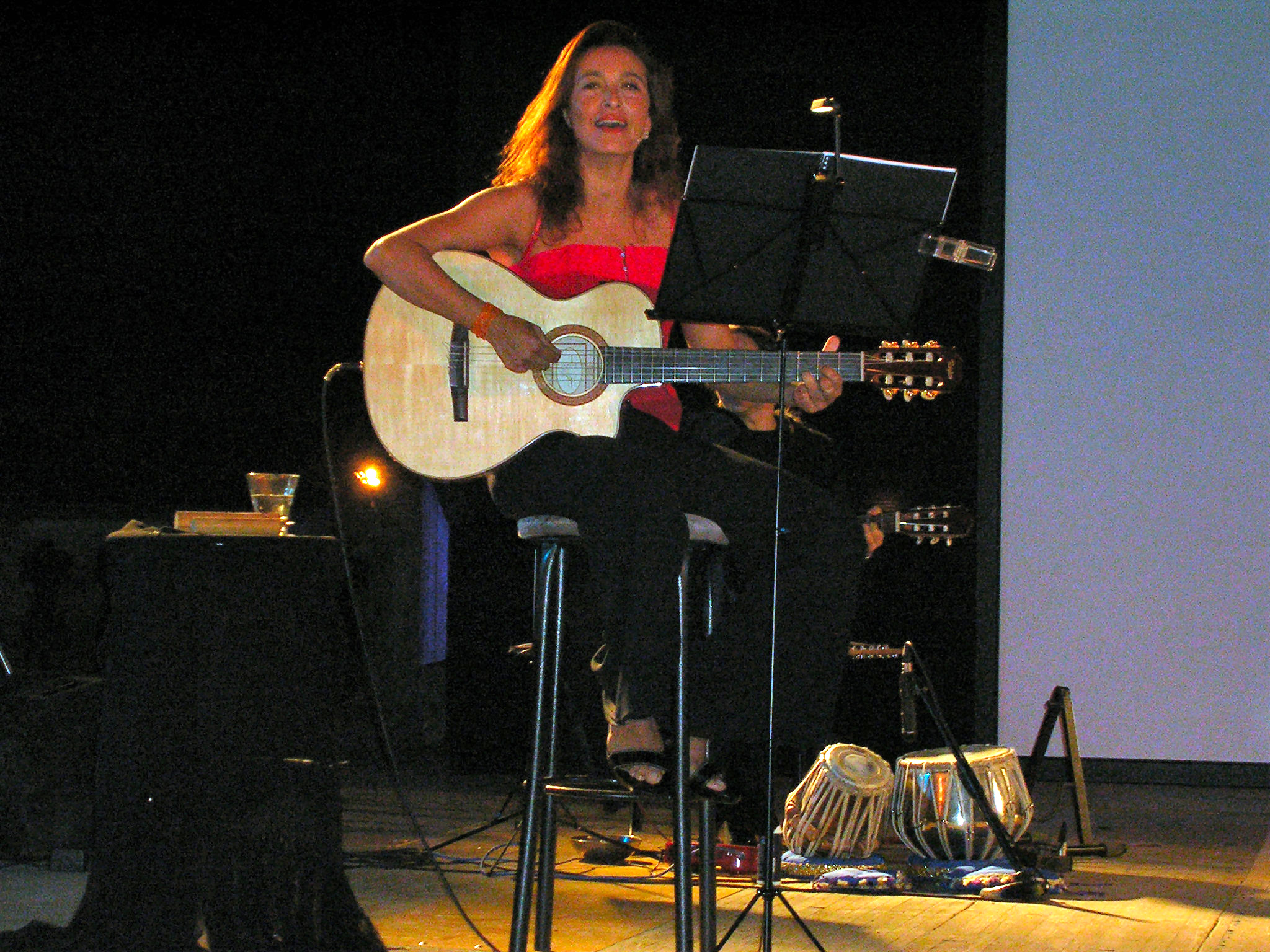
- Born: Maria Grazia Di Michele; 9 October 1955 (age 70); Rome, Italy
- Occupations: Singer; songwriter; vocal coach

Maria Grazia Di Michele (born 9 October 1955) is an Italian singer-songwriter.

== Life and career ==
Born in Rome to parents from Abruzzo, at very young age, Di Michele founded with Chiara Scotti and Clelia Lamorgese "L'Ape di Vetro" ("The Glass Bee"), a politically inspired musical group which disbanded after a few years.

She debuted as a solo singer at Folkstudio, a music venue in Rome, in 1977. In those years she also worked in a cultural club in Rome, the "Johann Sebastian Bar", and worked as a disc jockey in radio.

Her first album Cliché, characterized by provocative lyrics about feminist and social themes, was released in 1978. In 1983 she released the album Ragiona col cuore, of which the title track tells the story of a lesbian love, then in 1986 she got her first and major commercial success with the single "Le ragazze di Gauguin" and with the album with the same name. Between 1990 and 2015 she entered the Sanremo Music Festival four times, ranking third in 1993 with "Gli amori diversi", a duet with Rossana Casale.

== Discography ==
Album

- 1978 - Cliché (It, ZPLT 34029)
- 1983 - Ragiona col cuore (Venus Dischi, VNS 44701)
- 1986 - Le ragazze di Gauguin (WEA Italiana, 242139-1)
- 1988 - L'amore è un pericolo (WEA Italiana, 2446311-1)
- 1990 - Raccolta (WEA Italiana, 9031 71245; con due inediti)
- 1991 - Grazia Di Michele (WEA Italiana, 9031 73859-1)
- 1993 - Confini (Warner Music Italy, 4509-91262-1)
- 1995 - Rudji (Sony)
- 2001 - Naturale
- 2005 - Chiamalavita (Rai Trade)
- 2005 - Respiro
- 2006 - Le più belle canzoni di Grazia Di Michele (WEA)
- 2009 - Passaggi segreti (Rai Trade)
- 2012 - Giverny (RaiEri)
- 2015 - Il mio blu
- 2018 - Folli voli
- 2019 - Sante Bambole Puttane
- 2022 - Trialogo (Cantautrici) (con Rossana Casale e Mariella Nava)
- 2023 - Una storia d'amore - cantano Luigi Tenco e Dalida (con Giovanni Nuti)
- 2024 - Le Stagioni Del Cuore In 50 Canzoni (con Paolo Di Sabatino Trio)
