= Nicolò Filippucci =

Italian singer-songwriter (born 2006)

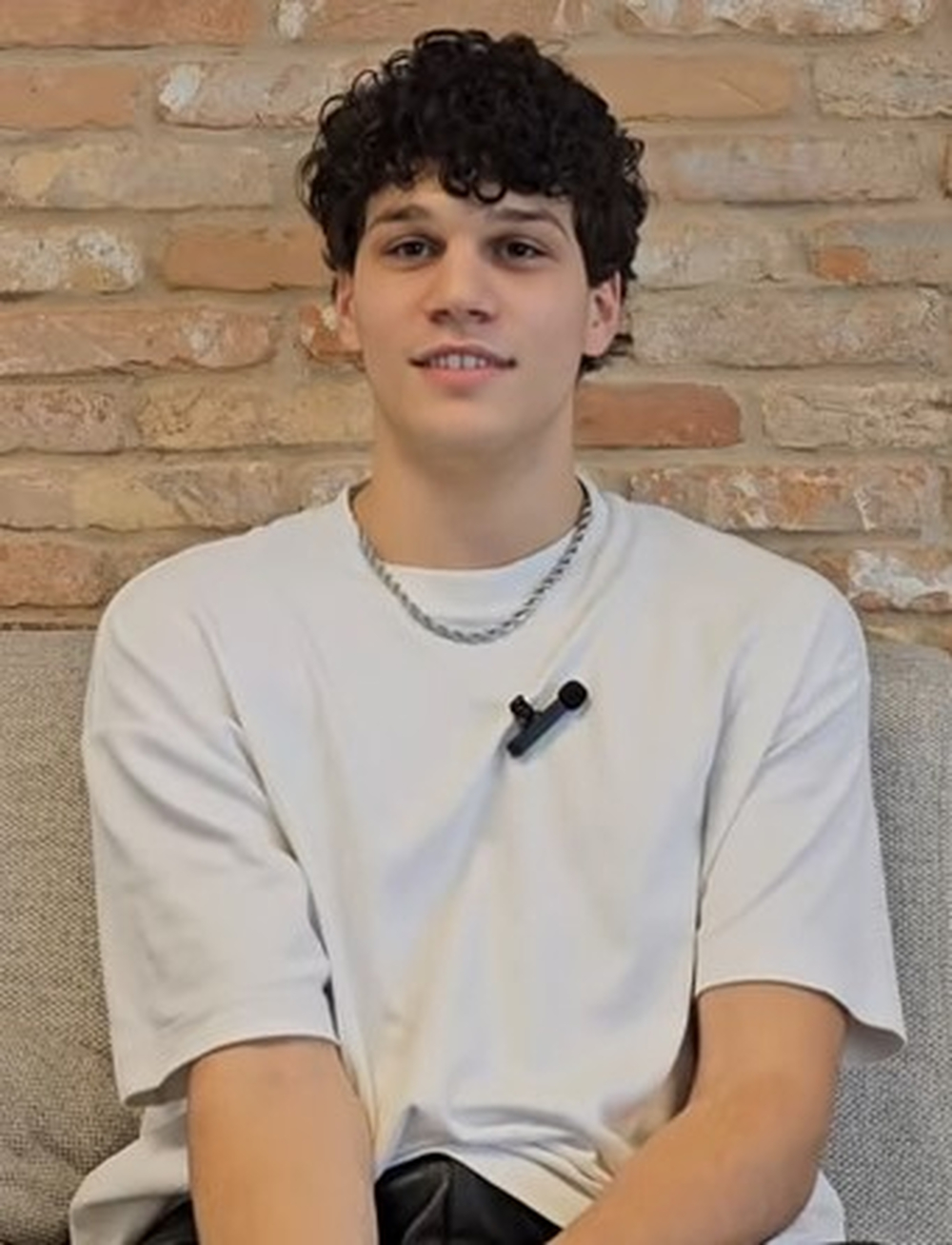
- Nicolò Filippucci in November 2025

Background information
- Born: 30 May 2006 (age 20); Castiglione del Lago, Umbria, Italy
- Genres: Pop
- Occupations: Singer; songwriter
- Instruments: Vocals; guitar; piano
- Years active: 2021–present
- Label: Warner Music Italy

Nicolò Filippucci (Italian pronunciation: [nikoˈlɔ ffilipˈputtʃi]; born 30 May 2006) is an Italian singer-songwriter.

== Early life and education ==
Born in Castiglione del Lago and raised in Corciano, both towns in the province of Perugia, Umbria, together with his older brother Jacopo, he is the second son of physiotherapist Francesca and business consultant Massimo Filippucci. At the age of seven he began playing the guitar and at nine he took part in his first show, "Giungla", singing in the children's choir of the Morlacchi Conservatory of Perugia.

He attended the "Galileo Galilei" scientific high school in Perugia, but interrupted his studies in his final year to participate in the television show Amici di Maria De Filippi. After completing his participation in the talent show, he resumed his studies privately and subsequently earned his high school diploma.

== Career ==
In 2021, he began performing and participating in several competitions. In June of the following year, he won the Il Mio Canto Libero singing competition in Santa Maria degli Angeli, while in September he won the 4th Cannara singing competition. In October, he gained access to the Cantagiro national final with his first unreleased song, "Fingere", winning the special MIO prize, awarded by a jury of industry journalists.

In August 2023 he participated in the contest dedicated to Marco Mengoni, "Guerriero", in which he won the Città di Ronciglione prize. In September, he participated in the national final of the NYCanta singing competition in Faenza, earning the opportunity to participate in the final round of the competition with his unreleased song, which took place at the Oceana Theatre in New York City, where he placed second. He subsequently qualified for the final round of the Tour Music Fest 2023 – The European Music Contest in San Marino, where he won both the "singer-songwriter" and "overall" categories, earning the Artist of the Year award. This was followed by victory at the Fatti Sentire Festival 2024, where he performed the unreleased "Senza parlare".

In September 2024, he joined the cast of the twenty-fourth edition of Canale 5's musical talent show Amici di Maria De Filippi, entering the initial phase. In March 2025, he entered the series phase of the show by joining the team led by coaches Anna Pettinelli and Deborah Lettieri, being eliminated during the semifinal on 10 May, but managed to win the Estathé Zero Award.

During the show, he released several new songs, including "Non mi dimenticherò", "Yin e Yang", "Cuore bucato" and "Un'ora di follia", all four of which were later included in his debut EP, Un'ora di follia, released on 24 May 2025 by Warner Music Italy, which also includes the songs "Occhi stanchi" and "Mi sono innamorato di te". The EP debuted at number seventeen on the FIMI Albums Chart. In the summer of that same year, he performed at several musical events, including TIM Summer Hits, Battiti Live, Yoga Radio Bruno Estate and RDS Summer Festival.

In October 2025, he was chosen to compete in Sanremo Giovani 2025, with the song "Laguna". After making it through the first round and the semifinal, he reached the final, where he managed to qualify for the Sanremo Music Festival 2026 in the Newcomers section. He went on to win the section.

== Discography ==
=== Studio album ===
List of albums with selected chart positions
Title	Album details	Peak chart positions
Title	Album details	ITA
Un posto dove andare	Released: 9 April 2026; Label: Warner Music Italy; Format: CD, digital download, streaming	21

=== Extended play ===
List of EPs with selected chart positions
Title	EP details	Peak chart positions
Title	EP details	ITA
Un'ora di follia	Released: 23 May 2025; Label: Warner Music Italy; Format: CD, digital download, streaming	17

=== Singles ===
List of singles, with chart positions and album name
Title	Year	Peak chart positions	Album or EP
Title	Year	ITA	Album or EP
"Fingere"	2022	—	Non-album single
"Senza parlare"	2024	—	Non-album single
"Non mi dimenticherò"	2024	—	Un'ora di follia
"Yin e Yang"	2025	—	Un'ora di follia
"Cuore bucato"	2025	—	Un'ora di follia
"Un'ora di follia"	2025	—	Un'ora di follia
"Laguna"	2025	37	Un posto dove andare
"Tutte le ragazze vogliono canzoni d'amore"	2026	—	Un posto dove andare
"Mantra"	2026	—	Un posto dove andare
"—" denotes singles that did not chart or were not released.

== Television programs ==
Year	Title	Network	Notes
2024–2025	Amici di Maria De Filippi	Canale 5	Contestant (season 24)

== Participation in singing events ==
- Sanremo Giovani (Rai 1)
  - 2025 – 1st place with "Laguna"
- Sanremo Music Festival (Rai 1)
  - 2026 – 1st place in the Newcomers' section with "Laguna"

== Awards and nominations ==
Year	Award	Nomination	Result	Notes
2022	Il mio canto libero		Won	
2022	Cantagiro	MIO Special Award	Won	
2023	Tour Music Fest – The European Music Contest	Singer-songwriter category	Won	
2023	Tour Music Fest – The European Music Contest	Artist of The Year	Won	
2023	Guerriero	City of Ronciglione	Won	
2025	Amici di Maria De Filippi	Estathé Zero Award	Won	
