= Juli (record producer) discography =

Discography of Italian record producer and disc jockey Juli

Juli discography
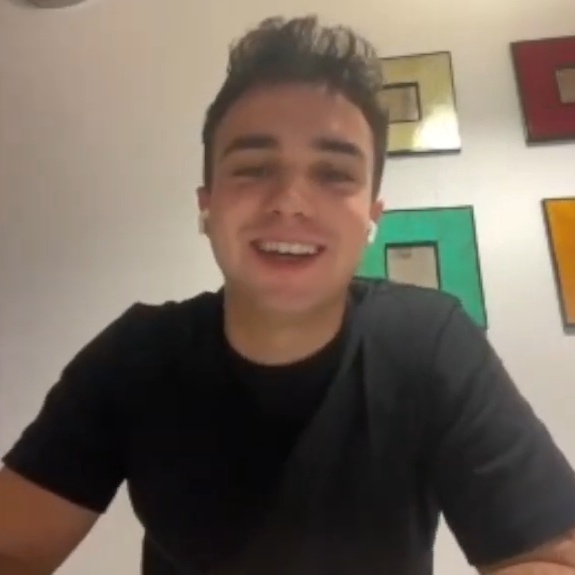
- Juli in 2024
- Studio albums: 4
- EPs: 3
- Singles: 54

The discography of Italian record producer and disc jockey Juli consists of four studio albums, three EP and fifty-four singles.

== Studio albums ==
List of albums with details
Title	Album details	Peak chart positions		Certifications
Title	Album details	ITA	SWI	Certifications
Liberté	Released: 9 May 2019; Label: Brioche Edizioni Musicali; Format: CD, digital download, streaming	—	—	
Gira, il mondo gira (with Olly)	Released: 10 February 2023; Released: Aleph, Epic; Format: CD, LP, digital download, streaming	13	—	FIMI: 2× Platinum
Tutta vita (with Olly)	Released: 25 October 2024; Released: Epic; Format: CD, LP, digital download, streaming	1	40	FIMI: Diamond
Solito cinema	Released: 24 April 2026; Released: Epic; Format: CD, LP, digital download, streaming	2	—	FIMI: Gold
"—" denotes album that did not chart or were not released.

== Extended plays ==
List of EPs with details
Title	EP details
Mai stato lucido (with Dunbo)	Released: 4 March 2020; Label: Brioche Edizioni Musicali; Format: CD, digital download, streaming
Una vita bellissima (with Oliver Green)	Pubblicato: 4 February 2021; Label: Guna; Format: CD, digital download, streaming
Il mondo gira (with Olly)	Released: 16 December 2022; Label: Aleph, Epic; Format: CD, digital download, streaming

== Singles ==
=== As lead artist ===
List of singles as lead artist, with selected chart positions, showing year released and album name
Title	Year	Peak chart positions		Certifications	Album or EP
Title	Year	ITA	SWI	Certifications	Album or EP
"Just Friends" (featuring Norah B)	2018	—	—		Non-album singles
"Ciò che volevo" (with KewPasmal and Latino)	2018	—	—		Non-album singles
"Non me la sento" (with Mezzo Miliardo and Keezy)	2018	—	—		Non-album singles
"U" (with Charlie Urick and Keezy)	2018	—	—		Non-album singles
"Legami" (with King Mikz)	2018	—	—		Non-album singles
"Esattamente te" (with Maidas featuring Itto and Norah B.)	2018	—	—		Non-album singles
"Maltempo"	2018	—	—		Non-album singles
"Un bacio alla Luna"	2019	—	—		Non-album singles
"Hula hoop"	2019	—	—		Non-album singles
"Invincible" (with Oliver Green)	2019	—	—		Non-album singles
"Stare bene" (with Keezy)	2019	—	—		Non-album singles
"Diamante" (with Latino and Keezy)	2019	—	—		Non-album singles
"Giornate storte" (with Oliver Green and Dunbo)	2019	—	—		Non-album singles
"Come stai bro?" (with Oliver Green and Boro)	2019	—	—		Non-album singles
"La mia band" (with Oliver Green)	2020	—	—		Non-album singles
"Oh nanana" (with Oliver Green and Ricky J)	2020	—	—		Non-album singles
"4life" (with Alyce)	2020	—	—		Non-album singles
"Giostra" (with Cicco Sanchez)	2020	—	—		Non-album singles
"Argent" (with Axell and Oliver Green)	2020	—	—		Non-album singles
"Tip tap" (with Oliver Green)	2020	—	—		Non-album singles
"Se ti calma" (with Olly)	2021	—	—		Non-album singles
"Non ho paura" (with Oliver Green and Olly)	2021	—	—		Non-album singles
"Lego" (with Olly)	2021	—	—		Non-album singles
"Tempo libero" (with Ricky J)	2021	—	—		Non-album singles
"Serate vuote" (with Latino and Oliver Green)	2021	—	—		Non-album singles
"Mi sento bene" (with Oliver Green)	2021	—	—		Non-album singles
"Hai fatto bene" (with Olly)	2021	—	—		Non-album singles
"Molecole" (with Axos)	2021	—	—		Non-album singles
"Scuba Diving" (with Olly and Joe Viegas)	2022	—	—		Non-album singles
"Up Boy" (with Oliver Green)	2022	—	—		Non-album singles
"Paura di me" (with Axos)	2022	—	—		Non-album singles
"Figlio della mole" (with Oliver Green)	2022	—	—		Non-album singles
"Un'altra volta" (with Olly)	2022	—	—	FIMI: Gold	Il mondo gira
"Siamo noi" (with Oliver Green, Olly and Axos)	2022	—	—		Non-album singles
"Simona" (with Skioffi)	2022	—	—		Non-album singles
"Fidati di me" (with Mida and Olly)	2022	—	—		Non-album singles
"Mono" (with Nox and Mont Black)	2022	—	—		Non-album singles
"Fammi morire" (with Olly)	2022	—	—		Il mondo gira
"Fuori di casa" (with Oliver Green)	2022	—	—		Non-album single
"L'anima balla" (with Olly)	2022	—	—	FIMI: Gold	Il mondo gira
"Sul petto" (with Oliver Green)	2022	—	—		Odt cosca
"La notte vola (RMX)" (with Olly and Lorella Cuccarini	2023	—	—	FIMI: Gold	Gira, il mondo gira
"Tutto con te" (with Olly)	2023	—	—		Gira, il mondo gira
"A squarciagola" (with Olly)	2023	77	—	FIMI: Gold	Tutta vita
"Devastante" (with Olly)	2024	6	—	FIMI: 3× Platinum	Tutta vita
"Ho voglia di te" (with Emma and Olly)	2024	20	—	FIMI: Platinum	Non-album single
"Per due come noi" (with Olly and Angelina Mango)	2024	1	—	FIMI: 3× Platinum	Tutta vita
"Quei ricordi là" (with Olly)	2024	15	—	FIMI: Platinum	Tutta vita
"Balorda nostalgia" (with Olly)	2025	1	6	FIMI: 4× Platinum; IFPI SWI: Gold	Tutta vita (sempre)
"Depresso fortunato" (with Olly)	2025	8	—	FIMI: Platinum	Tutta vita (sempre)
"Questa domenica" (with Olly)	2025	1	—	FIMI: 2× Platinum	Tutta vita (sempre)
"Brutta storia" (with Emma)	2025	60	—		Non-album single
"Quelli come me" (with Coez)	2026	41	—		Solito cinema
"—" denotes a single that did not chart or was not released.

=== As featured artist ===
List of singles
Year	Title
"Jovanotti" (Pizeta from Mars featuring Juli)	2018

== Other charted songs ==
List of other charted songs, with peak chart positions, showing year released and album name
Title	Year	Peak chart positions	Certifications	Album or EP
Title	Year	ITA	Certifications	Album or EP
"Menomale che c'è il mare" (with Olly)	2023	40	FIMI: Platinum	Gira, il mondo gira
"Bianca" (with Olly)	2023	80	FIMI: Gold	Gira, il mondo gira
"È festa" (with Olly)	2024	53		Tutta vita
"I cantieri del Giappone" (with Olly)	2024	57	FIMI: Gold	Tutta vita
"Noi che" (with Olly)	2024	60		Tutta vita
"A noi non serve far l'amore" (with Olly)	2024	66		Tutta vita
"Sopra la stessa barca" (with Olly featuring Enrico Nigiotti)	2024	62		Tutta vita
"Scarabocchi" (with Olly)	2024	6	FIMI: 2× Platinum	Tutta vita
"Così così" (with Olly)	2025	4	FIMI: Gold	Tutta vita (sempre)
"Il brivido della vita" (with Olly)	2025	7	FIMI: Gold	Tutta vita (sempre)
"Come noi non c'è nessuno" (with Olly)	2025	24		Tutta vita (sempre)
"Occhi color mare" (with Olly)	2025	11	FIMI: Gold	Tutta vita (sempre)
"Buon trasloco" (with Olly)	2025	6	FIMI: Gold	Tutta vita (sempre)

== Collaborations ==
List of song and album name
Title	Year	Peak chart positions	Album
Title	Year	ITA	Album
"L'amore è / L'amore va" (Enrico Nigiotti featuring Olly and Juli)	2026	25	Maledetti innamorati

== Productions ==
=== Studio albums ===
Title	Year	Artist
Unico	2021	Fred De Palma
Manie	2022	Axos

=== Extended plays ===
Titolo	Year	Artist(s)
Io sono	2020	Olly and Yanomi
Nostalgia liquida	2021	Cicco Sanchez
I varfer	2023	Skeeptik

=== Mixtape ===
Title	Year	Artist
PLC Tape 1	2022	Fred De Palma

=== Singles and songs ===
Title	Year	Artist(s)	Album or EP
"Boh, non so"	2018	Shade	Truman
"Young disastro"	2018	Shade	Truman
"Figurati noi"	2018	Shade feat. Emma Muscat	Truman
"Iskido Gang"	2019	Oliver Green and Boro Boro	Non-album singles
"Pietre lunari"	2019	Dunbo feat. Cicco Sanchez	Non-album singles
"Forte"	2020	MamboLosco and Boro Boro	Caldo
"Me gusta"	2020	MamboLosco and Boro Boro	Caldo
"Mes amis"	2020	MamboLosco and Boro Boro	Caldo
"Obsesionada"	2020	Boro Boro feat. Fred De Palma	Non-album singles
"La nuit"	2021	Oliver Green and Axell	Non-album singles
"La notte (RMX)"	2021	Olly and Arisa	Non-album singles
"Lento"	2021	Mida	Non-album singles
"Devo farlo"	2021	Ricky J	Non-album singles
"Katì"	2021	Dargen D'Amico	Nei sogni nessuno è monogamo
"Ci sarò"	2021	Alfa	Non-album singles
"Nena2"	2022	Boro	Non-album singles
"Solito posto, soliti guai"	2022	Tredici Pietro	Non-album singles
"Closer"	2022	Emma Muscat	I Am Emma
"Tori seduti"	2022	Shade e J-Ax	Diversamente triste
"Per non sentire la noia"	2023	Bnkr44	Fuoristrada
"Polvere"	2023	Olly	Gira, il mondo gira
"Cicatrice"	2023	Clara	Primo
"Problems"	2023	Axell	Non-album single
"Cadere giù"	2023	Dani Faiv feat. Olly	Teoria del contrario mixtape vol. 2
"Delincuente"	2023	Boro and Elettra Lamborghini	Non-album singles
"Adrenalina"	2023	Fred De Palma	Non-album singles
"L'unica cosa che vuoi"	2023	Boomdabash	Venduti
"Così come sei"	2023	Albe	Non-album single
"Grazie"	2023	Wax	Wax
"Tutto quello che ho"	2023	Shade	Diversamente triste
"Manette"	2023	Beatrice Quinta feat. VillaBanks	Non-album singles
"Player"	2023	Michele Morrone	Non-album singles
"Bella"	2023	VillaBanks, Boro, Lynch and Juli	VillaBanks
"Assurdo"	2024	Matteo Romano	Non-album single
"Tu lo sai"	2024	Boro and VillaBanks	Bendicion
"Bendicion"	2024	Boro	Bendicion
"Il cielo non ci vuole"	2024	Fred De Palma	Non-album single
"Nei tuoi occhi cosa c'è"	2024	Alfa	Non so chi ha creato il mondo ma so che era innamorato
"Tropo chic (Dragostea din tei)"	2024	Caffellatte and Haiducii	Non-album single
"Apnea"	2024	Emma	Souvenir
"Femme fatale"	2024	Emma	Souvenir
"Hangover"	2024	Emma feat. Baby Gang	Souvenir
"Non siamo voi"	2024	22simba	Isolamento di gruppo
"Tutta un'altra storia"	2024	Boomdabash	Venduti
"Occhi grandi"	2024	Enrico Nigiotti	Maledetti innamorati
"Mi odierai"	2024	Mida	Il sole dentro
"L'ultima poesia"	2024	Geolier and Ultimo	Dio lo sa
"Passione"	2024	Fred De Palma	Non-album single
"Tu sei per me"	2024	Enrico Nigiotti	Maledetti innamorati
"Dammi un senso alla fine"	2024	Sally Cruz, Rose Villain and Mike Defunto	Non-album single
"Bella davvero"	2025	Ultimo	Ultimo Live Stadi 2024
"Domani chissà"	2025	Rocco Hunt	Ragazzo di giù
"Anna"	2025	Alfa	Non so chi ha creato il mondo ma so che era innamorato (Deluxe)
"Amica"	2025	Annalisa	Ma io sono fuoco
"48 ore"	2025	Irama	Antologia della vita e della morte
"Sogni sporchi"	2025	Emis Killa	Musica triste
"Introvabile"	2026	Bresh	Mediterraneo
"Vacci piano"	2026	Emma and Rkomi	Non-album single
"Temporali"	2026	Enrico Nigiotti	Maledetti innamorati
"Maledetti innamorati"	2026	Enrico Nigiotti	Maledetti innamorati
"È successo per caso"	2026	Enrico Nigiotti	Maledetti innamorati
