= Olly discography =

Discography of Italian singer-songwriter and rapper Olly

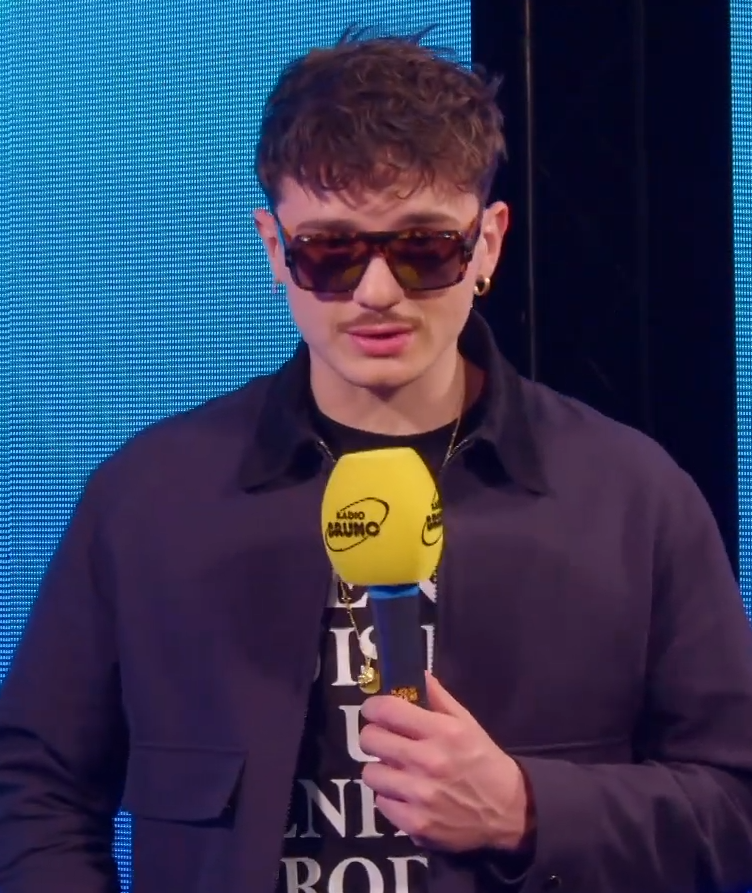
- Olly interviewed in February 2025
- Studio albums: 2
- EPs: 4
- Mixtapes: 1
- Singles: 37

The discography of Italian Italian singer-songwriter and rapper Olly consists of two studio albums, one mixtape, fourth EP and thirty-seven singles.

== Studio albums ==
List of albums with details
Title	Album details	Peak chart positions		Certifications
Title	Album details	ITA	SWI	Certifications
Gira, il mondo gira (with Juli)	Released: 10 February 2023; Label: Aleph, Epic; Format: CD, LP, digital download, streaming	13	—	FIMI: 2× Platinum
Tutta vita (with Juli)	Released: 25 October 2024; Label: Epic; Format: CD, LP, digital download, streaming	1	40	FIMI: Diamond
"—" denotes album that did not chart or were not released.

== Mixtape albums ==
List of mixtape albums with album details
Title	Mixtape details
Piacere Mixtape (Note: As part of Madmut Branco.)	Released: 2016; Label: Independent

== Extended plays ==
List of EPs with details
Title	EP details
Namaste (with Matsby)	Released: 17 July 2017; Label: Independent
CRY4U (with Yanomi)	Released: 15 June 2018; Label: Independent
Io sono (with Yanomi)	Released: 6 November 2020; Label: Independent
Il mondo gira (with Juli)	Released: 21 July 2022; Label: Aleph, Epic

== Singles ==
=== As lead artist ===
List of singles as lead artist, with selected chart positions, showing year released and album name
Title	Year	Peak chart positions		Certifications	Album or EP
Title	Year	ITA	SWI	Certifications	Album or EP
"Bla-Bla Car" (with Yanomi)	2018	—	—		Non-album singles
"Bevi" (with Eames)	2019	—	—		Non-album singles
"Best Seller" (featuring Alfa)	2019	—	—		Non-album singles
"Il primo amore" (with Yanomi)	2019	—	—		Non-album singles
"Dimmi quando" (with Yanomi)	2019	—	—		Non-album singles
"Non mi va" (with Yanomi)	2020	—	—		Non-album singles
"Mai e poi mai" (with Yanomi)	2020	—	—		Io sono
"Winston Blue" (with Yanomi)	2020	—	—		Io sono
"Non mi va" (with Yanomi)	2021	—	—		Non-album singles
"Non ho paura" (with Oliver Green e Juli)	2021	—	—		Non-album singles
"Lego" (with Juli)	2021	—	—		Non-album singles
"La notte (RMX)" (with Arisa)	2021	—	—		Non-album singles
"Hai fatto bene" (with Juli)	2021	—	—		Non-album singles
"Scuba Diving" (with Juli)	2022	—	—		Non-album singles
"Un'altra volta" (with Juli)	2022	—	—	FIMI: Gold	Il mondo gira
"Siamo noi" (with Oliver Green, Juli and Axos)	2022	—	—		Non-album singles
"Fidati di me" (with Juli)	2022	—	—		Non-album singles
"Fammi morire" (with Juli)	2022	—	—		Il mondo gira
"L'anima balla" (with Juli)	2022	—	—	FIMI: Gold	Il mondo gira
"Polvere"	2023	14	—	FIMI: Platinum	Gira, il mondo gira
"La notte vola (RMX)" (with Juli and Lorella Cuccarini)	2023	—	—	FIMI: Gold	Gira, il mondo gira
"Tutto con te" (with Juli)	2023	—	—		Gira, il mondo gira
"A squarciagola" (with Juli)	2023	77	—	FIMI: Gold	Tutta vita
"Devastante" (with Juli)	2024	6	—	FIMI: 3× Platinum	Tutta vita
"Ho voglia di te" (with Juli and Emma)	2024	20	—	FIMI: Platinum	Non-album single
"Per due come noi" (with Angelina Mango and Juli)	2024	1	—	FIMI: 3× Platinum	Tutta vita
"Quei ricordi là" (with Juli)	2024	15	—	FIMI: Platinum	Tutta vita
"Balorda nostalgia" (with Juli)	2025	1	6	FIMI: 4× Platinum; IFPI SWI: Gold	Tutta vita
"Depresso fortunato" (with Juli)	2025	8	—	FIMI: Platinum	Tutta vita
"Questa domenica" (with Juli)	2025	1	—	FIMI: 2× Platinum	Tutta vita
"—" denotes a single that did not chart or was not released.

=== As featured artist ===
List of singles and album name
Title	Year	Album or EP
"Chiara Ferragni" (Alfa featuring Olly and Matsby)	2017	Non-album singles
"Amigos (Remix)" (Vagae featuring Olly and CLVB)	2018	Non-album singles
"La chiave" (Jacopo Bagorda featuring Olly)	2019	Non-album singles
"Diverso" (Matsby and Joe Viegas featuring Olly and Yanomi)	2019	Non-album singles
"Bevo tutta la notte" (Alfa featuring Drast and Olly)	2021	Nord

== Other charted songs ==
List of other charted songs, with peak chart positions, showing year released and album name
Title	Year	Peak chart positions	Certifications	Album or EP
Title	Year	ITA	Certifications	Album or EP
"Menomale che c'è il mare" (with Juli)	2023	40	FIMI: Platinum	Gira, il mondo gira
"Bianca" (with Juli)	2023	80	FIMI: Gold	Gira, il mondo gira
"È festa" (with Juli)	2024	59	FIMI: Gold	Tutta vita
"I cantieri del Giappone" (with Juli)	2024	57	FIMI: Gold	Tutta vita
"Noi che" (with Juli)	2024	60		Tutta vita
"A noi non serve far l'amore" (with Juli)	2024	66	FIMI: Gold	Tutta vita
"Sopra la stessa barca" (with Juli featuring Enrico Nigiotti)	2024	62		Tutta vita
"Scarabocchi" (with Juli)	2024	6	FIMI: 2× Platinum	Tutta vita
"Così così" (with Juli)	2025	4	FIMI: Gold	Tutta vita (sempre)
"Il brivido della vita" (with Juli)	2025	7	FIMI: Gold	Tutta vita (sempre)
"Come noi non c'è nessuno" (with Juli)	2025	24		Tutta vita (sempre)
"Occhi color mare" (with Juli)	2025	11	FIMI: Gold	Tutta vita (sempre)
"Buon trasloco" (with Juli)	2025	6	FIMI: Gold	Tutta vita (sempre)

== Collaborations ==
List of song and album name
Title	Year	Peak chart positions	Album
Title	Year	ITA	Album
"Black Room Posse" (Eames e FJLO featuring Olly)	2019	—	IV
"Cadere giù" (Dani Faiv featuring Olly)	2023	—	Teoria del contrario mixtape vol. 2
"L'amore è / L'amore va" (Enrico Nigiotti featuring Olly and Juli)	2026	25	Maledetti innamorati
"—" denotes a song that did not chart or was not released.

== Author and composer for other artists ==
List of selected songs co-written by Olly
Title	Year	Artist	Album
"L'unica cosa che vuoi"	2023	Boomdabash	Venduti
"Tutta un'altra storia"	2023	Boomdabash	Venduti
"Amore disperato"	2024	Achille Lauro	Comuni mortali
"Hangover"	2024	Emma feat. Baby Gang	Souvenir Extended Edition
"Tacchi (fra le dita)"	2024	Sarah Toscano	Met Gala
"Domani chissà"	2025	Rocco Hunt	Ragazzo di giù
"Brutta storia"	2025	Emma and Juli	Non-album single
