= Mida discography =

Discography of Italian-Venezuelan singer-songwriter Mida

- EPs: 1
- Singles: 35
- Music videos: 30

The discography of Italian-Venezuelan singer-songwriter Mida consists one EP, thirty-five singles and thirty music videos.

== Extended plays ==
List of EPs and with selected chart positions
Title	EP details	Peak chart positions	Certifications
Title	EP details	ITA	Certifications
Il sole dentro	Released: 17 May 2024; Label: Believe Music; Format: CD, digital download, streaming	9	FIMI: Gold

== Singles ==
=== As lead artist ===
List of singles, with chart positions and album name
Title	Year	Peak chart positions	Certifications	Album or EP
Title	Year	ITA	Certifications	Album or EP
"Casinò"	2015	—		Non-album singles
"Solitamente"	2016	—		Non-album singles
"Ratatah Freestyle"	2016	—		Non-album singles
"Ovidio Freestyle"	2016	—		Non-album singles
"Per sempre"	2016	—		Non-album singles
"Ratatah Freestyle #2"	2017	—		Non-album singles
"Maledetto"	2017	—		Non-album singles
"Bevo"	2020	—		Non-album singles
"Ratatah Freestyle #3"	2020	—		Non-album singles
"Davvero"	2020	—		Non-album singles
"MMM"	2020	—		Non-album singles
"Dinero"	2020	—		Non-album singles
"Stavo giù"	2021	—		Non-album singles
"16:20"	2021	—		Non-album singles
"Ricordarmi di scordarti"	2021	—	FIMI: Platinum	Non-album singles
"Lento"	2021	—		Non-album singles
"Stupido sentimento"	2022	—		Non-album singles
"Fidati di me" (with Olly and Juli)	2022	—		Non-album singles
"Ti sta bene"	2022	—		Non-album singles
"Malditè"	2022	—		Non-album singles
"Casa"	2023	—		Non-album singles
"Fuori posto"	2023	—		Non-album singles
"Oro"	2023	—		Non-album singles
"Rossofuoco"	2023	2	FIMI: 2x Platinum	Il sole dentro
"Mi odierai"	2023	—		Il sole dentro
"Fight Club"	2024	79		Il sole dentro
"Que pasa"	2024	69		Il sole dentro
"Morire x te"	2024	—		Non-album singles
"L'antidoto"	2025	—		Non-album singles
"Popolare" (with Michele Bravi)	2025	83		Non-album singles
"Bad Boys Don't Cry" (featuring VillaBanks)	2025	—		Non-album singles
"Semplicemente" (with Sarah Toscano)	2025	46		Met Gala
"Canzone d'amore"	2026	—		Non-album single
"Un bel casino"	2026	—		Non-album single
"—" denotes singles that did not chart or were not released.

=== As featured artist ===
List of singles as featured artist
Title	Year	Peak chart positions	Certifications
Title	Year	ITA	Certifications
"Bacio di Giuda" (Ava featuring Mida and VillaBanks)	2024	14	FIMI: Platinum

== Collaborations ==
List of songs as featured artist
Title	Year	Album or EP
"Slide (passo dopo passo)" (Nicola Siciliano featuring Mida)	2020	Napoli 51

== Author for other artists ==
Listed of selected songs co-written by Mida
Song	Year	Artist(s)
"Veleno di vipera"	2023	Wayne Santana
"Isola grattacielo"	2024	Ginevra Lamborghini
"Gira"	2026	Riccardo Stimolo

== Album and soundtrack appearances ==
=== Compilation ===
Title	Year	Album
"Que pasa"	2024	Battiti Live 2024

=== Soundtrack ===
Title	Year	Movies/Series
"Semplicemente" (with Sarah Toscano; theme song)	2025	Riv4lries

== Music videos ==
Title	Year	Director(s)
"Solitamente"	2016	Gianluca Colombo
"Ratatah Freestyle"	2016	Alessandro Maiorano
"Ovidio Freestyle"	2016	Alessandro Maiorano
"Per sempre"	2016	Alessandro Maiorano
"Ratatah Freestyle #2"	2017	Alessandro Maiorano
"Maledetto"	2017	Alessandro Maiorano and Giammarco Boscariol
"Bevo"	2020	Corrado Perria and Paolo Maneglia
"Ratatah Freestyle #3"	2020	Alessandro Maiorano
"Davvero"	2020	Alessandro Maiorano
"MMM"	2020	Alessandro Maiorano
"Dinero"	2020	Alessandro Maiorano
"16:20"	2021	Alessandro Maiorano
"Ricordarmi di scordarti"	2021	Alessandro Maiorano
"Stupido sentimento"	2022	Alessandro Maiorano
"Fidati di me"	2022	Alessandro Maiorano
"Ti sta bene"	2022	Alessandro Maiorano
"Casa"	2023	Alessandro Maiorano
"Oro"	2023	Alessandro Maiorano
"Rossofuoco"	2023	Alessandro Maiorano
"Mi odierai"	2023	Alessandro Maiorano
"Fight Club"	2024	Alessandro Maiorano
"Que pasa"	2024	Alessandro Maiorano
"Bacio di Giuda"	2024	—
"Morire x te"	2024	Alessandro Maiorano
"L'antidoto"	2025	Alessandro Maiorano
"Popolare"	2025	Dominga Lussone
"Bad Boys Don't Cry"	2025	Alessandro Maiorano
"Semplicemente"	2025	Amedeo Zancanella
"Canzone d'amore"	2026	Alessandro Maiorano
"Un bel casino"	2026	Alessandro Maiorano
