= Camilla Ghini =

Italian television presenter, radio personality, actress and model (born 1994)

- Born: Camilla Ghini; 22 March 1994 (age 32); Rome, Italy
- Occupations: Television presenter; radio personality; actress; model
- Height: 1.68 m (5 ft 6.14 in)
- Parents: Massimo Ghini (father); Federica Lorrai (mother)

Camilla Ghini (born 22 March 1994) is an Italian television presenter, radio personality, actress and model.

== Biography ==
Born in 1994 in Rome to her mother Federica Lorrai and her father Massimo Ghini (actor and theater director), Camilla has a twin brother, Lorenzo, a half-brother, Leonardo, and a half-sister, Margherita, both born from her father's marriage to the former costume designer Paola Romano. After primary school, she decided to enroll in the classical high school in her hometown.

== Career ==
In 2008, at the age of fifteen, she appeared in the television miniseries Raccontami. After graduating from high school, she left Rome to move to Milan, where she began attending her first communication internships and working for the production company 3zero2TV. In 2012, she appeared in the short film Poor Unfortunate Souls directed by Matteo Piccinini.

In September 2016, once she returned to Rome, she began to take her first steps in the world of entertainment, joining the cast of collaborators of the judicial program broadcast on Canale 5 Forum and on Rete 4 with Lo sportello di Forum.

Since 2019 she has started working as a radio host for radio stations such as RTL 102.5 and Radio Zeta. From 2019 to 2021 she hosted the night program Nessun dorma on RTL 102.5, while in 2020 she hosted the program La famiglia giù al nord on RTL 102.5. In September of the same year she appeared in the film La mia banda suona il pop directed by Fausto Brizzi. In 2021 and 2022 she hosted the program Miseria e nobiltà on RTL 102.5, while from 2021 to 2023 she hosted AperiZeta on Radio Zeta.

In 2022 and 2023, together with Paola Di Benedetto and Jody Cecchetto, she hosted the musical event Radio Zeta Future Hits Live, broadcast on Radio Zeta TV, RTL 102.5 TV, TV8 and Sky Uno. In 2023 she appeared in the film Romantic Girls (Romantiche) directed by Pilar Fogliati. In 2023 and 2024 she hosted the program Suite 102.5 on RTL 102.5. Since 2024, after leaving RTL 102.5 and Radio Zeta, she began working for Radio 105, where from May 2024 she began hosting the program 105 Village on weekends. Since November, she has hosted the program 105 Take Away on Radio 105, together with Daniele Battaglia and Diletta Leotta, who had already replaced the latter in September. On December 31, together with Alan Palmieri, he hosted the event Insieme nel 2025, broadcast on Radionorba TV.

== Television programs ==
Year	Title	Network	Role
2016–present	Forum	Canale 5	Collaborator
2016–present	Lo sportello di Forum	Rete 4	Collaborator
2022–2023	Radio Zeta Future Hits Live	Radio Zeta TV; RTL 102.5 TV; TV8; Sky Uno	Co-host
2024–2025	Insieme nel 2025	Radionorba TV	Co-host
2026	105 Summer Festival	Radio 105 TV	Co-host

== Radio ==
Year	Title	Network	Role
2019–2021	Nessun dorma	RTL 102.5	Conductor
2020	La famiglia giù al nord	RTL 102.5	Conductor
2021–2022	Miseria e nobiltà	RTL 102.5	Conductor
2021–2023	AperiZeta	Radio Zeta	Conductor
2023–2024	Suite 102.5	RTL 102.5	Conductor
2024–present	105 Village	Radio 105	Conductor
2024–present	105 Take Away	Radio 105	Conductor

== Filmography ==
=== Film ===
Year	Title	Director
2020	La mia banda suona il pop	Fausto Brizzi
2023	Romantic Girls (Romantiche)	Pilar Fogliati
2027	Fidanzato part-time	Francesco Prisco

=== Television ===
Year	Title	Network
2008	Raccontami	Rai 1

=== Short films ===
Year	Title	Director
2012	Poor Unfortunate Souls	Matteo Piccinini

=== Music videos ===
Year	Title	Artist(s)	Director
2026	"Popolare"	Michele Bravi and Mida	Dominga Lussone
