= Mida (singer) =

Italian-Venezuelan singer-songwriter (born 1999)

- Born: Christian Prestato; 16 December 1999 (age 26); Caracas, Venezuela
- Genres: Pop; pop rap; R&B
- Occupations: Singer; songwriter
- Instruments: Vocals; guitar; piano
- Works: Discography
- Years active: 2015–present
- Labels: Blocco Recordz (2015–2018); Dinero (2020–present); Believe Music (2021–present)

Christian Prestato (born 16 December 1999), known professionally as Mida, is an Italian-Venezuelan singer-songwriter.

== Early life and education ==
Born in 1999 in Caracas to a Venezuelan mother and an Italian father, Mida grew up in Venezuela and then moved with his parents to Milan as a child, where he continued his studies and had the opportunity to make important contacts in the world of music, a passion he began cultivating at the age of eleven.

== Career ==
=== Recording debut ===
He began releasing his first tracks in 2015 after signing with the Blocco Recordz label, founded by rapper Emis Killa and his manager, Zanna. He began his career by releasing several songs, including "Casino", "Solitamente", "Ratatah Freestyle", "Ovidio Freestyle", "Per sempre", "Ratatah Freestyle #2", "Maledetto" and "Bevo".

=== 2020–2023: signing with Dinero and Sanremo Giovani ===
After a hiatus of about two years, in 2020, after signing a contract with the Dinero label, he released the songs "Ratatah Freestyle #3", "Davvero", "MMM", and "Dinero", and dueted on Nicola Siciliano's song "Slide (passo dopo passo)", from the album Napoli 51. In 2021, the singles "Stavo giù", "16:20", "Ricordami di scordarti" (certified platinum) and "Lento" were released. The following year, in 2022, he released the singles "Stupido sentimento", "Fidati di me" (in collaboration with Olly and Juli) and "Ti sta bene".

On 16 December 2022, he participated in the final of Sanremo Giovani 2022 with the song "Malditè", in which he placed seventh, failing to access the Sanremo Music Festival 2023. In June 2023, he was one of the authors of Wayne Santana's single "Veleno di vipera", while in July his new single "Oro" was released.

=== 2023–2024: Amici 23 and Il sole dentro ===
In September 2023 participated in the auditions for the twenty-third edition of the musical talent show Amici di Maria De Filippi broadcast on Canale 5, then accessing the initial phase. In November he was one of the authors of the single "Isola grattacielo" of Ginevra Lamborghini. In February 2024 he gained access to the evening phase of the program by joining the team led by professors Lorella Cuccarini and Emanuel Lo and the following May he reached the final, finishing sixth and winning the Spotify singles prize.

During the program, he released several new songs, including "Rossofuoco", "Mi odierai", "Fight Club" and "Que pasa" All four of these songs were later included in his first EP, Il sole dentro, released on 17 May 2024, which also included the song of the same name and the song "Vita terremoto". The EP peaked at number nine on the FIMI Album chart and certified gold, while the song "Rossofuoco" peaked at number two on the FIMI Top Singles chart and was certified double platinum. A Spanish version of the latter, "Rojofuego", was also released. In the summer of the same year, he performed at several musical events, including the "RDS Summer Festival", "Battiti Live", "105 Summer Festival" and "Yoga Radio Bruno Estate". On 14 June 2024, Mida featured alongside VillaBanks in Ava's single "Bacio di Giuda", which went platinum. On 8 November, she released the single "Morire x te". The "Il sole dentro club tour 2024" took place on 3, 7, and 8 December, featuring three live concerts in clubs in Milan, Naples and Rome.

=== 2025–present: new projects ===
On 21 March 2025, the single "L'antidoto" was released, followed on 23 May by the single "Popolare" with Michele Bravi. On 18 July, the single "Bad Boys Don't Cry" was released, featuring VillaBanks. The "Mida Summer tour 2025" took place from 1 May to 19 August.

On 12 September 2025 the single "Semplicemente" with Sarah Toscano was released. The song premiered live on 2 September at Future Hits Live at the Verona Arena and was created as the theme song for the Netflix series Riv4lries. On 16 January 2026 the single "Canzone d'amore" was released, followed on 22 May by the single "Un bel casino".

== Tours ==
- 2024 – Mida Summer tour 2024
- 2024 – Il sole dentro club tour 2024
- 2025 – Mida Summer tour 2025

== Television programs ==
Year	Title	Network	Notes
2023–2024	Amici di Maria De Filippi	Canale 5	Contestant (season 23)
2024	This Is Me	Canale 5	Guest

== Participation in singing events ==
- Sanremo Giovani (Rai 1)
  - 2022 – Not a finalist with "Malditè"

== Awards and nominations ==
Year	Award	Nomination	Work	Result	Notes
2024	Amici di Maria De Filippi	Spotify singles Award	Himself	Won	
2024	Music Awards	Multi-platinum single award	"Rossofuoco"	Won	
