= Ghini =

Ghini is an Italian surname. Notable people with the surname include:

- Alessandro Ghini (born 1961), Italian former rugby union player and a current coach
- Camilla Ghini (born 1994), Italian television presenter, radio personality, actress and model
- Giovanni di Lapo Ghini (fl. 14th-century), Italian architect working in Florence
- Luca Ghini (1490–1556), Italian physician and botanist
- Massimo Ghini (born 1954), Italian actor
- Simone Ghini (1406/07–1491), Italian Renaissance sculptor from Florence

== Also ==
- Palazzo Ghini, palace of the aristocratic Ghini family in Cesena, Italy
