= Sentric Music =

British independent music publisher

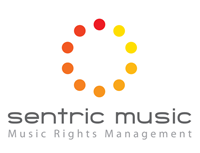
- Parent company: Believe Music
- Founded: 2006; 19 years ago
- Founder: Chris Meehan
- Location: Liverpool, UK
- Official website: sentricmusic.com

Sentric Music is a British independent music publisher created by emerging songwriters and artists.

In February 2022, Sentric was acquired by the Swiss fin tech company Utopia Music. In March 2023, Utopia Music sold Sentric to the French record company Believe Music for €47 million (US$51 million).

== Company profile ==
Founded in 2006, Sentric has its headquarters in Liverpool, England and staff across Europe. The company administers the works of over 100,000 artists and writers, covering more than 1 million songs globally.

Sentric publishes their writers' work in the UK via PRS for Music and the MCPS collection societies.

In May 2012, the North West Fund for Digital & Creative, managed by AXM Venture Capital Limited, made an equity investment into Sentric Music.

As well as collecting royalties for their writers, Sentric seeks synchronisation opportunities for its writers, having previously placed music in advertisements for companies such as Lexus, O2 Germany, and De Montfort University. In February 2013, Sentric was nominated at the Music+Sound Awards in the Best Sync: Trailers and Promos category for the use of Kankouran's song "Rivers" in the trailer for Series 6 of Skins.

In June 2012, Sentric Music entered into a co-publishing agreement with Brussels-based Strictly Confidential, the publishing arm of PIAS. The first two artists signed under the co-publishing agreement were Tall Ships and Cattle & Cane.

In February 2013, Sentric Music's CEO, Chris Meehan, was included in the Music Week "30 Under Thirty" list, recognising notable young professionals in the UK music industry.

A partnership with INgrooves Music Publishing was announced in July 2013. IN Grooves Music Publishing is a new division of IN Grooves headed by industry veteran Olivier Chastan. As part of the partnership, Sentric Music provides worldwide rights administration and platform services.

In early 2014, Sentric launched a new brand & artist services division with the intention of adding value to brands through the artists and songwriters that the company works with.

Spring 2014 saw Sentric win a collaborative Technology Strategy Board bid to invest in its rights management system. Working in conjunction with Imperial College London, the eighteen-month big data project, titled Data Exploration and Predictive Analytics for Music Publishing, aimed to create tools for predictive modelling and data visualisation for use in the music publishing industry.

In March 2017, Sentric Music secured a multimillion-pound investment from UK-based venture capital business BGF. In June 2017, Sentric Music signed an administration deal with Chinese independent music firm Modern Sky Entertainment.

In July 2018, music distributor Tunecore partnered with Sentric, granting access to Sentric's technology and global collection network while enhancing Tunecore's distribution and publishing administration services. Since that time, Sentric has represented Believe's Tunecore Music Publishing.

In February 2022, it was announced that Sentric Music had been acquired by the Switzerland-headquartered fintech company, Utopia Music. It was also announced that Sentric Music's CEO, Chris Meehan, would join Utopia Music as Vice President of Royalty Management Services.

In March 2023, Utopia sold Sentric to the French record company Believe Music for €47 million (US$51 million).

== Awards ==
In August 2014, Sentric Music was nominated in the Sync Team (Independent Publisher) and Sync Individual Placement (TV Show: Sports) categories at the Music Week Sync Awards 2014.

In December 2010, Sentric Music was the winner of the Virtual Business Awards 2010.
