= Brutta storia =

Single by Emma and Juli
- Released: 3 October 2025
- Genre: Pop
- Length: 3:24
- Label: Island
- Songwriters: Emma Marrone; Federico Olivieri; Paolo Antonacci; Julien Boverod
- Producer: Juli

Emma singles chronology
"Hangover" (2024)	"Brutta storia" (2025)	"Vacci piano" (2026)

Juli singles chronology
"Questa domenica" (2025)	"Brutta storia" (2025)	"Quelli come me" (2026)

Music video
- "Brutta storia" on YouTube

"Brutta storia" (transl. Bad story) is a song co-written and recorded by Italian singer Emma and Italian record producer Juli. It was released on 3 October 2025 by Island.

== Description ==
Following the closure of Capitol Records by Universal Music Italia in October 2024, Emma moved to the group's label Island Records.

The label change was announced with the single, written by the singer-songwriter herself with Paolo Antonacci and Federico Olivieri, aka Olly, the latter also authors of the music with Julien Boverod, aka Juli, the song's producer.

== Promotion ==
The release of the song was revealed by the singer-songwriter herself on the evening of 30 September 2025 through her social media profiles.

== Music video ==
A music video of "Brutta storia", directed by Bogdan Plakov, was released on the same day via Emma's YouTube channel.

== Charts ==
Weekly chart performance for "Brutta storia"
Chart (2024)	Peak position
Italy (FIMI)	60
Italy Airplay (EarOne)	1
