= Fight Club (song) =

Single by Mida

from the EP Il sole dentro
- Released: 5 March 2024
- Genre: Dance-pop
- Length: 2:30
- Label: Believe Music
- Songwriters: Christian Prestato; Gian Vito Vizzi; Giuseppe Salvatore Marra; Max Elias Kleinschmidt; Vincenzo Centrella; Vito Petrozzino
- Producer: GRND

Mida singles chronology
"Mi odierai" (2023)	"Fight Club" (2024)	"Que pasa" (2024)

Music video
- "Fight Club" on YouTube

"Fight Club" is a song by Italian singer-songwriter Mida. It was released on 5 March 2024 by Believe Music the third single from the first EP Il sole dentro.

== Description ==
The song, written by the singer-songwriter himself with Gian Vito Vizzi, Giuseppe Salvatore Marra, Max Elias Kleinschmidt, Vincenzo Centrella and Vito Petrozzino, was produced by Gianmarco Grande, aka GRND.

== Promotion ==
The song was previewed during the twenty-third edition of the talent show Amici di Maria De Filippi.

== Music video ==
The music video, directed by Alessandro Maiorano, was published on 17 May 2024 via Mida's YouTube channel.

== Charts ==
Chart performance for "Fight Club"
Chart (2024)	Peak position
Italy (FIMI)	79
