= Il sole dentro =

EP by Mida
- Released: 17 May 2024
- Genre: Pop
- Length: 15:45
- Language: Italian
- Label: Believe Music
- Producer: Etta; GRND; Juli; Macs

Singles from Il sole dentro
- 1. "Rossofuoco" Released: 7 October 2023; 2. "Mi odierai" Released: 12 December 2023; 3. "Fight Club" Released: 5 March 2024; 4. "Que pasa" Released: 30 April 2024

Il sole dentro (transl. The sun inside) is the debut extended play by Italian singer Mida. It was released on 17 May 2024 by Believe Music.

== Description ==
The album, consisting of six songs and produced by Emanuele Cotto, aka Etta Matters or more simply Etta, Gianmarco Grande, aka GRND, and Julien Boverod, aka Juli, was released during Mida's participation in the twenty-third edition of the talent show Amici di Maria De Filippi.

== Promotion ==
To promote the album, the singer-songwriter was busy with a tour that saw him perform, in the summer, in various music festivals and in Italian and European clubs.

== Track listing ==
Il sole dentro track listing
No.	Title	Writer(s)	Producer(s)	Length
1.	"Vita terremoto"	Christian Prestato; Gianmarco Grande; Emanuele Cotto; Massimo Barberis; Tommaso Santoni	Etta	2:02
2.	"Il sole dentro"	Prestato; Grande; Cotto; Barberis; Santoni	Etta	2:20
3.	"Rossofuoco"	Prestato; Grande; Cotto; Barberis; Santoni	Etta; GRND; Macs	2:42
4.	"Que pasa"	Prestato; Grande; Elisa Mariotti; Santoni	GRND	2:44
5.	"Mi odierai"	Christian Prestato; Daniele Fossatelli; Julien Boverod	Juli	3:27
6.	"Fight Club"	Prestato; Gian Vito Vizzi; Gian Vito Vizzi; Giuseppe Salvatore Marra; Max Elias Kleinschmidt; Vincenzo Centrella; Vito Petrozzino	GRND	2:30

== Charts ==
Chart performance for Il sole dentro
Chart (2024)	Peak position
Italian Albums (FIMI)	9

== Certifications ==
Certifications for "Il sole dentro"
Region	Certification	Certified units/sales
Italy (FIMI)	Gold	25,000^{‡}
^{‡} Sales+streaming figures based on certification alone.
