= Rossofuoco =

Single by Mida

from the EP Il sole dentro
- Released: 7 October 2023
- Genre: Power ballad
- Length: 2:42
- Label: Believe Music
- Songwriters: Christian Prestato; Emanuele Cotto; Gianmarco Grande; Massimo Barberis; Tommaso Santoni
- Producers: Etta; GRND; Macs

Mida singles chronology
"Oro" (2023)	"Rossofuoco" (2023)	"Mi odierai" (2023)

Music video
- "Rossofuoco" on YouTube

"Rossofuoco" is a song by Italian singer-songwriter Mida. It was released on 7 October 2023 by Believe Music the first single from the first EP Il sole dentro.

== Description ==
The song, written by the singer-songwriter himself with Emanuele Cotto, aka Etta Matters or simply Etta, Gianmarco Grande, aka GRND, Massimo Barberis, aka Macs, and Tommaso Santoni, aka Rondine, was produced by Etta, GRND, and Macs. A Spanish version of the song, titled "Rojofuego," was also released.

== Promotion ==
The song was previewed during the twenty-third edition of the talent show Amici di Maria De Filippi.

== Music video ==
The music video, directed by Alessandro Maiorano, was published on 17 May 2024 via Mida's YouTube channel.

== Charts ==
=== Weekly charts ===
Chart performance for "Rossofuoco"
Chart (2024)	Peak position
Italy (FIMI)	2

=== Year-end charts ===
2024 year-end chart performance for "Rossofuoco"
Chart (2024)	Position
Italy (FIMI)	43

== Certifications ==
Certifications for "Rossofuoco"
Region	Certification	Certified units/sales
Italy (FIMI)	2× Platinum	200,000^{‡}
^{‡} Sales+streaming figures based on certification alone.
