= Enrico Nigiotti =

Italian singer-songwriter (born 1987)

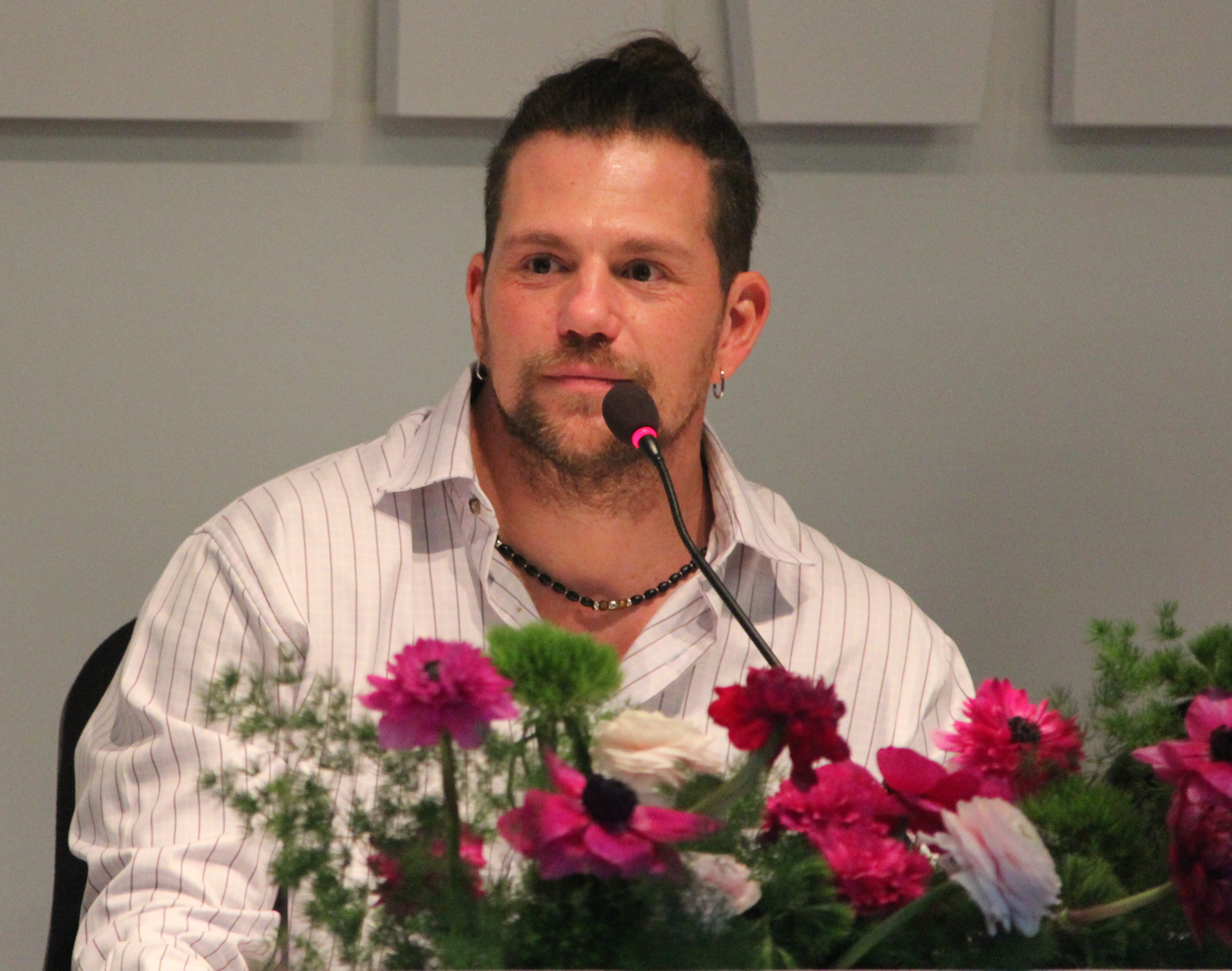
- Enrico Nigiotti in February 2026

Background information
- Born: 11 June 1987 (age 39); Livorno, Tuscany, Italy
- Genre: Pop-rock
- Occupations: Singer; songwriter
- Instruments: Vocals; guitar
- Years active: 2008–present
- Labels: Sugar Music (2008–2010); Universal Music Italia (2012–2017, 2020–2023); Polydor (2016, 2021-2023); Sony Music (2017-2020, 2024–present); RCA (2017–2019); Columbia (2020, 2024–present)

Enrico Nigiotti (Italian pronunciation: [enˈriko niˈdʒɔtti]; born 11 June 1987) is an Italian singer-songwriter.

Rosing in fame as a contestant of Italian talent show Amici di Maria De Filippi and X Factor, Nigiotti published four studio albums and several singles. He participated two times at the Sanremo Music Festival and wrote songs for several singers, including Laura Pausini and Eros Ramazzotti.

== Life and career ==
After signing a recording deal with Sugar Music, he released his debut single, "Addio", in 2008. Between 2009 and 2010, he was a contestant in the ninth series of Italian talent show Amici di Maria De Filippi. He decided to leave the competition to avoid an elimination round against his then-girlfriend, dancer Elena D'Amario. His eponymous extended play was released by Sugar on 26 March 2010, and entered the top 50 of the FIMI Italian Albums Chart.

In 2015, Nigiotti competed in the Newcomers' section of the 65th Sanremo Music Festival, performing the song "Qualcosa da decidere". After advancing in the first elimination round, he was eliminated during one of the two semi-finals by eventual winner Giovanni Caccamo. The song was released as the lead single from his first full-length studio album, also titled Qualcosa da decidere and released by Universal Music Group's label Go Wild. The album failed to achieve commercial success.

In 2017, Nigiotti auditioned for the eleventh series of the Italian version of X Factor. He placed third in the final, and signed with Sony Music Italy. His single "L'amore è" peaked at number 4 on the Italian FIMI Singles Chart and was included in the EP with the same title, also including covers previously performed during the live shows.

After releasing the singles "Nel silenzio di mille parole" and "Complici", performed in a duet with Gianna Nannini, Nigiotti released the album Cenerentola (Sony Music Italy) in Autumn 2018. In 2018 a songwriter, he wrote songs for Laura Pausini and Eros Ramazzotti. In February 2019, he competed in the 69th Sanremo Music Festival with the song "Nonno Hollywood", which received the Lunezia Award for Best Music-Literary Value among the contest's entries.

He participated at the Sanremo Music Festival 2020 with the song "Baciami adesso". The song was included in Nigiotti fourth studio album Nigio, published on February 14, 2020. In 2021 he was a coach in the first season of the television show The Band 1 on Rai 1, winning the program. After a one-year recording hiatus, in 2024 he released three singles "In punta di piedi", "Occhi grandi" and "Tu sei per me", performing the later with Noemi on the TV program This Is Me.

On 30 November 2025, he was announced among the participants of the Sanremo Music Festival 2026. He competed with the song "Ogni volta che non so volare".

== Discography ==
=== Studio albums ===
Title	Album details	Peak chart positions	Certifications
Title	Album details	ITA	Certifications
Enrico Nigiotti	Released: 26 March 2010; Label: Sony Music; Format: CD, LP, digital download, streaming	44	
Qualcosa da decidere	Released: 12 February 2015; Label: Sony Music; Format: CD, LP, digital download, streaming	—	
Cenerentola	Released: 15 September 2018; Label: Sony Music; Format: CD, LP, digital download, streaming	15	FIMI: Gold
Nigio	Released: 14 February 2020; Label: Sony Music; Format: CD, LP, digital download, streaming	23	
Maledetti innamorati	Released: 13 March 2026; Label: Sony Music; Format: CD, LP, digital download, streaming	8	
"—" denotes a recording that did not chart in that territory.

=== Extended plays ===
Title	Album details	Peak chart positions
Title	Album details	ITA
L'amore è	Released: 8 December 2017; Label: RCA; Format: CD, digital download	29

=== Singles ===
Single	Year	Peak chart positions	Certifications	Album or EP
Single	Year	ITA	Certifications	Album or EP
"Addio"	2008	—		Enrico Nigiotti
"Qualcosa da decidere"	2015	69		Qualcosa da decidere
"Ora che non è tardi"	2015	—		Qualcosa da decidere
"Il ritmo dell'amore"	2016	—		Qualcosa da decidere
"L'amore è"	2017	4	FIMI: 2× Platinum	L'amore è
"Nel silenzio di mille parole"	2018	34		Cenerentola
"Complici" (featuring Gianna Nannini)	2018	31	FIMI: Gold	Cenerentola
"Nonno Hollywood"	2019	11	FIMI: Gold	Cenerentola
"Notturna'"	2019	—		Nigio
"Baciami adesso"	2020	28	FIMI: Gold	Nigio
"Para el sol"	2020	—		Nigio
"Notti di luna"	2021	—		Nigio
"Ninna nanna"	2023	—		Non-album singles
"In punta di piedi"	2024	—		Non-album singles
"Occhi grandi"	2024	—		Maledetti innamorati
"Tu sei per me"	2024	91	FIMI: Gold	Maledetti innamorati
"Passatempo"	2025	—		Maledetti innamorati
"Ogni volta che non so volare"	2026	27		Maledetti innamorati
"En e Xanax" (featuring Alfa)	2026	80		Maledetti innamorati
"—" denotes a recording that did not chart in that territory.

=== Other charted songs ===
Single	Year	Album or EP
"L'amore è / L'amore va" (with Olly and Juli)	25	Maledetti innamorati

=== Collaborations ===
Single	Year	Peak chart positions	Album
Single	Year	ITA	Album
"Sopra la stessa barca" (Olly and Juli featuring Enrico Nigiotti)	2024	62	Tutta vita
