= Anime di carta =

Studio album by Michele Bravi
- Released: 24 February 2017
- Genre: Pop; electropop
- Length: 35:53
- Language: Italian; English
- Label: Universal Music Italy
- Producer: Francesco Catitti

Michele Bravi chronology
I Hate Music (2015)	Anime di carta (2017)	La geografia del buio (2021)

Singles from Anime di carta
- 1. "Il diario degli errori" Released: 9 February 2017

Anime di carta (Souls of Paper) is the second studio album by Italian singer Michele Bravi, released by Universal Music Italy on 24 February 2017. The album, produced by Francesco Catitti, features 13 songs, including two instrumental tracks and two English-language songs. Preceded by the single "Il diario degli errori", which placed fourth in the main section of the 67th Sanremo Music Festival, the album debuted at number one on the Italian FIMI Albums Chart.

== Background ==
In a press conference to launch Anime di carta, Bravi revealed he started writing the album in 2014, and that it was completed in December 2016. Bravi described it as a new beginning after a personal crisis, which followed his mediatic exposure resulting from winning the seventh series of Italian talent show X Factor, the commercial failure of his debut studio album, A passi piccoli, and being dubbed as a "dead artist" when he was dropped by Sony Music Italy. Anime di carta was his first full-length studio album released for Universal Music Italy, which had previously released Michele Bravi's extended play I Hate Music in 2015.

The album is focused on the end of a love story. According to Bravi, he personally met most of the authors contributing to the album, in order to tell them his story and to allow them to write songs he could recognize in. Bravi also contributed writing most of the songs featured in Anime di carta. Discussing the album title, Bravi explained that, while examining his trouble in relating with other people, he felt humans are like paper souls, because "paper is an accessible material, it is not valued, it is not precious, it's always at your fingertips. But you can write your story on it, and if you're made of paper, you can't tear it off of you, or you're gonna hurt yourself".

== Track listing ==
Standard edition
No.	Title	Writer(s)	Length
1.	"Come l'equilibrio (Intro)"	Michele Bravi; Francesco Catitti	0:29
2.	"Cambia"	Matteo De Simone; Riccardo Scirè; Bravi; Catitti	3:55
3.	"Diamanti"	Andrea Amati; Federica Abbate	3:26
4.	"Il diario degli errori"	Cheope; Abbate; Giuseppe Anastasi	3:26
5.	"Solo per un po'"	Davide Napoleone; Luca Serpenti	3:01
6.	"Due secondi (Cancellare tutto)"	Cheope; Luca Leoni; Abbate; Bravi	2:34
7.	"Andare via"	Bravi; Catitti; Alessandro Raina	2:32
8.	"Pausa"	Bravi; Raina; Catitti	3:20
9.	"Shiver"	Andreas Pfannenstill	3:23
10.	"Bones"	Patrick Jordan-Patrikios	2:33
11.	"Respiro"	Niccolò Contessa; Bravi; Catitti	3:15
12.	"Il punto in cui ti ho perso (Interludio)"	Bravi; Catitti	0:58
13.	"Chiavi di casa"	Bravi; Catitti; Antonio Dimartino	3:01
Total length:			35:53

== Charts ==
=== Weekly charts ===
Chart (2017)	Peak position
Italy (FIMI)	1

=== Year-end charts ===
Chart (2017)	Position
Italian Albums (FIMI)	39

== Certifications ==
Region	Certification	Certified units/sales
Italy (FIMI)	Gold	25,000^{*}
^{*} Sales figures based on certification alone.
