= Popolare (song) =

Single by Michele Bravi and Mida
- Released: 23 May 2025
- Genre: Pop; folk; urban
- Length: 2:25
- Label: Pastore Studio; M.A.S.T.; Believe Music
- Songwriters: Michele Bravi; Christian Prestato; Antonio Caputo
- Producers: Ava; Marramvsic

Michele Bravi singles chronology
"Lo ricordo io per te" (2025)	"Popolare" (2025)	"Prima o poi" (2026)

Mida singles chronology
"L'antidoto" (2025)	"Popolare" (2025)	"Bad Boys Don't Cry" (2025)

Music video
- "Popolare" on YouTube

"Popolare" is a song by Italian singer-songwriters Michele Bravi and Mida. It was released on 23 May 2025 by Pastore Studio, M.A.S.T. and Believe Music.

== Description ==
The song, written by both artists with Antonio Caputo, aka Kaput, is produced by Michele Bravi himself with Emanuele Cotto, aka Etta Matters or more simply Etta, and was born during Bravi's travels between Brazil and New Orleans, in particular during Mardi Gras, the last day of Carnival.

== Music video ==
The music video, directed by Dominga Lussone, for "Popolare" was released on the same day via Michele Bravi's YouTube channel and saw the participation of various faces from the world of music, entertainment and sport, including Priestess Miriam, Fiorella Mannoia, Enzo Miccio, Drusilla Foer, Gerry Scotti, Vittoria Ricci, Simona Ventura, Chiara Ferragni, Maria Grazia Cucinotta, Tommaso Cassissa, Simone Guidarelli, Valeria Angione, Pierluca Mariti, Adele Bonolis, Angelo Madonia, Karma B, Giulia Stabile, Ilenia Pastorelli, Tormento, Concita De Gregorio, Lillo, Giulia Salemi, Vanessa Incontrada, Benedetta Mazza, Federica Favara Scacco, La Zac, Debora Villa, Camilla Ghini, Gabibbo, Paolo Camilli, Kaput, Piero Piazzi, Giulia Penna, Luigi Giaretti, Carlotta Marioni, Giorgio Martelli, Francesco Cicconetti, Flavia Arditi, Cristina D'Avena, Emily Pallini, Massimo Lopez, Danilo Bertazzi, Veronica Angeloni, Filippo Bisciglia, Edoardo Prati, Nonna Luigina, Davide Moia, Etta, Carla Bruni, Eugenio in Via Di Gioia, Paolo Stella, Rossella Fiamingo, Cristiano Malgioglio and Carlo Conti.

== Charts ==
Weekly chart performance for "Popolare"
Chart (2025)	Peak position
Italy (FIMI)	83
Italy Airplay (EarOne)	43
