= Devastante =

Single by Olly and Juli

from the album Tutta vita
- Language: Italian
- Released: 8 March 2024
- Length: 3:10
- Label: Epic
- Songwriter: Federico Olivieri
- Composers: Julien Boverod; Luca Di Biasi
- Producer: Juli

Olly singles chronology
"A squarciagola" (2023)	"Devastante" (2024)	"Non credo più a niente" (2024)

Juli singles chronology
"A squarciagola" (2023)	"Devastante" (2023)	"Ho voglia di te" (2024)

Music video
- "Devastante" on YouTube

"Devastante" (transl. Devastating) is a 2024 song by Italian singer-songwriter Olly and record producer Juli. It was released by Epic on 8 March 2024 as the second single from his second studio album, Tutta vita.

The theme of the song reflects the idea of a love or attraction so powerful that it destabilizes the one who experiences it, with a mix of vulnerability and passion.

== Music video ==
A music video of "Devastante", directed by Amedeo Zancanella, was released on 8 March 2024 via Olly's YouTube channel.

== Charts ==
=== Weekly charts ===
Weekly chart performance for "Devastante"
Chart (2024)	Peak position
Italy (FIMI)	10

=== Year-end charts ===
Year-end chart performance for "Devastante"
Chart	Year	Position
Italy (FIMI)	2024	13
Italy (FIMI)	2025	11

== Certifications ==
Region	Certification	Certified units/sales
Italy (FIMI)	3× Platinum	300,000^{‡}
^{‡} Sales+streaming figures based on certification alone.
