= Michele Bravi =

Italian pop singer (born 1994)

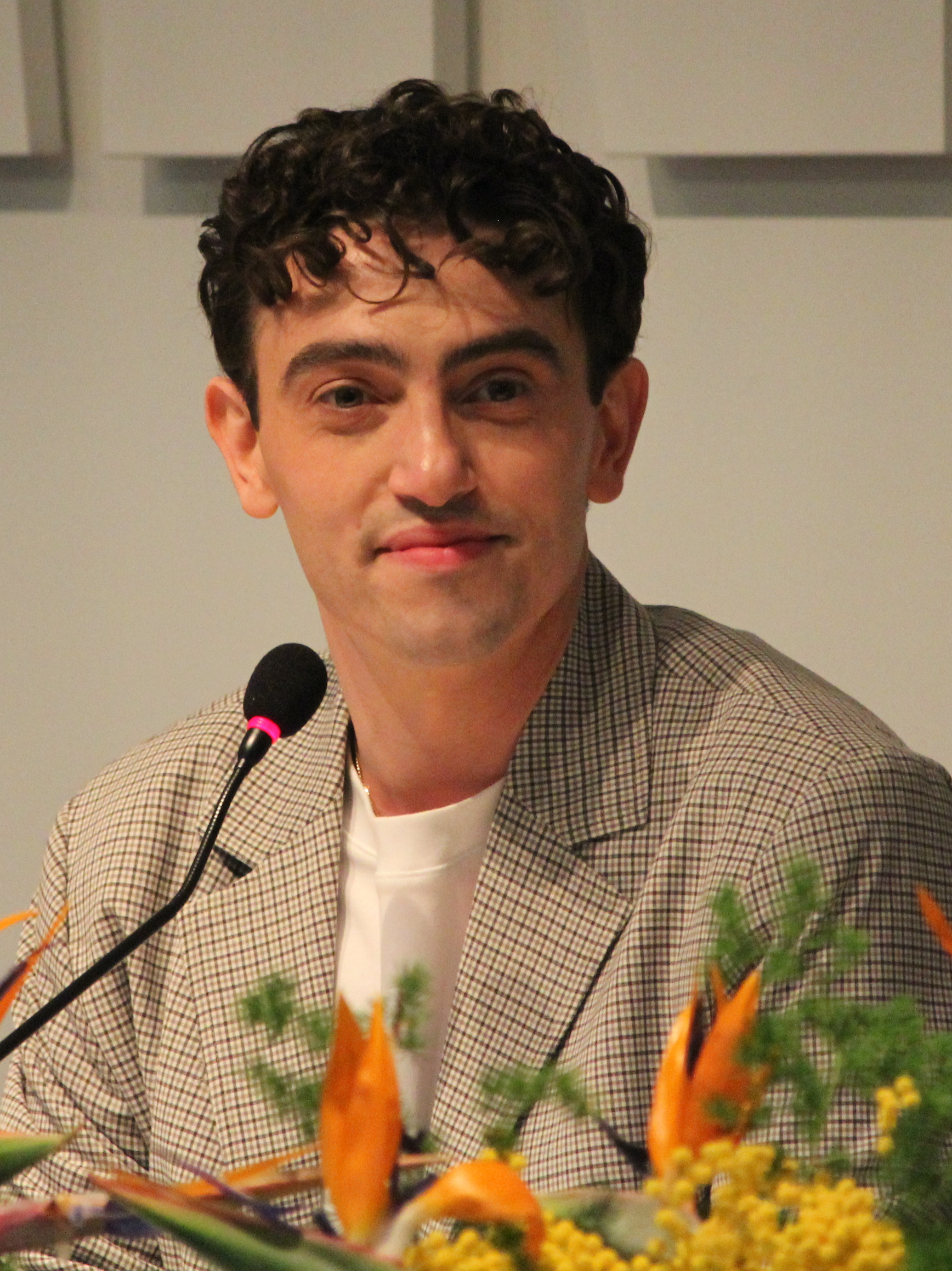
- Michele Bravi in February 2026

Background information
- Born: 19 December 1994 (age 31); Città di Castello, Perugia, Italy
- Genre: Pop
- Occupations: Singer; songwriter; actor
- Years active: 2013–present
- Labels: Sony Music (2013–2015); Universal Music (2015–)

Michele Bravi (Italian pronunciation: [miˈkɛːle ˈbraːvi]; born 19 December 1994) is an Italian singer, songwriter, and actor. He rose to fame after winning the seventh season of the Italian X Factor. His coronation song, "La vita e la felicità", was penned by Tiziano Ferro and reached the top spot of the Italian Singles Chart. Bravi's debut album, A passi piccoli, was released in June 2014.

In 2015, after parting ways with Sony Music, he released the EP I Hate Music, which entered the Italian Albums chart at number 3. In 2017, Bravi participated in the Sanremo Music Festival, with the song "Il diario degli errori", anticipation of his debut number one album Anime di carta. After acting on Italian TV series La compagnia del Cigno, he published his second number one album La geografia del buio in 2021 with the single "Mantieni il bacio".

Since his career debut Bravi has sold over 300,000 copies in Italy reaching the Top ten Charts six times, including two number one. He received two MTV Italian Music Awards, collaborated with numerous Italian artists, including Giorgia, Gué Pequeno, Federica Abbate, Elodie and Tiziano Ferro, and the British singers James Blunt and Sophie and the Giants.

== Career ==
Michele Bravi was born on 19 December 1994 in Città di Castello, a city in the province of Perugia, in Central Italy, to Giovanna Machi and Stefano Bravi. He has a sister, Marta, who is three years older than him. He started singing as a child, when he joined the city choir, but he later decided to quit. During his studies at the liceo classico, Bravi's interest in music persisted, even if it was just a hobby. He later started to take music lessons, and he learnt to play piano.

In 2013, Bravi auditioned for the seventh edition of the Italian talent show X Factor, performing Cat Stevens's "Father and Son". After being chosen by Morgan as a contestant for his category, "Boys Under 25", Bravi reached the final of the competition and, on 12 December 2013, won the competition, beating runner-up band Ape Escape. During the competition, Bravi performed the song "La vita e la felicità", co-written by Tiziano Ferro, which was later released as his debut single. During its second week, the single reached the top spot of the Italian Singles Chart. The song was also included in the extended play with the same title, released by Sony Music on 13 December 2013.

In February 2014, Bravi took part in the soundtrack of the film Sotto una buona stella, directed by Carlo Verdone, recording the song with the same title. "Sotto una buona stella" was also released as Bravi's second single. Bravi's first studio album, A passi piccoli, was released on 10 June 2014. The album, which includes tracks written by Giorgia, Tiziano Ferro, Emilio Munda, Federico Zampaglione and James Blunt, also spawned the singles "Un giorno in più" and "In bilico".

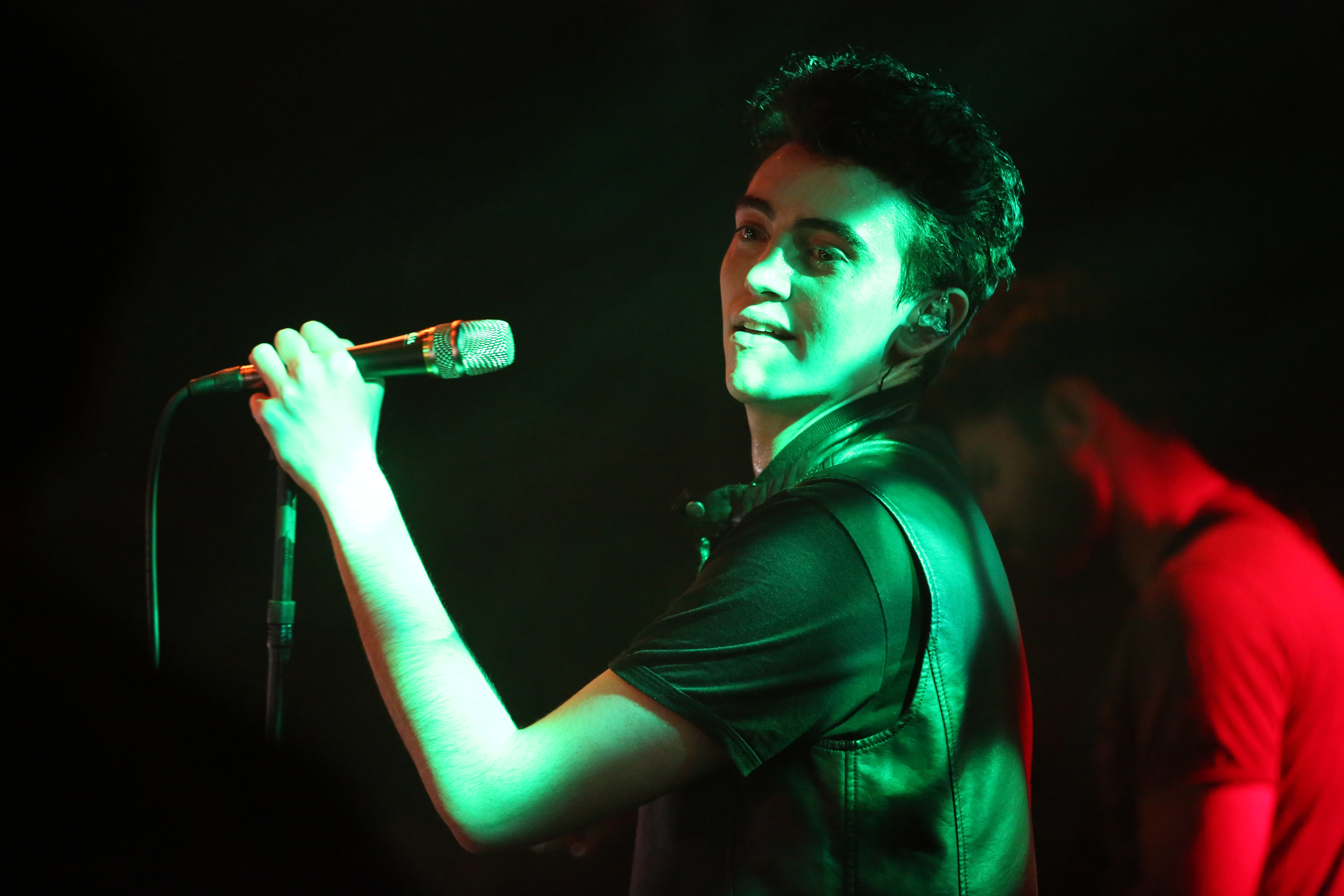
Bravi live in 2016

Having left Sony for Universal Music, Bravi in 2015 started a YouTube channel to attain a closer contact with his fans. During the year he started recording new songs and in October his EP I Hate Music was published. It was preceded by the single "The Days". All songs were co-written by Bravi and the lyrics are in English. The EP contains the Troye Sivan cover "The Fault in Our Stars", as well. In early 2016, the singer started his first concert tour.

In February 2017, Bravi competed in the "Big Artists" section of the 67th Sanremo Music Festival, performing the song "Il diario degli errori". The song was the lead single from Bravi's second studio album, Anime di carta, released on 24 February 2017. The album peaked the Italian Albums Chart and the song reached the number four of Italian Singles Chart receiving the double platinum certification. His second lead single from the album "Solo per un po'" won the Best Performance Award at the MTV Italian Music Awards.

From October 2017 to May 2017 he was cast with Annalisa and Giovanni Caccamo as tutors of seventeen season of Amici di Maria De Filippi. In 2018 the singer collaborated with Elodie and rapper Gué Pequeno on the Top ten hit "Nero Bali", which sold over 100,000 copies. In January 2019 he starred on Italian TV series "La compagnia del Cigno".

On 18 February 2020, he announced the future release of hid third studio album. In May 2020 he was cast for the spin-off Amici Speciali with his lead sing from the album le "La vita breve dei coriandoli". In January 2021, Bravi published the second single "Mantieni il bacio" and the album La geografia del buio. The album became his second number one on Italian Albums Chart, while the single was certified gold by Fimi. On June 22, 2021, the singer released the collaboration "Falene" with British band Sophie and the Giants.

On 30 November 2025, he was announced among the participants of the Sanremo Music Festival 2026. He competed with the song "Prima o poi".

== Personal life ==
In January 2017, interviewed by Vanity Fair, Bravi revealed he had a relationship with a man. The couple dated for two years before splitting. Bravi refused to label his sexuality in any way: "I don't need to come out, because there's no teen that would be surprised knowing I fell in love with a boy, and I think nobody of my same age would retreat feeling emotions for someone of the same sex". He also stated: "I met someone who gave me emotions, it's irrelevant he was a man. In the future, the same thing could happen with a girl".

In November 2018, Bravi allegedly caused a fatal car accident that left a 58-year-old motorcyclist dead.

== Discography ==
=== Albums ===
List of albums, with selected chart positions and certifications
Title	Album details	Peak chart positions	Certifications
Title	Album details	ITA	Certifications
A passi piccoli	Released: 10 June 2014; Label: Sony BMG; Formats: CD, download	8	
Anime di carta	Released: 24 February 2017; Label: Universal; Formats: CD, download, streaming	1	FIMI: Platinum
La geografia del buio	Released: 29 January 2021; Label: Universal; Formats: CD, download, streaming	1	FIMI: Gold
Tu cosa vedi quando chiudi gli occhi	Released: 12 April 2024; Label: Universal; Formats: CD, download, streaming	10	
Commedia musicale	Released: 17 April 2026; Label: M.A.S.T., Believe; Formats: CD, download, streaming	23	

=== EPs ===
List of extended plays, with selected chart positions and certifications
Title	Album details	Peak chart positions
Title	Album details	ITA
La vita e la felicità	Released: 6 December 2013; Label: Sony BMG; Formats: CD, download	23
I Hate Music	Released: 2 October 2015; Label: Universal; Formats: CD, download, streaming	3

=== Singles ===
List of singles, with chart positions and certifications, showing year released and album name
Single	Year	Peak chart positions	Certifications	Album or EP
Single	Year	ITA	Certifications	Album or EP
"La vita e la felicità"	2013	1	FIMI: Gold	La vita e la felicità
"Sotto una buona stella"	2014	37		A passi piccoli
"Un giorno in più"	2014	45		A passi piccoli
"In bilico"	2014	—		A passi piccoli
"The Days"	2015	—		I Hate Music
"Sweet Suicide"	2015	—		I Hate Music
"Il diario degli errori"	2017	4	FIMI: 2× Platinum	Anime di carta
"Solo per un po'"	2017	—	FIMI: Gold	Anime di carta
"Diamanti"	2017	—		Anime di carta
"Tanto per cominciare"	2017	88		Anime di carta
"Nero Bali" (with Elodie and Gué Pequeno)	2018	10	FIMI: 2× Platinum	This Is Elodie
"La vita breve dei coriandoli"	2020	39		La geografia del buio
"Mantieni il bacio"	2021	18	FIMI: Gold	La geografia del buio
"Falene" (with Sophie and the Giants)	2021	—	FIMI: Gold	La geografia del buio
"Cronaca di un tempo incerto"	2021	—		La geografia del buio
"Inverno dei fiori"	2022	14	FIMI: Gold	Non-album singles
"Zodiaco"	2022	—		Non-album singles
"Odio"	2023	—		Tu cosa vedi quando chiudi gli occhi
"Per me sei importante"	2023	—		Tu cosa vedi quando chiudi gli occhi
"Malumore francese" (featuring Carla Bruni)	2024	—		Tu cosa vedi quando chiudi gli occhi
"Umorismo italiano" (featuring Guè)	2024	—		Tu cosa vedi quando chiudi gli occhi
"Lo ricordo io per te"	2025	—		Non-album singles
"Popolare" (with Mida)	2025	83		Non-album singles
"Prima o poi"	2026	26		Non-album singles
"Domani è un altro giorno" (featuring Fiorella Mannoia)	2026	—		Non-album singles

=== Album appearances ===
List of other album appearances
Contribution	Year	Album
"The Christmas Song"	2014	X Factor Christmas 2014
"I Puffi sanno" (Cristina D'Avena featuring Michele Bravi)	2017	Duets – Tutti cantano Cristina
"Il mondo prima di te" (Annalisa featuring Michele Bravi)	2021	Nuda10

== Filmography ==
=== Film ===
Year	Title	Role(s)
2022	Amanda	Dude
2023	Finally Dawn	Singer en-travesti
2026	Roma Elastica	Rosso

=== Television ===
Year	Title	Role(s)	Notes
2013	X Factor	Contestant	Winner (season 7)
2017	Sanremo Music Festival 2017	Contestant	4th place with the song "Il diario degli errori"
2017–2018	Amici di Maria De Filippi	Music tutor	Talent show (season 17)
2018	Sanremo Music Festival 2018	Guest performer	Performing "Il mondo prima di te" with Annalisa in the duets night
2019	La Compagnia del Cigno	Giacomo	Recurring role; 3 episodes
2020	Amici Speciali	Contestant	All-star version of Amici di Maria De Filippi
2021	Sanremo Music Festival 2021	Guest performer	Performing "Quando" with Arisa in the duets night
2022	Sanremo Music Festival 2022	Contestant	10th place with the song "Inverno dei fiori"
2022	Monterossi	Manuel Macchi	Episodes: "Rage and Wind - Part I & II"
2023–2024	Amici di Maria De Filippi	Judge	Talent show (season 22-23, final stage only)
2026	Sanremo Music Festival 2026	Contestant	22nd place with the song "Prima o poi"

== Awards and nominations ==
Year	Award	Nomination	Work	Result
2014	MTV Italian Music Awards	Best Performance	"Un giorno in più"	Won
2016	MTV Italian Music Awards	Webstar	Himself	Nominated
2016	MTV Italian Music Awards	Nickelodeon SlimeFest Award	Himself	Nominated
2017	MTV Italian Music Awards	Best Italian Male	Himself	Nominated
2017	MTV Italian Music Awards	Best Performance	"Solo per un po'"	Won
2017	Wind Music Awards	Platinum Single Award	"Il Diario degli Errori"	Won

Awards and achievements
Preceded by Chiara	Italian X Factor; Winner; 2013	Succeeded by Lorenzo Fragola
