= Gira, il mondo gira =

Studio album by Olly and Juli
- Released: 10 February 2023
- Genre: Pop
- Length: 48:02
- Label: Epic
- Producer: Juli

Olly and Juli chronology
Gira, il mondo gira (2023)	Tutta vita (2024)

Singles from Gira, il mondo gira
- 1. "Polvere" Released: 8 February 2023; 2. "La notte vola (RMX)" Released: 16 March 2023; 3. "Tutto con te" Released: 9 June 2023

Gira, il mondo gira is the debut studio album by Italian singer-songwriter Olly and Italian record producer Juli, released on 10 February 2023 through Epic Records.

The album included the song "Polvere", which competed in the Sanremo Music Festival 2023. Gira, il mondo gira peaked at number 13 on the Italian Albums Chart and was certified double platinum by the Federazione Industria Musicale Italiana.

== Track listing ==
Gira, il mondo gira track listing
No.	Title	Writer(s)	Producer(s)	Length
1.	"Una vita"	Federico Olivieri; Julien Boverod	Juli	2:45
2.	"L'anima balla"	Olivieri; Boverod	Juli	2:36
3.	"Ho un amico"	Olivieri; Boverod; Pierfrancesco Pasini	Juli	2:48
4.	"Polvere"	Olivieri; Emanuele Lovito; Boverod	Juli	2:46
5.	"Meno male che c'è il mare"	Olivieri; Boverod	Juli	2:53
6.	"Un'altra volta"	Olivieri; Boverod	Juli	2:05
7.	"L'amore va"	Olivieri; Boverod; Luca Faraone	Juli	2:30
8.	"Tutto male"	Olivieri; Boverod	Juli	3:24
9.	"Bianca"	Olivieri; Boverod	Juli	2:36
10.	"Fammi morire"	Olivieri; Boverod	Juli	2:08
11.	"Canto alla luna"	Olivieri; Boverod	Juli	2:47
12.	"Tutto con te"	Olivieri; Boverod	Juli	2:38
13.	"La notte vola (RMX)" (with Lorella Cuccarini)	Silvio Capitta; Marco Salvati; Giuseppe Vessicchio; Olivieri; Boverod	Juli	2:22
14.	"Polvere (live)"	Olivieri; Lovito; Boverod	Juli	3:13
15.	"Bianca (live)"	Olivieri; Boverod	Juli	2:32
16.	"L'anima balla (live)"	Olivieri; Boverod	Juli	3:34
17.	"Meno male che c'è il mare (live)"	Olivieri; Boverod	Juli	4:25

== Charts ==
=== Weekly charts ===
Chart (2023)	Peak position
Italian Albums (FIMI)	13

=== Year-end charts ===
Chart	Year	Position
Italian Albums (FIMI)	2023	86

== Certifications ==
Region	Certification	Certified units/sales
Italy (FIMI)	2× Platinum	100,000^{‡}
^{‡} Sales+streaming figures based on certification alone.
