= Depresso fortunato =

Single by Olly and Juli

from the album Tutta vita
- Language: Italian
- Released: 23 May 2025
- Genre: Folk pop
- Length: 3:32
- Label: Epic
- Songwriter: Federico Olivieri
- Composer: Julien Boverod
- Producer: Juli

Olly singles chronology
"Balorda nostalgia" (2025)	"Depresso fortunato" (2025)	"Questa domenica" (2025)

Juli singles chronology
"Balorda nostalgia" (2025)	"Depresso fortunato" (2025)	"Questa domenica" (2025)

Music video
- "Depresso fortunato" on YouTube

"Depresso fortunato" (transl. Lucky depressed) is a song by Italian singer-songwriter Olly and record producer by Juli. It was released by Epic on 23 May 2025 and included in the digital re-release from the second studio album, Tutta vita.

== Music video ==
A music video of "Depresso fortunato", directed by Samuele Giunta, was released on 5 June 2025 via Olly's YouTube channel.

== Live performances ==
The track debuted live in Genoa on 4 May 2025 and was performed again a few days later in Bologna.

== Charts ==
=== Weekly charts ===
Weekly chart performance for "Depresso fortunato"
Chart (2025)	Peak position
Italy (FIMI)	8
Italy Airplay (EarOne)	28

=== Year-end charts ===
Year-end chart performance for "Depresso fortunato"
Chart (2025)	Position
Italy (FIMI)	43

== Certifications ==
Region	Certification	Certified units/sales
Italy (FIMI)	Gold	100,000^{‡}
^{‡} Sales+streaming figures based on certification alone.
