= La mia banda suona il pop =

2020 Italian comedy film

- Film poster
- Directed by: Fausto Brizzi
- Written by: Fausto Brizzi; Marco Martani; Edoardo Falcone; Alessandro Bardani
- Produced by: Luca Barbareschi
- Starring: Christian De Sica; Massimo Ghini; Angela Finocchiaro; Paolo Rossi; Diego Abatantuono
- Cinematography: Gino Sgreva
- Edited by: Luciana Pandolfelli
- Music by: Bruno Zambrini
- Distributed by: Medusa Film
- Release date: 20 February 2020
- Running time: 95 minutes
- Country: Italy
- Language: Italian
- Box office: $389,470

La mia banda suona il pop (lit. 'My band plays pop music') is a 2020 Italian musical comedy film directed by Fausto Brizzi.

== Cast ==
- Christian De Sica as Tony
- Massimo Ghini as Lucky
- Angela Finocchiaro as Micky
- Paolo Rossi as Jerry
- Diego Abatantuono as Franco Masiero
- Natasha Stefanenko as Olga
- Rinat Khismatouline as Vladimir Ivanov
- Giulio Base as the doctor
- Tiberio Timperi as himself
