= Questa domenica =

Single by Olly and Juli

from the album Tutta vita
- Language: Italian
- Released: 29 August 2025
- Genre: Power ballad
- Length: 3:36
- Label: Epic
- Songwriter: Federico Olivieri
- Composers: Julien Boverod; Pierfrancesco Pasini
- Producer: Juli

Olly singles chronology
"Depresso fortunato" (2025)	"Questa domenica" (2025)

Juli singles chronology
"Depresso fortunato" (2025)	"Questa domenica" (2025)	"Brutta storia" (2025)

Music video
- "Questa domenica" on YouTube

"Questa domenica" (transl. This Sunday) is a song by Italian singer-songwriter Olly and record producer Juli. It was released by Epic on 29 August 2025 and included in the digital re-release from the second studio album, Tutta vita.

The song topped the Italian singles chart.

== Description ==
The song, a power ballad between melancholy and romanticism with an 80s atmosphere, was written by the singer-songwriter himself and produced by Julien Boverod, aka Juli. It also anticipated the release of the deluxe edition of the album Tutta vita, entitled Tutta vita (sempre), due out on 26 September 2025.

== Promotion ==
The release of the song was surprisingly revealed by the singer-songwriter himself on 25 August 2025 through his social media profiles and preceded the sold-out concerts on 2 and 4 September at the Snai San Siro Hippodrome in Milan, entitled Grande festa.

== Music video ==
A music video of "Questa domenica", directed by Giulio Rosati, was released on the same day via Olly's YouTube channel and saw the participation of the Italian actor Giorgio Careccia.

== Charts ==
=== Weekly charts ===
Weekly chart performance for "Questa domenica"
Chart (2025)	Peak position
Italy (FIMI)	1
Italy Airplay (EarOne)	2

=== Year-end charts ===
Year-end chart performance for "Questa domenica"
Chart (2025)	Position
Italy (FIMI)	31

== Certifications ==
Region	Certification	Certified units/sales
Italy (FIMI)	2× Platinum	400,000^{‡}
^{‡} Sales+streaming figures based on certification alone.
