= Quei ricordi là =

Single by Olly and Juli

from the album Tutta vita
- Released: 6 December 2024
- Genre: Pop rap
- Length: 3:00
- Label: Epic
- Songwriter: Federico Olivieri
- Composers: Federico Olivieri; Julien Boverod
- Producer: Juli

Olly singles chronology
| "Per due come noi" (2024) | "Quei ricordi là" (2024) | "Balorda nostalgia" (2025) |

Juli singles chronology
| "Per due come noi" (2024) | "Quei ricordi là" (2024) | "Balorda nostalgia" (2025) |

Music video
- "Quei ricordi là" on YouTube

"Quei ricordi là" (transl. Those memories there) is a song by Italian singer-songwriter Olly and record producer Juli. It was released on 6 December 2024 by Epic as the fourth single from the second studio album, Tutta vita.

== Description ==
The song, written by the singer-songwriter himself, was produced by Julien Boverod, aka Juli. The fourth track from the album Tutta vita, the song was made available for radio rotation on 6 December 2024.

== Music video ==
A visual video of "Quei ricordi là", directed by Giulio Rosati, was released on 25 October 2024 via Olly's YouTube channel.

== Charts ==
=== Weekly charts ===
Weekly chart performance for "Quei ricordi là"
| Chart (2024) | Peak position |
|---|---|
| Italy (FIMI) | 15 |
| Italy Airplay (EarOne) | 34 |

=== Year-end charts ===
Year-end chart performance for "Quei ricordi là"
| Chart (2025) | Position |
|---|---|
| Italy (FIMI) | 39 |

== Certifications ==
| Region | Certification | Certified units/sales |
|---|---|---|
| Italy (FIMI) | Platinum | 200,000^{‡} |
^{‡} Sales+streaming figures based on certification alone.
