= Per due come noi =

Single by Olly, Angelina Mango and Juli

from the album Tutta vita
- Released: 6 September 2024
- Genre: Power ballad
- Length: 3:32
- Label: Sony; Epic; LaTarma
- Songwriters: Federico Olivieri; Angelina Mango; Julien Boverod
- Producer: Juli

Olly singles chronology
"Ho voglia di te" (2024)	"Per due come noi" (2024)	"Quei ricordi là" (2024)

Angelina Mango singles chronology
"Melodrama" (2024)	"Per due come noi" (2024)	"Velo sugli occhi" (2025)

Juli singles chronology
"Ho voglia di te" (2024)	"Per due come noi" (2024)	"Quei ricordi là" (2024)

Music video
- "Per due come noi" on YouTube

"Per due come noi" (transl. For two like us) is a song by Italian singers Olly and Angelina Mango and Italian record producer Juli. It was released on 6 September 2024 as the third single from Olly and Juli's second studio album, Tutta vita.

The song topped the Italian Singles Chart.

== Description ==
The song was written by both singer-songwriters, who also collaborated on the composition with Julien Boverod, aka Juli, who also took care of the production. It tells the story of a complicated relationship, which characterizes everyday life.

== Promotion ==
The song was previewed by both singer-songwriters on 4 September 2024 at the Verona Arena during Future Hits Live.

== Music video ==
The music video for "Per due come noi", directed by Simone Peluso, was released on the same day via Olly's YouTube channel.

== Charts ==
=== Weekly charts ===
Weekly chart performance for "Per due come noi"
Chart (2024)	Peak position
Italy (FIMI)	1
Italy Airplay (EarOne)	1

=== Year-end charts ===
Year-end chart performance for "Per due come noi"
Chart	Year	Position
Italy (FIMI)	2024	24
Italy (FIMI)	2025	6

== Certifications ==
Region	Certification	Certified units/sales
Italy (FIMI)	3× Platinum	600,000^{‡}
^{‡} Sales+streaming figures based on certification alone.
