= Lorella Cuccarini =

Italian actress, singer and dancer

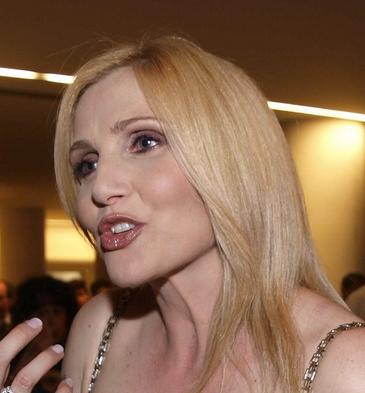
- Cuccarini in June 2008
- Born: Lorella Cuccarini Persili; August 10, 1965 (age 61); Rome, Italy
- Occupations: Singer; actress; dancer; television presenter

Lorella Cuccarini Persili (born August 10, 1965) is an Italian singer, actress, dancer, and television presenter.

== Life and career ==
Cuccarini was born in Rome. At nine years old, she started to attend the dance school of Enzo Paolo Turchi (choreographer and husband of Carmen Russo).

=== 1982–1985: Television debut with Fantastico and dancing career ===
After some experiences as a chorus girl, Lorella Cuccarini made her television debut at nineteen years old as a member of the dance crew on Te lo do io il Brasile, which aired on Rete 4. She later gained national recognition in the variety show Fantastico, hosted by Pippo Baudo, in which Cuccarini served as a dancer and performer during the sketches. In the same years she also worked as a dancer on other successful Italian variety and games shows such as Il tastomatto and Sponsor City.

=== 1986–1990: Music breakthrough with Lorel and successful singles ===
In 1986, Lorella Cuccarini released her debut studio album Lorel under Polydor Records. A pop and italo disco album, the record was promoted by the smash-hits "Sugar Sugar", "Kangarù" and "Tutto matto", which debuted on top-ten on the Italian singles charts and were promoted during some Fantastico performances. In 1987, the singer won the Premio Regia Televisiva as the "Female personality of the Year" and opened the German leg of Adriano Celentano's I miei americani... 2 Tour. From September 1987 to January 1988, Cuccarini co-hosted Festival, a variety show created by Pippo Baudo which aired on Canale 5. She also served as a co-host in other shows including Odiens, Ciak 88 and Vota la voce. In 1989, Lorella Cuccarini made her music comeback with the single "La notte vola", which reached number 4 on the Italian singles charts and was certified platinum by FIMI. To date "La notte vola" is considered Cuccarini's signature song, with many artists taking inspiration and paying homage to it. The song was also re-recorded in English and Spanish language and entered the charts in Germany and Spain.

=== 1991–1994: the album Voci and career as a presenter ===
From 1990 to 2001, Cuccarini hosted the sketch comedy show Paperissima alongside Marco Columbro and Ezio Greggio. She presented it for seven non-consecutive seasons being replaced by Marisa Laurito for the 1993 edition. In 1992, the singer made her acting debut on Piazza di Spagna, a Canale 5 comedy-drama miniseries in which she was cast as the titular character. She also hosted Buona Domenica, a Sunday entertainment program for two seasons with Marco Columbro on Canale 5. In 1993, Cuccarini was chosen as the co-host of the Sanremo Music Festival 1993, presented by Pippo Baudo. For her performance at the Sanremo festival, she won her second Premio Regia Televisiva as the "Female personality of the Year". In the same year, the singer-turned-presenter released her second studio album Voci, promoted by its lead single "Liberi liberi", presented during a Buona Domenica special.

=== 1995–1996: First Sanremo festival as a contestant ad the album Voglia di fare ===
In 1995, Lorella Cuccarini was announced as one of the contestants of the Sanremo Music Festival 1995. The singer competed with the song "Un altro amore no" and placed tenth in the final night's rank. The song was later released as the lead single from Cuccarini's third studio album Voglia di fare. This marks Cuccarini's final solo studio release: since the following year she will focus on television hosting activities.

=== 1997–2004: Theatre debut and continued hosting ===
In 1997, Lorella Cuccarini was cast as Sandy in the first Italian adaptation of the musical Grease. Cuccarini's performance was well received by the critics and audience. In the same year, the soundtrack album Grease - Il musical was released by Triangle Productions with Cuccarini singing the Italian version of the original songs. In 1998, Cuccarini made a cameo appearance in Jonathan Frakes's Star Trek: Insurrection. Originally, the role offered to her was pretty much bigger but was later cut in a smaller appearance. In 1999, the singer presented the dance-based talent show Campioni di ballo, which aired on Canale 5. From 2000 to 2003, Cuccarini hosted a variety of Canale 5 shows such as La notte vola, Uno di noi and Scommettiamo che…?. In 2003, she attended as a member of the jury during the Sanremo Music Festival 2003 and hosted the annual ceremony of the David di Donatello. The following year she was cast as Giovanna in the Rai 2 drama series Amiche alongside Barbara De Rossi and Claudia Koll.

=== 2005–2010: Acting and standalone performances ===
From 2005 to 2007, Lorella Cuccarini took the role of Charity in Charity: The Musical with Cesare Bocci as the co-lead protagonist. The following year she was cast as Francesca in the second season of Lo zio d'America, a Rai 1 comedy series starring Christian De Sica. For the following years, Cuccarini did not take the hosting role for any Rai or Mediaset program due to poor ratings of her previous shows. In 2008, however, she hosted the TV Sorrisi e Canzoni gala at the Roma Fiction Fest. In 2009, Lorella Cuccarini voiced Lissi in the German animated film Lissi und der wilde Kaiser and returned to television hosting with the revival-variety program È nata una stella gemella. In 2010, Cuccarini made a standalone performance during the Sanremo Music Festival 2010, with choreographies by Luca Tommassini. The performance was viewed by 16 millions of televiewers and served as an inspiration for the Beyoncé's Billboard Music Awards performance.

=== 2011–2015: Television activities and Rapunzel: The Musical ===
From 2010 to 2013, Lorella Cuccarini hosted the Sunday-special talk show Domenica in, alongside Massimo Giletti and Sonia Grey. In 2011, Cuccarini serves as a judge on Star Academy, a music talent show based on the Spanish reality of the same name. In the same year, she was honored as Commendatore della Repubblica. In 2012, Lorella Cuccarini made her radio debut, hosting her first radio talk show Citofonare Cuccarini on Rai Radio 1. In the same year she was also judge during the annual beauty contest Miss Italia. From 2014 to 2016 she returned to stage acting playing Mother Gothel, the main antagonist, in Rapunzel: The Musical. The show ran at Teatro Brancaccio in Rome for the 2014–2015 season, receiving widespread acclaim. For the 2015–2016 season the show embarked a national tour. In 2015, Lorella Cuccarini appeared as a guest judge during the final stage of Amici di Maria De Filippi and was announced as one of the regular judges of Forte forte forte, a talent show created by Raffaella Carrà. However, her involvement was later scrapped and Cuccarini was replaced with Asia Argento.

=== 2016–2019: Nemicamatissima ===
From October to November 2015, Lorella Cuccarini served as a judge on the singing competition Ti lascio una canzone, hosted by Antonella Clerici. In 2016, Cuccarini hosted and produced the two-night variety event Nemicamatissima, alongside her Fantastico co-star Heather Parisi. The show was intended as a revival of the 80s and 90s Italian variety shows in which both Cuccarini and Parisi performed. For the program, Cuccarini recorded a soundtrack album of the same that was released in January 2017 and promoted by the single "Tanto tempo ancora", with featured vocals by Parisi. In 2018, Lorella Cuccarini became a Conad ambassador and testimonial, and returned to television acting in the second season of the Canale 5 drama series L'isola di Pietro. In 2019, she hosted La vita in diretta, a daily talk show with Alberto Matano. Cuccarini took the role for one season only being removed the following year due to conflicts with her co-host Matano.

=== 2020–present: Amici di Maria De Filippi and music comeback ===
In 2020, Lorella Cuccarini was announced as one of the new dance teachers of the twentieth season of Amici di Maria De Filippi. She took that role for the 2020–2021 season and switched the following year as a teacher in the singing category. During the program, Cuccarini followed the personal and artistic progression of a variety of aspiring artists such as dancer Alessandro Cavallo and singers Alex Wyse, Angelina Mango and Sarah Toscano. In 2021, Lorella Cuccarini collaborated with the Italian EDM group Il Pagante for the Christmas single "Un pacco per te", which entered the Italian singles charts at number 81. In 2022, Cuccarini guest hosted Striscia la notizia for a 4-episodes-arc alongside Gerry Scotti and reprised her role as Mother Gothel in the revival show of Rapunzel: The Musical. In 2023, Lorella Cuccarini was announced as one of the guest artist of the duets night at the Sanremo Music Festival 2023. Cuccarini performed a remixed version of her 1989 smash hit "La notte vola" with Olly. The duet remix was later recorded in studio and released as the fifth single from Olly's debut studio album Gira, il mondo gira. In 2024, Lorella Cuccarini returned as a co-host during the fourth night at Sanremo Music Festival 2024, presented by Amadeus.

== Personal life and family ==
Cuccarini married the composer Silvio Testi in 1991. They have four children.

Her father, Vero Cuccarini, has been repeatedly convicted of usury. In January 2019 she openly spoke in favour of the anti-refugee policies of Matteo Salvini, leader of Lega Nord. Meanwhile, she also expressed opinions against the appeals for reception of Pope Francis.

== Discography ==
=== Studio albums ===
List of albums, with release date and certifications
Title	Album details	Certifications
Lorel	Released: 1986; Label: Polydor Records; Format: CD, LP	
Voci	Released: 1993; Label: RTI Music; Format: CD, LP, cassette	FIMI: Platinum
Voglia di fare	Released: 1995; Label: RTI Music; Format: CD, LP, cassette	

=== Compilation albums ===
List of compilation albums, with release date and certifications
Title	Album details	Certifications
Heather e Lorella (with Heather Parisi)	Released: 1988; Label: Polydor Records; Format: CD, LP, cassette	
Nemicamatissima	Released: March 31, 2017; Label: Warner Music Italy; Format: CD, LP, digital download cassette	

=== Singles ===
List of singles, with selected chart positions and certifications
Title	Year	Peak chart positions	Certifications	Album
Title	Year	ITA	Certifications	Album
"Sugar Sugar/ La rete d'oro"	1985	5		Lorel
"Tutto matto/ Sandy"	1986	6	FIMI: Gold	Lorel
"Kangarù/ Accendimi il cuore"	1986	—		Lorel
"L'amore è/ Chi è di scena" (featuring Alessandra Martines)	1986	12		Lorel
"Io ballerò/ Se ti va di cantare"	1987	3	FIMI: Gold	Non-album single
"La notte vola"	1989	7	FIMI: Platinum	Non-album single
"Lullabye Mix"	1989	—		Non-album single
"Magic (Mix Version)"	1989	—		Non-album single
"Per te Armenia/ Sono caduti" (featuring Vittorio Gassman)	1989	—		Non-album single
"Ascolta il cuore"	1991	—		Non-album single
"Oh signorina/ Tarzan" (featuring Francesco Salvi and Marco Columbro)	1991	17		Se lo sapevo
"Liberi liberi"	1992	—		Voci
"Un altro amore no"	1995	—		Voglia di fare
"Uno di noi" (featuring Gianni Morandi)	2002	31		Non-album single
"Un'onda d'amore"	2008	—		Non-album single
"Il mio viaggio"	2010	—		Non-album single
"Tanto tempo ancora" (featuring Heather Parisi)	2016	—		Nemicamatissima
"Un pacco per te" (with Il Pagante)	2021	81		Devastante
"La notte vola RMX" (with Olly)	2023	—	FIMI: Gold	Gira, il mondo gira
"Cha-Cha Twist" (with Riccardo Marcuzzo)	2025	—		Casabase

=== Other appearances ===
List of non-singles guest appearances, with release year and other artists
Title	Year	Other artist(s)	Album
"This Is the Time" (cover)	1990	None	Sentieri d'amore
"Voci"	1992	None	Buona Domenica
"Tu come me/ Tu como yo"	1993	None	Micaela
"Parola a chi"	1995	None	La stangata
"Portami via"	1995	Luca Jurman	Non-album song
"Mi mancherai"	1995	None	Il disprezzo
"X Te"	1996	None	Buona Domenica
"Ran can can"	1999	None	Campioni di ballo
"Guarda la realtà"	2017	None	My Little Pony: The Movie
"Magica Doremì"	2022	Cristina D'Avena	40 - Il sogno continua

== Filmography ==
=== As an actress ===
Year	Title	Role	Notes
1990	Guiding Light	Herself	Soap opera, cameo
1992	Piazza di Spagna	Annabella Morganti	Miniseries
1998	Star Trek: Insurrection	Starfleet Crewman	Uncredited
2004	Amiche	Giovanna Marchi	Miniseries
2006	Lo zio d'America	Francesca	Main role (season 2)
2007	Lissi und der wilde Kaiser	Lissi (voice)	Italian dub
2012	L'amore è sordo	Director Lorella	Television film
2017	My Little Pony: The Movie	Tempest Shadow (voice)	Italian dub
2018	L'isola di Pietro	Isabella Sulci	Recurring role
2024	No Activity	Committee Chair	Episode: "Notte numero 17"

=== Other appearances ===
Year	Title	Role	Notes
1984	Te lo do io il Brasile	Herself/ Background dancer	Variety show
1985	Il tastomatto	Herself/ Background dancer	Variety show
1985–1987	Fantastico	Herself/ Various	Variety show (seasons 6–7)
1987–1988	Festival	Herself/co-host	Variety show
1988–1989	Odiens	Herself/co-host	Sketch comedy show
1989, 1995, 2000	Vota la voce	Herself/co-host	Competition show (seasons 17, 23, 28)
1990–2004	Paperissima	Herself/co-host	Variety show (seasons 1–2, 4–7)
1991	Bellezze sulla neve	Herself/co-host	Game show (season 1)
1991–1996	Buona domenica	Herself/host	Variety show (seasons 4–5, 8)
1993	Sanremo Music Festival 1993	Herself/co-host	Annual music festival
1995	Sanremo Music Festival 1995	Herself/ contestant	Annual music festival
1995	La stangata: Chi la fa l'aspetti	Herself/host	Prank variety show
1996; 1999	Campioni di ballo	Herself/host	Competition dance show (seasons 1 and 4)
1998	A tutta festa	Herself/co-host	Variety show
2001	La notte vola	Herself/host	Musical show
2001	Stelle a quattro zampe	Herself/host	Animal competition show
2002–2003	Uno di noi	Herself/co-host	Variety show
2008	La sai l'ultima?	Herself/host	Variety show (season 10)
2010–2011	Domenica in	Herself/co-host	Talk show (season 35)
2011	Un amico è così	Herself/host	Reality competition show
2011	Star Academy	Herself/ Judge	Competition dance show
2012	Miss Italia 2012	Herself/ Judge	Annual beauty contest
2014	La pista	Herself/ Judge	Competition dance show
2015	Ti lascio una canzone	Herself/ Judge	Musical talent show
2016	Nemicamatissima	Herself/co-host	Variety show
2019–2020	La vita in diretta	Herself/co-host	Talk show (season 30)
2020–present	Amici di Maria De Filippi	Herself/dance teacher	Talent show (season 20 and 26)
2020–present	Amici di Maria De Filippi	Herself/singing teacher	Talent show (season 21–25)
2022	Striscia la notizia	Herself/guest host	Variety show (season 34)
2023	Sanremo Music Festival 2023	Herself/guest	Guest performer for the 4th night
2024	Sanremo Music Festival 2024	Herself/co-host	Co-host for the 4th night
2024	This Is Me	Herself/regular guest	Amici di Maria de Filippi spin-off

== Stage ==
Year	Title	Role
1997–1999	Grease	Sandy Dobrowski
2005–2007	Sweet Charity	Charity
2010	Il pianeta proibito: The Rock Musical	Miranda
2014–2016; 2022–2023	Rapunzel: The Musical	Mother Gothel
2017–2019	Non mi hai più detto ti amo	Serena
2024–present	Aggiungi un posto a tavola	Consolazione
