= Polvere (Olly song) =

Single by Olly

from the album Gira, il mondo gira
- Language: Italian
- Released: 8 February 2023
- Length: 2:46
- Label: Epic
- Composers: Federico Olivieri; Emanuele Lovito; Julien Boverod
- Lyricists: Federico Olivieri; Emanuele Lovito
- Producer: Juli

Olly singles chronology
"L'anima bella" (2022)	"Polvere" (2023)	"La notte vola RMX" (2023)

Music video
- "Polvere" on YouTube

"Polvere" (transl. Dust) is a song co-written and recorded by Italian singer Olly. It was released by Epic Records on 8 February 2023 as the lead single from his debut studio album Gira, il mondo gira.

The song was written by Olly with co-writing contribution by Emanuele Lovito and produced by Juli. It competed in the Sanremo Music Festival 2023, ranking 24th in the overall results.

== Music video ==
A music video of "Polvere", directed by Nicola Bussei and Asia J. Lanni, was released on 8 February 2023 via Olly's YouTube channel.

== Charts ==
Chart performance for "Polvere"
Chart (2023)	Peak position
Italy (FIMI)	14
Italy Airplay (EarOne)	58

== Certifications ==
Region	Certification	Certified units/sales
Italy (FIMI)	Platinum	100,000^{‡}
^{‡} Sales+streaming figures based on certification alone.
