= Tutta vita =

Studio album by Olly and Juli
- Released: 25 October 2024
- Genre: Pop
- Length: 38:10
- Label: Epic
- Producer: Juli

Olly and Juli chronology
Gira, il mondo gira (2023)	Tutta vita (2024)

Singles from Tutta vita
- 1. "A squarciagola" Released: 3 November 2023; 2. "Devastante" Released: 8 March 2024; 3. "Per due come noi" Released: 6 September 2024; 4. "Quei ricordi là" Released: 6 December 2024; 5. "Balorda nostalgia" Released: 12 February 2025; 6. "Depresso fortunato" Released: 23 May 2025; 7. "Questa domenica" Released: 29 August 2025

Tutta vita is the second studio album by Italian singer-songwriter Olly and Italian record producer Juli, released on 25 October 2024 through Epic.

The album was preceded by the singles "A squarciagola", "Devastante", and "Per due come noi", the latter a duet with Angelina Mango. In 2025, the album was reissued including the song "Balorda nostalgia", which won the 75th Sanremo Music Festival. Tutta vita topped the Italian Albums Chart and was certified diamond by the Federazione Industria Musicale Italiana.

An expanded reissue, Tutta vita (sempre), was released on 26 September 2025.

== Track listing ==
Tutta vita track listing
No.	Title	Writer(s)	Producer(s)	Length
1.	"È festa"	Federico Olivieri; Julien Boverod	Juli	2:49
2.	"I cantieri del Giappone"	Olivieri; Boverod	Juli	3:04
3.	"Per due come noi" (with Angelina Mango)	Olivieri; Angelina Mango; Boverod	Juli	3:32
4.	"Quei ricordi là"	Olivieri; Boverod	Juli	3:00
5.	"Noi che"	Olivieri; Boverod	Juli	3:21
6.	"Devastante"	Olivieri; Boverod; Luca Di Blasi	Juli	3:10
7.	"A noi non serve far l'amore"	Olivieri; Boverod; Pierfrancesco Pasini	Juli	3:27
8.	"Sopra la stessa barca" (with Enrico Nigiotti)	Olivieri; Enrico Nigiotti; Boverod	Juli	2:51
9.	"La lavatrice si è rotta"	Olivieri; Boverod	Juli	2:51
10.	"Scarabocchi"	Olivieri; Boverod	Juli	3:00
11.	"A squarciagola"	Olivieri; Boverod	Juli	3:04
12.	"Il campione"	Olivieri; Boverod	Juli	4:01

Tutta vita (sempre) track listing
No.	Title	Writer(s)	Producer(s)	Length
1.	"Così così"	Olivieri; Boverod	Juli	3:19
2.	"Questa domenica"	Olivieri; Boverod; Pasini	Juli	3:36
3.	"Il brivido della vita"	Olivieri; Boverod	Juli	3:06
4.	"Depresso fortunato"	Olivieri; Boverod	Juli	3:32
5.	"Come noi non c'è nessuno"	Olivieri; Boverod	Juli	4:12
6.	"Balorda nostalgia"	Olivieri; Boverod; Pasini	Juli	3:17
7.	"Occhi color mare"	Olivieri; Boverod	Juli	3:15
8.	"Buon trasloco"	Olivieri; Boverod	Juli	4:20

== Charts ==
=== Weekly charts ===
Chart (2024–25)	Peak position
Italian Albums (FIMI)	1
Swiss Albums (Schweizer Hitparade)	40

=== Year-end charts ===
Chart	Year	Position
Italian Albums (FIMI)	2024	28
Italian Albums (FIMI)	2025	1

== Certifications ==
Region	Certification	Certified units/sales
Italy (FIMI)	Diamond	500,000^{‡}
^{‡} Sales+streaming figures based on certification alone.
