= Balorda nostalgia =

Single by Olly and Juli

from the album Tutta vita
- Language: Italian
- Released: 12 February 2025
- Genre: Pop; power ballad
- Length: 3:17
- Label: Epic
- Composers: Olly; Juli; Pierfrancesco Pasini
- Lyricist: Olly
- Producer: Juli

Olly singles chronology
"Quei ricordi là" (2024)	"Balorda nostalgia" (2025)	"Depresso fortunato" (2025)

Juli singles chronology
"Quei ricordi là" (2024)	"Balorda nostalgia" (2025)	"Depresso fortunato" (2025)

Music video
- "Balorda nostalgia" on YouTube

"Balorda nostalgia" (Italian pronunciation: [baˈlorda nostalˈdʒiːa]; "Foolish Nostalgia") is a 2025 song by Italian singer-songwriter Olly and record producer Juli. Released by Epic on 12 February 2025 as the first extract from the reissue of their second studio album Tutta vita, the song won the Sanremo Music Festival 2025.

== Music video ==
A music video of "Balorda nostalgia", directed by Giulio Rosati, was released on 12 February 2025 via Olly's YouTube channel.

== Sanremo Music Festival ==
Italian broadcaster RAI organised the 75th edition of the Sanremo Music Festival between 11 and 15 February 2024. On 1 December 2024, Olly was announced among the participants of the festival, with the title of his competing entry revealed the following 18 December. Olly went on to win the festival, coming first with the public and second with the press and radio juries in the final round of voting.

Having won Sanremo, Olly could represent Italy at the upcoming Eurovision Song Contest, being granted the right of first refusal, as had been the case since 2015. He first declared he was unsure about accepting or not representing the country, ultimately declining on February 22. His replacement was runner-up Lucio Corsi with the song "Volevo essere un duro".

== Charts ==
=== Weekly charts ===
Chart performance for "Balorda nostalgia"
Chart (2025)	Peak position
Croatia International Airplay (Top lista)	39
Global 200 (Billboard)	56
Italy (FIMI)	1
Italy Airplay (EarOne)	3
Switzerland (Schweizer Hitparade)	6

=== Year-end charts ===
Chart (2025)	Position
Italy (FIMI)	1

== Certifications ==
Certifications for "Balorda nostalgia"
Region	Certification	Certified units/sales
Italy (FIMI)	4× Platinum	800,000^{‡}
Switzerland (IFPI Switzerland)	Gold	15,000^{‡}
^{‡} Sales+streaming figures based on certification alone.
