= La notte vola =

1989 single by Lorella Cuccarini

Single by Lorella Cuccarini
- B-side: "Lullabye Mix"
- Released: 1989
- Recorded: 1988
- Genre: Italo disco
- Length: 3:42
- Label: Polydor
- Songwriters: Silvio Testi; Marco Salvati; Peppe Vessicchio
- Producer: Silvio Testi

Lorella Cuccarini singles chronology
| "Io ballerò" (1987) | "La notte vola" (1989) | "Ascolta il cuore" (1991) |

"La notte vola" is a song recorded by Italian singer Lorella Cuccarini.

== Track listing and formats ==
- Italian 7-inch single

A. "La notte vola" – 3:42
B. "Lullabye Mix" – 4:12

== Credits and personnel ==
- Lorella Cuccarini – vocals
- Silvio Testi – songwriter, producer
- Marco Salvati – songwriter, arranger
- Peppe Vessicchio – songwriter, arranger
- Mario Tagliaferri – mixing

Credits and personnel adapted from the 7-inch single liner notes.

== Charts ==
Weekly chart performance for "La notte vola"
| Chart (1989) | Peak position |
|---|---|
| Italy (Musica e dischi) | 8 |

== Certifications and sales ==
Certifications and sales for "La notte vola"
| Region | Certification | Certified units/sales |
|---|---|---|
| Italy (FIMI) since 2009 | Gold | 35,000^{‡} |
^{‡} Sales+streaming figures based on certification alone.
