= Juli (record producer) =

Italian record producer and disc jockey (born 1998)

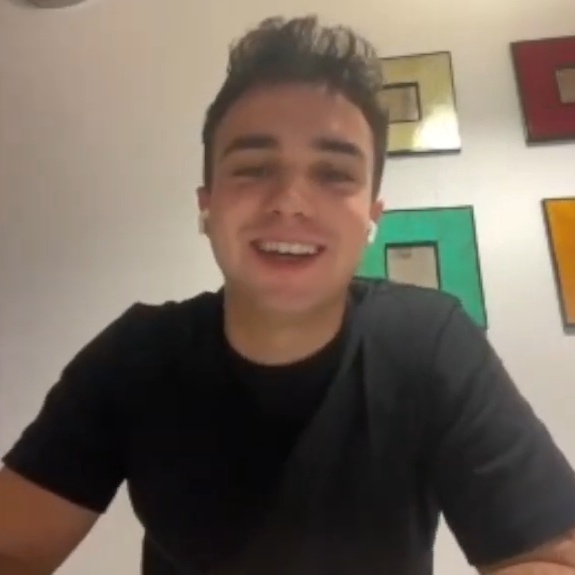
- Juli in 2024

Background information
- Also known as: Jvli
- Born: Julien Boverod; 8 August 1998 (age 27); Aosta, Aosta Valley, Italy
- Genres: Electropop
- Occupations: Record producer; disc jockey
- Instruments: Drums; guitar; accordion
- Works: Discography
- Years active: 2018–present
- Labels: Brioche Edizioni Musicali / Capitol (2018–2023); Epic (2023–present)

Julien Boverod (born 8 August 1998), known professionally as Juli (previously stylized as Jvli), is an Italian record producer and disc jockey.

== Life and career ==
Born into a family of musicians in the capital of the Aosta Valley, he studied music from an early age, learning to play drums, guitar, and accordion. He entered the recording world in 2017 after meeting another producer, aka Keezy, with whom he founded a recording studio. The following year, he began his professional career, collaborating with other producers and rappers. On 10 May 2019 he released his first studio album, Liberté, containing ten tracks.

In 2021 he gained increased visibility by producing six tracks on Fred De Palma's studio album Unico. He also produced the mixtape PLC Tape 1 (2022) for the same artist, which earned him his first Top Singles hits with "Mala" and "Tutto quello che ho". At the same time, he also began collaborating with Olly; in particular, among the various compositions and the EP Il mondo gira (2022), he was credited as producer on "Polvere", a song he performed in the main competition of the Sanremo Music Festival 2023. The unreleased track is also included on their collaborative LP Gira, il mondo gira, certified double platinum by FIMI for 100,000 equivalent units sold.

Olly also recorded "Devastante" (2024), which earned him his first top ten entry in the national charts and triple platinum status (300,000 units sold) from the Federazione Industria Musicale Italiana. That same year, a second collaborative album, Tutta vita, was released, topping the FIMI Album charts, certified eight times platinum by the same organization, and driven by the commercial successes "Quei ricordi là" and "Per due come noi"; in fact, the latter marked his first number one in Italy, where it is now triple platinum. The album also features the track "Scarabocchi", his third top ten entry as a lead artist in Italy.

He also took care of the production of "Balorda nostalgia", an unreleased song proposed by Olly at the 75th Sanremo Music Festival; the song, greeted with immediate success in streaming, debuted directly at the top of the Top Singles chart and was certified triple platinum; it thus became his second number one as a composer, and on the occasion of the final of the event, it was declared the winning song. On 23 May the single "Depresso fortunato" was released, again with Olly, which debuted at eighth position in the Top Singles chart and was later certified platinum. On 29 August the single "Questa domenica" was released, again with Olly, which debuted at the top of the Top Singles chart and was later certified platinum.

On 20 March 2026 the single "Quelli come me" was released in collaboration with Coez, which preceded his fourth studio album Solito cinema, released on 24 April 2026.

== Discography ==
- Liberté (2019)
- Gira, il mondo gira with Olly (2023)
- Tutta vita with Olly (2024)
- Solito cinema (2026)
