= Believe Music =

French record company

Believe SAS
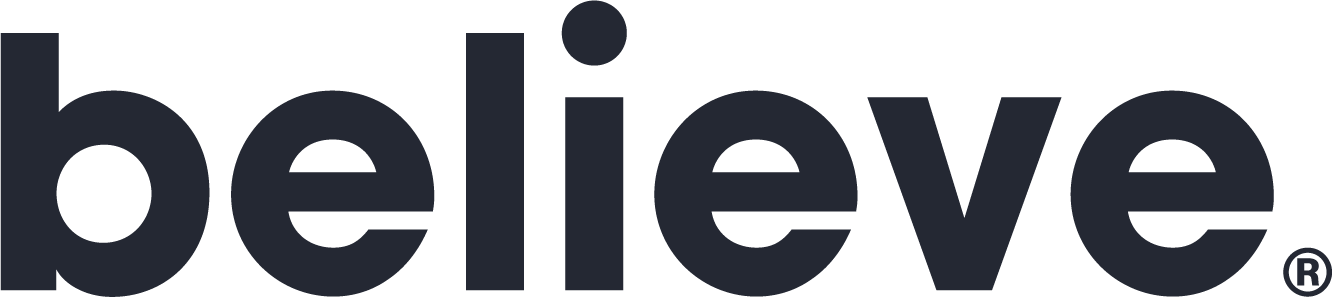
- Type: Public
- Traded as: Euronext Paris: BLV; CAC All-Share
- Industry: Music
- Founded: April 7, 2005; 21 years ago
- Headquarters: Paris, France
- Number of locations: 50 countries
- Area served: Worldwide
- Key people: Denis Ladegaillerie (Chief Executive Officer and founder); Xavier Dumont (Chief Financial & Strategy Officer); Béatrice Dumurgier (Chief Operating Officer)
- Services: Music publishing; Digital distribution
- Revenue: €988.8 million (2024)
- Number of employees: 1 650 employees (2023)
- Website: believe.com

Believe SAS (also known as Believe Music, and formerly Believe Digital) is a global, invite-only digital music company headquartered in France that works with established artists and record labels, like Inna, Sevdaliza, and, Nancy Ajram. The company has several sub-companies and brands for small artists including TuneCore, Nuclear Blast, Groove Attack, Play Two and AllPoints.

The company also owns Naïve Records.

Believe exists in more than 50 countries in Europe, America, Asia and Africa.

== History ==
=== Beginnings ===
The company was founded in 2005 by Denis Ladegaillerie, Arnaud Chiaramonti and Nicolas Laclias.

The company operates from Paris, and was introduced on Euronext marketplace in June 2021 and it raised 300 million euros. Believe also has a subsidiary in Luxembourg (Believe International) which serves as a hub for the digital distribution.

=== Growth ===
Believe's expansion was fuelled by $60m growth capital investment from Ventech, Technology Crossover Ventures (TCV) and XAnge]. In August 2016, the company acquired the French independent label Naive Records for €10m, seeking to improve value from the company's extensive back catalogue, and restarted the label's issuing of new recordings as physical CDs in 2017.

In 2019, Believe expanded its presence in both Russia and India. The Group's market shares in these countries are 25% and 15% respectively. In India, there are Bollywood stars in the Group's catalog, like Ayushmann Khurrana.

In 2021, Believe generated $682M in annual revenues, increasing compared to the previous year.

By the end of 2022, Believe demonstrated its growth model. The organic growth target of 2022 raised for the second time to over 30% and was expected to exceed the targets set at the Initial Public Offering (IPO). Believe's performance in 2022 witnessed an acceleration in growth as compared to the prior year. Indeed, the company increased revenues by €135.8 million (30.7% Year-over-Year), from €441.4 million in 2020. Accordingly, Believe's 2022 revenue increased to reach €452.4 million in Europe, €199.3 million in Asia-Pacific and Africa, and €109.2 million in the Americas.

In 2023, it was reported that Believe has exceeded the milestone of €1 billion in digital music sales (DMS) for 2022, which reflected the effectiveness of Believe's business model and strategy that mainly seek to support artists and labels at each stage of their careers. The same year, it was also reported that Believe has one of the highest growth rates in the music streaming industry due to its digital positioning and its proactive investment strategy in emerging areas, particularly Asia.

In 2023, Believe announced €760 million in sales for 2022.

=== Acquisitions and affiliates ===
In 2015, Believe announced the acquisition of Musicast. The same year, TuneCore, the U.S. digital distribution company is acquired by Believe Digital.

In 2016, Believe acquired Naïve.

In 2017, Believe Recordings became AllPoints and developed its production sector with the launch of 3 labels: All Points, Naïve and Animal 63.

In 2018, Believe acquired a majority stake in the German metal label Nuclear Blast. Also, Believe acquired the German label Groove Attack. The same year, it took 49% stake in Lili Louise Musique, then, in September 2018, Believe acquired a 49% stake in French indie label Tôt ou Tard from Wagram Music.

In 2019, Believe acquired Mumbai live event production specialist Entco, and rebranded the company “Believe Entertainment”. The same year, Believe acquired three other Indian companies : Bollywood music specialist Venus Music Private Ltd which includes well-known Bollywood movie trailers, Entco Music Private Ltd.(production of live events) and Canvas Talent Private Ltd, India-based artist services, development and booking company, specialized in services for artists. In the same year, Believe took 49% stake in 6&7 SAS.

In 2020, the company acquired a majority stake (60%) in the Turkish Doğan Music Company, for €18.8 million, a stake in Ircam Amplify, an entity of the Institut de Recherche et de Coordination Acoustique/Musique (IRCAM), and the assets of SoundsGood, specialized in the creation of playlists on streaming platforms. The same year in February, Believe and Nuclear Blast launched Blood Blast distribution which would offer dedicated distribution to digital streaming and download platforms and help artists as well as brands make their music accessible to audiences worldwide.

In 2021, Believe took a 25% stake in Play Two, France's leading independent music label and a subsidiary of the TF1 Group. The same year, Believe acquired 15% stake in Philippines-based Viva Music And Artists Group, 51% stake in French Indie label Jo&Co, and a 76% stake in South India-based label Think Music. Also in 2021, it was reported that Believe made 18 acquisitions in the previous six years.

In March 2023, Believe acquired the British music publisher Sentric Music for $51 million. Believe's acquisition of this tech-powered music publishing platform reflected its plans to move into music publishing.

Believe's inclination towards publishing is seen in its recent investments in Europe, India and Asia to globally expand and develop. For example, Believe partnered with the French pop label Structure and the Germany-based brand Madizin Music. Believe also formed a partnership with the Indian label Panorama Music.

In March 2024, Warner Music Group revealed that it had placed a bid to acquire Believe, in a deal valued at 17 euros per share, or roughly 1.65 billion euros. In April 2024, WMG cancelled its bid.

== Activities ==
In September 2022, YouTube launched its new option 'Creator Music' and Believe was among its independent partners.

In March 2023, it was announced that Believe is launching a new distribution unit, Avant-Garde, to help different French labels, artists and producers in the diverse genres of Rap, Afro and R&B.

In late-April 2023, Believe revealed that it was exploring numerous artificial intelligence partnerships. Indeed, Believe tends to focus on how AI can efficiently help the company implement its main functions, marketing and promotion.

In May 2023, Believe was among global distribution partners of TikTok to launch its 'Artist Impact Program' which enables artists to participate in TikTok's Commercial Music Library and allows them to add trending songs to this Commercial Music Library with the possibility of monetizing their music. More precisely, Believe was part of the Commercial Music Library's network of partnerships that supported the realization of TikTok's program devoted to 'discovering and rediscovering artists'.

== Artists ==
Believe's strategy includes scouting out singers and helping them launch their careers online. In August 2023, it was reported that Believe included 1.3 million artists.

== Awards ==
In September 2019, the French government identified Believe as one of the 40 most promising French start-ups, with the French Tech Next40 index. In October 2019, Believe was named Europe's “Allstar” Company at the 17th Annual Investor Allstars Awards in London.

== Copyright controversy ==
In January 2026, senior officials of Believe Music India and foreign executives including Chris Meehan and Loren McShane of UK-based Sentric Music Publishing were named as accused in a Patiala police FIR alleging diversion of royalties in the “Ishqam” song royalty fraud case filed by Navrattan Music.

In subsequent proceedings, a local court dismissed the anticipatory bail application of Vivek Raina, CEO of Believe Music India, in connection with the matter. The case remains under investigation.

Believe has been accused of copyright trolling, particularly on YouTube, where it has been alleged to engage in claiming copyright for works that are either copyright free or that they do not own the rights to. The company was the subject of a New York federal lawsuit alleging that they were behind large scale, willful copyright infringement. Concerning the copyright and its management, Believe submits content under its license and available on YouTube through the Content ID algorithm, YouTube's automatic-identification system that detects copyright-protected content on the platform. If the system finds a match, a Content ID claim is applied to the matching content. Despite the previous lawsuit, Believe Music has persisted in making copyright claims even on music very clearly in the public domain and on songs by independent artists.
