= Olly (singer) =

Italian singer-songwriter and rapper (born 2001)

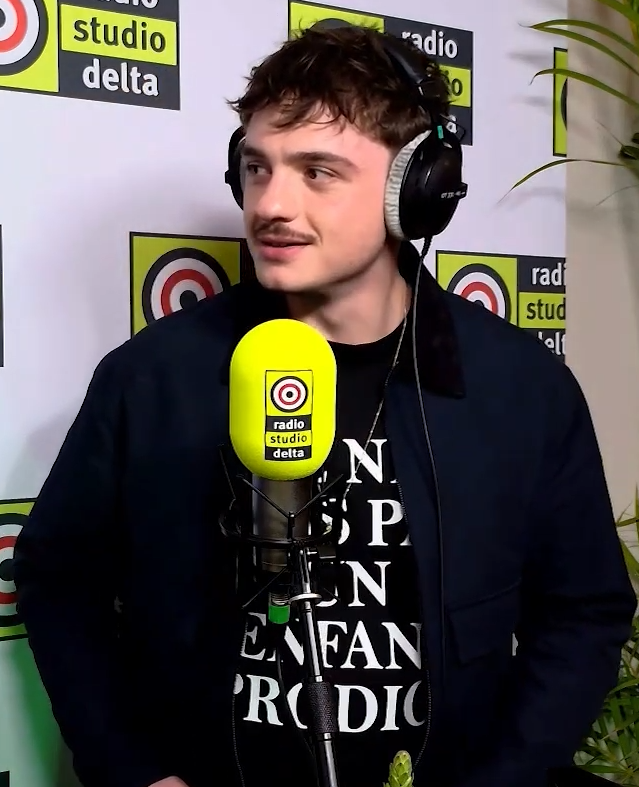
- Olly in February 2025

Background information
- Born: Federico Olivieri; 5 May 2001 (age 25); Genoa, Italy
- Genres: Pop; hip hop; R&B
- Occupations: Singer; songwriter; rapper
- Instrument: Vocals
- Works: Discography
- Years active: 2016–present
- Labels: Aleph; Epic; Sony Music; UrbanLabel Global; LaTarma

Federico Olivieri (born 5 May 2001), known professionally as Olly, is an Italian singer-songwriter and rapper.

He first achieved national recognition after being selected as one of the six winners of Sanremo Giovani 2022 with the song "L'anima balla", afterwards competing in the Sanremo Music Festival 2023 with the song "Polvere". He later won the Sanremo Music Festival 2025 with the song "Balorda nostalgia".

== Early life ==
Olivieri was born in Genoa to a father who worked as a lawyer and a mother who was a judge. His family later settled in the Foce district. He played rugby in his youth. During his early musical studies, he enrolled at the Genoa Conservatory, where he studied music and singing. He later moved to Milan and graduated from the University of Milan with a degree in business and management in 2022.

== Career ==
Olly's musical career began in 2016, when he formed the music collective Madmut Branco, with which he released his first musical project, Piacere Mixtape. In 2017, he released his first solo project, an EP titled Namaste, in collaboration with Matsby. That year, he was also featured on fellow Genoese musician Alfa's single "Chiara Ferragni". The following year, he released his second EP, CRY4U, and his first single, "Bla-Bla Car".

In 2021, he posted a cover of Arisa's song "La notte" on Instagram. The video proved to be successful, and the song was later released as a single, titled "La notte (RMX)", in collaboration with Arisa herself. In the spring of the same year, he obtained his first record deal with the Aleph Records label, distributed by Epic Records for Sony Music. In July 2021, he was named "Artist of the Month" by MTV New Generation.

In September 2022, he opened for Blanco at the latter's concert in Genoa. Later that year, he was one of 12 acts selected to compete in Sanremo Giovani, a televised competition aimed at selecting six newcomers as contestants of the Sanremo Music Festival 2023. His song, "L'anima balla", was a finalist, and he advanced to the main festival competition. His entry, "Polvere", finished in 24th place. Following the festival, he released his first studio album, Gira, il mondo gira.

In October 2024, he released his second studio album, Tutta vita, which achieved FIMI platinum status. That December, he was announced as one of the participants in the Sanremo Music Festival 2025 with the song "Balorda nostalgia". He ultimately won the festival. Despite this victory, he declined to participate in the Eurovision Song Contest 2025, citing conflicts with his tour schedule.

== Controversies ==
In 2023, the singer apologised for homophobia following social media circulation of a video of a freestyle rap he performed in 2019, at the age of eighteen, in which he used a derogatory term toward homosexuals as an insult and conflated homosexuality with HIV/AIDS.

The singer has been criticized for promoting violence against women through his lyrics. Following the murder of Giulia Cecchettin, Olly changed the lyrics of his song "Mai e poi mai" during a concert held at Fabrique Milano where the words "I'll marry her or I'll kill her" and "I sure won't leave her to be with you" were replaced with "I'll marry her or I'll let her go" and "For me she can do as she pleases". In an interview with Corriere della Sera, Olly explained:

I wrote that song when I was 17, after my first love, a crazy story. I had idealized that relationship so much. And that rhyme there was hyperbole, an extreme metaphor. Even at the time, those who worked with me told me that it was too much, but I always stuck to the moment of writing. [...] I felt uncomfortable singing that rhyme and I thought of ten different phrases to replace it with. Then, while live, my brain went blank, and that new rhyme just came to me. There were those who accused me of bending to censorship or seeking popular consent. I would never change the lyrics because I have respect for the person who wrote them. But I had the emotional maturity to think it was wrong to sing that song that way.

== Discography ==
- Gira, il mondo gira with Juli (2023)
- Tutta vita with Juli (2024)

Awards and achievements
Preceded by Angelina Mango	Sanremo Music Festival; Winner; 2025	Succeeded by Sal Da Vinci
