= Sarah Toscano discography =

Discography of Italian singer-songwriter and actress Sarah Toscano

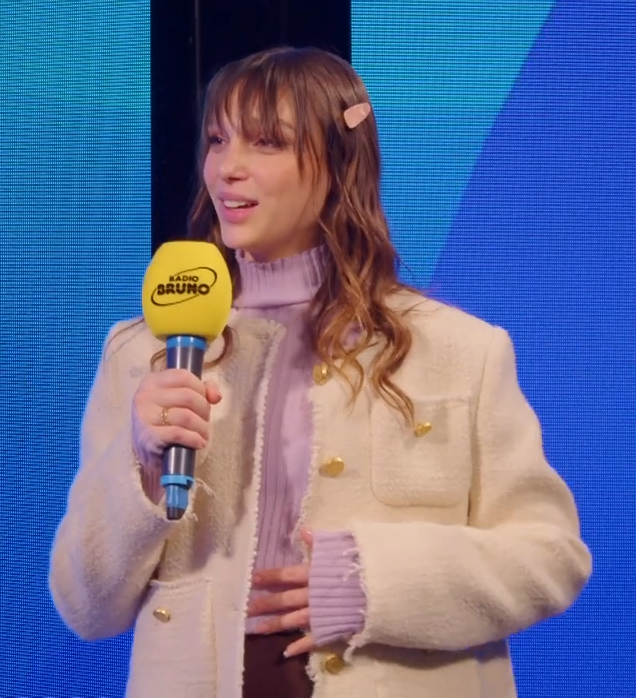
- Sarah Toscano in February 2025
- Studio albums: 1
- EPs: 2
- Singles: 15
- Music videos: 15

The discography of Italian singer-songwriter and actress Sarah Toscano consists of one studio album, two EPs, fifteen singles and as many music videos.

== Studio albums ==
List of albums, with selected chart positions
Title	Album details	Peak chart positions	Certifications
Title	Album details	ITA	Certifications
Met Gala	Released: 3 October 2025; Label: Warner Music Italy; Format: CD, LP (Note: Published on 28 October 2025.), digital download, streaming	6	FIMI: Gold

== Extended plays ==
List of EPs and with selected chart positions
Title	EP details	Peak chart positions
Title	EP details	ITA
Riflesso	Released: 21 October 2022; Label: Universal Music Italia; Format: CD, digital download, streaming	—
Sarah (Note: Credited as simply Sarah.)	Released: 17 May 2024; Label: Warner Music Italy; Format: CD, digital download, streaming	12
"—" denotes EP that did not chart or were not released.

== Singles ==
=== As lead artist ===
List of singles, with chart positions and album name
Title	Year	Peak chart positions		Certifications	Album or EP
Title	Year	ITA	SMR	Certifications	Album or EP
"9 giugno"	2022	—	—		Riflesso
"Touché"	2023	—	—		Sarah
"Viole e violini"	2023	—	—		Sarah
"Mappamondo"	2024	—	—		Sarah
"Sexy magica"	2024	83	42		Sarah
"Roulette"	2024	—	—		Sarah
"Tacchi (fra le dita)"	2024	—	—		Met Gala
"Amarcord"	2025	19	—	FIMI: Gold	Met Gala
"Taki"	2025	82	—		Met Gala
"Semplicemente" (with Mida)	2025	46	50		Met Gala
"Maledetto ti amo"	2025	—	—		Met Gala
"Atlantide"	2026	66	—		Met Gala
"Affinché nessuno ci cancelli"	2026	—	—		Non-album single
"—" denotes singles that did not chart or were not released.

=== As featured artist ===
List of singles as featured artist, with chart positions and album name
Title	Year	Peak chart positions		Album or EP
Title	Year	ITA	SMR	Album or EP
"Safety Net" (Bea and her Business featuring Sarah Toscano)	2024	—	—	Bea and her Business
"Perfect" (Carl Brave featuring Sarah Toscano)	2025	62	18	Notti brave amarcord
"—" denotes singles that did not chart or were not released.

== Guest appearances ==
List of songs as featured artist, with album name
Title	Year	Album
"Ombre" (Chris Nolan featuring Carl Brave, Sarah Toscano and Giuse The Lizia)	2026	La tavola dell'umore

== Album and soundtrack appearances ==
=== Compilation ===
Title	Year	Album
"Sexy magica"	2024	105 Summer Festival 2024; Battiti Live 2024
"Amarcord"	2025	Sanremo 2025
"Perfect" (Carl Brave featuring Sarah Toscano)	2025	Battiti Live 2025; Radio Italia Summer Hits 2025
"Taki"	2025	Battiti Live 2025

=== Soundtrack ===
Title	Year	Movies/Series	Notes
"Semplicemente" (with Mida; theme song)	2025	Riv4lries	
"Atlantide"	2026	Feel My Voice	

=== Music tracks and covers ===
Title	Year	Artist(s)	Album or EP	Notes
"Ossidiana" (uncredited)	2024	Holden	Joseph	
"Overdrive" (cover)	2025	Ofenbach feat. Norma Jean Martine	Non-album single	(Note: Performed for the first time with Ofenbach on 14 February 2025 during the fourth evening dedicated to the covers of the 75th Sanremo Festival, in which the singer-songwriter participated in the competition for the first time.)

== Music videos ==
Title	Year	Director(s)
"Sexy magica"	2024	Byron Rosero
"Roulette"	2024	Gianni Gentile
"Tacchi (fra le dita)"	2024	Puro
"Amarcord"	2025	Byron Rosero
"Perfect"	2025	Maurizio Zanieri
"Taki"	2025	Byron Rosero
"Semplicemente"	2025	Amedeo Zancanella
"Met Gala" (visual video)	2025	Giulio Pipitone
"Desco" (visual video)	2025	Luca "Dopoesco" Pipitone
"Maledetto ti amo" (visual video)	2025	Luca "Dopoesco" Pipitone
"Dopo di te" (visual video)	2025	Luca "Dopoesco" Pipitone
"Caos" (visual video)	2025	Luca "Dopoesco" Pipitone
"Match Point" (visual video)	2025	Luca "Dopoesco" Pipitone
"Atlantide"	2026	Attilio Cusani
"Affinché nessuno ci cancelli"	2026	Attilio Cusani

Video appearances by other artists

Title	Year	Artist(s)	Role(s)	Director(s)
"Superman"	2026	Federica Abbate	Bridesmaid (with Clara)	Tania Caporaso
