= Amarcord (disambiguation) =

Amarcord is a 1973 film directed by Federico Fellini.

Amarcord may also refer to:

- Amarcord (ensemble), German male classical vocal ensemble based in Leipzig
- "Amarcord" (song), 2025 song by Sarah Toscano from the album Met Gala
- "Amarcord", 2025 song by Carl Brave from the album Notti brave amarcord
