= Lele (singer) =

Italian singer-songwriter (born 1996)

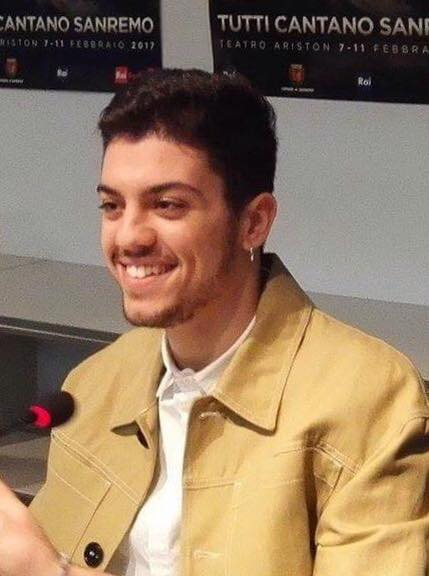
- Lele in Sanremo Music Festival 2017

Background information
- Born: Raffaele Esposito; 23 December 1996 (age 29); Pollena Trocchia, Campania, Italy
- Genres: Pop
- Occupations: Singer; songwriter
- Instruments: Vocals; guitar; piano
- Years active: 2015–present
- Label: Sony Music

Raffaele Esposito (born 23 December 1996), known professionally as Lele, is an Italian singer-songwriter. In 2017 he won the 67th Sanremo Music Festival in the "New Proposals" section with the song "Ora mai".

== Biography ==
=== 2015–2016: Amici 15 and Costruire ===
Born in 1996, Lele was interested in music from an early age and at the age of twelve he entered the Conservatory of San Pietro a Majella in Naples, where he studied piano. He also plays the guitar as a self-taught. In 2015 he participated in the third edition of the talent show The Voice of Italy in J-Ax's team but was eliminated during the 2nd Live Show. The following year he participated in the fifteenth edition of the talent show Amici di Maria De Filippi, entering the evening show in Emma and Elisa's white team. Lele reached the final on 25 May 2016, finishing fourth behind the singers Sergio Sylvestre and Elodie and the dancer Gabriele Esposito.

A few days after the final of the program, on 27 May, he released his first album Costruire which includes unreleased songs and covers sung during the talent show. The album entered the charts, reaching third place. Following the release of the album, he embarked on an instore tour, performing live. During the summer he took part in various musical events, such as the Summer Festival, the Festival Show and the Radio Bruno event. In autumn 2016 he was the opening act for various musical artists. For Emma Marrone he opened the concerts on 28 September in Ancona, on 6 October in Pescara, on 14 October in Conegliano and on 15 October in Padua. For Elisa he opened the On Tour on 19 and 20 November (Rome), on 25 and 26 November (Milan) and on 3 December (Naples). On 8 December 2016, during a live broadcast on his Facebook profile, he announced the release of his new single "L'ho voluto io (Alternative Version)", the third single from his debut album.

=== 2016–2020: Sanremo Music Festival 2017 and Black Love Parthenope ===
On 7 November 2016 he announced his participation in the programme Sarà Sanremo, where he competed with 11 other singers for access to the Sanremo Music Festival. On 25 January 2017 Lele was a guest at the La Rua concert in Rome. They also sang together with Elodie "La sera dei miracoli" by Lucio Dalla. In February 2017 he participated in the Sanremo Music Festival 2017 in the "New Proposals" section, winning with the song "Ora mai". The song was included in the re-release of his debut album entitled Costruire 2.0, released on 10 February 2017 with Sony Music, which includes 12 unreleased tracks, all written or co-written by Lele himself, who is starting the Costruire 2.0 Instore tour.

In February, the first dates of the Costruire 2.0 Live tour were announced. On April 4, Lele announced the second single from Costruire 2.0, "Così com'è", which will be broadcast on radio rotation starting 7 April. On April 5, Mario Volanti, director of Radio Italia, announced his participation in the Radio Italia Live event on 18 June at Piazza del Duomo in Milan. Furthermore, on 15 May, he was announced as a special guest, along with Chiara, at the preview of Michele Bravi's Anime di carta tour, on 20 May in Milan. On May 26, he received an award in Pomigliano d'Arco for his victory at Sanremo, and the following day he attended the TIM MTV Awards in Rome.

On June 15 2018, Lele released the single "Giungla", followed in 2019 by his second album, Black Love Parthenope. On 14 January 2020, the web series 4 on the Boat was released, in which Lele discusses social issues.

== Discography ==
=== Studio albums ===
List of albums, with selected chart positions
Title	Album details	Peak chart positions
Title	Album details	ITA
Costruire	Released: 27 May 2016; Label: Sony Music; Format: CD, digital download, streaming	3
Black Love Parthenope	Released: 28 June 2019; Label: RCA, Sony Music; Format: CD, digital download, streaming	—
"—" denotes album that did not chart or were not released.

=== Singles ===
List of singles, with chart positions and album name
Title	Year	Peak chart positions	Album or EP
Title	Year	ITA	Album or EP
"La strada verso casa"	2016	85	Costruire
"Through This Noise"	2016	—	Costruire
"L'ho voluto io"	2016	—	Costruire
"Ora mai"	2017	36	Costruire 2.0
"Così com'è	2017	—	Costruire 2.0
"Giungla"	2018	—	Black Love Parthenope
"Chiuso"	2022	—	Non-album single
"—" denotes singles that did not chart or were not released.

== Songwriting credits ==
List of selected songs co-written by Lele
Title	Year	Artist(s)	Album or EP
"Luce e cenere"	2020	Jacopo Ottonello	Colori
"E invece"	2020	Jacopo Ottonello	Colori
"Se parlo di te"	2020	Jacopo Ottonello	Colori
"In due minuti"	2021	Marco Mengoni	Materia (Terra)
"L'una di notte"	2022	Mydrama	Non-album single
"Stelle"	2023	Annalisa	E poi siamo finiti nel vortice
"Venere/Venus"	2023	Laura Pausini	Anime Parallele
"Sexy magica"	2024	Sarah Toscano	Sarah
"Replay"	2024	SLF	Non-album single
"Okay okay (S1 E2)"	2024	Mameli	Fino all'ultimo respiro
"Jacquemus blu"	2024	Vale Lambo	Lamborghini a via Marina
"Roulette"	2024	Sarah Toscano	Sarah
"Forse per sempre"	2024	Selmi	Non-album single
"Real og"	2024	SLF	We The Squad vol. 2
"Dove ti trovi tu"	2025	Antonia	Relax
"Romantica"	2025	Antonia	Relax
"Weekend"	2025	Antonia	Relax
"Le curve"	2025	Antonia	Relax
"L'ultima canzone"	2025	Selmi and Chiamamifaro	Non-album single
"Met Gala"	2025	Sarah Toscano	Met Gala

== Television program ==
Year	Title	Network	Notes
2015–2016	Amici di Maria De Filippi	Canale 5	Contestant, fourth place (season 15)

== Tour ==
- 2017 – Costruire 2.0 Live tour

== Participation in singing events ==
- Sanremo Music Festival (Rai 1)
  - 2017 – 1st place in the "New proposals" section with "Ora mai"
- Sanremo Giovani (Rai 1)
  - 2016 – Finalist with "Ora mai"
