= Foresti (surname) =

Foresti is a surname. Notable people with the surname include:

- Bruno Foresti (1923–2022), Italian Catholic prelate
- Eleuterio Felice Foresti (1789–1858), Italian patriot and scholar
- Florence Foresti (born 1973), French comedian and actress
- Giacomo Filippo Foresti (1434–1520), Augustinian friar and author
- Gianfranco Foresti (born 1950), Italian racing cyclist
- Lucas Foresti (born 1992), Brazilian racing driver
- Pietro Foresti (born 1977), Italian music producer, engineer, and manager
- Traute Foresti (1915–2015), Austrian poet and actress
