= Tancredi (singer) =

Italian singer (born 2001)

- Born: Tancredi Cantù Rajnoldi; 6 March 2001 (age 25); Milan, Italy
- Genres: Pop; hip-hop
- Occupations: Singer; rapper; songwriter
- Years active: Vocals
- Label: Warner

Tancredi Cantù Rajnoldi (born 6 March 2001), known mononymously as Tancredi, is an Italian singer-songwriter and rapper.

== Career ==
Tancredi is the son of Alberto Cantù Rajnoldi, the creative director for menswear at the Giorgio Armani fashion group. His greatest inspiration as a young man was Italian hip-hop. He participated in the 20th season of the talent show Amici di Maria De Filippi, where he was eliminated in the semifinals in 2021. His song "Las Vegas," presented on Amici, was a chart success, and his subsequently released EP "Iride" was also a success.

After a brief creative break, Tancredi returned in 2022 with his debut studio album "Golden Hour." He contributed the title song "Isole" to the first season of the Italian Netflix series Di4ries and also appeared in several guest appearances.

Tancredi participated in Sanremo Giovani in 2023 with the song "Perle", which reached the final but did not get selected. He returned there the following year with the song "Standing Ovation", which reached the semi-final.

== Discography ==
=== Studio albums ===
List of studio albums, with selected chart positions and certifications
| Title | Album details | Peak chart positions |
| Title | Album details | ITA |
|---|---|---|
| Golden Hour | Released: 21 January 2022; Label: Warner Music Italy; Formats: CD, digital download | 48 |

=== Extended plays ===
List of extended plays, with selected chart positions and certifications
| Title | Album details | Peak chart positions |
| Title | Album details | ITA |
|---|---|---|
| Iride | Released: 14 May 2021; Label: Warner Music Italy; Formats: CD, digital download | 4 |

=== Singles ===
==== As lead artist ====
| Title | Year | Peak positions | Certifications | Album |
| Title | Year | ITA | Certifications | Album |
|---|---|---|---|---|
| "Las Vegas" | 2021 | 9 | FIMI: 2x Platinum | Iride |
| "Leggi dell’universo" | 2021 | 92 | | Iride |
