= Met Gala (album) =

Studio album by Sarah Toscano
- Released: 3 October 2025
- Recorded: 2024–2025
- Genres: Pop; dance-pop
- Length: 28:08
- Label: Warner Music Italy
- Producers: Chris Nolan; Cripo; Due; GRND; ITACA; Riccardo Scirè; Shune; Wolvs

Singles from Met Gala
- 1. "Tacchi fra le dita" Released: 4 October 2024; 2. "Amarcord" Released: 12 February 2025; 3. "Taki" Released: 23 May 2025; 4. "Semplicemente" Released: 12 September 2025; 5. "Maledetto ti amo" Released: 28 November 2025; 6. "Atlantide" Released: 3 April 2026

Met Gala is the debut studio album by Italian singer-songwriter Sarah Toscano, released on 3 October 2025 by Warner Music Italy.

The album included the single "Amarcord", with which Toscano competed during the 75th Sanremo Music Festival, finishing in seventeenth place.

== Background and composition ==
In October 2024, Toscano began work on her album, releasing its first single, "Tacchi (fra le dita)". In February 2025, Toscano competed in the 75th Sanremo Music Festival with the song "Amarcord," also included on the album.

Primarily a pop and dance-pop record, the album features country, electropop, hip-hop and urban influences. The recording project consists of ten tracks written by Toscano herself and others including Alessandro La Cava, Andrea Blanc, Enè, Eugenio Maimone, Federica Abbate, Giampiero Gentile, Mida, Nuvola, Olly, Jacopo Ettorre, Lele, Rocco Biazzi and Rondine, and producers including Chris Nolan, Cripo, Due, GRND, ITACA, Riccardo Scirè, Shune and Wolvs.

The project, an autobiographical tale by the singer-songwriter, deals with themes related to everyday life at the end of a love story, discomfort, tennis and fashion, as well as the reference in the title to the charity event of the same name that takes place annually at the Costume Institute of the Metropolitan Museum of Art in New York City. In an interview with the magazine TV Sorrisi e Canzoni, Toscano said that the choice of the title and the meaning of the album "...is a wish for my future, I want to aim high. Participating in an event like this means having achieved real success. Sometimes I'm myself and every now and then it takes a boost of self-esteem. This is a reminder to think positively."

Interviewed by All Music Italia, Toscano talked about the creative process behind the album:

In some songs on this album, I wanted to go a little higher with my voice. And in this sense, "Maledetto ti amo" was the most difficult song to record. I co-wrote all the songs, but the album is a bit of a stream of consciousness. It's hard to say which was the hardest song to write. The title represents the desire to succeed, to set goals, to dream big. That would be a lot. [...] I wanted to play a lot. "Caos" is the first post-Amici song. I looked for other paths; I didn't want to be pigeonholed into just one genre. I talked about myself in many different ways. "Match Point," on the other hand, was the last song we wrote. We wanted to have fun and make a reference to tennis, which is a passion of mine: in this song, I use metaphors between the sport and everyday life. It's a song with a very arrogant sound, with less melodic pop than other songs like "Caos" or "Met Gala".

== Cover ==
Toscano explained the meaning behind the cover image, which features her in an evening dress on a red carpet surrounded by paparazzi:

The idea came from me and my team, especially Luca Pipitone [dopoesco], who is the creative director of the overall artwork. We created the entire imagery for the album together, from the photos to the vinyl and CD graphics. I wanted to feel like a diva, even if just for a moment: the paparazzi all around, the photos, the light.

== Promotion ==
=== Album ===
On 2 September 2025 Toscano shared a Met Gala teaser video via her social media profiles. On 15 September Toscano revealed the album's 3 October release via her social media profiles, along with the list of its ten tracks. On 1 October, two days before its release, the album was presented and promoted by the singer-songwriter herself at a press conference in Milan. The following day, the singer-songwriter shared a second teaser video for the album's release on her social media profiles, which was followed by a release party, also held in Milan to coincide with the album's release.

Upon its release, the album was made available only for digital and streaming platforms and for the standard and autographed edition for CD. On 28 October 2025 the album was also released in an autographed version for vinyl.

=== Singles ===
The first single from the album, "Tacchi (fra le dita)", was released on 4 October 2024. Toscano previewed it on 29 September during the first episode of the twenty-fourth edition of the talent show Amici di Maria De Filippi.

The album's second single, "Amarcord", was released on 12 February 2025, coinciding with Toscano performance at the 75th Sanremo Music Festival.

The third single from the album was "Taki", released on 23 May 2025 and previewed on 18 May during the ninth final episode of the evening of the twenty-fourth edition of the talent show Amici di Maria De Filippi.

On 12 September 2025 the fourth single from the album, "Semplicemente", was released, featuring a duet with Mida, which premiered live on 2 September at Future Hits Live at the Verona Arena. The song was then used as the theme song and as the soundtrack of the youth series Riv4lries, available on Netflix from 1 October.

On 28 November 2025 the fourth track "Maledetto ti amo" entered radio rotation as the fifth single from the album, performed in preview on 13 August at the Red Valley Festival in Olbia (SS), on the occasion of the fifteenth date of the "Sarah Toscano Summer tour 2025".

On 3 April 2026 "Atlantide" was made available as the first single from the digital re-release, created for the soundtrack of the film Feel My Voice directed by Luca Ribuoli, in which the singer-songwriter made her debut as a leading actress.

=== Tour ===
- "Sarah Toscano Met Gala instore tour 2025":
  - This is an instore tour of shopping centers taking place on ten dates from 3 to 23 October 2025: 3 October in Bussolengo (VR), 4 October in Nichelino (TO), 5 October in Genoa, 6 October in Arese (MI), 7 October in Catania, 8 October in Rome, 9 October in Trevi (PG), 12 October in Pagani (SA), 16 October in Roncadelle (BS) and 23 October in Mestre (VE);
- "Sarah Toscano Live 2025":
  - These are two live club concerts which will take place respectively on 18 October at the Magazzini Generali in Milan and on 25 October 2025 at the Largo Venue in Rome, which on 7 April both sold out.
- "Met Gala tour 2026":
  - This is a tour of seven dates of concerts live clubs from 9 to 23 May 2026: 9 May at the Eremo Club in Molfetta (BA), 10 May at the Duel Club in Naples, 14 May at the Hiroshima Mon amour in Turin, 15 May at the Viper Theatre in Florence, 17 May at the Largo Venue in Rome, 22 May at the Hall in Padua and 23 May at the Magazzini Generali in Milan.

== Track listing ==
Met Gala – Standard track listing
No.	Title	Lyrics	Music	Producer(s)	Length
1.	"Met Gala"	Sarah Toscano; Giampiero Gentile; Raffaele Esposito	Toscano; Gentile; Esposito	Due	2:46
2.	"Semplicemente" (from the Netflix series "RIV4LI") (with Mida)	Toscano; Christian Prestato; Tommaso Santoni	Toscano; Prestato; Santoni; Gianmarco Grande	GRND	3:07
3.	"Desco"	Toscano; Elisa Mariotti; Santoni	Toscano; Mariotti; Grande	GRND	2:45
4.	"Maledetto ti amo"	Toscano; Emanuela Caricchia	Toscano; Caricchia; Grande	GRND	2:49
5.	"Taki"	Toscano; Alessandro La Cava; Federica Abbate	La Cava; Abbate; Nicola Lazzarin	Cripo	2:33
6.	"Dopo di te"	Toscano; Mariotti	Toscano; Mariotti; Grande	GRND	3:08
7.	"Amarcord"	Toscano; Abbate; Jacopo Ettorre	Eugenio Maimone; Federico Mercuri; Giordano Cremona; Ettorre; Abbate; Leonardo Grillotti	ITACA; Wolvs	3:02
8.	"Tacchi (fra le dita)"	Federico Olivieri; Abbate	Mercuri; Cremona; Maimone; Grillotti	ITACA; Wolvs	2:46
9.	"Caos"	Toscano; Andrea Spigaroli	Toscano; Riccardo Scirè; Spigaroli	Scirè	2:33
10.	"Match Point"	Toscano; La Cava	Toscano; La Cava; Luca Ghiazzi; Rocco Biazzi	Shune	2:38

Met Gala – Physical edition bonus tracks
No.	Title	Length
11.	"Tacchi (fra le dita)" (acoustic version)	2:46
12.	"Amarcord" (acoustic version)	3:03

Met Gala: Limited Edition – bonus track
No.	Title	Lyrics	Music	Producer(s)	Length
11.	"Atlantide" (from the Netflix film Feel My Voice)	Toscano	Toscano; Christian Mazzocchi; Michele Bargigia	Chris Nolan	2:44

== Personnel ==
- Sarah Toscano – vocals
- Christian "Mida" Prestato – featured vocals (track 2)
- Christian "Chris Nolan" Mazzocchi – production (track 11 on the digital reissue)
- Due – programming, production, recording (tracks 1)
- Federico Mercuri – programming, production (tracks 7–8)
- Gianmarco "GRND" Grande – programming, production, recording (track 2–4, 6)
- Gigi Barocco (Luigi Barone) – mastering, mixing (tracks 2, 4–5, 9–10; track 11 of the digital reissue)
- Giordano Cremona – programming, production (tracks 7–8)
- Leonardo "Wolvs" Grillotti – programming (track 8), production (tracks 7–8)
- Luca "Shune" Ghiazzi – programming, production, recording (tracks 10)
- Michele "Giotto" Bargigia – keyboards (track 11 on the digital reissue)
- Nicola "Cripo" Lazzarin – programming, production, recording (track 5)
- Riccardo Scirè – programming, production, recording (tracks 9)

== Charts ==
Chart performance for Met Gala
Chart (2025)	Peak position
Italian Albums (FIMI)	6

== Certifications ==
Region	Certification	Certified units/sales
Italy (FIMI)	Gold	25,000^{‡}
^{‡} Sales+streaming figures based on certification alone.
