= Billboard Italia Women in Music =

Italian music award

- Awarded for: Contributions to the Italian music industry by women
- Sponsored by: SIAE, La Rinascente, Rabanne, Radio 105
- Location: Milan, Italy
- Country: Italy
- Presented by: Billboard Italia
- First award: 2024
- Website: https://billboard.it/tag/women-in-music/

Billboard Italia Women in Music is an annual event by Billboard Italia. The Italian edition of Billboard Women in Music event, it would "honor the most influential women in Italian music," according to the magazine. Like its American counterpart, the main award is titled Woman of the Year. The inaugural ceremony was held on September 16, 2024.

== History ==
After the first edition of the Billboard Women in Music in 2007, the awards were given to artists from every nationality who gained achievements in the magazine's charts. In 2023 the publication launched the first international award outside the United States, the Billboard Latin Women in Music, specifically for Latin music. In 2024 Billboard Women in Music introduced the Global Force Award, given to "singers, songwriters, instrumentalists and producers making groundbreaking contributions to the music industry" selected by Billboard publication around the world, including Annalisa selected by Billboard Italia. Since that Billboard extended the Women in Music ceremony to the individual international territories in which the magazine is published, including Billboard Italia.

== Woman of the Year ==
- 2024: Anna
- 2025: Giorgia
- 2026: Madame

== Icon Award ==
Billboard Italia Icon Award is given to "an Italian female artist of extraordinary accomplishment, who has made historic contributions to the industry and artistry".

- 2024: Laura Pausini
- 2026: Loredana Bertè

== Global Award ==
- 2025: Laura Pausini

== Impact Award ==
- 2024: Rose Villain
- 2026: Elisa

== Performer of the Year ==
- 2024: Elodie
- 2025: Emma Nolde

== Hitmaker of the Year ==
- 2024: Gaia

== Powehouse Award ==
- 2025: Serena Brancale
- 2026: Ditonellapiaga

== Breakthrough Award ==
- 2024: BigMama
- 2025: Ele A

== Rising Star Award ==
- 2024: Clara
- 2024: Sarah Toscano
- 2026: Angelica Bove

== DJ of The Year ==
- 2024: Anfisa Letyago
- 2025: Deborah De Luca

== Songwriter of the Year ==
- 2024: Federica Abbate
- 2025: Joan Thiele
- 2026: Francesca Michielin

== Producer of the Year ==
- 2024: Marta Salogni

== Manager of the Year ==
- 2024: Marta Donà
- 2025: Paola Zukar

== A&R of the Year ==
- 2024: Sara Potente

== Stylist of the Year ==
- 2024: Ramona Tabita

== See also ==
- Billboard Women in Music
