= Andrea Arru =

Italian actor (born 2007)

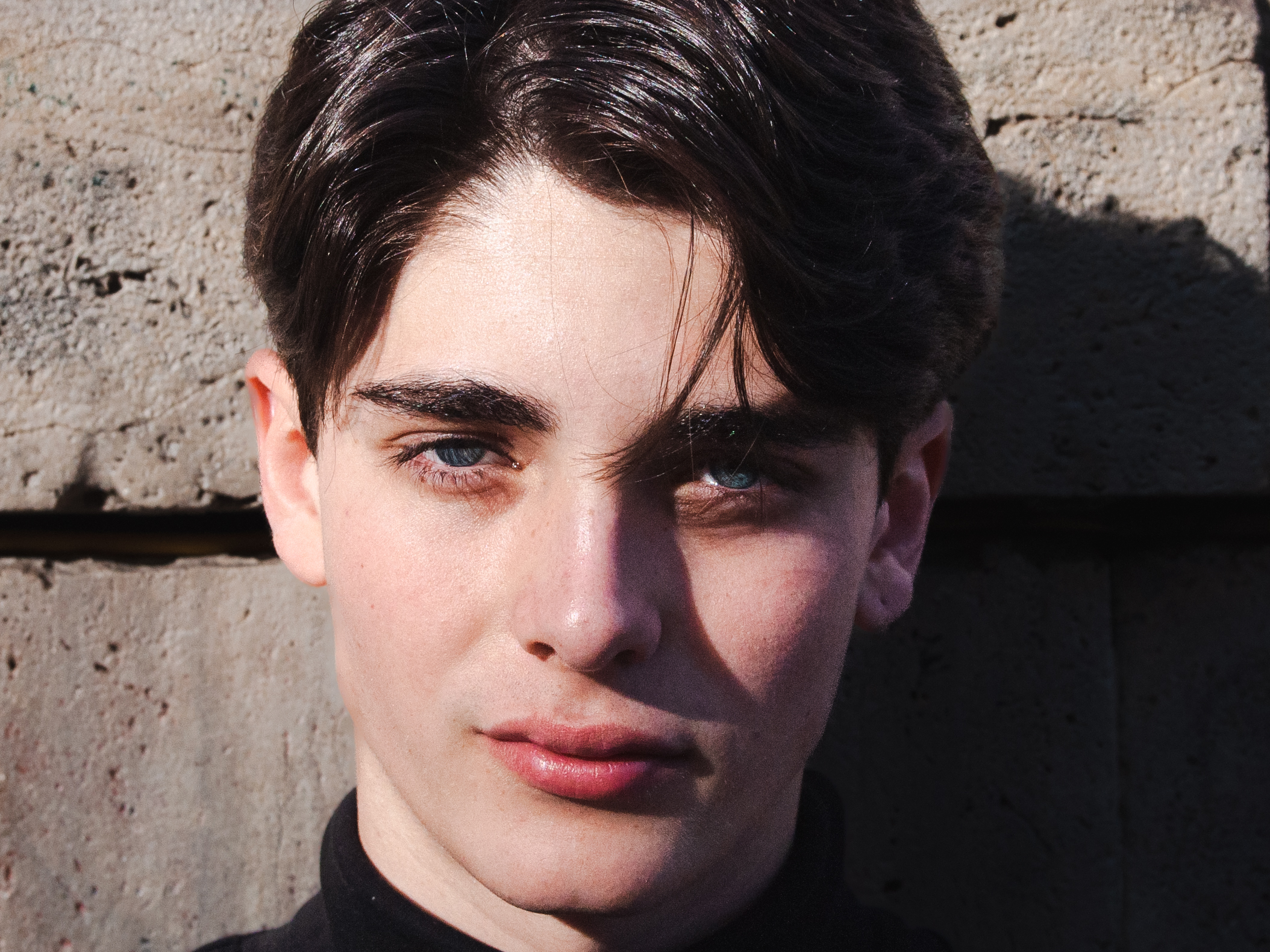
- Arru in 2023
- Born: 18 August 2007 (age 18); Ploaghe, Sardinia, Italy
- Occupations: Actor; model
- Years active: 2020–present

Andrea Arru (born 18 August 2007) is an Italian actor and model. He is best known for playing Pietro Maggi in the teen drama series Di4ries (2022–2023) and young Diabolik in the crime action film Diabolik: Who Are You? (2023).

== Biography ==
Arru was born in Ploaghe, Sardinia, to Roberto Arru and Daniela Usai. He has an older brother, Giacomo. He attended a liceo scientifico. As a child, he modeled for Ferrè and Armani, which led to him being recruited to act in a short film by the Scuola Civica di Cinema di Sassari, marking his entry into the acting world.

== Filmography ==
=== Film ===
Year	Title	Role	Notes	Ref.
2020	Lo scarabocchio	Andrea	Short film	
2020	Resurrection - The Last Chapter	Ghost	Short film	
2020	Glassboy	Pino		
2020	Caliber 9	Police officer's son		
2023	Diabolik: Who Are You?	Young Diabolik		
2023	Eravamo bambini	Young Walter		
2024	101%	Riccardo	Short film	
2024	The Boy with Pink Pants	Christian Todi		
2024	Il migliore dei mali	Neri		
TBA	Piercing			

=== Television ===
Year	Title	Role	Notes	Ref.
2020	Buongiorno, mamma!	Guido	1 episode	
2021	Storia di una famiglia perbene	Michele Straziota	8 episodes	
2022	That Dirty Black Bag	Young McCoy	1 episode	
2022–2023	Di4ries	Pietro Maggi	Main role; 29 episodes	
2025	Riv4lries	Pietro Maggi	4 episodes	
2026	I Cesaroni – Il ritorno	Olmo		
