= Anfisa Letyago =

Russian-born DJ and music producer (born 1990)

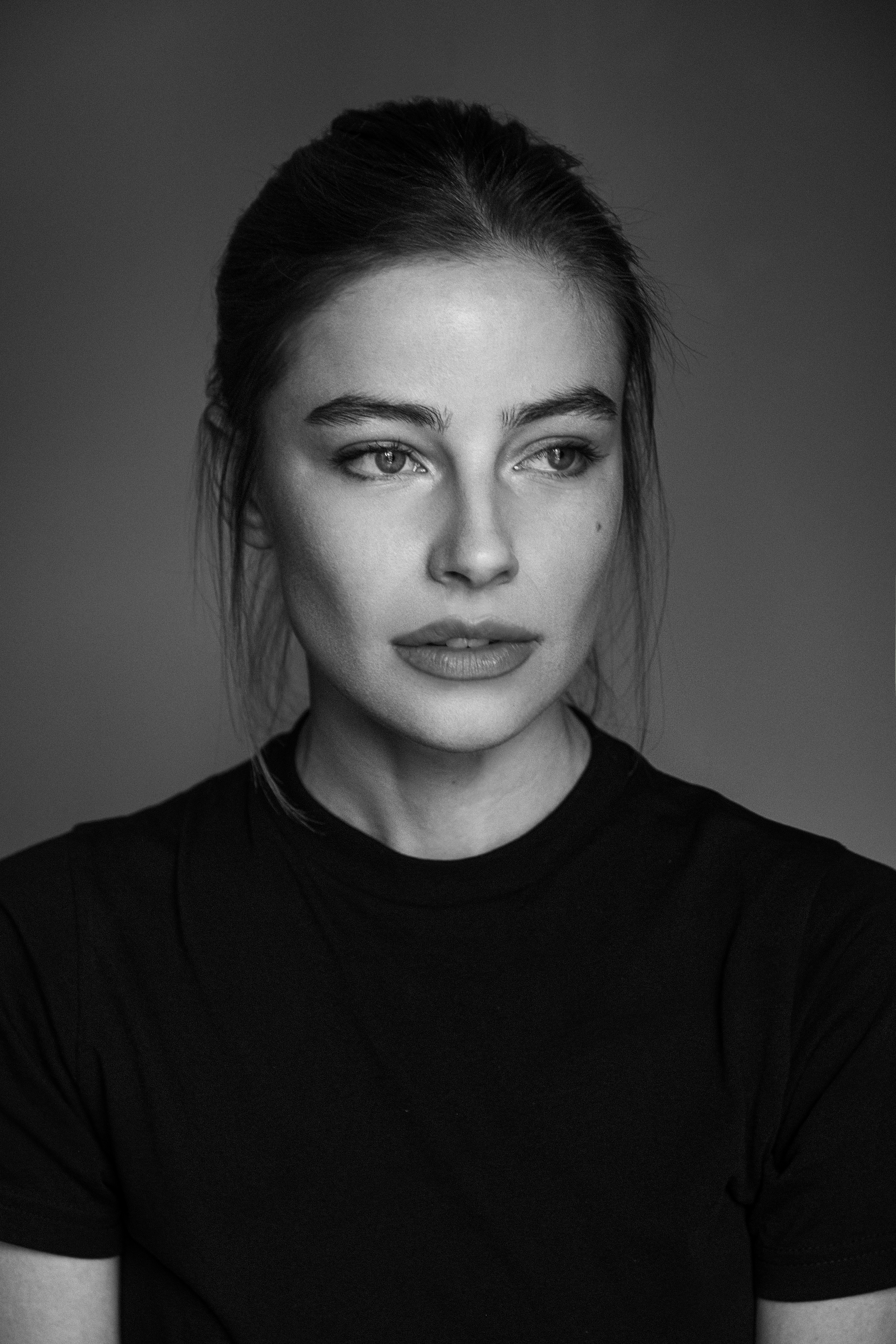
- Letyago in 2021

Background information
- Born: 5 March 1990 (age 36); Mirny, Yakut ASSR (now Sakha Republic), Russian SFSR, Soviet Union
- Origin: Russia/Italy
- Genres: Techno
- Occupations: Record producer, DJ
- Years active: 2009–present
- Label: noted. records

Instagram information
- Page: Anfisa Letyago
- Followers: 1.4 million (11 August 2026)

Anfisa Letyago (born 5th March 1990) is a Russian-born techno DJ and record producer based in Naples, Italy. Letyago has achieved recognition as a techno DJ, including being nominated as "DJ of the Year" at the Billboard Italia Women in Music awards.

== Career ==
Letyago was born in 1990 in Mirny in the far north of Siberia, Russia, and has an Italian father. Her family has been based in Naples since c. 2002 and she began her DJ career there in 2009. Her break came about after meeting DJ Carl Cox in 2018, who began playing her records. Letyago styles her music as "groovy techno". In 2019 she started the N:S:DA record label.

In 2022 Letyago was featured in music magazine Mixmag, including providing an "energising" cover mix. Later in 2022 Letyago released the track "Rosso Profondo" with some controversy due to an accusation of plagiarism, which she denied. Letyago has been featured several times on BBC Radio 1, including hosting the Residency show, and in April 2023 she produced her debut for the essential mix. In 2024 Letyago was signed to a subsidiary label of Sony Music, "noted. records".

=== Awards ===
In 2024 Letyago was named "DJ of the Year" at the Billboard Italia Women in Music awards.

== Discography ==
=== Singles ===
- Rosso Profondo (2019)
- Hypnotic (2019, Intec Digital)
- Haze (2022, NSDA)
- You & Me (2024, Defected), with Moby
- Feelin' (2024, noted. records)
- Origami (2024, noted. records)

=== EPs ===
- I Feel (2018, Natura Viva)
- So Good (2019, Intec Digital)
- Hypnotic (2019, Intec Digital)
- Bright Lights (2019, Nervous)
- Electrifying (2020, Hotflush Records)
- Listen (2021, NSDA)
- Nisida (2021, NSDA)
- Bubbledance (2025, noted. records)
