= The Boy with Pink Pants =

2024 film by Margherita Ferri

- Theatrical release poster
- Italian: Il ragazzo dai pantaloni rosa
- Directed by: Margherita Ferri
- Screenplay by: Roberto Proia
- Produced by: Roberto Proia
- Starring: Claudia Pandolfi; Samuele Carrino; Sara Ciocca; Andrea Arru; Corrado Fortuna
- Cinematography: Martina Cocco
- Edited by: Mauro Rossi
- Music by: Francesco Cerasi
- Production companies: Eagle Pictures; Weekend Films
- Distributed by: Eagle Pictures
- Release dates: 24 October 2024 (Rome); 7 November 2024 (Italy)
- Running time: 115 minutes
- Country: Italy
- Language: Italian
- Box office: €10 million

The Boy with Pink Pants (Italian: Il ragazzo dai pantaloni rosa, also known as The Boy with Pink Trousers) is a 2024 Italian drama film directed by Margherita Ferri, starring Claudia Pandolfi and Samuele Carrino.

== Plot ==
Andrea Spezzacatena is a teenager who lives with his parents, Teresa and Tommaso, and his younger brother, Daniele. Thanks to his singing talent, he is invited to audition for a papal choir, in which he is accepted. There, he is struck by Christian Todi, a student who has repeated a year and with whom he finds himself sharing a class at the beginning of the eighth grade. Andrea befriends a classmate, Sara, and also manages to become friends with Christian by helping him with his studies. However, Christian distances himself from him when only Andrea is chosen among the young singers selected to perform for the Pope.

Andrea suffers a heavy blow when his parents announce their decision to divorce. Christian seemingly gets closer to him again, prompting Andrea to confide in him about his distress, as well as the fact that, because of it, he has wet the bed in his sleep. However, Christian reveals this to their class. When Andrea enters the classroom, he finds a drawing on the blackboard depicting him with a wet bed, while the whole class laughs and mocks him.

In his first year of high school, Andrea is troubled to discover that he will be sharing a class not only with Sara but also with Christian, who once again seems to act friendly toward him. One day, Andrea's mother, Teresa, buys him a pair of red pants, which turn pink after being washed. He wears them anyway with great enthusiasm, but this makes him the target of various taunts from his classmates.

For Valentine's Day, Andrea goes out with Sara and kisses her, confessing that he is in love with her. When she explains that she does not return his feelings, Andrea bitterly reminds her of her previous unrequited crush on Christian, leading her to cut ties with him. Andrea resumes hanging out with Christian and his group, despite Sara's warnings not to do so. He starts practicing athletics with Christian's group and, after helping them win a competition, they reveal their plan for a prank they want to pull off.

For the end-of-year party, Christian suggests that Andrea join him and his friends in a prank, which involves crashing the dance dressed “as prostitutes.” Andrea shows up at the event fully dressed and made up for the occasion, even with his mother's help, but once there, he realizes he has been deceived and is the only one in costume. Christian and his group attack him in the bathroom and drag him in front of everyone, humiliating him publicly and forcing him to leave the party in tears.

At school, his performance worsens more and more.

During the summer, Andrea becomes increasingly withdrawn: he has been required to retake exams in September and has narrowly avoided failing the year. He discovers that his classmates have created a Facebook group dedicated to mocking and insulting him for his presumed homosexuality and gender-nonconforming behavior. When school resumes, Andrea paints his nails and starts a fight with Christian, confronting him about the public shaming he has suffered.

Resigned to the idea that he will be subjected to his classmates' cruelty for the rest of his school years, Andrea decides to take his own life. Before doing so, he reconciles with Sara, kissing her and saying goodbye before she leaves for Paris, and celebrates his fifteenth and final birthday at the fair with his family.

After Andrea's death, Teresa, devastated by grief, writes a book titled Andrea: Beyond the Pink Pants, which she dedicates to her two sons.

The final titles reveal that after her son's suicide, Teresa accessed his Facebook account, discovering the cyberbullying he had endured and which had driven him to take his own life. She dedicates the rest of her life to raising awareness among young people about the dangers of cyberbullying.

== Cast ==
- Samuele Carrino as Andrea Spezzacatena
- Claudia Pandolfi as Teresa Manes
- Sara Ciocca as Sara
- Corrado Fortuna as Tommaso Spezzacatena
- Andrea Arru as Christian Todi
- Pietro Serpi as Daniele Spezzacatena
- Barbara Bovoli as Ostetrica
- Settimo Palazzo as prof. Gioli

== Production ==
The film is a dramatization of the real-life story of Andrea Spezzacatena, a 15-year-old boy from Rome who killed himself in 2012 after being subject to cyberbullying, and is based on the autobiographical novel of his mother, Teresa Manes. The film was produced by Eagle Pictures and Weekend Films. The director and the cast presented a teaser of the film and discussed the project at the 55th Giffoni Film Festival.

== Soundtrack ==
The main theme "Canta ancora" is performed by Arisa. It was awarded as Best Original Song at the Nastro d'Argento and the Filming Italy Los Angeles festival in 2025.

== Release ==
The Boy with Pink Pants premiered at the 19th Rome Film Festival. It was also screened at the Tallinn Black Nights Film Festival. The film was released in Italian cinemas on 7 November 2024 by Eagle Pictures.

== Reception ==
In spite of its low budget and lack of marketing, the film was a surprise hit at the domestic box office, turning out to be the best-grossing Italian film of 2024.
