= Kaos India =

Italian rock band

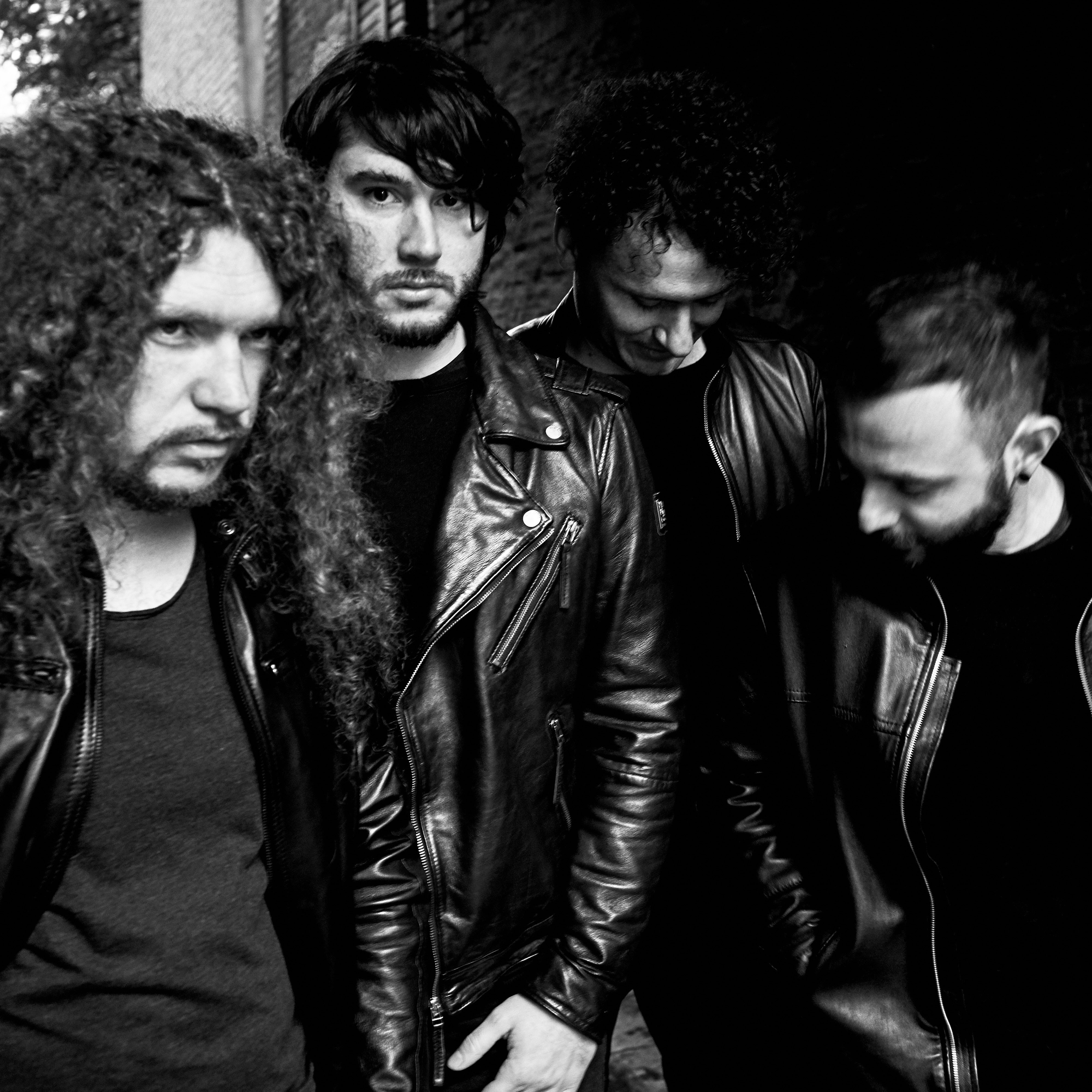
- Kaos India, March 2018

Background information
- Origin: Modena, Emilia Romagna, Italy
- Genres: Indie rock, Alternative rock
- Years active: 2011–present
- Labels: Universal; VREC
- Members: Matt Camurri; Fresh Sireno; Joe Schiaffi; Vince Moreo
- Website: kaosindia.com

Kaos India is an Italian indie alternative rock band born in 2011 in Modena. They shared the stage with some names of the Italian and international alternative scene such as Placebo, Gomma, The Bastard Sons of Dioniso, Rumatera, Giorginess, Alteria.The group is a quartet composed of Matt Camurri, Fresh Sireno, Joe Schiaffi and Vince Moreo. They debut with the homonymous EP Kaos IndiA in December 2011, recorded at the Bizzarri Studio in Modena in collaboration with Dario Casillo (sound engineer of Umberto Tozzi, former Samuele Bersani). After the tour of promotion of the first EP, the group publishes in 2014 the debut album The Distance Between.

In the summer of 2015 they publish the mini-EP Stay, followed by 2 years of intense concert activity.

In February 2017 they meet the producer Pietro Foresti and after a short period of pre-production begin the recording sessions of the new album at the Overstudio of Pieve di Cento.

On 11 May 2018 the single "Half" is released . The group continues to perform live. On 8 November 2018 the video of the single "Don't Stop" was released on Vevo, a preview for Billboard Italia. The second album Wave was released in digital format on 2 February 2019, released by Universal Music Italia in advance of the single "Who Needs Who" and its lyrics video.

== Influences ==
Among the most important influences mentioned by the group there are bands like Arctic Monkeys, The Cure, Kings of Leon, The Black Keys, U2, Editors, Radiohead, The Smiths, Oasis.

== Band members ==
- Matt Camurri: lead vocals, guitar (2011–present)
- Fresh: lead guitar (2011–present)
- Joe Schiaffi: drums (2011–present)
- Vince Moreo: bass guitar (2011–present)

== Discography ==
=== Extended Play ===
- Kaos IndiA (2011)
- Stay (2015)

=== Studio albums ===
- The Distance Between (2014)
- Wave (2019)

=== Singles ===
- 2015 – Stay
- 2018 – Half
- 2018 – Don't Stop
- 2018 – Who Needs Who
- 2018 – A Second
