= Perfect (Carl Brave song) =

Single by Carl Brave featuring Sarah Toscano

from the album Notti brave amarcord
- Released: 25 April 2025
- Genre: Pop; urban
- Length: 3:13
- Label: Warner Music Italy
- Songwriters: Carlo Luigi Coraggio; Sarah Toscano
- Producer: Carl Brave

Carl Brave singles chronology
"Morto a galla" (2025)	"Perfect" (2025)	"Occhiaie" (2025)

Sarah Toscano singles chronology
"Amarcord" (2025)	"Perfect" (2025)	"Taki" (2025)

Music video
- "Perfect" on YouTube

"Perfect" is a song written, recorded and produced by Italian singer-songwriter Carl Brave with featured guest vocals by Italian singer-songwriter Sarah Toscano. It was released on 25 April 2025 by Warner Music Italy as the lead single from Carl Brave's digital reissue of his fourth studio album, Notti brave amarcord.

== Description ==
The song, written by both artists, is produced by Carl Brave himself and tells of an imperfect love, where beauty does not lie in the absence of problems, but in sharing daily difficulties and in the desire to make everything special. This is the first collaboration between the two artists: a fusion of two different musical styles between pop and urban, which in reality are perfectly complementary.

== Promotion ==
The release of the song was revealed by both artists a few days before the release of the song, while the day before the release, on 24 April 2025, they revealed a piece of the song through their social profiles. On the same day they performed a preview of the song at the Terrazza del Pincio in Rome, during the concert and signing of the album Notti brave amarcord by Carl Brave. On May 1, the artists performed the song for the first time live at the Concerto del Primo Maggio in Piazza San Giovanni in Laterano in Rome. On May 18, the artists performed the song during the ninth final episode of the evening of the twenty-fourth edition of the talent show Amici di Maria De Filippi.

== Music video ==
The music video for "Perfect", directed by Maurizio Zanieri, was released on the same day via Carl Brave's YouTube channel and was recorded the day before the song's release, on 24 April 2025, during their performance at the Terrazza del Pincio.

== Charts ==
Weekly chart performance for "Perfect"
Chart (2025)	Peak position
Italy (FIMI)	62
Italy Airplay (EarOne)	20
