= Sarah (EP) =

EP by Sarah Toscano
- Released: 17 May 2024
- Genre: Teen pop
- Length: 14:59
- Language: Italian
- Label: Warner Music Italy
- Producer: Danusk; Etta; Eugenio Valente; Katoo; Michele Canova Iorfida; Room9

Sarah Toscano chronology
Riflesso (2022)	Sarah (2024)

Singles from Sarah
- 1. "Touché" Released: 7 November 2023; 2. "Viole e violini" Released: 12 December 2023; 3. "Mappamondo" Released: 5 March 2024; 4. "Sexy magica" Released: 30 April 2024; 5. "Roulette" Released: 26 July 2024

Sarah is the second extended play by Italian singer-songwriter Sarah Toscano. It was released on 17 May 2024 by Warner Music Italy.

== Description ==
The standard edition of the album, consisting of six tracks and produced by Danusk, Etta, Eugenio Valente, Francesco "Katoo" Catitti, Michele Canova Iorfida and Room9, was released during Sarah's participation in the twenty-third edition of the talent show Amici di Maria De Filippi. Subsequently, on 26 July 2024, the album was re-adapted for a streaming re-release with the addition of the single "Roulette".

== Promotion ==
To promote the album, the singer-songwriter embarked a promotional tour, performing during the summer at various music festivals and in Italian and European clubs: from 20 May to 16 June, for twelve dates, the Instore tour took place, while from 15 June to 28 August the Sarah Live Summer 2024 took place from Rome to Monterosso al Mare (LS).

== Track listing ==
Sarah – Standard track listing
No.	Title	Writer(s)	Producer(s)	Length
1.	"Sexy magica"	Sarah Toscano; Giampiero Gentile; Raffaele Esposito	Room9	2:39
2.	"Touché"	Toscano; Emanuele Cotto; Viviana Colombo	Etta	2:12
3.	"Viole e violini"	Toscano; Leonardo Zaccaria; Michele Canova; Vincenzo Colella	Canova	2:51
4.	"Mappamondo"	Federica Abbate; Alex Andrea Vella; Francesco Catitti; Antonio Maiello	Katoo; Room9	2:48
5.	"L'ultima volta"	Toscano; Emanuela Caricchia; Francesco Sponta; Daniele Autore; Cotto	Danusk; Etta	2:45
6.	"Voilà" (Live)	Barbara Pravi; Antoine Barrau; Lil Poe	Eugenio Valente	1:44

Sarah – Streaming reissue bonus track
No.	Title	Writer(s)	Producer(s)	Length
1.	"Roulette"	Esposito; Gentile	Room9	2:50

== Charts ==
Chart performance for Sarah
Chart (2024)	Peak position
Italian Albums (FIMI)	12
