= Semplicemente (Sarah Toscano and Mida song) =

Single by Sarah Toscano and Mida

from the album Met Gala
- Released: 12 September 2025
- Genre: Pop; power ballad
- Length: 3:07
- Label: Warner Music Italy
- Songwriters: Sarah Toscano; Christian Prestato; Gianmarco Grande; Tommaso Santoni
- Producer: GRND

Sarah Toscano singles chronology
| "Taki" (2025) | "Semplicemente" (2025) | "Maledetto ti amo" (2025) |

Mida singles chronology
| "Bad Boys Don't Cry" (2025) | "Semplicemente" (2025) | "Canzone d'amore" (2026) |

Music video
- "Semplicemente" on YouTube

"Semplicemente" (transl. Simply) is a song written and recorded by Italian singer-songwriters Sarah Toscano and Mida. It was released on 12 September 2025 by Warner Music Italy as the fourth single from Sarah Toscano's debut studio album, Met Gala.

== Description ==
The song, a dreamy and intimate power ballad written by both artists with Tommaso Santoni, aka Rondine, was produced by Gianmarco Grande, aka GRND, and tells a "simple" story of a young and fragile love, marked by contradictions. This is the first official collaboration between the two artists, both alumni of the twenty-third edition of the talent show Amici di Maria De Filippi.

== Promotion ==
On 2 September 2025 the artists premiered the song at the Future Hits Live event at the Verona Arena. That same evening, the singer-songwriter shared a teaser video for her next project, Met Gala, her debut album, on her Instagram profile, accompanied by the phrase "I'll shine like at the Met Gala". On 9 September the singer-songwriter shared a spoiler video on her TikTok profile, titled "Semplicemente (from the Netflix series "RIV4LI")", in which she revealed that the song was written for the soundtrack and theme song of the youth series Riv4lries, available on Netflix from 1 October.

On 10 September 2025 the artists then revealed the song's release date on their social media profiles: 12 September. Initially released only on digital platforms, the song was also made available for radio rotation from 26 September. On 5 October the artists performed the song during the second episode of the afternoon of the twenty-fifth edition of the talent show Amici di Maria De Filippi.

== Music video ==
The music video for "Semplicemente", directed by Amedeo Zancanella, was released on the same day via Sarah Toscano's YouTube channel.

== Charts ==
Weekly chart performance for "Semplicemente"
| Chart (2025) | Peak position |
|---|---|
| Italy (FIMI) | 46 |
| Italy Airplay (EarOne) | 48 |
