= Taki (song) =

Single by Sarah Toscano

from the album Met Gala
- Released: 23 May 2025
- Genre: Pop; afrobeats
- Length: 2:33
- Label: Warner Music Italy
- Songwriters: Sarah Toscano; Alessandro La Cava; Federica Abbate; Nicola Lazzarin
- Producer: Cripo

Sarah Toscano singles chronology
"Perfect" (2025)	"Taki" (2025)	"Semplicemente" (2025)

Music video
- "Taki" on YouTube

"Taki" is a song co-written and recorded by Italian singer-songwriter Sarah Toscano. It was released on 23 May 2025 by Warner Music Italy as the third single from her debut studio album, Met Gala.

== Description ==
The song, written by the singer-songwriter herself with Alessandro La Cava and Federica Abbate, is produced by Nicola Lazzarin, aka Cripo, and its sound combines a pop soul with Afro influences, evoking the energy of nature. Inspired by Japanese philosophy, whose title "Taki" means "waterfall", the song tells a moment of inner rupture and awareness in an intense and pure love story, where the water of the waterfall, which slides slowly, represents the delicacy and intensity of a deep emotional connection.

== Promotion ==
On May 18, 2025, the singer-songwriter performed the song as a preview during the ninth final episode of the evening of the twenty-fourth edition of the talent show Amici di Maria De Filippi. Initially distributed only on digital platforms, the song was also made available for radio rotation on July 11th.

== Music video ==
The music video for "Taki", directed by Byron Rosero, was released on the same day via Sarah Toscano's YouTube channel.

== Charts ==
Weekly chart performance for "Taki"
Chart (2025)	Peak position
Italy (FIMI)	82
Italy Airplay (EarOne)	81
