= Sarah Toscano =

Italian singer-songwriter and actress (born 2006)

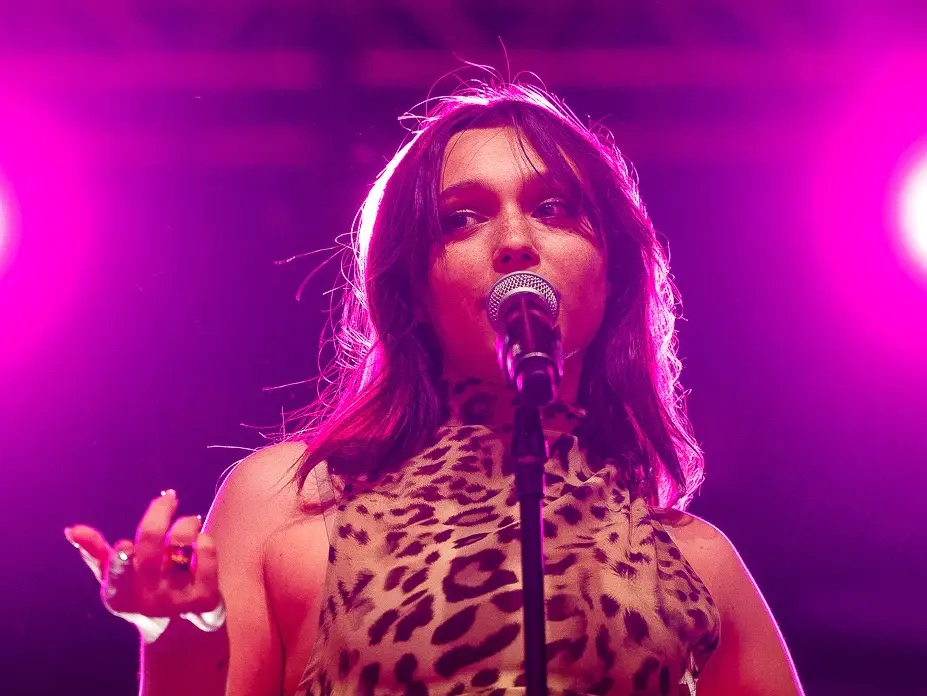
- Sarah Toscano in concert at the Mov Summer Festival in Mondovì (CN), 31 July 2025.

Background information
- Born: 9 January 2006 (age 20); Vigevano, Lombardy, Italy
- Origin: Milan, Lombardy, Italy
- Genres: Pop; dance-pop
- Occupations: Singer; songwriter; actress
- Instruments: Vocals; piano
- Works: Discography
- Years active: 2022–present
- Labels: Universal (2022–2023); Warner (2023–present)

Logo

Sarah Toscano (born 9 January 2006) is an Italian singer-songwriter and actress. She rose to prominence in 2024, after winning the twenty-third edition of the talent show Amici di Maria De Filippi.

== Early life and education ==
Raised in the Pavia area together with her sister Giulia, a lawyer and entrepreneur at the head of a company who later became her manager, and her brother Lorenzo, she is the third child of Petra Polomsky, a German teacher originally from Stuttgart, Germany, and Marco Toscano, an entrepreneur in the leather sector.

At the age of four, she began studying piano. During her childhood, Toscano was musically influenced by international pop music artists such as Ariana Grande, Avril Lavigne, Britney Spears, Demi Lovato, Dua Lipa, Katy Perry, Lady Gaga, Olivia Rodrigo, Rihanna, Sabrina Carpenter, Tate McRae and Taylor Swift, as well as Italian artists including Annalisa, Chiara Galiazzo, Emma, Mina, Lucio Dalla, Tananai and Ultimo. Her works draw from the pop and dance-pop genres.

Passionate about tennis since she was a child, in 2020 she played in the women's C series, and in 2023 she decided to abandon her tennis career to devote herself to music. She attended the "Vittorio Bachelet" High School in Abbiategrasso, Milan, but interrupted her studies in her final year to participate in the television show Amici di Maria De Filippi.

== Career ==
=== 2022: Area Sanremo and Riflesso ===
In 2022, her father introduced her to music manager Andrea Dulio, who arranged for her to record her first songs in a studio with producer Pietro Foresti. Toscano was selected as one of the twenty finalists in the Area Sanremo singing competition, one of the selections for newcomers to take part in the Sanremo Music Festival 2023. Although she was not chosen as a competitor for Sanremo Giovani, she won the plaque dedicated to Vittorio De Scalzi.

On 21 October 2022, Toscano's debut EP, Riflesso, was released. Distributed by Universal, it featured six tracks, including her first single, "9 giugno", released on that very date.

=== 2023–2024: victory at Amici 23 and Sarah ===
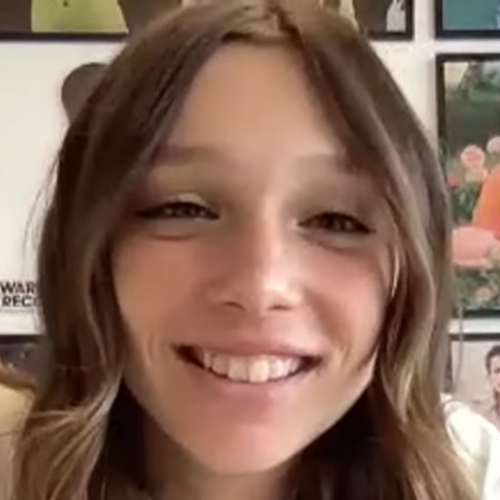
Sarah Toscano interviewed in June 2024

In September 2023, Toscano auditioned for the 23rd edition of Amici di Maria De Filippi, the musical talent show broadcast on Canale 5, successfully entering the initial phase. In March 2024, she advanced to the evening phase, joining the team led by coaches Lorella Cuccarini and Emanuel Lo. The following May, she reached the final and emerged as the winner.

During the show – with the name of "Sarah" alone – she released several songs, including the single Touché", "Viole e violini", "Mappamondo" and "Sexy magica", which reached number 83 on the FIMI singles chart. All songs were later included in her EP of the same name, released on 17 May 2024, by Warner, debuting at number 12 on the FIMI albums chart.

From 15 June to 28 August 2024, Toscano embarked on her first summer tour, "Sarah Live Summer 2024". That summer, she also appeared at major music events, including RDS Summer Festival, Battiti Live, and 105 Summer Festival. On 16 July, she opened for the Black Eyed Peas in Milan. On 26 July, she released the single "Roulette", included in the streaming re-issue of her self-titled EP. In August, Apple Music named her the "Up Next Italia" artist, an initiative promoting emerging talents, which she celebrated with a performance at the amphitheater in Piazza del Liberty, Milan, on 12 September.

On 29 September 2024, during the first episode of the 24th edition of Amici, she previewed her new single "Tacchi (fra le dita)", set for release on 4 October. In November, she collaborated with British singer-songwriter Bea and her Business on the Italian version of "Safety Net".

=== 2025–2026: Sanremo Music Festival 2025 and Met Gala ===
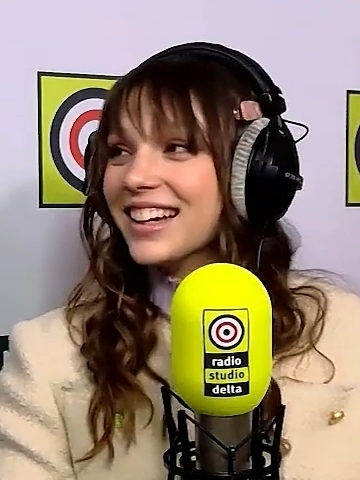
Sarah Toscano interviewed in February 2025

Toscano competed in the Sanremo Music Festival 2025 with the song "Amarcord". She placed 17th in the contest, and the song reached number 19 in the FIMI chart; he was then certified gold. On 14 February, on the fourth evening dedicated to covers, she dueted with the French musical duo Ofenbach singing the song "Overdrive", ranked fourteenth.

In February 2025 she became the face of the fashion brand Ragno and for the Ghd Chronos Max advertising campagna, as well as having collaborated with the brands Horda, Adidas, YSL Beauty and H&M. On 12 March she opened for Ofenbach in Milan. On 16 March together with the dancer Marisol Castellanos, she returned to Amici to present Amici – Verso il serale, a special episode in which she told her experience within the talent show to the contestants of the twenty-fourth edition, promoted to the evening phase of the program.

In April 2025 Forbes Italia magazine included her among the Italian under-30s who will have the greatest impact in the future for the entertainment category. That same month, she featured in Carl Brave's single "Perfect". On 18 May, during the final of the 24th edition of Amici, she premiered her new single "Taki", released on 23 May.

From 6 June to 20 September, the "Sarah Toscano Summer tour 2025" took place, her summer tour in twenty-four dates from Bologna to Castelguelfo (BO). On 12 September 2025, the single "Semplicemente" with Mida was released, premiering live on 2 September at Future Hits Live at the Verona Arena. The song was part of the soundtrack and theme song of the Netflix series Riv4lries.

On 3 October 2025 she released her first studio album Met Gala, inspired by the charity event of the same name that takes place annually at the Costume Institute of the Metropolitan Museum of Art in New York City. Anticipated by the singles "Tacchi (fra le dita)", "Amarcord", "Taki" and "Semplicemente, the album also contains six unreleased tracks, including the "title track", "Desco", "Dopo di te", "Caos", "Match Point" and "Maledetto ti amo", performed in live preview on 13 August during the Red Valley Festival in Olbia (SS).

On 18 and 25 October 2025, the "Sarah Toscano Live 2025" took place, two live concerts in clubs: the first at the Magazzini Generali in Milan, while the second at the Largo Venue in Rome, both of which sold out. On 26 November she won the Rising Star award at the Billboard Italia Women in Music, held at the UFO Milano event space. On 28 November the song "Maledetto ti amo" was made available as a single for radio rotation.

On 3 April 2026 the film Feel My Voice directed by Luca Ribuoli, a remake of the French film La Famille Bélier (2014), in which Toscano made her debut as a leading actress in the role of Eletta Musso, was released on Netflix. On the same day, the single "Atlantide", made for the soundtrack of the film and included in the digital re-release of his debut album. From 9 to 23 May the "Met Gala tour 2026" took place for seven dates from Molfetta (BA) to Milan. In the same month, she paraded for the first time at the 79th edition of the Cannes Film Festival.

On 29 May 2026 Federica Abbate's single "Superman" was released, in which Sarah appeared in the video as a bridesmaid alongside Clara. The next day she received the Best Movie Awards for Best Actress for her film debut in the film Feel My Voice, an event held at the Multisala Gloria Notorious Cinemas in Milan. She was subsequently nominated for Best Actress in a TV movie at the twelfth edition of the Italian Global Series Festival.

The "Sarah Toscano Summer tour 2026" took place from 1 June to 12 September 2026 with seventeen dates from Lecco to Cento (FE). On 13 June she participated in the 72nd edition of the Taormina Film Fest, held at the Ancient theatre of Taormina, where she received the Best Music Award. On 3 July he received the Taurus Award during the second evening of the fourth edition of the Outdoor Film Festival, held in San Valentino Torio (SA). On 22 July she participated in the 56th edition of the Giffoni Film Festival, where he received the Explosive Talent Award. On 18 September she performed during the first evening of the twentieth edition of the BYD Music Awards at the Verona Arena, in which she was awarded the gold record of her first album.

=== 2026–present: new projects ===
On 23 October 2026 Chris Nolan's album La tavola dell'umore was released, in which Sarah collaborated on the track "Ombre" together with Carl Brave and Giuse The Lizia. On 6 November she released the single "Affinché nessuno ci cancelli".

== Discography ==
- Met Gala (2025)

== Tours ==
- 2024 – Sarah Live Summer 2024
- 2025 – Sarah Toscano Summer tour 2025
- 2025 – Sarah Toscano Live 2025
- 2026 – Met Gala tour 2026
- 2026 – Sarah Toscano Summer tour 2026

== Television programs ==
Year	Title	Network	Role(s)	Notes
2023–2024	Amici di Maria De Filippi	Canale 5	Herself / Contestant	Talent show (season 23) – Winner
2024–2025	This Is Me	Canale 5	Herself / Guest	Talent show
2025	Amici – Verso il serale	Canale 5	Herself / Co-host	Pre-final stage special of Amici di Maria De Filippi (season 24)
2025	Foodish	TV8	Herself / Judge	Reality show (episode 23, season 2)
2026	Alessandro Borghese – Celebrity Chef	TV8	Herself / Contestant	Reality show (episode 18, season 5) – Winner

== Participation in singing events ==
- Area Sanremo
  - 2022 – Not selected for Sanremo Giovani
- Sanremo Music Festival (Rai 1)
  - 2025 – 17th place Big Artists section with "Amarcord"

== Filmography ==
=== Film ===
Year	Title	Role(s)	Notes
2026	Feel My Voice	Eletta Musso	Netflix film

=== Music videos ===
Year	Title	Artist(s)	Role(s)
2026	"Superman"	Federica Abbate	Bridesmaid

== Commercials ==
- Horda (2024–2025)
- Adidas (2025)
- YSL Beauty (2025–2026)
- Ragno (2025)
- Ghd Chronos Max (2025–2026)
- H&M (2025)

== Awards and nominations ==
Year	Award	Nomination	Work	Result	Notes
2022	Area Sanremo	Vittorio De Scalzi plaque	Herself	Won	
2024	Amici di Maria De Filippi	First place in the Singing category (season 23)	Herself	Won	
2024	Apple Music	Artist "Up Next Italia" (at portal of emerging talents)	Herself	Won	
2025	Forbes Italia	Inclusion among the Italian under-30s with the greatest impact in the future in the "Entertainment" category	Herself	Won	
2025	Billboard Italia Women in Music	Rising Star	Herself	Won	
2026	Best Movie Awards	Best Actress	Feel My Voice	Won	
2026	Italian Global Series Festival	Best Actress in a TV movie	Feel My Voice	Nominated	
2026	Taormina Film Fest	Best Music Award	Herself	Won	
2026	Outdoor Film Festival	Taurus Award	Herself	Won	
2026	Giffoni Film Festival	Explosive Talent Award	Herself	Won	
2026	Music Awards	Gold disc Award	Met Gala	Won	
