= Sexy magica =

Single by Sarah Toscano

from the EP Sarah
- Released: 30 April 2024
- Genre: Dance-pop
- Length: 2:39
- Label: Warner Music Italy
- Songwriters: Sarah Toscano; Giampiero Gentile; Raffaele Esposito
- Producer: Room9

Sarah Toscano singles chronology
"Mappamondo" (2024)	"Sexy magica" (2024)	"Roulette" (2024)

Music video
- "Sexy magica" on YouTube

"Sexy magica" is a song co-written and recorded by Italian singer-songwriter Sarah Toscano. It was released on 30 April 2024 by Warner Music Italy as the fourth single from her second extended play Sarah.

== Description ==
The song, written by the singer-songwriter herself with co-writing contributions by Raffaele Esposito, aka Lele, and Giampiero Gentile, is produced by Room9.

== Promotion ==
The song was previewed during the twenty-third edition of the talent show Amici di Maria De Filippi.

== Music video ==
The music video for "Sexy magica", directed by Byron Rosero, was published on 4 June 2024 via Sarah Toscano's YouTube channel.

== Charts ==
Chart performance for "Sexy magica"
Chart (2024)	Peak position
Italy (FIMI)	83
Italy Airplay (EarOne)	40
