= Di4ries =

Italian teen drama television series

- Italian Netflix poster
- Italian: Di4ri
- Genre: Coming-of-age; Teen drama
- Written by: Mariano Di Nardo; Simona Ercolani; Angelo Pastore; Ivan Russo
- Directed by: Alessandro Celli
- Starring: Andrea Arru; Flavia Leone; Sofia Nicolini; Biagio Venditti; Liam Nicolosi; Federica Franzellitti; Pietro Sparvoli; Francesca La Cava; Fiamma Parente; Emily Shaqiri
- Composers: Tancredi Cantù; LDA
- Country of origin: Italy
- Original language: Italian
- No. of seasons: 2
- No. of episodes: 29

Production
- Executive producer: Elizabeth De Grassi
- Producers: Grazia Assenza; Simona Ercolani
- Running time: 24–52 minutes
- Production company: Stand By Me

Original release
- Network: Netflix
- Release: 18 May 2022 – 6 December 2023

Di4ries (stylized in all caps; Italian: Di4ri) is an Italian coming-of-age television series. It was first released by Netflix in Italy on 18 May 2022 and internationally on 26 July 2022.

== Premise ==
The series follows a group of students at Galileo Galilei Middle School in the fictional island towns of Marina Piccola (season 1) and Marina Grande (season 2). Throughout the series, the students navigate adolescence, crushes, rivalries, and friendships. Each episode centers on a different character who becomes the narrator and frequently breaks the fourth wall.

== Cast ==
=== Main ===
- Andrea Arru as Pietro Maggi, a stubborn but conscientious boy who isn't afraid to speak his mind
- Flavia Leone as Livia Mancini, a good girl and rule-follower dubbed "Miss Perfect" by her classmates
- Sofia Nicolini as Isabel Diop, a sporty, determined, and self-assured girl
- Biagio Venditti as Daniele Parisi, a nice, sensitive boy who tends to worry too much
- Liam Nicolosi as Giulio "Pac" Paccagnini, the class clown and Pietro's best friend
- Federica Franzellitti as Monica Piovani, the nerd of the class and Isabel's best friend
- Pietro Sparvoli as Mirko Valenti, a shy and insecure boy who loves music
- Francesca La Cava as Arianna Rinaldi, a snobby, vain, and arrogant girl
- Fiamma Parente as Bianca Laremi (season 2), Giulio's friendly and talented cousin
- Emily Shaqiri as Katia (season 2), the mean girl of Marina Grande

=== Recurring ===
- Massimo Pio Giunto as Michele Pastore (season 1–2), a classmate and friend of the students
- Marta Latino as Lucia (season 1), Arianna's best friend
- Lorenzo Nicolò as Silverio Mancini (season 1–2), Livia's cousin
- Christelle Arayata as Carlotta (season 1), Arianna and Lucia's friend
- Alessandro Laffi as Matteo "Il Grimo" (season 1), Livia's boyfriend and the school bully
- Narciso Santiago as Damiano Valenti (season 1), Mirko's brother
- Ismael Christ Carlotti as Manuel (season 2), Monica's boyfriend
- Gabriele Taurisano as Roby (season 2), Pietro's new teammate in Marina Grande
- Martina Frosini as Sara (season 2), Katia's best friend

=== Guest ===
- Fortunato Cerlino as Paolo Agresti (season 1), the janitor
- Tancredi Cantù as himself (season 1)
- Larissa Iapichino as herself (season 1)
- Pow3r as himself (season 2)
- Luciano Spinelli as himself (season 2)

== Episodes ==
=== Series overview ===
Series	Episodes	Originally released	
Series	Episodes	First released	Last released
1	15	18 May 2022	
2	14	14 September 2023	6 December 2023

=== Season 1 ===
No. overall	No. in season	Title	Duration	Directed by	Original release date
1	1	"Episode 1.1"	52 min	Alessandro Celli	18 May 2022
Pietro is almost 13 years old and lives in a dysfunctional home with parents who always argue. He lives in Marina Piccola and attends Galileo Galilei Middle School. His best friend Giulio makes a secret list for boys to rank the prettiest girl in school. Although opposed to the list, Pietro votes for Livia. The girls discover the list—where Livia is ranked first and Arianna is ranked second—and chaos ensues. Monica is dejected when she finds out that she wasn't ranked due to her nerdiness. Giulio bets Pietro to kiss both Livia and Arianna before the end of the school year. Matteo, the school bully and Livia's boyfriend, challenges Pietro to a five-on-five game of basketball. As enrollment is dwindling, the principal announces that their school is closing and the students will be transferred to Marina Grande, much to their shock and dismay. Pietro challenges Livia to a bike race where, if he wins, she has to kiss him. Livia wins, and asks him for help in getting revenge on Giulio for the girls. The girls steal the boys' clothes from the gym locker room and make them do a catwalk in their underwear to get their clothes back. In protest of the school shutting down, Pietro writes "Students First" on a wall in graffiti. He has to clean the wall as punishment, and Livia joins him. They joke around and Pietro tries to kiss her, but she brushes him off, calling him arrogant. Central characters: Pietro, Livia
2	2	"Episode 1.2"	28 min	Alessandro Celli	18 May 2022
Isabel is impatient to have her first kiss, so she sets her sights on Daniele. Damiano, Mirko's brother and Matteo's friend, pressures Mirko not to play in the five-on-five basketball game. To get closer to Daniele, Isabel offers to take Mirko's place on the team. After spending more time together, Isabel is convinced that Daniele will be her first boyfriend. After practice, she tries to kiss him, but he pulls away and tells her that he only likes her as a friend. In the first half of the basketball game, Isabel is angry and plays poorly. At halftime, she realizes that she shouldn't ruin everything because of one boy, and plays better in the second half. This is in vain, however, and Matteo's team wins, to everyone's disappointment. After the game, Daniele confesses to Isabel that he is gay. Central character: Isabel
3	3	"Episode 1.3"	25 min	Alessandro Celli	18 May 2022
Daniele is relieved to have told someone that he is gay. Mirko accidentally breaks Matteo's phone and has to replace it. Daniele loses his phone in class and Giulio suspects that someone stole it. Isabel sees Mirko giving Daniele's phone to Matteo. When she confronts Mirko in class, he angrily tells her that he gave Matteo his own phone. Daniele defends Mirko and says that he found his phone that morning, but this is a lie. Isabel asks Daniele if he has a crush on Mirko, which he initially denies, but later confirms. She tells him that he should confess his feelings, but he doesn't want to ruin their friendship. Mirko tells Damiano that he stole Daniele's phone and needs help getting it back from Matteo. After practice, Mirko walks Daniele home and confesses that he did take the phone, but Daniele forgives him. They sit by the water and Daniele kisses Mirko. Mirko smiles but abruptly leaves, leaving Daniele dejected. Central character: Daniele
4	4	"Episode 1.4"	29 min	Alessandro Celli	18 May 2022
Livia's perfectionism and tendency to overthink causes her anxiety and stress. Mirko asks Daniele if they can just be friends, and Daniele is heartbroken. After it becomes clear that Daniele struggles with just being friends, Mirko suggests they no longer spend as much time together, even switching his seat in class so they don't have to sit next to each other. Livia's parents, believing her to be more mature and understanding than her sister Elisa, miss her triathlon to meet with Elisa's teacher. A Czechoslovakian Wolfdog enters the school and—believing it to be a wolf—Livia and Monica hide in a closet to escape it, but get locked inside. Pietro helps Livia bust open the door and she falls into his arms. Livia comes in second at her triathlon. Pietro goes to congratulate her but is brushed aside by Matteo. Meanwhile, Livia gets jealous when she sees Pietro talking to Arianna and her friends. Central character: Livia
5	5	"Episode 1.5"	27 min	Alessandro Celli	18 May 2022
Pietro kisses Arianna at the beach, completing one-half of Giulio's bet, and leaves abruptly after. Giulio, who has an unrequited crush on Arianna, is angry at Pietro, even though he was the one who made the bet. Pietro and Giulio get into a fight in class and are sent to the principal's office. Pietro apologizes to Giulio, saying that he only kissed Arianna to win the bet, and all is forgiven. Pietro has a meeting with his parents and the principal, though his parents argue the entire time. Pietro lashes out at them and storms out of the meeting. With Giulio's help, Pietro breaks up with Arianna. The basketball team has a rematch against Matteo's team, and Pietro is determined to win and kiss Livia. Although Matteo's team starts out stronger, Pietro's team eventually catches up to them and wins. Matteo berates Pietro after the game, and when Livia defends Pietro, Matteo yells at her. Isabel later tells Pietro that Livia broke up with Matteo. Central character: Pietro
6	6	"Episode 1.6"	28 min	Alessandro Celli	18 May 2022
Monica is jealous of Isabel spending more time with Livia. Arianna invites the entire class to her birthday party. Although Isabel wants to attend, Monica dislikes Arianna and tells Isabel that they aren't going. Monica gets angry and hostile when she finds out that Isabel is going to watch Livia's triathlon, but Isabel finally retorts and tells Monica that she can't dictate who she can and cannot be friends with. Isabel meets Lamberto—who she is immediately attracted to—and finds out that he'll be attending Arianna's party. Isabel lies to Monica and attends the party alone. At the party, Matteo convinces Livia to get back together with him. Isabel talks to Lamberto and ends up kissing him. Arianna posts the photos from the party—including ones that show Isabel—and Monica angrily confronts Isabel over text. Central character: Isabel
7	7	"Episode 1.7"	28 min	Alessandro Celli	18 May 2022
Class 2D is going on a two-day trip to Rome. Monica refuses to speak to Isabel. Mirko, originally from Rome, is excited to meet up with his old friends. Livia and Arianna are assigned to the same room. On an excursion in the city, Livia buys a music box that she knows her mother will love, but later loses it and panics. While the class goes on a museum tour, Daniele and Mirko sneak out to see Mirko's friends and Pietro convinces Livia to sneak out to buy a replacement music box. Mirko's friends flake on him, but he finds out that Tancredi, his favorite singer, is nearby. Mirko, Daniele, Pietro, and Livia meet Tancredi, but miss the bus to return to the museum. Livia, feeling guilty about breaking the rules, calls their teacher to pick them up. The four are harshly reprimanded by their teacher and parents. It is revealed that Arianna stole the original music box from Livia. Central character: Livia
8	8	"Episode 1.8"	26 min	Alessandro Celli	18 May 2022
Daniele and Mirko are friends again, but Monica still refuses to speak to Isabel. Monica begins talking to a stranger named "Jcap" online. Daniele's parents urge him to meet Nico, the son of their friends who are in town for the week. After spending a day together, Daniele develops feelings for Nico. "Jcap" and Monica arrange to meet at recess, but as she waits, she receives a video of "Jcap" dressed as a ghost "because only a ghost would like a nerd like her." The ghost reveals himself as Giulio. Monica cries and rushes off, and Isabel finds her in the bathroom. Isabel apologizes for the party and they make up. Isabel, Monica, and Daniele plan a prank on Giulio as revenge. Giulio is unprepared for an exam and the teacher lets him retake it on condition that he studies with Monica, the top of the class. Daniele walks Nico to his ferry and Nico kisses him. Central character: Daniele
9	9	"Episode 1.9"	26 min	Alessandro Celli	18 May 2022
The students discover graffiti that says "Marina Piccola Rulez" on the side of the school. The principal assumes it was Pietro's doing and suspends him for five days. Monica begins studying with Giulio, but he struggles with reading and understanding the material. Monica spearheads an investigation to find the graffiti culprit. After another unsuccessful studying session, Giulio gives up and apologizes to Monica for wasting her time. Monica, reading the notes he left behind, realizes that Giulio is dyslexic and puts together a mind map to help him understand the material. In class, Giulio struggles with the oral exam and the teacher scolds him. Monica comes to his defense, telling the teacher that he is dyslexic and needs help. Giulio, embarrassed, denies being sick and storms out of the classroom. Monica discovers a past note from Matteo in Livia's notebook and realizes that Matteo is the culprit of the graffiti. Central character: Monica
10	10	"Episode 1.10"	27 min	Alessandro Celli	18 May 2022
Livia doesn't want to believe that her boyfriend was the graffiti culprit. Giulio and Monica are not speaking to each other, and Giulio is determined to catch the culprit without her help. Giulio's parents arrange a meeting with a psychologist for their son. At the psychologist's office, Giulio sees Arianna in the waiting room. She orders him not to tell anyone that he saw her there, and he agrees, on the condition that they go out on a date. On their date, Arianna confesses that her parents only send her to the psychologist to solve the issues that her mother causes. Giulio and Daniele find photographic proof that Matteo is the culprit. With the help of Monica's mind map, Giulio passes his oral exam, and all is forgiven between them. Central character: Giulio
11	11	"Episode 1.11"	24 min	Alessandro Celli	18 May 2022
Livia breaks up with Matteo for good and uses the extra time to prepare for her triathlon final. Arianna asks for Giulio's help in cheating on their test. Pietro and Matteo get into a fight in the bathroom. Pietro's parents are taking a break from their marriage. Livia and Pietro grow closer as friends, to Arianna's annoyance. Arianna convinces her friend Lucia, also a triathlon runner, to ask Matteo out on a date and make Livia jealous. Arianna gets a failing grade on the test and tries to berate Giulio, but he uncharacteristically brushes her off. After a tough race, Livia wins the triathlon, and, to make matters better, finds out that Larissa Iapichino was watching. Afterward, Pietro asks Livia out on a date, but she panics and tells him that she only likes him as a friend. Central character: Livia
12	12	"Episode 1.12"	24 min	Alessandro Celli	18 May 2022
Arianna is puzzled to find that, instead of fawning over her as usual, Giulio ignores her in school. The students find out that Tancredi is having an exclusive concert on the island, and Matteo has tickets. Instead of spending time with her daughter, Arianna's mother keeps Arianna's schedule full of activities like dance class, piano lessons, and gymnastics. In class, Arianna begs Giulio for the test answers, and he obliges once more. After class, he asks her to study together and she originally declines, but later changes her mind. However, her friends tell her that she can't be seen with him, and she declines once more. Later, she gets her first period in school, staining her jeans, and hides in the bathroom. Arianna begrudgingly asks Livia for help. Livia asks Giulio for his jeans for Arianna to wear, and, in turn, he goes to class in his underwear. Because of this, Arianna has a change of heart about her classmates. The next day, she goes on a date with Giulio and kisses him. Central character: Arianna
13	13	"Episode 1.13"	25 min	Alessandro Celli	18 May 2022
Mirko loves writing and listening to music. He asks his brother Damiano for two tickets to Tancredi's show from Matteo. Damiano agrees, on the condition that Mirko does his chores for two weeks. Arianna tells Giulio that she is confused about her feelings. Matteo tells Mirko and Damiano that he ran out of tickets. Damiano, fed up with Matteo, tells Mirko to let it go. Mirko asks Damiano why he is friends with Matteo, and Damiano says that he wasn't as lucky at finding true friends as Mirko was. Damiano successfully sneaks Mirko, Daniele, Pietro, Livia, Giulio, Isabel, and Monica into the concert. Pietro and Livia dance together. Afterward, Daniele convinces Tancredi to give a lecture at their school. At the lecture, Tancredi says that Daniele sent him one of Mirko's songs and he liked it. Mirko is elated and inspired to write a new song. Central character: Mirko
14	14	"Episode 1.14"	27 min	Alessandro Celli	18 May 2022
Pietro finds out that his parents have decided to get a divorce. With his school closing and his parents' separation, he feels his life spiraling out of control. Pietro and Daniele convince Mirko to write a song for their final basketball game against Matteo's team. Pietro plays a one-on-one game against Matteo, but Matteo injures him on purpose, rendering him unable to play in the final game. Mirko takes Pietro's place on the team. At the game, the team starts out losing, but after Silverio plays Mirko's new song, they catch up and tie the game. Michele is injured and Pietro volunteers to enter the game in his place. Pietro scores the winning basket and their team wins once and for all. Livia walks Pietro home and kisses him. Central character: Pietro
15	15	"Episode 1.15"	28 min	Alessandro Celli	18 May 2022
Pietro and Livia are officially dating. Pietro convinces his classmates to camp out in the school in protest of its closing. Nico plans to visit Marina Piccola and Daniele is anxious and afraid to get hurt. To avoid their plans, Daniele lies and tells Nico that he has to study. Matteo overhears Giulio asking Pietro about the bet in the bathroom. Later at the protest, Matteo tells Livia about the bet. Livia, angry and upset, leaves the protest and finds out that everyone's parents have been called. Nico, having been invited by Mirko, joins Daniele and the rest of the classmates in their protest. The teachers commend Livia on following the rules and urge her to talk some sense into her classmates, who will fail if they refuse to leave the school. After talking to her friends, Livia has a change of heart and decides to stay with her classmates in the school. Central character: Livia

=== Season 2 ===
No. overall	No. in season	Title	Duration	Directed by	Original release date
16	1	"Episode 2.1"	41 min	Alessandro Celli	14 September 2023
Despite the protest, the students are transferred to Marina Grande for their third year of middle school. Pietro dreads his first day but is relieved to find out that his friends are all in his class. He is surprised to see that Livia has cut her hair and dyed it blue. Livia, still upset about the bet, ignores him. Giulio and Arianna are dating, though Giulio is having second thoughts about the relationship. The students meet Bianca, Giulio's cousin and their newest classmate. They also meet Katia, the mean girl of Marina Grande and Livia's newest friend. Katia invites everyone a back-to-school party at her house. Pietro tries out for the Stella Marina basketball team led by Bianca's mother, Emma. He meets another classmate, Roby, and both of them make the team. The friends go to Katia's house for the party, but are shocked to find a sign that prohibits Marina Piccola students from entering. Instead, they go to Bianca's family's beach bar for a bonfire. Arianna breaks up with Giulio, much to his surprise. Pietro makes a pact with everyone to apply to the same liceo scientifico next year, so they'll never have to be separated. After Pietro helps Bianca clean up after the bonfire, Bianca kisses him. Livia sees this and rushes off. Central character: Pietro
17	2	"Episode 2.2"	27 min	Alessandro Celli	14 September 2023
Central character: Livia
18	3	"Episode 2.3"	29 min	Alessandro Celli	14 September 2023
Central character: Isabel
19	4	"Episode 2.4"	28 min	Alessandro Celli	14 September 2023
Central character: Bianca, Mirko
20	5	"Episode 2.5"	28 min	Alessandro Celli	14 September 2023
Central character: Daniele
21	6	"Episode 2.6"	28 min	Alessandro Celli	14 September 2023
Central character: Arianna
22	7	"Episode 2.7"	35 min	Alessandro Celli	14 September 2023
Central character: Everyone
23	8	"Episode 2.8"	26 min	Alessandro Celli	6 December 2023
Central character: Livia
24	9	"Episode 2.9"	27 min	Alessandro Celli	6 December 2023
Central character: Giulio
25	10	"Episode 2.10"	31 min	Alessandro Celli	6 December 2023
Central character: Pietro, Livia
26	11	"Episode 2.11"	29 min	Alessandro Celli	6 December 2023
Central character: Daniele, Mirko, Bianca
27	12	"Episode 2.12"	31 min	Alessandro Celli	6 December 2023
Central character: Isabel, Monica
28	13	"Episode 2.13"	29 min	Alessandro Celli	6 December 2023
Central character: Pietro, Giulio
29	14	"Episode 2.14"	33 min	Alessandro Celli	6 December 2023
Central character: Pietro, Livia, Isabel, (Bianca)

== Production ==
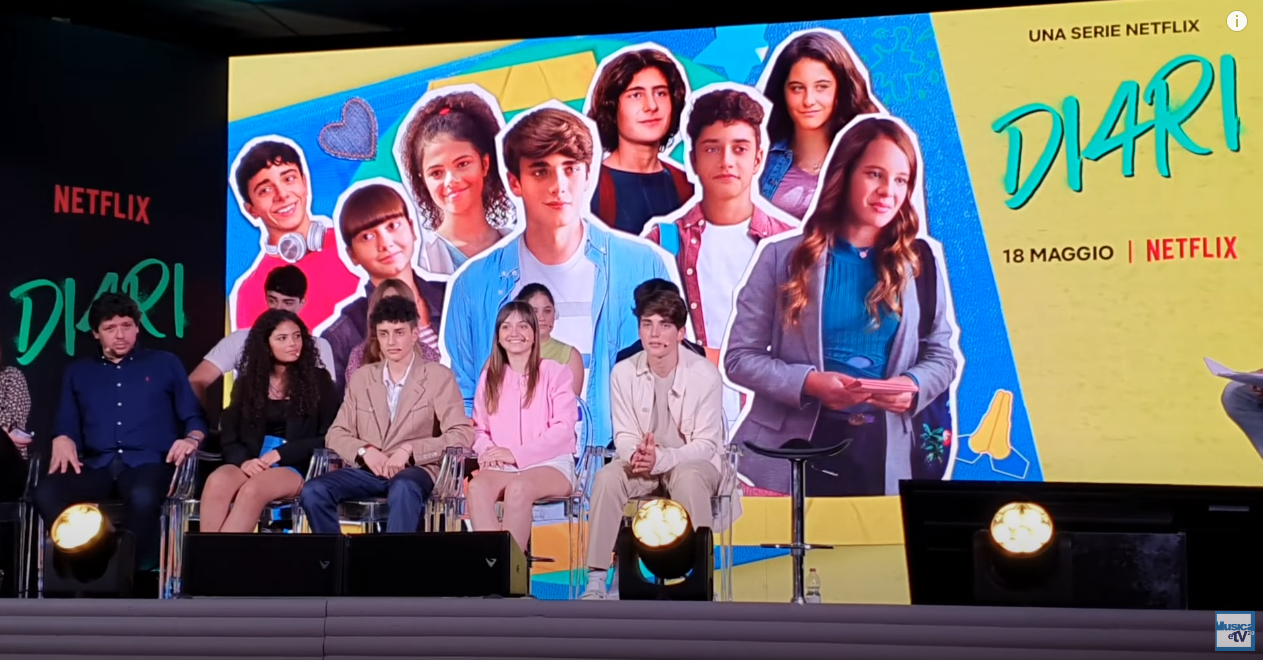
The cast of Di4ries at a press conference in 2022

Although the series is set on the fictional island of Persea, it was filmed on the island of Ischia. The first season was shot over 18 weeks. The second season was shot from December 2022 to May 2023.

== Release ==
The first season was released in Italy on 18 May 2022 and internationally on 26 July.

The first seven episodes of the second season were released in Italy on 14 September 2023 and were released internationally on 10 October. The last seven episodes were released in Italy on 6 December 2023 and were released internationally on 9 January 2024.
