= Pietro Foresti =

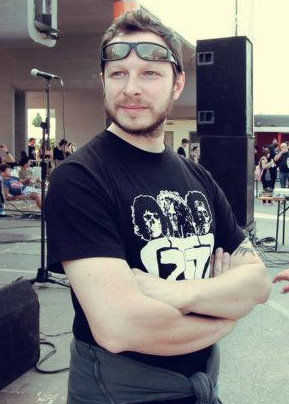
- Pietro Foresti at the Geox Theater in Padua, Italy, 7 June 2012

Background information
- Born: 29 June 1977 (age 49)
- Origin: Milan, Italy
- Genres: Rock, pop
- Occupations: Record producer, engineer, manager
- Years active: 2002–present
- Label: Tre Parole
- Website: pietroforesti.it

Pietro Foresti (born 29 June 1977 in Milan, Italy) is an Italian music producer, engineer, and manager. His production and engineering credits include work in Los Angeles, California, with numerous major label artists, including Tracii Guns (L.A. Guns, Brides of Destruction, Contraband, Guns N' Roses), Scott Russo (Unwritten Law), and Marvin Etzioni (Lone Justice). He has contributed to more than four dozen albums from artists and bands like Sylvia Massy Shivy (Red Hot Chili Peppers, Tool), Michael C. Ross (Christina Aguilera, Pussycat Dolls), Joe Gastwirt (Neil Young, Grateful Dead, Michael Jackson), Kaos India. and the debut EP of Sarah Toscano, winner of the twenty-third edition of the talent show Amici di Maria De Filippi.

As producer Foresti was nominated for two music awards in 2010 from the Union Fonografica Independiente (UFI) for the album The Promise by the band Warrior Poet, featuring Scott Russo. The album was nominated for "Best Rock Album" and "Best Alternative Rock Album." His production work has helped independent artists and bands gaining major contracts with Universal Music Italia, for example Kaos India, Lambstone, Hazan, Oscar from Statuto. Down To Ground, another band he has produced, toured with Skunk Anansie. In 2016 Foresti won the prize for "Best Rock Producer".

He has been a judge on several Italian television talent shows, including "Diventerò Una Star - e Una Persona Migliore," "La Spada d'Oro" (Acireale), Concorso Canoro's “Note Azzurre” (Cannobio), and "In…canto a Morciano."

Foresti holds a university degree in musicology from the University of Cremona, School of Musical Philology and Paleography, and master's degree in music therapy from the Art-Therapy School in Lecco.

Foresti is also a recognized performance and mental coach, offering assistance to musicians and performers with mental preparation and enhanced focus.

He currently lives in Monza.
