= Riv4lries =

2025 Italian television series

- Italian: Riv4li
- Genre: Coming-of-age; Teen drama
- Created by: Simona Ercolani
- Inspired by: Di4ries
- Screenplay by: Simona Ercolani; Serena Cervoni; Mauro Uzzeo; Chiara Panedigrano; Sara Cavosi; Angelo Pastore; Ivan Russo
- Directed by: Alessandro Celli
- Starring: Samuele Carrino; Edoardo Miulli; Kartika Malavasi; Lorenzo Ciamei; Melissa Di Pasca; Eugenia Cableri; Joseph Figueroa; Duccio Orlando; Andrea Arru
- Composers: Filadelfo Castro; Sarah Toscano; Mida
- Country of origin: Italy
- Original language: Italian
- No. of seasons: 1
- No. of episodes: 14

Production
- Executive producer: Grazia Assenza
- Producers: Teresa Carducci; Simona Ercolani
- Production location: Pisa
- Running time: 26–44 minutes
- Production company: Stand by Me

Original release
- Network: Netflix
- Release: 1 October 2025 – present

Riv4lries (stylized in all caps; Italian: Riv4li) is an Italian coming-of-age television series created by Simona Ercolani and spin-off of the series Di4ries. It premiered on Netflix on 1 October 2025.

== Story ==
The series tells the story of class 3D. At the center of attention are two rival groups: the Insiders, led by the popular Claudio and his best friend Dario, and the Outsiders, a new clique centered on the bold Terry, who has just arrived at the school from Rome and her new best friend Marzia, the class "nerd". A real conflict breaks out between the two groups, so intense that it seems as if an invisible wall divides the school into two factions. But little by little, Claudio, Terry, Dario, Marzia and their classmates – including Sabrina, Luca, Alessio and Paolo – realize that arguing and distancing themselves is not the right path. Only together can they break down the walls between them, both physical and emotional.

== Cast ==
=== Main ===
The Insiders

- Samuele Carrino as Claudio Carducci.
- Edoardo Miulli as Dario Bertone.
- Lorenzo Ciamei as Luca Bertone.
- Eugenia Cableri as Sabrina Landi.

The Outsiders

- Kartika Malavasi as Teresa "Terry" Moscati.
- Melissa Di Pasca as Marzia Ferretti.
- Duccio Orlando as Paolo Romagnoli.
- Joseph Figueroa as Alessio.

=== Recurring ===
- Francesca Della Ragione as Giorgia.

=== Guest ===
- Andrea Arru as Pietro Maggi.

== Episodes ==
| Series | Episodes | Originally released |
|---|---|---|
| 1 | 14 | 1 October 2025 |

== Production ==
Created by Simona Ercolani, directed by Alessandro Celli, and produced by Stand by Me, the film was shot entirely in Pisa. It premiered on 18 July 2025, at the 55th edition of the Giffoni Film Festival in the Elements (+10 anni) section.

== Soundtrack ==
The soundtrack and theme song were created using the single "Semplicemente" by Sarah Toscano and Mida, released on 12 September 2025.
