= Amarcord (song) =

Single by Sarah Toscano

from the album Met Gala
- Language: Italian
- Released: 12 February 2025
- Genre: Dance-pop
- Length: 3:03
- Label: Warner Music Italy
- Songwriters: Sarah Toscano; Jacopo Ettorre; Federica Abbate; Eugenio Maimone; Federico Mercuri; Giordano Cremona; Leonardo Grillotti
- Producers: ITACA; Wolvs

Sarah Toscano singles chronology
"Safety Net" (2024)	"Amarcord" (2025)	"Perfect" (2025)

Music video
- "Amarcord" on YouTube

"Amarcord" is a song co-written and recorded by Italian singer-songwriter Sarah Toscano. It was released by Warner Music Italy on 12 February 2025 as the second single from her debut studio album, Met Gala. The song competed in the Sanremo Music Festival 2025, placing 17th in the final rank.

== Description ==
The song, written by the singer-songwriter herself with Eugenio Maimone, Federica Abbate and Jacopo Ettorre, aka Jacopo Èt, is produced by ITACA, a team founded by the musical duo Merk & Kremont, and Leonardo "Wolvs" Grillotti.

== Promotion ==
After the confirmation of the singer-songwriter among the big names competing at the Sanremo Music Festival 2025, announced by Carlo Conti on TG1 on 1 December 2024, the title of the song was revealed on 18 December during the final of the eighteenth edition of the Sanremo Giovani singing competition.

== Music video ==
A music video of "Amarcord", directed by Byron Rosero, was released on 12 February 2025 via Sarah Toscano's YouTube channel.

== Charts ==
=== Weekly charts ===
Chart performance for "Amarcord"
Chart (2025)	Peak position
Italy (FIMI)	19
Italy Airplay (EarOne)	52

=== Year-end charts ===
Year-end chart performance for "Amarcord"
Chart (2025)	Position
Italy (FIMI)	76

== Certifications ==
Certifications for "Amarcord"
Region	Certification	Certified units/sales
Italy (FIMI)	Gold	100,000^{‡}
^{‡} Sales+streaming figures based on certification alone.
