= Baby K discography =

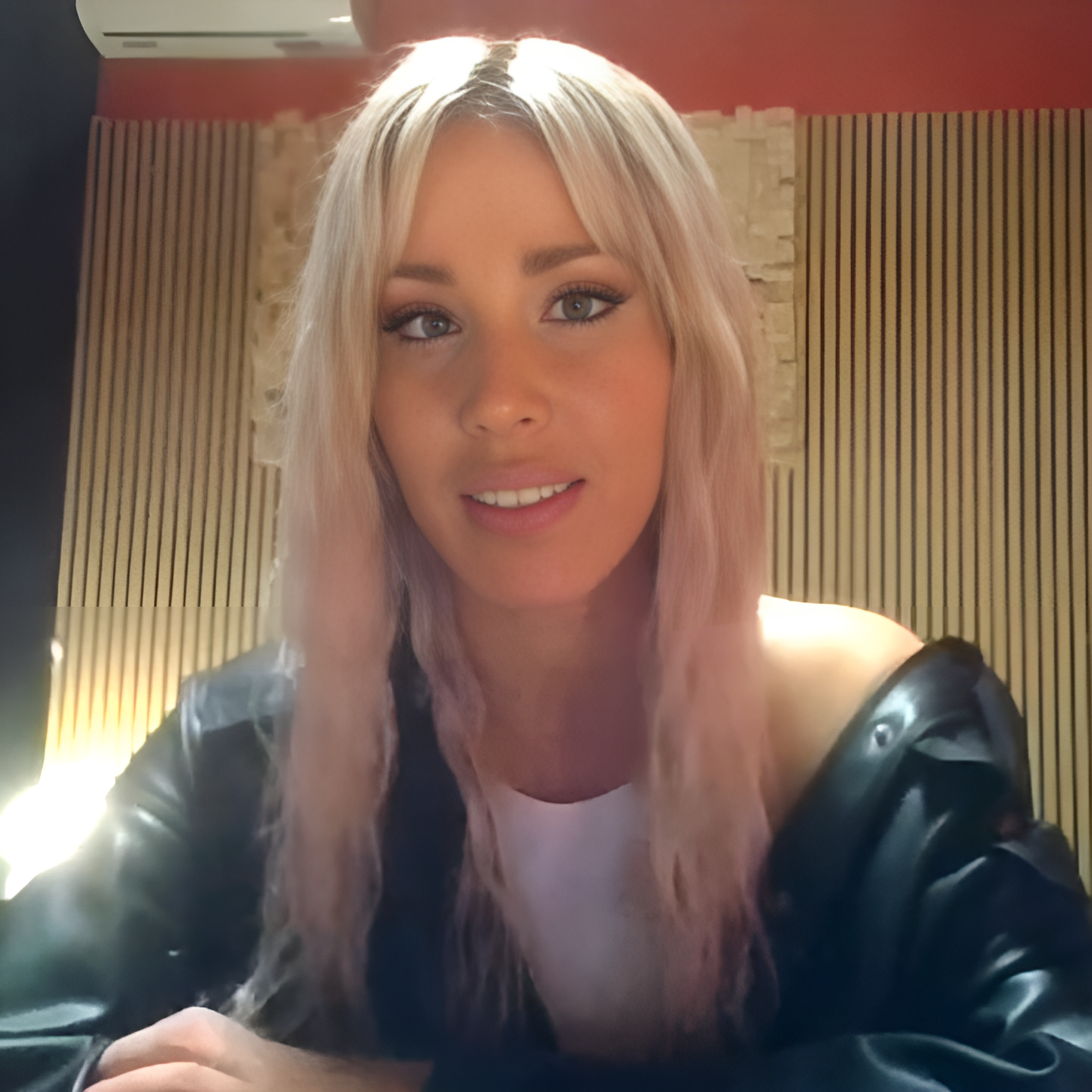
- Studio albums: 3
- EPs: 3
- Singles: 20

Italian recording artist Baby K has released three studio albums, three extended plays and twenty singles (including three as a featured artist). She is mainly known for her hits "Killer", recorded with Tiziano Ferro, and "Roma-Bangkok", a duet with Giusy Ferreri, which was the best-selling single of 2015 in Italy.

== Studio albums ==
List of studio albums, with selected details and chart positions
Title	Studio album details	Peak chart positions	
Title	Studio album details	ITA	SWI
Una seria	Released: 12 March 2013; Label: Sony Music Italy; Formats: CD, digital download	8	—
Kiss Kiss Bang Bang	Released: 11 September 2015; Label: Sony Music Italy; Formats: CD, digital download	4	89
Icona	Released: 16 November 2018; Label: Sony Music Italy; Formats: CD, digital download	6	77
Donna sulla luna	Released: 11 June 2021; Label: Sony Music Italy; Formats: CD, digital download	23	—
"—" denotes a recording that did not chart or was not released in that territory.

== Extended plays ==
List of extended plays with selected details
Title	Extended play details
SOS	Released: 16 October 2008; Label: Quadraro Basement; Format: Digital download
Femmina alfa	Released: 23 September 2011; Label: Quadraro Basement; Format: CD, digital download
Lezioni di volo	Released: 31 May 2012; Label: Quadraro Basement; Format: Digital download

== Singles ==
=== As lead artist ===
List of singles as lead artist, with selected chart positions and certifications, showing year released and album name
Title	Year	Peak chart positions							Certifications	Album
Title	Year	ITA	BEL (WL)	FIN	FRA	RUS	SWI	URU	Certifications	Album
"Femmina alfa"	2011	—	—	—	—	—	—	—		Femmina alfa
"Sparami"	2012	—	—	—	—	—	—	—		Una seria
"Killer" (featuring Tiziano Ferro)	2013	10	—	—	—	—	—	—	FIMI: Platinum	Una seria
"Non cambierò mai" (featuring Marracash)	2013	72	—	—	—	—	—	—	FIMI: Gold	Una seria
"Sei sola" (featuring Tiziano Ferro)	2013	94	—	—	—	—	—	—		Una seria
"Anna Wintour"	2015	—	—	—	—	—	—	—		Kiss Kiss Bang Bang
"Roma-Bangkok" (featuring Giusy Ferreri)	2015	1	— (Note: "Roma-Bangkok" did not enter the Ultratop 50, but peaked at number 17 on the Wallonia Ultratip chart.)	6	25	133	23	—	FIMI: Diamond	Kiss Kiss Bang Bang
"Chiudo gli occhi e salto" (featuring Federica Abbate)	2015	—	—	—	—	—	—	—	FIMI: Gold	Kiss Kiss Bang Bang
"Venerdì"	2016	—	—	—	—	—	—	—		Kiss Kiss Bang Bang
"Roma-Bangkok" (re-release featuring Lali)	2017	—	—	—	—	—	—	100		Non-album single
"Voglio ballare con te" (featuring Andrés Dvicio)	2017	2	—	—	—	—	20	—	FIMI: 5× Platinum; IFPI SWI: Gold	Icona
"Aspettavo solo te"	2017	—	—	—	—	—	—	—		Icona
"Da zero a cento"	2018	2	—	—	—	—	38	—	FIMI: 3× Platinum	Icona
"Come no"	2018	83	—	—	—	—	—	—		Icona
"Playa"	2019	9	—	—	—	—	—	—	FIMI: 2× Platinum	Donna sulla luna
"Buenos Aires"	2020	—	—	—	—	—	—	—		Donna sulla luna
"Non mi basta più" (featuring Chiara Ferragni)	2020	3	—	—	—	—	88	—	FIMI: 3× Platinum	Donna sulla luna
"Pa Ti" (with Omar Montes)	2021	69	—	—	—	—	—	—	FIMI: Gold	Donna sulla luna
"Mohicani" (with Boomdabash)	2021	7	—	—	—	—	—	—	FIMI: 2× Platinum	Donna sulla luna
"Non dire una parola" (with Alvaro Soler)	2021	–	—	—	—	—	—	—		Donna sulla luna
"Bolero" (with Mika)	2022	47	—	—	—	—	—	—	FIMI: Platinum	Donna sulla luna
"Easy"	2022	—	—	—	—	—	—	—		TBA
"M'ama non m'ama"	2023	—	—	—	—	—	—	—		TBA
"Fino al blackout"	2024	—	—	—	—	—	—	—		TBA
"Follia Mediterranea"	2025	—	—	—	—	—	—	—		TBA
"—" denotes a recording that did not chart or was not released in that territory.

=== As featured artist ===
List of singles as featured artist with selected chart positions
Title	Year	Peaks	Album
Title	Year	ITA	Album
"Bad Boy" (Manuel Rotondo featuring Baby K)	2014	95	Non-album singles
"Light It Up (Ora che non c'è nessuno)" (Major Lazer featuring Baby K)	2016	—	Non-album singles
"Dio benedica il reggaeton" (Fred De Palma featuring Baby K)	2019	76	Uebe
"—" denotes a recording that did not chart or was not released in that territory.

== Other appearances ==
Title	Year	Other artist(s)	Album
"Non sono pronti"	2007	Amir Issaa	Vita di prestigio
"Vera Resistenza"	2010	Amir Issaa, Killa Cali	Pronto al peggio
"Cosa ti prende"	2011	Lamiss	Follia amatoriale
"The B/The K"	2011	Bassi Maestro	Tutti a casa
"Mi piace"	2014	Two Fingerz	Two Fingerz 2
"Quelli Di Ieri"	2016	Luche	Malammore
"Kiss Me Licia"	2017	Cristina D'Avena	Duets - Tutti cantano Cristina
