= Federica Abbate =

Italian singer-songwriter (born 1991)

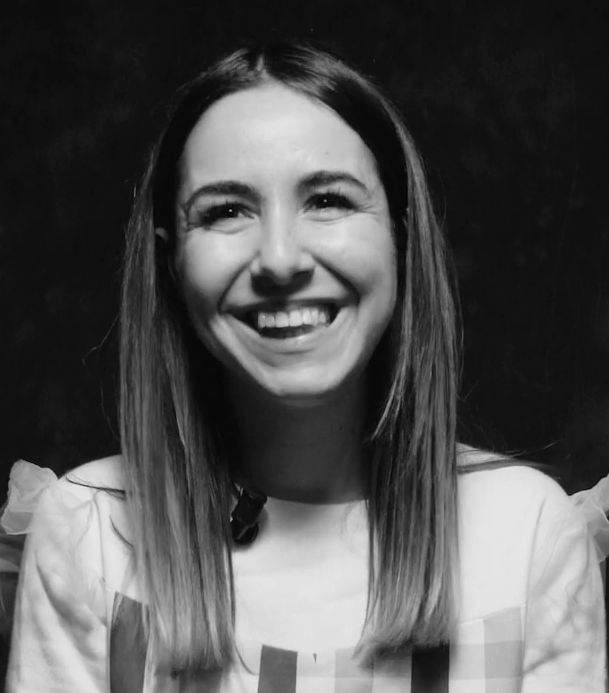
- Abbate in 2020

Background information
- Born: 23 January 1991 (age 35); Milan, Italy
- Genres: Pop; dance pop; R&B
- Occupations: Singer; songwriter
- Years active: 2014–present
- Label: UMG

Federica Abbate (born 23 January 1991) is an Italian singer and songwriter.

== Life and career ==
Abbate started playing piano at 5 years old and graduated in sociology. In 2013 she won a contest for songwriters promoted by SIAE and by the comune of Genoa, "Genova per voi", and got a contract with Universal Music Group. For her songs, she generally is the sole author for the music and collaborates with Cheope (Alfredo Giulio Rapetti, the son of Mogol) for the lyrics.

Abbate wrote over 100 songs, including successful hits the diamond certified hits "Roma-Bangkok" for Baby K and Giusy Ferreri, "L'amore eternit" for Fedez and Noemi. As a singer, Abbate featured "In radio" by Marracash, with whom she also toured, and with Baby K on "Chiudo gli occhi e salto", later certified gold by Fimi. She was also vocal coach in the Rai 2 musical reality show The Voice. Her song "Nessun grado di separazione", performed by Francesca Michielin, placed second at the 66th edition of the Sanremo Music Festival and was Italy's entry at the Eurovision Song Contest 2016. In 2016 she also wrote songs for Elodie, Fiorella Mannoia, Arisa, Gué Pequeno and Marracash.

During 2017 Abbate was the lyrichist of Michele Bravi's "Il diario degli errori" for Sanremo Music Festival 2017 and "Semplice" for Elodie, soundtrack for Federico Moccia's film Non c'è campo. She wrote "Dopotutto", debut single by Federica Carta, multi-platinum single "Voglio ballare con te" for Baby K and Andres Dvicio, and several singles for J-Ax, Fedez, Arisa, Giusy Ferreri and Emis Killa. In September 2017 Federica releases her debut solo single "Fiori sui balconi".

In January 2018 Abbate took part at Sanremo Giovani, for young Italian songwriters and singers, reaching the second position and winning the Critics' Award. On 18 May 2018 Abbate published her first EP, In foto vengo male, anticipated by "Pensare troppo mi fa male", in collaboration with Marracash. She also collaborated on Carl Brave "La cuenta", which entered at position 46 of the Italian Singles Chart. In 2018 Abbate also wrote songs with Emma Marrone, Alessandra Amoroso and Gemitaiz. She wrote successful summer singles, including "Amore e capoeira" for Giusy Ferreri and Takagi & Ketra, "Non ti dico no" for Loredana Bertè and Boomdabash, "Vivere tutte le vite" with Elisa and Eros Ramazzotti's "Per le strade una canzone".

In 2019 Abbate wrote several Italian hits for Boomdabash, including "Per un milione", "Mambo salentino" (with Alessandra Amoroso), "Ti volevo dedicare" (with J-Ax and Rocco Hunt). She composed "Arrogante" for Amici di Maria De Filippi's winner Irama, "Jambo" for Giusy Ferreri, Takagi & Ketra and Omi, "Una volta ancora" for Fred De Palma and Spanish singer Ana Mena, "Playa" by Baby K. She also worked with Fiorella Mannoia, Paola Turci and Fedez. In 2019 Abbate was also selected by Sanremo Giovani with "I sogni prima di dormire", but she was eliminated. On 21 May 2019 Abbate released the collaboration "Camera con vista" with Lorenzo Fragola.

In 2023 Abbate co-wrote Elodie's song "Due" and Mr. Rain's "Supereroi", both artists' entry for the 2023 edition of the Sanremo Music Festival. On 4 September 2023 she announced the release of her first studio album, Canzoni per gli altri, anticipated by the single of the same name in collaboration with Elisa. In September 2024 Abbate was honored with the Songwriter of the Year at the Billboard Italia Women in Music.

== Discography ==
=== Studio album ===
- Canzoni per gli altri (2023)

=== EPs ===
- In foto vengo male (2018)

=== Singles ===
- "Dammi ancora" (2013)
- "Fiori sui balconi" (2017)
- "Mi contraddico" (2018)
- "Pensare troppo mi fa male" with Marracash (2018)
- "Finalmente" (2018)
- "Quando un desiderio cade" (2019)
- "Camera con vista" with Lorenzo Fragola (2019)
- "La pioggia prima di cadere" with Mr. Rain (2023)
- "Canzoni per gli altri" with Elisa (2023)

As a featured artist

- "In radio" with Marracash (2015)
- "Chiudo gli occhi e salto" with Baby K (2015)
- "Niente canzoni d'amore" with Marracash (2016)
- "Un'estate al mare" with Selton (2018)
- "La cuenta" with Carl Brave and Franco126 (2018)
- "Canzone country" with J-Ax (2021)
- "Antifragili" with Michele Bravi (2022)
- "Angelo all'inferno" with Tedua and Salmo (2023)

== Songwriting credits ==
List of selected songs co-written by Federica Abbate
Song	Year	Artist(s)	Album
"Danzeremo a luci spente"	2014	Deborah Iurato	Deborah Iurato
"A volta capita"	2014	Deborah Iurato	Deborah Iurato
"Ogni minimo dettaglio"	2014	Deborah Iurato	Deborah Iurato
"Aurora"	2014	Deborah Iurato	Libere
"Domani mi avrai già dimenticato"	2014	Deborah Iurato	Libere
"L'amore eternit"	2015	Fedez feat. Noemi	Pop-Hoolista
"Vento di settembre"	2015	Anna Tatangelo	Libera
"A tre passi da te"	2015	Boomdabash feat. Alessandra Amoroso	Radio Revolution
"Il tuo sguardo manca"	2015	Il Volo	L'amore si muove
"Per te ci sarò"	2015	Il Volo	L'amore si muove
"Roma-Bangkok"	2015	Baby K feat. Giusy Ferreri	Kiss Kiss Bang Bang
"Kiss Kiss Bang Bang"	2015	Baby K	Kiss Kiss Bang Bang
"21 grammi"	2015	Fedez	Pop-Hoolista (Cosodipinto Edition)
"Tutto questo vento"	2015	Francesca Michielin	di20
"Un cuore in due"	2015	Francesca Michielin	di20
"Prometto di sbagliare"	2015	Giusy Ferreri	Hits
"Il mio stato di felicità"	2016	Alessandra Amoroso	Vivere a colori
"Nessun grado di separazione"	2016	Francesca Michielin	di20are
"È con te"	2016	Francesca Michielin	di20are
"È solo un attimo"	2016	Irene Fornaciari	Questo tempo
"L'amore della mia vita"	2016	Arisa	Guardando il cielo
"Come fosse ieri"	2016	Arisa	Guardando il cielo
"Una donna come me"	2016	Arisa	Guardando il cielo
"Da domani"	2016	Giovanni Caccamo	Non siamo soli
"Amen"	2016	Noemi	Cuore d'artista
"D'improvviso"	2016	Lorenzo Fragola	Zero Gravity
"Sto bene così"	2016	Rocco Hunt	SignorHunt
"La vie"	2016	Marianne Mirage	Quelli come me
"Deve venire il meglio"	2016	Marianne Mirage	Quelli come me
"Messi male"	2016	Marianne Mirage	Quelli come me
"Corri"	2016	Marianne Mirage	Quelli come me
"L'imperfezione della vita"	2016	Elodie	Un'altra vita
"La bellezza del mondo"	2016	Elodie	Un'altra vita
"Non cadiamo mai"	2016	Lodovica Comello	Non-album single
"Attimi preziosi"	2016	Moreno	Slogan
"Combattente"	2016	Fiorella Mannoia	Combattente
"Nessuna conseguenza"	2016	Fiorella Mannoia	Combattente
"L'abitudine che ho"	2016	Fiorella Mannoia	Combattente
"Il cielo guarda te"	2016	Fred De Palma	Hanglover
"Erba & Wi-fi"	2016	Marracash and Guè	Santeria
"Scusa"	2016	Izi feat. Moses Sangare	Fenice
"Il giorno e la notte"	2017	J-Ax and Fedez feat. Giusy Ferreri	Comunisti col Rolex
"Cuore nerd"	2017	J-Ax and Fedez feat. Alessia Cara	Comunisti col Rolex
"Meglio tardi che noi"	2017	J-Ax and Fedez feat. Arisa	Comunisti col Rolex
"Il cielo non mi basta"	2017	Lodovica Comello	Non-album single
"Il diario degli errori"	2017	Michele Bravi	Anime di carta
"Diamanti"	2017	Michele Bravi	Anime di carta
"Due secondi (cancellare tutto)"	2017	Michele Bravi	Anime di carta
"Come il sole ad ottobre"	2017	Sergio Sylvestre	Sergio Sylvestre
"Semplice"	2017	Elodie	Tutta colpa mia
"La distanza"	2017	Giusy Ferreri	Girotondo
"L'ultima notte"	2017	Marianne Mirage	Le canzoni fanno male
"Ho perso il mio amore"	2017	Arisa	Controvento – The Best Of
"Dopotutto"	2017	Federica Carta	Federica
"Voglio ballare con te"	2017	Baby K feat. Andrés Dvicio	Icona
"Aspettavo solo te"	2017	Baby K	Icona
"Linda"	2017	Emis Killa	Non-album single
"Tanto per cominciare"	2017	Michele Bravi	Anime di carta – Nuove pagine
"Milano"	2017	Michele Bravi	Anime di carta – Nuove pagine
"Il sole contro"	2017	Michele Bravi	Anime di carta – Nuove pagine
"Effetto domino"	2018	Emma	Essere qui
"Moscow mule"	2018	Benji & Fede	Siamo solo Noise
"Malibu"	2018	Carl Brave feat. Gemitaiz	Notti brave
"Non ti dico no"	2018	Boomdabash and Loredana Bertè	Barracuda and LiBertè
"Amore e capoeira"	2018	Takagi & Ketra feat. Giusy Ferreri and Sean Kingston	Non-album single
"D'estate non vale"	2018	Fred De Palma and Ana Mena	Uebe
"Rollercoaster"	2018	Emis Killa	Supereroe
"Come fossimo cowboy"	2018	Emis Killa	Supereroe
"Mille strade"	2018	Emis Killa	Supereroe
"Dalla tua parte"	2018	Alessandra Amoroso	10
"Simmetria dei desideri"	2018	Alessandra Amoroso	10
"In me il tuo ricordo"	2018	Alessandra Amoroso	10
"Vivere tutte le vite"	2018	Elisa feat. Carl Brave	Diari aperti
"Per il resto tutto bene"	2018	Eros Ramazzotti	Vita ce n'è
"Siamo"	2018	Eros Ramazzotti	Vita ce n'è
"Una vita nuova"	2018	Eros Ramazzotti	Vita ce n'è
"Dall'altra parte dell'infinito"	2018	Eros Ramazzotti	Vita ce n'è
"Buonamore"	2018	Eros Ramazzotti	Vita ce n'è
"Vale per sempre"	2018	Eros Ramazzotti feat. Alessia Cara	Vita ce n'è
"Record"	2019	Fedez	Paranoia Airlines
"Per un milione"	2019	Boomdabash	Barracuda (Predator Edition)
"Non ho mai"	2019	Paola Turci	Viva da morire
"Imparare ad essere una donna"	2019	Fiorella Mannoia	Personale
"Resistenza"	2019	Fiorella Mannoia	Personale
"Carillon"	2019	Fiorella Mannoia	Personale
"La mia rivoluzione"	2019	Alberto Urso	Solo
"Arrogante"	2019	Irama	Crepe
"Benvenuti in Italy"	2019	Rocco Hunt	Libertà
"La hit dell'estate"	2019	Shade	Non-album single
"Playa"	2019	Baby K	Donna sulla Luna
"Jambo"	2019	Takagi & Ketra feat. Giusy Ferreri and Omi	Non-album single
"Mambo salentino"	2019	Boomdabash and Alessandra Amoroso	Don't Worry (Best Of 2005-2020)
"Senza pensieri"	2019	Fabio Rovazzi feat. Loredana Bertè and J-Ax	Greatest Hits
"Ti volevo dedicare"	2019	Rocco Hunt, Boomdabash and J-Ax	Libertà
"Il tuo profumo"	2019	Fred De Palma and Sofía Reyes	Uebe
"Invincibile"	2020	Alberto Urso	Il sole ad est (Sanremo Edition)
"La vita breve dei coriandoli"	2020	Michele Bravi	La geografia del buio
"Mediterranea"	2020	Irama	Crepe
"Karaoke"	2020	Boomdabash and Alessandra Amoroso	Don't Worry (Best Of 2005-2020)
"Ciclone"	2020	Takagi & Ketra, Elodie, Mariah and Gipsy Kings	Non-album singles
"La isla"	2020	Giusy Ferreri and Elettra Lamborghini	Non-album singles
"A un passo dalla luna"	2020	Rocco Hunt and Ana Mena	Rivoluzione and Bellodrama
"Non faccio niente (per dimenticarti)"	2020	Chiara Galiazzo	Bonsai
"Ricominciare ancora"	2020	Arisa	Non-album single
"Supercalifragili"	2020	J-Ax feat. Annalisa and Luca Di Stefano	ReAle
"Don't Worry"	2020	Boomdabash	Don't Worry (Best Of 2005-2020)
"Venere e Marte"	2021	Takagi & Ketra, Marco Mengoni and Frah Quintale	Non-album single
"Mantieni il bacio"	2021	Michele Bravi	La geografia del buio
"La promessa dell'alba"	2021	Michele Bravi	La geografia del buio
"Maneggiami con cura"	2021	Michele Bravi	La geografia del buio
"Tutte le poesie sono d'amore"	2021	Michele Bravi	La geografia del buio
"Senza fiato"	2021	Michele Bravi	La geografia del buio
"A forma di origami"	2021	Mr. Rain	Petrichor
"Senza lacrime"	2021	Noemi	Metamorfosi
"Señorita"	2021	Clementino and Nina Zilli	Non-album singles
"Shimmy Shimmy"	2021	Takagi & Ketra feat. Giusy Ferreri	Non-album singles
"Un bacio all'improvviso"	2021	Rocco Hunt and Ana Mena	Rivoluzione
"Mohicani"	2021	Boomdabash and Baby K	Donna sulla Luna
"Ma stasera"	2021	Marco Mengoni	Materia (Terra)
"Falene"	2021	Michele Bravi and Sophie and the Giants	La geografia del buio
"Un altro ballo"	2021	Fred De Palma feat. Anitta	Unico
"Fino all'alba (ti sento)"	2021	Aiello	Meridionale
"Aspetta e spera"	2021	Elettra Lamborghini	Twerking Beach
"Solero"	2021	Lorenzo Fragola, The Kolors	Non-album single
"Vita"	2021	La Rappresentante di Lista	My Mamma
"Che classe"	2021	J-Ax feat. Francesco Sarcina	SurreAle
"Magari no"	2021	Tommaso Paradiso	Space Cowboy
"Fantastica"	2021	Rocco Hunt feat. Boomdabash	Rivoluzione
"Canzone inutile"	2021	Alessandra Amoroso	Tutto accade
"Tutte le cose che io so"	2021	Alessandra Amoroso	Tutto accade
"Tutto accade"	2021	Alessandra Amoroso	Tutto accade
"Cronaca di un tempo incerto"	2021	Michele Bravi	La geografia del buio
"Testa e croce"	2021	Matteo Romano	Non-album singles
"Inverno dei fiori"	2022	Michele Bravi	Non-album singles
"Miele"	2022	Giusy Ferreri	Cortometraggi
"Duecentomila ore"	2022	Ana Mena	Bellodrama
"Una cosa sola"	2022	Irama feat. Shablo	Il giorno in cui ho smesso di pensare (Deluxe)
"Senza chiedere permesso"	2022	Alex Wyse	Non siamo soli
"Zodiaco"	2022	Michele Bravi	Non-album single
"Tribale"	2022	Elodie	OK. Respira
"Tropicana"	2022	Boomdabash and Annalisa	Venduti
"Caramello"	2022	Rocco Hunt, Elettra Lamborghini and Lola Índigo	Rivoluzione
"Lucifero"	2022	Emis Killa	Non-album singles
"Easy"	2022	Baby K	Non-album singles
"Il giorno più speciale"	2022	Andrea Bocelli, Matteo Bocelli and Virginia Bocelli	A Family Christmas
"Bastava la metà"	2022	Ernia feat. Gaia and Guè	Io non ho paura
"OK. Respira"	2022	Elodie	OK. Respira
"Fuori dai guai"	2022	Noemi feat. Gemitaiz	Non-album single
"Un bel viaggio"	2023	Articolo 31	Protomaranza
"Supereoroi"	2023	Mr. Rain	Pianeta di Miller
"Due"	2023	Elodie	OK. Respira
"Danse la vie"	2023	Elodie	OK. Respira
"Claudia"	2023	Francesca Michielin	Cani sciolti
"Lentamente"	2023	Ana Mena	Bellodrama
"Filosofia del Fuck-Off"	2023	Articolo 31	Non-album single
"Mare caos"	2023	Paola & Chiara	Per sempre
"Non posso fare a meno di te"	2023	Lorenzo Fragola and Mameli	Crepacuore
"Viscerale (Closer)"	2023	Emis Killa feat. Rizzo	Effetto notte
"Toxic (Trainspotting)"	2023	Emis Killa feat. Salmo	Effetto notte
"Bel finale (The Butterfly Effect)"	2023	Emis Killa feat. Massimo Pericolo	Effetto notte
"Per sempre mai"	2023	Shade and Federica Carta	Diversamente triste
"Acquamarina"	2023	Ana Mena and Guè	Non-album single
"Lambada"	2023	Boomdabash feat. Paola & Chiara	Venduti
"Manifesto"	2023	Boomdabash	Venduti
"Ascendente"	2023	Elodie	Red Light
"Intervallo"	2023	Emma	Souvenir
"Indaco"	2023	Emma	Souvenir
"Un milione di notti"	2023	Mr. Rain and Clara	Pianeta di Miller
"Dimora naturale"	2023	Laura Pausini	Anime Parallele
"Zero"	2023	Laura Pausini	Anime Parallele
"Classico"	2023	Articolo 31	Protomaranza
"Moneylove"	2023	Massimo Pericolo feat. Emis Killa	Le cose cambiano
"Assurdo"	2024	Matteo Romano	Finta nostalgia
"King of the Jungle"	2024	Club Dogo	Club Dogo
"Mariposa"	2024	Fiorella Mannoia	Disobbedire
"Fino a qui"	2024	Alessandra Amoroso	Io non sarei
"Immortali"	2024	Mr. Rain	Pianeta di Miller
"Vite precedenti"	2024	Mr. Rain	Pianeta di Miller
"Mappamondo"	2024	Sarah Toscano	Sarah
"Opera"	2024	Il Volo	Ad Astra
"Tutto fuori controllo"	2024	Mace feat. Franco126, Kid Yugi and Izi	Māyā
"Malavita"	2024	Coma Cose	Vita fusa
"No Drama"	2024	Capo Plaza feat. Mahmood	Ferite
"Galassie"	2024	Irama	Antologia della vita e della morte
"Melodrama"	2024	Angelina Mango	Poké melodrama
"Black Nirvana"	2024	Elodie	Mi ami mi odi
"Ghetto Love"	2024	Icy Subzero feat. Clara	Non-album single
"Sexy shop"	2024	Fedez and Emis Killa	Non-album single
"Episodio d'amore"	2024	Geolier	Dio lo sa
"Solo guai"	2024	Mara Sattei	Non-album single
"Beatrice"	2024	Tedua feat. Annalisa	La Divina Commedia (Paradiso)
"Lettera a Draco"	2024	Shiva	Milano Angels
"Di Caprio"	2024	Fedez feat. Niky Savage	Non-album singles
"Il linguaggio del corpo"	2024	Paola & Chiara feat. BigMama	Non-album singles
"Amore disperato"	2024	Achille Lauro	Comuni mortali
"Tacchi (fra le dita)"	2024	Sarah Toscano	Met Gala
"Mmh"	2024	Fred De Palma feat. Rose Villain	Non-album single
"Niente di male"	2024	Giorgia	G
"Feeling"	2024	Elodie and Tiziano Ferro	Mi ami mi odi
"Perché?"	2024	Chiamamifaro	Lost & Found
"Tutta la differenza del mondo"	2024	Fiorella Mannoia	Disobbedire
"Giganti"	2024	Antonia	Relax
"Demoni"	2025	Emis Killa	Non-album single
"Febbre"	2025	Clara	Non-album single
"Battito"	2025	Fedez	Non-album single
"Eco"	2025	Joan Thiele	Joanita
"Fuorilegge"	2025	Rose Villain	Radio Vega
"Amarcord"	2025	Sarah Toscano	Met Gala
"Anema e core"	2025	Serena Brancale	Non-album single
"Futuri possibili"	2025	Franco126	Futuri possibili
"Pausa"	2025	Franco126	Futuri possibili
"Perdutamente"	2025	Achille Lauro	Comuni mortali
"Nati da una costola"	2025	Achille Lauro	Comuni mortali
"Scelte stupide"	2025	Fedez and Clara	Non-album single
"Odio amore chimico"	2025	Elodie	Mi ami mi odi
"Cuore nero"	2025	Elodie	Mi ami mi odi
"Sincero"	2025	Salmo	Ranch
"Conta su di me"	2025	Salmo	Ranch
"Cartine corte"	2025	Salmo	Ranch
"Incapace"	2025	Salmo	Ranch
"Una stupida scusa"	2025	Boomdabash and Loredana Bertè	Non-album single
"Un milione di mani"	2025	Luchè feat. Rose Villain	Il mio lato peggiore
"Taki"	2025	Sarah Toscano	Met Gala
"Serenata"	2025	Serena Brancale and Alessandra Amoroso	Io non sarei
"Piangere in discoteca"	2025	Il Pagante	FOMO
"L'unica"	2025	Giorgia	G
"Oh ma"	2025	Rocco Hunt and Noemi	Ragazzo di giù
"Yakuza"	2025	Elodie and Sfera Ebbasta	Mi ami mi odi
"Yummy yummy"	2025	Sillyelly feat. Yung Snapp and Rosa Chemical	Non-album singles
"Respiro"	2025	Jacopo Sol and Jr Stit	Non-album singles
"Uragani"	2025	Clara	Non-album singles
"Nuda"	2025	Gaia	Rosa dei venti
"Senza una stupida storia"	2025	Achille Lauro	Comuni mortali
"È naturale"	2025	Francesca Michielin feat. Planet Funk	Anime
"Eroi"	2025	Fiorella Mannoia	Non-album singles
"Telepaticamente"	2025	Fedez	Non-album singles
"Corpi celesti"	2025	Giorgia	G
"Luoghi perduti"	2025	Antonia	Non-album singles
"Effetto Michelangelo"	2025	Mr. Rain	Non-album singles
"Phrate"	2025	Emis Killa	Musica triste
"Sogni sporchi"	2025	Emis Killa	Musica triste
"Serpe"	2025	Emis Killa feat. Capo Plaza	Musica triste
"Dio non c'è"	2025	Paky feat. Alessandra Amoroso	Gloria
"Gran finale"	2025	Jacopo Sol	Non-album singles
"Casa in fiamme"	2025	Mr. Rain	Non-album singles
