= Joan Thiele discography =

Discography of Italian singer-songwriter Joan Thiele

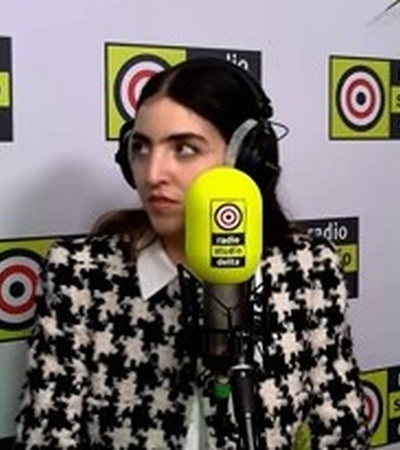
- Joan Thiele in February 2025
- Studio albums: 2
- EPs: 2
- Compilation albums: 1
- Singles: 20
- Music videos: 17

The discography of Italian singer-songwriter Joan Thiele consists of two studio albums, one compilation album, two EP, twenty singles and seventeen music videos.

== Albums ==
=== Studio albums ===
List of albums, with selected chart positions
Title	Album details	Peak chart positions
Title	Album details	ITA
Tango	Release date: 15 June 2018; Label: Universal; Formats: LP, digital download, streaming	—
Joanita	Release date: 21 February 2025; Label: Numero Uno, Sony Music Italy; Formats: LP, CD, digital download, streaming	12
"—" denotes album that did not chart or were not released.

=== Compilation albums ===
Title	Album details
Atti	Release date: 20 May 2022; Label: Undamento; Formats: LP

== Extended plays ==
Title	Album details	Peak chart positions
Title	Album details	ITA
Joan Thiele	Release date: 10 June 2016; Label: Universal; Formats: CD, digital download, streaming	91
Operazione oro	Release date: 19 March 2020; Label: Polydor, Universal; Formats: digital download, streaming	—
"—" denotes EP that did not chart or were not released.

== Singles ==
=== As lead artist ===
Title	Year	Peak chart positions	Album or EP
Title	Year	ITA	Album or EP
"Save Me"	2016	—	Joan Thiele
"Taxi Driver"	2016	—	Joan Thiele
"Lost Ones"	2016	—	Joan Thiele
"Armenia"	2017	—	Tango
"Fire"	2017	—	Tango
"Polite"	2018	—	Tango
"Le vacanze"	2019	—	Operazione oro
"Puta"	2020	—	Operazione oro
"Bambina"	2020	—	Operazione oro
"Sempre la stessa"	2020	—	Operazione oro
"Atto I – Memoria del futuro"	2021	—	Atti
"Atto II – Disordinato spazio"	2021	—	Atti
"Atto III – L'errore"	2021	—	Atti
"Proiettili (ti mangio il cuore)" (with Elodie)	2022	—	OK. Respira
"Veleno"	2024	—	Joanita
"Eco"	2025	30	Joanita
"Allucinazione"	2025	—	Joanita
"—" denotes a single that did not chart or was not released.

=== As featured artist ===
List of singles as featured artist, with selected chart positions, showing year released and album name
Title	Year	Peak chart positions	Album
Title	Year	ITA	Album
"Le ragazze di Porta Venezia – The Manifesto" (Myss Keta featuring La Pina, Elodie, Priestess, Joan Thiele and Roshelle)	2019	—	Paprika
"Verdad" (Golden Years featuring Joan Thiele and Ele A)	2023	—	Non-album single
"Milano baby" (Fabri Fibra featuring Joan Thiele)	2025	68	Mentre Los Angeles brucia
"—" denotes a single that did not chart or was not released.

== Guest appearances ==
List of songs, showing year released, selected chart positions and album name
Title	Year	Peak chart positions	Certifications	Album
Title	Year	ITA	Certifications	Album
"Le ragazze di Porta Venezia Remix" (Myss Keta featuring Elodie, Priestess and Joan Thiele)	2019	—		Paprika
"No Privacy/No Caption Needed" (Nitro featuring Joan Thiele)	2020	58		GarbAge
"Senza fiato" (Mace featuring Venerus and Joan Thiele)	2021	43	FIMI Gold	OBE
"No Bad Vibes" ($omber featuring Joan Thiele)	2021	—		Non-album single
"Futuro wow (Goedi Rmx)" (Goedi featuring Joan Thiele)	2022	—		Re orchestra EP
"Intuizione sincerità" (Ceri featuring Joan Thiele)	2022	—		Waxtape
"Lauryn Hill" (Don Joe featuring Nicola Siciliano, Guè and Joan Thiele)	2023	—		Don dada
"Fiore" (Tropico featuring Joan Thiele)	2023	—		Chiamami quando la magia finisce
"Forse domani" (Colapesce Dimartino featuring Joan Thiele)	2023	—		Lux Eterna Beach
"Viaggio contro la paura" (Mace featuring Joan Thiele and Gemitaiz)	2024	73		Māyā
"Miraggio" (Neffa featuring Joan Thiele and Gemitaiz)	2025	—		Canerandagio parte 1
"Che storia sei?" (Shablo featuring Joan Thiele, Joshua and Nayt)	2025	—		Manifesto
"Occhi diamanti" (Frah Quintale featuring Joan Thiele)	2025	—		Amor proprio
"—" denotes a song that did not chart or was not released.

== Songwriting credits ==
List of songs written or co-written by Joan Thiele and performed by other artists
Title	Year	Artist	Album
"OK. Respira" (Written by Elodie Di Patrizi, Alessandra Joan Thiele, Federica Abbate and Jacopo Ettorre, Leonardo Grillotti, Eugenio Maimone, Federico Mercuri and Giordano Cremona)	2022	Elodie	OK. Respira
"Boy Boy Boy" (Written by Elodie Di Patrizi, Alessandra Joan Thiele, Adel Al Kassem and Diego Vincenzo Vettraino)	2023	Elodie	OK. Respira
"Red Light" (Written by Elodie Di Patrizi, Alessandra Joan Thiele, Marco Spaggiari and Rocco Giovannoni)	2023	Elodie	Red Light
"Euphoria" (Written by Elodie Di Patrizi, Alessandra Joan Thiele, Marco Spaggiari and Rocco Giovannoni)	2023	Elodie	Red Light
"Thaurus" (Written by Elodie Di Patrizi, Alessandra Joan Thiele, Marco Spaggiari and Rocco Giovannoni)	2025	Elodie	Mi ami mi odi

== Music videos ==
Title	Year	Director(s)
"Save Me"	2016	Giada Bossi
"Taxi Driver"	2016	Fabrizio Conte
"Lost Ones"	2016	Giada Bossi
"Armenia"	2017	Giulia Achenza and Giada Bossi
"Fire"	2017	Giada Bossi
"Polite"	2018	Federico Brugia
"Le vacanze"	2019	Simone Rovellini
"Le ragazze di Porta Venezia - The Manifesto"	2019	Simone Rovellini
"Puta"	2020	Tommaso Ottomano
"Sempre la stessa"	2020	Gio Positivo
"Futuro Wow"	2021	Giovanni Viganò, Roberto Ortu and Martina Abbado
"Proiettili (ti mangio il cuore)"	2022	Roberto Ortu
"Veleno"	2024	Bianca Peruzzi
"Eco"	2025	Roberto Ortu
"Allucinazione"	2025	Roberto Ortu
"Milano baby" (visual)	2025	Fabrizio Conte
"Milano baby"	2025	Cosimo Alemà
