= Calcutta (singer) =

Italian singer-songwriter

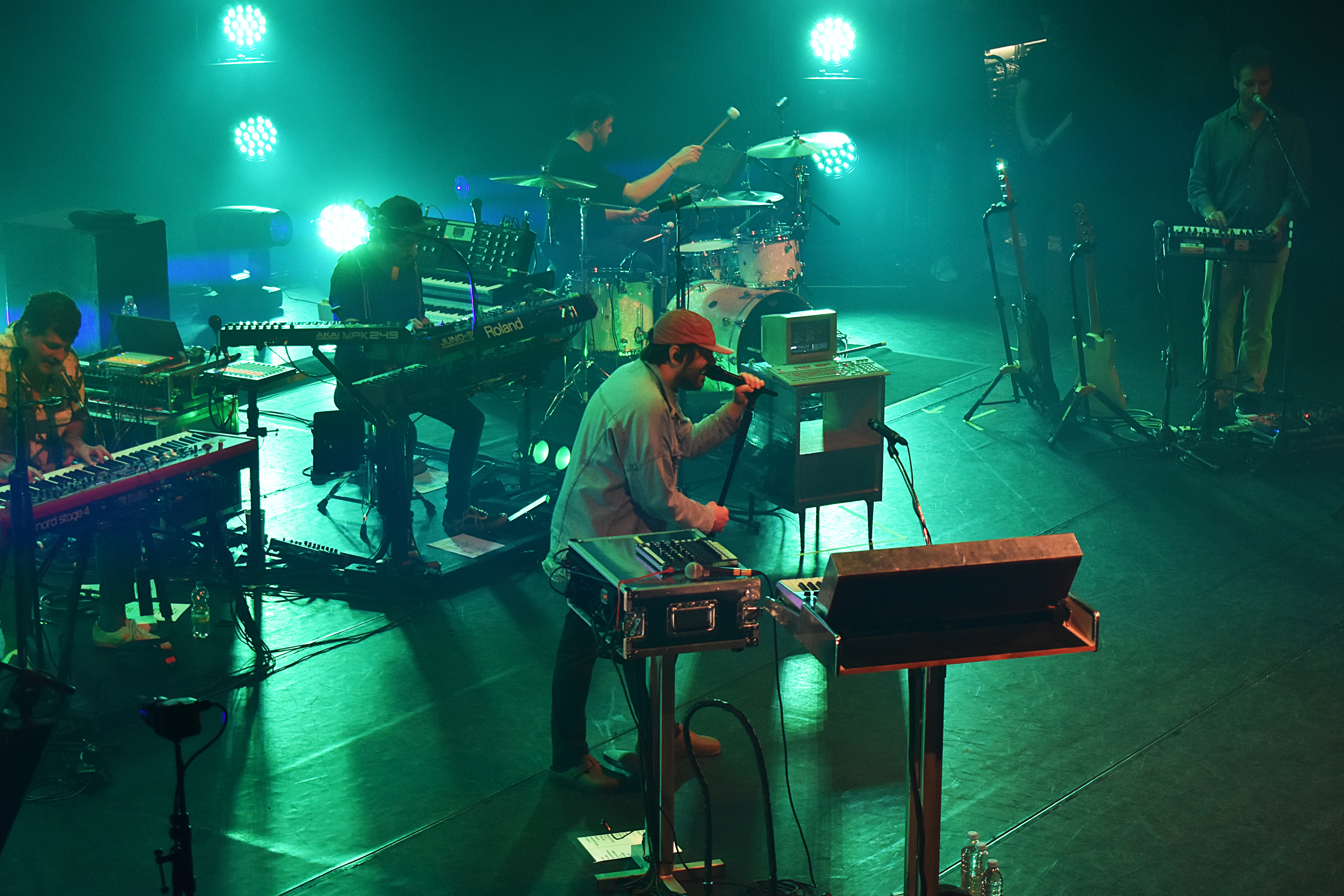
- Calcutta in concert at the Olympia in Paris in 2024

Background information
- Born: Edoardo D'Erme; 19 April 1989 (age 36); Latina, Lazio, Italy
- Genres: Indie pop
- Occupations: Singer; songwriter
- Instruments: Vocals; guitar
- Years active: 2012–present
- Labels: Geograph Records; Bomba Dischi

Edoardo D'Erme (born 19 April 1989), better known as Calcutta, is an Italian singer-songwriter. He debuted with the album Forse… (Maybe...), released by Geograph Records in 2012. Its follow-up, Mainstream, was released by Bomba Dischi on 30 November 2015, preceded by the single "Cosa mi manchi a fare". Initially ignored by Italian media, the album started to achieve success after a few months, when its lead single received airplay by Italian radio networks. The song "Oroscopo", produced by Takagi & Ketra, was released as a stand-alone single in May 2016. Since its release, Calcutta considered the song as something which did not represent himself; despite this, it became his first commercial success and his first single to be certified gold by the Federation of the Italian Music Industry.

In 2018, Calcutta's third studio album, Evergreen, became his first number-one on the Italian Albums Chart. The album spawned singles including "Orgasmo", "Paracetamolo" and "Pesto". The album was re-released in 2019, with the singles "Punto" and "Sorriso (Milano Dateo)".

In 2019, Calcutta recorded the single "La luna e la gatta" with producers Takagi & Ketra and fellow singer-songwriters Jovanotti and Tommaso Paradiso. During his career, he also appeared as a featured artist on the singles "Se piovesse il tuo nome", released in 2018 with Elisa, and "Blue Jeans" (2020), recorded as a duet with Franco126. He also penned songs for other Italian recording artists, including Francesca Michielin's "Io non abito al mare", Fabri Fibra's "Come mai", Emma's "Latina", Nina Zilli's "Mi hai fatto fare tardi" and Luca Carboni's "Io non voglio".

In 2021, Marracash and Calcutta released the song "Laurea ad honorem" by Marracash, from the album Noi, loro, gli altri. The song was certified Gold by FIMI.

In May 2023, Calcutta announced his new album "Relax" on his Instagram account, also promoting an 8 date tour in Italy. It came out in October 2023, the fourth record in his discography.

== Discography ==
=== Studio albums ===
List of studio albums, with chart positions and certifications
Title	Album details	Peak chart positions		Certifications
Title	Album details	ITA	SWI	Certifications
Forse...	Released: 18 December 2012; Label: Geograph Records; Format: CD, digital download, streaming	—	—	
Mainstream	Released: 30 November 2015; Label: Bomba Dischi; Format: CD, LP, digital download, streaming	7	—	FIMI: 3× Platinum
Evergreen	Released: 25 May 2018; Label: Bomba Dischi; Format: CD, LP, digital download, streaming	1	—	FIMI: 2× Platinum
Relax	Released: 20 October 2023; Label: Bomba Dischi; Format: CD, LP, digital download, streaming	1	36	FIMI: 2× Platinum

=== Singles ===
==== As lead artist ====
List of singles as lead artist, with selected chart positions, showing year released and album name
Title	Year	Peak chart positions	Certifications	Album
Title	Year	ITA	Certifications	Album
"Cosa mi manchi a fare"	2015	98	FIMI: 3× Platinum	Mainstream
"Gaetano"	2015	—	FIMI: 2× Platinum	Mainstream
"Frosinone"	2015	—	FIMI: Platinum	Mainstream
"Oroscopo" (featuring Takagi & Ketra)	2016	80	FIMI: 3× Platinum	Mainstream
"Orgasmo"	2017	11	FIMI: Platinum	Evergreen
"Pesto"	2018	10	FIMI: 2× Platinum	Evergreen
"Paracetamolo"	2018	12	FIMI: 2× Platinum	Evergreen
"Kiwi"	2018	31	FIMI: Gold	Evergreen
"Sorriso (Milano Dateo)"	2019	17	FIMI: 2× Platinum	Evergreen
"2minuti"	2023	3	FIMI: 2× Platinum	Relax
"Giro con te"	2024	13	FIMI: Gold	Relax
"Controtempo"	2024	16	FIMI: Platinum	Relax
"—" denotes a single that did not chart or was not released.

==== As featured artist ====
List of singles as featured artist, with selected chart positions, showing year released and album name
Title	Year	Peak chart positions	Certifications	Album
Title	Year	ITA	Certifications	Album
"Se piovesse il tuo nome" (Elisa featuring Calcutta)	2018	4	FIMI: 4× Platinum	Diari aperti
"La musica italiana" (Giorgio Poi featuring Calcutta)	2019	—		Smog
"La luna e la gatta" (Takagi & Ketra featuring Tommaso Paradiso, Jovanotti and Calcutta)	2019	9	FIMI: 2× Platinum	Non-album single
"Mia" (Giovanni Truppi featuring Calcutta)	2019	—		5
"Blue Jeans" (Franco126 featuring Calcutta)	2020	33	FIMI: Platinum	Multisala
"Laurea ad honorem" (Marracash featuring Calcutta)	2022	8	FIMI: 2× Platinum	Noi, loro, gli altri
"—" denotes a single that did not chart or was not released.

=== Other charted or certified songs ===
List of other charted or certified songs, showing year released, selected chart positions, certifications, and originating album
Title	Year	Peak chart positions	Certifications	Album
Title	Year	ITA	Certifications	Album
"Limonata"	2016	—	FIMI: Gold	Mainstream
"Del verde"	2016	85	FIMI: Platinum	Mainstream
"Briciole"	2018	40		Evergreen
"Saliva"	2018	45		Evergreen
"Dateo"	2018	88		Evergreen
"Hübner"	2018	44	FIMI: Gold	Evergreen
"Nuda nudissima"	2018	67		Evergreen
"Rai"	2018	92		Evergreen
"Due punti"	2019	89		Evergreen
"Coro"	2023	57		Relax
"Tutti"	2023	9	FIMI: Platinum	Relax
"Intermezzo3"	2023	55		Relax
"SSD"	2023	35		Relax
"Loneliness"	2023	34		Relax
"Ghiaccioli"	2023	46		Relax
"Preoccuparmi"	2023	45		Relax
"Allegria..."	2023	72		Relax
"—" denotes a song that did not chart or was not released.

== Songwriting credits ==
List of songs written or co-written by Calcutta (credited with his full name Edoardo D'Erme) and performed by other artists
Title	Year	Artist	Album
"Il postino" (Written by Edoardo D'Erme)	2016	I Camillas	Tennis d'amor
"Milano intorno" (Written by Alessandro Aleotti, Federico Lucia, Edoardo D'Erme, Alessandro Merli and Fabio Clemente)	2017	J-Ax and Fedez	Comunisti col Rolex
"Allegria" (Written by Alessandro Aleotti, Federico Lucia, Edoardo D'Erme, Alessandro Merli and Fabio Clemente)	2017	J-Ax and Fedez featuring Loredana Bertè	Comunisti col Rolex
"Mi hai fatto fare tardi" (Written by Maria Chiara Fraschetta, Tommaso Paradiso, Edoardo D'Erme and Dario Faini)	2017	Nina Zilli	Modern Art
"Io non abito al mare" (Written by Francesca Michielin and Edoardo D'Erme)	2017	Francesca Michielin	2640
"Tropicale" (Written by Edoardo D'Erme and Dario Faini)	2018	Francesca Michielin	2640
"La serie B" (Written by Francesca Michielin and Edoardo D'Erme)	2018	Francesca Michielin	2640
"Tapioca" (Written by Francesca Michielin, Edoardo D'Erme and Marco Jacopo Bianchi)	2018	Francesca Michielin	2640
"Io non voglio" (Written by Luca Carboni, Edoardo D'Erme and Dario Faini)	2018	Luca Carboni	Sputnik
"Femme" (Written by Francesca Michielin and Edoardo D'Erme)	2018	Francesca Michielin	2640 (physical reissue)
"Se piovesse il tuo nome" (Written by Edoardo D'Erme, Vanni Casagrande and Dario Faini)	2018	Elisa	Diari aperti
"Tequila e San Miguel" (Written by Edoardo D'Erme, Tommaso Paradiso, Alessandro Merli and Fabio Clemente)	2019	Loredana Bertè	Non-album single
"Come mai" (Written by Fabrizio Tarducci, Federico Bertollini, Edoardo D'Erme and Dario Faini)	2019	Fabri Fibra featuring Franco126	Il tempo vola 2002–2020
"Latina" (Written by Edoardo D'Erme, Davide Petrella and Dario Faini)	2020	Emma	Fortuna (digital reissue)
"Mastroianni" (Written by Massimiliano Cellamaro, Davide Petrella, Edoardo D'Erme, Massimiliano Dagani and Francesco Catitti)	2021	Sottotono	Originali
"Litoranea" (Written by Elisa Toffoli, Edoardo D'Erme, Davide Petrella, Gaetano Scognamiglio and Simone Benussi)	2022	Elisa featuring Matilda De Angelis	Ritorno al futuro/Back to the Future
"Mare di guai" (Written by Arianna Del Ghiaccio, Edoardo D'Erme, Vincenzo Centrella and Dario Faini)	2023	Ariete	La notte
"Parafulmini" (Written by Matteo Professione, Andrea Brasi, Fabrizio Tarducci, Edoardo D'Erme, Davide Petrella and Stefano Tognini)	2023	Ernia, Bresh and Fabri Fibra	Io non ho paura
"A capo il mondo" (Written by Federica Abbate, Edoardo D'Erme and Francesco Catitti)	2023	Federica Abbate and Francesca Michielin	Canzoni per gli altri
"Due nuvole" (Written by Edoardo D'Erme and Marta Venturini)	2023	Marco Mengoni	Materia (Prisma)
"SOS" (Written by Angelica Schiatti and Edoardo D'Erme)	2023	Angelica	Sconosciuti superstar
"Quando nevica" (Written by Elisa Toffoli, Edoardo D'Erme and Dario Faini)	2023	Elisa	Intimate – Recordings at Abbey Road Studios
"Sconosciuti superstar" (Written by Angelica Schiatti and Edoardo D'Erme)	2024	Angelica	Sconosciuti superstar
"Me lo tengo per me" (Written by Angelica Schiatti and Edoardo D'Erme)	2024	Angelica	Sconosciuti superstar
"Mandare tutto all'aria" (Written by Marco Mengoni, Edoardo D'Erme, Davide Petrella and Andrea Suriani)	2024	Marco Mengoni	Non-album single
"Tu con chi fai l'amore" (Written by Antonio Fiordispino, Edoardo D'Erme, Davide Petrella and Stefano Tognini)	2025	The Kolors	Non-album single
"Luna rossa" (Written by Dario Lombardi, Duccio Caponi, Pietro Serafini, Edoardo D'Erme and Davide Petrella)	2025	Bnkr44	Tocca il cielo
"Il mio giorno preferito" (Written by Eros Ramazzotti, Edoardo D'Erme, Tommaso Paradiso, Antonio Cirigliano and Michele Canova)	2025	Eros Ramazzotti	Una storia importante
"Golpe" (Written by Giorgia Todrani, Davide Petrella, Edoardo D'Erme, Gaetano Scognamiglio and Dario Faini)	2025	Giorgia	G
"Dai che fai" (Written by Andrea Brasi, Edoardo D'Ermea and Rosario Lenzo)	2025	Bresh	Mediterraneo
"Aiaiai" (Written by Angelina Mango, Edoardo D'Erme and Dario Faini)	2025	Angelina Mango	Caramé

== Awards and nominations ==
Awards and nominations for Calcutta
Year	Ceremony	Category	Work	Result
2016	Meeting Italiano delle Etichette Indipendenti (MEI)	Italian Independent Music Video	"Cosa mi manchi a fare"	Won
2018	MTV Europe Music Awards	Best Italian Act	Himself	Nominated
2018	Rockol Awards	Best Italian Music Video – Critic's Choice	"Paracetamolo"	Nominated
