= Mambo salentino =

Single by Boomdabash and Alessandra Amoroso

from the album Don't Worry (Best of 2005-2020)
- Language: Italian
- Released: 7 June 2019
- Genre: Pop rap; electropop
- Length: 2:35
- Label: Universal Music Group
- Songwriters: Federica Abbate; Rocco Pagliarulo; Alfredo Rapetti; Alessandro Merli; Fabio Clemente
- Producer: Takagi & Ketra

Boomdabash singles chronology
"Per un milione" (2019)	"Mambo salentino" (2019)	"Ti volevo dedicare" (2019)

Alessandra Amoroso singles chronology
"Forza e coraggio" (2019)	"Mambo salentino" (2019)	"Immbile 10+1" (2019)

Music video
- "Mambo salentino" on YouTube

"Mambo salentino" is a song by Italian group Boomdabash and Italian singer Alessandra Amoroso. It was released on 7 June 2019 through Universal Music Italy, as the lead single from the group greatest hits album Don't Worry (Best of 2005-2020).

== Background and composition ==
The song was firstly written by Federica Abbate, Alfredo "Cheope" Rapetti and Rocco Pagliarulo, and then produced and rewritten by Boomdabash. "Mambo salentino" is the second collaboration between Amoroso and Boomdabash after "A tre passi da te" (2015); the group explained the decision to collaborare with the singer:

"We are very excited to return to duet with Alessandra an extremely special person for us, not only a friend but a very talented artist with a rare sensitivity. In fact, our first collaboration dates back to 2015 in "A tre passi da te" and already then we had established a great feeling. With Salento in our hearts we wanted to work on this new single, which is rooted in the great love we both have for our homeland."

Amoroso also spoke about the decision to collaborate again:

"It was all very natural, it was like being with family, I am happy with this collaboration that brings us back home and makes us talk about our land, our roots, our Salento. Like the first time, Boomdabash welcomed me with open arms... and made me lots of coffee! It's a beautiful friendship"

== Music video ==
The music video, directed by Fabrizio Conte, was published on June 10, 2019. It was shot in Martina Franca, near Taranto.

== Charts ==
=== Weekly charts ===
Chart (2019)	Peak position
Italy (FIMI)	4
Italy Airplay (EarOne)	1
San Marino (SMRRTV Top 50)	2
Switzerland (Schweizer Hitparade)	84

=== Year-end charts ===
Chart (2019)	Position
Italy (FIMI)	19

== Certifications ==
Region	Certification	Certified units/sales
Italy (FIMI)	3× Platinum	150,000^{‡}
^{‡} Sales+streaming figures based on certification alone.
