= Joanita =

Studio album by Joan Thiele
- Released: 21 March 2025
- Genre: R&B; pop; rock; trip hop
- Length: 39:06
- Label: Numero Uno; Sony Music
- Producer: Joan Thiele; Adel Al Kassem; B-Croma; Callum Connor; Emanuele Triglia; MACE; Hether; Joe Harrison; Zef

Joan Thiele chronology
Atti (2022)	Joanita (2025)

Singles from Joanita
- 1. "Veleno" Released: 6 December 2024; 2. "Eco" Released: 12 February 2025; 3. "Allucinazione" Released: 27 June 2025

Joanita is the second studio album by Italian singer-songwriter Joan Thiele. It was released on 21 February 2025 by Numero Uno and Sony Music.

The album contains the single "Eco", with which the singer competed during the 75th Sanremo Music Festival, finishing in twenty place at the end of the event.

== Background and composition ==
Following the release of her compilation album Atti in 2022, the artist started working on new music, moving to Los Angeles, California in 2024, where she wrote and composed songs with Callum Connor, frontman of the R&B group Free Nationals.

The recording project contains fourteen tracks written by Joan Thiele herself with the collaboration of songwriters and producers, including Adel Al Kassem, B-Croma, Callum Connor, Emanuele Triglia, MACE, Hether, Joe Harrison and Zef. It also includes featured guest vocals by Italian singer Frah Quintale. Furthermore, it is the singer's first album performed entirely in Italian. In an interview with the newspaper Il manifesto, the artist explained the meaning of the project and its genesis:

Over the past three years, I've been working on my new album and wanted to take my time, which is perhaps a bit anachronistic given the speed of the contemporary music scene. In 2020, I also started producing because I realized I needed to work, but above all, to explore sound in order to find something that would unite my various musical identities. So I gave more importance to the music, then recently I've focused on writing. [...] Last year, I was in Los Angeles and worked with Callum Connor, producer and drummer of the Californian R&B band Free Nationals, who also produced "Veleno", the single released last December. There's a very clear common thread: it's a very instrumental album, in the sense that it's full of instruments, even if there's some electronics, because I felt the need to return to "played" music.

== Track listing ==
Joanita track listing
No.	Title	Lyrics	Music	Producer(s)	Length
1.	"La forma liquida"	Alessandra Joan Thiele	Thiele; Emanuele Triglia	Thiele; Triglia	2:37
2.	"Veleno"	Thiele	Thiele; Matthew Merisola; Paul Castelluzzo	Merisola; Castelluzzo	3:19
3.	"Bacio sulla fronte"	Thiele	Thiele; Triglia	Thiele; Triglia	2:44
4.	"Tramonto"	Thiele	Thiele; Piero Umiliani; Triglia	Thiele; Triglia	3:27
5.	"Acqua blu"	Thiele	Thiele; Triglia; Umiliani	Thiele; Triglia	2:39
6.	"Occhi da gangster" (featuring Frah Quintale)	Thiele, Francesco Servidei	Thiele; Rocco Giovannoni; Marco Spaggiari; Umiliani	Thiele; B-Croma	3:43
7.	"Eco"	Thiele	Thiele; Federica Abbate; Simone Benussi; Triglia	Thiele; Triglia	3:14
8.	"Joanita"	Thiele	Thiele; Triglia	Thiele; Triglia	0:57
9.	"Cruz"	Thiele	Thiele; Triglia	Thiele; Triglia	3:02
10.	"XX L.A."	Thiele	Thiele; Castelluzzo; Merisola; Joe Harrison	Castelluzzo; Merisola; Harrison	3:02
11.	"L'invisibile"	Thiele	Thiele; Luca Faraone	Thiele	2:56
12.	"Dea"	Thiele	Thiele; Merisola; Harrison	Merisola; Harrison	3:16
13.	"Volto di donna"	Thiele; Merisola; Adel Al Kassem	Thiele; Kassem; Triglia; Umiliani	Thiele; Kassem; Triglia	3:05
14.	"Pazzerella"	Thiele; Gianna Croce	Thiele	Thiele	1:05

Joanita digital re-issue
No.	Title	Lyrics	Music	Producer(s)	Length
15.	"Allucinazione"	Thiele; Stefano Tognini	Triglia; Tognini	Thiele; Kassem; Triglia; Zef	2:52

== Charts ==
Chart performance for Joanita
Chart (2025)	Peak position
Italian Albums (FIMI)	12
