= Ciclone (song) =

2020 song by Takagi & Ketra

- Official cover

Single by Takagi & Ketra, Elodie, Mariah, Gipsy Kings, Nicolás Reyes and Tonino Baliardo
- Released: 19 June 2020
- Genre: Dance pop; flamenco
- Length: 3:14
- Label: Sony Music
- Songwriters: Davide Petrella; Federica Abbate; Miky La Sensa; Alessandro Merli; Fabio Clemente
- Producer: Takagi & Ketra

Takagi & Ketra singles chronology
"Jambo" (2019)	"Ciclone" (2020)	"Venere e Marte" (2021)

Elodie singles chronology
"Guaranà" (2020)	"Ciclone" (2020)	"Parli parli" (2020)

Mariah singles chronology
"Gracias" (2019)	"Ciclone" (2020)	"Sucio y lento" (2020)

Music video
- "Ciclone" on YouTube

"Ciclone" (lit. 'Cyclone') is a song by Italian music duo Takagi & Ketra, with vocals by Italian singer Elodie, American singer Mariah Angeliq and Catalan group Gipsy Kings. The song was written by Takagi and Ketra with Davide Petrella, Federica Abbate e Miky La Sensa. It was released on 19 June 2020 through Sony Music.

The song peaked at number 9 in the Italian singles chart and was certified double platinum in Italy.

== Music video ==
A music video was released on 1 July 2019 via the YouTube channel of Takagi & Ketra.

The video was directed by YouNuts! and inspired by an iconic scene of the 1996 comedy The Cyclone by Leonardo Pieraccioni, who appears in a cameo. Sergio Forconi reprises his original role as Osvaldo, while the other characters of Libero, Selvaggia and the Spanish dancers are played by Francesco Mandelli, Lorella Boccia, Giulia Pauselli, Federica Panzeri and Valentina Ottaviani.

== Charts ==
=== Weekly charts ===
Weekly chart performance for "Ciclone"
Chart (2020)	Peak position
Italy (FIMI)	9
Italy Airplay (EarOne)	1

=== Year-end charts ===
Year-end chart performance for "Ciclone"
Chart (2020)	Position
Italy (FIMI)	28

== Certifications ==
Region	Certification	Certified units/sales
Italy (FIMI)	2× Platinum	140,000^{‡}
^{‡} Sales+streaming figures based on certification alone.
