= Qué Tienes Tú =

Studio album by Dvicio
- Released: 28 April 2017
- Genre: Pop rock
- Length: 37:47
- Languages: Spanish; English
- Label: Sony Music Spain

Dvicio chronology
Justo Ahora y Siempre (2015)	Qué Tienes Tú (2017)

Singles from Qué Tienes Tú
- 1. "Casi Humano" Released: 17 February 2017; 2. "Idiota" Released: 2017

Qué Tienes Tú is the third studio album by Spanish group Dvicio. It was released on 28 April 2017 by Sony Music Spain. The album includes a collaboration with artist Kany Garcia. The album contains lyrics in both Spanish and English.

== Background ==
Dvicio announced that months earlier before the album came out that they were working on an album that they all have worked on during their time in Mexico. A place that showed them where you can feel happiness and the place to feel loved. During their middle of the year 2016 and ending of the same year received so much awards and recognitions for their hard work. The group's official Twitter page updated a photo that read "Nueva Musica, Muy Pronto. New Music Coming Soon." On January 29, 2017. The group has worked leading to the release of their album, which came out on April 27, 2017.

== Singles ==
The first single from the album was "Casi Humanos". A music video for the song was released on their official YouTube channel.

== Track listing ==
All lyrics are written by Andrés Ceballos, Martín, Luis, Missis and Jorge Ignacio.

Qué Tienes Tú
No.	Title	Producer(s)	Length
1.	"Idiota"	Dvicio; Tom Baker; Franklin Rivero; Juan Carlos Moguel	3:28
2.	"Casi Humanos"	Dvicio; Baker; Thom Russo; Baker	4:02
3.	"Qué Tienes Tú"	Dvicio; Baker; Montaner; Moguel; Baker	3:14
4.	"Quien Soy"	Dvicio; Baker; Rivero; Sebastian Krys	4:16
5.	"No Te Vas"	Dvicio; Baker; Moguel; Rivero; Motiff	3:18
6.	"Sacame De Aqui"	Dvicio; Baker; Moguel; Rivero	3:22
7.	"Invitable"	Dvicio; Baker; Moguel; Rivero	3:02
8.	"Donde Vayas"	Dvicio; Baker; Moguel; Rivero	3:36
9.	"Mia"	Dvicio; Baker; Moguel; Rivero	4:10
10.	"Quedate" (featuring Kany Garcia)	Dvicio; Kany Garcia; Baker; Moguel; Rivero	3:27
11.	"Te Espero"	Dvicio; Baker; Moguel; Rivero	3:50
12.	"Superhéroe"	Dvicio; Baker; Moguel; Rivero	2:58
Total length:			37:47

== Charts ==
=== Weekly charts ===
Weekly chart performance for Qué Tienes Tú
Chart (2017)	Peak position
Mexican Albums (AMPROFON)	5
Spanish Albums (Promusicae)	2

=== Year-end charts ===
Year-end chart performance for Qué Tienes Tú
Chart (2017)	Position
Spanish Albums (PROMUSICAE)	91

== Release history ==
Region	Date	Label	Format
Spain	April 28, 2017	Sony Music Spain	CD, digital download
