= Killer (Baby K and Tiziano Ferro song) =

Single by Baby K featuring Tiziano Ferro

from the album Una seria
- Language: Italian
- Released: 25 January 2013
- Genre: Pop rap
- Length: 3:33
- Label: Sony Music
- Songwriters: Baby K; Tiziano Ferro
- Producers: Tiziano Ferro; Michele Canova Iorfida

Baby K singles chronology
"Sparami" (2012)	"Killer" (2013)	"Roma-Bangkok" (2015)

Tiziano Ferro singles chronology
"L'amore è una cosa semplice" (2011)	"Killer" (2013)	"La fine" (2013)

Music video
- "Killer" on YouTube

"Killer" is a song by Italian singers Baby K and Tiziano Ferro. It was released on 25 January 2013 as the second single from Baby K's first studio album, Una seria.

== Description ==
The lyrics of the song were written by Baby K and Tiziano Ferro. Ferro was also the producer of the album together with Michele Canova Iorfida. The music was composed by Ferro, Baby K and Canova.

The single was released on January 25, 2013, a few days before "La fine", the seventh and last single from Ferro's album L'amore è una cosa semplice.

== Charts ==
=== Weekly charts ===
Weekly chart performance for "Killer"
Chart (2013)	Peak position
Italy (FIMI)	10
Italy Airplay (EarOne)	27

=== Year-end charts ===
Year-end chart performance for "Killer"
Chart (2013)	Position
Italy (FIMI)	58

== Certifications ==
Region	Certification	Certified units/sales
Italy (FIMI)	Platinum	30,000^{‡}
^{‡} Sales+streaming figures based on certification alone.
