= Jambo (Takagi & Ketra song) =

2019 song by Takagi & Ketra

Single by Takagi & Ketra featuring OMI & Giusy Ferreri
- Released: 21 June 2019
- Genre: Afrobeat; dancehall reggae
- Length: 2:37
- Label: Columbia, Sony Music
- Songwriters: Takagi; Ketra; Cheope; Clifton Dillon; Federica Abbate; Omar Samuel Pasley

Takagi & Ketra singles chronology
"La luna e la gatta" (2019)	"Jambo" (2019)	"Ciclone" (2020)

Omi singles chronology
"As Long As I'm With You" (2018)	"Jambo" (2019)	"Better for Ya" (2019)

Giusy Ferreri singles chronology
"Le cose che canto" (2019)	"Jambo" (2019)	"Momenti perfetti" (2019)

Music video
- "Jambo" on YouTube

"Jambo" is a 2019 bilingual song in English and Italian by Takagi & Ketra, featuring additional vocals by Jamaican singer OMI and Italian singer Giusy Ferreri. Written by Takagi and Ketra in addition to Cheope, Clifton Dillon, Federica Abbate, and Omar Samuel Pasley (OMI), it as an adaptation of the Nicolette song "O Si Nene".

The song was particularly successful in Italy, reaching number 1 in the Italian Singles Chart for 2 weeks, with a total 28 weeks in the Italian charts. It was certified 4× platinum in Italy. It also charted in Switzerland, reaching number 11.

== Music video ==
A music video was released on 14 June 2019 on the YouTube channel of Takagi and Ketra, and has attracted 125 million views on YouTube as of June 2021. The video was directed by Gaetano Morbioli and starring Sherrie Silver as the Queen (also main choreographer) and participation of Silverbeat. It was filmed in various locations in Jamaica, Tanzania and Rwanda.

== Charts ==
Chart (2019)	Peak position
Italy (FIMI)	1
Italy Airplay (EarOne)	1
Switzerland (Schweizer Hitparade)	11

== Certifications ==
Region	Certification	Certified units/sales
Italy (FIMI)	4× Platinum	280,000^{‡}
Switzerland (IFPI Switzerland)	Platinum	20,000^{‡}
^{‡} Sales+streaming figures based on certification alone.
