= Da sola/In the Night =

2018 song by Takagi & Ketra

- Official cover

Single by Takagi & Ketra featuring Tommaso Paradiso and Elisa
- Released: 12 January 2018
- Genre: Disco-pop
- Length: 3:10
- Label: Sony Music
- Composers: Takagi & Ketra; Tommaso Paradiso; Davide Petrella
- Lyricists: Tommaso Paradiso; Davide Petrella
- Producers: Takagi & Ketra

Takagi & Ketra singles chronology
"L'esercito del selfie" (2017)	"Da sola/In the Night" (2018)	"Amore e capoeira" (2018)

Tommaso Paradiso singles chronology
"Da sola/In the Night" (2018)	"Stanza singola" (2019)

Elisa singles chronology
"Piccola anima" (2017)	"Da sola/In the Night" (2018)	"Will We Be Strangers" (2018)

Music video
- "Da sola/In the Night" on YouTube

"Da sola/In the Night" is a 2018 song by musical duo Takagi & Ketra, with featured vocals by Italian singers Tommaso Paradiso and Elisa. Written by Takagi & Ketra, Paradiso and Davide Petrella, it was released by Sony Music on 12 January 2018.

The song peaked at number 12 in the Italian singles chart and was certified platinum in Italy.

== Music video ==
A music video of "Da sola/In the Night", directed by Gaetano Morbioli, was released on 15 January 2018 via the YouTube channel of Takagi & Ketra.

== Charts ==
=== Weekly charts ===
Weekly chart performance for "Da sola/In the Night"
Chart (2018)	Peak position
Italy (FIMI)	12
Italy (EarOne Airplay)	3

=== Year-end charts ===
Year-end chart performance for "Da sola/In the Night"
Chart (2018)	Position
Italy (FIMI)	76

== Certifications ==
Region	Certification	Certified units/sales
Italy (FIMI)	Platinum	50,000^{‡}
^{‡} Sales+streaming figures based on certification alone.
