= La luna e la gatta =

2019 song by Takagi & Ketra

- Official cover

Single by Takagi & Ketra featuring Tommaso Paradiso, Jovanotti and Calcutta
- Released: 1 March 2019
- Length: 3:11
- Label: Sony Music
- Songwriters: Tommaso Paradiso; Lorenzo Cherubini; Edoardo D'Erme; Alessandro Merli; Fabio Clemente
- Producers: Takagi & Ketra

Takagi & Ketra singles chronology
"Amore e capoeira" (2018)	"La luna e la gatta" (2019)	"Jambo" (2019)

Tommaso Paradiso singles chronology
"Stanza singola" (2019)	"La luna e la gatta" (2019)	"Non avere paura" (2019)

Jovanotti singles chronology
"Chiaro di luna" (2018)	"La luna e la gatta" (2019)	"Nuova era" (2019)

Calcutta singles chronology
"La musica italiana" (2019)	"La luna e la gatta" (2019)	"Due punti" (2019)

Music video
- "La luna e la gatta" on YouTube

"La luna e la gatta" is a song by Italian record producers Takagi & Ketra, with featured vocals by Italian singers Tommaso Paradiso, Jovanotti and Calcutta. It was released by Sony Music on 1 March 2019.

The song peaked at number 9 on the Italian singles chart and was certified double platinum in Italy.

== Music video ==
A music video of "La luna e la gatta", directed by Gaetano Morbioli, was released on 21 March 2019 via the YouTube channel of Takagi & Ketra.

== Track listing ==
Digital download
No.	Title	Length
1.	"La luna e la gatta"	3:11

10"
No.	Title	Length
1.	"La luna e la gatta"	3:11
2.	"La luna e la gatta (Instrumental)"	3:11

== Charts ==
=== Weekly charts ===
Weekly chart performance for "La luna e la gatta"
Chart (2019)	Peak position
Italy (FIMI)	9
Italy Airplay (EarOne)	1

=== Year-end charts ===
Year-end chart performance for "La luna e la gatta"
Chart (2019)	Position
Italy (FIMI)	48

== Certifications ==
Region	Certification	Certified units/sales
Italy (FIMI)	2× Platinum	100,000^{‡}
^{‡} Sales+streaming figures based on certification alone.
