= Oroscopo (song) =

2016 song by Calcutta

- Official cover

Single by Calcutta featuring Takagi & Ketra
- Released: 12 May 2016
- Length: 3:18
- Label: Bomba Dischi
- Songwriter: Edoardo D'Erme
- Producer: Takagi & Ketra

Calcutta singles chronology
"Frosinone" (2015)	"Oroscopo" (2016)	"Orgasmo" (2017)

Takagi & Ketra singles chronology
"Oroscopo" (2016)	"L'esercito del selfie" (2017)

Music video
- "Oroscopo" on YouTube

"Oroscopo" is a song written and recorded by Italian singer-songwriter Calcutta, featuring record producers Takagi & Ketra. It was released on 12 May 2016 by Bomba Dischi.

The song peaked at number 80 in the Italian singles chart and was certified triple platinum in Italy. Since its release, Calcutta considered the song as something which did not represent himself.

== Music video ==
A music video for "Oroscopo", directed by Francesco Lettieri, was released on 12 June 2016 via the YouTube channel of Bomba Dischi.

== Charts ==
Weekly chart performance for "Oroscopo"
Chart (2018)	Peak position
Italy (FIMI)	80

== Certifications ==
Region	Certification	Certified units/sales
Italy (FIMI)	3× Platinum	150,000^{‡}
^{‡} Sales+streaming figures based on certification alone.
