= L'esercito del selfie =

2017 song by Takagi & Ketra

- Official cover

Single by Takagi & Ketra featuring Lorenzo Fragola and Arisa
- Released: 16 June 2017
- Length: 3:07
- Label: Sony Music
- Composers: Takagi & Ketra; Tommaso Paradiso
- Lyricist: Tommaso Paradiso
- Producers: Takagi & Ketra

Takagi & Ketra singles chronology
"Oroscopo" (2016)	"L'esercito del selfie" (2017)	"Da sola/In the Night" (2018)

Lorenzo Fragola singles chronology
"D'improvviso" (2016)	"L'esercito del selfie" (2017)	"Bengala" (2018)

Arisa singles chronology
"Ho perso il mio amore" (2017)	"L'esercito del selfie" (2017)	"Ho cambiato i piani" (2017)

Music video
- "L'esercito del selfie" on YouTube

"L'esercito del selfie" (lit. 'The selfie army') is a 2017 song by musical duo Takagi & Ketra, with vocals by Italian singers Lorenzo Fragola and Arisa. Written by Takagi and Ketra with Tommaso Paradiso, it was released on 16 June 2017.

The song peaked at number 4 in the Italian singles chart and was certified triple platinum in Italy.

== Music video ==
A music video was released on 17 June 2017 via the YouTube channel of Takagi & Ketra. The video, starring Francesco Mandelli, Arisa and Pippo Baudo as a special guest, was directed by Gaetano Morbioli.

== Charts ==
Chart (2017)	Peak position
Italy (FIMI)	4
Italy Airplay (EarOne)	2
Switzerland (Schweizer Hitparade)	53

== Certifications ==
Region	Certification	Certified units/sales
Italy (FIMI)	3× Platinum	150,000^{‡}
^{‡} Sales+streaming figures based on certification alone.
