= Voglio ballare con te =

Single by Baby K featuring Andrés Dvicio

from the album Icona
- Released: 2 June 2017
- Genre: Latin pop
- Length: 2:46
- Label: Sony Music
- Producers: Takagi; Mr. Ketra

Baby K singles chronology
"Roma-Bangkok" (2015)	"Voglio ballare con te" (2017)	"Aspettavo solo te" (2017)

Andrés Dvicio singles chronology
"A Veces" (2016)	"Voglio ballare con te" (2017)

Music video
- "Voglio ballare con te" on YouTube

"Voglio ballare con te" (English: "I want to dance with you") is a song recorded by Italian rapper Baby K, with vocals by Spanish singer Andrés Dvicio, for her third studio album Icona. The song was released on 2 June 2017, through Sony Music Italy. It was produced by Takagi and Mr Ketra, who also produced the singer's smash-hit "Roma Bangkok".

== Commercial performance ==
In Italy, "Voglio ballare con te" debuted at number 51, and later peaked at number 2. The song reached the triple platinum certification in that territory for selling over 150,000 copies. It also peaked at number 20 in Switzerland, marking Baby K's second entry and highest-charting song on the chart.

== Spanish version ==
"Locos Valientes", the Spanish-language version of the song, was released on September 8, 2017. The song became Baby K's second Spanish song, following "Roma-Bangkok" featuring Giusy Ferreri or Lali.

== Charts ==
=== Weekly charts ===
Chart (2017)	Peak position
Italy (FIMI)	2
Switzerland (Schweizer Hitparade)	20

=== Year-end charts ===
Chart (2017)	Position
Italy (FIMI)	13

== Certifications ==
Region	Certification	Certified units/sales
Italy (FIMI)	5× Platinum	250,000^{‡}
Switzerland (IFPI Switzerland)	Gold	10,000^{‡}
^{‡} Sales+streaming figures based on certification alone.

== Release history ==
Region	Date	Format	Label	Ref.
Worldwide	2 June 2017	Digital download	Sony Music	
Italy	2 June 2017	Contemporary hit radio	Sony Music	
