= Amore e capoeira =

2018 song by Takagi & Ketra

- Official cover

Single by Takagi & Ketra featuring Giusy Ferreri and Sean Kingston
- Released: 1 June 2018
- Genre: Dancehall
- Length: 2:52
- Label: Sony Music
- Composers: Takagi & Ketra; Federica Abbate
- Lyricists: Federica Abbate; Sean Kingston
- Producers: Takagi & Ketra

Takagi & Ketra singles chronology
"Da sola/In the Night" (2018)	"Amore e capoeira" (2018)	"La luna e la gatta" (2019)

Giusy Ferreri singles chronology
"L'amore mi perseguita" (2017)	"Amore e capoeira" (2018)	"Le cose che canto" (2019)

Sean Kingston singles chronology
"Holding Back" (2017)	"Amore e capoeira" (2018)	"Peace of Mind" (2019)

Music video
- "Amore e capoeira" on YouTube

"Amore e capoeira" (lit. 'Love and capoeira') is a 2018 song by musical duo Takagi & Ketra, with featured vocals by Italian singer Giusy Ferreri and Sean Kingston. Written by Takagi and Ketra with Federica Abbate, it was released on 1 June 2018.

The song peaked at number 1 in the Italian singles chart and was certified quintuple platinum in Italy.

== Music video ==
A music video was released on 21 June 2018 via the YouTube channel of Takagi & Ketra. The video was directed by Gaetano Morbioli and shot in Rio de Janeiro.

== Charts ==
=== Weekly charts ===
Weekly chart performance for "Amore e capoeira"
Chart (2018)	Peak position
Italy (FIMI)	1
Italy Airplay (EarOne)	1
Switzerland (Schweizer Hitparade)	2

=== Year-end charts ===
Year-end chart performance for "Amore e capoeira"
Chart (2018)	Position
Italy (FIMI)	1
Switzerland (Schweizer Hitparade)	17

== Certifications ==
Region	Certification	Certified units/sales
Italy (FIMI)	5× Platinum	250,000^{‡}
Switzerland (IFPI Switzerland)	Platinum	20,000^{‡}
^{‡} Sales+streaming figures based on certification alone.
