= Dvicio =

Spanish Latin-pop group

- Origin: Spain
- Genre: Latin pop
- Occupations: Musicians, songwriters
- Instruments: Vocals, drums, guitar, bass, bass guitar
- Years active: 2009–2022
- Label: Sony Music Spain
- Members: Andrés Ceballos; Martín Ceballos; Nacho Gotor; Alberto González; Luis Gonzalvo
- Website: dvicio.com

Dvicio, stylised as DVICIO and also known as just DV, is a Spanish Latin pop group. Dvicio signed to Sony Music Spain.

== History ==
Dvicio stated that during their childhood, the group were close friends who decided to form a group. The beginnings of Dvicio go back to 2009 when the present band members performed under the name Tiempo Límite, encouraged by the success of the popular band El Canto del Loco. As Tiempo Límite, they had minor hits with "Detrás de mis miedos" and "Dueña de mi mente".

=== 2009–2012: Beginnings and forming Tiempo Limite ===
While growing up in Madrid, Dvicio started their career as the group Tiempo Limite. Under this name, they released songs like "Duena de Mi Mente" and "Detras de Mis Miedos". In 2011, they took part in a music competition organized by ABC Punto Radio by sending their demo cover of the song "Titanium" and won the top prize.

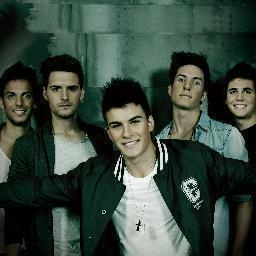
Dvicio during promotion of 2012

=== 2013–2014: Dvicio, Justo Ahora ===
In 2013 they changed their group name to Dvicio and after signing with Sony Music Spain, released their single "Paraiso" in 2014. The song, already popular on YouTube, gained more notice when employees of the fast food chain McDonald's in Spain performed the song in a flash mob video that went viral. McDonald's Spain went on to use "Paraiso" in a series of promotional ads, also releasing tutorial videos encouraging everybody to share in the dance. "Paraiso", recorded in Mexico, also became the first charting hit of the band.

=== 2015-2016: Justo Ahora y Siempre, Tours and Latin Grammy's ===
Their second album, Justo Ahora y Siempre, was released in 2016, featuring the songs "Electricidad", "Paraiso" (English Version), "Enamórate" (English Version), and "Qué Mas Puedo Pedir" (Inédita 2015). "Nada" featuring Leslie Grace was also released around this time. In 2016, Dvicio went on small tour for their second album around Spain. There were also conformed artist that appeared at the Latin Grammys on September 9, 2016, alongside Jesse y Joy, Lucero, Lila Downs, Idina Menzel, and Aida Cuevas.

=== 2017: Qué Tienes Tú and touring ===
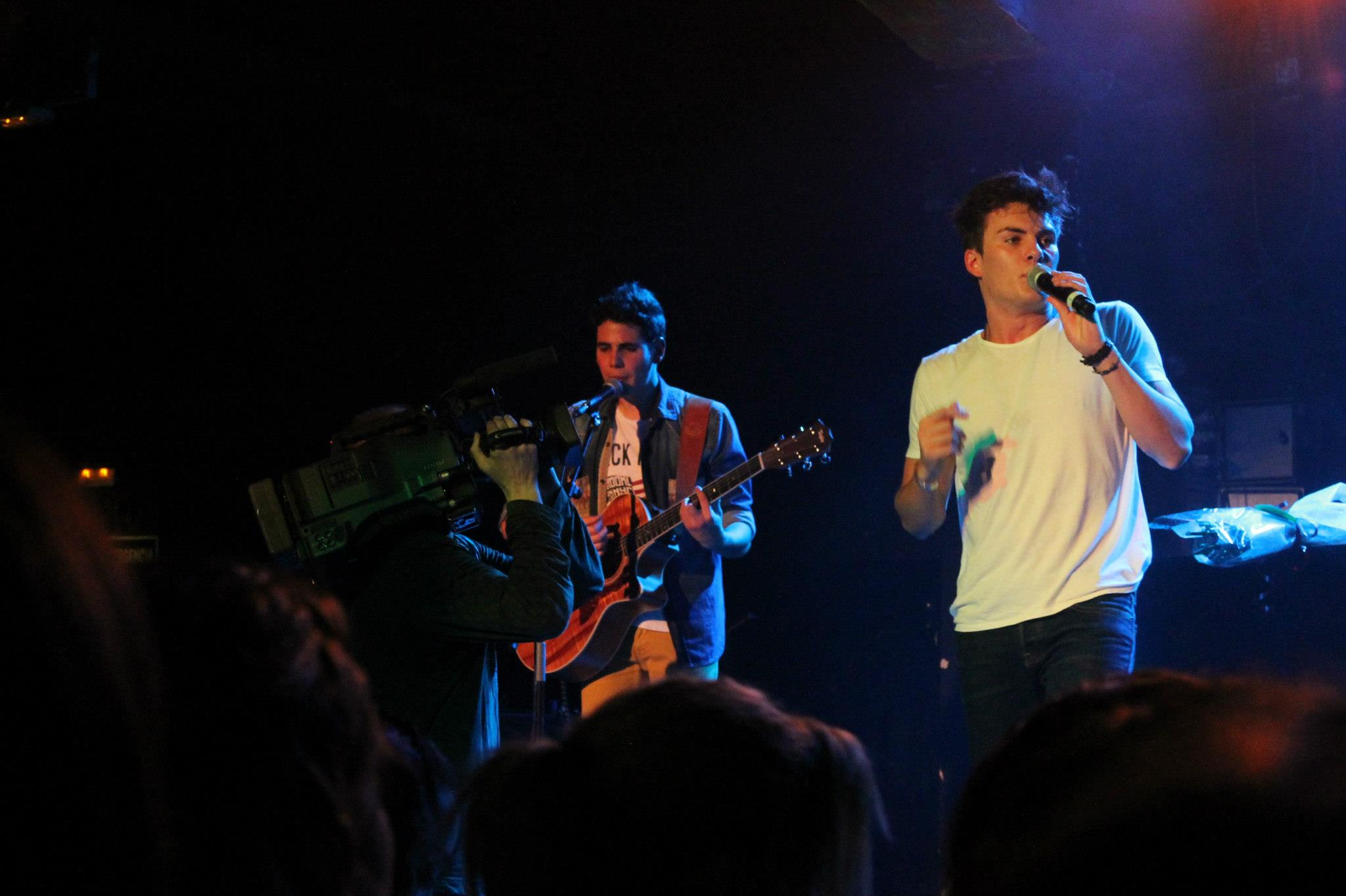
DVICIO concierto Sala CATS de Madrid, 2013

On April 27, Dvicio released their third studio album, Qué Tienes Tú. It includes the songs "Idiota", "Casi Humanos" and "Quédate" (with Kany García). Dvicio toured the Spanish cities of Madrid, Bilbao, Barcelona. Dvicio are set to tour Mexico and South America. They were also special guest for the Portuguese group D.A.M.A in the concert in Madrid in the Teatro Barcelo, Lead member Andrés Ceballos has collaborated with them that they also got his band up their. Dvicio was on the cover of TVEO magazine in May 2017. Dvicio shared the stage with Mexican artist Mario Bautista at the Auditorio Nacional in México DF on May 27. Dvicio's single "Casi Humanos" stayed in the top 50 of the Spanish singles chart for 11 weeks, while the album entered at number 2 on the Spanish albums chart. Dvicio has also collaborated with Thailand artist Saksit Vejsupaporn also known as (ToR+ Saksit) on the song called "No Te Vas" which was released on Jun 6, 2017 through iTunes and is ranking 85 from Global Top 200's. On July 21, DVICIO released a single of a remix of the song "Casi Humanos" known as Casi Humanos Los Tailors Remix On July 24, DVICIO opened up a virtual store in Mexico. On December 4, 2017, DVICIO toured Mexico, Argentina and Chile.

=== 2018: Touring, collaborating and DVCovers ===
On February 8, 2018, Dvicio launched the DV Covers event, challenging fans to upload a video of themselves singing a DVICIO song under the hashtag #DVCOVERS. A winner was to be chosen and to receive an unspecified prize. On February 14, Dvicio was featured on a cover of "Enamórate" alongside Argentinean group Agapornis. On February 25, Dvicio announced that they would tour Peru for the first time, visiting Lima. On March 21, 2018, Dvicio announced the winner of the DVCovers competition as Nicole from Peru. On March 22, 2018, Dvicio hinted at a future collaboration with the group Reik if they accepted through Twitter. Dvicio also announced that they would visit the cities of Quito and Guayaquil in Ecuador on tour. On May 4, 2018, Dvicio, released their duet with the Mexican group Reik and also filmed its music video in Mexico. On September 27, Dvicio released a new single called "5 Sentidos" (featuring Taburete) as well with a music video the same day.

=== 2019: Successful singles "Valeria", "Brasilera", "Palma con Palma" and touring ===
On March 8, 2019, Dvicio released their single "Valeria" and an accompanying music video. On June 7, 2019, Dvicio released another single for the year with "Brasilera", with a video featuring Andrés Ceballos of the group as the protagonist and model Sasha Meneghel as the lead female protagonist. On July 25, 2019, Dvicio announced that their song "5 Sentidos" has become double platinum. On July 26, they released the single "Palma con Palma" with a music video, as well another set of tour dates for the Fall, while announcing that "Palma con Palma" would be used to close out the FIBA 2019 hosted in China.

=== 2020–2022: Impulso ===
Dvicio came out with their third new album Impulso on March 20. The album contained single songs "Valeria", "Dosis", and "5 Sentidos". In 2022, the band announced their separation.

== Members ==
- Andrés Ceballos Sánchez - Is the Leader and Vocals, was born August 31, 1992 (age 34)
- Martín Ceballos Sánchez - Bass Guitar, was born March 27, 1991 (age 35)
- Nacho Gotor - Guitar, was born May 1, 1990 (age 36)
- Alberto "Missis" González - Guitar, was born June 18, 1990 (age 36)
- Luis Gonzalvo - Drums, was born February 13, 1990 (age 36)

== Discography ==
=== Albums ===
Title	Details	Peak chart positions		Certifications
Title	Details	SPN	MEX	Certifications
Justo Ahora	Released: 8 September 2014; Label: Sony Music, Spain; Formats: CD, digital download	4	—	AMPROFON: Gold
Qué Tienes Tú	Released: 28 April 2017; Label: Sony Music, Spain; Formats: CD, digital download	2	5	AMPROFON: Gold
Impulso	Released: 19 March 2020; Label: Sony Music, Spain; Formats: CD, digital download	1	—	

=== Compilation album ===
Title	Details
Justo Ahora y Siempre	Released: 25 September 2015; Label: Sony Music, Spain; Format: CD, digital download

=== Singles ===
List of singles as lead artist, with selected chart positions, showing year released and album name
Title	Year	Peaks			Certifications	Album
Title	Year	SPA	ARG	MEX	Certifications	Album
"Paraiso"	2014	3	—	—	AMPROFON: Gold	Justo Ahora
"Justo Ahora"	2014	—	—	—		Justo Ahora
"Nada" (featuring Leslie Grace)	2015	—	—	—		Non-album single
"Enamorate"	2015	52	—	34	AMPROFON: Gold	Justo Ahora y Siempre
"Casi Humanos"	2017	60	—	6	AMPROFON: Platinum+Gold	Qué Tienes Tú
"Idiota"	2017	—	—	—		Qué Tienes Tú
"No Te Vas"	2017	—	—	—		Qué Tienes Tú
"Qué Tienes Tú" (featuring Jesús Reik and Mau y Ricky)	2018	28	—	16	PROMUSICAE: 2× Platinum; AMPROFON: Platinum	Qué Tienes Tú
"5 Sentidos" (featuring Taburete)	2018	36	—	—	PROMUSICAE: 2× Platinum	Impulso
"Valeria" (solo or with Matisse)	2019	— (Note: "Valeria" did not enter the Spain Top 100 Singles chart, but peaked at number 15 on the Spain Top 50 Airplay chart.)	—	—		Impulso
"Brasilera"	2019	—	—	—		Non-album singles
"Palma con Palma"	2019	—	—	—		Non-album singles
"Dosis" (with ChocQuibTown and Reik)	2019	62	—	— (Note: "Dosis" did not enter the Billboard Mexico Airplay chart, but peaked at number 19 on the Mexico Pop Espanol Airplay chart.)	PROMUSICAE: Platinum	Impulso
"Sobrenatural" (featuring Farina)	2020	—	—	—		Impulso
"Capítulos"	2020	— (Note: "Capítulos" did not enter the Spain Top 100 Singles chart, but peaked at number nine on the Spain Top 50 Airplay chart.)	—	—		Impulso
"Soy de Volar" (with Lali)	2020	—	80	—	PROMUSICAE: Gold	Impulso
"Epiphany" (with Nil Moliner)	2021	—	—	—		Impulso
"—" denotes a recording that did not chart or was not released in that territory.

=== Featured songs ===
Year	Artist	Title	Album
2017	Agapornis	"Enamorate" (featuring Dvicio)	Non-album single
2020	Resistiré 2020	"Resistire" (featuring various artists)	Non-album single
2020	Matisse	"Eres Tú" (El Viaje de Matisse) (featuring Dvicio)	Non-album single

=== Other charted songs ===
Year	Title	Peak position	Album
2017	"No Te Vas" (featuring ToR+ Saksit)	85	Non-album single

== Tours ==
These are tours for the albums Justo Ahora y Que Tienes Tu, so far they have gone to 5 countries and 16 cities in total. Dvicio has gone on small tour with in the ranges of 2015 and 2016. They have sold out the Teatro Metropólitan in Mexico for 3 times in a row since the start of their career. Mexico tour has updated dates for their upcoming tour for the country.

=== Justo Ahora Tour ===
Date	City	Country	Venue
August 20, 2015	Murcia	Spain	Auditorio Municipal Parque de Fofó
August 22, 2015	San Javier	Spain	Auditorio Parque Almansa
November 5, 2015	Madrid	Spain	Sala But
November 6, 2015	Malaga	Spain	Sala Paris 15
November 12, 2015	Santiago de Compostela	Spain	Sala Capitol
November 14, 2015	Santander	Spain	Escenario Santander (ecam)
November 26, 2015	Barcelona	Spain	Bikini
November 28, 2015	Seville	Spain	Antique Theatro

=== Justo Ahora y Siempre Tour ===
Date	City	Country	Venue
June 22, 2016	Mexico City	Mexico	Teatro Metropólitan
June 24, 2016	Monterrey	Mexico	Auditorio Banamex
June 27, 2016	Puebla	Mexico	Complejo Cultural Universitario (Puebla)
July 28, 2016	Mexico City	Mexico	Teatro Metropólitan
August 26, 2016	Ferrol	Spain	Praza De España

==== Music Fest Events ====
These are tours they were part of or open up as act for the artist. These 2 events Fiestas Ascensión 2015 and Coca-Cola Music Experience: On The Beach 2015 took place in Spain.

Date	City	Country	Event	Venue	Artists
May 13–17, 2015	Santiago de Compostela	Spain	Fiestas Ascensión 2015	Plaza de la Quintana	Kitty, Daisy & Lewis, La Pegatina, Auryn, Emir Kusturica, Moreno Veloso, Guadi Galego, TNSO, and Néstor Pardo, DVICIO
August 1, 2015	El Campello	Spain	Coca-Cola Music Experience: On The Beach 2015	Beach	Sofía Reyes, DVICIO, Henry Mendez, Xriz, Sweet California, Maverick, Clover, Adrián Rodríguez, El Viaje de Elliot, MARIO JEFFERSON, Bromas Aparte, Curricé, Baby Noel, Kenya&Kat
November 12, 2017	Mexico City	Mexico	Aerofest 2017	Fronton Mexico	DVICIO, Mario Bautista, URBAND 5, URBAND5, and Somos May
August 10, 2018	Asturias	Spain	Los40 Summer Live2018	Playa Les Conserveres	Ana Mena, Bombai, and REYKO

=== Casi Humanos Tour ===
Date	City	Country	Venue
Beginning tour
May 11, 2017	Madrid	Spain	Teatro Barceló
May 12, 2017	Bilbao	Spain	Sala Santana 27
May 13, 2017	Barcelona	Spain	Sala Bikini
May 31, 2017	Mexico City	Mexico	Teatro Metropólitan
June 2, 2017	San Luis Potosí	Mexico	Plaza de Toros
June 15, 2017	Mayagüez	Puerto Rico	Mayagüez Mall
June 16, 2017	San Juan	Puerto Rico	Mall of San Juan
June 21, 2017	Buenos Aires	Argentina	La Trastienda Samsung
July 15, 2017	Bangkok	Thailand	Muang Thai Gmm Live House
Spain tour starts
July 20, 2017	Viscaya	Spain	TBA
July 21, 2017	Valencia	Spain	TBA
July 21, 2017	Madrid	Spain	Sala Arena (Ex-Heineken)
July 22, 2017	Calatayud	Spain	Plaza de Toros
August 17, 2017	Marbella	Spain	La Cantera, Auditorio de Marbella / Starlite Festival
August 26, 2017	Fuente Álamo de Murcia	Spain	Auditorio Municipal Fuente Álamo
September 1, 2017	Palma de Mallorca	Spain	Auditorium de Palma
September 8, 2017	Melilla	Spain	TBA
Mexico tour starts
October 19, 2017	Nayarit	Mexico	Nuevo Vallarta
October 20, 2017	Querétaro	Mexico	Auditorio Josefa Ortiz de Domínguez
October 21, 2017	Ciudad de Mexico	Mexico	Pepsi Center WTC
October 25, 2017	Toluca	Mexico	Teatro Morelos
October 26, 2017	Aguascalientes	Mexico	Palenque Feria de San Marcos
October 27, 2017	León	Mexico	Domo de la Feria
October 28, 2017	San Luis Potosí	Mexico	Plaza de Toros
November 3, 2017	Zapopan, Jalisco	Mexico	Calle 2
November 4, 2017	Mérida	Mexico	Coliseo Yucatán
November 9, 2017	Tijuana	Mexico	B.C.N -Plaza de Toros Caliente
November 10, 2017	Monterrey	Mexico	Cintermex
November 11, 2017	Puebla	Mexico	Acropolis Puebla
Casi Humanos Tour 2018
April 27, 2018	Quito	Peru	Plaza De Toros Belmonte
April 28, 2018	Guayaquil	Peru	Centro De Convenciones De Guayaquil
April 30, 2018	Lima	Peru	C.C. Maria Angola
May 3, 2018	Guayaquil	Peru	Teatro Centro De Arte
May 4, 2018	Quito	Peru	Teatro Bolivar
May 31, 2018	Mexico City	Mexico	Pepsi Center WTC
June 27, 2018	Ourense	Spain	Orense
July 21, 2018	Jaen, Nueva Ecija	Spain	Mengibar
July 22, 2018	Malaga	Spain	Torre del Mar
July 23, 2018	Badajoz	Spain	Parque del Guadiana
July 24, 2018	Cadiz	Spain	San Fernando
July 25, 2018	Cadiz	Spain	Algeciras
July 26, 2018	Almeria	Spain	Pulpi
July 28, 2018	Cantabria	Spain	Torrelavega
July 30, 2018	Castellón	Spain	Peniscola
August 2, 2018	Mallorca	Spain	Playa de Ses Fontanelles de Palma
August 4, 2018	A Coruña	Spain	Ribeira
August 11, 2018	Salamanca	Spain	CARBAJOSA, Recinto de Espectaculos
August 12, 2018	San Sebastián	Spain	Sagüés
August 31, 2018	Aranjuez	Spain	Plaza de Parejas
September 8, 2018	Madrid	Spain	WiZink Center
September 8, 2018	Madrid	Spain	Pozuelo de Alarcon
September 14, 2018	Madrid	Spain	Mostelos
49 dates	43 cities	6 countries	47 venues

== Filmography ==
=== Music videos ===
Song	Year	Director	Album
"Paraiso"	2014	Willy Rodríguez	Justo Ahora
"Justo Ahora"	2014	Willy Rodríguez	Justo Ahora
"Nada (feat. Leslie Grace)"	2015	Willy Rodríguez	Nada - Single
"Enamorate"	2015	Willy Rodríguez	Justo Ahora y Siempre
"Casi Humanos"	2017	Willy Rodríguez	Que Tienes Tu
"No Te Vas"	2017	Willy Rodríguez	Que Tienes Tu

=== Television appearances ===
Year	Title	Network	Notes	Ref
2016	Latin Grammy	Univision	Were Nominated	
2017	Sale el Sol	imagentv	Sang Live, Interview	
2017	Excelsior TV	imagentv	Interview	
2017	Mojoe	Unicable	Sang Live	
2017	¡Despierta América!	Univision	Sang Live	
2017	Raymond y sus amigos	Telemundo	Interview	
2017	Acceso Total	Telemundo	with Kany Garcia	
2017	No es un Sábado Cualquiera	Tev1	Sang Live	
2017	Plan B (Talk Show)	Unicable	Sang Live	
2017	IN DA HOUSE	Nu Music TV	Sang Live, Interview	
2017	Tu Musica Hoy	TMH (YT)	Interview	
2017	Gira Déjate Lleva	Cadena Dial	Sanged Live	
2017	Fantastic Duo	RTVE	Sanged Live	
2017	Eazy FM 105.5	Tailandia	Interview	
2017	Un Nuevo Dia	Telemundo	Interview	
2017	Tu It Girl	Taconeras	Interview	
2017	El Mundo	N/A	Interview	
2017	Dial Tal Cual	Cadena Dial	Interview	
2017	Pecado Venial	RMS México	Sanged Live, Interview	

== Awards and nominations ==
=== Premios 40 Principales ===
The Premios 40 Principales are music awards presented by the radio station Los 40 Principales. The awards are presented at a gala, with funds raised being donated to charities. The awards are presented based on a popular vote by music lovers in Spain.

Year	Category	Song	Results
2014	Mejor artista revelación nacional	Justo ahora	Won
2014	Mejor videoclip nacional	Paraíso	Nominated
2015	Mejor canción nacional	Enamórate	Nominated

=== Premios Dial ===
The Premios Dial are winners who coincide the great advantage through Spanish radio Cadena Dial from 1996 until the acts of the artist and groups in the native language of Spanish, from the year they have won in this award.

Year	Category	Song	Results
2015	Premio 25 aniversario Cadena Dial	Justo ahora	Won

=== Latin Grammy ===
During the year 2016 the group was nominated in the category of Best Large Music Video.

Year	Category	Song	Results
2016	Best Long Form Video	Justo Ahora y Siempre	Nominated

=== Premios Juventud ===
Dvicio was nominated in 2016 for Producers Choice Award.

Year	Category	Artist	Results
2016	Producers Choice Award	Themselves	Nominated
