= Kiss Kiss Bang Bang (Baby K album) =

Studio album by Baby K
- Released: 11 September 2015
- Recorded: 2014
- Genre: Hip hop; pop rap
- Length: 45:55
- Language: Italian, English
- Label: Sony Music
- Producer: Takagi & Ketra

Baby K chronology
Una seria (2013)	Kiss Kiss Bang Bang (2015)	Icona (2018)

Singles from Kiss Kiss Bang Bang
- 1. "Anna Wintour" Released: June 8, 2015; 2. "Roma-Bangkok" Released: June 19, 2015; 3. "Chiudo gli occhi e salto" Released: October 23, 2015; 4. "Venerdí" Released: June 17, 2016

Kiss Kiss Bang Bang is the second studio album by Italian singer and rapper Baby K, released on 11 September 2015 by Sony Music, produced by the Italian duo Takagi & Ketra.

== Description ==
Produced by the duo Takagi & Ketra, the album was preceded by the singles "Anna Wintour" and most notably "Roma-Bangkok", featuring Italian singer Giusy Ferreri, that peaked at number 1 on the Italian singles' chart and was certified nine-platinums, becoming the best-selling single in Italy in 2015.

== Track listing ==
No.	Title	Length
1.	"Kiss Kiss Bang Bang"	3:12
2.	"Anna Wintour"	3:32
3.	"Roma-Bangkok" (featuring Giusy Ferreri)	2:54
4.	"Dindi"	2:48
5.	"Chiudo gli occhi e salto" (featuring Federica Abbate)	3:49
6.	"Lasciati le Sneakers"	3:22
7.	"Super mega iper"	3:26
8.	"Fakeness" (featuring Madh)	3:48
9.	"Chiedi alla Luna"	3:00
10.	"Hipster Love"	3:12
11.	"Venerdí"	2:33
12.	"Licenza di uccidere" (featuring Fred De Palma and 2P)	3:25
13.	"Ola"	3:08
14.	"Brucia"	3:46

== Charts ==
Weekly chart performance for Kiss Kiss Bang Bang
Chart (2015)	Peak position
Italian Albums (FIMI)	4
Swiss Albums (Schweizer Hitparade)	89
