= Franco126 =

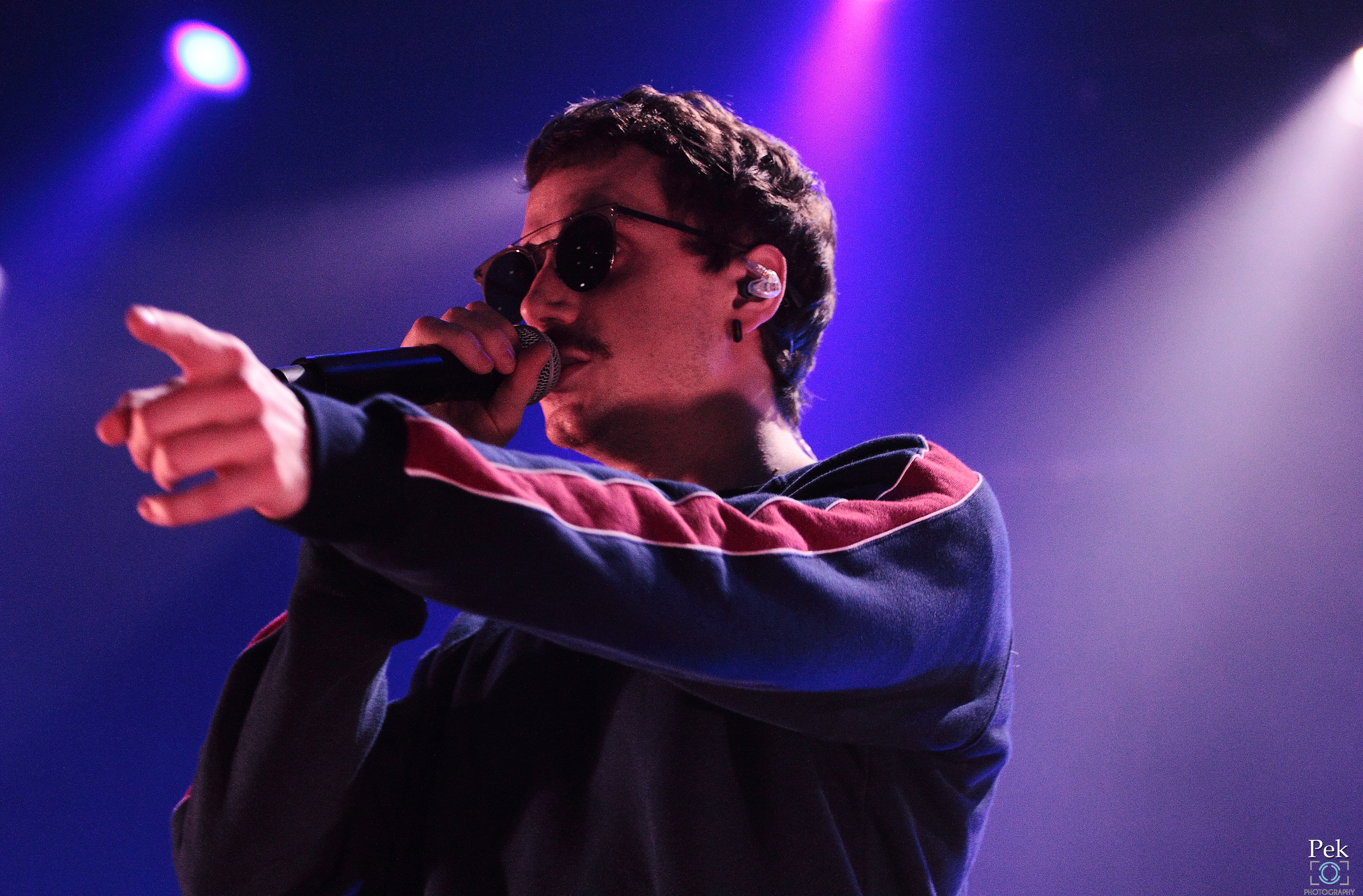
- Franco126 in February 2018

Background information
- Born: Federico Bertollini; 4 July 1992 (age 34); Rome, Italy
- Genres: Indie pop; pop rap
- Occupations: Singer; songwriter; rapper
- Instrument: Vocals
- Years active: 2016–present
- Label: Bomba Dischi

Federico Bertollini (born 4 July 1992), better known as Franco126, is an Italian singer, songwriter and rapper.

He rose to fame in 2017, as part of the duo Carl Brave x Franco126, with the album Polaroid. Two years later, he released his first solo studio album, Stanza singola, which includes the single with the same title, recorded as a duet with Tommaso Paradiso. The album entered the top ten in Italy and was certified platinum by FIMI.

Franco126's second studio set, Multisala, became his first number-one album in May 2021. The album spawned singles including "Che senso ha" and "Blue Jeans", which features vocals by Calcutta. To promote the album, Franco126 embarked on a tour which included shows at the Mediolanum Forum in Milan and at the PalaLottomatica in Rome.

== Discography ==
=== Studio albums ===
Title	Album details	Peak chart positions	Certifications
Title	Album details	ITA	Certifications
Stanza singola	Released: 25 January 2019; Label: Bomba Dischi, Universal Music Italy; Format: LP, CD, digital download, streaming	7	FIMI: 2× Platinum
Multisala	Released: 22 April 2021; Label: Bomba Dischi, Universal Music Italy; Format: LP, CD, digital download, streaming	1	FIMI: Gold
Futuri possibili	Released: 28 March 2025; Label: Bomba Dischi, Universal Music Italy; Format: LP, CD, digital download, streaming	3	FIMI: Platinum

=== Singles ===
==== As lead artist ====
Title	Year	Peak chart positions	Certifications	Album
Title	Year	ITA	Certifications	Album
"Enzo Salvi"	2016	—		Non-album single
"Frigobar"	2018	—	FIMI: Gold	Stanza singola
"Ieri l'altro"	2018	82	FIMI: Platinum	Stanza singola
"Stanza singola" (featuring Tommaso Paradiso)	2019	8	FIMI: 2× Platinum	Stanza singola
"San Siro"	2019	90	FIMI: Gold	Stanza singola
"Cos'è l'amore" (with Don Joe and Ketama126 featuring Franco Califano)	2019	46	FIMI: Gold	Kety
"Blue Jeans" (featuring Calcutta)	2020	33	FIMI: Platinum	Mulitsala
"Nessun perché"	2021	80		Mulitsala
"Che senso ha"	2021	56	FIMI: Gold	Mulitsala
"Fuoriprogramma"	2021	—		Mulitsala
"Mare malinconia" (with Loredana Bertè)	2021	—		Manifesto
"Nottetempo" (featuring Giorgio Poi)	2025	49		Futuri possibili
"Futuri possibili"	2025	80		Futuri possibili
"Occhi ingenui" (featuring Ele A)	2026	—		Futuri possibili
