= Eco (song) =

Single by Joan Thiele

from the album Joanita
- Language: Italian
- Released: 12 February 2025
- Genre: Indie rock
- Length: 3:14
- Label: Numero Uno; Sony Music
- Songwriters: Alessandra Joan Thiele; Federica Abbate; Emanuele Triglia; Simone Benussi
- Producers: Joan Thiele; Emanuele Triglia; MACE

Joan Thiele singles chronology
"Veleno" (2024)	"Eco" (2025)	"Allucinazione" (2025)

Music video
- "Eco" on YouTube

"Eco" is a song co-written and recorded by Italian singer-songwriter Joan Thiele, released by Numero Uno and Sony Music on 12 February 2025 as the second single from her second studio album, Joanita. It competed during the Sanremo Music Festival 2025, placing 20th.

== Music video ==
A music video of "Eco", directed by Roberto Ortu, was released on 12 February 2025 via Thiele's YouTube channel.

== Charts ==
Chart performance for "Eco"
Chart (2025)	Peak position
Italy (FIMI)	30
Italy Airplay (EarOne)	19
