= Una seria =

Studio album by Baby K
- Released: 12 March 2013
- Recorded: 2012
- Genre: Hip hop; alt-pop
- Length: 43:16
- Language: Italian
- Label: Sony Music
- Producer: Tiziano Ferro, Michele Canova Iorfida

Baby K chronology
Una seria (2013)	Kiss Kiss Bang Bang (2015)

Singles from Una seria
- 1. "Sparami" Released: December 3, 2012; 2. "Killer" Released: January 25, 2013; 3. "Non cambierò mai" Released: April 5, 2013; 4. "Sei sola" Released: September 13, 2013; 5. "Una seria" Released: January 18, 2014

Una seria is the debut studio album by Italian singer and rapper Baby K, released on 12 March 2013 by Sony Music, produced by Tiziano Ferro.

== Background and description ==
Produced by Tiziano Ferro and Michele Canova Iorfida, Una seria was anticipated by the singles "Sparami" and "Killer". "Sparami" is a single released by the rapper before the album release, with a video released on the rapper’s official channel YouTube Vevo, while the song "Killer" featuring Tiziano Ferro, was released in January 2013 as the album’s second single, and had was very successful in Italy. With the album release was released the promotional single "Se ti fa sentire meglio" that is included exclusively for the digital version of the album on iTunes. The third and fourth singles "Non cambierò mai" and "Sei sola" were released repeatedly on April 5 and September 13, 2013. On January 18, 2014 was released on YouTube the music video of the fifth and last single "Una seria" to end the promotion of the album; The album also features the song "Femmina alfa", originally published in the EP Femmina alfa (2011).

== Track listing ==
No.	Title	Length
1.	"Intro"	0:31
2.	"Non cambierò mai" (featuring Marracash)	3:06
3.	"Killer" (featuring Tiziano Ferro)	3:33
4.	"Una seria" (featuring Fabri Fibra)	4:02
5.	"Sparami"	3:25
6.	"Sei sola" (featuring Tiziano Ferro)	3:31
7.	"Domani"	3:48
8.	"Il tuo boy è preso male" (featuring Tiziano Ferro)	3:31
9.	"Come il domino"	2:47
10.	"Una favola"	2:38
11.	"La verità"	3:14
12.	"Tutto ritorna"	3:09
13.	"Femmina alfa"	2:57
14.	"Se ti fa sentire meglio" (iTunes bonus track)	3:04

== Charts ==
Weekly chart performance for Una Seria
Chart (2013)	Peak position
Italian Albums (FIMI)	8
