= Icona (album) =

Studio album by Baby K
- Released: 16 November 2018
- Recorded: 2017–2018
- Genre: Pop; reggaeton
- Length: 32:46
- Language: Italian, Spanish
- Label: Sony Music

Baby K chronology
Kiss Kiss Bang Bang (2015)	Icona (2018)	Donna sulla Luna (2021)

Singles from Icona
- 1. "Voglio ballare con te" Released: June 2, 2017; 2. "Aspettavo solo te" Released: December 15, 2017; 3. "Da zero a cento" Released: June 22, 2018; 4. "Come no" Released: October 26, 2018

Icona is the third studio album by Italian singer and rapper Baby K, released on 16 November 2018 by Sony Music. The album includes the singles "Voglio ballare con te" and "Da zero a cento".

== Description ==
Composed of ten tracks, the album represents a departure from the pop rap sounds of the first two albums in favor of others tending to electropop and reggaeton. The album was preceded by four singles, made available for digital download between 2017 and 2018.

== Track listing ==
No.	Title	Length
1.	"Icona"	3:10
2.	"Come no"	2:49
3.	"Da zero a cento"	3:26
4.	"Certe cose" (featuring J-Ax)	3:36
5.	"Vibe" (featuring Gemitaiz and Vegas Jones)	3:32
6.	"Voglio ballare con te" (featuring Andrés Dvicio)	2:43
7.	"Aspettavo solo te"	3:06
8.	"Dammi un buon motivo"	3:06
9.	"Mi faccio i film"	3:52
10.	"Sogni d'oro e di platino"	3:26

== Charts ==
Weekly chart performance for Icona
Chart (2018)	Peak position
Italian Albums (FIMI)	6
Swiss Albums (Schweizer Hitparade)	77
