= Takagi & Ketra =

Italian musical duo

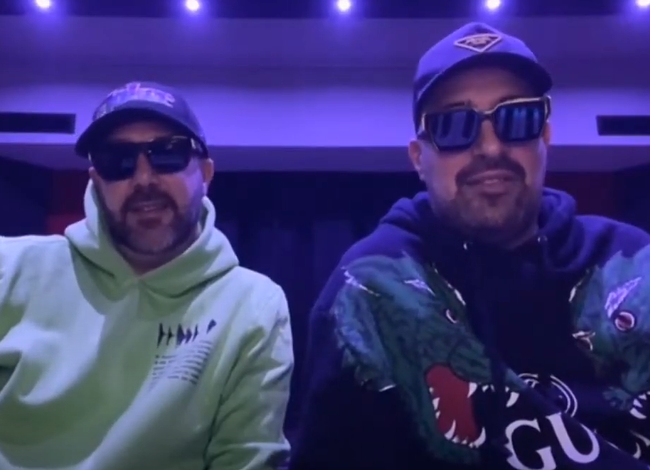
- Takagi & Ketra in 2021

Background information
- Genres: Pop
- Years active: 2014–present
- Members: Alessandro Merli; Fabio Clemente

Takagi & Ketra is an Italian musical duo consisting of producer Alessandro Merli (Takagi) and DJ Fabio Clemente (Ketra).

The duo wrote and produced songs for various Italian artists, including Rocco Hunt, Fedez, Baby K, J-Ax, Boomdabash, Marco Mengoni, Fred De Palma and Marracash. Since 2017, they have released ten singles, topping the FIMI's singles chart three times, with "Amore e capoeira", "Jambo" and "Everyday".

== Discography ==
=== Singles ===
==== As lead artists ====
List of singles, with chart positions and certifications
Title	Year	Peak chart positions		Certifications
Title	Year	ITA	SWI	Certifications
"L'esercito del selfie" (featuring Lorenzo Fragola and Arisa)	2017	4	53	FIMI: 3× Platinum
"Da sola/In the Night" (featuring Tommaso Paradiso and Elisa)	2018	12	—	FIMI: Platinum
"Amore e capoeira" (featuring Giusy Ferreri and Sean Kingston)	2018	1	2	FIMI: 5× Platinum; IFPI Switzerland: Platinum
"La luna e la gatta" (featuring Tommaso Paradiso, Jovanotti and Calcutta)	2019	9	—	FIMI: 2× Platinum
"Jambo" (featuring Omi and Giusy Ferreri)	2019	1	11	FIMI: 4× Platinum; IFPI Switzerland: Platinum
"Ciclone" (featuring Elodie, Mariah and Gipsy Kings)	2020	9	—	FIMI: 2× Platinum
"Venere e Marte" (featuring Marco Mengoni and Frah Quintale)	2021	2	—	FIMI: 2× Platinum
"Shimmy Shimmy" (featuring Giusy Ferreri)	2021	22	—	FIMI: Platinum
"Bubble" (featuring Thasup and Salmo)	2022	10	—	FIMI: 2× Platinum
"Everyday" (featuring Shiva, Anna and Geolier)	2023	1	44	FIMI: 3× Platinum
"—" denotes an item that did not chart in that country.

==== As featured artists ====
List of singles as featured artist, with selected chart positions, showing year released and album name
Title	Year	Peak chart positions		Certifications	Album
Title	Year	ITA	SWI	Certifications	Album
"Oroscopo" (Calcutta featuring Takagi & Ketra)	2016	80	—	FIMI: 3× Platinum	Non-album single
"Panico" (Lazza featuring Takagi & Ketra)	2022	2	—	FIMI: 5× Platinum	Sirio
"Chiagne" (Geolier featuring Lazza and Takagi & Ketra)	2022	2	—	FIMI: 3× Platinum	Il coraggio dei bambini
"—" denotes an item that did not chart in that country.

==== As producers ====
List of songs as producers, with chart positions, certifications and album name
Title	Year	Peak chart positions		Certifications	Album
Title	Year	ITA	SWI	Certifications	Album
"Taxi sulla Luna" (Emma and Tony Effe)	2023	7	—	FIMI: 2× Platinum	Souvenir
"L'ultima poesia" (Geolier and Ultimo)	2024	1	72	FIMI: Platinum	Dio lo sa
"Fino all'alba" (with Capo Plaza)	2024	18	—	FIMI: Platinum	Ferite (Deluxe Edition)
"—" denotes an item that did not chart in that country.
