= Tommaso Paradiso =

Italian singer-songwriter

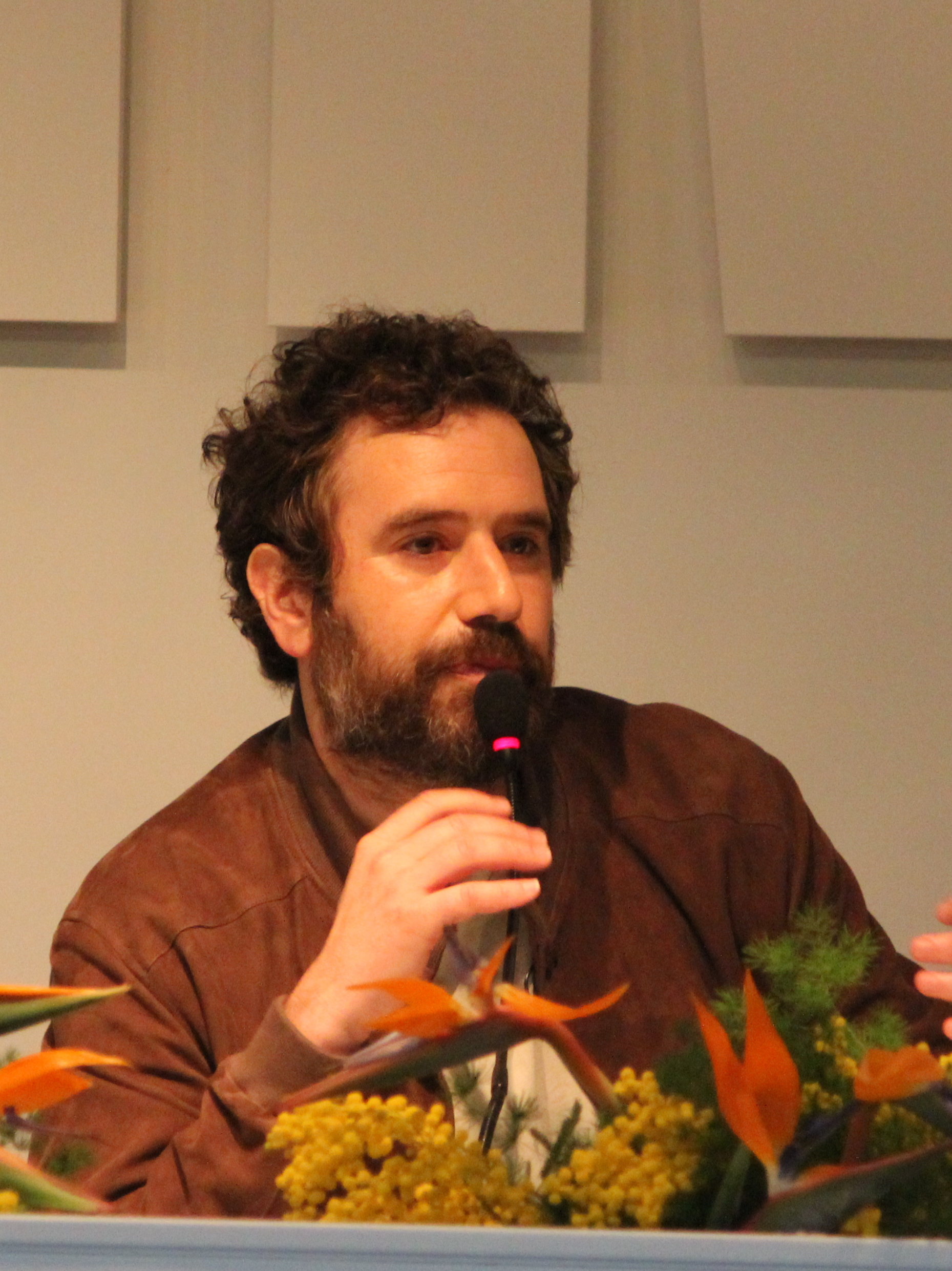
- Paradiso in 2026

Background information
- Born: 25 June 1983 (age 43); Rome, Italy
- Occupations: Singer; songwriter; filmmaker
- Years active: 2009–present
- Label: Island

Tommaso Paradiso (born 25 June 1983) is an Italian singer, songwriter, filmmaker, and former frontman of the indie pop band Thegiornalisti.

== Life and career ==
Born in the Prati district of Rome to a family with Campanian roots, Paradiso graduated in philosophy after attending a classical high school.

In 2009, he co-founded the band Thegiornalisti with Marco Antonio Musella and Marco Primavera, debuting in 2011 with the album Vol. 1. The band gained widespread recognition with subsequent albums, including Fuoricampo (2014), Completamente Sold Out (2016), and Love (2018), as well as the hit single "Riccione" (2017).

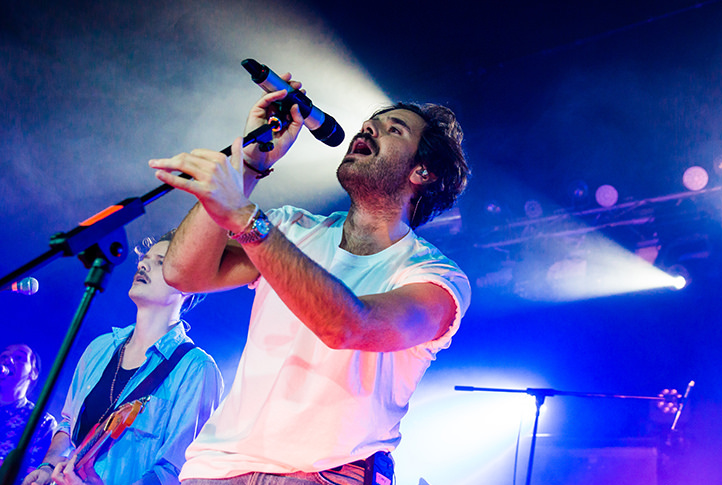
Paradiso in 2016

Paradiso composed the music for Luca Carboni's successful single "Luca lo stesso" in 2015 and contributed to various projects, including the writing of "L'esercito del selfie" by Takagi & Ketra and "Partiti adesso" by Giusy Ferreri. He worked again with Takagi & Ketra on "Da sola/In the Night" in 2018 and "La luna e la gatta" in 2019. He also wrote songs for Nina Zilli, Noemi, Gianni Morandi, Francesca Michielin, Franco126, and Loredana Bertè.

In September 2019, Paradiso announced his departure from Thegiornalisti to pursue a solo career, launching it with the single "Non avere paura". On 4 March 2022, he released his debut album, Space Cowboy. His second studio album, Sensazione stupenda, was released on 6 October 2023.

In 2022, Paradiso made his directorial debut with the film Sulle nuvole.

On 30 November 2025, he was announced among the participants of the Sanremo Music Festival 2026. He competed with the song "I romantici".

== Discography ==
=== Studio albums ===
Title	Album details	Peak chart positions
Title	Album details	ITA
Space Cowboy	Release date: 4 March 2022; Label: Island	5
Sensazione stupenda	Release date: 6 October 2023; Label: Island	7
Casa Paradiso	Release date: 28 November 2025; Label: Columbia	4

=== Charting singles ===
Title	Year	Peak chart positions	Album
Title	Year	ITA	Album
"Lasciamene un po'"	2025	54	Casa Paradiso
"Forse"	2025	95	Casa Paradiso
"Agitare coca cola"	2025	50	Casa Paradiso
"I romantici"	2026	8	Casa Paradiso

== Filmography ==
Film
Year	Title	Role	Notes
2020	Under the Riccione Sun	Himself	Cameo role
2022	Sulle nuvole	None	As director and writer
