= Andrés Ceballos Sánchez =

Andrés Ceballos
- Born: Andrés Ceballos Sánchez; August 31, 1992 (age 34); Madrid, Spain
- Genre: Latin Pop
- Occupations: Singer, songwriter
- Instrument: Vocals
- Years active: 2009–present
- Label: Sony Music Spain
- Website: dvicio.com

Andrés Ceballos Sánchez (born August 31, 1992), known by his stage name Andrés Ceballos, is a Spanish singer and songwriter from Rivas Vaciamadrid, Spain. He was a member of the group Dvicio, which was created in 2009 under the name Tiempo Límite. His brother Martin Ceballos is also a member of Dvicio.

== Early life ==
Ceballos was born in Madrid, Spain on August 31, 1992. He has an older brother named Martin Ceballos. He went to school for music. He bought his first guitar at age 13 and by age 17 he had formed his own group. He later became a member of the band Tiempo Límite, now under the name DVICIO with his friends from school and his brother. In 2013 he performed solo alongside Carlos Baute throughout Latin America and experienced what it would be like to perform. Andrés said he would never forget that moment and this is why he became brave enough to do what he does with his group and get noticed as DVICIO

== Career ==
=== 2009–12: Beginnings and forming Tiempo Limite ===
Growing up in Madrid, he started his career playing with the group currently known as Dvicio, under the name Tiempo Limite. They released the songs "Dueña de Mi Mente" and "Detras de Mis Miedos." Around 2011 they went on a radio show and won a contest for making a cover song of "Titanium"

=== 2013–present: Dvicio and featured artist ===
In 2013 the group changed their name to Dvicio and signed with Sony Music Spain, which released their single "Paraiso" in 2014.

In 2015, Andres was featured in Spanish artist Maria Parrado song called Frio and a music video was also released. In June 2015, Andres sang with vocal artist Abraham Mateo as a duo for one of his hit songs, "Another Heartbreak" where it came out exclusively in Abraham's DVD album. Then on YouTube.

In 2016, Andres was featured in Portuguese group D.A.M.A song called "A veces" and a music video was also released. By the end of 2016 Andres had it rough for him when he was introducing the award to the late singer Juan Gabriel who had died days ago. He was bashed for waiting for someone to pick up the award, which Andres thought one of his people would pick up, he made himself look bad in front of the audience in the Gaffe at The Latin Grammys. He apologized moments later in their recaps of the events, in which he stated "I thought someone from his record producers or a family was going to come down and get the award." and apologized for his misunderstanding with the late singer on live television at the event and social media from the backlash.

In April 2017, Dvicio released the album Qué Tienes Tú and embarked on a tour around Mexico. On June 2, Andrés's was featured in Italian singer Baby K song which was released, titled "Voglio ballare con te". The song "Voglio ballare con te" has surpassed Gold and has now reached platinum status. On September 8, 2017, Baby K made the song in Spanish with Andres. The song title is Locos Valientes.

On October 26th, 2022, Dvicio announced on Instagram that they would be disbanding because Andrés wanted to start his solo career.

In 2026, he was announced as a participant of Benidorm Fest 2027.

== Personal life ==
Andrés is of Argentinian descent from his father and Brazilian from his mother. His parents, at the same time, are of Spanish descent as can be seen from his surnames. Aside from Spanish, he is also fluent in English and Portuguese. He can sing in Spanish, Italian and Portuguese. Currently, he is learning Russian, Thai and German. He frequently does covers of English songs and puts them up on his social media to help practice his English. He is also often seen playing the guitar and piano.

== Discography ==
=== As featured artist ===
List of singles as featured artist
| Title | Year | Peaks | | Certifications | Album |
| Title | Year | ITA | SWI | Certifications | Album |
|---|---|---|---|---|---|
| "Frio" (Maria Parrado featuring Andrés Dvicio) | 2015 | — | — | — | Abril |
| "A veces" (D.A.M.A featuring Andrés Ceballos) | 2016 | — | — | — | Non-album single |
| "Voglio ballare con te" (Baby K featuring Andrés Dvicio) | 2017 | 2 | 20 | FIMI: 5× Platinum; IFPI SWI: Gold | Icona |
| "Locos valientes" (Baby K featuring Andrés Dvicio) | 2017 | — | — | — | Non-album single |
"—" denotes a recording that did not chart or was not released in that territory.

== Filmography ==
=== Music videos ===
| Title | Year | Director |
|---|---|---|
| "Frio" (Maria Parrado featuring Andrés Ceballos) | 2015 | —N/a |
| "A veces" (D.A.M.A featuring Andrés Ceballos) | 2016 | D.A.M.A |
| "Voglio ballare con te" (Baby K featuring Andrés Ceballos) | 2017 | Mauro Russo |
