= Roma-Bangkok =

Single by Baby K featuring Giusy Ferreri

from the album Kiss Kiss Bang Bang
- Released: 19 June 2015
- Recorded: April – May 2015; Takagi Beatz Studio, Milan, Italy (recording); Fonjika Studio, Biella, Italy (mastering and mixing)
- Genre: Electropop; moombahton
- Length: 2:53
- Label: Sony Music
- Songwriters: Federica Abbate; Rocco Hunt; Alessandro "Takagi" Merli; Fabio "Mr. Ketra" Clemente
- Producers: Takagi; Mr. Ketra

Baby K singles chronology
"Anna Wintour" (2015)	"Roma-Bangkok" (2015)	"Chiudo gli occhi e salto" (2015)

Giusy Ferreri singles chronology
"Inciso sulla pelle" (2014)	"Roma-Bangkok" (2015)	"Volevo te" (2015)

Lali singles chronology
"Ego" (2016)	"Roma-Bangkok" (2017)	"Una Na" (2017)

Alternative cover
- Spanish version with Lali

Music video
- "Roma-Bangkok" on YouTube

"Roma-Bangkok" (Italian pronunciation: [ˌromabaŋˈkɔk]; "From Rome to Bangkok") is a song recorded by Italian rapper Baby K, with vocals by Italian singer Giusy Ferreri, for her second studio album Kiss Kiss Bang Bang (2015). The song was released on 19 June 2015 as the second single from the album.

"Roma-Bangkok" was a massive commercial success in Italy in 2015. The song reached number one in a month on both the Italian FIMI chart and the EarOne airplay chart, becoming Baby K's first number-one single. It remained on the top of the chart for eleven consecutive weeks and later was certified diamond in Italy.

== Background ==
The song was written by Federica Abbate, Rocco Hunt, Alessandro "Takagi" Merli and Fabio "Mr. Ketra" Clemente, the latter two also produced it. In an interview, Baby K presented the song with these words: "The lyrics of this song present the geographical map of my life: London, Rome and the Far East. Actually, they are the places where I lived, which I still carry within myself and I can live again through my music".

== Music video ==
The music video, directed by Mauro Russo, was published on 7 July 2015 on the rapper's official YouTube channel. It was acclaimed by critics, who noted its similarities to 1991 American film Thelma & Louise. However, MTV compared it to "Pretty Girls" music video by Britney Spears and Iggy Azalea. It was the first Italian music video to be Vevo certified; in February 2017, it became the all-time most-watched Italian video on YouTube, with over 163 million views. Currently, the video has more than 280 million views.

== Spanish version ==
On 17 February 2017 a second Spanish version was released featuring Argentine pop singer Lali. The song was adapted to Spanish by José Luis Pagan and was produced by Ketra & Takagi. Its music video was shot in September 2016 in Verona, Italy, and was directed by Gaetano Morbioli. Chiara Tomao from Optimagazine praised both artist's voices, writing "Lali's voice fits perfectly with our Claudia Nahum (Baby K)".

== Charts ==
=== Weekly charts ===
Original version
Chart (2015–16)	Peak position
Belgium (Ultratip Bubbling Under Wallonia)	17
Finland (Suomen virallinen lista)	6
France (SNEP)	25
Italy (FIMI)	1
Russia (TopHit)	133
Switzerland (Schweizer Hitparade)	23

=== Year-end charts ===
Original version
Chart (2015)	Position
Italy (FIMI)	1
Chart (2016)	Position
Italy (FIMI)	41

Spanish version featuring Lali
Chart (2017)	Position
Uruguay (Monitor Latino)	100

== Certifications ==
Region	Certification	Certified units/sales
Italy (FIMI)	Diamond	500,000^{‡}
^{‡} Sales+streaming figures based on certification alone.

== Release history ==
Region	Date	Version	Format	Label	Ref.
Worldwide	16 June 2015	Original version	Digital download	Sony Music	
Italy	19 June 2015	Original version	Contemporary hit radio	Sony Music	
Various	19 February 2016	Spanish version with Giusy Ferreri	Digital download	Sony Music	
Worldwide	17 February 2017	Spanish version with Lali	Digital download	Sony Music	
