= Boomdabash =

Italian musical group

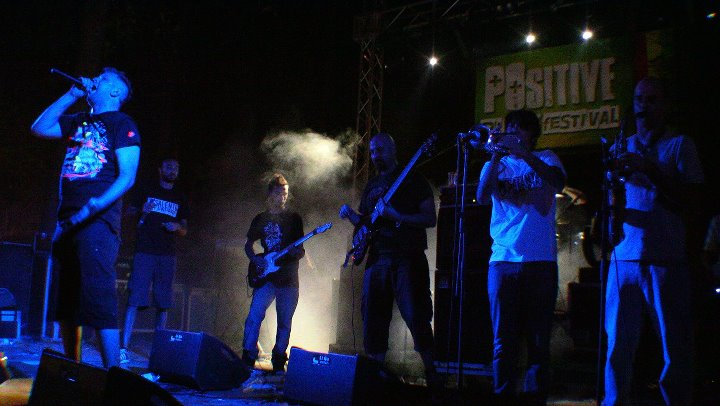
- Boomdabash & The Cool Steppers band - Live at Positive River festival (2011)

Background information
- Origin: Mesagne, Apulia, Italy
- Genres: Dancehall reggae Raggamuffin
- Years active: 2002–present
- Members: Biggie Bash; Payà; Blazon; Mr. Ketra

Boomdabash (often stylized as BoomDaBash) is an Italian dancehall reggae band formed in 2002.

They debuted in 2008 with the album Uno.

The band participated at the Sanremo Music Festival 2019 with the song "Per un milione".

== Discography ==
=== Studio albums ===
- Uno (2008)
- Mad(e) in Italy (2011)
- Superheroes (2013)
- Radio Revolution (2015)
- Barracuda (2018)
- Venduti (2023)
