= Emma Marrone discography =

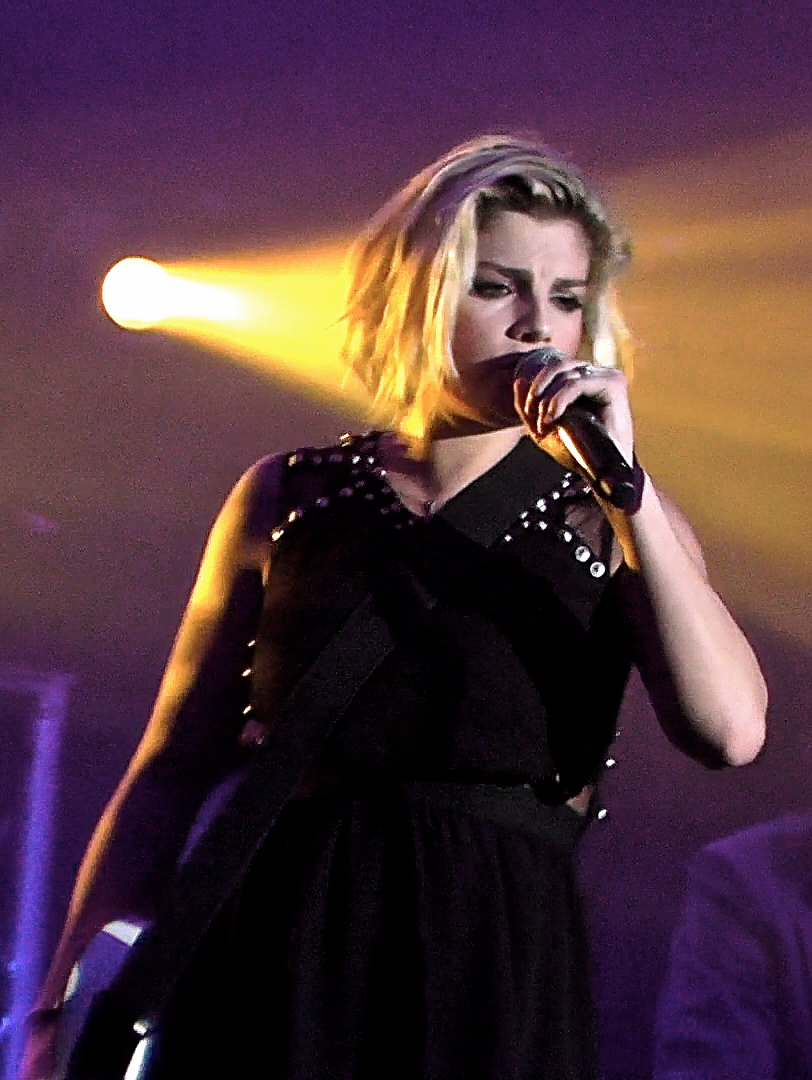
- Marrone in concert in Bologna in 2012 to PalaDozza with the Sarò libera Tour
- Studio albums: 7
- EPs: 1
- Live albums: 1
- Compilation albums: 1
- Singles: 50
- Music videos: 50

Italian singer Emma Marrone has released seven studio albums, one compilation album, one live album, one extended play, fifty singles (including six as a featured artist) and fifty music videos.

== Albums ==
=== Studio albums ===
List of studio albums, with selected chart positions and certifications
Title	Album details	Peak chart positions		Certifications
Title	Album details	ITA	SWI	Certifications
A me piace così	Released: 19 October 2010; Label: Universal Music; Formats: CD, digital download	2	50	FIMI: 2× Platinum
Sarò libera	Released: 20 September 2011; Label: Universal Music; Formats: CD, digital download	1	43	FIMI: 3× Platinum
Schiena	Released: 9 April 2013; Label: Universal Music; Formats: CD, vinyl, digital download	1	25	FIMI: 3× Platinum
Adesso	Released: 27 November 2015; Label: Universal Music; Formats: CD, vinyl, digital download	2	23	FIMI: 2× Platinum
Essere qui	Released: 26 January 2018; Label: Universal Music; Formats: CD, vinyl, digital download	2	15	FIMI: Platinum
Fortuna	Released: 25 October 2019; Label: Universal Music; Formats: CD, vinyl, digital download	1	35	FIMI: Gold
Souvenir	Released: 13 October 2023; Label: Universal Music; Formats: CD, vinyl, digital download	1	56	FIMI: Platinum

=== Compilation albums ===
List of compilation albums, with selected chart positions
Title	Album details	Peak chart positions		Certifications
Title	Album details	ITA	SWI	Certifications
Best of Me	Released: 24 June 2021; Label: Universal Music; Formats: CD, vinyl, digital download	4	96	FIMI: Gold

=== Live albums ===
Title	Album details	Peak chart positions	Certifications
Title	Album details	ITA	Certifications
E live	Released: 11 November 2014; Label: Universal Music; Formats: CD, DVD, digital download	6	FIMI: Gold

== Extended plays ==
List of EPs, with selected chart positions and certifications
Title	Album details	Peak chart positions		Certifications
Title	Album details	ITA	SWI	Certifications
Oltre	Released: 16 March 2010; Label: Universal Music; Formats: CD, digital download	1	85	FIMI: 3× Platinum

== Singles ==
=== As lead artist ===
Title	Year	Peak positions			Certifications	Album
Title	Year	ITA	AUT	SWI	Certifications	Album
"Calore"	2010	1	—	64	FIMI: Platinum	Oltre
"Un sogno a costo zero"	2010	—	—	—		Oltre
"Sembra strano"	2010	—	—	—		Oltre
"Con le nuvole"	2010	16	—	—		A me piace così
"Cullami"	2010	23	—	—		A me piace così
"Arriverà" (with the Modà)	2011	1	—	—	FIMI: 2× Platinum	A me piace così
"Io son per te l'amore"	2011	28	—	—		A me piace così
"Sarò libera"	2011	4	—	—	FIMI: Gold	Sarò libera
"Tra passione e lacrime"	2011	42	—	—		Sarò libera
"Non è l'inferno"	2012	1	—	19	FIMI: 2× Platinum	Sarò libera
"Cercavo amore"	2012	1	—	68	FIMI: Platinum	Sarò libera
"Maledetto quel giorno"	2012	34	—	—		Sarò libera
"Amami"	2013	3	—	—	FIMI: Platinum	Schiena
"Dimentico tutto"	2013	12	—	—	FIMI: Platinum	Schiena
"L'amore non mi basta"	2013	1	—	—	FIMI: 2× Platinum	Schiena
"Trattengo il fiato"	2014	36	—	—	FIMI: Gold	Schiena
"La mia città"	2014	24	71	—	FIMI: Gold	Schiena vs. Schiena
"Resta ancora un po'"	2014	16	—	—	FIMI: Gold	E Live
"Occhi profondi"	2015	13	—	—	FIMI: 2× Platinum	Adesso
"Arriverà l'amore"	2015	5	—	—	FIMI: Platinum	Adesso
"Io di te non ho paura"	2016	65	—	—	FIMI: Gold	Adesso
"Il paradiso non esiste"	2016	—	—	—	FIMI: Gold	Adesso
"Quando le canzoni finiranno"	2016	—	—	—		Adesso
"L'isola"	2018	7	—	—		Essere qui
"Effetto domino"	2018	—	—	—		Essere qui
"Mi parli piano"	2018	46	—	—	FIMI: Gold	Essere qui
"Mondiale"	2018	7	—	—		Essere qui (Boom Edition)
"Io sono bella"	2019	33	—	—		Fortuna
"Stupida allegria" (solo or featuring Izi)	2019	42	—	—	FIMI: Gold	Fortuna
"Luci blu"	2020	—	—	—		Fortuna
"Latina"	2020	53	—	—		Fortuna
"Pezzo di cuore" (with Alessandra Amoroso)	2021	2	—	—	FIMI: Platinum	Best of Me
"Che sogno incredibile" (with Loredana Bertè)	2021	71	—	—	FIMI: Gold	Best of Me
"Ogni volta è così"	2022	13	—	96	FIMI: Platinum	Non-album single
"Mezzo mondo"	2023	38	—	—	FIMI: Platinum	Souvenir
"Taxi sulla Luna" (with Tony Effe and Takagi & Ketra)	2023	7	—	—	FIMI: 4× Platinum	Souvenir and Icon
"Iniziamo dalla fine"	2023	42	—	—	FIMI: Gold	Souvenir
"Amore cane" (with Lazza)	2023	23	—	—	FIMI: Gold	Souvenir
"Apnea"	2024	9	—	81	FIMI: 2× Platinum	Souvenir
"Femme fatale"	2024	53	—	—	FIMI: Gold	Souvenir
"Ho voglia di te" (with Juli and Olly)	2024	20	—	—	FIMI: Platinum	Non-album single
"Hangover" (featuring Baby Gang)	2024	68	—	—		Souvenir: Extended
"Brutta storia" (with Juli)	2025	60	—	—		TBA
"Vacci piano" (with Rkomi)	2026	42	—	—		TBA
"Antidroga" (with Fabri Fibra)	2026	95	—	—		TBA
"—" denotes a recording that did not chart or was not released in that territory.

=== As featured artist ===
Song	Year	Peak positions	Certifications	Album
Song	Year	ITA	Certifications	Album
"Come in un film" (Modà featuring Emma)	2014	95		2004-2014 – L'originale
"Ora o mai più" (Don Joe featuring Emma)	2015	68		Ora o mai più
"Libre" (Álvaro Soler featuring Emma)	2016	26	FIMI: Platinum	Eterno agosto
"Love Is Madness" (Thirty Seconds to Mars featuring Emma)	2019	—		Non-album single
"C'hai ragione tu" (Gianni Bismark featuring Emma)	2020	—		Nati diversi – Ultima cena
"In Italia 2024" (Fabri Fibra featuring Emma and Baby Gang)	2024	16	FIMI: Platinum	Non-album single
"—" denotes a recording that did not chart or was not released in that territory.

== Other charted songs ==
Title	Year	Peak positions	Certifications	Album
Title	Year	ITA	Certifications	Album
"Meravigliosa"	2010	40		Oltre
"Bella senz'anima"	2012	19		Non-album song
"Schiena"	2013	48		Schiena
"Adesso (ti voglio bene)"	2015	66		Adesso
"Incredibile voglia di niente"	2018	95		Essere qui

== Guest appearances ==
Title	Year	Other artist(s)	Album
"Nel blu, dipinto di blu"	2012	None	Benvenuti al Nord (Soundtrack)
"Hombre de tu vida"	2012	David Bisbal	Tú y yo
"La signora del quinto piano #1522"	2015	Carmen Consoli, Gianna Nannini, Irene Grandi, Elisa and Nada	Non-album song
"Giù con me (schiena)"	2015	Briga	Never Again (Platinvm Edition)
"Prigioniera a distanza"	2016	Ron	La forza di dire sì
"Sorrido già"	2016	Elisa, Giuliano Sangiorgi	On
"Non sono una signora"	2016	Loredana Bertè	Amici non ne ho… ma amiche sì!
"Odiare"	2017	Syria	10 + 10
"Jem"	2017	Cristina D'Avena	Duets
"Cercavo amore"	2019	Roberto Casalino	Il fabbricante di ricordi
"Mi parli piano"	2019	Roberto Casalino	Il fabbricante di ricordi
"Autunno"	2020	Roberto Vecchioni	Note di viaggio - Capitolo 2: Non vi succederà niente
"Fino alla fine"	2023	Paola & Chiara	Per sempre
"Graffiti"	2023	Boomdabash	Venduti
"I Know What You Want"	2026	Lacrim	Cipriani

== Videography ==
Title	Year	Other artist(s)	Director(s)
"Calore"	2010	None	Gaetano Morbioli
"Un sogno a costo zero"	2010	None	Roberto Cinardi
"Sembra strano"	2010	None	Roberto Cinardi
"Con le nuvole"	2010	None	Roberto Cinardi
"Cullami"	2010	None	Gaetano Morbioli
"Arriverà"	2011	Modà	Gaetano Morbioli
"Io son per te l'amore"	2011	None	Marco Salom
"Sarò libera"	2011	None	Alberto Puliafito
"Tra passione e lacrime"	2011	None	Marco Salom
"Non è l'inferno"	2012	None	Marco Salom
"Cercavo amore"	2012	None	Marco Salom
"Cercavo amore" (Remixed Video)	2012	None	Marco Salom
"Maledetto quel giorno"	2012	None	Marco Salom
"Amami"	2013	None	Ludovico Galletti, Sami Schinaia
"Dimentico tutto"	2013	None	Luca Tartaglia
"L'amore non mi basta"	2013	None	Luca Tartaglia
"L'amore non mi basta" (Semi-Acoustic)	2013	None	Luca Tartaglia
"Trattengo il fiato"	2014	None	Marco Salom
"La mia città"	2014	None	Leandro Manuel Emede, Nicolò Cerioni
"Resta ancora un po'"	2014	None	Leandro Manuel Emede, Nicolò Cerioni
"Come in un film"	2014	Modà	Gaetano Morbioli
"Ora o mai più"	2015	Don Joe	Fabrizio Conte
"Occhi profondi"	2015	None	Luigi Antonini, Giuliano Peparini
"Arriverà l'amore"	2015	None	Luisa Carcavale, Alessandro Guida
"Io di te non ho paura"	2016	None	Luisa Carcavale
"Il paradiso non esiste"	2016	None	Luisa Carcavale
"Libre"	2016	Álvaro Soler	Gaetano Morbioli
"Quando le canzoni finiranno"	2016	None	Marco Ponti
"L'isola"	2018	None	Lukasz Pruchnik
"Effetto domino"	2018	None	Paolo Stella
"Mi parli piano"	2018	None	Paolo Stella
"Mondiale"	2018	None	YouNuts!
"Io sono bella"	2019	None	Paolo Mannarino
"Stupida allegria"	2019	None	Attilio Cusani
"Luci blu"	2020	None	Paolo Mannarino
"Latina"	2020	None	Bendo
"C'hai ragione tu"	2020	Gianni Bismark	Bendo
"Pezzo di cuore"	2021	Alessandra Amoroso	Bendo
"Che sogno incredibile"	2021	Loredana Bertè	Bendo
"Ogni volta è così"	2022	None	Bendo
"Mezzo mondo"	2023	None	Asia Lanni, Nicola Brussei
"Taxi sulla Luna"	2023	Tony Effe	Late Milk
"Iniziamo dalla fine"	2023	None	Pierfrancesco Carta
"Apnea"	2024	None	Bogdan Plakov
"In Italia 2024"	2024	Fabri Fibra, Baby Gang	Cosimo Alemà
"Femme fatale"	2024	None	Giulio Rosati
"Ho voglia di te"	2024	Juli, Olly	Amedeo Zancanella
"Hangover"	2024	Baby Gang	Piersilvio Bisogno
"Brutta storia"	2025	Juli	Bogdan Plakov
"Vacci piano"	2026	Rkomi	Nicolò Bassetto
