= Oltre =

Oltre (Italian: "beyond") may refer to:

- it:Oltre (Croazia), former Italian name of Preko, island and commune on the coast of Croatia
- Oltre (es:Fiat Oltre), an Italian concept car by Fiat unveiled at the 2005 Bologna Motor Show, related to the Iveco LMV
- Oltre, Italian language album by Claudio Baglioni
- Oltre, Italian-language EP by Emma Marrone
