= Apnea (Emma Marrone song) =

Single by Emma

from the album Souvenir: Extended
- Released: 7 February 2024
- Genre: Electropop • dance
- Length: 3:00
- Label: Universal
- Songwriters: Emma Marrone; Davide Petrella; Paolo Antonacci; Julien Boverod
- Producer: Juli

Emma singles chronology
"Amore cane" (2023)	"Apnea" (2024)	"In Italia 2024" (2024)

Music video
- "Apnea" on YouTube

"Apnea" is a song co-written and recorded by Italian singer Emma. It was released on 7 February 2024 through Universal Music Italy, as the first single from the deluxe edition of her seventh studio album Souvenir.

The song competed during the 74th Sanremo Music Festival, Italy's musical festival which doubles also as a selection of the act for Eurovision Song Contest, where it placed 14th in the grand final. The song peaked at number nine on the FIMI Single Chart, becoming Marrone's 12th top-ten on the chart.

== Composition ==
The song was written by the singer herself with Paolo Antonacci, Davide Petrella, and Julien Boverod. Emma said that the song was conceived as "the end result of Souvenir" and an introduction to a new artistic direction. In an interview with Radio Italia, she explained the meaning of the song:

"It's a song about those butterflies in your stomach that make you lose your breath a little bit. It's about falling in love. Basically the solution is only one in life: dance your way through. To me, personally, Apnea has always given me this feeling of healthy lightness. [...] "Apea" is the summary of Souvenir, an album that opened me up to new vocal colors. Then, the months of club touring made me more familiar with these experiments."

"Apnea" also marked the singer's fourth participation in the Sanremo Music Festival after her winningsong "Non è l'inferno" (2012), "Arriverà" with Modà (2011) and "Ogni volta è così" (2022).

== Critics reception ==
Andrea Laffranchi of Corriere della Sera described the track as "electro-pop confessions from inside a relationship" with a "playful rhythm." Il Messaggero stated that with the song the singer is “more in focus” than with "Ogni volta è così" from 2022, finding in the refrain a reference to Claudia Mori's "Non succederà più" and to 1980s music sounds.

Silvia Danielli of Billboard Italia also wrote that the singer "chooses a new path" compared to ballads or rock, with a "decidedly uptempo song with an unusual and particularly catchy bridge", calling Emma "an artist who really amazes". Andrea Conti of Il Fatto Quotidiano also claimed that the artist in the song appears "wild and gritty" thanks to "a relentless beat in the refrain", on which she sings about "a love relationship poised between past and present".

== Music video ==
The music video for the song, directed by Bogdan "Chilldays" Plakov, was released on February 7, 2024, through the singer's YouTube channel. On February 8, 2024, a second official music video was published in collaboration with the Italy National Artistic Swimming Team.

== Charts ==
=== Weekly charts ===
Weekly chart performance for "Apnea"
Chart (2024)	Peak position
Italy (FIMI)	9
Italy Airplay (EarOne)	6
Switzerland (Schweizer Hitparade)	81

=== Year-end charts ===
2024 year-end chart performance for "Apnea"
Chart (2024)	Position
Italy (FIMI)	23

== Certifications ==
Certifications for "Apnea"
Region	Certification	Certified units/sales
Italy (FIMI)	2× Platinum	200,000^{‡}
^{‡} Sales+streaming figures based on certification alone.
