= Apnea (disambiguation) =

Apnea is the temporary cessation of breathing.

Apnea may also refer to:

- "Apnea" (Ricardo Arjona song), 2014
- "Apnea" (Emma Marrone song), 2024
