= Dimentico tutto =

Single by Emma

from the album Schiena
- Released: 21 June 2013
- Genre: Pop rap
- Length: 3:30
- Label: Universal
- Songwriters: Francesco Tarducci; Niccolò Bolchi
- Producer: Brando

Emma singles chronology
"Amami" (2013)	"Dimentico tutto" (2013)	"L'amore non mi basta" (2013)

Music video
- "Dimentico tutto" on YouTube

"Dimentico tutto" (transl. I forget everything) is a song recorded by Italian singer Emma. It was released on 21 June 2013 through Universal Music Italy as the second single from her third studio album Schiena.

== Description ==
Written and composed by Nesli and Niccolò Bolchi, produced by Brando and punctuated by the drums of Mylious Johnson, Dimentico tutto features some rap verses, written by Nesli. In this regard, the singer revealed the proposal from her producers to transform them into a genre more suited to her style, making them more musical, but she subsequently wanted to leave them in the rap style. The song also features blues influences.

== Music video ==
The music video, directed by Luca Tartaglia and released on the singer's Vevo channel on 22 June 2013, features Emma as an aviator who, through holograms, delves into her memories. However, her memories, which gradually fade, are erased in the final scene, which features the singer diving into the water. Throughout the video, in addition to her aviator attire, Emma also wears sportswear and a black tutu.

Regarding the video, Brando commented:

Here she's very free, showing off all her different sides, from the more military to the feminine, before moving on to her newfound rap soul. The music video, inspired by the 1990s vibe, is reminiscent of Gwen Stefani and that whole aesthetic revival of pin-ups with a rockabilly look. The idea is that here she's a little more polished and also a little fresher in her image.

== Commercial success ==
Having been in the Top Singles chart for three weeks, "Dimentico tutto" reached #14 in its third week, having previously peaked at #27. The following week, it rose to #12, its highest position. On 26 August the single was certified gold for over 15,000 digital copies sold. During its 44th week of 2013, the single was certified platinum for over 30,000 digital copies sold, confirming its status under the new thresholds applied starting in January 2015, with over 50,000 copies sold.

== Charts ==
=== Weekly charts ===
Weekly chart performance for "Dimentico tutto"
Chart (2013)	Peak position
Italy (FIMI)	12
Italy Airplay (EarOne)	21

=== Year-end charts ===
2013 year-end chart performance for "Dimentico tutto"
Chart (2013)	Position
Italy (FIMI)	45

== Certifications ==
Certifications for "Dimentico tutto"
Region	Certification	Certified units/sales
Italy (FIMI)	Platinum	50,000^{‡}
^{‡} Sales+streaming figures based on certification alone.
