= L'amore non mi basta =

Single by Emma

from the album Schiena
- Released: 11 October 2013
- Genre: Pop rock
- Length: 3:31
- Label: Universal
- Songwriter: Daniele Magro
- Producers: Brando; Fabrizio Ferraguzzo

Emma singles chronology
"Dimentico tutto" (2013)	"L'amore non mi basta" (2013)	"Trattengo il fiato" (2014)

Music video
- "L'amore non mi basta" on YouTube

"L'amore non mi basta" (transl. Love is not enough for me) is a song recorded by Italian singer Emma. It was released on 11 October 2013 through Universal as the third single from her third studio album Schiena.

== Description ==
Written and composed by Daniele Magro and produced by Brando and Fabrizio Ferraguzzo, "L'amore non mi basta" was made available for free download on 26 March 2013, to anyone who pre-ordered Schiena through the iTunes Store. Emma stated that with this single she wanted to pay homage to Pink's "Try": it's no coincidence that the drum parts in the song were handled by Mylious Johnson, Pink's drummer.

The song's lyrics are introspective and dedicated to feelings, and in particular to the troubled end of a love affair, a story in which the great passion between the two protagonists is not enough to cover the shortcomings of a love that is inexorably fading.

The song showcases the most gritty side of the Salento singer, the track is often defined as energetic, leaning into rock elements, resulting in one of the most musically mean songs of her career. Within the song, the singer is able to showcase her artistic personality.

Regarding the collaboration between the Salento artist and the young singer-songwriter Daniele Magro, producer Brando declared:

Daniele was already on good terms with Emma and Francesca Savini, one of my collaborators. I was working at Universal, and I'd heard some of Daniele's work. I thought I'd give him a good look, perhaps because I don't belong to any corporation. In my career, I've sidelined more established songwriters. So we had a very professional briefing, with Emma present, and that song came out.

== Music video ==
The music video was released on 21 October 2013 through the singer-songwriter's YouTube channel and was shot in Milan and directed by Luca Tartaglia, who also directed the video for her previous single, Emma stated that the video's script was her own idea, as were the choice of locations and outfits.

The video features Emma alone in a room, her expression pained by the end of a strong love story. There are also clips of her naked in a shower, her makeup faded. The second half of the video shows the Salento-born singer walking through dark corridors wearing sunglasses, as if backstage before a concert, and then performing with some members of her band in front of spectators. The video is interspersed with scenes of her walking alone in the middle of the street. The video features Fabrizio Ferraguzzo (who worked on the album Schiena), her current bassist Matteo Bassi, and her drummer Mylious Johnson, as well as the singer's electric guitar, the same one featured on the official poster for the Schiena tour.

== Commercial success ==
The song debuted at number eleven on the Top Singles chart at the end of March 2013, even before its actual release. Around its release, "L'amore non mi basta" remained on the chart for four weeks, peaking at number fifteen in its final week.

In December 2013, "L'amore non mi basta" was certified gold by FIMI for over 15,000 digital copies sold. In the 44th week of 2014, the single was also certified platinum for exceeding 30,000 copies sold, confirming this achievement under the new thresholds applied since January 2015 with over 50,000 copies sold.

In December 2025, twelve years after its release, the song reappeared in the FIMI chart thanks to the edits on Paulo Dybala at position 72 in the 49th week of the year, reaching the first position of Spotify's Top50 Italy chart on 15 December. On 19 December, in the 51st week of 2025, the song occupies the second position in the FIMI sales chart. In the first week of 2026, the song occupies the first position in the chart, becoming the artist's fifth song to achieve this result.

== Charts ==
=== Weekly charts ===
2013 weekly chart performance for "L'amore non mi basta"
Chart (2013)	Peak position
Italy (FIMI)	11
Italy Airplay (EarOne)	13

2026 weekly chart performance for "L'amore non mi basta"
Chart (2026)	Peak position
Italy (FIMI)	1

=== Year-end charts ===
2013 year-end chart performance for "L'amore non mi basta"
Chart (2013)	Position
Italy (FIMI)	96

== Certifications ==
Certifications for "L'amore non mi basta"
Region	Certification	Certified units/sales
Italy (FIMI)	2× Platinum	400,000^{‡}
^{‡} Sales+streaming figures based on certification alone.
