= Schiena =

Studio album by Emma
- Released: 9 April 2013
- Recorded: 2012 – 2013
- Genre: Pop; rock
- Length: 40:49
- Label: Universal
- Producer: Brando

Emma chronology
Sarò libera (2011)	Schiena (2013)	Adesso (2015)

Schiena vs Schiena Edition Cover

Singles from Schiena
- 1. "Amami" Released: 22 March 2013; 2. "Dimentico tutto" Released: 21 June 2013; 3. "L'amore non mi basta" Released: 11 October 2013; 4. "Trattengo il fiato" Released: 24 January 2014; 5. "La mia città" Released: 9 May 2014

Schiena is the third studio album by Italian singer Emma, released by Universal Music Italy on 9 April 2013. On 12 November 2013 the project was reissued in a double album, titled Schiena vs Schiena.

The album peaked at number one on the Italian Albums Chart, becoming Emma second consecutive project to achieve it, selling over 150,000 copies certified by FIMI. The album featured "La mia città", which competed for Italy at the 59th Eurovision Song Contest, placing 21st.

== Critics reception ==
The album received mixed review by Italian music critics.

== Track listing ==
Schiena – Standard track listing
No.	Title	Writer(s)	Length
1.	"Amami"	Emma Marrone	3:48
2.	"La mia felicità"	Fabrizio Moro	3:23
3.	"Dimentico tutto"	Fabrizio Tarducci; Niccolò Bolchi	3:28
4.	"Ma che vita fai"	Federica Camba; Daniele Coro	3:27
5.	"Trattengo il fiato"	Daniele Magro	3:56
6.	"1, 2, 3"	Magro	3:04
7.	"In ogni angolo di me"	Marrone; Alessandro Raina; Dario Faini	3:41
8.	"L'amore non mi basta"	Magro	3:29
9.	"Se rinasci"	Niccolò Agliardi; Faini	3:48
10.	"Chimera"	Antonino Spadaccino; Salvator Gabriel Valerio; Roberto Cardarelli	3:27
11.	"Schiena"	Alessandra Merola	5:12
Total length:			40:49

Schiena vs Schiena Edition – Double album and International edition bonus track (Disc 1)
No.	Title	Writer(s)	Length
12.	"La mia città"	Marrone	3:31

Schiena vs Schiena Edition – Double album bonus tracks (Disc 2)
No.	Title	Writer(s)	Length
1.	"Amami (Semi-Acoustic)"	Marrone	3:48
2.	"La mia felicità (Semi-Acoustic)"	Moro	3:30
3.	"Dimentico tutto (Semi-Acoustic)"	Tarducci; Bolchi	4:06
4.	"Ma che vita fai (Semi-Acoustic)"	Camba; Coro	3:28
5.	"Trattengo il fiato (Semi-Acoustic)"	Magro	4:05
6.	"1, 2, 3 (Semi-Acoustic)"	Magro	3:12
7.	"In ogni angolo di me (Semi-Acoustic)"	Marrone; Raina; Faini	3:52
8.	"L'amore non mi basta (Semi-Acoustic)"	Magro	3:53
9.	"Se rinasci (Semi-Acoustic)"	Agliardi; Faini	3:52
10.	"Chimera (Semi-Acoustic)"	Spadaccino; Valerio; Cardarelli	3:11
11.	"Schiena (Semi-Acoustic)"	Merola	5:19

== Charts ==
Chart	Peak position
Italian Albums (FIMI)	1
Swiss Albums (Schweizer Hitparade)	25

== Certifications ==
Certifications for Schiena
Region	Certification	Certified units/sales
Italy (FIMI)	3× Platinum	150,000^{*}
^{*} Sales figures based on certification alone.
