= Amami (Emma song) =

Single by Emma

from the album Schiena
- Released: 19 March 2013
- Genre: Pop rock
- Length: 3:38
- Label: Universal
- Songwriter: Emma Marrone
- Producer: Brando

Emma singles chronology
"Maledetto quel giorno" (2012)	"Amami" (2013)	"Dimentico tutto" (2013)

Music video
- "Amami" on YouTube

"Amami" is a song written and recorded by Italian singer Emma. It was released on 19 March 2013 through Universal Music Italy, as the lead single from her third studio album Schiena.

== Composition ==
"Amami" was written and composed by Marrone herself, produced by Brando and punctuated by Mylious Johnson's drums. The singer announced the song in preview on her official Facebook page, presenting the single with an introductory speech in which she stated that she wrote and composed the song at 3 a.m. while playing her guitar. The singer presented the song through the following statement:

"Taking a step forward is a natural condition, evolving, renewing oneself, trying, believing wholeheartedly in an idea, overcoming fears, prejudices, overcoming the idea one has of oneself. It happened at night, I turned on the light (not just the lamp) and my guitar did the rest. I played bass, it was the most natural thing in the world, I let out what I had been harbouring inside for a long time, a song. "Amami" was born, Emma was reborn, a new project, a new adventure, a new world all for us."

== Music video ==
The video, directed by Ludovico Galletti and Sami Schinaia and produced by lab35 FILMS, was made available on the singer's official Vevo channel on 22 March 2013.

== Charts ==
=== Weekly charts ===
Weekly chart performance for "Amami"
Chart (2013)	Peak position
Italy (FIMI)	3
Italy Airplay (EarOne)	6

=== Year-end charts ===
2024 year-end chart performance for "Amami"
Chart (2013)	Position
Italy (FIMI)	33

== Certifications ==
Certifications for "Amami"
Region	Certification	Certified units/sales
Italy (FIMI)	Platinum	30,000^{*}
^{*} Sales figures based on certification alone.
