= Gianni Bismark =

Italian rapper (born 1991)

- Born: Tiziano Menghi; January 19, 1991 (age 35); Rome, Italy
- Genres: Hip hop
- Occupations: Rapper; singer; songwriter
- Years active: 2015–present
- Labels: Triplosette Entertainment; Universal Music Group; Bombadischi

Tiziano Menghi (born 19 January 1991), known professionally as Gianni Bismark, is an Italian rapper and songwriter.

Menghi started recording his first pieces in 2015, under the alias of Gianni Bismark; his stage name, inspired by footballer Gianni Guigou, was given by his older brother Federico – and in the same year he publishes his debut mixtape, called Gianni Bismark Mixtape. Since 2016 he started collaborating with various exponents of the Roman trap scene, notably Dark Polo Gang, appearing in the mixtape of Pyrex, The Dark Album, in the track Latte di suocera. On December 20, 2016, Gianni Bismark released his first independent studio album, Sesto senso. In 2018 he joined Triplosette Entertainment, the independent record label of Dark Polo Gang, and then published his singles, Ci vedo lungo, and Serie B.

On January 4, 2019, Gianni Bismark published his single, Pregiudicati, featuring rapper Izi, who anticipated the release of his second album, titled Re senza corona, published on January 18, and from which, on April 14, he extracted the single For Real, which involved the collaboration of Dani Faiv. The album reached the 17th position of Classifica FIMI Album.

On March 6, 2020, Gianni Bismark released his single, Gianni nazionale, anticipating his third album, Nati diversi, published on March 27. The album debuted in 4th place in the charts, and eight of twelve tracks entered the top 100 of Top Singoli, for a total of over 5 million streams in the first week. On October 9, 2020, he published a second version of his record, called Nati Diversi - Ultima Cena, containing some unreleased tracks, also featuring Emma Marrone.

Thereafter, on December 1, 2021, he released his single, "C'avevo un amico", and, on February 17, 2022, "Febbre a febbraio", which involved the participation of Lil Kvneki, member of the famous duo Psicologi. These two singles anticipated the release of his fourth album "Bravi ragazzi", featuring Franco126 (Passerà), Ketama126 (Non mi va), Gemitaiz (Già l'ho vista), Speranza (Parole al vento), Lil Kvneki (Febbre a febbraio) and Jake La Furia (Fischio e tuta).

== Discography ==
=== Studio albums ===
- 2016 – Sesto senso
- 2019 – Re senza corona
- 2020 – Nati diversi
- 2022 – Bravi ragazzi

=== Mixtapes ===
- 2015 – Gianni Bismark Mixtape

=== Singles ===
- 2018 – Ci vedo lungo
- 2018 – Serie B
- 2018 – Gianni B
- 2019 – Pregiudicati (feat. Izi)
- 2019 – For Real (feat. Dani Faiv)
- 2020 – Gianni nazionale
- 2020 – C'hai ragione tu (feat. Emma Marrone)
- 2021 – C’avevo un amico

=== Collaborations ===
- 2019 – Pretty Solero, Ketama126 & Gianni Bismark – Non a me
- 2019 – Gionni Gioielli – Kuala Lumpur (feat. Gianni Bismark & Blo/B)
- 2019 – Oni One – Volti coperti (feat. Gianni Bismark)
- 2019 – Vaz Tè - Pesch'e vino (feat. Gianni Bismark & Bresh)
- 2020 – Ntò – Ti faccio ricca (feat. Gianni Bismark)
- 2020 – Dani Faiv – Facce finte (feat. Gianni Bismark)
- 2020 – Gianni Bismark & Gionni Gioielli – Matteo Salvini
