= Io di te non ho paura =

Single by Emma

from the album Adesso
- Released: 22 January 2016
- Genre: Pop
- Length: 3:34
- Label: Universal
- Songwriters: Sergio Vallarino; Giulia Anania; Marta Venturini
- Producers: Luca Mattioni; Emma

Emma singles chronology
"Arriverà l'amore" (2015)	"Io di te non ho paura" (2016)	"Il paradiso non esiste" (2016)

Music video
- "Io di te non ho paura" on YouTube

"Io di te non ho paura" (transl. "I am not afraid of you") is a song recorded by Italian singer Emma. It was released on 22 January 2016 through Universal Music Italy as the third single from her fourth studio album Adesso.

The song was featured in 2017 as the theme song for the film Girotondo directed by Tonino Abballe.

== Composition ==
The song was written by Sergio Vallarino, Giulia Anania and Marta Venturini, under the music production of Emma herself and Luca Mattioni. In an interview with Grazia, Emma explained the meaning of the song:

"I am no longer afraid of myself, of my limitations. The judgment of others no longer slaughters me. I used to cry over two lines written about me. I didn't resent those who criticized me, I resented me. I thought I really sucked, I thought I was all wrong. Now, when I read a heavy judgment, I think: well, that's your opinion. Mine is different."

== Music video ==
The music video for the song, directed by Luisa Carcavale, was released on January 22, 2016, through the singer's YouTube channel. The video feature Emma herself and Italian actor Francesco Arca.

== Charts ==
Chart (2015)	Peak position
Italy (FIMI)	65
Italy Airplay (EarOne)	13

== Certifications ==
Certifications for "Io di te non ho paura"
Region	Certification	Certified units/sales
Italy (FIMI)	Gold	25,000^{‡}
^{‡} Sales+streaming figures based on certification alone.
