= Taxi sulla Luna =

Single by Tony Effe and Emma

from the album Icon and Souvenir
- Language: Italian
- Released: 9 June 2023
- Genre: Trap-pop
- Length: 2:23
- Label: Universal; Capitol
- Songwriters: Nicolò Rapisarda; Paolo Antonacci; Alessandro Merli; Fabio Clemente
- Producer: Takagi & Ketra

Tony Effe singles chronology
"Boss" (2023)	"Taxi sulla Luna" (2023)	"Particolari sporchi" (2024)

Emma Marrone singles chronology
"Mezzo mondo" (2023)	"Taxi sulla Luna" (2023)	"Iniziamo dalla fine" (2023)

Music video
- "Taxi sulla Luna" on YouTube

"Taxi sulla Luna" is a song by Italian rapper Tony Effe and Italian singer Emma Marrone. It was released on 9 June 2023 through Universal Music Group and Capitol Records, as the second single from the rapper's second studio album Icon and later included in Emma's seventh studio album album Souvenir.

== Composition ==
The song is the first featuring between the two artists, mixing dance-pop and rap sounds. In an interview with All Music Italia, Emma explained the meaning of the song and the decision to collaborate with the rapper:

It was an unexpected collaboration. I got the track, I liked it because I could and wanted to have fun with it. I thought it was spinning great, and in fact it made people dance all summer and still does. I wanted to put it on the record because it was, and is, part of the path that brought me here today.

== Critics reception ==
Alessandro Alicandri of TV Sorrisi e Canzoni wrote that the meeting of Tony Effe's rap world and Emma's pop world generate "a very interesting point of contact" from a musical point of view, in which the singer was able to approach trap in a "free and carefree way, playing subtraction with her voice and pointing". The journalist appreciated Takagi & Ketra's production dictated by a "90s deep house base, totally club-like".

Claudio Cabona of Rockol described the collaboration as “crazy and fun” although it “only half works” since it “does not appear completely in focus, giving up on finding a credible fit between the two artists.” Cabona pointed out that while the rapper “snares irreverent and ironic bars,” Emma's refrain seems “alien compared to the rest of the song.” Gabriele Fazio of Agenzia Giornalistica Italia wrote that Taxi sulla Luna is “not a song, but a recipe, all in all successful,” even if it is “a catchphrase that in a handful of weeks we will put away to rot.”

== Music video ==
The music video for the song, directed by Late Milk, was released the same day of the single, through the rapper's YouTube channel.

== Charts ==
Chart performance for "Taxi sulla Luna"
Chart (2023)	Peak position
Italy (FIMI)	7
Italy (Airplay)	47

=== Year-end charts ===
2023 year-end chart performance for "Taxi sulla Luna"
Chart (2023)	Position
Italy (FIMI)	33

2024 year-end chart performance for "Taxi sulla Luna"
Chart (2024)	Position
Italy (FIMI)	66

== Certifications ==
Certifications for "Taxi sulla Luna"
Region	Certification	Certified units/sales
Italy (FIMI)	4× Platinum	400,000^{‡}
^{‡} Sales+streaming figures based on certification alone.
