= La mia città =

2014 song by Emma Marrone

Single by Emma

from the album Schiena vs. Schiena
- Released: 9 May 2014
- Recorded: 2014
- Genre: Rock; Eurodance
- Length: 3:31
- Label: Universal
- Songwriter: Emma Marrone
- Producer: Brando

Emma singles chronology
"Trattengo il fiato" (2014)	"La mia città" (2014)	"Resta ancora un po'" (2014)

Music video
- "La mia città" on YouTube

Eurovision Song Contest 2014 entry
- Country: Italy
- Artist: Emma Marrone
- Language: Italian
- Composer: Emma Marrone
- Lyricist: Emma Marrone

Finals performance
- Final result: 21st
- Final points: 33

Entry chronology
- ◄ "L'essenziale" (2013)
- "Grande amore" (2015) ►

Song presentation
- file; help

Official performance video
- "La mia città" (Final) on YouTube

"La mia città" (English: My city) is a song written and recorded by Italian singer Emma. It was released on 9 May 2014 through Universal Music Group and added in the deluxe edition of the singer's third studio album Schiena, subtitled Schiena vs. Schiena. It was chosen by Italy's public broadcaster RAI to represent the country at the Eurovision Song Contest 2014.

The song received only 33 points in the final vote, ranking at 21st place out of 26 in the final ranking of the competition. This represents one of the worst placements in Italy's Eurovision Song Contest history – its lowest ever finish by absolute finishing position, although not its worst relative finish or score (having previously finished 17th and joint-last with nul points in the 1966 contest with Domenico Modugno's "Dio, come ti amo").

== Charts ==
Chart (2014)	Peak position
Austria (Ö3 Austria Top 40)	71
Italy (FIMI)	24

== Certifications ==
Region	Certification	Certified units/sales
Italy (FIMI)	Gold	15,000^{‡}
^{‡} Sales+streaming figures based on certification alone.

== See also ==
- Italy in the Eurovision Song Contest 2014
