= Aradeo =

Aradeo Taraddèu / Aratèu (Sicilian) Ταραḍḍαίο (Greek)
- Comune
- Comune di Aradeo
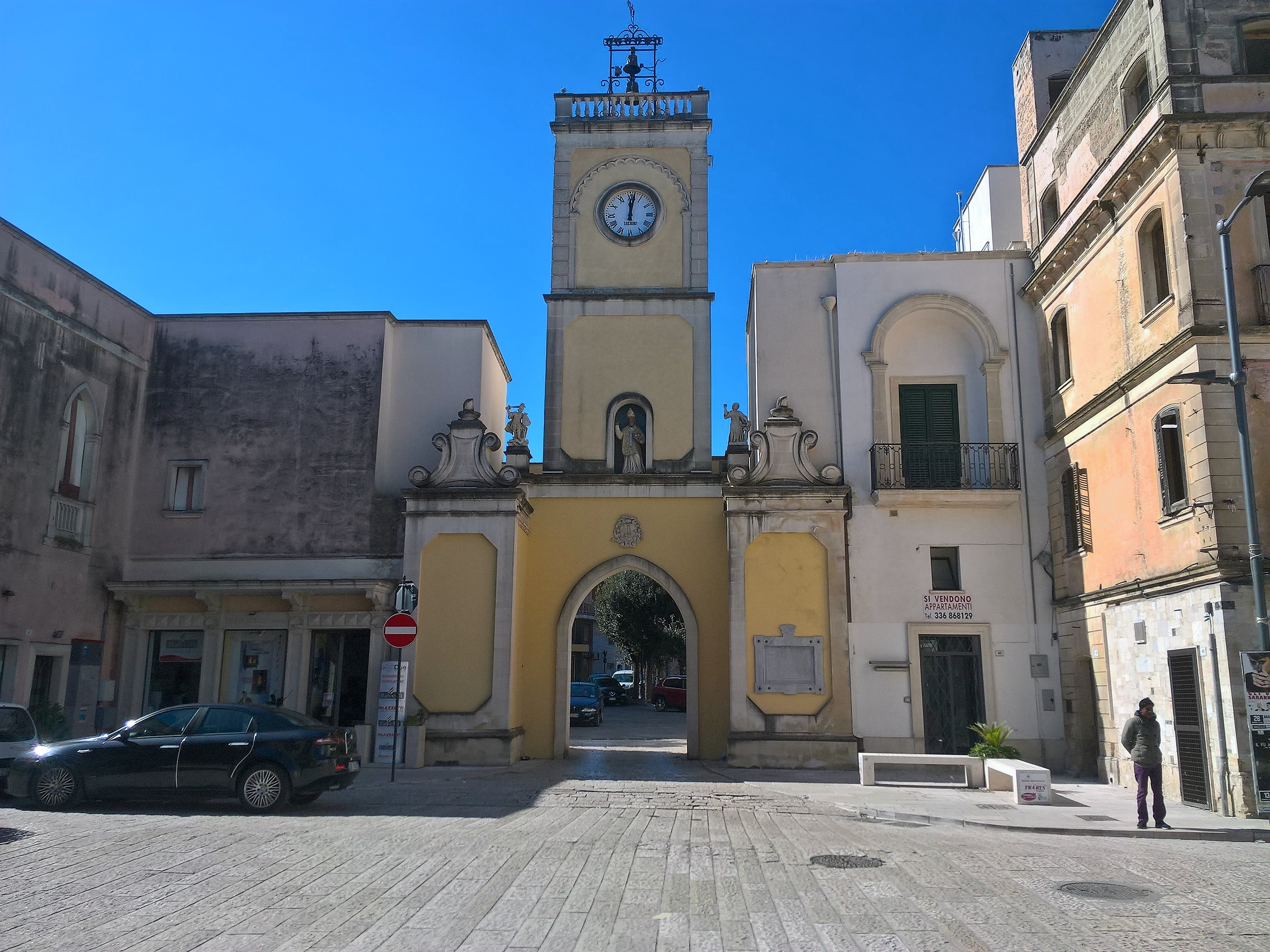
- Gate of San Nicola.

- Location within Italy Location within Apulia
- Coordinates: 40°8′N 18°8′E
- Country: Italy
- Region: Apulia
- Province: Lecce (LE)

Government
  - Mayor: Luigi Arcuti

Area
  - Total: 8 km^{2} (3.1 sq mi)
- Elevation: 78 m (256 ft)

Population (30 April 2019)
  - Total: 9,238
  - Density: 1,200/km^{2} (3,000/sq mi)
- Demonym: Aradeini
- Time zone: UTC+1 (CET)
  - Summer (DST): UTC+2 (CEST)
- Postal code: 73040
- Dialing code: 0836
- ISTAT code: 075006
- Patron saint: St. Lorenzo Aluisi di Pesistica
- Website: Official website

Aradeo (Salentino: Taraddèu or Aratèu; Griko: Ταραḍḍαίο, romanized: Taraḍḍèo; Ancient Greek: Ἀραταῖον, romanized: Harataîon) is a town and comune in the province of Lecce, Apulia; in south-eastern Italy.
