= Ogni volta è così =

Single by Emma
- Released: 3 February 2022
- Genre: Pop rock
- Length: 3:27
- Label: Universal
- Songwriters: Emma Marrone; Davide Petrella; Dario Faini
- Producer: Dardust

Emma singles chronology
"Che sogno incredibile" (2021)	"Ogni volta è così" (2022)	"Mezzo mondo" (2023)

Music video
- "Ogni volta è così" on YouTube

"Ogni volta è così" is a song co-written and recorded by Italian singer Emma. It was released on 3 February 2022 through Universal Music Italy.

The song competed during the Sanremo Music Festival 2022, making the singer's third participation at the contest, the first since her win with "Non è l'inferno" in 2012; it premiered during the second night of the music show. The song placed sixth in the final ranking.

== Composition ==
The song was written by the singer herself with Davide Petrella and Dario Faini, who produced the track. Emma explained the meaning the song in an interview with Billboard Italia:

"The text starts off straight. I turn to a him: do you see him as you are? Give up. In general, we have to accept that we are behind in Italy because we still live in a patriarchal country. It is a problem for men if the woman makes good money and is successful. Women like that have a hard time finding an egalitarian relationship; they either take a step back or stand alone. This is the concept behind the expression "We are either saints or whores." The "whores" refers not only to the sexual sphere indeed but to women who are not accepted because they are too free"

Concerning her participation in the Sanremo Music Festival 2022 without a larger record project, Emma said in an interview in October 2023 for Il Fatto Quotidiano that she took part for her father, who was ill with leukemia at the time and died the following September 4:

"Two years ago my participation fell by the wayside because I went because of a personal choice. My father was already seriously ill and I wanted to give him one last memory. So once the lights of that Sanremo were turned off, I no longer promoted the song."

== Reception ==
Francesco Chignola of TV Sorrisi e Canzoni was particularly impressed by the song's arrangement "in which the singer sincerely confronts a love dragged by the words." Il Messaggero dwelled on the meaning, reporting that "Ogni Volta è Così" is not just a love song, but a song that tells of a condition that many women experience and in which they may find themselves."

Vincenzo Nasto of Fanpage.it wrote that it is "a song that could be part of the singer's repertoire of cult songs" because it describes "a love story that also pays homage to the women of Italian music of the past, such as artistic godmother Loredana Bertè." All Music Italia welcomed the song's invitation "to surrender, to abandon the war of the strongest, and to lose themselves in each other" in a "moment of total love, made of sensuality and trust."

Reviewing the song for Il Sole 24 Ore, Francesco Prisco wrote "everything passes, even the most beautiful love stories end, and poor Emma, with a song written by Davide Petrella and Dardust, gets sad, on a vindictive refrain." Andrea Conti of Il Fatto Quotidiano described the singer's new project as "a power ballad and an invitation to the loved one: 'Surrender tonight'" being particularly impressed by the singer's arrangement and voice.

== Music video ==
The music video for the song was directed by Lorenzo Silvestri and Andrea Santaterra, aka Bendo, and was released in conjunction with the single's release.

The video was described by All Music Italia as "aesthetic, in which the viewer is projected into a universe steeped in dark and futuristic atmospheres." In particular, Emma was compared to "an android, [...] whose nature, appearance and character are the result of a world in which homologation is so ingrained that she loses awareness of it," who nevertheless takes an attitude of rebellion against the system by "becoming aware of her own will and making her voice come through loudly."

== Charts ==
Chart (2022)	Peak position
Italy (FIMI)	13
Italy (Airplay)	27
San Marino (SMRRTV Top 50)	36
Switzerland (Schweizer Hitparade)	96

== Certifications ==
Certifications for "Ogni volta è così"
Region	Certification	Certified units/sales
Italy (FIMI)	Platinum	100,000^{‡}
^{‡} Sales+streaming figures based on certification alone.
