= Essere qui =

2018 studio album by Emma

Studio album by Emma
- Released: 26 January 2018
- Recorded: 2017
- Studio: Milan (Officine Meccaniche)
- Genre: Pop rock
- Length: 42:46
- Label: Universal
- Producer: Luca Mattioni; Emma Marrone

Emma chronology
| Adesso (2015) | Essere qui (2018) | Fortuna (2019) |

Singles from Essere qui
- 1. "L'isola" Released: 5 January 2018; 2. "Effetto domino" Released: 2 March 2018; 3. "Mi parli piano" Released: 4 May 2018; 4. "Mondiale" Released: 2 November 2018

Essero qui is the fifth studio album by Italian singer-songwriter Emma, released by Universal Music Italy on 26 January 2018.

The album peaked at number two on the Italian Albums Chart, being certified platinum by FIMI. On 16 November 2018 the album was reissued titled Essere qui - Boom Edition.

== Background and composition ==
After her fourth studio album Adesso, published in 2015, Emma co-hostet the Sanremo Music Festival and became coach of the TV talent show Amici di Maria De Filippi alongside singer-songwriter Elisa between 2015 and 2017 seasons. Emma announced her fifth studio album during 2017 New Year's Eve on her social networks publishing the artwork.

Essere qui is the second recording project produced by the singer herself with Luca Mattioni. It featured several artists on the composition and songwriting process, including Giuliano Sangiorgi, Federica Abbate, Davide Petrella, Dario Faini, Roberto Casalino, Giovanni Caccamo and Alessandra Flora.

== Promotion ==
The lead single "L'isola" was published on 5 January 2015. It was followed by "Effetto domino" released on 2 March 2018. From April to May 2018 Emma embarks on the Essere Qui Tour, promoted by the single "Mi parli piano" released on May 2, 2018.

On 16 November 2018 the album was reissued titled Essere qui - Boom Edition, promoted by the fourth and final single "Mondiale" was published on 2 November 2018. The new album edition was followed by the second half of the promotional tour from February to March 2019.

== Critic reception ==
The album received generally positive reviews by the Italian music critics.

== Track listing ==
Essere qui – Standard track listing
| No. | Title | Lyrics | Music | Producer(s) | Length |
|---|---|---|---|---|---|
| 1. | "L'isola" | Roberto Angelini; Domenico Canu; Marco Baroni | Angelini; Canu | Luca Mattioni; Emma Marrone | 4:18 |
| 2. | "Le ragazze come me" | Davide Petrella | Dario Faini | Mattioni; Marrone | 3:25 |
| 3. | "Sottovoce" | Giovanni Pollex; Leonardo Lamacchia | Pollex; Lamacchia; Roberto Gulielmini; Stefano Milella | Mattioni; Marrone | 3:15 |
| 4. | "Mi parli piano" | Roberto Casalino; Davide Simonetta | Simonetta | Mattioni; Marrone | 3:24 |
| 5. | "Effetto domino" | Petrella | Petrella; Federica Abbate; Fabio Gargiulo | Mattioni; Marrone | 3:43 |
| 6. | "Le cose che penso" | Erika Mineo | Mineo | Mattioni; Marrone | 4:02 |
| 7. | "Portami via da te" | Giuliano Sangiorgi | Sangiorgi | Mattioni; Marrone | 3:47 |
| 8. | "Luna e l'altra" | Giulia Anania; Andrea Bonomo | Simone Benussi | Mattioni; Marrone | 3:48 |
| 9. | "Malelingue" | Casalino; Niccolò Verrienti | Casalino | Mattioni; Marrone | 3:40 |
| 10. | "Sorrido lo stesso" | Emma Marrone; Giovanni Caccamo; Alessandra Flora | Marrone | Mattioni; Marrone | 3:19 |
| 11. | "Coraggio" | Alessandra Merola | Merola | Mattioni; Marrone | 6:04 |
| Total length: | | | | | 42:46 |

Essere qui: Boom edition – Deluxe edition bonus tracks
| No. | Title | Lyrics | Music | Producer(s) | Length |
|---|---|---|---|---|---|
| 1. | "Mondiale" | Lorenzo Urcillo; Matteo Mobrici; Federico Nardelli | Urcillo; Mobrici; Nardelli | Mattioni; Marrone | 3:34 |
| 2. | "Incredibile voglia di niente" | Marrone; Diego Mancino | Marrone; Mancino; Faini | Mattioni; Marrone | 3:33 |
| 3. | "Nucleare" | Urcillo; Luca Serpenti; Enrico Lanza | Urcillo; Serpenti; Lanza | Mattioni; Marrone | 4:11 |
| 4. | "Inutile canzone" | Marrone | Marrone | Mattioni; Marrone | 6:22 |
| Total length: | | | | | 59:46 |

== Charts ==
Chart performance for Essere qui
| Chart (2018) | Peak position |
|---|---|
| Italian Albums (FIMI) | 2 |
| Swiss Albums (Schweizer Hitparade) | 16 |

=== Year-end charts ===
Year-end chart performance for "Essere qui"
| Chart (2015) | Rank |
|---|---|
| Italy (FIMI) | 15 |

== Certifications ==
Certifications for Essere qui
| Region | Certification | Certified units/sales |
|---|---|---|
| Italy (FIMI) | Platinum | 50,000^{‡} |
^{‡} Sales+streaming figures based on certification alone.
