= Mezzo mondo =

Single by Emma

from the album Souvenir
- Released: 28 April 2023
- Genre: Pop
- Length: 3:34
- Label: Universal
- Songwriters: Katoo; Zef
- Producers: Emma Marrone; Francesco Tarducci; Jacopo Ettorre; Francesco Catitti

Emma singles chronology
"Ogni volta è così" (2022)	"Mezzo mondo" (2023)	"Taxi sulla Luna" (2023)

Music video
- "Mezzo mondo" on YouTube

"Mezzo mondo" (lit. 'Half of the world') is a song co-written and recorded by Italian singer Emma. It was released on 28 April 2023 through Universal Music Italy, as the lead single from her seventh studio album Souvenir.

== Composition ==
The song was written by the singer herself with Nesli, Jacopo Ettore and Francesco "Katoo" Catitti, who also handled the production together with Zef. In an interview with Radio Zeta, Marroneexplained the meaning of the song:

""Mezzo mondo" comes from thirteen years of music and experiences. We have done half the world, now we will do the other half with the desire to do well and have fun. [...] it talks about wanting to come back with a different spirit, with a lighter form. I felt like saying I've been through a lot and I feel like coming back. Lightness, not superficiality. I have touched very high peaks and very deep black holes, the result is this balance that is found at the end, and if it can be of support for someone else I am"

== Reception ==
Alessandro Alicandri of TV Sorrisi e Canzoni found Alicandri also found in the lyrics the description of two worlds: "on the one hand the oppressive one of everyday life, [...] on the other hand 'homecoming' in which one glimpses roots, simplicity, people without superstructures." Fabio Fiume of All Music Italia gave the song a score of 7.5 out of 10, describing it as a "new lifeblood" for Marrone, "without distorting herself, without clashing with the story she has written so far." Fiume appreciated the song's hook and bridge, noting that the notes in the aside become "befitting of a voice as important as hers."

Mattia Marzi of Rockol described the song as "fresh, summery, easygoing" between "contemporary and retro" combining string instruments and electronic music. Marzi finds in the words of the song "the consciousness and maturity" of the singer. Gabriele Fazio of Agenzia Giornalistica Italia wrote that Mezzo mondo gives a chance for "Emma's character to come out in a more honest way," deeming it "one of the best tracks in the entire discography" of the singer. Fazio stressed the song presents "excellent insights" musically, recalling a pop with "brighter colors and, above all, authenticity." Fanpage.it claimed that Marrone turns out "not to be taken for granted; [...] she has no fear of throwing herself headlong into a summer piece" as she "takes on the responsibility of becoming a catchphrase but with intelligence."

== Music video ==
The music video for the song, directed by Asia J. Lanni and Nicola Bussei, was filmed in Linguaglossa, Sicily, and released on May 8, 2023 through the singer's YouTube channel.

== Charts ==
Chart (2023)	Peak position
Italy (FIMI)	38
Italy (EarOne Airplay)	8
San Marino (SMRRTV Top 50)	11

== Certifications ==
Certifications for "Mezzo mondo"
Region	Certification	Certified units/sales
Italy (FIMI)	Platinum	100,000^{‡}
^{‡} Sales+streaming figures based on certification alone.
