= Arriverà l'amore =

Single by Emma

from the album Adesso
- Released: 23 October 2015
- Genre: Power ballad
- Length: 3:35
- Label: Universal
- Songwriters: Ermal Meta; Matteo Buzzanca
- Producers: Luca Mattioni; Emma

Emma singles chronology
"Occhi profondi" (2015)	"Arriverà l'amore" (2015)	"Io di te non ho paura" (2016)

Music video
- "Arriverà l'amore" on YouTube

"Arriverà l'amore" ("Love Will Come") is a song recorded by Italian singer Emma. It was released on 23 October 2015 through Universal Music Italy as the second single from her fourth studio album Adesso.

The song peaked at number five on the Italian singles chart, being certified platinum by FIMI.

== Composition ==
The song was written by Ermal Meta and Matteo Buzzanca, produced by the singer herself with Luca Mattioni. Compared to previous releases, it features elements of an electronic music with electric guitars and strings directed by Fabio Gurian. Emma explained the meaning of the song:

"The love of a little girl for her dream, the love that breaks before the eyes of the smallest and helpless, the love that cannot be said, the love that someone does not yet want to see but exists, the love for oneself that very often fails as the confidence and courage to continue to believe in something true. Love has many forms and many lives, it dies and regenerates stronger than before, love should come before everything. Love comes into our lives. Love heals. Love does not hurt, mock or kill anyone.... I sing this love because I believe in it! I put my soul and face into it without lowering my gaze. With a clean heart you can go anywhere without being afraid."

== Critics reception ==
Massimiliano Longo of All Music Italia described Arriverà l'amore as "an energetic ballad full of positivity and enthusiasm" thanks to the presence of "guitars, strings and woodwinds" intertwined with electronics, appreciating the singer's "new artistic dimension" in the role of producer. Francesco Raiola Fanpage.it pointed out that love is "one of the singer's favorite themes" that in the song "is declined in an optimistic way, in a vision of expectation and hope," pointing out that musically she is close to Gianna Nannini. Mattia Marzi of Rockol also associated the song to Nannini discography, appreciating the "electric guitars coexisting with strings" by Gurian.

== Music video ==
The music video for the song, directed by Luisa Carcavale e Alessandro Guida, was released on October 23, 2015, through the singer's YouTube channel.

== Charts ==
Chart (2015)	Peak position
Italy (FIMI)	5
Italy Airplay (EarOne)	5

== Certifications ==
Certifications for "Arriverà l'amore"
Region	Certification	Certified units/sales
Italy (FIMI)	Platinum	50,000^{‡}
^{‡} Sales+streaming figures based on certification alone.
