= A me piace così =

Studio album by Emma
- Released: 19 October 2010
- Recorded: 2010
- Genre: Pop
- Length: 42:31 (Standard edition); 73:12 (Special Edition); 53:00 (Sanremo Edition)
- Label: Universal
- Producer: Fabrizio Barbacci; Pino Perris

Emma chronology
Oltre (2010)	A me piace così (2010)	Sarò libera (2011)

Singles from A me piace così
- 1. "Con le nuvole" Released: 24 September 2010; 2. "Cullami" Released: 19 November 2010; 3. "Arriverà" Released: 16 February 2011; 4. "Io son per te l'amore" Released: 15 April 2011

A me piace così is the debut studio album by Italian singer Emma, released on 19 October 2010 by Universal Music Group.

The record, preceded by the single "Con le nuvole", consists of twelve tracks, including a cover song of "La lontananza" by Domenico Modugno. In November, it was released a special reissue of the album, featuring the tracklist of A me piace cosi with the addition of all the tracks of the singer's debut extended play Oltre and two unreleased tracks: "L'amore che ho", written by Neffa and the cover of "(Sittin' On) The Dock of the Bay", performed with Craig David and also included in the digital version of David's album Signed Sealed Delivered (2010).

In February 2011, following the participation of the singer during the Sanremo Music Festival 2011, her entry Arriverà", performed with Italian pop rock band Modà, was added in a Sanremo Special edition of the record, also featuring two new songs: the single "Io son per te l'amore" and "Per sempre".

The album was certified Double platinum by the Federation of the Italian Music Industry. In Switzerland the album reached the 50th position of the Swiss Music Charts, remaining in the charts for the next three weeks.

== Track listing ==
A me piace così – Standard track listing
No.	Title	Lyrics	Music	Length
1.	"Ho toccato il cielo"	Annalisa Sacchezin	Luca Chiaravalli	3:36
2.	"Cullami"	Roberto Casalino	Casalino	3:45
3.	"Con le nuvole"	Casalino	Casalino; Dario Faini	3:28
4.	"La lontananza" (originally performed by Domenico Modugno)	Domenico Modugno; Enrica Bonaccorti	Modugno	2:57
5.	"Petali"	Antonio Galbiati; Faini	Galbiati; Faini	3:32
6.	"Dimmi che senso ha"	Galbiati; Faini	Galbiati; Faini	3:28
7.	"Arida"	Casalino	Casalino; Galbiati	3:30
8.	"Emozioniamoci ora"	Massimo Greco	Greco	3:38
9.	"Purché tua"	Greco; Deborah Falanga	Greco; Falanga	3:40
10.	"Dalle vene"	Antonio Calò; Saverio Grandi	Calò; Grandi	3:17
11.	"Colori"	Roberto Angelini	Angelini	3:45
12.	"On Line"	Galbiati; Falanga	Galbiati; Falanga	3:08

A me piace così: Special Edition – Deluxe edition bonus tracks
No.	Title	Lyrics	Music	Length
1.	"Sembra strano"	Federica Camba; Daniele Coro	Camba; Coro	3:36
2.	"L'esigenza di te"	Camba; Coro	Camba; Coro	3:28
3.	"Calore"	Angelini	Angelini	3:24
4.	"Meravigliosa"	Galbiati; Fortunato Zampaglione	Galbiati; Zampaglione	3:39
5.	"Un sogno a costo zero"	Camba; Coro	Camba; Coro	3:11
6.	"Davvero"	Camba; Coro	Camba; Coro	3:48
7.	"Folle paradiso"	Camba; Coro	Camba; Coro	3:33
8.	"(Sittin' On) The Dock of the Bay" (featuring Craig David; originally performed by Otis Redding)	Otis Ray Redding Jr.; Stephen Lee Cropper	Redding Jr.; Cropper	3:38
21.	"L'amore che ho"	Giovanni Pellino	Pellino	3:08

A me piace così: Sanremo Edition – Limited edition bonus tracks
No.	Title	Lyrics	Music	Length
1.	"Arriverà" (with Modà)	Francesco Silvestre	Silvestre; Enrico Palmosi; Enrico Zapparoli	3:33
2.	"Io son per te l'amore"	Silvestre	Silvestre; Orazio Grillo	3:46
3.	"Per sempre"	Silvestre	Silvestre; Grillo	3:54

== Charts ==
Chart	Peak position
Italian Albums (FIMI)	2
Swiss Albums (Schweizer Hitparade)	50

== A me piace cosi Tour ==
A me piace cosi Tour
- Tour by Emma Marrone
- Location: Italy
- Associated album: A me piace così, Oltre
- Start date: 8 June 2011
- End date: 16 July 2011
- No. of shows: 23 (Italy); 1 (Slovenia)

Emma Marrone concert chronology
- Ahi ce sta passu Tour; A me piace cosi Tour; Sarò libera Tour

On March 15, 2011, Emma has opened the only Italian date of the tour of Taylor Swift, while the previous month at the beginning of the A me piace cosi tour, she opened for three dates of the tour of Gianna Nannini. To coincide with the tour, she opened two dates for Vasco Rossi during Vasco Live Kom '011. The tour began with the zero date 8 June 2011 and June 10, 2011 made a stop in Slovenia. She continued the tour in Italy from June 15, 2011 until July 16, 2011, stopping in the following cities:

=== Date ===
1. 8 June Porto San Giorgio (FM) - Palasavelli
2. 10 June Nova Gorica (GO) - Park Casinò
3. 15 June Balvano (PZ) - Area mercato di Balvano
4. 16 June Naples (NA) - Mostra d'Oltremare
5. 18 June Pontedera (PI) - Piazza notte bianca
6. 25 June Piazzola sul Brenta (PD) - Anfiteatro Camerini - Live Festival
7. 26 June Monza (MB) - Cortile della villa reale - Monzaestate 2011
8. 30 June Parma (PR) - Eurotorri
9. 3 July Caltanissetta (CL) - Campo sportivo di Caltanissetta
10. 5 July Lamezia Terme (CZ) - Campo sportivo Guido D'Ippolito
11. 6 July Noci (BA) - Foro Boario di Noci
12. 8 July Scorrano (LE) - Campo sportivo
13. 9 July Castrovillari (CS) - Piazza
14. 10 July San Vito dei Normanni (BR) - Piazza
15. 12 July Grugliasco (TO) - Le gru
16. 13 July Varallo (VC) - Piazza
17. 15 July Savona (SV) - Stadio Bacigalupo
18. 16 July Ventimiglia (IM) - Piazza

support

1. 15 March Milan (MI) - Mediolanum Forum - Support Taylor Swift
2. 4 May Rome (RO) - PalaLottomatica - Support Gianna Nannini
3. 5 May Rome (RO) - PalaLottomatica - Support Gianna Nannini
4. 14 May Caserta (CA) - PalaMaggiò - Support Gianna Nannini
5. 21 June Milan (MI) - Stadio Giuseppe Meazza - Support Vasco Rossi
6. 22 June Milan (MI) - Stadio Giuseppe Meazza - Support Vasco Rossi

=== Setlist ===
1. Ho toccato il cielo
2. Emozioniamoci ora
3. Cullami
4. Sembra strano
5. On line
6. Folle Paradiso
7. Dimmi che senso ha
8. La lontananza
9. L'esigenza di te
10. Valerie
11. L'amore che ho
12. Per sempre
13. Petali
14. Dalle vene
15. Meravigliosa
16. Purché tua
17. Arida
18. Davvero
19. Con le nuvole
20. Oro nero
21. Colori
22. Io son per te l'amore
23. America
24. Calore
25. Arriverà

=== Band ===
- Flavio Pasquetto: Electric guitars and acoustic guitars
- Simone De Filippis: Electric guitars and acoustic guitars
- Luca Cirillo: Keyboard
- Daniele Formica: Drums
- Pietro Casadei: Electric bass
