= Occhi profondi =

Single by Emma

from the album Adesso
- Released: 19 June 2015
- Studio: London (Abbey Road Studios)
- Genre: Pop rock
- Length: 3:08
- Label: Universal
- Songwriters: Ermal Meta; Dario Faini
- Producers: Luca Mattioni; Emma

Emma singles chronology
"Resta ancora un po'" (2014)	"Occhi profondi" (2015)	"Arriverà l'amore" (2015)

Music video
- Occhi profondi on YouTube

"Occhi profondi" is a song recorded by Italian singer Emma. It was released on 19 June 2015 through Universal Music Italy as the lead single from her fourth studio album Adesso.

The song peaked at number thirteen on the Italian singles chart, being certified double platinum by FIMI.

== Composition and release ==
Announced on June 18, 2015, "Occhi profondi" was composed by Ermal Meta and Dario Faini and mixed at Abbey Road Studios in London. About the single, Emma presented it with a public statement:

"I couldn't wait any longer [...] I felt like sharing with all of you this piece of life, a taste of the new record I've been working on for a while now and in which I'm investing so much courage and so much love."

== Reception ==
Alessandro Alicanti of Panorama wrote that although the introduction "leaves you a bit disoriented" because of the guitar and spoken stanzas, the song "like a landmine explodes into a hypnotic chorus." Alicanti reports that Marrone's voice expresses "the weight of her truth like a boulder" in a song that "is not consoling" but "confronts you with your truth." Oriana Meo of All Music Italia described the refrain of the song "energetic and impactful," with the artist fully expressing the feeling of anger.

== Music video ==
The video, made available on June 19 through the singer's official YouTube channel, was directed by Luigi Antonini and Giuliano Peparini.

== Charts ==
Chart (2015)	Peak position
Italy (FIMI)	13

=== Year-end charts ===
Year-end chart performance for "Occhi profondi"
Chart (2015)	Rank
Italy (FIMI)	81

== Certifications ==
Certifications for "Occhi profondi"
Region	Certification	Certified units/sales
Italy (FIMI)	2× Platinum	100,000^{‡}
^{‡} Sales+streaming figures based on certification alone.
