= Mi parli piano =

Single by Emma

from the album Essere qui
- Released: 4 May 2018
- Genre: Pop rock
- Length: 3:24
- Label: Universal Music Italy
- Songwriters: Davide Simonetta; Roberto Casalino
- Producers: Luca Mattioni; Emma

Emma singles chronology
"Effetto domino" (2018)	"Mi parli piano" (2018)	"Mondiale" (2018)

Music video
- "Mi parli piano" on YouTube

"Mi parli piano" is a song recorded by Italian singer Emma. It was released on 4 May 2018 through Universal Music Italy as the third single from her fifth studio album Essere qui.

== Composition ==
The song, written by Dario Simonetta and Roberto Casalino, explresses the deal with the complexity of relationships and the lack of communication with pop-rock sounds. Marrone herself also added that the two issues lead to "ever-higher walls that limit us in our externalizations and the presumption of thinking that time will always be on our side."

== Critics reception ==
Alessandro Alicandri of TV Sorrisi e Canzoni described the single as "among the strongest on the album," particularly appreciating the work of Casalino, who "proves to be one of the best and brightest songwriters of this generation."

== Music video ==
The music video for the song, directed by Luisa Carcavale e Alessandro Guida, was released on May 5, 2018, through the singer's YouTube channel. The video was filmed in Las Vegas and Nevada desert; the singer explained the meaning of the visual project in an interview for Corriere della Sera:

"It is a video where the shortcomings that any of us might have are highlighted as well as the things that we all seek such as hope, love, the desire to surrender in a hug and to feel understood and protected especially in this moment in history where there are billions of ways to communicate but the courage and desire to do so by looking each other in the eye and openly telling each other the truth is increasingly lacking."

== Charts ==
Chart (2015)	Peak position
Italy (FIMI)	46
Italy Airplay (EarOne)	19

== Certifications ==
Certifications for "Mi parli piano"
Region	Certification	Certified units/sales
Italy (FIMI)	Gold	25,000^{‡}
^{‡} Sales+streaming figures based on certification alone.
