= Adesso (Emma Marrone album) =

2015 studio album by Emma

Studio album by Emma
- Released: 27 November 2015
- Studios: London (Abbey Road Studios); Milan (Stripe Studio; Divi Studio); Rome (Forward Studio)
- Genres: Pop; rock; electronic
- Length: 46:36
- Label: Universal
- Producers: Luca Mattioni; Emma Marrone

Emma chronology
Schiena (2013)	Adesso (2015)	Essere qui (2018)

Singles from Souvenir
- 1. "Occhi profondi" Released: 19 June 2015; 2. "Arriverà l'amore" Released: 23 October 2015; 3. "Io di te non ho paura" Released: 22 January 2015; 4. "Il paradiso non esiste" Released: 29 April 2016; 5. "Libre" Released: 9 September 2016; 6. "Quando le canzoni finiranno" Released: 18 November 2016

Adesso is the fourth studio album by Italian singer-songwriter Emma, released by Universal Music Italy on 27 November 2015.

The album was promoted by several singles, including "Occhi profondi", "Arriverà l'amore" and "Io di te non ho paura". It peaked at number two on the Italian Albums Chart and was certified double platinum by FIMI. On 2 December 2016 the album was reiussed as Adesso Tour Edition with two bonus tracks and the collaboration "Libre" with Álvaro Soler.

== Composition ==
The album features thirteen tracks all produced by Luca Mattioni and Marrone herself, becoming the first album entirely produced by the singer. The tracks were inspired by pop rock and electronic music. In an interview with Rockol the singer told about the process of production with Mattioni, sound decisions and recording of the songs:

"I aimed to make a record the old-fashioned way, choosing people well. For example, Luca Mattioni: he worked a lot abroad, he is someone like me who talks little and works a lot in the studio, very little talk. [...] I had a clear idea of the tracks, the sound I wanted in them, the mix between genres. I nagged Luca to arrive at this sound. I'm not new to electronics-it's just the first time I've used it in front of a large audience. I was born with these sounds, I had a trio doing electronic music and even before Amici I participated in the Sziget Festival, when it didn't yet have the name and importance it has now. I took the opposite path of other people-I didn't start from pop to get to ghetto, I started from ghetto to get to pop"

The tracks were being composed by different authors, including Dario Faini, Diego Mancino, Ermal Meta, Giuseppe Anastasi and Giuliano Sangiorgi. In an interview with Vanity Fair Italia, Emma Marrone explained the decision of the collaborations on the writing process:

"I surrounded myself with people who helped me, this record is the fruit of a group work, it is the record of bets, full of very young authors, without the cool duet to make people talk about the record. These are songs born among friends, around a little beer on the Milan Navigli or born after a chat, without that commercial contamination generated by the anxiety of going out on the market."

== Promotion ==
The lead single "Occhi profondi" was published on 19 June 2015. It was followed by "Arriverà l'amore" on 23 October 2015, which anticipated the album published on 27 November 2015. On 22 January 2015 "Io non ho paura" was released as the third single. After "Il paradiso non esisite", Emma collaborated on the Italian version of "Libre" by Álvaro Soler. The last single from the album was "Quando le canzoni finiranno" on 18 November 2016.

Between September and October 2016 Emma embraced the Adesso Tour in Italy. On 2 December 2024 the album was reissued with the titled Adesso Tour Edition with two bonus tracks while the related DVD featured the live recorded track from the tour.

== Critics reception ==
The album received generally positive reviews by the Italian music critics.

Mattia Marzi of Rockol defined the album as the second chapter of Schiena, as "a state of calmness and serenity; [...] It does not tell one story, but many different stories", in which the "electronic music represents only a small segment of the album, and the experimental and research work" with "new shades of her voice".

== Track listing ==
Adesso – Standard track listing
No.	Title	Writer(s)	Producer(s)	Length
1.	"Adesso (ti voglio bene)"	Emma Marrone	Luca Mattioni; Marrone	3:18
2.	"Occhi profondi"	Ermal Meta; Dario Faini	Mattioni; Marrone	3:09
3.	"Quando le canzoni finiranno"	Diego Mancino; Faini	Mattioni; Marrone	3:34
4.	"Facciamola più semplice"	Giuliano Sangiorgi	Mattioni; Marrone	3:41
5.	"Finalmente"	Giovanni Caccamo; Alessandra Flora	Mattioni; Marrone	3:14
6.	"Arriverà l'amore"	Meta; Matteo Buzzanca	Mattioni; Marrone	3:35
7.	"In viaggio"	Carlo Verrienti; Niccolò Verrienti	Mattioni; Marrone	3:17
8.	"Io di te non ho paura"	Sergio Vallarino; Giulia Anania; Marta Venturini	Mattioni; Marrone	3:34
9.	"Per questo paese"	Marrone; Giuseppe Anastasi; Alfredo Rapetti; Erika Mineo	Mattioni; Marrone	3:50
10.	"Argento adesso"	Alessandra Merola	Mattioni; Marrone	3:09
11.	"Il paradiso non esiste"	Marrone; Mancino; Faini	Mattioni; Marrone	3:35
12.	"Che sia tu"	Merola	Mattioni; Marrone	4:33
13.	"Poco prima di dormire"	C. Verrienti; N. Verrienti	Mattioni; Marrone	4:07
Total length:				46:36

Adesso: Tour Edition – Deluxe edition bonus tracks
No.	Title	Writer(s)	Producer(s)	Length
1.	"Nel posto più lontano"	Merola	Mattioni; Marrone	3:48
2.	"You Don't Love Me (No, No, No)"	Dawn Penn; Ellas McDaniel; Willie Cobbs	Mattioni; Marrone
3.	"Libre" (featuring Álvaro Soler)	Álvaro Soler; David Julca; Jonathan Julca; Simon Triebel; Ali Zuckowski	Triebel; Zuckowski	3:53
Total length:				45:57

== Charts ==
Chart performance for Adesso
Chart (2015)	Peak position
Italian Albums (FIMI)	2
Swiss Albums (Schweizer Hitparade)	23

=== Year-end charts ===
Year-end chart performance for "Adesso"
Chart (2015)	Rank
Italy (FIMI)	21
Chart (2016)	Rank
Italy (FIMI)	23

== Certifications ==
Certifications for Adesso
Region	Certification	Certified units/sales
Italy (FIMI)	2× Platinum	100,000^{*}
^{*} Sales figures based on certification alone.
