= Sarò libera =

Studio album by Emma
- Released: 20 September 2011
- Recorded: 2011
- Genres: Pop; rock
- Length: 47:13
- Label: Universal
- Producers: Dado Parisini; Celso Valli

Emma chronology
A me piace così (2010)	Sarò libera (2011)	Schiena (2013)

Singles from Sarò libera
- 1. "Sarò libera" Released: 2 September 2011; 2. "Tra passione e lacrime" Released: 28 October 2011; 3. "Non è l'inferno" Released: 15 February 2012; 4. "Cercavo amore" Released: 27 April 2012; 5. "Maledetto quel giorno" Released: 17 September 2012

Sarò libera is the second studio album by Italian singer Emma, released on 20 September 2011 by Universal Music Group.

The album is preceded by the eponymous single "Sarò libera", released on 2 September 2011 and subsequently certified Gold disc. According to Musica e Dischi, it was the 55th-best-selling single of 2011 in Italy. The album reached the highest position at 43 in Switzerland in the Swiss Music Charts, remaining there for eight weeks, and debuted at number 1 in Italy.

After Emma's participation at the Sanremo Music Festival 2012, a new edition of the album was released in February 2012, called Sanremo Edition, featuring two versions of the winning song "Non è l'inferno" and the cover version of "Nel blu dipinto di blu".

The third official single "Non è l'inferno", certified Platinum, as well as the fourth single, "Cercavo amore".

The fifth and last single from the album was "Maledetto quel giorno", the soundtrack of the campaign Hyundai i20 Sound Edition. The album Sarò libera was certified double platinum by the Federation of the Italian Music Industry.

== Promotion ==
=== Sarò libera Tour ===
From July 10, 2012 Emma Marrone was on tour with the Sarò libera Tour. A single date abroad was in London on 8 in October 2012, at Koko Club. Sarò libera Tour sold more than 160,000 tickets (excluding stages with free admission) and sold out in almost every concert.

== Track listing ==
Sarò libera – Standard track listing
No.	Title	Lyrics	Music	Length
1.	"Tra passione e lacrime"	Giulia Anania; Luca Angelosanti; Francesco Morettini	Anania; Angelosanti; Morettini	3:57
2.	"Sarò libera"	Saverio Grandi; Carlo Rizioli	Grandi; Rizioli	3:25
3.	"Senza averti mai"	Federica Camba; Daniele Coro	Camba; Coro	3:35
4.	"Non sono solo te"	Niccolò Agliardi	Agliardi; Ermanno Facchi; Andrea Torresani	3:36
5.	"Ti capita mai"	Roberto Casalino	Casalino; Massimiliano Greco	3:27
6.	"Dove finisce la notte"	Antonio Galbiati; Dario Faini	Galbiati; Faini	3:24
7.	"Acqua e ghiaccio"	Agliardi	Matteo Bassi	3:54
8.	"Maledetto quel giorno"	Camba; Coro	Camba; Coro	3:44
9.	"Cercavo amore"	Casalino	Casalino; Niccolò Verrienti	3:34
10.	"Da quando mi hai lasciato tu"	Casalino; Carlo Verrienti	Casalino; N. Verrienti	3:32
11.	"Un attimo"	Casalino	Casalino	3:45
12.	"Protagonista"	Faini; Andrea Amati	Faini; Amati	3:38
13.	"Scusa se vado via"	Camba; Coro	Camba; Coro	3:42

Sarò libera: Sanremo Edition – Limited edition bonus tracks
No.	Title	Lyrics	Music	Length
1.	"Non è l'inferno"	Francesco Silvestre	Enrico Palmosi; Luca Sala	3:45
2.	"Nel blu dipinto di blu" (originally performed by Domenico Modugno)	Franco Migliacci	Domenico Modugno; Migliacci	3:44
16.	"Non è l'inferno" (with Alessandra Amoroso)	Silvestre	Palmosi; Sala	3:44

== Charts ==
Chart performance for Sarò libera
Chart (2011)	Peak position
Italian Albums (FIMI)	1
Swiss Albums (Schweizer Hitparade)	43

=== Year-end charts ===
Year-end chart performance for Sarò libera
Chart (2011)	Position
Italian Albums (FIMI)	27
Chart (2012)	Position
Italian Albums (FIMI)	8

== Certifications ==
Certifications for Sarò libera
Region	Certification	Certified units/sales
Italy (FIMI)	3× Platinum	180,000^{*}
^{*} Sales figures based on certification alone.
