= Souvenir (Emma Marrone album) =

2023 studio album by Emma

Studio album by Emma
- Released: 13 October 2023
- Recorded: 2021–2023
- Genre: Pop; R&B
- Length: 28:31
- Label: Universal; Capitol
- Producer: Dibla; Drillionaire; d.whale; Jiz; Juli; Katoo; Kyv; Max Kleinz; Simon Says!; Starchild; Takagi & Ketra; Zef

Emma chronology
Fortuna (2019)	Souvenir (2023)

Singles from Souvenir
- 1. "Mezzo mondo" Released: 28 April 2023; 2. "Taxi sulla Luna" Released: 9 June 2023; 3. "Iniziamo dalla fine" Released: 1 September 2023; 4. "Amore cane" Released: 1 December 2023; 5. "Apnea" Released: 7 February 2024; 6. "Femme fatale" Released: 3 May 2024; 7. "Hangover" Released: 20 September 2024

Souvenir is the seventh studio album by Italian singer-songwriter Emma, released by Universal Music Italy and Capitol Records on 13 October 2023.

The album peaked at number one on Italian Albums Chart, becoming the singer fifth album to achieve it, being certified platinum by FIMI. In 2024 the album was reiussed including the song "Apnea", which competed at the 74th Sanremo Music Festival.

== Composition and conception ==
The album is composed of nine tracks, six of which were written by the singer herself, with the collaboration of songwriters and producers, such as Davide Simonetta, Francesco "Katoo" Catitti, Drillionaire, Federica Abbate, Nesli, Franco126, Andrea Bonomo and Takagi & Ketra. The album also featured two collaboration with Italian rappers Lazza and Tony Effe of Dark Polo Gang.

The album's tracks deal with different personal and social issues, such as the death of her father from leukemia, feminism and the relationship with social networks. The singer told about the meaning of the project:

"Souvenir is all that is left of this long journey. It is the snapshot, still in space and time, of another chapter of my life. It collects the images, the colors, the emotions felt and experienced in these last years. The production of the record brings with it all the acoustic baggage of my better part. It plays with contemporary electronic sounds without distorting what has been built so far. It puts sound research at the service of my new expressive nuances, to create something new while remaining true to myself. 9 stories, 9 songs, 9 pieces of a puzzle representing all my facets. At the end of this whole journey, there remains a great longing for life and revenge. The desire to come out of deep sleep. To break free from a malaise and a state of non-acceptance. Of always looking for the silver lining. This record is just the beginning of something new. It has awakened in me the desire to sing and write many more things, which I will find a way and time to say"

— Emma on Souvenir

In an interview with All Music Italia, Emma told that this is the first chapter of a larger project, in which she hopes "there will be many feats with women in Italian music," also stating that she has written new tracks with Paolo Antonacci and Davide Simonetta.

== Artwork ==
In an interview with Vanity Fair Italia, the singer told about the choice of the album cover, which is associated with feminism and the perception of femininity:

I have always been accused of being unfeminine because I prefer cargo pants to skinny jeans, but that's because women are always bound to a standard ideal. On the cover of Souvenir, on the other hand, there is me with a racing car, an image usually associated with men. Instead it matches me a lot, because I am the one who drives 700 kilometers alone even without stopping

== Critical reception ==
Alessandro Alicandri of TV Sorrisi e Canzoni considered the album among the best of the artist's career and called it "a beautiful pop album," as she "simultaneously reset and then rebuilt her way of making music; [...] presenting herself again." Alicandri wrote that the tracks have "diverse musical natures" with dance-rock, electro-pop and Latin influences. About the two collaborations, the journalist described the one with Lazza as "a hypnotic track that exudes the naturalness of their meeting," while the one with Tony Effe believed that "it comes across almost as a bonus track" although it "poses a curious and open look at new territories. Writing for Corriere della Sera, Andrea Laffranchi defined the project as "autobiographical and full of memories."

Fabio Fiume of All Music Italia affirmed that the singer brings a "small" but "thoughtful and precious" project, in which "a new expressive delicacy" is evident and that "embraces new sounds, renews herself, remains true to herself without appearing static." This fact has happened, according to the journalist, due to the reshaping of the voice, which becomes "a well-rooted presence that has not really gone away." Fiume appreciated the collaboration with Lazza, which "does not sound like a commercial operation but like a sensible exchange between two friends," and Intervallo, a song that "gives authentic emotions" and in which Emma "manages to talk to her recently deceased father without falling [... ] into spectacularizations of grief"; Fiume also stressed that Ogni volta è così "would have deserved its own place in an album." Marco De Crescenzo of Newsic.it pointed out that the singer is "less blustery, less rough and impatient" than previous projects, with a newfound balance "inner, vocal and also musical."

== Commercial performance ==
Souvenir debuted at No. 1 of the Italian Albums Chart, becoming Emma's fifth number one album and the third by a woman to achieve that result in 2023.

== Track listing ==
Souvenir – Standard track listing
No.	Title	Lyrics	Music	Producer(s)	Length
1.	"Iniziamo dalla fine"	Emma Marrone; Paolo Antonacci; Davide Simonetta	Antonacci; Simonetta	d.whale	3:13
2.	"Amore cane" (featuring Lazza)	Marrone; Jacopo Lazzarini; Jacopo Ettorre	Simone Privitera; Lazzarini	Drillionaire; Simon Says!	3:26
3.	"Mezzo mondo"	Marrone; Ettorre; Francesco Tarducci	Tarducci; Francesco Catitti	Katoo; Zef	3:34
4.	"Intervallo"	Marrone; Federica Abbate; Federico Bartollini	Marrone; Abbate; Catitti	Katoo	3:27
5.	"Sentimentale"	Marrone; Ettorre	Privitera	Katoo; Simon Says!	2:56
6.	"Carne viva"	Ettorre	Riccardo Scirè	Drillionaire; Katoo	3:12
7.	"Capelli corti"	Andrea Bonomo; Simonetta	Bonomo; Simonetta	Katoo	3:15
8.	"Indaco"	Marrone; Ettorre; Abbate	Privitera; Abbate	Katoo; Simon Says!	3:07
9.	"Taxi sulla Luna" (with Tony Effe)	Antonacci; Nicolò Rapisarda	Alessandro Merli; Fabio Clemente; Vettraino	Takagi & Ketra	2:23
Total length:					28:33

Souvenir – Sanremo Edition bonus track
No.	Title	Lyrics	Music	Producer(s)	Length
1.	"Apnea"	Marrone; Davide Petrella; Antonacci	Julien Boverod; Petrella; Antonacci	Juli	3:00
Total length:					31:34

Souvenir – Digital reissue bonus track
No.	Title	Lyrics	Music	Producer(s)	Length
1.	"Femme fatale"	Ettorre	Boverod; Simone Capurro; Ettorre	Juli; Starchild	3:10
Total length:					34:44

Souvenir: Extended – Deluxe edition bonus tracks
No.	Title	Lyrics	Music	Producer(s)	Length
1.	"Apnea"	Marrone; Petrella; Antonacci	Boverod; Petrella; Antonacci	Juli	3:00
2.	"Hangover" (featuring Baby Gang)	Marrone; Zaccaria Mouhib; Federico Olivieri	Boverod	Juli	2:50
3.	"Vita lenta"	Marrone; Alessandro La Cava	Luca Di Blasi; Vincenzo Centrella	Kyv; Dibla	2:10
4.	"Pretaporter"	Marrone; Ettorre	Ettorre; Catitti	Katoo	3:23
5.	"French Riviera"	Marrone; Ettorre	Di Blasi; Giorgio De Lauri	Katoo; Jiz; Dibla	3:17
6.	"Lacrime"	Marrone; Francesco D'Agostino	Centrella	Kyv	2:42
7.	"Femme fatale"	Ettorre	Boverod; Capurro; Ettorre	Juli	3:10
8.	"Centomila"	Marrone; La Cava	Marrone; La Cava; Centrella	Katoo	3:07
Total length:					52:10

== Charts ==
=== Weekly charts ===
Chart performance for Souvenir
Chart (2023)	Peak position
Italian Albums (FIMI)	1
Swiss Albums (Schweizer Hitparade)	56

=== Year-end charts ===
2023 year-end chart performance for Souvenir
Chart (2023)	Position
Italy (FIMI)	92

2024 year-end chart performance for Souvenir
Chart (2024)	Position
Italian Albums (FIMI)	27

== Certifications ==
Certifications for Souvenir
Region	Certification	Certified units/sales
Italy (FIMI)	Platinum	50,000^{‡}
^{‡} Sales+streaming figures based on certification alone.
