= Oltre (EP) =

EP by Emma Marrone
- Released: March 16, 2010
- Length: 24:39
- Label: Universal
- Producer: Dado Parisini

Emma Marrone chronology
Oltre (2010)	A me piace cosi (2011)

Singles from Oltre
- 1. "Calore" Released: 16 March 2010; 2. "Un sogno a costo zero" Released: 28 July 2010; 3. "Sembra strano" Released: 17 September 2010

Oltre is the solo debut EP by Italian singer Emma Marrone released by Universal Music on March 16, 2010. The album topped the charts in Italy, and was the second-best-selling album in Italy in 2010. It was subsequently certified double platinum. The lead single on the album, "Calore", was also certified platinum. The album ranked number 85 on the Swiss charts.

The EP was named and designed after a tattoo that Emma has on the back of her neck. The same design is visible on the disc and in the digital booklet.

== Track listing ==
All tracks are written by Federica Camba and Daniele Coro, except where noted.

No.	Title	Length
1.	"Sembra strano"	3:36
2.	"L'esigenza di te"	3:28
3.	"Calore" (Roberto Angelini)	3:24
4.	"Meravigliosa" (Antonio Galbiati, Fortunato Zampaglione)	3:39
5.	"Un sogno a costo zero"	3:11
6.	"Davvero"	3:48
7.	"Folle paradiso"	3:33

== Charts ==
Chart	Peak position
Italian Albums (FIMI)	1
Swiss Albums (Schweizer Hitparade)	85

== Ahi ce sta passu Tour ==
Ahi ce sta passu Tour
- Tour by Emma Marrone
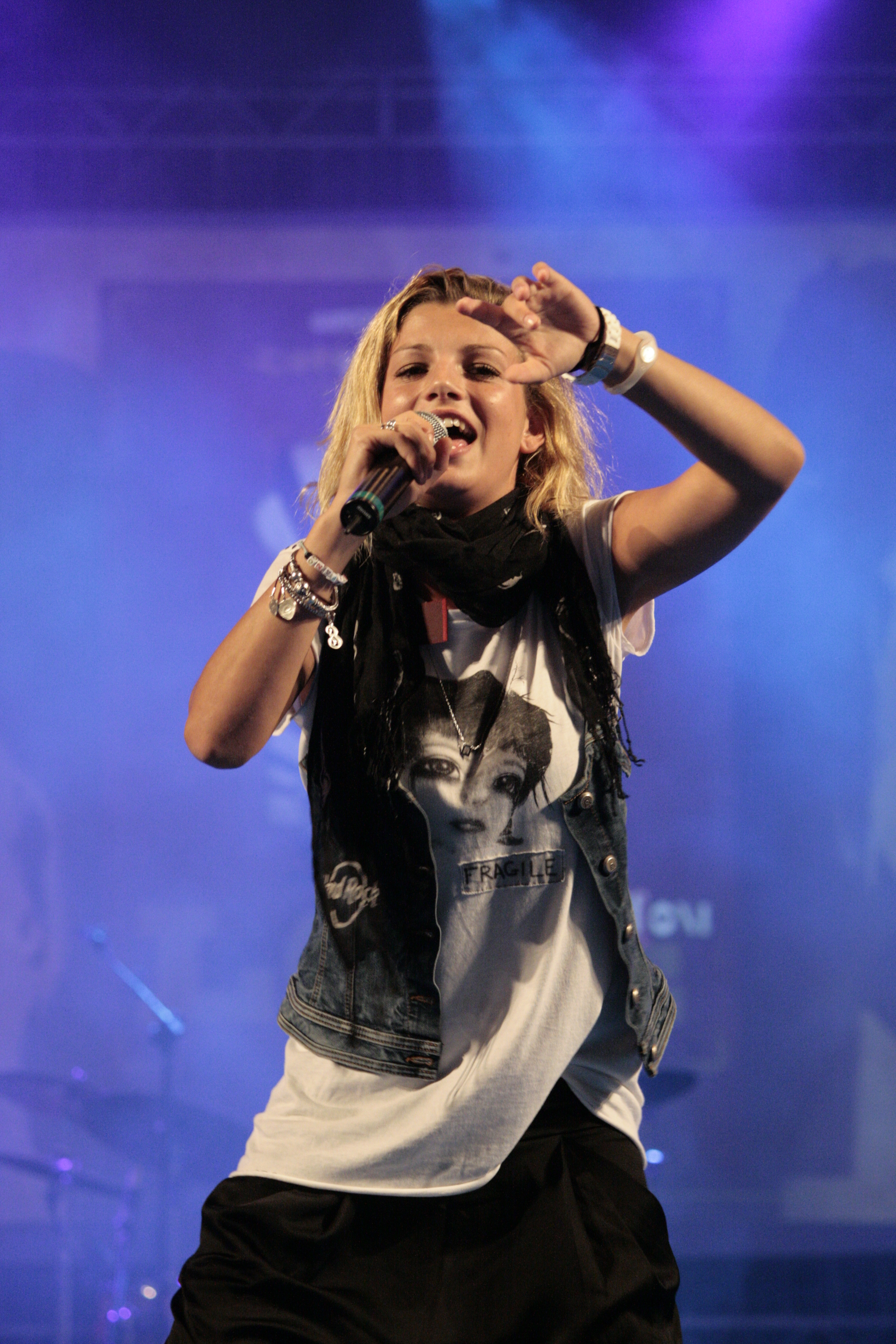
- Emma in concert in 2010 at Giffoni Film Festival
- Location: Italy
- Associated album: Oltre
- Start date: June 25, 2010
- End date: September 18, 2010
- No. of shows: 16

Emma Marrone concert chronology
- Ahi ce sta passu Tour (2010); A me piace così Tour (2011)

Beginning June 25, 2010, Marrone embarked on the Ahi ce sta passu Tour, stopping in the following cities.

=== Date ===
1. June 25: Cremona (CR) - Arena Giardino
2. July 10: Viareggio (LU) - Cittadella del Carnevale
3. July 18: Villafranca di Verona (VR) - Castello Scaligero
4. July 20: Alessandria (AL) - La cittadella
5. July 24: Udine (UD) - Castello
6. July 28: Giffoni Valle Piana (SA) - Arena Alberto Sordi - La cittadella del Cinema dei Giffoni Film Festival
7. July 30: Piazzola sul Brenta (PD) - Anfiteatro Camerini
8. August 9: Grosseto (GR) - Parco di Pietra
9. August 10: Cattolica (RN) - Arena della Regina
10. August 15: Bagnara Calabra (RC) - Piazza Municipio
11. August 17: Lecce (LE) - Piazza Libertini
12. August 21: Pescara (PE) - Teatro d'Annunzio
13. August 27: Ostuni (BR) - Piazza Libertà
14. September 6: Viterbo (VT) - Arena Valle Faul
15. September 10: Milan (MI) - Palasharp
16. September 18: Rome (RM) - Atlantico (ex Palacisalfa)

=== Set list ===
1. "Davvero"
2. "Quello che" (cover 99 Posse)
3. "Sembra strano"
4. "E la luna bussò" (cover Loredana Bertè)
5. "Oro Nero" (cover Otto Ohm)
6. "Meravigliosa"
7. "Ma che freddo fà" (cover Nada)
8. "Folle Paradiso"
9. "Valerie" (cover Amy Winehouse)
10. "America" (cover Gianna Nannini)
11. "If I Ain't Got You" (cover Alicia Keys)
12. "L'esigenza di te"
13. "E penso a te" (cover Lucio Battisti)
14. "Grande grande grande" (cover Mina)
15. "Un sogno a costo zero"
16. "Walk on the Wild Side" (cover Lou Reed)
17. "Personal Jesus" (cover Depeche Mode)
18. "Calore"

=== Personnel ===
- Flavio Pasquetto – Electric guitars and acoustic guitars
- Simone De Filippis – Electric guitars and acoustic guitars
- Luca Cirillo – Keyboard
- Daniele Formica – Drums
- Pietro Casadei – Electric bass
