= Arriverà =

Single by Modà and Emma

from the album Viva i romantici and A me piace così
- Language: Italian
- Released: 16 February 2011
- Recorded: 2010
- Genre: Pop rock
- Length: 3:03
- Label: Ultrasuoni
- Songwriter: Francesco Silvestre
- Producers: Francesco Silvestre; Enrico Zapparoli; Enrico Palmosi

Modà singles chronology
| "La notte" (2010) | "Arriverà" (2011) | "Vittima" (2011) |

Emma singles chronology
| "Cullami" (2010) | "Arriverà" (2011) | "Io son per te l'amore" (2011) |

Music video
- "Arriverà" on YouTube

"Arriverà" ("It Will Come") is a song recorded by Italian pop rock group Modà and Italian singer Emma. It was released on 16 February 2011 through Ultrasuoni Records as the third single from the band's fourth studio album Viva i romantici. The song was also included in the reissue of Emma's debut studio album A me piace così.

The song competed during the Sanremo Music Festival 2011, finishing at second place in the final rank.

Commercially it peaked the Italian singles chart for five consecutive weeks, becoming Modà's first and Emma's second number one song. The song was certified double platinum by Federazione Industria Musicale Italiana.

== At Sanremo ==
The song took part in the 61st edition of the Sanremo Festival, appearing from the outset, among the favorites for the victory. In the fourth evening the piece is presented as a duet with the singer Francesco Renga, who said:

"Sono molto felice di duettare con i Modà ed Emma: sono artisti che stimo e la canzone mi è piaciuta subito al primo ascolto. Spero di essere un portafortuna per la finale."

"I am very happy to duet with Modà and Emma: they are artists that I respect and I immediately liked the song when I first heard it. I hope to be a lucky charm for the final."

The song came in second place behind Chiamami Ancora Amore by Roberto Vecchioni. During the Festival the orchestration of the piece was directed by Adriano Pennino. As defined by Modà's frontman Kekko Silvestre, the song is "a conversation between a girl in difficulty and a friend of hers." On the piece, Emma declared:

"È favoloso, e nel suo essere rock misto all'eleganza del pop mi rappresenta in pieno."

"It's fabulous, and in its being rock mixed with the elegance of pop it fully represents me."

Subsequently, the single was included in various compilations, including Sanremo 2011, Wind Music Awards 2011, Radio Italia. 30 years of singles ranked first and Je t'aime 2012.

== Controversy ==
After the conclusion of the Sanremo Festival the label Ultrasuoni, a record company founded by RTL 102.5, RDS and Radio Italia, which has Modà as signed artist, has accused Radio RAI of boycotting the single, not including it in their playlists. The director of Radio Rai defended himself against the accusations, declaring:

"Modà? We appreciate them, but their product is not in line with the sound and the musical choices of our radio regarding the so-called playlist."

In the same period, the AGCM, the agency of free competition and the market, released a statement, after some record companies have denounced the exaggerated overexposure of the Modà on the three radio networks. Accused of conflict of interests, as producers of the band, and to give less visibility to other artists.

In many of the critics and journalists, they noticed a particular resemblance to the 1966 song Riderà by the San Marinese singer Little Tony, so much so that Modà were repeatedly accused of plagiarism.

== Commercial success ==
The song reached number one on the Top Singles for five weeks [15] and has been certified multiplatinum for over 60,000 digital sales. In the annual standings of the end of the year, also compiled by FIMI, it appears to be the 7th most downloaded song in Italy in 2011.

== Music video ==
The music video, directed by Gaetano Morbioli, was made available immediately at the end of the first evening, on February 15, 2011. The video, shot at the Teatro alle Vigne di Lodi and sees the participation of actors Davide Silvestri and Valentina Bellè.

Of the video, as well as of the single, there are two versions: one as a duet with Emma and one in which only Modà appear.

== Track ==
Lyrics by Francesco Silvestre, composed by Francesco Silvestre, Enrico Zapparoli, Enrico Palmosi.

1. Arriverà (feat Emma) - 3:33

== Charts ==
=== Weekly charts ===
Weekly chart performance for "Arriverà"
| Chart (2011) | Peak |
|---|---|
| Italy (FIMI) | 1 |

=== Year-end charts ===
Annual chart rankings for "Arriverà"
| Chart (2011) | Rank |
|---|---|
| Italy (Musica e dischi) | 17 |

| Chart (2015) | Rank |
|---|---|
| Italy (FIMI) | 81 |

== Certifications ==
Certifications for "Arriverà"
| Region | Certification | Certified units/sales |
|---|---|---|
| Italy (FIMI) | 2× Platinum | 60,000^{*} |
^{*} Sales figures based on certification alone.
