= Antonino (singer) =

Italian singer (born 1983)

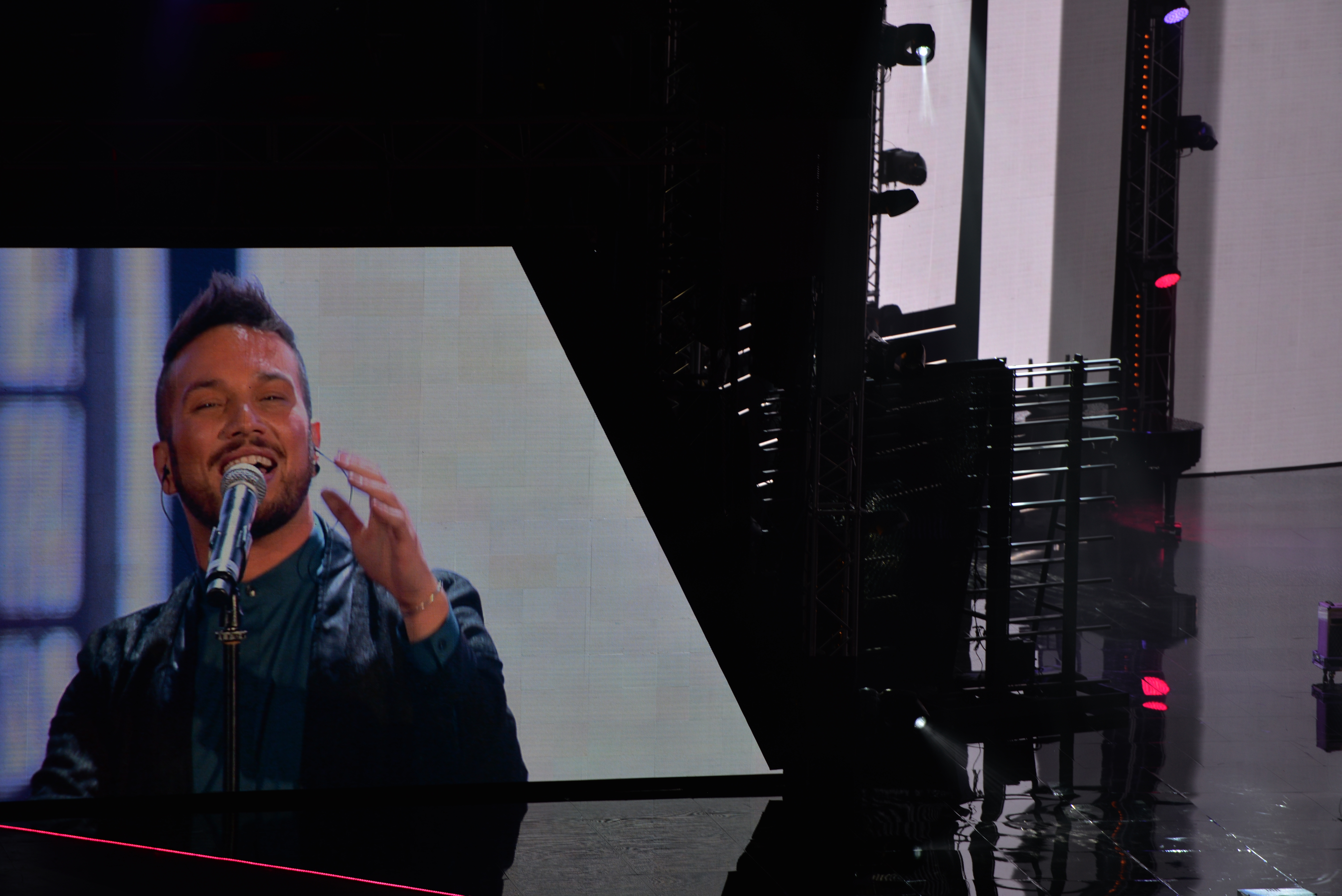
- Antonino @ Wind Music Awards 2016

Background information
- Born: Antonio Spadaccino; 9 March 1983 (age 43); Foggia, Apulia, Italy
- Genres: Pop
- Occupation: Singer
- Instrument: Vocals
- Years active: 2000–present
- Labels: Sony Music (2005-2008, 2020–present); Non ho l'età (2011-2013); Universal (2015-2020)

Antonio Spadaccino (born 9 March 1983), better known as Antonino, is an Italian singer.

== Life and career ==
In 2005 he won the fourth edition of the Italian talent show Amici di Maria De Filippi. His debut album Antonino sold over 30.000 copies and his first single Ce la farò reached the third position in Italy and was certified gold. In 2011 he won the Amici's competition Io ci sono and he got a record deal with Mara Maionchi's label Non ho l'età. With Non Ho L'età records he released two albums: Costellazioni in 2011 and Libera quest'anima in 2012. In 2022, he won Tale e quale show on Rai 1, the Italian adaptation of Your Face Sounds Familiar.

== Discography ==
=== Studio albums ===
- 2006 – Antonino
- 2008 – Nero indelebile
- 2012 – Libera quest'anima

=== EPs ===
- 2011 – Costellazioni

=== Singles ===
- 2005 – Ce la farò
- 2006 – Un ultimo brivido
- 2006 – Nel mio segreto profondo
- 2007 – Resta come sei
- 2007 – Nero indelebile
- 2007 – Freedom
- 2011 – Amore surreale
- 2011 – Costellazioni
- 2011 – Chi sono
- 2012 – Ritornerà
- 2012 - Resta ancora un po'
