= Non è l'inferno =

Single by Emma

from the album Sarò libera (Sanremo Edition)
- Released: 15 February 2012
- Genre: Pop rock
- Length: 3:48
- Label: UMG
- Songwriters: Francesco Silvestre; Luca Sala; Enrico Palmosi
- Producer: Enrico Palmosi

Emma singles chronology
| "Tra passione e lacrime" (2011) | "Non è l'inferno" (2012) | "Cercavo amore" (2012) |

Music video
- "Non è l'inferno" on YouTube

"Non è l'inferno" (English: This isn't hell) is a song recorded by Italian singer Emma. It was released on 15 February 2012 by Universal Music Group and later added in the Sanremo Edition of her second studio album Sarò libera.

The song was written by Modà's frontman Francesco Silvestre with co-writing contribution by Luca Sala and Enrico Palmosi, and produced by the latter.

The song served as Emma's entry at Sanremo Music Festival 2012, winning the competition at the final night rank.

== Critics reception ==
Marinella Venegon of La Stampa described the song as "a philological project" with musical references to "the Motown world and echoes in Mina's art of the early 1960s." Andrea Scanzi of Il Fatto Quotidiano wrote that the singer presents a "boisterous voice" on a song with "stanzas steeped in 'committed' rhetoric" finding it a pretext to "perpetually prove to the world that 'she's not just De Filippi's."

Veronica Valli of Fanpage.it appreciated the duet version with Alessandra Amoroso presented during the Festival, writing that "the double voice absolutely benefits the interpretation of this song, which turns out to be really beautiful. Very good both of them, they interpenetrate great."

== Music video ==
The music video for the song, directed by Marco Salom, was released on February 15, 2012, through the singer's YouTube channel.

== Charts ==
| Chart (2014) | Peak position |
|---|---|
| Italy | 1 |
| Switzerland | 19 |

=== Year-end charts ===
Year-end chart performance for "Non è l'inferno"
| Chart (2012) | Rank |
|---|---|
| Italy (FIMI) | 19 |

== Certifications ==
Certifications for "Mezzo mondo"
| Region | Certification | Certified units/sales |
|---|---|---|
| Italy (FIMI) | 2× Platinum | 60,000^{*} |
^{*} Sales figures based on certification alone.

== Adaptations ==
The song was adapted in Greek as "Ποιος είμαι εγώ" (Who am I) by award-winning Cypriot singer Michalis Hatzigiannis in his 2013 album Η αγάπη δυναμώνει (Love makes you strong).
