= Emma Marrone =

Italian singer-songwriter and actress (born 1984)

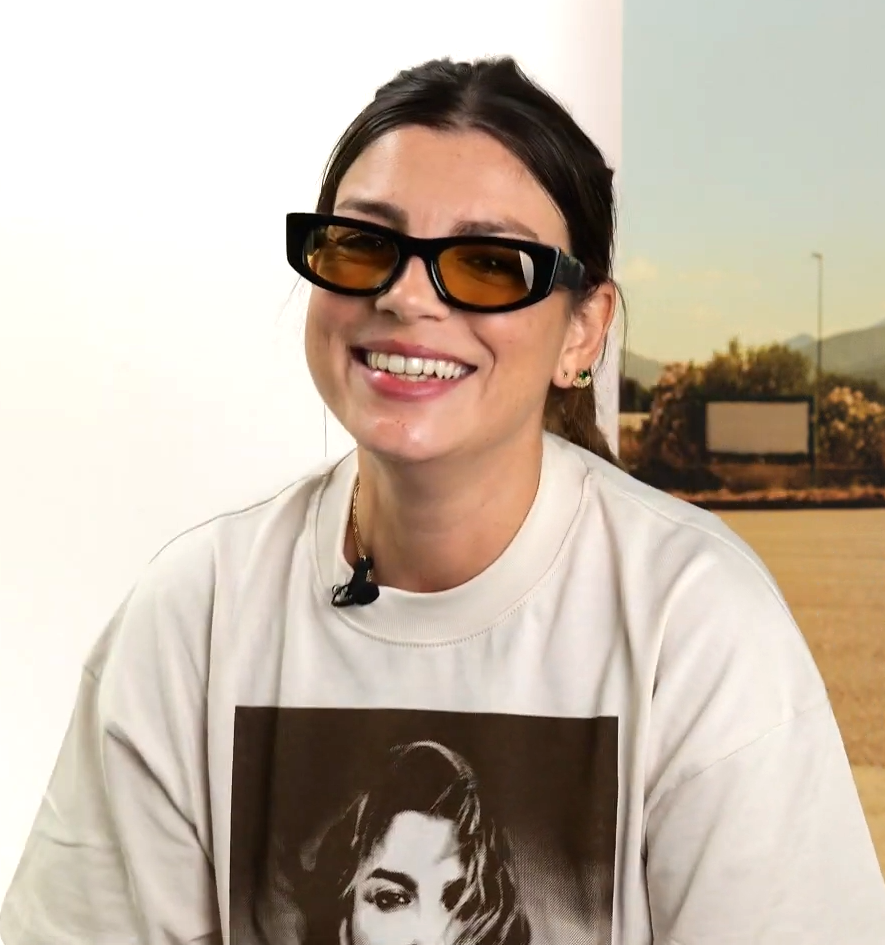
- Emma in October 2023

Background information
- Also known as: Emma Marrone
- Born: Emmanuela Marrone; 25 May 1984 (age 42); Florence, Tuscany, Italy
- Origin: Aradeo, Apulia, Italy
- Genres: Pop; pop rock
- Occupations: Singer; songwriter; actress
- Instruments: Vocals; acoustic guitar; classical guitar
- Years active: 2003–present
- Labels: Universal; Polydor; Capitol; Island
- Website: emmamarrone.net

Emmanuela "Emma" Marrone (Italian: [ˈɛmma marˈroːne]; born 25 May 1984), often known mononymously as Emma, is an Italian singer, songwriter and actress.

After working with several bands, she gained recognition after winning the ninth edition of the Italian reality competition Amici di Maria De Filippi in March 2010, and signed with record label Universal Music. Since 2010, she has released 7 solo studio albums, 1 extended play and over fifty singles, topping the Italian Singles Chart and the Italian Albums Chart four times and selling more than 2 million records in Italy.

In February 2012, she won the Sanremo Music Festival 2012 with the song "Non è l'inferno". She also represented Italy during the Eurovision Song Contest 2014 with the song "La mia città", finishing in 21st place at the end of the competition.

She collaborated with International artists like Thirty Seconds to Mars and Álvaro Soler, and Italian singers Elisa, Alessandra Amoroso, Modà, Fabrizio Moro, Vasco Rossi, Giuliano Sangiorgi and Roberto Casalino. Marrone figured also as a songwriter and producer for other artists such as Elodie and Antonino.

In 2013, 2015, and 2016 Marrone served as a coach for the white team during the final stage of Amici di Maria De Filippi, which gave her two Italian Television Direction Awards. She also ventured into acting starring in Gabriele Muccino's film The Best Years (2020) and Stefano Chiantini's film Il ritorno (2022).

She received several Italian and International awards and nominations including three MTV Italian Music Awards, one TRL Awards and was nominated at the MTV Europe Music Award and the World Music Awards.

== Biography ==
=== 1984–2002: Early life and musical beginnings ===
Emmanuela Marrone was born in Florence to Rosario and Maria Marrone, originally from Aradeo in the province of Lecce, Southern Italy. After spending her early childhood in Sesto Fiorentino, at the age of 4 she moved with her family to Aradeo. She acquired her passion for music from her father, who was a guitarist in a band from Aradeo called "Karadreon" (formed when Marrone was about 10 years old) and in a band called "H2O". She graduated from classical high school, writing a thesis on music. She worked in a warehouse and was a saleswoman for three years.

=== 2003–2009: TV experience on Superstar Tour and performing with Lucky Star, Mjur and Anonimo Soul ===
Marrone started her professional musical career in 2003, when she took part in the second Italian edition of Popstars (later renamed Superstar Tour); she won the talent show, and along with Laura Pisu and Colomba Pane formed Lucky Star. The group released a successful single in 2003 called "Stile", on the Universal label. In 2006 the group recorded the soundtrack of the cartoon W.I.T.C.H. and released a dance-pop album, called LS3. The band then broke up.

In 2007, she formed another alternative rock group, M.J.U.R. (which stands for "Mad Jesters Until Rave"). The group won a contract with Dracma Records, recorded an album between August and September 2007, and released the album Mjur in January 2008, with ten tracks written and composed by its members.

Between 2007 and 2009, she was in the band Anonimo Soul with her uncle Emidio Marrone, performing soul and funk. Until 2009 she also played with H2O, a band in which her father Rosario Marrone was a member.

=== 2009–2010: Amici, first solo record Oltre and rise to success ===
In 2009, she took part in another talent show for Canale 5, Amici di Maria De Filippi, and won this competition.

In March 2010, through Universal Music she released her first EP, Oltre, which was very successful in Italy, peaking at number one for two weeks on the Italian Albums Chart. In the same month, her first single was released, "Calore", which peaked at number one for two weeks and was certified platinum.

The EP was certified triple platinum for its sales in Italy and was the second best-selling album of 2010 in Italy. In Switzerland it peaked at number 85.

On 28 May 2010, she took part in the Wind Music Awards, and was awarded the prize for the multiplatinum CD EP Oltre by her idol Gianna Nannini.

In June 2010, she began her first summer-long tour: the Ahi ce sta passu tour. She toured throughout Italy with her band. In the same month, she also took part in the Amici Tour 2010 with all the contestants of the talent show. In July 2010, the second single from Oltre was released: "Un sogno a costo zero". After the tour, she released the video for the third single "Sembra strano".

In the summer of 2010, Marrone received the award for Best Female Vocalist of the Year 2010 at the Venice Music Awards.

=== 2010–2011: A me piace così, and second place in the Sanremo Music Festival 2011 ===
On 24 September 2010, a new single called "Con le nuvole" was released. On 19 October her second solo record was released, also through Universal, A me piace così, which debuted at number 2 on the Italian singles chart, while in Switzerland peaked at number 50. On 19 November 2010, the second single from the album, "Cullami", was released.

On 30 November 2010, a special edition of the album was released which included both the albums Oltre and A me piace così, with two new songs: "L'Amore Che Ho" (written by Neffa) and "(Sittin' On) The Dock of the Bay" (duet with Craig David). In February 2011, she was nominated for the TRL Awards 2011 in the category Best Talent Show Artist.

Marrone participated in the Sanremo Music Festival 2011 with the group Modà with the song "Arriverà", finishing in second place, behind Roberto Vecchioni. The track "Arriverà" debuted at the top of the Italian singles chart. In conjunction with her participation, the Sanremo Edition of the album was released. It featured a new cover, "Arriverà" and two new songs, "Io son per te l'amore" and "Per sempre". On 15 March 2011, Marrone opened the only Italian date of Taylor Swift's tour. On 15 April 2011, the song "Io son per te l'amore" was released as a single. On 29 May 2011, she opened the final of the Italian Cup 2010–2011 at the Stadio Olimpico in Rome, singing the Italian national anthem.

In summer 2011, Emma embarked on her second tour, A me piace cosi Tour 2011. In the same period she opened two concerts for Vasco Rossi and three concerts for Gianna Nannini. Also in the summer of 2011, she was awarded the Wind Music Awards 2011 for sales of A me piace cosi and sales of the digital single in collaboration with Modà, "Arriverà". In July 2011 Marrone participated in a festival dedicated to Italian singer Giorgio Gaber, singing two songs, "Io non-mi sento italiano" and "La libertà".

In September 2011, the album A me piace cosi was certified double platinum, while "Arriverà" went multiplatinum.

=== 2011–2012: Sarò libera and victory at the Sanremo Music Festival 2012 ===
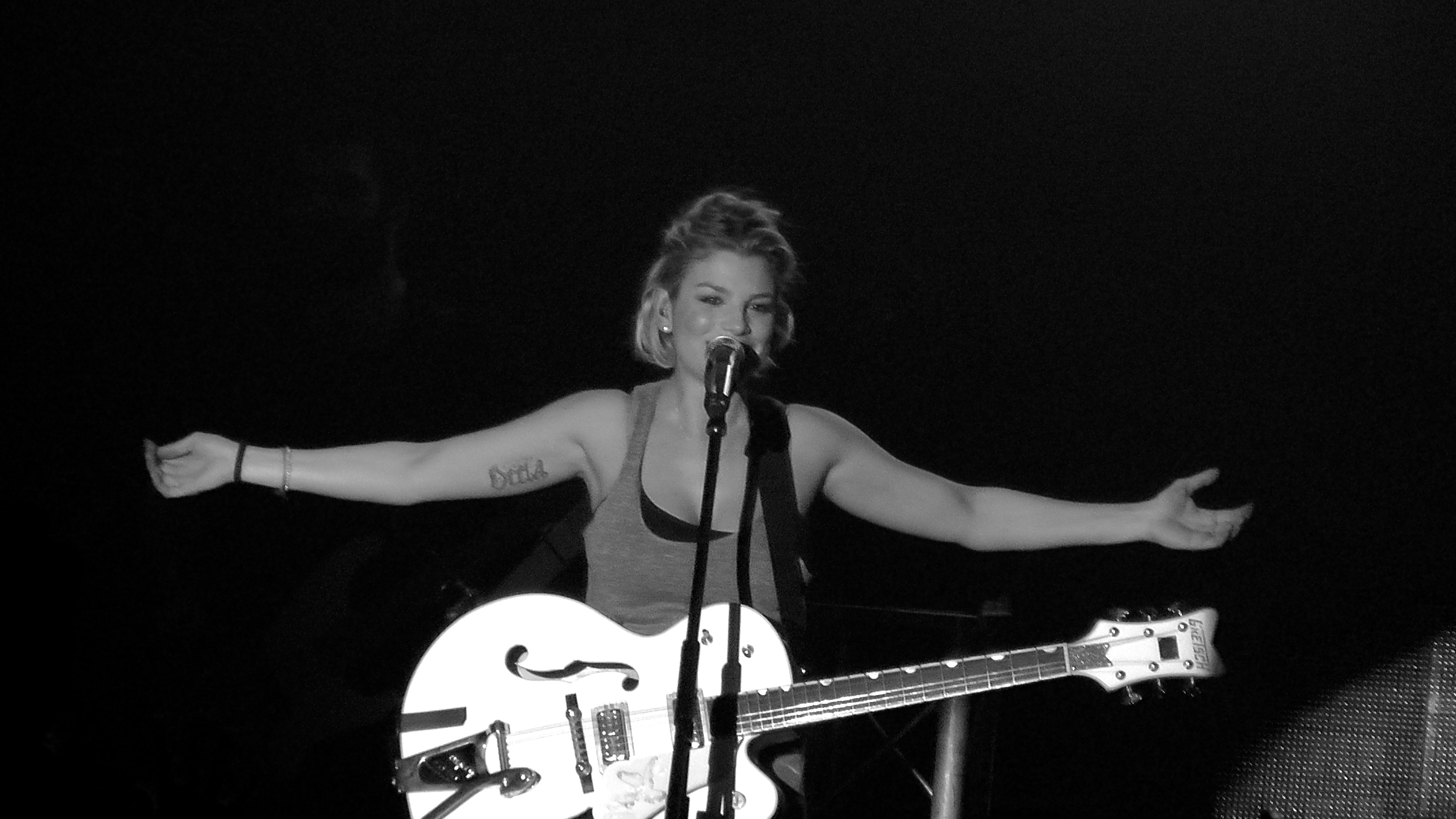
Marrone in concert in Florence in 2012 with her guitar, Gretsch White Falcon

On 20 September 2011, Emma released her third solo studio album, Sarò libera, preceded by the single of the same name, which was released on 2 September 2011. The song has been certified gold in Italy, while the album debuted atop the Italian album chart, and was officially certified triple platinum. On 28 October 2011, the second single, "Tra Passione e lacrime", was released. In January 2012, Marrone made a cameo in the final scene and credits of Benvenuti al Nord, singing "Nel blu dipinto di blu".

On 15 January 2012, she announced her participation in the Sanremo Music Festival 2012 with the song "Non è l'inferno", releasing Sarò libera (Sanremo Edition). On the third night of the festival, Marrone sang a cover of Amen Corner's "(If Paradise Is) Half as Nice" with Gary Go. On the fourth evening, she performed her single "Non è l'inferno" with Alessandra Amoroso. On 19 February 2012, she was proclaimed the winner of the 62nd Sanremo Music Festival. The song "Non è l'inferno" went straight to number one in the Italian singles chart, and was then certified double platinum. In Switzerland, the single peaked at number 19, remaining on the chart for three consecutive weeks. Despite this success, the album Sarò Libera only reached number 43 on the Swiss album chart.

In February 2012, Marrone was nominated for a Kids' Choice Award 2012 in the category of Best Italian singer. On 31 March 2012, Marrone returned to the talent show Amici di Maria De Filippi, competing in the category "BIG", which was won by Alessandra Amoroso. Amoroso announced her intention to split the prize, consisting of a free concert at Arena di Verona which was subsequently held on 5 September 2012, with Marrone. During the show, Antonino performed the song "Resta ancora un po'", written by Emma. It was released on 7 May 2012 as the second single from his album Libera quest'anima. The song peaked at number 6 on the Italian singles chart.

At the TRL Awards 2012, Emma received nominations in the categories Best Fan and Italians Do It Better, winning the latter.

On 27 April 2012, Emma released "Cercavo amore", the fourth single from her album Sarò libera. The single remained at the top of the Italian singles chart for two weeks and was certified platinum. In Switzerland, it debuted at number 68. On 10 July 2012, the official remix of "Cercavo amore" by Alex Gaudino and Jason Rooney was released. "Cercavo amore" was the only Italian song included in Just Dance 4. On 2 July 2012, Marrone performed "Cercavo amore" at the Wind Music Awards 2012. Marrone also sang a duet with Pino Daniele to the tune of "Io per lei" and "Quando".

In the month of July she began her third tour, called Sarò libera. It sold more than 160,000 tickets, excluding venues with free admission, selling out almost every concert. On 17 September 2012 the fifth single from Sarò libera was released, "Maledetto quel giorno".

On 8 October 2012, Marrone performed in concert for Puglia Sounds at the Koko Club in London, promoting music from the region of Apulia. On 6 November 2012, the track list of the triple disc Per Gaber... io ci sono, a tribute to Giorgio Gaber, was announced, with Marrone singing the song "Freedom". On 11 November 2012, a preview of the music video for the song "Non sono solo te", of which Marrone was both producer and screenwriter, was released on the site of Corriere della Sera.

=== 2013–2014: Schiena, Eurovision Song Contest 2014 and E Live ===
Emma Marrone introducing herself and La Mia Cittá at the Eurovision Song Contest 2014

In February 2013, for the second consecutive year, Marrone received a nomination for the Kids' Choice Award 2013 in the category of Best Italian Singer. On 15 February, on the fourth evening of Sanremo Music Festival 2013, dedicated to Sanremo Story, Marrone performed the song "Per Elisa" by Alice, as a duet with Annalisa. On 16 February, Marrone was chosen as artistic director of a team of Amici di Maria De Filippi, competing against Miguel Bosé's team.

On 9 April 2013, Emma released her third solo studio album, Schiena, through Universal Music. It reached number one on the Italian album chart, and was certified triple platinum.

On 21 January 2014, it was announced by RAI that Marrone would represent Italy in the Eurovision Song Contest 2014 in Copenhagen, Denmark, with the song "La mia città". In the final, Marrone placed 21st with 33 points.

On 11 November 2014, Emma released her first live album E Live. It included 15 songs performed live at the Arena di Verona, as well as the studio version of "Resta ancora un po'", which was released as the album's lead single on 6 October 2014. The song was written by Marrone, but had originally been released as a single by Antonino in 2012.

=== 2015–2018: Adesso, Essere qui and television ===
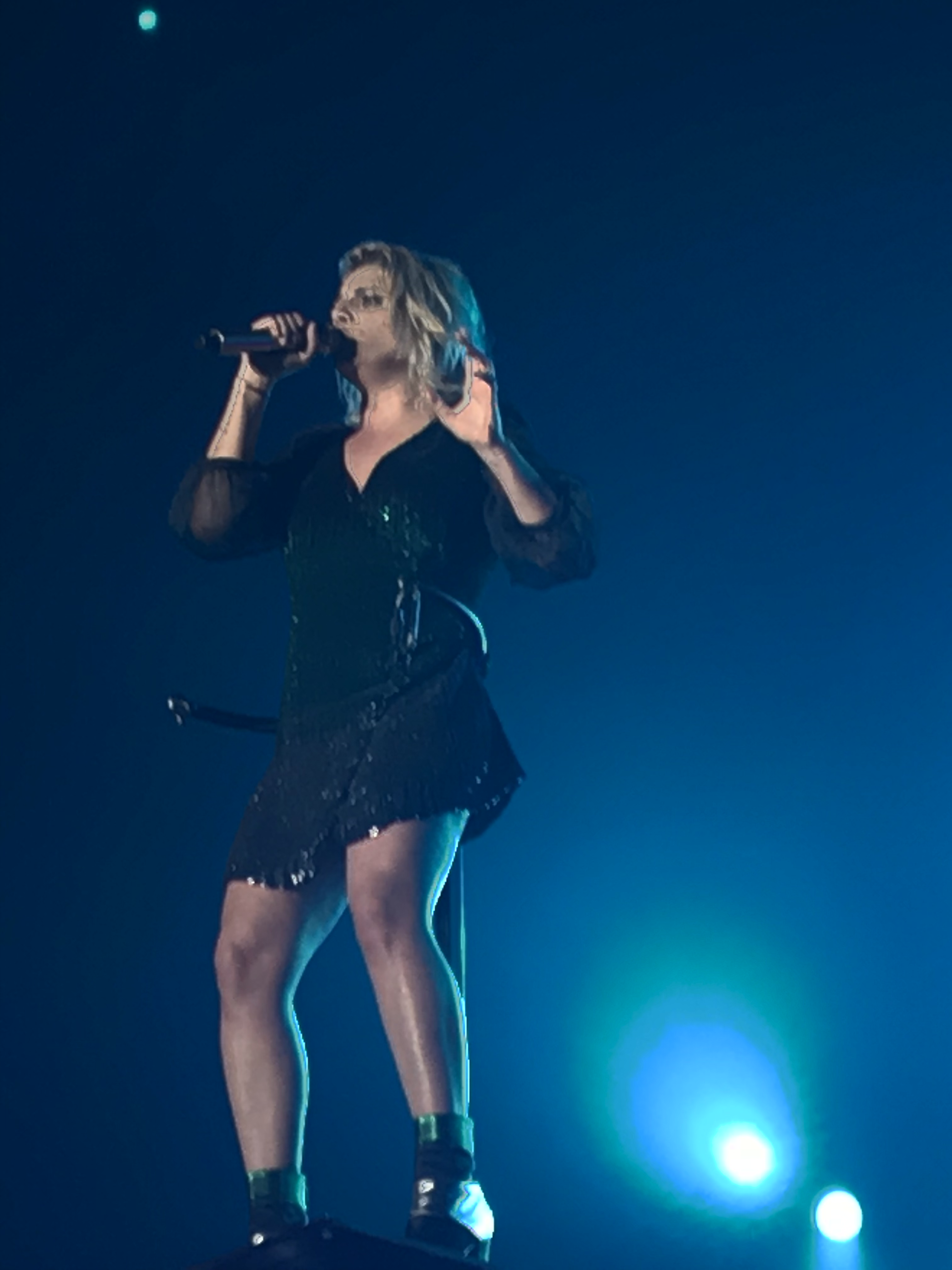
Emma Marrone on Essere Qui Tour.

Between 10–14 February 2015, Marrone co-hosted the 65th edition of the Sanremo Music Festival alongside Carlo Conti and Arisa. On 19 June 2015, Marrone released the song "Occhi profondi" as the lead single from her fourth solo studio album, Adesso. The song peaked at number 13 in Italy and was certified double platinum for sales exceeding 100,000 copies. Adesso was released on 27 November 2015, and was also preceded by the single "Arriverà l'amore", which was released on 23 October 2015. The song debuted and peaked at number 5 on the Italian singles chart, becoming the album's highest-peaking single. The album peaked at number 2 in Italy, becoming her first since A me piace così not to top the chart. In 2016, "Io di te non-ho paura", "Il paradiso non-esiste" and "Quando le canzoni finiranno" were released as singles.

On 9 September 2016, Emma was featured on Álvaro Soler's single "Libre" from the Italian edition of his album Eterno agosto. A music video for the song was released on 12 September 2016. The song was included on the tour edition of Adesso, which was released on 15 November 2015. Along with "Libre", the reissue included a cover of Dawn Penn's "You Don't Love Me (No, No, No)", the unreleased original song "Nel posto più lontano" and a disc recorded live in Milan.

On 5 January 2018, Marrone released "L'isola" as the lead single from her fifth solo studio album, Essere qui. A music video for the song was filmed in New York, directed by Lukasz Pruchnik and released on the same day. The song debuted and peaked at number 7 on the Italian singles chart. It spent two weeks on the chart. Essere qui was released on 26 January 2018. It peaked at number 2 on the Italian albums chart. "Effetto domino" was released as the album's second single on 2 March 2018. The song's music video was directed by Paolo Stella and Alex Grazioli and uploaded to Emma's official YouTube channel on the same day. "Mi parli piano" was released as the album's third single on 4 May 2018. On the following day, a music video for the song, directed by Paolo Stella, was uploaded to Emma's official YouTube channel. The song spent 11 weeks on the Italian singles chart, peaking at number 46, becoming the album's longest charting single. It was certified gold in Italy, for sales exceeding 25,000 copies.

On 16 November 2018, the album was reissued with four new tracks as Essere qui (Boom Edition). On the week of release, the album re-entered the Italian albums chart at number 3. The reissue was preceded by the single "Mondiale" on 2 November 2016. The song spent 3 weeks on the Italian singles chart, peaking at number 7. A music video for the song was uploaded to Emma's official YouTube channel on 5 November 2018. In February 2019, Emma embarked on the Essere qui tour in promotion of the album.

=== 2019–2020: Fortuna, X-Factor Italia and acting debut ===
Following the end of the Essere qui tour in March 2019, Emma travelled to Los Angeles to begin work on her next album. Describing the process, she said "I took my time, I experienced abroad and I opened my mind in a metropolis that is not your home", adding that this helped her understand who she is and what she wanted to do. On 6 September 2019, Emma released "Io sono bella" as the lead single from her sixth solo studio album Fortuna. The song was written by Vasco Rossi, Gaetano Curreri, Gerardo Pulli and Piero Romitelli and produced by Dardust. It was recorded at Speakeasy Studio in Los Angeles. An accompanying music video for the song was directed by Paolo Mannarino and uploaded to Emma's official YouTube channel on 9 September 2019. The song debuted and peaked at number 33 on the Italian singles chart. In October 2019, the song reached the top of the Italian airplay chart. Despite its success on radio and sales, the underperformance of "Io sono bella" on streaming services limited its chart performance, provoking a Twitter campaign in November 2019, with fans criticising Spotify for excluding the song from the platform's biggest playlists.

On 20 September 2019, Emma announced that she would be taking a break for health reasons, cancelling a concert set to take place in Malta on 4 October. In her announcement on social media, she apologised to fans and promised to return stronger than she had been before. On 28 September, she said that she had left hospital, but needed further time to recover.

On 16 October 2019, Emma announced that her sixth solo studio album Fortuna would be released on 25 October 2019, via a video on her social media accounts. In addition to the album's title and release date, Emma revealed the cover and announced a concert on 25 May 2020, her birthday, at the Arena di Verona, to celebrate Fortuna and ten years of her solo music career. Of the album cover, Emma said that she wanted a cover that fit with the album's sound and lyrics, and that "it shows a woman who can be anything she wants, the important thing is what you can't see". On 17 October, Emma revealed the album's track listing, which features 14 songs. Fortuna was made available to pre-order on iTunes the following day. Following its release on 25 October, Fortuna debuted atop the Italian album chart, becoming her first album to top the chart since 2013's Schiena. In an interview, Emma said that Fortuna represented who she is now: a serene, continuously changing person projected towards the future. Positivity is a major theme of the album, with the title track focusing on viewing things positively and the importance of trying, whether you succeed or not. The album calls upon a variety of musical influences, with an array of producers including Dario Faini, Luca Mattoni, Elisa Toffoli, Andrea Rigonat and Frenetik & Orang3. In January 2020, Fortuna was certified gold in Italy, for sales exceeding 25,000 copies.

On 6 December 2019, "Stupida allegria" was released as the second single from Fortuna. An accompanying music video was filmed in Morocco on 2 December and released on 19 December 2019. A remix of "Stupida allegria", featuring Izi, was released on 10 January 2020, peaking at number 42 in Italy. On 4 February 2020, Emma was a guest at the first night of the Sanremo Music Festival 2020, performing "Stupida allegria" and a medley of "Non è l'inferno", "Arriverà", "Amami" and "Fortuna". In February 2020, Emma appeared in the film Gli anni più belli, directed by Gabriele Muccino. Emma said that she was excited to appear in the film, as she wanted "to live all the opportunities in life to the fullest". On 28 February 2020, Emma was a guest on Amici di Maria De Filippi, performing "Stupida allegria" and "Luci blu", the latter of which was announced as the next single. On 6 March 2020, "Luci blu" was released as the third single from Fortuna. The song describes the death of a partner and the resulting guilt, with the titular blue lights being those of an ambulance arriving at the scene of an accident.

In June 2020, she was confirmed to be a judge on X Factor Italy alongside Hell Raton, Mika, and Manuel Agnelli. In August 2020 was published the single Latina, the last extract from his sixth record project. Emma then takes part in the record project 'Note di viaggio - Capitolo 2: non vi succederà niente' by Francesco Guccini, in which she reinterprets the song ''Autunno'' with Roberto Vecchioni.

=== 2021–present: Best of Me and Souvenir ===
On January 15, 2021, was published the collaboration with Alessandra Amoroso "Pezzo di cuore". The song was certified platinum by FIMI and was sung by the singers at the Sanremo Music Festival 2021 as special guests. On June 4 of the same year, the single "Che sogno incredibile" with Loredana Bertè was released. The two singles anticipated Best of Me, a compilation of Emma's greatest hits released on 24 June 2021.

After her last season as a coach on X-Factor, Marrone starred in Gabriele Muccino's Sky Italia series A casa tutti bene, which aired between December 2021 and January 2022. Emma competed at the Sanremo Music Festival 2022 with the song "Ogni volta è così", placing sixth in the final ranking. The song peaked at number 13 on the Italian singles chart and was certified platinum, selling over 100,000 units. Later that year, Marrone was cast for the film Il ritorno, directed by Stefano Chiantini.

On 28 August 2023, Emma announced Souvenir, her seventh studio album which was released on 13 October 2023. The album was preceded by the singles "Mezzo mondo", "Taxi sulla Luna" and "Iniziamo dalla fine". In support of the album, Emma embarked on the Souvenir in Da Club tour in November and December 2023. Emma competed in the Sanremo Music Festival 2024 with the song "Apnea", placing 14th overall. She collaborated with Fabri Fibra and Baby Gang on a new version of the former's 2008 single "In Italia", titled "In Italia 2024", which was released on 23 February 2024. She will embark on the Emma in Da Town tour of Italian arenas in November 2024.

== Vocal and interpretative skills ==
Marrone is a pop and rock musician, with a powerful voice, which is hoarse and raspy. Immersed in music as a child, she identifies Gianna Nannini as her artistic reference point; among her other artistic reference points are Mina and Loredana Bertè. Her timbre biting was noted by critic Mario Luzzatto Fegiz.

The pianist Nazzareno Carusi called out her particular style and wild beauty and her instinctive singing, but suggested she study singing technique so as not to strain her voice.

The singer Roberto Vecchioni worked with Marrone on her interpretive skills, calling her one of the best singers of the moment.

== Philanthropy ==
From the beginning of her career Marrone has taken part in several initiatives of solidarity, social commitment and charity. In February 2011 she participated in the exhibition Se non-ora quando, a movement of protest in support of the rights of women; she participated in the same movement in 2012. In several interviews the singer has said she has always participated, since she was very young, in various social events and worked for social services.

In a March 2011 interview with Gioia, Marrone revealed that in 2009 on the eve of a promotional mini-tour with Mjur, she discovered she had uterine cancer. After a seven-hour emergency surgery in Rome, the tumor was removed and her womb was saved. She then launched a campaign to raise awareness of cancer prevention among young people. From May 2011 Emma offered a testimonial to AIRC (Italian Association for Cancer Research) to help cancer research. Also in 2011 she loaned her image to a campaign dedicated to the prevention of cancer, ANT (National Association of Cancer), ONLUS, which operates free-home health care for those suffering from cancer.

In September 2011, she participated in the inauguration of the Tutti a scuola, broadcast on RAI 1, which was attended, among others, by the President of the Italian Republic Giorgio Napolitano and Francesco Profumo of the Ministry of Education, University and Research. Subsequently, she participated in the concert O'Scià – IX edition, an event born to create awareness of the problem of illegal immigration that for years afflicted the island of Sicily. In the A me piace così Tour, the singer, on the occasion of the referendums of 2011, declared her opposition to nuclear power in Italy, creating a shirt with personally written "Stop Nuclear".

In 2012 Marrone joined the fashion footwear brand Ishikawa. 300 pieces were created, on which the singer personally worked. The proceeds were donated in full to the Association Onus Peter Pan, to help sick children. On 27 May 2012, she participated in the Dream on show, a show organized by the Department for Drug Policy, Minister for International Cooperation and Integration Office of the Prime Minister, to deliver a message against all drugs. On 11 July 2012, she participated in the concert SLAncio di vita, against the SLA, aimed at funding research on amyotrophic lateral sclerosis. In the summer of 2012 she worked with the Civil Protection of Misericordia, donating the entire proceeds of her concert to Lastra a Signa of 21 July, for the purchase of a multi-purpose machine.

== Personal life ==
Marrone was born in Florence, graduated in Aradeo, and now lives in Frascati (near Rome).

At the end of 2009 she began a relationship with Amici di Maria De Filippi dancer Stefano De Martino. Following a brief separation caused by his affair with Giulia Pauselli, another talent show dancer, De Martino announced in March 2011 that he and Marrone were back together. In April 2012, they broke definitively after De Martino had a second affair had with showgirl Belén Rodríguez.

== Discography ==
- A me piace così (2010)
- Sarò libera (2011)
- Schiena (2013)
- Adesso (2015)
- Essere qui (2018)
- Fortuna (2019)
- Souvenir (2023)

== Tour ==
2010

- Ahi ce sta passu Tour

2011

- A me piace così Tour

2012

- Sarò libera Tour

2013

- Schiena Tour

2014

- Emma Limited Edition

2014

- EMMA 3.0

2016

- Adesso Tour

2021

- Fortuna Tour

2023

- Souvenir in Da Club

2024

- Emma in Da Town

=== Band ===
Marrone, who also played the guitar during her Schiena Tour, is accompanied in her concerts by her official band, formed in 2013. The current lineup is as follows:

- Sladü: electric guitars and acoustic guitars (from Schiena Tour)
- Fabrizio Ferraguzzo: electric guitars and acoustic guitars (from Schiena Tour)
- Roberto Cardelli: keyboard (from Schiena Tour)
- Mylious Johnson: drums (from Schiena Tour)
- Matteo Bassi: electric bass (from Schiena Tour)
- Arianna Mereu: vocalist (from Sarò libera Tour)

* We therefore exclude the formation of instrumental and vocal membership of the previous band of which she was a member: Karadreon, Lucky Star, M.j.u.r, Anonimo Soul and H2O.

== Author and songwriter for other singers ==
Collaborations authorship and / or compositions are listed in parentheses in the title.

Year	Title	Artist	Album
2012	"Resta ancora un po'" (text: Emma Marrone; music: Emma Marrone and Pino Perris)	Antonino	Libera quest'anima
2016	"Amore Avrai" (text and music: Emma Marrone, Luca Mattioni, Mario Cianchi.	Elodie	Un'altra vita
2017	"Tutta colpa mia" (text and music: Emma Marrone, Oscar Angiuli, Francesco Cianciola, Giovanni Pollex	Elodie	Tutta colpa mia
2017	"Fine" (text and music: Emma Marrone, Paolo Barillari, Emma Rohan, Jez Ashurst e Mark Bates	Elodie	Tutta colpa mia
2017	"Verrà da sé" (text and music: Emma Marrone, Luca Mattioni, Mario Cianchi	Elodie	Tutta colpa mia

== Filmography ==
=== Films ===
Title	Year	Role	Notes
Benvenuti al Nord	2012	Herself	Cameo appearance
La cena di Natale	2016	Herself (extra)	Uncredited extra
The Best Years	2020	Anna	Feature film debut
Il ritorno	2022	Teresa	
Sbagliata, Ascendente Leone	2022	Herself	Documentary

=== Television ===
Title	Year	Role	Notes
Amici di Maria De Filippi	2009–2010	Contestant	Winner (season 9)
Amici di Maria De Filippi	2012–2013	Coach	White team
Tú sí que vales	2014	Popular judge	Season 1
Sanremo Music Festival 2015	2015	Co-host	Annual music festival
Amici di Maria De Filippi	2015–2018	Coach	White team
Untraditional	2016	Herself	Episode: "The V0ice"
Bake Off Celebrity	2016	Contestant	Cooking contest
Come quando fuori piove	2018	Giorgia Maura's friend	Episode: "Quarta"
The X Factor Italy	2020–2021	Judge	Season 14–15
There's No Place Like Home: The Series	2021–2023	Luana	Main role

== Producer and screenwriter ==
- 2012 – Non sono solo te (music video directed by Gianluca Montesano)

== Awards ==
Ceremony	Year	Category	Nominated work	Result	Ref.
AllMusic Italia Awards	2019	Best Pop/Rock Album	Fortuna	Won	
AllMusic Italia Awards	2022	Female Artist of the Year	Herself	Nominated	
Bama Music Awards	2016	Best Female Act	Herself	Won	
Bama Music Awards	2017	Best Female Act	Herself	Nominated	
Battiti Live	2012	Disco Norba Award	Herself	Won	
Cavalchina Awards	2014	Honoree Award	Herself	Won	
Italia Summer Festival	2014	Song of the Summer	"La mia città"	Won	
Latin Music Italian Awards	2014	Best International Female Video of the Year	"La mia città"	Nominated	
Latin Music Italian Awards	2014	Best International Female Artist Or Group Of The Year	Herself	Nominated	
Latin Music Italian Awards	2015	Best International Female Video of the Year	"Occhi profondi"	Won	
Latin Music Italian Awards	2016	Best International Female Artist of the Year	Herself	Won	
Monza Italian Music Awards	2018	Female Artist of the Year	Herself	Nominated	
MTV Europe Music Awards	2013	Best Italian Act	Herself	Nominated	
MTV Europe Music Awards	2016	Best Italian Act	Herself	Nominated	
MTV Europe Music Awards	2017	Best Italian Act	Herself	Won	
MTV Europe Music Awards	2018	Best Italian Act	Herself	Nominated	
MTV Italian Music Awards	2011	Best Talent Show Artist	Herself	Nominated	
MTV Italian Music Awards	2012	Italian Do It Better	Herself	Won	
MTV Italian Music Awards	2012	Artist Saga	Herself	Nominated	
MTV Italian Music Awards	2013	Wonder Woman Award	Herself	Won	
MTV Italian Music Awards	2014	Artist Saga	Herself	Nominated	
MTV Italian Music Awards	2015	Artist Saga	Herself	Nominated	
MTV Italian Music Awards	2015	#MTVAwardsStar	Herself	Nominated	
MTV Italian Music Awards	2016	Best Italian Female	Herself	Won	
MTV Italian Music Awards	2016	Artist Saga	Herself	Nominated	
MTV Italian Music Awards	2016	#MTVAwardsStar	Herself	Nominated	
Onstage Awards	2015	Best Live Hit	"La mia città"	Nominated	
Onstage Awards	2015	Best Fanbase	#Brownsies	Nominated	
Onstage Awards	2017	Best Female Artist	Herself	Won	
Onstage Awards	2019	Best Female Artist	Herself	Nominated	
Onstage Awards	2020	Best Female Artist	Herself	Won	
Premio Regia Televisiva	2015	Best Television Program	Sanremo Music Festival (as a co-host)	Won	
Premio Regia Televisiva	2015	Best Television Program	Amici di Maria De Filippi (as art director and coach)	Won	
Premio Regia Televisiva	2016	Best Television Program	Amici di Maria De Filippi (as art director and coach)	Won	
Premio Regia Televisiva	2017	Best Television Program	Amici di Maria De Filippi (as art director and coach)	Won	
Rockol Awards	2012	Best Italian Single	"Non è l'inferno"	Nominated	
Rockol Awards	2012	Best Italian Video	"Cercavo amore"	Nominated	
Rockol Awards	2013	Best Italian Video	"Amami"	Won	
Rockol Awards	2013	Best Italian Song	"Amami"	Nominated	
Rockol Awards	2013	Best Italian Album	Schiena	Won	
Rockol Awards	2013	Best Italian Tour/Festival	Schiena Tour	Won	
Rockol Awards	2020	Best Italian Album	Fortuna	Nominated	
Rockol Awards	2023	Best Album	Souvenir	Nominated	
Rockol Awards	2023	Best Live	Souvenir in da Club Tour	Nominated	
Sanremo Music Festival	2012	Sanremo Music Festival - Champions Section	"Non è l'inferno"	Won	
TIM Music Awards	2010	Multi Platinum Disc Awards	Oltre	Won	
TIM Music Awards	2011	Platinum Disc Awards	A me piace così	Won	
TIM Music Awards	2011	Platinum Single Awards	"Arriverà"	Won	
TIM Music Awards	2012	Platinum Disc Awards	Sarò libera	Won	
TIM Music Awards	2013	Gold Disc Award	Schiena	Won	
TIM Music Awards	2013	Gold Song Award	"Amami"	Won	
TIM Music Awards	2014	Multi Platinum Disc Award	Schiena	Won	
TIM Music Awards	2015	Gold Disc Award	E Live	Won	
TIM Music Awards	2016	Platinum Disc Award	Adesso	Won	
TIM Music Awards	2016	Platinum Song Award	"Occhi profondi"	Won	
TIM Music Awards	2017	Gold Disc Award	Essere qui	Won	
TIM Music Awards	2017	Live Award	Adesso Tour	Won	
TIM Music Awards	2017	Arena di Verona Award	Herself	Won	
TIM Music Awards	2018	Gold Disc Award	Essere qui	Won	
TIM Music Awards	2019	Live Award	Essere qui Tour	Won	
TIM Music Awards	2021	Arena di Verona Award	Herself	Won	
Venice Music Award	2010	Best Female Vocalist	Herself	Won	

== Other activities ==
Testimonial
2010

- Fix Design (clothing and jewelry)
- Fili e Grani (jewelry)

2011

- AIRC (Italian Association for Cancer Research-2011 – ongoing)
- ANT (National Association of Cancer-2011 – ongoing)

2012

- Ishikawa (footwear)
- Tezenis (clothing)
- Vogue Eyewear (sunglasses)

Commercials
2010

- Bilboa (sunscreen) with Calore (only song)
- TicToc Samsung

2012

- Hyundai i10 Sound Edition with Cercavo amore
- Hyundai i20 Sound Edition with Maledetto quel giorno

Designer
2011

- Jersey of the A me piace così Tour (against nuclear power in Italy)

2012

- 300 pieces of the Limited Edition Celebrity Soledad footwear Ishikawa (made for charity with the fashion brand)
- Meshes of its merchandising implemented in conjunction with a friend

Awards and achievements
Preceded by Alessandra Amoroso	Amici di Maria De Filippi; Winner; 2010	Succeeded by Denny Lodi
Preceded by Roberto Vecchioni	Sanremo Music Festival; Winner; 2012	Succeeded by Marco Mengoni
Preceded by Marco Mengoni with "L'essenziale"	Italy in the Eurovision Song Contest; 2014	Succeeded by Il Volo with "Grande amore"
