= Alessandra Amoroso discography =

Discography of Italian singer Alessandra Amoroso

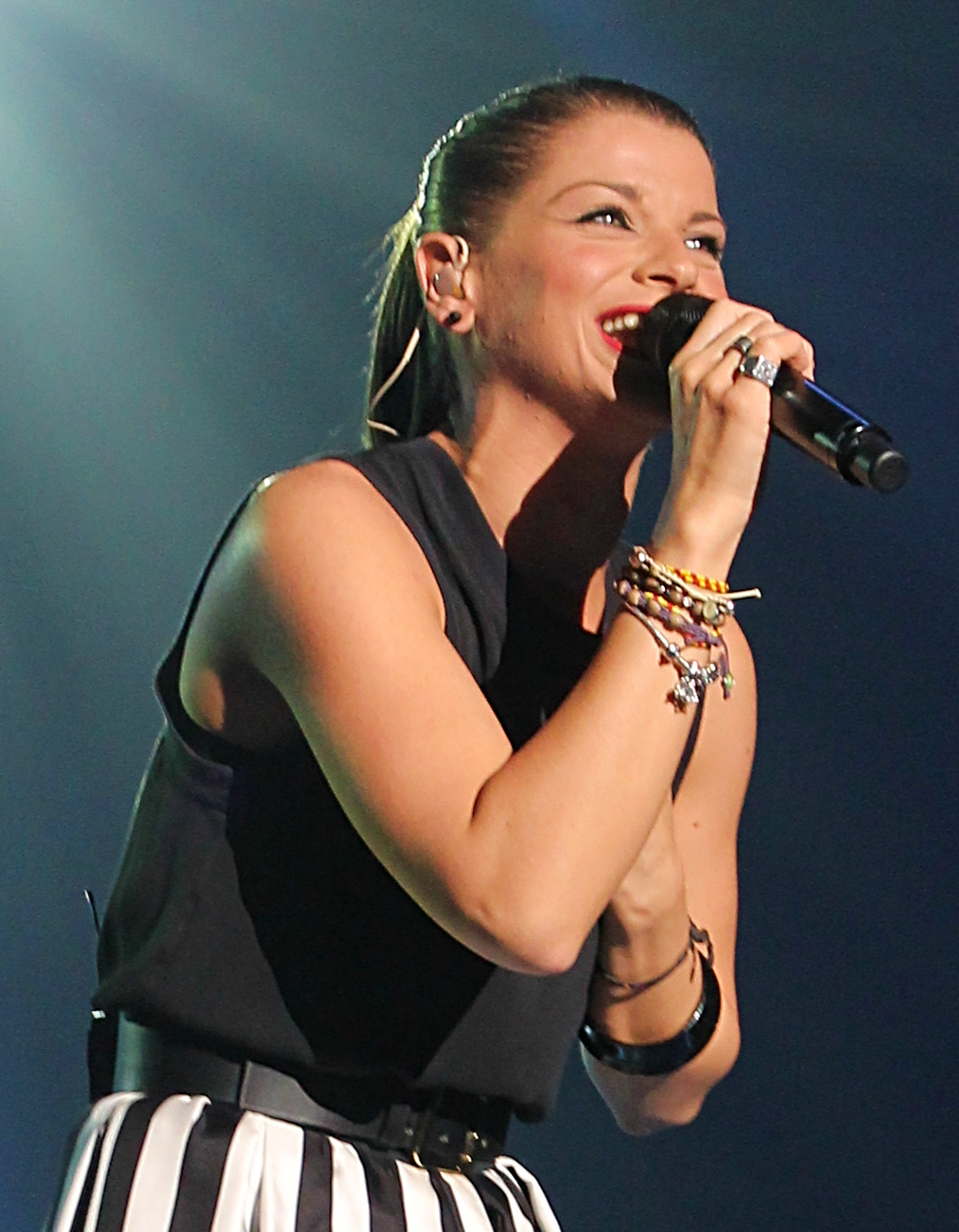
- Amoroso in concert in Florence in 2014 during the Amore Puro Tour
- Studio albums: 8
- EPs: 1
- Live albums: 2
- Compilation albums: 1
- Singles: 44
- Music videos: 42

Italian singer Alessandra Amoroso has released eight studio albums, one compilation album, two live album, one extended play, forty-four singles (including six as a featured artist) and forty-two music videos.

== Albums ==
=== Studio albums ===
List of studio albums, with chart positions and certifications
Title	Details	Peak chart positions		Certifications
Title	Details	ITA	SWI	Certifications
Senza nuvole	Released: 25 September 2009 (ITA); Label: Sony Music Italy; Format: CD, LP, digital download	1	63	FIMI: 4× Platinum
Il mondo in un secondo	Released: 28 September 2010 (ITA); Label: Sony Music Italy; Format: CD, LP, digital download	1	28	FIMI: 4× Platinum
Amore puro	Released: 24 September 2013 (ITA); Label: Sony Music Italy; Format: CD, LP, digital download	1	40	FIMI: 2× Platinum
Alessandra Amoroso	Released: 18 September 2015 (ES, AR); Label: Sony Music Italy; Format: CD, LP, digital download, streaming	—	—	
Vivere a colori	Released: 13 January 2016 (ITA); Label: Sony Music Italy; Format: CD, LP, digital download, streaming	1	22	FIMI: 3× Platinum
10	Released: 5 October 2018 (ITA); Label: Sony Music Italy; Format: CD, LP, digital download, streaming	1	18	FIMI: 2× Platinum
Tutto accade	Released: 22 October 2021 (ITA); Label: Sony Music Italy; Format: CD, LP, digital download, streaming	2	55	FIMI: Platinum
Io non sarei	Released: 13 June 2025 (ITA); Label: Sony Music Italy, Epic; Format: CD, LP, digital download, streaming	1	—	FIMI: Gold

=== Live albums ===
- Cinque passi in più (2011) – ITA: 3× Platinum
- 10, io, noi (2019)

== Extended plays ==
List of extended plays, with chart positions and certifications
Title	Details	Peak chart positions	Certifications
Title	Details	ITA	Certifications
Stupida	Released: 10 April 2009; Label: Sony Music Italy; Format: CD, LP, digital download	1	FIMI: 4× Platinum

== Singles ==
=== As lead artist ===
List of singles as lead artist, with selected chart positions, showing year released and album name
Title	Year	Peak positions				Certifications	Album
Title	Year	ITA	POL	SMR	SWI	Certifications	Album
"Immobile"	2009	1	—	*	—	FIMI: Platinum	Stupida
"Stupida"	2009	1	—	*	64		Stupida
"Estranei a partire da ieri"	2009	6	—	*	—		Senza nuvole
"Senza nuvole"	2009	6	—	*	—	FIMI: Platinum	Senza nuvole
"Mi sei venuto a cercare tu"	2010	29	—	*	—		Senza nuvole
"Arrivi tu"	2010	38	—	*	—		Senza nuvole
"La mia storia con te"	2010	2	—	*	—	FIMI: Platinum	Il mondo in un secondo
"Urlo e non mi senti"	2010	27	—	*	—		Il mondo in un secondo
"Niente"	2011	66	—	—	—		Il mondo in un secondo
"Dove sono i colori"	2011	—	—	—	—		Il mondo in un secondo
"È vero che vuoi restare"	2011	13	—	—	—	FIMI: Gold	Cinque passi in più
"Ti aspetto"	2012	51	—	—	—		Cinque passi in più
"Ciao"	2012	11	—	—	—	FIMI: Gold	Cinque passi in più
"Amore puro"	2013	4	—	—	—	FIMI: Platinum	Amore puro
"Fuoco d'artificio"	2013	49	—	—	—		Amore puro
"Non devi perdermi"	2014	25	—	—	—	FIMI: Platinum	Amore puro
"Bellezza, incanto e nostalgia"	2014	18	—	—	—	FIMI: Gold	Amore puro
"L'hai dedicato a me"	2014	—	—	—	—		Amore puro
"Stupendo fino a qui"	2015	—	—	—	—		Vivere a colori
"Comunque andare"	2016	11	—	—	—	FIMI: 4× Platinum	Vivere a colori
"Vivere a colori"	2016	33	—	—	—	FIMI: 2× Platinum	Vivere a colori
"Sul ciglio senza far rumore"	2016	36	—	—	—	FIMI: 2× Platinum	Vivere a colori
"Fidati ancora di me"	2017	99	—	—	—	FIMI: Platinum	Vivere a colori
"La stessa"	2018	13	—	—	—	FIMI: Platinum	10
"Trova un modo"	2018	46	—	—	—	FIMI: Gold	10
"Dalla tua parte"	2019	—	—	—	—	FIMI: Gold	10
"Forza e coraggio"	2019	—	—	—	—		10
"Immobile 10+1"	2019	—	—	—	—		10, io, noi
"Karaoke" (with Boomdabash)	2020	1	—	1	44	FIMI: 6× Platinum	Don't Worry (Best of 2005-2020)
"Pezzo di cuore" (with Emma)	2021	2	—	22	—	FIMI: Platinum	Best of Me
"Piuma"	2021	—	—	—	—		Tutto accade
"Sorriso grande"	2021	36	—	15	—	FIMI: Platinum	Tutto accade
"Tutte le volte"	2021	66	—	13	—		Tutto accade
"Canzone inutile"	2021	—	—	39	—	FIMI: Gold	Tutto accade
"Camera 209" (with DB Boulevard)	2022	42	—	15	—	FIMI: Platinum	Tutto accade
"Notti blu"	2022	68	—	14	—	FIMI: Gold	Tutto accade
"Fino a qui"	2024	12	—	27	—	FIMI: Platinum	Io non sarei
"Mezzo rotto" (featuring BigMama)	2024	6	51	6	—	FIMI: 2× Platinum; ZPAV: Gold	Io non sarei
"Si mette male"	2024	51	—	11	—		Io non sarei
"Rimani rimani rimani"	2024	—	—	—	—		Io non sarei
"Cose stupide"	2025	64	—	—	—		Io non sarei
"Serenata" (with Serena Brancale)	2025	3	—	—	—	FIMI: Platinum	Io non sarei
"—" denotes a single that did not chart or was not released. "*" denotes the chart did not exist at that time.

=== As featured artist ===
List of singles as featured artist, with selected chart positions, showing year released and album name
Title	Year	Peak positions		Certifications	Album
Title	Year	ITA	SMR	Certifications	Album
"L'amore altrove" (Francesco Renga featuring Alessandra Amoroso)	2015	35	—	FIMI: Gold	Tempo reale
"A tre passi da te" (Boomdabash featuring Alessandra Amoroso)	2015	89	—	FIMI: Platinum	Radio Revolution
"Sei bellissima" (Loredana Bertè featuring Alessandra Amoroso)	2016	—	—		Amici non ne ho... ma amiche sì!
"Piccole cose" (J-Ax and Fedez featuring Alessandra Amoroso)	2017	3	—	FIMI: 2× Platinum	Comunisti col Rolex
"Due destini" (Tiromancino featuring Alessandra Amoroso)	2018	45	—		Fino a qui
"Mambo salentino" (Boomdabash featuring Alessandra Amoroso)	2019	4	2	FIMI: 3× Platinum	Don't Worry (Best of 2005-2020)
"—" denotes a single that did not chart or was not released.

=== Other collaborations ===
Year	Song	Featuring	Album
2009	Credo nell'amore	Gianni Morandi	Canzoni da non-perdere
2009	Un solo mondo	Claudio Baglioni	Q.P.G.A.
2009	Questo natale	Deejay All Stars	Questo natale
2010	Maniac	Neri per Caso	Donne

== Music videos ==
Year	Videoclip	Director	Length
2009	"Stupida"	Gaetano Morbioli	3 min. 37 sec.
2009	"Estranei a partire da ieri"	Gaetano Morbioli	4 min. 8 sec.
2009	"Senza nuvole"	Pat Marrone	3 min. 48 sec.
2010	"Arrivi tu"	Gaetano Morbioli	3 min. 37 sec.
2010	"La mia storia con te"	Jansen & Basile	3 min. 50 sec.
2010	"Urlo e non-mi senti"	Marco Salomon e Saku	3 min. 39 sec.
2011	"Niente"		3 min. 25 sec.
2011	"Dove sono i colori"	Marco Salomon e Saku	3 min. 51 sec.
2011	"È vero che vuoi restare"	Marco Salomon e Saku	3 min. 50 sec.
2012	"Ti aspetto"	Gaetano Morbioli	3 min. 40 sec.
2012	"Ciao"		3 min. 45 sec.
2013	"Amore puro"	Gaetano Morbioli	4 min. 27 sec.
2013	"Fuoco d'artificio"	Gaetano Morbioli	4 min. 16 sec.
2014	"Non devi perdermi"	Gaetano Morbioli	3 min. 28 sec.
2014	"Bellezza, incanto e nostalgia"	Gaetano Morbioli	4 min. 22 sec.
2014	"L'hai dedicato a me"	Gaetano Morbioli	3 min. 37 sec.
2015	"L'amore altrove"	Gaetano Morbioli	3 min. 26 sec.
2015	"Grito y no me escuchas"	Gaetano Morbioli	3 min. 41 sec.
2015	"Me siento sola"	Gustavo A. Garzon	3 min. 34 sec.
2015	"Stupendo fino a qui"	Gaetano Morbioli	4 min. 7 sec.
2016	"Este amor lo vale"	Marco Salom	4 min. 4 sec.
2016	"Comunque andare"	YouNuts!	3 min. 43 sec.
2016	"Vivere a colori"	Mauro Russo	4 min. 35 sec.
2016	"Sul ciglio senza far rumore"	Cosimo Alemà	3 min. 46 sec.
2017	"Piccole cose"	Mauro Russo	3 min. 45 sec.
2017	"Fidati ancora di me"	Mauro Russo	3 min. 51 sec.
2018	"La stessa"	Gaetano Morbioli	3 min. 46 sec.
2018	"Trova un modo"	YouNuts!	3 min. 50 sec.
2019	"Dalla tua parte"	YouNuts!	3 min. 50 sec.
2019	"Forza e coraggio"	YouNuts!	3 min. 30 sec.
2019	"Mambo salentino"	Fabrizio Conte	2 min. 48 sec.
2019	"Immobile 10+1"	Attilio Cusani	3 min. 36 sec.
2020	"Karaoke"	Fabrizio Conte	2 min. 50 sec.
2021	"Pezzo di cuore"	Bendo	3 min. 47 sec.
2021	"Piuma"	YouNuts!	4 min. 3 sec.
2021	"Sorriso grande"	YouNuts!	3 min. 37 sec.
2021	"Tutte le volte"	Bendo	3 min. 24 sec.
2021	"Canzone inutile"	Bendo	4 min. 12 sec.
2022	"Camera 209"	Amedeo Zancanella	2 min. 56 sec.
2022	"Notti blu"	Lorenzo Catapano	3 min. 37 sec.
2024	"Fino a qui"	Matteo Mavero	3 min. 56 sec.
2024	"Mezzo rotto"	Byron Rosero	3 min. 14 sec.
