= List of number-one hits of 2009 (Italy) =

This is a list of the number-one hits of 2009 on FIMI's Italian Singles and Albums Charts.

Note: Charts started being published on Mondays as of the issue dated 6 July 2009.

Week	Issue date	Song	Artist	Album	Artist
1	2 January	"Novembre"	Giusy Ferreri	Primavera in anticipo	Laura Pausini
2	9 January	"Novembre"	Giusy Ferreri	Primavera in anticipo	Laura Pausini
3	16 January	"Immobile"	Alessandra Amoroso	Alla mia età	Tiziano Ferro
4	23 January	"Meraviglioso"	Negramaro	Working on a Dream	Bruce Springsteen
5	30 January	"Meraviglioso"	Negramaro	Working on a Dream	Bruce Springsteen
6	6 February	"Meraviglioso"	Negramaro	Un'altra direzione	Nek
7	13 February	"Meraviglioso"	Negramaro	Alla mia età	Tiziano Ferro
8	20 February	"Sincerità"	Arisa	Le donne	Antonello Venditti
9	27 February	"Sincerità"	Arisa	No Line on the Horizon	U2
10	6 March	"Sincerità"	Arisa	No Line on the Horizon	U2
11	13 March	"Sincerità"	Arisa	No Line on the Horizon	U2
12	20 March	"Sincerità"	Arisa	Presente	Renato Zero
13	27 March	"Sincerità"	Arisa	Presente	Renato Zero
14	3 April	"Sentimento"	Valerio Scanu	Presente	Renato Zero
15	10 April	"Stupida"	Alessandra Amoroso	Stupida	Alessandra Amoroso
16	17 April	"You've Got a Friend"	X Factor finalists 2009	Sounds of the Universe	Depeche Mode
17	24 April	"L'amor carnale"	The Bastard Sons of Dioniso	Sounds of the Universe	Depeche Mode
18	1 May	"Parla con me"	Eros Ramazzotti	Stupida	Alessandra Amoroso
19	8 May	"Domani 21/04.09"	Artisti Uniti per l'Abruzzo	Stupida	Alessandra Amoroso
20	15 May	"Domani 21/04.09"	Artisti Uniti per l'Abruzzo	21st Century Breakdown	Green Day
21	22 May	"Domani 21/04.09"	Artisti Uniti per l'Abruzzo	Ali e radici	Eros Ramazzotti
22	29 May	"Domani 21/04.09"	Artisti Uniti per l'Abruzzo	Ali e radici	Eros Ramazzotti
23	5 June	"Domani 21/04.09"	Artisti Uniti per l'Abruzzo	Ali e radici	Eros Ramazzotti
24	12 June	"Domani 21/04.09"	Artisti Uniti per l'Abruzzo	Ali e radici	Eros Ramazzotti
25	19 June	"Domani 21/04.09"	Artisti Uniti per l'Abruzzo	Ali e radici	Eros Ramazzotti
26	26 June	"Domani 21/04.09"	Artisti Uniti per l'Abruzzo	Ali e radici	Eros Ramazzotti
27	6 July	"Domani 21/04.09"	Artisti Uniti per l'Abruzzo	Michael Jackson	Thriller
28	13 July	"Domani 21/04.09"	Artisti Uniti per l'Abruzzo	Michael Jackson	King of Pop
29	20 July	"Domani 21/04.09"	Artisti Uniti per l'Abruzzo	Michael Jackson	King of Pop
30	27 July	"Domani 21/04.09"	Artisti Uniti per l'Abruzzo	Michael Jackson	King of Pop
31	3 August	"When Love Takes Over"	David Guetta featuring Kelly Rowland	Michael Jackson	King of Pop
32	10 August	"Celebration"	Madonna	Michael Jackson	King of Pop
33	17 August	"When Love Takes Over"	David Guetta featuring Kelly Rowland	Michael Jackson	King of Pop
34	24 August	"I Gotta Feeling"	The Black Eyed Peas	Michael Jackson	King of Pop
35	31 August	"I Gotta Feeling"	The Black Eyed Peas	I Look to You	Whitney Houston
36	7 September	"L'amore si odia"	Noemi featuring Fiorella Mannoia	The Resistance	Muse
37	14 September	"L'amore si odia"	Noemi featuring Fiorella Mannoia	Celebration	Madonna
38	21 September	"Ad ogni costo"	Vasco Rossi	Senza nuvole	Alessandra Amoroso
39	28 September	"Ad ogni costo"	Vasco Rossi	Senza nuvole	Alessandra Amoroso
40	5 October	"I Gotta Feeling"	Black Eyed Peas	Senza nuvole	Alessandra Amoroso
41	12 October	"Bodies"	Robbie Williams	Senza nuvole	Alessandra Amoroso
42	19 October	"Ti vorrei sollevare"	Elisa and Giuliano Sangiorgi	Crazy Love	Michael Bublé
43	26 October	"Ti vorrei sollevare"	Elisa and Giuliano Sangiorgi	This Is It	Michael Jackson
44	2 November	"I Gotta Feeling"	Black Eyed Peas	This Is It	Michael Jackson
45	9 November	"Salvami"	Gianna Nannini and Giorgia	Heart	Elisa
46	16 November	"Salvami"	Gianna Nannini and Giorgia	Heart	Elisa
47	23 November	"Salvami"	Gianna Nannini and Giorgia	Tracks 2 (inediti & rarità)	Vasco Rossi
48	30 November	"Dove si vola"	Marco Mengoni	Tracks 2 (inediti & rarità)	Vasco Rossi
49	7 December	"Bad Romance"	Lady Gaga	My Christmas	Andrea Bocelli
50	14 December	"Bad Romance"	Lady Gaga	My Christmas	Andrea Bocelli
51	21 December	"Bad Romance"	Lady Gaga	My Christmas	Andrea Bocelli
52	28 December	"Bad Romance"	Lady Gaga	Tracks 2 (inediti & rarità)	Vasco Rossi

== See also ==
- 2009 in music
- List of number-one hits in Italy
