= Fino a qui =

Single by Alessandra Amoroso

from the album Io non sarei
- Released: 7 February 2024
- Genre: Pop
- Length: 3:52
- Label: Epic
- Songwriters: Alessandra Amoroso; Federica Abbate; Jacopo Ettorre; Alessandro Merli; Fabio Clemente; Pierfrancesco Pasini
- Producer: Takagi & Ketra

Alessandra Amoroso singles chronology
"Notti blu" (2022)	"Fino a qui" (2024)	"Mezzo rotto" (2024)

Music video
- "Fino a qui" on YouTube

"Fino a qui" (transl. "So far") is a song co-written and recorded by Italian singer Alessandra Amoroso. It was released on 7 February 2024 through Epic as the lead single from her eighth studio album, Io non sarei.

The song competed in the Sanremo Music Festival 2024, ranking ninth out of 30 entries. It marked the singer's first participation in Italy's musical festival which doubles also as a selection of the act for Eurovision Song Contest.

== Background and composition ==
The song was written by the singer herself with Federica Abbate, Jacopo Ettorre, Pierfrancesco Pasini, and the record producer duo Takagi & Ketra. The lyrics quoted Mathieu Kassovitz's 1995 film La Haine ("So far, so good") and Vasco Rossi's song "Sally".

In the press conference the singer explained that she agreed to record the song, initially proposed by Takagi and Ketra, because it reflected a difficult time in her life. Amoroso recounted that in the period between 2022 and 2023 she was subjected to a media pillory against her following the release of the album Tutto accade and the concert held at Milan's San Siro; the consequences of this hate campaign led her to the decision to temporarily distance herself from public life, moving to Colombia for a few months and to begin a course of psychotherapy:

"[Slowly] as the piece took shape, I realized that it represented exactly that moment of mine. It contained references to La Haine, a movie in which, among the most significant scenes, is the one in which the main characters tell of a man who, throwing himself from the 50th floor of a building, at each floor as he plummets says to himself, "So far so good, so far so good." That image brought a knot to my stomach. I took that image, interpreted it in my own way, and realized that I could give it a different ending than the movie. I decided that, as far as I'm concerned, it doesn't count the fall, it doesn't even count the landing, because unfortunately you don't always land softly. The thing that matters is how you get back up after a fall, and especially what you decide to learn from that fall. And that is how my Up to Here was born."

== Reception ==
Andrea Laffranchi of Corriere della Sera described the song as a ballad that "oscillates between rhythm and drama for the personal narrative." Silvia Danielli of Billboard Italia also defines the song as a "ballad with a very emphatic refrain" in which she talks about "a personal suffering and 'anti-panic candy at 2. 43". Andrea Conti of Il Fatto Quotidiano appreciated the piano introduction of "a ballad that will be enhanced to the maximum by the orchestra", whose lyrics express "a portrait of herself, but also of the courage to rise again, after a difficult moment".

Il Messaggero stated that the song is "traditional and canonical", with sounds and production that can be associated with the singer's debut songs "Immobile" and "Stupida".[15] Filippo Ferrari of Rolling Stone Italia also wrote that the song has a "clean production and gets charged up in the chorus thanks to the percussion" similar to Amoroso's early in career songs.

== Music video ==
The music video for the song, directed by Matteo Mavero, was released on February 7, 2024, through the singer's YouTube channel.

== Charts ==
Chart performance for "Fino a qui"
Chart (2024)	Peak position
Italy (FIMI)	12
Italy Airplay (EarOne)	31

== Certifications ==
Region	Certification	Certified units/sales
Italy (FIMI)	Platinum	100,000^{‡}
^{‡} Sales+streaming figures based on certification alone.
