= Senza nuvole =

Studio album by Alessandra Amoroso
- Released: 25 September 2009
- Genre: Pop; R&B
- Length: 39:49
- Label: Sony Music Italy
- Producer: Simone Papi

Alessandra Amoroso chronology
Stupida (2009)	Senza nuvole (2009)	Il mondo in un secondo (2010)

Singles from Senza nuvole
- 1. "Estranei a partire da ieri" Released: 24 August 2009; 2. "Senza nuvole" Released: 16 October 2009; 3. "Mi sei venuto a cercare tu" Released: 22 January 2010; 4. "Arrivi tu" Released: 2 April 2010

Senza nuvole is the debut studio album by Italian singer Alessandra Amoroso. It was released on September 25, 2009 by Sony Music Italy. The album consists of ten tracks recorded in the spring and summer 2009. The album was certified triple platinum by the Federation of the Italian Music Industry.

== The album ==
The formalization of the album's release dates back to July 31, 2009. The disc is composed of ten tracks recorded in the summer 2009 implemented with an eleventh download able tracks from the album iTunes. In addition to the normal version, there is a limited edition of the album with a DVD, entitled A day with Alessandra. Moreover, even for those who buy the version with only the CD, there's the possibility to subscribe to the opendisc and thus have access to a range of tools, artwork, photographs and news previews. Moreover, members of the opendisc could participate in a competition for a place to Limelight, in Milan, where Alessandra has submitted the album on October 8.

Beginning Thursday September 17, the songs of Senza nuvole could be heard thanks to an initiative of MTV, which published the daily songs from the album on their site. From the September 24 the entire album was in streaming on the same site.

The album debuted at number one in the fimi charts, and remained in that position for four weeks. On October 6 Senza nuvole won the first platinum disc.

The second single from the album is the title trackSenza nuvole.

=== The dvd, A day with Alessandra ===
In addition to the CD only version is also published a limited edition containing a DVD. This DVD, titled A day with Alessandra, lets go a virtually day with the artist of the album, in fact.

In addition to video clips of Stupida, there are video backstage on the set of photo shoots, backstage at the concert in Bari, Radionorba Battili Live, video of recording studio and an interview narrative "Alessandra interviews Alessandra", in which Alessandra interview herself trying to make her fans know her better. Furthermore, there are also a series of exclusive movies absolutely dedicated to the fans.

== Track listing ==
Senza nuvole – Standard track listing
No.	Title	Lyrics	Music	Length
1.	"Estranei a partire da ieri"	Federica Camba; Daniele Coro	Camba; Coro	4:04
2.	"Senza nuvole"	Camba; Coro	Camba; Coro	3:43
3.	"Mi sei venuto a cercare tu"	Marco Ciappelli; Diego Calvetti	Calvetti	4:05
4.	"Ama chi ti vuole bene"	Camba; Coro	Camba; Coro	3:49
5.	"L'amore non è un gioco"	Saverio Grandi	Grandi	3:49
6.	"Segreto"	Andrea Bonomo	Luca Chiaravalli	4:03
7.	"Arrivi tu"	Camba; Coro	Camba; Coro	3:40
8.	"Bellissimo"	Cesare Chiodo; Emiliano Cecere	Chiodo; Cecere	3:47
9.	"Il cielo può attendere"	Mirko Tommasi	Enrico Spagnolo; Giuseppe Beghini	4:31
10.	"Che peccato"	Orsola Branzi	Emiliano Pepe	4:23

Senza nuvole – iTunes edition bonus track
No.	Title	Length
11.	"Bellissimo" (Acoustic version)	3:47

== Charts ==
Chart	Peak position
Italy Albums Chart FIMI	1
Swiss Albums Chart	63

== Senza Nuvole Live Tour ==
Senza Nuvole Live Tour
- Tour by Alessandra Amoroso
- Location: Italy
- Associated album: Senza nuvole, Stupida
- Start date: January 21, 2010
- End date: March 13, 2010
- No. of shows: 30Italy

Alessandra Amoroso concert chronology
- Stupida Tour; Senza Nuvole Live Tour; Un'Estate Senza Nuvole Live Tour

In January 2010 began the Senza Nuvole Live Tour. The tour ended on March 13, 2010, at Padua.

Personnel

Alessandra Amoroso – vocals
Simone Papi – Show director, musical director, keyboards
Giacomo Castellano – Guitar
David Pieralisi – Guitar
Alessandro Magnalasche – Guitar
Roberto Bassi – Keyboards
David Pecchioli – Drums
Ronny Aglietti – Guitar
Luciana Vaona – backing vocals

Setlist

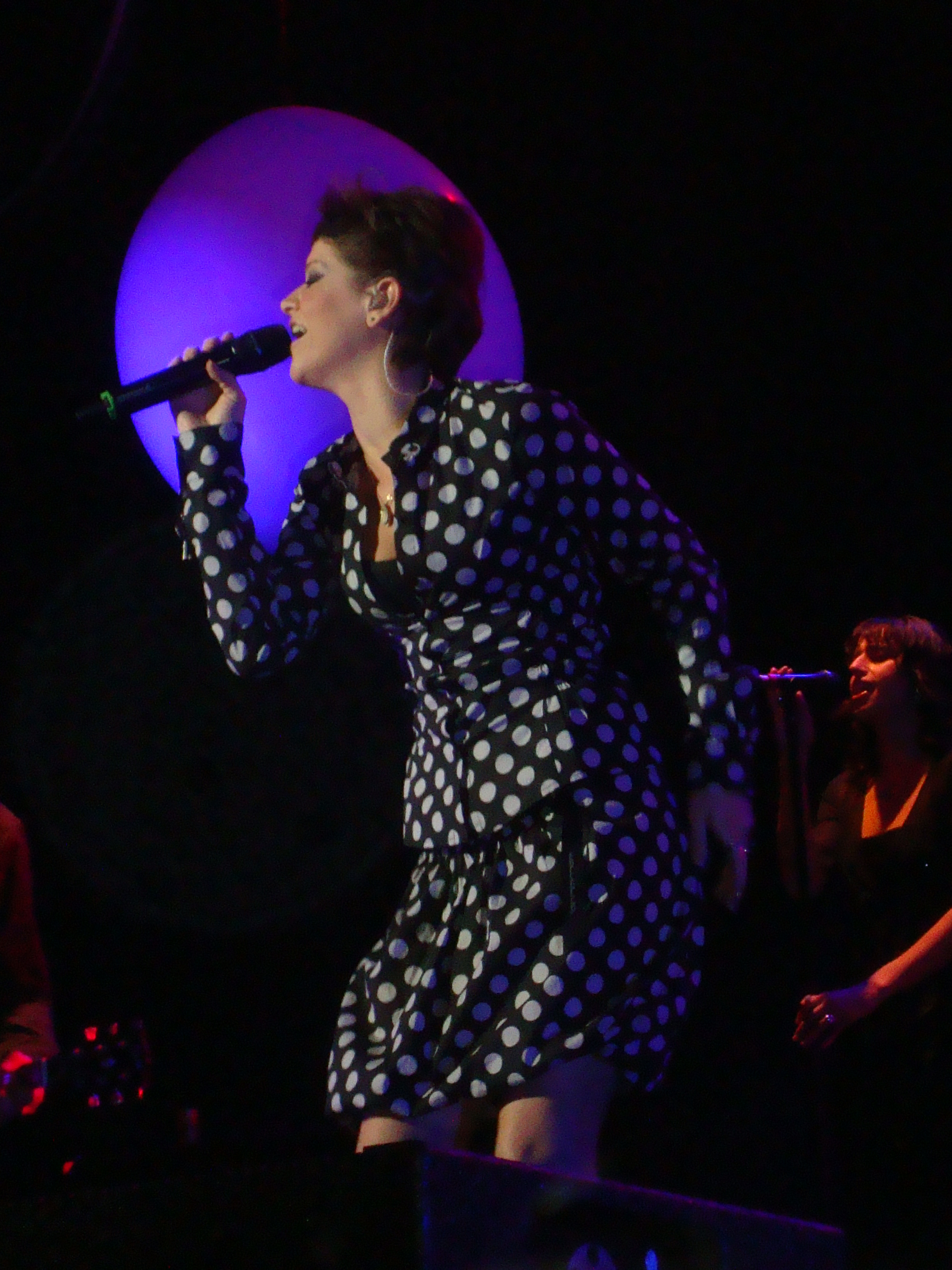
Alessandra Amoroso in one of the shows of Senza Nuvole Live Tour.

1. Segreto
2. Ama chi ti vuole bene
3. Mi sei venuto a cercare tu
4. Splendida follia
5. X ora, x un po'
6. Il cielo puo' attendere
7. Bellissimo
8. Da qui
9. Arrivi tu
10. Stella incantevole
11. Find a Way
12. If I Ain't Got You (cover of Alicia Keys)
13. Respect (cover of Aretha Franklin)
14. Chain of Fools (cover of Aretha Franklin)
15. Almeno tu nell'universo (cover of Mia Martini)
16. L'amore non è un gioco
17. Estranei a partire da ieri
18. Senza nuvole
19. Immobile
20. Stupida

Tour dates

Year	Month	Day	Show
2010	January	21	Lecce, Palasport
2010	January	22	Bari, Teatro Team
2010	January	23	Rome, Gran Teatro
2010	January	24	Arezzo, Centro congressi
2010	January	29	Florence, Teatro Saschall
2010	January	30	Montecatini Terme, Teatro Verdi
2010	January	30	Lucca, UHB
2010	January	31	Cesena, Teatro Carisport
2010	February	4	Montesilvano, Palazzetto
2010	February	7	Palermo, Teatro Dante
2010	February	8	Vittoria, Teatro Vittoria Colonna
2010	February	9	Catania, Teatro Metropolitan
2010	February	10	Cosenza, Teatro Rendano
2010	February	12	Pordenone, Palasport
2010	February	13	Bussolengo, Teatro Tenda
2010	February	20	Milan, Teatro Smeraldo
2010	February	21	Milan, Teatro Smeraldo
2010	February	22	Bergamo, Teatro Creberg
2010	February	27	Naples, Teatro Palapartenope
2010	February	28	Andria, Palazzetto
2010	March	1	Fermo, Palazzetto
2010	March	3	Genoa – Vaillant Palace
2010	March	4	Turin – Teatro Colosseo
2010	March	5	Pavia – Palazzetto
2010	March	6	Piacenza – Teatro Politeama
2010	March	8	Bologna – Teatro Europa
2010	March	9	Trieste – Teatro Rossetti
2010	March	10	Trento – Auditorium Santa Chiara
2010	March	11	Brescia – Palabrescia
2010	March	13	Padua – Palasport

== Un'Estate Senza Nuvole Live Tour ==
Un'Estate Senza Nuvole Live Tour
- Tour by Alessandra Amoroso
- Location: Italy
- Associated album: Senza nuvole, Stupida
- Start date: July 4, 2010
- End date: September 12, 2010
- No. of shows: 22 Italy

Alessandra Amoroso concert chronology
- Senza Nuvole Live Tour; Un'Estate Senza Nuvole Live Tour; /

On July 4, 2010, began Un'Estate Senza Nuvole Live Tour, which lead Alessandra touring throughout the summer 2010 from July 4 to September 12. The personnel was the same of the Senza Nuvole Live Tour.

Setlist

1. Arrivi tu
2. Ama chi ti vuole bene
3. Il cielo puo' attendere
4. L'amore non è un gioco
5. X ora, x un po'
6. Segreto
7. Stella incantevole
8. Mi sei venuto a cercare tu
9. Medley: Bellissimo, Splendida follia e Da qui
10. Find a way
11. Think (cover di Aretha Franklin)
12. The Boss (cover di Diana Ross)
13. Reach out (cover di Gloria Gaynor)
14. I'll Be There (cover di Gloria Gaynor)
15. Respect (cover di Aretha Franklin)
16. Chain of Fools (cover di Aretha Franklin)
17. Almeno tu nell'universo (cover di Mia Martini)
18. Senza nuvole
19. Stupida
20. Estranei a partire da ieri
21. Immobile
22. La mia storia con te*

*This song was inserted into the setlist from the stage of Cagliari.

Tour dates

Anno	Mese	Giorno	Tappa
2010	July	4	Noci, Foro Boario
2010	July	5	Margherita di Savoia -Saline
2010	July	8	Lecce – Piazza Libertini
2010	July	15	Trivero – Piazza del Mercato
2010	July	17	Cervia – Piazza Garibaldi
2010	July	18	Mantua – Palazzo Te
2010	July	22	Afragola – Campo Sportivo
2010	July	23	Ostia Antica – Teatro Romano
2010	July	27	Catanzaro – Arena Magna Grecia
2010	July	29	Grado – Diga Nazario Sauro
2010	July	30	Marsciano – Musica per i Borghi
2010	July	31	Sottomarina di Chioggia – Arena
2010	August	2	Cremona, -Arena Giardino
2010	August	4	Piombino – Piazza Bovio
2010	August	5	Viareggio – Cittadella del Carnevale
2010	August	7	Pontelandolfo – piazza Roma
2010	August	28	Palermo – Teatro di Verdura
2010	August	29	Taormina – Teatro Greco
2010	September	1	Lanusei – Teatro Tonio Dei
2010	September	3	Cagliari – Anfiteatro Romano
2010	September	4	Alghero – Anfiteatro Maria Pia
2010	September	12	Carpi – Piazza Martiri
