= Dímelo =

Dímelo may refer to

== Music ==
- "Dímelo" (Paulo Londra song)
- "Dimelo" (Rak-Su song)
- Dímelo, album by Manzanita (2000)
- "Dímelo", the Spanish version of "Do You Know? (The Ping Pong Song)" by Enrique Iglesias
- "Dímelo", the Spanish version of "I Need to Know" by Marc Anthony
- "Dímelo", the Spanish version of "Say It" by Voices of Theory

== See also ==
- "Dímelo a mí", Spanish version of "Parla con me" by Eros Ramazzotti
