= Find a Way =

Find a Way may refer to:

- "Find a Way" (Alessandra Amoroso song), 2009
- "Find a Way" (Amy Grant song), 1985
- "Find a Way" (A Tribe Called Quest song), 1998
- "Find a Way", a song by Coldcut from Some Like It Cold, 1990
- "Find a Way" (Dwele song), 2003
- "Find a Way", a song by Faithless, 2025
- "Find a Way", a song by Kwesta featuring Kruna and Soweto Gospel Choir
