= Comunque andare =

Single by Alessandra Amoroso

from the album Vivere a colori
- Released: 26 February 2016
- Genre: Dance pop
- Length: 3:38
- Label: Columbia
- Songwriters: Alessandra Amoroso; Elisa Toffoli
- Producer: Andrea Rigonat

Alessandra Amoroso singles chronology
"Este amor lo vale" (2016)	"Comunque andare" (2016)	"Vivere a colori" (2016)

Music video
- "Comunque andare" on YouTube

Comunque andare" (transl. "However going") is a song co-written and recorded by Italian singer Alessandra Amoroso. It was released on 16 February 2016 through Columbia Records, as the second single from her fifth studio album Vivere a colori. The song was written by Amoroso with co-writing contribution by Italian singer-songwriter Elisa.

== Composition ==
The song, written by Italian singer-songwriter Elisa with Amoroso, is characterized by dance sounds combined with lyrics steeped in positivity. Elisa, writing the song, told to Amoroso, "I wrote it thinking about your rare ability to always appear happy, even when it is difficult. Now let's finish it together."

== Music video ==
The music video for the song, directed by YouNuts, was released on February 7, 2024, through the singer's YouTube channel. The video was associated to the once produced for "Ironic" by Alanis Morissette.

== Charts performance ==
Chart (2016)	Peak position
Italy (FIMI)	11
Italy (Airplay)	8

=== Year-end charts ===
Chart (2016)	Position
Italy (FIMI)	31

== Certifications ==
Certifications for "Comunque andare"
Region	Certification	Certified units/sales
Italy (FIMI)	4× Platinum	200,000^{‡}
^{‡} Sales+streaming figures based on certification alone.
