= La rabbia non ti basta =

Single by BigMama

from the album Sangue
- Released: 7 February 2024
- Genre: Dance pop; pop rap
- Length: 3:09
- Label: Epic
- Songwriters: Marianna Mammone; Maria Lodovica Lazzerini
- Producers: Enrico Botta; Enrico Brun

BigMama singles chronology
"Bloody Mary" (2024)	"La rabbia non ti basta" (2024)	"Fa strano (Lady Marmalade)" (2024)

Music video
- "La rabbia non ti basta" on YouTube

"La rabbia non ti basta" (transl. "Anger is not enough for you") is a song written and recorded by Italian rapper BigMama. It was released on 7 February 2024 through Epic Records.

The song competed in the 74th Sanremo Music Festival, where it placed 22nd in the grand final. The song peaked at No. 25 on the FIMI Single Chart, becoming BigMama's first entry on the chart.

== Composition ==
The song, written by the rapper herself with Maria Lodovica Lazzerini and produced by Enrico Botta and Enrico Brun, deals with the theme of managing emotions and anger control. In an interview with Rolling Stone Italia, the singer explained the meaning of the song:

"I have changed a lot over the years, I have grown a lot, I have learnt to channel my feelings in a more mature way. But I admit I still suffer from people's looks and judgement. But I have turned around in my approach, because I have made peace with myself. Of course a certain insecurity remains in some respects. [...] Since its birth, rap has always been a mirror of society. So to complain about lyrics that are too harsh is to be unhappy with the society you live in. I would recommend doing a deep recap on the various phases in which society has moved and then comment on the rappers. I have always used music as a personal outlet. I have had an edgy life and I want my words to be just as edgy."

== Critical reception ==
Vincenzo Nasto of Fanpage.it described "La rabbia non ti basta" as "a song that plays with the balance between rap and dancefloor," in which BigMama expresses "a sense of revenge and her own personal acceptance." Gianni Sibilla of Rockol also associated the song's sounds with contemporary electronica, finding BigMama's interpretation "convincing."

Andrea Conti of Il Fatto Quotidiano stated that BigMama chose an "accomplished debut between sound and lyrics" that "speaks of personal revenge." Similarly, Fabio Fiume of All Music Italia wrote that the song has "important lyrics, explained with comprehensible words" aiming at an uptempo urban sound "of the rhythm that conquers."

== Music video ==
The music video for the song, directed by Bex Gunther, was released on 11 June 2024 on BigMama's YouTube channel. It was filmed in Albenga.

== Charts ==
Chart performance for "La rabbia non ti basta"
Chart (2024)	Peak position
Italy (FIMI)	25
Italy Airplay (EarOne)	55

== Certifications ==
Region	Certification	Certified units/sales
Italy (FIMI)	Gold	50,000^{‡}
^{‡} Sales+streaming figures based on certification alone.
