= Amore puro =

Studio album by Alessandra Amoroso
- Released: September 24, 2013
- Recorded: 2012–2013
- Genre: Pop; R&B; soul
- Length: 42:27
- Label: Sony Music Italy
- Producer: Tiziano Ferro; Michele Canova

Alessandra Amoroso chronology
Il mondo in un secondo (2010)	Amore puro (2013)	Alessandra Amoroso (2015)

Singles from Amore puro
- 1. "Amore puro" Released: August 30, 2013; 2. "Fuoco d'artificio" Released: November 15, 2013; 3. "Non devi perdermi" Released: March 7, 2014; 4. "Bellezza incanto e nostalgia" Released: June 27, 2014; 5. "L'hai dedicato a me" Released: October 24, 2014

Amore puro is the third studio album by Italian singer Alessandra Amoroso, released by Sony Music Italy on September 24, 2013.

The album featured several collaborations in productions and songwriting, including Tiziano Ferro, Biagio Antonacci and Emeli Sandé. The album peaked at number one on the Italian Albums Chart, becoming the first Italian artist to have all her first four recording project debuting at one, including Amoroso's debut EP Stupida. In 2014 the album was certified double platinum by FIMI.

== Background and composition ==
After her 2010 second studio album Il mondo in un secondo, Amoroso started working on the new record project with a new production team held by Tiziano Ferro and Michele Canova. The album featured eleventh tracks, with several songwriters and composers, including Amoroso herself in the opening track, Tiziano Ferro, Emeli Sandé, Biagio Antonacci, Audra Mae and Jon Bellion. In an interview with La Repubblica, Amoroso explained the artistic direction of the album and her work with Ferro:

"At first I wondered if I could sing the songs of a great performer like Titian Ferro. Then it went well, he helped me change my vocality by making me discover nuances that I didn't even know I had. I always sang with very high notes, constantly choked on the high notes, with Ferro I discovered intimate and deep tones. Even the spoken word. And that was a great growth. The sounds on the record are lower, without losing sight of the more rhythmic songs."

== Critic reception ==
Mattia Marzi of Rockol reported that Ferro's "characteristic traits can be found in the album, from the vocabulary to the use of verbs, even in the way Alessandra interprets the songs," appreciating the songs by Sandé and Antonacci. However, Marzi wrote that there is a perceived "lack of a common thread that binds the songs together" and a "lack of homogeneity" in the quality of the production, believing however that the artist has taken "a step forward" finding her " more personal and mature than her predecessors" and "one of the most valid pop interpreters on the Italian music scene."

== Track listing ==
Amore puro track listing
No.	Title	Lyrics	Music	Producer(s)	Length
1.	"Da casa mia"	Alessandra Amoroso; Tiziano Ferro	Niclas Kings; Paddy Dalton	Ferro; Michele Canova	3:52
2.	"Amore puro"	Ferro	Ferro	Ferro; Canova	4:27
3.	"Fuoco d'artificio"	Ferro	Adele Emili Sandé; Chris Crowhurst	Ferro; Canova	4:01
4.	"Starò meglio"	Ferro	Wayne Hector; Steve Robson; Edwina Jhonson	Ferro; Canova	3:51
5.	"Difendimi per sempre"	Ferro	Ferro; Davide Tagliapietra	Ferro; Canova	4:09
6.	"Bellezza, incanto e nostalgia"	Ferro	Ferro	Ferro; Canova	3:59
7.	"L'hai dedicato a me"	Ferro	Ferro	Ferro; Canova	3:35
8.	"Non devi perdermi"	Biagio Antonacci	Antonacci	Ferro; Canova	3:20
9.	"Non sarà un arrivederci"	Federica Camba; Daniele Coro	Camba; Coro	Ferro; Canova	3:49
10.	"Hell or High Water"	Rob Kleiner; Audra Mae; Jon Bellion	Kleiner; Mae; Bellion	Ferro; Canova	3:37
11.	"La vita che vorrei"	Ferro	Gerard O’Connell; Natalia Hajjara; Johannes Jørgensen	Ferro; Canova	3:47
Total length:					42:27

== Charts ==
Chart performance for Amore puro
Chart (2016)	Peak position
Italian Albums (FIMI)	1
Swiss Albums (Schweizer Hitparade)	40

=== Year-end charts ===
Year-end chart performance for Amore puro
Chart (2013)	Position
Italian Albums (FIMI)	16
Chart (2014)	Position
Italian Albums (FIMI)	28

== Certifications ==
Certifications for Amore puro
Region	Certification	Certified units/sales
Italy (FIMI)	2× Platinum	100,000^{*}
^{*} Sales figures based on certification alone.
