= Io non sarei =

Studio album by Alessandra Amoroso
- Released: 13 June 2025
- Genre: Pop
- Length: 34:36
- Label: Epic
- Producer: Carlo Avarello; Pietro Celona; Gorbaciof; ITACA; Fenoaltea; Simone Guzzino; Merk & Kremont; d.whale; Takagi & Ketra; Tananai; Zef

Alessandra Amoroso chronology
Tutto accade (2021)	Io non sarei (2025)

Singles from Io non sarei
- 1. "Fino a qui" Released: 7 February 2024; 2. "Mezzo rotto" Released: 31 May 2024; 3. "Si mette male" Released: 1 November 2024; 4. "Rimani rimani rimani" Released: 20 December 2024; 5. "Cose stupide" Released: 4 April 2025; 6. "Serenata" Released: 30 May 2025

Io non sarei (transl. I wouldn't be) is the eighth studio album by Italian singer Alessandra Amoroso, released on 13 June 2025 by Epic.

== Description ==
Following the release of her seventh studio album, Tutto accade, in 2021, and the promotional tour, Tutto accade tour, in 2022, Amoroso took a recording break. In 2024, she participated in the Sanremo Music Festival for the first time with the song Fino a qui, explaining that she had withdrawn from public life following media pillorying and a hate campaign against her following incidents that occurred a few weeks after the concert held at the Giuseppe Meazza Stadium in Milan, Tutto succede a San Siro in 2022.

The album is composed of eleven tracks with the participation in the writing of the singer herself, Federica Abbate, Alessandro La Cava, Davide Petrella, Jacopo Ettorre, Alessandro Raina and Tananai, as well as the collaboration of BigMama and Serena Brancale. In an interview given to Billboard Italia the singer talked about the production process and the meaning of the project:

The process was a sort of continuous flow, a relentless practice of writing, which I let myself be carried away by. Each time I learned something new from the various collaborators and artists who were at my side. This is the album of completeness. Both on an artistic level, in the sense that I fully identify with what I write and sing, and on a personal level, as a woman.

== Reception ==
Paolo Panzeri of Rockol states that the album's tracks are "in pure Amoroso style, embracing the sounds of modern pop while also embracing more intimate and soulful sounds," highlighting "the musical and human candor that has always distinguished her," noting that they are nothing new in the artist's discography.

Paolo Aruffo of Today describes the project as "enjoyable overall" and with a soulful sound, noting that the singer "has finally shed a heavy layer that wasn't hers" from previous projects, but finding a limitation in offering only five new songs compared to the singles.

== Promotion ==
On 11 June 2025, two days before the album's release, the singer performed a sold-out concert at the Baths of Caracalla in Rome, showcasing some songs from the new project. The show was later broadcast on Canale 5 on 4 September 2025, under the title Alessandra Amoroso - Io non vorrei. From June to August 2025, Amoroso embarked on the promotional tour, Fino a qui Summer tour 2025.

== Track listing ==
Io non sarei track listing
No.	Title	Lyrics	Music	Producer(s)	Length
1.	"Cose stupide"	Daniele Fossatelli; Leonardo Zaccaria; Pietro Celona	Fossatelli; Zaccaria; Pietro Celona	Celo	2:54
2.	"Serenata" (with Serena Brancale)	Serena Brancale; Alessandra Amoroso; Alessandro La Cava; Federica Abbate	Eugenio Maimone; Federico Mercuri; Giordano Cremona	Carlo Avarello; Gorbaciof; ITACA	3:08
3.	"Tutto a posto"	Amoroso; Davide Petrella	Gabriel Rossi; Lorenzo Santarelli; Marco Salvaderi	ROOM9	3:16
4.	"Io non sarei"	Amoroso; Jacopo Ettorre	La Cava; Stefano Tognini	Zef	3:02
5.	"Mezzo rotto" (featuring BigMama)	Petrella; Marianna Mammone	Petrella; Tognini	Zef	3:15
6.	"Rimani rimani rimani"	Alfredo Rapetti; Fabrizio Fusaro; Simone Guzzino	Rapetti; Fusaro; Guzzino	Fenoaltea; Guzzino; Zef	2:37
7.	"Per sempre ancora"	Antonio Caputo; Leonardo Zaccaria; Vincenzo Colella	Caputo; Zaccaria; Colella; Emanuele Cotto	Etta	3:05
8.	"Mettimi alla prova"	Daniele Magro; Antonio Maiello	Riccardo Scirè	Scirè; Zef	3:04
9.	"Si mette male"	Alberto Cotta Ramusino; Alessandro Raina	Davide Simonetta; Enrico Wolfgang Leonardo Cavion	Tananai; d.whale	3:13
10.	"So che non lo sapevi (aria)"	Magro; Rapetti	Michael Tenisci	Tenisci; Zef	3:10
11.	"Fino a qui"	Amoroso; Abbate; Ettorre	Abbate; Ettorre; Alessandro Merli; Fabio Clemente; Pierfrancesco Pasini	Takagi & Ketra	3:52
Total length:					34:36

== Charts ==
=== Weekly charts ===
Weekly chart performance for Io non sarei
Chart (2025)	Peak position
Italian Albums (FIMI)	1

=== Year-end charts ===
Year-end chart performance for Io non sarei
Chart	Year	Position
Italian Albums (FIMI)	2025	50

== Certifications ==
Certifications for Io non sarei
Region	Certification	Certified units/sales
Italy (FIMI)	Gold	25,000^{‡}
^{‡} Sales+streaming figures based on certification alone.
