= Vivere a colori =

Studio album by Alessandra Amoroso
- Released: January 15, 2016
- Recorded: 2015
- Genre: Dance pop
- Length: 51:46
- Label: Sony Music Italy
- Producer: Andrea Rigonat; Michele Canova; Fabrizio Ferraguzzo; Roberto Cardelli

Alessandra Amoroso chronology
Alessandra Amoroso (2015)	Vivere a colori (2016)	10 (2018)

Singles from Vivere a colori
- 1. "Stupendo fino a qui" Released: November 15, 2015; 2. "Comunque andare" Released: February 26, 2016; 3. "Vivere a colori" Released: June 17, 2016; 4. "Sul ciglio senza far rumore" Released: September 16, 2016; 5. "Fidati ancora di me" Released: March 17, 2017

Vivere a colori is the fifth studio album by Italian singer Alessandra Amoroso, released by Sony Music Italy on January 15, 2016.

The album received positive reviews from music critics, who appreciated the change in music and themes addressed in the songs. Commercially, it debuted at the top position on the FIMI Albums Chart, making the singer the first ever in the history of the chart to occupy the top position with her first five albums.

== Background and composition ==
After the 2015 Spanish language self-titled studio album for Spain and Latin America, Amoroso recorded Vivere a colori. The album is composed of fourteen tracks, produced by Andrea Rigonat, Fabrizio Ferraguzzo, Roberto Cardelli and Michele Canova, with pop and dance pop sounds. The song were written by several artists including Elisa, Tiziano Ferro, Dario Faini, Federica Abbate and Roberto Casalino.

== Critics reception ==
Alessandro Alicandri of Panorama wrote that the album "creates a portrait that looks so much like" the singer, in which "there is all her past in a less extreme key and a new present that transfers a sense of captivating energy." with sounds that give "freshness and dynamism".

Cristian Scarpone of All Music Italia wrote that Vivere a colori is "the breakthrough that so many expected and that surprises", appreciating Elisa's contribution as a songwriter, who produces two "pop-dance" songs to "make Alessandra sing with joy and finally get the speakers tapping in her discography as well."

== Track listing ==
Vivere a colori track listing
No.	Title	Lyrics	Music	Producer(s)	Length
1.	"Stupendo fino a qui"	Federica Camba; Daniele Coro	Camba; Coro	Andrea Rigonat	3:48
2.	"La vita in un anno"	Tiziano Ferro	Michael Tenisci	Michele Canova	3:27
3.	"Avrò cura di tutto"	Daniele Magro	Magro	Roberto Cardelli; Fabrizio Ferraguzzo	3:39
4.	"Vivere a colori"	Elisa Toffoli	Toffoli	Rigonat	4:19
5.	"L'unica cosa da fare"	Camba; Coro	Camba; Coro	Rigonat	3:50
6.	"Comunque andare"	Alessandra Amoroso; Toffoli	Toffoli	Rigonat	3:38
7.	"Mi porti via da me"	Andrea Amati; Valerio Carboni	Amati; Carboni	Canova	3:53
8.	"Sul ciglio senza far rumore"	Roberto Casalino	Dario Faini	Cardelli; Ferraguzzo	3:16
9.	"Appartenente"	Camba; Coro	Camba; Coro	Rigonat	3:59
10.	"Se il mondo ha il nostro volto"	Casalino	Faini	Canova	3:37
11.	"Nel tuo disordine"	Federico Zampaglione	Zampaglione	Canova	4:04
12.	"Fidati ancora di me"	Magro	Magro	Cardelli; Ferraguzzo	3:48
13.	"Non sarà mai"	Camba; Coro	Camba; Coro	Rigonat	3:18
14.	"Il mio stato di felicità"	Alfredo Rapetti; Federica Abbate; Faini	Rapetti; Abbate; Faini	Canova	3:28
Total length:					51:46

== Commercial performance ==
Vivere a colori debuted at number one on the Italian Albums Chart, becoming Amoroso's fourth consecutive album to achieve it and the first artist to have her first fifth albums all debut at number one on the Italian Chart, considering also the EP Stupida. It also became the best-selling female album in Italy and the fifth overall in 2016.

== Charts ==
Chart performance for Vivere a colori
Chart (2016)	Peak position
Italian Albums (FIMI)	1
Swiss Albums (Schweizer Hitparade)	22

=== Year-end charts ===
Year-end chart performance for Vivere a colori
Chart (2016)	Position
Italian Albums (FIMI)	5
Chart (2017)	Position
Italian Albums (FIMI)	45

== Certifications ==
Certifications for Vivere a colori
Region	Certification	Certified units/sales
Italy (FIMI)	3× Platinum	150,000^{‡}
^{‡} Sales+streaming figures based on certification alone.
