= Find a Way (Alessandra Amoroso song) =

Single by Alessandra Amoroso

Single by Alessandra Amoroso

from the album Scialla
- Released: 15 January 2009
- Recorded: 2009
- Genre: Pop
- Length: 3:28
- Label: Sony BMG
- Songwriters: A Argyle, I Osmand

Alessandra Amoroso singles chronology
| "Find a Way" (2009) | "Immobile" (2009) |

"Find a Way" is the debut single by Alessandra Amoroso. It is the only English-language song from Amoroso.

== Track listing ==
Digital download/Standard

1. "Find a Way" – 03:28

== Charts ==
FIMI ITA singoli chart
| Week | 01 | 02 | 03 | 04 |
|---|---|---|---|---|
| Position | 6 | 4 | 11 | 17 |

Musica e dischi singles chart
| Week | 01 | 02 |
|---|---|---|
| Position | 22 | 37 |
