= Tutto accade =

Studio album by Alessandra Amoroso
- Released: 22 October 2021
- Genre: Pop
- Length: 47:40
- Label: Epic; Sony Music Italy
- Producer: Dardust; d.whale; Takagi & Ketra; Francesco "Katoo" Catitti; Selton; Fabio Gargiulo; Zef

Alessandra Amoroso chronology
10 (2018)	Tutto accade (2021)	Io non sarei (2025)

Singles from Tutto accade
- 1. "Piuma" Released: 7 April 2021; 2. "Sorriso grande" Released: 8 April 2021; 3. "Tutte le volte" Released: 3 September 2021; 4. "Canzone inutile" Released: 12 November 2021; 5. "Camera 209" Released: 16 May 2022; 6. "Notti blu" Released: 11 November 2022

Tutto accade is the seventh studio album by Italian singer Alessandra Amoroso, released by Epic Records on 22 October 2021.

The album was promoted by several singles, including "Sorriso grande" and "Camera 209". It peaked at number two on the Italian Albums Chart, becoming the first of the artist not peaking at one; it was certified platinum by FIMI.

== Composition ==
The record involved the singer collaborating in the writing and composition of the songs alongside several songwriters and producers, including Dario Faini, Davide Petrella, Roberto Casalino, Federica Abbate, Giordana Angi, Rocco Hunt and Takagi & Ketra. In an Interview with La Repubblica Amoroso work behind the record project and its production:

"I tried to side with people who were part of my path but also part of my life. And then there were people who came in along the way but left something in me, with whom I was pleased with the idea of being able to share a piece of life: a prime example is Davide Petrella, at least for a couple of years now. [...] This record starts from a precise moment of transition and change in my personal life, and it was nice for me to be able to tell the story and be able to share it through music. [...] In this record there are songs that came before certain things happened in my life, often anticipated them, a kind of magic. The music in short was already speaking to me. In choosing each song I relied on my intuition, my instinct and my emotions, then when I listened to the record again I was amazed at how each song was in the right place at the right time, a connection between me and the music manifested itself that I never had before"

== Track listing ==
Tutto accade – Standard track listing
No.	Title	Lyrics	Music	Producer(s)	Length
1.	"Sorriso grande"	Davide Petrella	Dario Faini	Dardust	3:29
2.	"AleAleAle"	Paolo Antonacci	Faini	Dardust	3:27
3.	"Canzone inutile"	Rocco Pagliarulo; Federica Abbate; Alfredo Rapetti	Pagliarulo; Abbate; Rapetti; Alessandro Merli; Fabio Clemente	Dorado Inc.; Katoo	3:54
4.	"Piuma"	Alessandra Amoroso; Petrella	Francesco Catitti	Katoo	3:49
5.	"Il bisogno che ho di te"	Antonacci	Faini	Dardust	3:21
6.	"Un senso ed un compenso"	Roberto Casalino; Davide Simonetta	Casalino; Simonetta	d.whale	3:23
7.	"Che sapore ha"	Federico Zampaglione	Zampaglione	Dorado Inc.; Selton	3:20
8.	"Ti vedo da fuori"	Virginio Simonelli; Federica Camba; Daniele Coro	Simonelli; Camba; Coro	Dorado Inc.	3:16
9.	"Un'impressione"	Casalino; Simonetta	Casalino; Simonetta	d.whale	3:21
10.	"Tutte le volte"	Petrella	Catitti	Katoo	2:57
11.	"Una strada per l'allegria"	Daniele Magro	Magro	Dorado Inc.	3:13
12.	"Il nostro tempo"	Giordana Angi; Antonio Iammarino	Angi; Iammarino	Dorado Inc.	3:33
13.	"Tutte le cose che io so"	Amoroso; Abbate; Rapetti; Fabio Gargiulo	Abbate; Rapetti; Gargiulo	Gargiulo	3:33
14.	"Tutto accade"	Abbate; Rapetti	Abbate; Rapetti; Faini; Merli; Clemente	Takagi & Ketra	3:28
Total length:					47:40

Tutto accade – Digital reissue bonus tracks
No.	Title	Lyrics	Music	Producer(s)	Length
1.	"Camera 209" (featuring DB Boulevard)	Petrella; Monica Bragato	Laurent Brancowitz; Thomas Croquet; Frédéric Moulin; Thomas Mars; Deck D'Arcy; Stefano Tognini	Zef	2:58
2.	"Notti blu"	Petrella	Tognini	Zef	3:34
Total length:					53:32

== Charts ==
Chart performance for Tutto accade
Chart (2021)	Peak position
Italian Albums (FIMI)	2
Swiss Albums (Schweizer Hitparade)	55

=== Year-end charts ===
Year-end chart performance for Tutto accade
Chart (2021)	Position
Italian Albums (FIMI)	55

== Certifications ==
Certifications for Tutto accade
Region	Certification	Certified units/sales
Italy (FIMI)	Platinum	50,000^{‡}
^{‡} Sales+streaming figures based on certification alone.
