= Senza nuvole (song) =

Single by Alessandra Amoroso

from the album Senza nuvole
- Released: October 16, 2009
- Recorded: 2009
- Genre: Pop soul
- Length: 3:43
- Label: Sony BMG
- Songwriters: Federica Camba; Daniele Coro
- Producer: Simone Papi

Alessandra Amoroso singles chronology
"Estranei a partire da ieri" (2009)	"Senza nuvole" (2009)	"Mi sei venuto a cercare tu" (2010)

"Senza nuvole" is a song recorded by Italian singer Alessandra Amoroso. It was released on 16 October 2009 by Sony Music Italy as the second single from her debut studio album Senza nuvole.

== Track listing ==
Digital download/Standard

1. "Senza nuvole" – 03:43

== The song ==
Screenshot from the videoclip of the song.

The song is made available for digital download and radio airplay from October 16, 2009. Alessandra sang for the first time this song during the concert at the Limelight in Milan on October 8, while on October 10 she performed with this song at Amici di Maria De Filippi.

=== The music video ===
The video was produced by Pat Brown and includes scenes in which Alessandra sings and scenes from the film Amore 14, film in which Senza nuvole is the soundtrack.

== Charts ==
Chart	Peak position
Italian FIMI Singles Chart	6

=== Year-end charts ===
Chart (2009)	Position
Italian Singles Chart	48
