= Mezzo rotto =

Single by Alessandra Amoroso featuring BigMama

from the album Io non sarei
- Released: 31 May 2024
- Genre: Dance-pop
- Length: 3:15
- Label: Epic
- Songwriters: Davide Petrella; Marianna Mammone; Stefano Tognini
- Producers: Davide Petrella; Zef

Alessandra Amoroso singles chronology
"Fino a qui" (2024)	"Mezzo rotto" (2024)	"Si mette male" (2024)

BigMama singles chronology
"Cento occhi" (2024)	"Mezzo rotto" (2024)	"Il linguaggio del corpo" (2024)

Music video
- "Mezzo rotto" on YouTube

"Mezzo rotto" (transl. "Half broken") is a song recorded by Italian singer Alessandra Amoroso with featured vocals by Italian rapper BigMama. It was released on 31 May 2024 through Epic as the second single from Amoroso's eighth studio album, Io non sarei.

The song peaked at number six on the Italian singles chart, becoming Amoroso eleventh and BigMama first song to achieve it. It was certified platinum by FIMI.

== Background and composition ==
The song is written by Zef, Davide Petrella and the singer BigMama, with dance-pop music sounds. In an interview with Cosmopolitan Italia Amoroso told that the idea of collaborate on a song with BigMama came after the two artists' performance during the charity event Una.Nessuna.Centomila at the Verona Arena in early May 2024; in the same interview BigMama explained the meaning of the song and the writing process:

"For me writing is the most beautiful thing of all, maybe just after performing live, but I don't know how to write love pieces, at least I thought that was a big limitation for me because love doesn't inspire me at all. I didn't know what to write so I got on the bed with Ludovica [the singer fiancée] and in total panic she was saying "think of something sad, make up that we broke up!". and I was replying, "But I only know how to write real things, not make them up!" Then I thought of when we are far apart, her in Carrara, me in my home, "That sea you look at, me listening to pieces to remember you." Again I only told the truth."

== Critics reception ==
The song was praised by music critics, who called it an Italian summer hit of 2024.

Vincenzo Nasto of Fanpage.it stated that the song features "clear dance sounds" whose lyrics "indulge in the details of the summer passion experienced by the two women." Francesca D'Angelo of Elle Italia, writes that the song is reminiscent of Gabry Ponte, stating that "the voices of Alessandra Amoroso and Bigmama blend well, each maintaining their own personality", who sing a "very easy and catchy lyric".

All Music Italia associate the sounds to L'amour toujours by Gigi D'Agostino, appreciating the collaboration and that "Amoroso is able to deliver sweetness with the depth of a timbre that is always recognisable and never predictable". Cristina Mariani of Quotidiano Nazionale also associated the sounds with D'Agostino, finding it a successful collaboration thanks to the "pounding" sound and the "dance background".

== Music video ==
The music video for the song, directed by Byron Rosero, was released on 11 June 2024, through Amoroso's YouTube channel.

== Charts ==
=== Weekly charts ===
Weekly chart performance for "Mezzo rotto"
Chart (2024)	Peak position
Italy (FIMI)	6
Italy Airplay (EarOne)	9
Lithuania Airplay (TopHit)	54
Poland (Polish Airplay Top 100)	5
Poland (Polish Streaming Top 100)	51
San Marino (SMRRTV Top 50)	6

=== Monthly charts ===
Monthly chart performance for "Mezzo rotto"
Chart (2024)	Peak position
Lithuania Airplay (TopHit)	73

=== Year-end charts ===
Year-end chart performance for "Mezzo rotto"
Chart (2024)	Position
Italy (FIMI)	31
Poland (Polish Airplay Top 100)	44

== Certifications ==
Certifications for "Mezzo rotto"
Region	Certification	Certified units/sales
Italy (FIMI)	2× Platinum	200,000^{‡}
Poland (ZPAV)	Platinum	50,000^{‡}
^{‡} Sales+streaming figures based on certification alone.
