= Mi sei venuto a cercare tu =

Single by Alessandra Amoroso

from the album Senza nuvole
- Released: January 22, 2010
- Recorded: 2009, Stemma Studio (Rome)
- Genre: Pop
- Length: 4:05
- Label: Sony BMG
- Songwriters: Diego Calvetti; Marco Ciappelli
- Producer: Adriano Pennino

Alessandra Amoroso singles chronology
"Senza nuvole" (2009)	"Mi sei venuto a cercare tu" (2010)	"Arrivi tu" (2010)

"Mi sei venuto a cercare tu" (English: 'You came looking for me') is a song recorded by Italian singer Alessandra Amoroso. It was released by Sony Music Italy on 22 January 2010 as the third single from her debut studio album Senza nuvole.

== Track listing ==
Digital download

No.	Title	Writer(s)	Length
1.	"Mi sei venuto a cercare tu"	Diego Calvetti e Marco Ciappelli	04:05

"Mi sei venuto a cercare tu" was written by Diego Calvetti and Marco Ciappelli and produced by Adriano Pennino. It is the first single by Alessandra Amoroso which wasn't written by Federica Camba and Daniele Coro, authors of the first four singles by the singer. The song premiered live on 8 October 2009 at the Limelight in Milan. The song was released as the third single on January 22, 2010, coinciding with the beginning of the Senza Nuvole tour. The song is a ballad characterized by a Spanish-guitar and bass in the verses, and a high pitched chorus.
