= 10 (Alessandra Amoroso album) =

Studio album by Alessandra Amoroso
- Released: 5 October 2018
- Genre: Pop
- Length: 49:00
- Label: Columbia
- Producers: Dardust; Andrea Rigonat; Daddy's Groove; Fabrizio Ferraguzzo; Stefano Settepani

Alessandra Amoroso chronology
Vivere a colori (2016)	10 (2018)	Tutto accade (2021)

Singles from 10
- 1. "La stessa" Released: 12 August 2018; 2. "Trova un modo" Released: 5 October 2018; 3. "Dalla tua parte" Released: 4 January 2019; 4. "Forza e coraggio" Released: 29 March 2019

10 is the sixth studio album by Italian singer Alessandra Amoroso, released on 5 October 2018 by Columbia Records.

== Description ==
The title indicates the singer's career and consists of fourteen tracks. The album features collaborations with several songwriters, including Federica Abbate, Cheope, Dario Faini, Paolo Antonacci, Federica Camba, Daniele Coro, Daniele Magro and Tony Maiello.

Interviewed by la Repubblica, the singer said:

These are 10 important years, because they aren't just mine, but also those of the people who grew up with me. [...] Describing a new side of myself, a new awareness, I'm a woman now; [...] finding a new kind of writing and music that could offer something new and fresh. [...] I went in search of different authors, who started the journey with me and came back. Experimenting, but without changing who I am.

The album is also dedicated to her fan club, the Big Family, for having supported her since the beginning of her career, which began with her participation on the talent show Amici di Maria De Filippi.

== Promotion ==
On 12 August 2018, Amoroso released the lead single from the album, "La stessa". On 5 October the second single, "Trova un modo", was released, coinciding with the album's release; on the same day, she also announced her 10 Tour.

On 4 January 2019 the third single, "Dalla tua parte" was released, followed by "Forza e coraggio" on 29 March.

== Track listing ==
10 track listing
No.	Title	Lyrics	Music	Length
1.	"La stessa"	Paolo Antonacci	Dario Faini	3:46
2.	"Dalla tua parte"	Alfredo Rapetti; Federica Abbate; Faini	Rapetti; Abbate; Faini	3:46
3.	"Forse a domani"	Federica Camba; Daniele Coro; Daniele Magro	Camba; Coro; Magro	3:48
4.	"Forza e coraggio"	Magro	Magro	3:31
5.	"La gente non sei tu"	Daniele Incicco; Roberto Casalino	Incicci; Casalino; Faini	3:51
6.	"Trova un modo"	Casalino	Casalino; Faini	3:47
7.	"Cadere piano"	Antonio Maiello; Enrico Palmosi; Sabatino Salvati	Maiello; Palmosi; Salvati	3:38
8.	"Simmetria dei desideri"	Abbate; Rapetti	Abbate; Rapetti	3:15
9.	"Declinami l'amore"	Casalino; Davide Simonetta	Simonetta	3:19
10.	"Parlare perdonare baciare"	Magro	Magro	3:38
11.	"Buongiorno"	Magro	Magro	3:06
12.	"Parola chiave"	Camba; Coro	Camba; Coro	3:18
13.	"Ogni santissimo giorno"	Alessandra Amoroso; Magro	Amoroso; Magro	3:18
14.	"In me il tuo ricordo"	Abbate; Rapetti; Fabio Gargiulo	Abbate; Rapetti; Gargiulo	3:42
Total length:				49:00

== Charts ==
=== Weekly charts ===
Weekly chart performance for 10
Chart (2024)	Peak position
Italian Albums (FIMI)	1
Swiss Albums (Schweizer Hitparade)	18

=== Year-end charts ===
Year-end chart performance for 10
Chart	Year	Position
Italian Albums (FIMI)	2018	13
Italian Albums (FIMI)	2019	72

== Certifications ==
Certifications for 10
Region	Certification	Certified units/sales
Italy (FIMI)	2× Platinum	100,000^{‡}
^{‡} Sales+streaming figures based on certification alone.
