= Ali e radici =

Studio album by Eros Ramazzotti
- Released: 26 May 2009
- Recorded: 2008–2009
- Genre: Pop, rock
- Length: 42:34
- Label: Sony BMG Music Entertainment

Eros Ramazzotti chronology
e² (2007)	Ali e radici (2009)	21.00: Eros Live World Tour 2009/2010 (2010)

Singles from Ali e radici
- 1. "Parla con me" Released: 24 April 2009; 2. "Controvento" Released: 3 September 2009; 3. "Il cammino" Released: 4 December 2009; 4. "Bucaneve" Released: 12 March 2010

Ali e radici (Wings and Roots), also known by its Spanish name Alas y raíces, is a 2009 studio album by Italian singer-songwriter Eros Ramazzotti.

Four years after the issue of his last studio album and two years after his (best of) compilation album, Eros circulates his new studio album with the title "Ali e radici", which consists of eleven songs. His new album is available in a standard edition as well as in a deluxe edition (the latter includes 64-page booklet of photographs). Eros is the producer of the album with Claudio Guidetti. Michele Canova (who is Tiziano Ferro and Giusy Ferreri's producer) is the co-producer of the six songs of the album. Moreover, Michele Canova writes the music with Eros and Claudio Guidetti and the lyrics with Eros and Adelio Cogliati. The first single from the album is "Parla con me".

== Track listing ==
=== Ali e radici ===
No.	Title	Writer(s)	Length
1.	"Appunti e note"	Adelio Cogliati, Claudio Guidetti, Eros Ramazzotti	3:54
2.	"Il cammino"	Cogliati, Guidetti, Ramazzotti	3:46
3.	"Parla con me"	Cogliati, Guidetti, Ramazzotti	3:58
4.	"L'orizzonte"	Cogliati, Guidetti, Ramazzotti	3:46
5.	"Affetti personali"	Cogliati, Guidetti, Ramazzotti	3:30
6.	"Controvento"	Cogliati, Guidetti, Ramazzotti	3:45
7.	"Ali e radici"	Cogliati, Guidetti, Ramazzotti, Maurizio Fabrizio	4:17
8.	"Bucaneve"	Cogliati, Guidetti, Ramazzotti	4:10
9.	"Nessuno escluso"	Luca Chiaravalli, Cogliati, Ramazzotti, Simone Bertolotti	3:45
10.	"Non possiamo chiudere gli occhi"	Cogliati, Guidetti, Ramazzotti	3:49
11.	"Come gioielli"	Cogliati, Guidetti, Ramazzotti	3:54

iTunes Bonus Tracks
No.	Title	Writer(s)	Length
12.	"Linda e il mare"	Cogliati, Guidetti, Ramazzotti	4:01
13.	"Afectos personales"	Cogliati, Guidetti, Ramazzotti	3:31

=== Alas y raíces ===
No.	Title	Writer(s)	Length
1.	"Apuntes y notas"	Cogliati, Guidetti, Ramazzotti	3:54
2.	"El camino"	Cogliati, Guidetti, Ramazzotti	3:46
3.	"Dímelo a mí"	Cogliati, Guidetti, Ramazzotti	3:58
4.	"El horizonte"	Cogliati, Guidetti, Ramazzotti	3:46
5.	"Afectos personales"	Cogliati, Guidetti, Ramazzotti	3:30
6.	"Contra el viento"	Cogliati, Guidetti, Ramazzotti	3:45
7.	"Alas y raíces"	Cogliati, Guidetti, Ramazzotti, Fabrizio	4:17
8.	"Flor inesperada"	Cogliati, Guidetti, Ramazzotti	4:10
9.	"Nosotros incluidos"	Chiaravalle, Cogliati, Ramazzotti, Bertolotti	3:45
10.	"No podemos cerrar los ojos"	Cogliati, Guidetti, Ramazzotti	3:49
11.	"Como un tesoro"	Cogliati, Guidetti, Ramazzotti	3:54

iTunes Bonus Tracks
No.	Title	Writer(s)	Length
12.	"Linda y el mar"	Cogliati, Guidetti, Ramazzotti	4:01
13.	"Affetti personali"	Cogliati, Guidetti, Ramazzotti	3:33

== Charts ==
=== Weekly charts ===
Chart (2009)	Peak position
Austrian Albums (Ö3 Austria)	2
Belgian Albums (Ultratop Flanders)	6
Belgian Albums (Ultratop Wallonia)	3
Croatian Albums (HDU)	1
Danish Albums (Hitlisten)	4
Dutch Albums (Album Top 100)	2
Finnish Albums (Suomen virallinen lista)	13
French Albums (SNEP)	5
German Albums (Offizielle Top 100)	4
Hungarian Albums (MAHASZ)	2
Italian Albums (FIMI)	1
Italian Albums (FIMI) Alas y raices	66
Mexican Albums (AMPROFON)	17
Spanish Albums (PROMUSICAE) Alas y raices	2
Swedish Albums (Sverigetopplistan)	2
Swiss Albums (Schweizer Hitparade)	1
US Top Latin Albums (Billboard)	52
US Latin Pop Albums (Billboard)	13

=== Year-end charts ===
Chart (2009)	Position
Austrian Albums (Ö3 Austria)	48
Belgian Albums (Ultratop Flanders)	65
Belgian Albums (Ultratop Wallonia)	35
Dutch Albums (Album Top 100)	47
French Albums (SNEP)	108
German Albums (Offizielle Top 100)	74
Swedish Albums (Sverigetopplistan)	62
Swiss Albums (Schweizer Hitparade)	8

== Certifications ==
Region	Certification	Certified units/sales
Austria (IFPI Austria)	Gold	10,000^{*}
Belgium (BRMA)	Gold	15,000^{*}
Germany (BVMI)	Gold	100,000^{^}
Hungary (MAHASZ)	Platinum	6,000^{^}
Italy (FIMI)	5× Platinum	350,000^{*}
Spain (PROMUSICAE)	Gold	40,000^{^}
Sweden (GLF)	Gold	20,000^{^}
Switzerland (IFPI Switzerland)	Platinum	20,000^{^}
^{*} Sales figures based on certification alone.^{^} Shipments figures based on certification alone.

== Reception ==
- allmusic
