= Camera 209 =

Single by Alessandra Amoroso featuring DB Boulevard

from the album Tutto accade (digital edition)
- Released: 22 May 2022
- Genre: Dance pop
- Length: 2:58
- Label: Epic
- Songwriters: Davide Petrella; Monica Bragato; Laurent Brancowitz; Thomas Croquet; Frédéric Moulin; Thomas Mars; Deck D'Arcy; Stefano Tognini
- Producer: Zef

Alessandra Amoroso featuring DB Boulevard singles chronology
"Canzone inutile" (2021)	"Camera 209" (2022)	"Notti blu" (2022)

Music video
- "Camera 209" on YouTube

"Camera 209" is a song recorded by Italian singer Alessandra Amoroso featuring Italian music group DB Boulevard. It was released on 16 May 2022 through Epic Records as a single and included in the reissue of her seventh studio album Tutto accade.

== Composition ==
The song was produced by Zef, wid uptempo and dance-pop sounds. It sempled the single "Point of View" by Italian house-pop group DB Boulevard, who appear as featured artist on the track. Interviewed by Anna Pettinelli on Radio Dimensione Suono, the singer told about the single:

"I had already started writing for next music projects, but it came like thunder in the clear sky and I said, 'okay, let's do it, because to me this piece blows my mind.' To me it honestly just gives that mood of lightness that is not synonymous with superficiality. [...] It was Zef and Davide Petrella in a very particular moment, because I was looking for different sounds, they came with this piece."

== Critics reception ==
Alessandro Alicandri of TV Sorrisi e Canzoni stated that although it refers musically to the dance sounds of Point of View, "the song in its content and message is very current," calling it "a manifesto of a very precious lightness." La Repubblica wrote that "Camera 209" presents a "sustained rhythm with a dance flavor," finding in it "a hymn to independence and the ability to free ourselves from those mental schemes that prevent us from living every moment to the fullest."

== Music video ==
The music video for the song, directed by Bogdan "Chilldays" Plakov, was released on February 7, 2024, through the singer's YouTube channel. It was filmed in Formentera.

== Charts ==
Chart (2022)	Peak position
Italy (FIMI)	42
Italy Airplay (EarOne)	4
San Marino (SMRRTV Top 50)	15

== Certifications ==
Region	Certification	Certified units/sales
Italy (FIMI)	Platinum	100,000^{‡}
^{‡} Sales+streaming figures based on certification alone.
