= Karaoke (Boomdabash and Alessandra Amoroso song) =

Single by Boomdabash and Alessandra Amoroso

from the album Don't Worry (Best of 2005-2020)
- Language: Italian
- Released: 11 June 2020
- Genre: Reggae fusion; electropop
- Length: 2:36
- Label: Universal Music Group
- Songwriters: Federica Abbate; Rocco Pagliarulo; Alfredo Rapetti; Alessandro Merli; Fabio Clemente
- Producer: Takagi & Ketra

Boomdabash singles chronology
"Ti volevo dedicare" (2019)	"Karaoke" (2020)	"Don't Worry" (2020)

Alessandra Amoroso singles chronology
"Immobile 10+1" (2019)	"Karaoke" (2020)	"Pezzo di cuore" (2021)

Music video
- "Karaoke" on YouTube

"Karaoke" is a song by Italian group Boomdabash and Italian singer Alessandra Amoroso. It was released on 11 June 2020 through Universal Music Italy, as the lead single from the group greatest hits album Don't Worry (Best of 2005-2020).

The song peaked at number one on the Italia Singles Chart, becoming the best selling song ot 2020 in Italy. It also marked the artists second commaboration after "Mambo salentino" published in 2019.

== Background and composition ==
"Karaoke" is the second collaboration between Amoroso and Boomdabash after the single "Mambo salentino" published in 2019. The song was firstly written by Federica Abbate and Rocco Pagliarulo, and then produced and rewritten by Boomdabash.

In an interview with Il Fatto Quotidiano, Amoroso explained the meaning of the song and her decision to sing it:

"I thought about it for a week and fought to carry on "Karaoke." I said, "You know what? I feel like doing it and I did it." I felt like singing it because it gives me happiness, it makes me laugh, I loved it. [...] I couldn't have come out with another piece. They proposed things to me especially in line with a certain record project, but that was not my reasoning. I really needed to come up with something light, to get a simple, strong message across that could 'revive' people after the lockdown and give them emotions and energy. "Karaoke" was my lifeline. For Boomdabash then I have a crazy love and also for their families. We are like brothers, we know each other well."

== Music video ==
The music video, directed by Fabrizio Conte and choreographed by Veronica Peparini, was shot between the beach of San Pietro in Bevagna and Eremo di Vincent in Guagnano. It was published on June 24, 2020 through Boomdabash's YouTube channel.

== Commercial performance ==
After debuting at No. 3 on the Italia Singles Chart, "Karaoke" topped the chart for three consecutive weeks. It became Amoroso third number one song on the chart and Boomdabash's first one. At the end of 2020 "Karaoke" was the best-selling song of 2020 in Italy by FIMI. At the end of the year, it was also the third most played Italian song on the radio.

== Charts ==
=== Weekly charts ===
Chart (2020)	Peak position
Italy (FIMI)	1
Italy Airplay (EarOne)	1
Switzerland (Schweizer Hitparade)	44

=== Year-end charts ===
Chart (2020)	Position
Italy (FIMI)	1
Chart (2021)	Position
Italy (FIMI)	68

== Certifications ==
Region	Certification	Certified units/sales
Italy (FIMI)	6× Platinum	420,000^{‡}
^{‡} Sales+streaming figures based on certification alone.
