= Pezzo di cuore =

Single by Emma and Alessandra Amoroso
- Language: Italian
- Released: 15 January 2021
- Genre: Power ballad
- Length: 3:47
- Label: Polydor; Universal
- Songwriters: Davide Petrella; Dario Faini
- Producer: Dardust

Emma Marrone singles chronology
"C'hai ragione tu" (2020)	"Pezzo di cuore" (2021)	"Che sogno incredibile" (2021)

Alessandra Amoroso singles chronology
"Karaoke" (2020)	"Pezzo di cuore" (2021)	"Piuma" (2021)

Music video
- "Pezzo di cuore" on YouTube

"Pezzo di cuore" is a song recorded by Italian singers Emma and Alessandra Amoroso. It was written by Davide Petrella and composed by Dario Faini and produced by the latter. It was released by Universal Music Group and Polydor Records on 15 January 2021 and included in Emma's first compilation Best of Me.

"Pezzo di cuore" peaked at number 2 on the Italian FIMI Singles Chart and was certified platinum in Italy.

== Background ==
About the collaboration, the singers explained "we are friends, accomplices, raised in the same land and with the same values: we do not need to hide from each other". The song is "a dialogue between two women, two friends, with two paths and two different personalities but both always in search of the truth of their emotions. The song, in fact, precisely speaks of this: to find the right way to experience feelings in an authentic way, starting from one's love for oneself".

== Music video ==
The music video for the song was released on YouTube on 18 January 2021. It was realized in black & white and it was directed by Bendo.

== Live performances ==
Emma Marrone and Alessandra Amoroso performed the song live for the first time on 16 January 2021, during the weekly episode of Amici di Maria De Filippi. They also performed it during the fourth evening of Sanremo Music Festival 2021.

== Charts ==
Chart performance for "Pezzo di cuore"
Chart (2021)	Peak position
Italy (FIMI)	2
Italy Airplay (EarOne)	3
San Marino (SMRRTV Top 50)	22

== Certifications ==
Region	Certification	Certified units/sales
Italy (FIMI)	Platinum	70,000^{‡}
^{‡} Sales+streaming figures based on certification alone.
