= Sorriso grande =

Single by Alessandra Amoroso

from the album Tutto accade
- Released: 8 April 2021
- Genre: Pop
- Length: 3:52
- Label: Epic
- Songwriters: Davide Petrella; Dario Faini
- Producer: Dardust

Alessandra Amoroso singles chronology
"Piuma" (2021)	"Sorriso grande" (2021)	"Tutte le volte" (2021)

Music video
- "Sorriso grande" on YouTube

"Sorriso grande" (transl. "Big Smile") is a song recorded by Italian singer Alessandra Amoroso. It was released on 8 April 2021 through Epic Records as the second single for her seventh studio album Tutto accade.

== Composition ==
The track, written by Davide Petrella and produced by Dardust, describes a new positive transition in the singer's life following the COVID-19 pandemic. The lyrics are related to the previous single "Piuma", which describes the dark side of the lockdown. In an interview with Vanity Fair Italia singer described the meaning of the song:

"I love light, but I have learned that there is also darkness. I live with music, but I also listen to silence. I have learned not to fight sadness, darkness and fears, but to accept them and go through them. This awareness [sung in the single "Piuma"] leads to "Sorriso grande", a sunny, open song charged with a newfound energy that represents rebirth, the rediscovery of self in a new light, the image of a strong woman who knows who she is and what she wants and has found the courage to be herself."

== Music video ==
The music video was directed by YouNuts! and choreographed by Veronica Peparini, and featured actress Matilde Gioli. The video was shot in the same setting as "Piuma", an apartment that, if in the previous single appeared gray and claustrophobic, in "Sorriso grande" is colorful and gives space to the outdoors.

== Charts ==
Chart (2021)	Peak position
Italy (FIMI)	36
Italy Airplay (EarOne)	11
San Marino (SMRRTV Top 50)	15

== Certifications ==
Region	Certification	Certified units/sales
Italy (FIMI)	Platinum	70,000^{‡}
^{‡} Sales+streaming figures based on certification alone.
