= Il mondo in un secondo =

Studio album by Alessandra Amoroso
- Released: September 28, 2010
- Recorded: 2010
- Genre: Pop
- Length: 49:31
- Label: Sony Music Italy
- Producers: Dado Parisini; Simone Papi; Pino Perris; Chico Bennet; Richard Vission

Alessandra Amoroso chronology
Senza nuvole (2009)	Il mondo in un secondo (2010)	Amore puro (2013)

Singles from Il mondo in un secondo
- 1. "La mia storia con te" Released: September 1, 2010; 2. "Urlo e non mi senti" Released: November 19, 2010; 3. "Niente (Mientes)" Released: March 29, 2011; 4. "Dove sono i colori" Released: May 19, 2011

Il mondo in un secondo is the second studio album by Italian singer Alessandra Amoroso. It was released on July 15, 2010 through Sony Music Italy. The album consists of thirteen tracks recorded in the spring and summer 2010. It was certified quadruple platinum by the Federation of the Italian Music Industry.

== Track listing ==
Il mondo in un secondo – Standard track listing
No.	Title	Lyrics	Music	Length
1.	"La mia storia con te"	Saverio Grandi; Fabio Campedelli; Luca Angelosanti; Marco Ciappelli	Grandi; Campedelli; Angelosanti; Ciappelli	03:51
2.	"Niente (Mientes)"	Mario Domm; Mónica Vélèz; Giuseppe Rinaldi	Domm; Vélèz	03:25
3.	"Punto di domanda"	Antonio Galbiati	Dario Faini	03:41
4.	"Dove sono i colori"	Federica Camba; Daniele Coro	Camba; Coro	03:53
5.	"Urlo e non mi senti"	Francesco Silvestre	Enrico Zapparoli	03:28
6.	"Non ho che te"	Camba; Coro	Camba; Coro	03:29
7.	"Il mondo in un secondo"	Galbiati	Faini	03:35
8.	"Semplicemente così"	Galbiati	Faini	03:33
9.	"Romantica ossessione"	Camba; Coro	Camba; Coro	03:39
10.	"Domani con gli occhi di ieri"	Camba; Coro	Camba; Coro	03:43
11.	"Un fiore dal niente"	Camba; Coro	Camba; Coro	03:35
12.	"I'm a Woman"	Chico Bennett	Bennett; Richard Vission	02:56
13.	"Clip His Wings"	Bennett	Bennett	03:19
Total length:				49:38

Il mondo in un secondo – iTunes edition bonus track
No.	Title	Lyrics	Music	Length
14.	"Clip His Wings" (Moonlight version)	Bennett	Bennett	03:22

== Charts ==
Chart	Peak position
Italy Albums Chart FIMI	1
Swiss Albums Chart	28

=== Singles ===
Single	Chart	Position
La mia storia con te	Italian Singles Chart	2
Urlo e non mi senti	Italian Singles Chart	27
Niente	Italian Singles Chart	36 (Airplay)
Dove sono i colori	Italian Singles Chart	54 (Airplay)
