= La mia storia con te =

Single by Alessandra Amoroso

from the album Il mondo in un secondo
- Released: September 1, 2010
- Recorded: 2010
- Genre: Pop
- Length: 3:51
- Label: Epic
- Songwriters: Saverio Grandi; Fabio Campedelli; Luca Angelosanti; Marco Ciappelli
- Producer: Dado Parisini

Alessandra Amoroso singles chronology
"Arrivi tu" (2010)	"La mia storia con te" (2010)	"Urlo e non mi senti"

La mia storia con te is a song recorded by Italian singer Alessandra Amoroso. It was released on September 1, 2010 as the lead single from her second studio album Il mondo in un secondo.

== Track listing ==
Digital download

No.	Title	Writer(s)	Length
1.	"La mia storia con te"	Saverio Grandi, Fabio Campedelli, Luca Angelosanti e Marco Ciappelli	03:51

== The song ==
After the formalization of the publication of the second album by Alessandra Amoroso, Il mondo in un secondo, occurred on July 15, 2010, the official Facebook page of Alessandra Amoroso organized on August 27, 2010, an event through which, solving riddles, Alessandra Amoroso's fans have been able to discover the title of the single. On August 30, 2010 Sony BMG published digitally the cover of the single and announced the date of the release of La mia storia con te and Il mondo in un second. The song was released a preview on the official website of Alessandra Amoroso on August 31, 2010. For the occasion, the site's graphics was changed and several previously unpublished content were added. On September 1, 2010 the single was made available for digital download at iTunes, while on September 2, 2010 in all the others digital stores. From September 3, 2010 the song started being broadcast on radio. The theme of this ballad is a love relationship which is probably ending and the whole piece focuses on the reflections caused by the crisis of this love and the will to continue this love from the singer. The song was written by Saverio Grandi, Fabio Campedelli, Luca Angelosanti e Marco Ciappelli and produced by Dado Parisini.

== The music video ==
The shooting for the videoclip took place on August 31, 2010 in Barcelona, Spain. The video was first published on September 16, 2010 on Sky One. The video was produced by BlackMamba Productions and directed by Basile & Jansen.

== Charts ==
=== Weekly charts ===
Chart	Peak position
Italian FIMI Singles Chart	2

=== Year-end charts ===
Chart	Peak position
Italian FIMI Singles Chart	44
