= Stupida =

EP by Alessandra Amoroso
- Released: April 10, 2009
- Genres: Pop; soul
- Length: 25:33
- Label: Sony Music Italy
- Producer: Mario Lavezzi

Alessandra Amoroso chronology
Stupida (2009)	Senza nuvole (2009)

Singles from Stupida
- 1. "Immobile" Released: January 16, 2009; 2. "Stupida" Released: March 27, 2009

Stupida is the debut extended play by Italian singer Alessandra Amoroso. It was released on April 10, 2009, by Sony Music Italy. The EP includes the single "Immobile", performed by Amoroso during her participation at Amici di Maria De Filippi and the title track "Stupida".

The EP sold 35,000 copies on the first day after release. Within ten days it had reached platinum status by exceeding 70,000 units sold. On May 23, 2009, the EP sold 140,000 copies and was certified double platinum. By July 2012, it was certified triple platinum by the Federation of the Italian Music Industry.

== Track listing ==
Stupida track listing
No.	Title	Writer(s)	Length
1.	"Stupida"	Diego Calvetti; Federica Camba; Daniele Coro	3:36
2.	"Splendida follia"	Calvetti; Camba; Coro; Emiliano Cecere	3:45
3.	"Immobile"	Camba; Coro	3:21
4.	"È ora di te"	Camba; Coro	3:39
5.	"Stella incantevole"	Calvetti; Camba; Coro; Sergio Vinci	3:51
6.	"Da qui"	Calvetti; Camba; Coro; Cecere; Mauro Rosati	3:22
7.	"Per ora per un po'"	Roberto Casalino	3:40

== Charts ==
=== EP ===
Chart	Peak position
Italy Albums Chart FIMI	1

=== Singles ===
Single	Chart	Position
"Immobile"	Italians Single Chart	1
"Stupida"	Italians Single Chart	1

== Stupida Tour ==
Stupida Tour
- Tour by Alessandra Amoroso
- Location: Italy
- Associated album: Stupida
- Start date: April 12, 2009
- End date: September 22, 2009
- No. of shows: 36

Alessandra Amoroso concert chronology
- /; Stupida Tour; Senza Nuvole Live Tour

In the summer of 2009 Alessandra Amoroso performed at over fifty concerts in Italy and including the Amiche per l'Abruzzo benefit gala organized by Laura Pausini and the Wind Music Awards. She also took part in all rounds of the Amici di Maria De Filippi talent show and several stages of the Radio Norba Battiti Live Tour.

Personnel

Alessandra Amoroso - vocals

Setlist

The order and choice of songs varied from show to show and included:

1. Stupida
2. Immobile
3. Find a way
4. Stella incantevole
5. Splendida follia
6. Da qui
7. X ora, x un po'
8. Estranei a partire da ieri*
9. If I Ain't Got You (cover of Alicia Keys)
10. Respect (cover of Aretha Franklin)
11. Think (cover of Aretha Franklin)
12. Chasing Pavements (cover of Adele)
13. Almeno tu nell'universo (cover of Mia Martini)
14. True colors (cover of Cyndi Lauper)
15. Ancora ancora ancora (cover of Mina)
16. Rehab (cover of Amy Winehouse)
17. No one (cover of Alicia Keys)
18. Feeling Better (cover of Malika Ayane)
19. Rain on Your Parade (cover of Duffy)
20. Can't Take My Eyes off You (cover of Frankie Valli)
21. One (cover of U2)

* First sung on August 30 at Gallipoli.

Tour dates

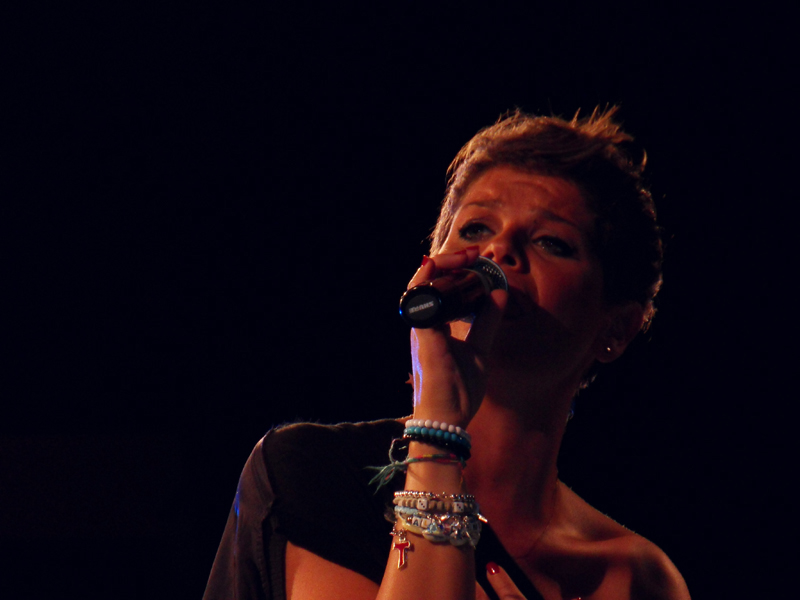
Alessandra Amoroso singing during a concert in Turin on September 11, 2009

Year	Month	Day	Show
2009	April	12	Lecce, Piazza Santo Oronzo
2009	June	20	Otranto, Piazza Castello
2009	June	23	Gallarate, Piazza Garibaldi
2009	June	28	Battipaglia, Piazza Amendola
2009	June	29	Tarquinia, Cittadella dei giovani
2009	July	10	Milan, Rha Bar
2009	July	11	Brescia, Autodromo Franciacorta
2009	July	13	Salerno, Parco del mercatello
2009	July	17	Sassari, Stadio Vanni Sanna
2009	July	28	San Gimignano, Stadio Santa Lucia
2009	July	30	Valmontone, Via della Pace
2009	August	3	San Pietro a Maida, Piazza largo Dante
2009	August	4	Viterbo, Teatro Romano di Ferento
2009	August	5	San Benedetto del Tronto, Piazza Bice Piacentini
2009	August	6	Sora, Campo sportivo
2009	August	11	Sant'Egidio del Monte Albino, Piazza Alfonso Pepe
2009	August	13	San Pietro Vernotico, Piazza del popolo
2009	August	14	Brindisi, Piazzale Lenio Fiacco
2009	August	15	Padua, Prato della valle
2009	August	16	Asiago, Piazza Carli
2009	August	17	Monte di Procida, Piazza XXVII Gennaio
2009	August	18	Sant'Agata di Puglia, Piazza Perillo
2009	August	19	Lecce, Stadio Vittorio Trepuzzi
2009	August	20	Reggio Calabria, Lungomare
2009	August	22	Molfetta, Parco Miragica
2009	August	22	Melpignano, Piazza del sole
2009	August	23	Paravati, Piazza largo Dante
2009	August	24	Alcamo, Stadio comunale Lelio Catella
2009	August	25	Lecce, Piazza Partigiani
2009	August	30	Gallipoli, Discoteca Praja
2009	August	31	Martina Franca, Stadio comunale Tursi
2009	September	4	Almarena, Parcheggio via Alvarez
2009	September	5	Comiziano, Piazza San Severino
2009	September	6	Reggio Emilia, Piazza Vittoria
2009	September	11	Turin, Palaruffini
2009	September	22	Lusciano, Piazza Vittoria
