= BigMama =

Italian rapper (born 2000)

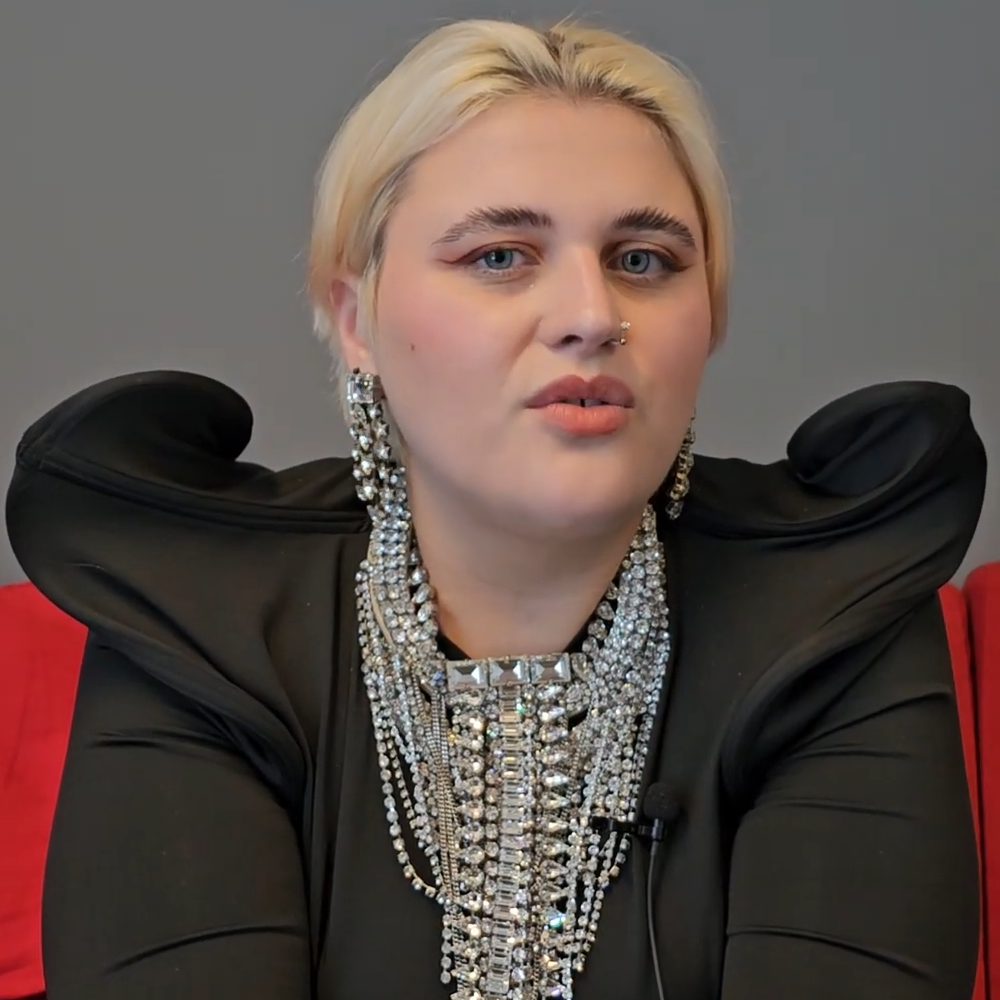
- BigMama in 2024

Background information
- Born: Marianna Mammone; 10 March 2000 (age 26); San Michele di Serino, Avellino, Italy
- Genres: Hip hop; pop rap
- Occupations: Rapper; singer; songwriter
- Instrument: Vocals
- Years active: 2016–present

Marianna Mammone (born 10 March 2000), known professionally as BigMama, is an Italian rapper, singer, and songwriter. She was a contestant on the Sanremo Music Festival 2024 and co-commentated the Italian broadcasts of the Eurovision Song Contest 2025.

== Early life ==
Marianna Mammone was born in San Michele di Serino, Avellino. She has three brothers. She graduated from a liceo scientifico and moved to Milan in 2018 to study urban planning at the Polytechnic University.

== Career ==
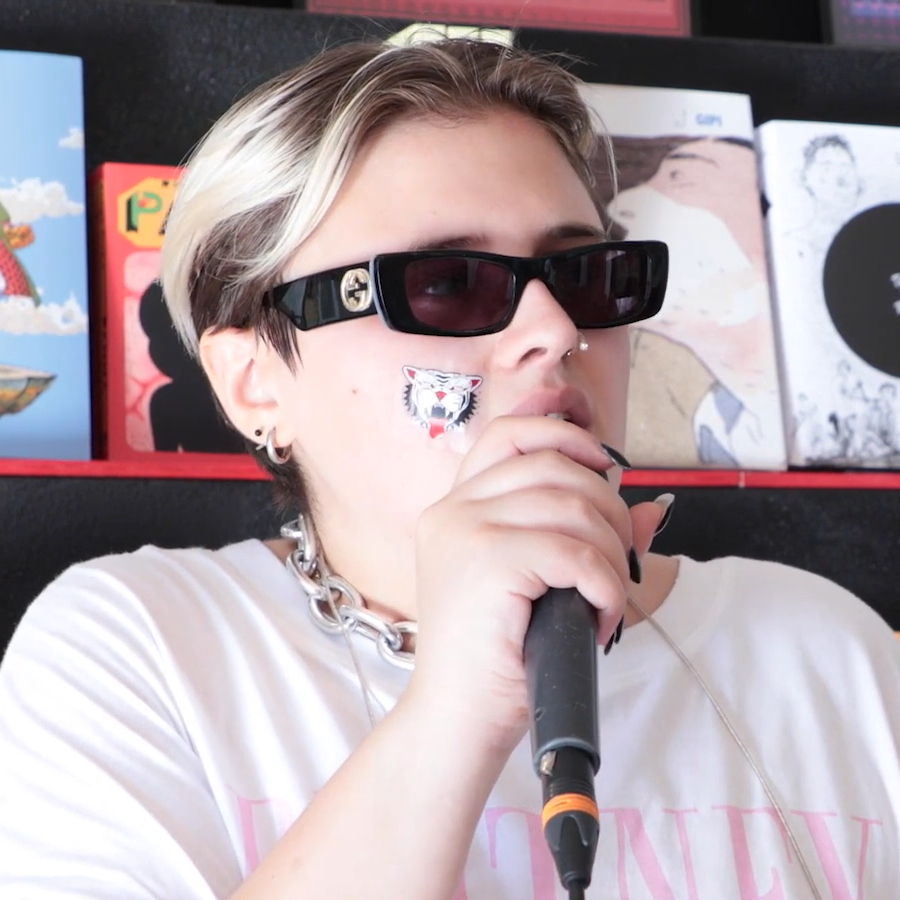
BigMama in 2023

Mammone began rapping at the age of 13. In 2016, at the age of 16, she began publishing her songs at the encouragement of her friends. She duetted with Elodie at the Sanremo Music Festival 2023, performing "American Woman" by The Guess Who.

In February 2024, she was a contestant at the Sanremo Music Festival 2024 with the song "La rabbia non ti basta". The following month, she released her second studio album, Sangue. In April 2024, she announced the publication of her first autobiography, Cento occhi, which was released on 14 May 2024. Later that month, she performed at the Una Nessuna Centomila charity concert at the Verona Arena with Alessandra Amoroso. Following the concert, Amoroso asked BigMama to collaborate on a song together, and the two eventually released the single "Mezzo rotto", which peaked at number 10 on the Italian singles chart. In September 2024, she was honored with the Breakthrough Award at the Billboard Italia Women in Music event.

She was a special guest on the second night of the Sanremo Music Festival 2025. She co-commentated the Italian broadcasts of the Eurovision Song Contest 2025 with Gabriele Corsi.

== Personal life ==
As a child, Mammone struggled with bullying due to her weight. She was diagnosed with Hodgkin lymphoma in 2020 but completed chemotherapy by February 2021 and eventually recovered.

She is openly bisexual. She is in a relationship with singer Lodovica Lazzerini.

== Discography ==
=== Studio albums ===
Title	Album details	Peak chart positions
Title	Album details	ITA
Next Big Thing	Released: 15 April 2022; Format: Digital download, streaming	—
Sangue	Released: 8 March 2024; Label: Epic, Pluggers; Format: CD, Digital download, streaming	22

=== Singles ===
Title	Year	Peak chart positions	Certifications	Album
Title	Year	ITA	Certifications	Album
"77"	2019	—		Non-album singles
"Amsa"	2019	—		Non-album singles
"Mayday" (with Lester Nowhere)	2020	—		Non-album singles
"Formato XXL" (with Real Talk)	2021	—		Non-album singles
"TooMuch" (with Crookers)	2021	—		Non-album singles
"Così leggera" (with Crookers and No Label)	2021	—		Non-album singles
"Ma che hit"	2023	—		Non-album singles
"Bloody Mary"	2023	—		Non-album singles
"La rabbia non ti basta"	2024	25	FIMI: Gold	Sangue
"Cento occhi"	2024	—		Sangue
"San Junipero"	2025	—		Non-album singles
"Bubble gum"	2025	—		Non-album singles

==== As featured artist ====
Title	Year	Peak chart positions		Certifications	Album
Title	Year	ITA	POL	Certifications	Album
"Mezzo rotto" (Alessandra Amoroso featuring BigMama)	2024	6	51	FIMI: 2× Platinum; ZPAV: Gold	Io non sarei
"Il linguaggio del corpo" (Paola & Chiara featuring BigMama)	2024	—	—		Non-album single
