= Parla con me =

Single by Eros Ramazzotti

from the album Ali e radici
- Released: May 2009
- Recorded: 2009
- Genre: pop-rock
- Length: 3:58
- Label: Sony Music
- Songwriters: Eros Ramazzotti, Claudio Guidetti, Adelio Cogliati, Michele Canova
- Producers: Eros Ramazzotti, Michele Canova

Eros Ramazzotti singles chronology
"Non Siamo Soli" (2007)	"Parla con me" (2009)

"Parla con me" ("Talk to Me") is a 2009 song by Italian singer-songwriter Eros Ramazzotti and the first single released from his eleventh studio album Ali e radici. The track was co-written and produced by Claudio Guidetti and Adelio Cogliati, who also wrote previous hits for Eros, including "Cose della vita" and "Un'altra te".

== Music video ==
The video of the song was filmed in Los Angeles by the director Marc Klasfeld. Most likely east of Palm Springs outside of Twentynine Palms area

== "Dímelo a mí" ==
As is traditional with many other successful releases of Ramazzotti songs, he released a Spanish language parallel release for Spain, Mexico, Latin America and USA Latin markets titled "Dímelo a mí" (meaning Tell It to Me). That version appears in the parallel Spanish-language version to the album Ali e radici retitled Alas y raíces

== Charts ==
Charts	Peak position
Austrian Singles Chart	31
Dutch Singles Chart	83
Italy Top 20	1
Spanish Singles Chart	41
Switzerland Top 20	8

=== Year-end charts ===
Chart (2009)	Position
Hungarian Singles Chart	26
Italian Singles Chart	20
Swiss Singles Chart	73
