= Estranei a partire da ieri =

Single by Alessandra Amoroso

from the album Senza nuvole
- Released: August 28, 2009
- Recorded: 2009
- Genre: Pop
- Length: 4:06
- Label: Sony BMG
- Songwriters: Federica Camba; Daniele Coro
- Producer: Simone Papi

Alessandra Amoroso singles chronology
"Stupida" (2009)	"Estranei a partire da ieri" (2009)	"Senza nuvole" (2009)

"Estranei a partire da ieri" is a song recorded by Italian singer Alessandra Amoroso. It was released on 28 August 2009 by Sony Music Italy as the lead single from her debut studio album Senza nuvole.

== Track listing ==
Digital download/Standard

1. "Estranei a partire da ieri" – 04:06

== The song ==
Screenshot from the videoclip of the song.

"Estranei a partire da ieri" is a song written by Daniele Coro and Federica Camba and produced by Simone Papi. The song was aired for the first time Monday, August 24 August by RTL 102.5. The song was made available for digital download at specialty stores from 28 August 2009.

On 7 September, Alessandra performed the song live for the first time in her first concert outside of Italy in Rhodes, Greece. On 19 September, Alessandra presented for the first time on television the individual to C'è posta per te.

=== The music video ===
The video is published for the first time on the site of MTV on September 21. The story begins with a girl who celebrates her birthday with friends and her boyfriend. This guy enters the scene for the second time in the company of the birthday of Alessandra: that's just a flashback. The story comes back and follows the story of Alessandra Amoroso, accompanied by this guy named Gianni. The couple live their love relationship, and are presented with several moments of the history between the two. Towards the end of the video Alessandra seems to win a ticket, a trip, but finds Gianni with a letter and a photo of a girl. The girl is the new girlfriend of Gianni, who at the beginning - and at the end - was celebrating a birthday with Gianni, our other friends, and Alessandra, aware of the end of history between the two. In the video, Alessandra writes a letter to John, perhaps because unsure of their relationship. The surprising thing is that the text of this letter is nothing more than the lyrics.

== Charts ==
Chart	Peak position
Italian FIMI Singles Chart	6

=== Year-end charts ===
Chart (2009)	Position
Italian Singles Chart	41
