= Alessandra Amoroso =

Italian singer (born 1986)

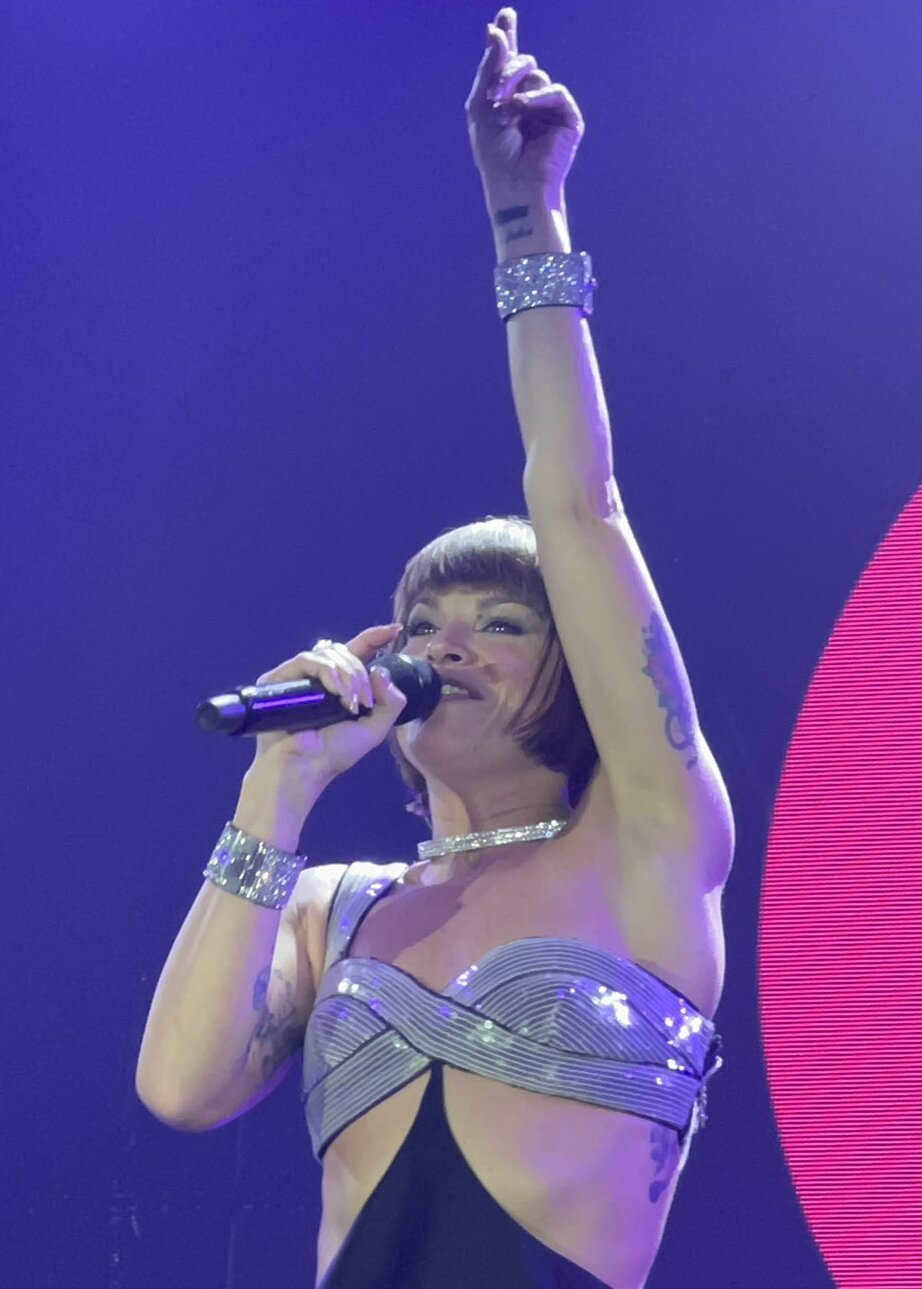
- Alessandra Amoroso in June 2023

Background information
- Born: 12 August 1986 (age 40); Galatina, Apulia, Italy
- Genres: Pop; soul
- Occupation: Singer
- Years active: 2008–present
- Label: Sony Music Italy
- Website: alessandraamoroso.it

Alessandra Amoroso (Italian pronunciation: [alesˈsandra amoˈroːzo, -oːso]; born 12 August 1986) is an Italian singer. She was the winner of the 2009 edition of the Italian talent show Amici di Maria De Filippi. Since then, she has published nine studio albums and two live albums, topping the Italian Albums Chart eight times. Amoroso has also released successful singles and collaborations, including three number one hits, selling over 3 million records in Italy.

Amoroso has collaborated and worked with notable Italian artists, including Loredana Bertè, Elisa, Emma Marrone, J-Ax, Fedez, Tiziano Ferro, Francesco Renga and Fiorella Mannoia.

In 2014, she became the first female Italian artist to win the MTV Europe Music Award for Best European Act, winning overall three MTV Europe Music Awards, seven Wind Music Awards, and received several nominations at the Kids' choice awards and World Music Awards.

She also acted in Io che amo solo te by Marco Ponti in 2015 and she co-hosted with Gianni Morandi the TV program Grazie a tutti in 2009.

== Life and career ==
=== 2007–2009: Amici di Maria De Filippi and Stupida ===
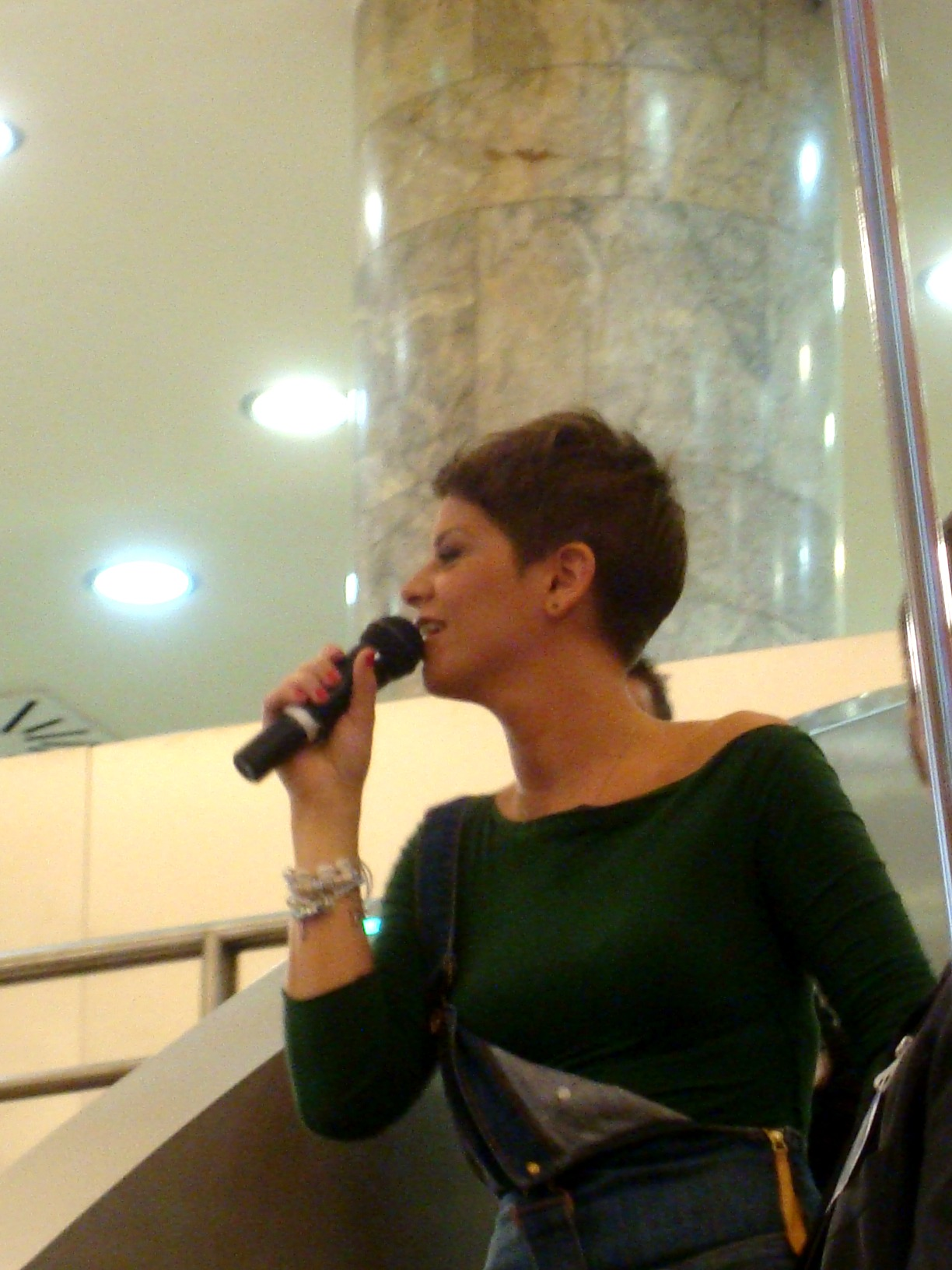
Alessandra Amoroso in 2009

Since her youth, Amoroso participated in numerous local competitions, obtaining good results. In June 2007, she participated in a contest, Fiori di Pesco, singing the song Amor mio, and placed first among the competitors, and was rewarded by Mogol. When she was seventeen, she auditioned for Amici but she failed.

On 5 October 2008, Amoroso passed the audition for the eighth season of Amici di Maria De Filippi, singing the Alicia Keys single, "If I Ain't Got You". She participated in the recording of the compilation disc of the programme, Scialla. "Find a Way" reached number four on the singles charts, while "Immobile" topped the chart. During the program, the singer distinguished herself thanks to her voice: all the teachers, especially Luca Jurman, recognized a sandblasted timbre. On 25 March 2009, Amoroso was proclaimed winner of Amici di Maria De Filippi, winning the first prize of 200,000 euros. On the same evening, she also received the critics' prize, a scholarship worth 50,000 euros. With this money, Amoroso said that she would continue to study with voice teacher Luca Jurman.

After presenting the song during the final of Amici di Maria De Filippi, Alessandra released her first single, "Stupida" on 27 March 2009. The song achieved great success, topping the Italian singles chart. Her debut extended play, Stupida, was released on 10 April 2009 via Sony Music Italy. The EP was certified gold in pre-order, due to pre-orders in excess of 35,000 copies. On 6 June 2009, in Verona, Alessandra received two Wind Music Award for the sales of Stupida and the compilation Scialla, both certified multiplatinum.

From 19 June to 22 September 2009, Amoroso embarked upon a summer tour in promotion of the Stupida EP in stadiums and theatres throughout Italy. Her concert at Arena Ciccio Franco in Reggio Calabria was recorded on 20 August 2009. In addition to the various stages of the main tour, Alessandra participated in several other tours, including Radio Norba Battiti Live and Trl On Tour, in addition to the tour organized by Amici di Maria de Filippi. On 21 June 2009, she performed at the concert "Amiche per l’abruzzo", organized by Laura Pausini, at the San Siro stadium in Milan. As of 2010, Stupida has sold over 200,000 copies in Italy, thus obtaining a double platinum certification.

=== 2009–2010: Senza nuvole ===
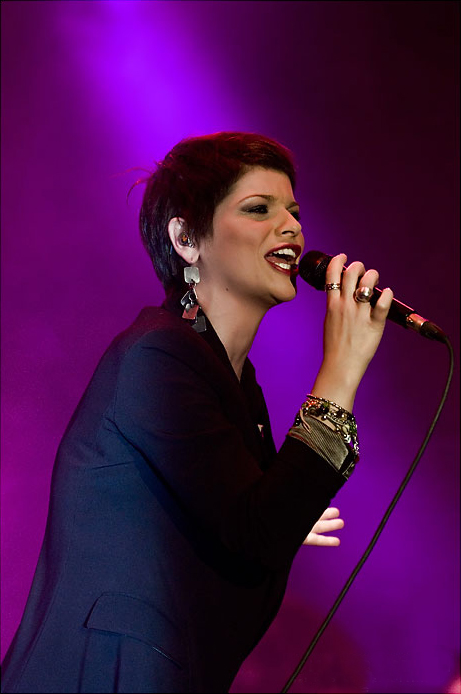
Alessandra Amoroso in 2010

On 12 September 2009 in Rome – during Reggaexplosion – Amoroso duetted with Sud Sound System, an Italian band, thus realizing one of her dreams. On 3 October 2009 she participated in O' Scià, a song event organized by Claudio Baglioni. On 31 July 2009, during the Stupida Tour, Amoroso officially announced the release date of her debut studio album, Senza nuvole, scheduled for 25 September 2009. A version of the album with an extra DVD containing unreleased footage of Amoroso in the recording studio and on her summer tour was also released. The album was anticipated by the single "Estranei a partire da ieri", broadcast on radio from 28 August. On 8 October, Amoroso presented the album for the first time at the Limelight in Milan. Fans could watch the concert in 37 selected cinemas across Italy who broadcast the event live via satellite in high definition. The album spent four weeks atop the Italian albums chart.

The second single extracted from the album was the title-track "Senza nuvole", which was also the soundtrack to Love 14, a film by Federico Moccia. The song's music video was awarded as Best 2009 video at the Rome Clip Film Festival on 10 December 2009. From 8 to 29 November 2009, the singer presented a variety show, called Grazie a tutti, with Gianni Morandi. Amoroso and Morandi also recorded a duet together for his album Canzoni da non perdere, titled "Credo nell'amore". In December 2009 Amoroso recorded, along with other artists, including J Ax and Marracash, a Christmas jingle for Radio Deejay, entitled "Questo natale". From 21 January 2010 to 13 March 2010, Amoroso embarked on the Senza Nuvole Live Tour.

On 22 January 2010, "Mi sei venuto a cercare tu" was released as the album's third single. During the third and fourth evenings of the Sanremo Festival in 2010, Alessandra performed with Valerio Scanu, the winner of the festival. On 2 April 2010, "Arrivi tu" was released as the fourth and final single from the album. On 8 May 2010, Alessandra participated in TRL Awards 2010, because of the two nominations she received for the category MTV TRL First Lady and My Trl Best Video. Alessandra also participated in Wind Music Awards 2010, winning an award thank to the sales of Senza nuvole. From 4 July 2010 to 12 September 2010, Alessandra embarked on the Un'Estate Senza Nuvole Live Tour. Senza nuvole was certified triple platinum in Italy for sales exceeding 210,000 copies.

=== 2010–2012: Il mondo in un secondo and Cinque passi in più ===
On 15 July 2010, Sony Music Italy announced Alessandra Amoroso's second studio album. The title, Il mondo in un secondo, was announced on the official forum of the singer on 29 August 2010. The album's release date, 28 September 2010, was announced on 30 August on Sony's official website, consisting of thirteen songs, including two in English produced by Chico Bennett, who has previously worked with artists such as Madonna and Destiny's Child. The album was anticipated by the single "La mia storia con te" on 1 September 2010. The song reached the top ten of the airplay chart, and number two on the Italian singles chart. "La mia storia con te" was also included on the soundtrack of the Italian film, La figlia di Elisa 2.

In September 2011, Alessandra announced that she was working on a new live project. The track "E' vero che vuoi restare", was released on 4 November 2011 as the first single from her first live album, Cinque passi in più, containing a CD with 5 new songs and a live CD with the concert that Alessandra held in Milan on 22 December 2010 at Mediolanum Forum. A deluxe version of the album containing a DVD of the concert and backstage scenes, five postcards, photo of Alessandra and a 36-page-booklet was also available. On 20 January 2012 the second single from the album was published, titled "Ti aspetto". A music video for the song, filmed in London, was released on 4 March. In Italy, the album sold more than 120,000 copies and was certified double platinum.

=== 2013–2015: Amore puro and success in Latin America with Alessandra Amoroso ===
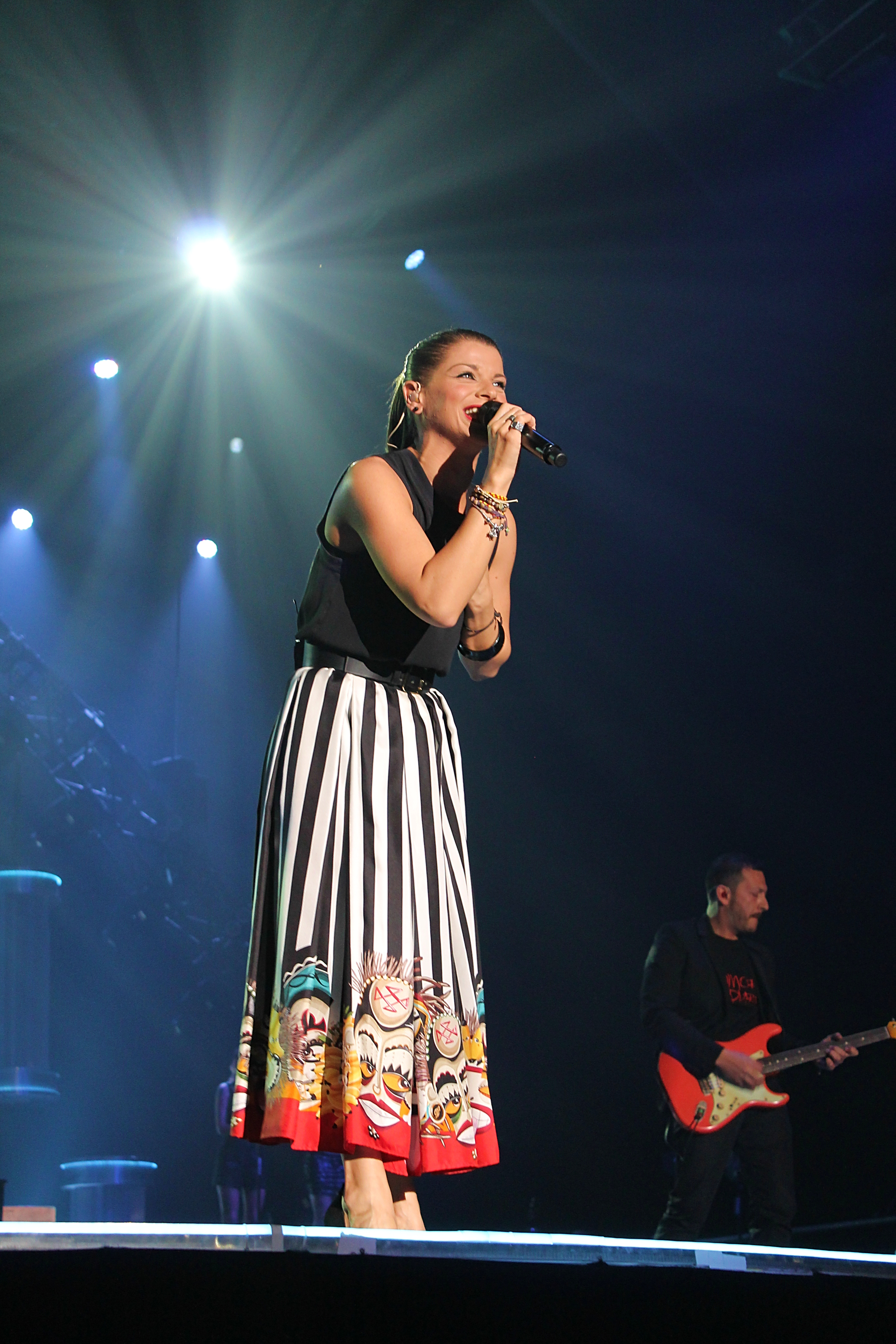
Alessandra Amoroso in 2014

In early 2013, Amoroso performed at numerous events and television programs, announcing in the summer the release of her third studio album, produced by Tiziano Ferro. On 20 August 2013 she published the single "Amore puro", which debuted at number 4 on the Italian singles chart. The following 24 September, the album of the same name as the single was released, debuting at number one and being certified double platinum. On 3 May 2014, she performed the Italian anthem before the 2013-2014 Coppa Italia final, promoting her concert at the Arena di Verona on 19 May, which was attended by, in order of performance, Emma Marrone, Annalisa, Moreno, Fiorella Mannoia, comedian Giorgio Panariello and Marco Mengoni. At the 2014 MTV Europe Music Awards, Amoroso won two awards for Best Italian Act and Best European South Act.

On 22 January 2015, the singer announced the release of the book A mio modo vi amo (In My Way I Love You) on 10 March, which she wrote and which collects various short stories and thoughts written by her fans.

On 28 July 2015, Amoroso collaborated with Italian group Boomdabash on the single "A tre passi da te". On the same day Amoroso announced that she had two nodules in her vocal cords and on 29 July 2015 she underwent successful surgery.

On 15 September 2015, the singer's first Spanish-language single was released entitled "Grito y no Me Escuchas", a translated version of the song "Urlo e non mi senti". The single was especially successful in Mexico, where it ranked as the most played Spanish-language song on the country's radio stations. In a press release, Sony Music Latin reveals that Amoroso's first Spanish-language album would be self-titled and would be released on 18 September 2015, with production by José Luis Pagan. After its release, the album peaked at number 31 in Spain. In November, Alessandra embarked on a promotional tour through Latin America, with stops including Mexico, Argentina and Costa Rica.

=== 2015–2019: Vivere a colori and 10 ===
On 7 November 2015, she premiered the single "Stupendo fino a qui," during her appearance on the TV program Tú sí que vales. On 11 December 2015 she announced her fourth studio album, titled Vivere a colori, would be released on 15 January 2016. The album was produced by Michele Canova and Andrea Rigonat, and features numerous writers, including Elisa, Tiromancino, Dario Faini and Tiziano Ferro. The album debuted atop the Italian Albums Chart, being certified triple platinum by FIMI with 150,000 copies sold. On 26 February 2016 the second single "Comunque andare" was released, certified quadruple platinum. On 17 March 2016, the single "Vivere a colori" was extracted as the third single, followed on 16 April by the fourth single "Sul ciglio senza far rumore". On 12 May, she participated in the program E poi c'è Cattelan, attempting to set a new record for the most duets within two minutes (with 19 people). On 20 May came the certification of entry into the Guinness Book of Records. In 2016, Amoroso was the fifth most listened-to female artist on Spotify Italy, the highest Italian singer on the list.

On 5 October 2018, Alessandra Amoroso published her sixth studio album 10, a title chosen to celebrate the singer's ten years as a solo artist, anticipated by the singles "La stessa" and "Trova un modo". In its first week of release, the album was certified gold for selling more than 25,000 copies. On 4 January 2019, she released the album's third single "Dalla tua parte". The following month, she was a guest at the 69th Sanremo Music Festival, receiving a standing ovation from the audience thanks to her rendition of "Io che non vivo (senza te)" with Claudio Baglioni. On 5 March 2019, Amoroso opened her Italian tour and published the fourth single "Forza e coraggio". In early June, the single "Mambo salentino", recorded by Boomdabash in collaboration with the singer, was released, peaking at number four on the Italian singles chart and being certified triple platinum.

A new version of "Immobile", titled "Immobile 10+1", was released on 20 December, in promotion of the 10 re-release 10, io, noi. Then, Amoroso announced she was taking an indefinite break from the music business to devote herself to her private life.

=== 2020–present: Tutto accade and Sanremo Music Festival 2024 ===
In 2020, Amoroso returned to collaborate with Boomdabash on the single "Karaoke", published on 12 June, becoming her third number one song on the Italian singles chart and being certified six times platinum. On 15 January 2021, the single "Pezzo di cuore" was released in collaboration with Emma Marrone, in promotion of the latter's compilation album, Best of Me. The song peaked at number two on the Italian singles chart and was certified platinum.

On 7 and 8 April 2021, the singles "Piuma" and "Sorriso grande" were released, respectively, presented live during a concert held by the singer in Rome via live streaming. On 3 September, the third single "Tutte le volte" was released and the seventh album Tutto accade released on 22 October, was confirmed. The album debuted at number two on the Italian albums chart. It was certified platinum in Italy. The fourth single was "Canzone inutile", released on 12 November 2021. Amoroso was announced by Amazon Music as one of the 4 most streamed artists in Italy in 2021, together with Mahmood, Cos Mass and Madame. On 16 May 2022, she released the single "Camera 209", anticipating the show Tutto Accade a San Siro, which saw the singer become the second Italian woman to perform at Milan's San Siro Stadium on 13 July 2022.

She competed in the Sanremo Music Festival 2024 with the song "Fino a qui", ranking ninth out of 30 contestants. On 31 May 2024 Amoroso published the collaboration "Mezzo rotto" with BigMama. On 30 May 2025 she published "Serenata" in collaboration with Serena Brancale.

== Other ventures ==
=== Model and advisor ===
- Advisor and television testimonial for STAMPS Watches (2013)
- Advisor and testimonial for Motivi (2014)
- Advisor and television testimonial for Swarovski (2016)
- Advisor and television testimonial for Pandora (2018)
- Advisor and television testimonial for OVS (2019)

== Philanthropy ==
In 2018, Amoroso founded "Big Family Onlus," a nonprofit association to support the singer's humanitarian aid campaigns. The association supports those with leukemia, eating disorders and autism, founded a home for women victims of violence, supported Italian hospitals during the COVID-19 pandemic, and raised funds for refugees from the Russian invasion of Ukraine in 2022. Amoroso also worked with Save the Children, Caritas, Médecins Sans Frontières, and AIRC Foundation for Cancer Research in Italy.

Amoroso supports LGBT rights in Italy, supporting the DDL Zan in 2021, to extend anti-racism laws to outlaw discrimination and hate crimes against women, gay and transgender people, following a number of attacks in preceding months against LGBT people.

In 2009, she became a representative of ADMO, an Italian bone marrow charity, joining the national bone marrow donation register in December of the same year.

On 21 June 2009, Amoroso performed at the "Amiche per l'Abruzzo", a charity initiative concert created after the L'Aquila earthquake, alongside 102 Italian female singers, including Laura Pausini, Fiorella Mannoia, Gianna Nannini, Elisa, Emma Marrone, Giorgia, Arisa, Carmen Consoli and Raffaella Carrà.

In 2020, the benefit concert event "Una, Nessuna, Centomila" was announced, promoted by the singer herself together with Laura Pausini, Fiorella Mannoia, Gianna Nannini, Elisa, Emma Marrone and Giorgia, to combat gender inequality and violence against women in Italy. The concert, scheduled for 19 September 2020, was postponed to 11 June 2022 due to the COVID-19 pandemic.

== Musical influences ==
Alessandra Amoroso has repeatedly stated that her favorite kinds of music are the black, soul, R&B and gospel, which represent the timbre of the singer. She cited Anastacia, Beyoncé, Anita Baker as international artists who have most influenced her and Elisa, Mina, Tiziano Ferro among Italian artists.

Luca Jurman, at the entrance of Alessandra in Amici di Maria De Filippi, saying "Alessandra is the new Anita Baker" associated her timbre to that of the renowned R&B singer.

== Discography ==
- Senza nuvole (2009)
- Il mondo in un secondo (2010)
- Amore puro (2013)
- Alessandra Amoroso (2015)
- Vivere a colori (2016)
- 10 (2018)
- Tutto accade (2021)
- Io non sarei (2025)

== Tours ==
- Stupida Tour (2009)
- Senza Nuvole Live Tour (2010)
- Un'Estate Senza Nuvole Live Tour (2010)
- Il Mondo in un Secondo Tour (2011)
- Amore Puro Tour (2013)
- Vivere a Colori Tour (2016-2017)
- 10 Tour (2019)
- Tutto Accade Tour (2022)
- Fino a Qui in Tour (2024)
- Fino a Qui Summer Tour (2025)

== Awards and competitions ==
Year	Ceremony	Category / Nominated Work	Result	Ref.
2009	Wind Music Awards	Multi Platinum Disc Awards (Scialla with Amici di Maria de Filippi's cast)	Won	
2009	Wind Music Awards	Multi Platinum Disc Awards (Stupida)	Won	
2009	Roma Videoclip Awards	Videoclips of the Year ("Senza nuvole")	Won	
2010	Wind Music Award	Multi Platinum Single Awards ("Senza nuvole")	Won	
2010	MTV Italian Music Awards	MTV First Lady	Nominated	
2010	MTV Italian Music Awards	Best Video ("Senza nuvole")	Nominated	
2010	Barocco Award	Honoree Award	Won	
2011	MTV Italian Music Awards	Best Talent Show Artist	Nominated	
2011	Wind Music Awards	Multi Platinum Disc Awards (Il mondo in un secondo)	Won	
2012	Wind Music Awards	Multi Platinum Disc Award (Cinque passi in più)	Won	
2012	Kids' Choice Awards	Best Italian Act	Nominated	
2012	Rockol Awards	Best Italian Video ("Ciao")	Won	
2012	Rockol Awards	Best Italian Song ("Ciao")	Won	
2013	Rockol Awards	Best Italian Song ("Amore puro")	Won	
2014	MTV Europe Music Awards	Best Worldwide Act	Nominated	
2014	MTV Europe Music Awards	Best Italian Act	Won	
2014	Kids' Choice Awards	Best Italian Act	Nominated	
2014	World Music Awards	Best Album (Amore puro)	Nominated	
2014	World Music Awards	Best Video ("Amore puro")	Nominated	
2014	World Music Awards	Best Live Act	Nominated	
2014	World Music Awards	Best Entertainer of the Year	Nominated	
2014	World Music Awards	Best Female Artist	Nominated	
2014	MTV Italian Music Awards	Wonder Woman	Won	
2014	MTV Italian Music Awards	Artist Saga	Nominated	
2014	Wind Music Awards	Platinum Disc Award (Amore puro)	Won	
2014	Italia Summer Festival	Songs of the Summer ("Non devi perdermi")	Won	
2015	MTV Italian Music Awards	Wonder Woman	Won	
2015	MTV Italian Music Awards	Artist Saga	Nominated	
2015	MTV Italian Music Awards	#MTVAwardsStar	Nominated	
2015	Onstage Awards	Best Fanbase	Won	
2016	Roma Videoclip Awards	Videoclips of the Year ("Comunque andare")	Won	
2016	Wind Music Awards	Platinum Disc Awards (Vivere a colori)	Won	
2016	Wind Music Awards	Platinum Single Awards ("Comunque andare")	Won	
2016	Latin Music Italian Awards	Best International Song of The Year ("Comunque andare")	Won	
2016	MTV Italian Music Awards	Artist saga	Nominated	
2016	Bama Music Awards	Best Female Act	Nominated	
2016	AllMusic Italia Awards	Best Album (Vivere a colori)	Won	
2017	Wind Music Awards	Platinum Tour Award (Vivere a colori Tour)	Won	
2019	Seat Music Awards	Platinum Tour Award (10 Tour)	Won	
2019	Seat Music Awards	Platinum Disc Award (10)	Won	
2020	Onstage Awards	Best Female Artist	Nominated	
2020	Onstage Awards	Best Tour Act	Won	
2021	Seat Music Awards	Multi Platinum Single Awards (Karaoke)	Won	
