= Stupida (song) =

2009 single by Alessandra Amoroso

Single by Alessandra Amoroso

from the album Stupida
- Released: 27 March 2009
- Recorded: 2009
- Genre: Pop
- Length: 3:33
- Label: Sony BMG
- Songwriters: Diego Calvetti; Federica Camba; Daniele Coro

Alessandra Amoroso singles chronology
"Immobile" (2009)	"Stupida" (2009)	"Estranei a partire da ieri" (2009)

"Stupida" is a song recorded by Italian singer Alessandra Amoroso. It was released on March 27, 2009 as the second single from her debut extended play Stupida.

== Track listing ==
Digital download/Standard

1. "Stupida" – 03:33

Digital download/Remix

1. "Stupida (Remix by Emiliano Pepe feat La Pina)" – 03:54

== The song ==
"Stupida" was written by Diego Calvetti, Federica Camba and Daniele Coro. Alessandra Amoroso first performed this song in the last episode of the television talent show Amici di Maria De Filippi, which she won. The song was released for digital download and for radio airplay on 27 March 2009. The single debuted in the charts at number 22 and then climbed to number one. In May 2009 a remix of "Stupida" was released by Emiliano Pepe featuring La Pina. On 2 September "Stupida" was song of the week for listings magazine TV Sorrisi e Canzoni. It was certified platinum for selling over 30,000 copies.

Screenshot from the videoclip of the song.

=== The music video ===
The music video for "Stupida" was filmed in Verona and was inspired by the movie Groundhog Day. In the video Alessandra Amoroso repeats her birthday, 12 August, but no one is aware of her presence. Towards the end of the video the dark bluish tones change to more natural and bright colours as time begins to flow normally again.

== Charts ==
Chart	Peak position
FIMI	1
Swiss	64

=== Year-end charts ===
Chart (2009)	Position
Italian Singles Chart	27

== La India version ==
"Estupida"

Single by India

from the album Unica
- Released: 23 February 2010 (original version); 25 May 2010 (ballad version)
- Recorded: 2010
- Genre: Salsa, Latin pop
- Length: 4:19 (original version); 3:24 (ballad version)
- Label: Top Stop Music
- Songwriters: Diego Calvetti; Federica Camba; Daniele Coro
- Producer: Sergio George

India's singles chronology
"El Amor (Salsa version)" (2009)	"Estupida" (2010)	"Si El Habla Te De Mi" (2010)

"Estupida" (English: Stupid) is India's first single from her 2010 album, Unica. The song was released in two versions, a salsa version as well as a ballad version. The salsa version was released on 23 February 2010, while the ballad was released three months later on 25 May 2010. Music videos were recorded and released for both versions of the song. The salsa version was released on 23 February 2010 makes it Unica's. The salsa version debuted at #10 on the tropical charts and quickly made it to the #1 position in just a matter of weeks. A music video was also released for the song which was actually filmed in Brescia, Italy. At the 2011 Lo Nuestro Awards, India's cover received a nomination for Tropical Song of the Year.

=== Charts ===
Chart (2010)	Peak position
US Hot Latin Songs (Billboard)	40
US Tropical Airplay (Billboard)	1

==== Year-end charts ====
Chart (2010)	Peak position
US Tropical Songs (Billboard)	14
