= Immobile (song) =

Single by Alessandra Amoroso

from the EP Stupida
- Released: January 16, 2009
- Recorded: 2008
- Genre: Pop
- Length: 3:21
- Label: Sony BMG
- Songwriters: Federica Camba; Daniele Coro
- Producers: Mario Lavezzi; Nicolò Fragile

Alessandra Amoroso singles chronology
"Immobile" (2009)	"Stupida" (2009)

"Immobile" is the debut single by Italian singer Alessandra Amoroso. The song premiered during the singer's participation to the television talent show Amici di Maria De Filippi and was featured on the show's compilation album Scialla in January 2009. It was later included in Amoroso's debut extended play Stupida.

"Immobile" is one of the most commercially successful singles released by a contestant of the television show Amici. It reached number one in the national singles charts and was certified platinum by the Federation of the Italian Music Industry for selling over 30,000 units.

== Track listing ==
Digital download

No.	Title	Writer(s)	Length
1.	"Immobile"	Daniele Coro and Federica Camba	03:20

== Charts ==
Chart	Peak position
FIMI	1

=== Year-end charts ===
Chart (2009)	Position
Italian Singles Chart	16
