= Giusy Ferreri discography =

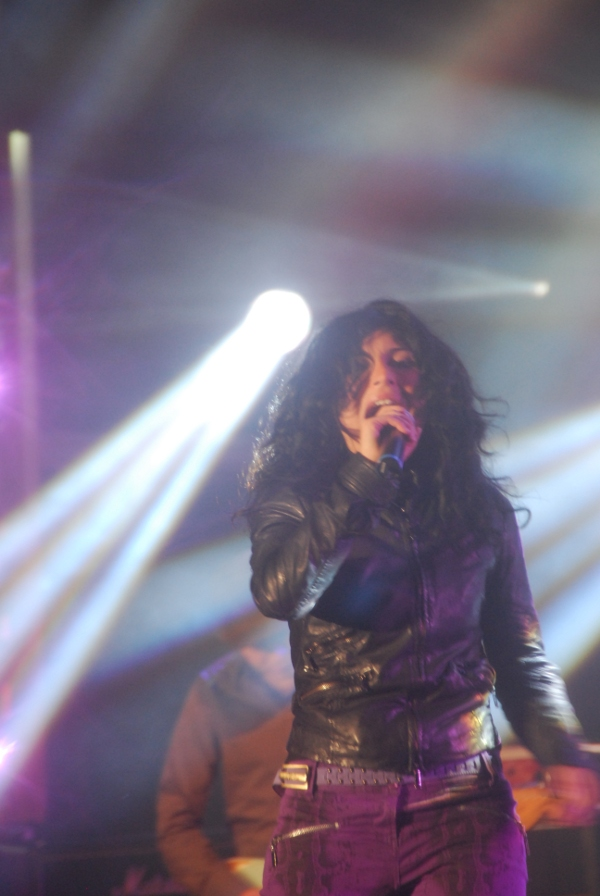
- Giusy Ferreri in 2009, performing during a concert in Trento, Italy
- Studio albums: 5
- EPs: 1
- Compilation albums: 2
- Singles: 28
- Music videos: 19

The discography of Italian singer Giusy Ferreri consists of five studio albums, two compilation albums, one extended play, twenty-seven singles—including six as a featured artist—and nineteen music videos.

Giusy Ferreri debuted in May 2005, with the release of the single "Il party", which failed to achieve commercial success. In 2008 she finished as the runner-up of the first series of Italian talent show X Factor. Shortly after the end of the competition, she released the single "Non ti scordar mai di me" and the extended play with the same title, which sold over 300,000 copies in Italy.

Ferreri's first studio album, Gaetana, was released in November 2008, preceded by the single "Novembre". According to Musica e Dischi, the album sold in excess of 700,000 copies in Italy. Gaetana also spawned the singles "Stai fermo lì" and "La scala (The Ladder)", and it was also successful in Greece, where it was certified platinum by IFPI.

In 2009, Ferreri recorded and released the album Fotografie, entirely composed of covers of both Italian and international songs. The album was preceded by the single "Ma il cielo è sempre più blu", a recording of Rino Gaetano's 1975 hit. "Come pensi possa amarti" and "Il mare verticale" were simultaneously released as additional singles from Fotografie, while the album's final single was a posthumous duet with Luigi Tenco, "Ciao amore ciao".

In 2011, Ferreri competed in 61st Sanremo Music Festival, performing the song "Il mare immenso", which later became a gold-selling single in Italy. The song launched her third studio album, Il mio universo, released by Sony Music in February of the same year. Three years later, Ferreri returned to compete in the 64th edition of the contest. Among her entries, "L'amore possiede il bene" and "Ti porto a cena con me", the latter reached the final of the contest and was chosen as the lead single from her fourth studio album, L'attesa.

In 2015, she appeared as a featured artist on Baby K's "Roma-Bangkok", which became the best-selling single of the year. The song was later included in Ferreri's Hits, which was also preceded by the single "Volevo te", certified platinum by the Federation of the Italian Music Industry.

== Albums ==
=== Studio albums ===
List of albums, with selected chart positions, sales, and certifications
Title	Album details	Peak chart positions				Sales	Certifications
Title	Album details	ITA	BEL (Wa)	GRE	SWI	Sales	Certifications
Gaetana	Released: 14 November 2008; Label: Sony BMG, Ricordi; Formats: CD, digital download	2	52	2	20	ITA: 490,000; GRE: 6,000	FIMI: 7× Platinum; IFPI GRE: Platinum
Fotografie	Released: 20 November 2009; Label: Sony Music, Ricordi; Formats: CD, download	10	—	16	87	ITA: 70,000^{[A]}	FIMI: Platinum
Il mio universo	Released: 16 February 2011; Label: Sony Music, Ricordi; Formats: CD, download	11	—	—	98		
L'attesa	Released: 25 March 2014; Label: Sony Music; Formats: CD, download	4	—	—	—		
Girotondo	Released: 3 March 2017; Label: Sony Music; Formats: CD, download	11	—	—	—		
Cortometraggi	Released: 18 February 2022; Label: Sony Music, Columbia; Formats: CD, download, streaming	25	—	—	—		
"—" denotes albums that did not chart or were not released.

=== Compilation albums ===
List of albums, with selected chart positions, sales, and certifications
Title	Album details	Peak chart positions	Sales and certifications
Title	Album details	ITA	Sales and certifications
Supermarket^{[B]} (credited to Gaetana)	Released: 13 November 2009; Label: Spherica; Formats: CD, download	—	
Hits	Released: 4 December 2015; Label: RCA, Sony Music; Formats: CD, download	16	FIMI: Gold
"—" denotes albums that did not chart or were not released.

== EPs ==
List of albums, with selected chart positions, sales, and certifications
Title	Album details	Peak chart positions	Sales	Certifications
Title	Album details	ITA	Sales	Certifications
Non ti scordar mai di me	Released: 27 June 2008; Label: Sony BMG, Ricordi; Formats: CD, download	1	ITA: 315,000	FIMI: 3× Platinum

== Singles ==
=== As lead artist ===
List of singles as lead artist, with chart positions and certifications in Italy
Single	Year	Peak chart positions			Sales	Certifications	Album
Single	Year	ITA	BEL (Wa)	SWI	Sales	Certifications	Album
"Il party"	2005	—	—	—			Non-album single
"Non ti scordar mai di me"	2008	1	—^{[C]}	26	ITA: 286,859	FIMI: 5× Platinum	Non ti scordar mai di me
"Novembre"	2008	1	—	65	ITA: 121,881	FIMI: 2× Platinum	Gaetana
"Stai fermo lì"	2009	15	—	—			Gaetana
"La scala (The Ladder)"	2009	36	—	—			Gaetana
"Ma il cielo è sempre più blu"	2009	2	—	—	ITA: 15,000^{[D]}	FIMI: Gold	Fotografie
"Come pensi possa amarti"	2010	—	—	—			Fotografie
"Il mare verticale"	2010	—	—	—			Fotografie
"Ciao amore ciao" (featuring Luigi Tenco)	2010	—	—	—			Fotografie
"Il mare immenso"	2011	6	—	—	ITA: 25,000^{[D]}	FIMI: Gold	Il mio universo
"Piccoli dettagli"	2011	47	—	—			Il mio universo
"Noi brave ragazze"	2011	—	—	—			Il mio universo
"Ti porto a cena con me"	2014	14	—	—			L'attesa
"L'amore possiede il bene"	2014	52	—	—			L'attesa
"La bevanda ha un retrogusto amaro"	2014	—	—	—			L'attesa
"Inciso sulla pelle"	2014	—	—	—			L'attesa
"Volevo te"	2015	14	—	—	ITA: 100,000^{[E]}	FIMI: 2× Platinum	Hits
"Come un'ora fa"	2016	—	—	—			Hits
"Fa talmente male"	2017	57	—	—			Girotondo
"Partiti adesso"	2017	51	—	—	ITA: 50,000^{[E]}	FIMI: Platinum	Girotondo
"L'amore mi perseguita" (featuring Federico Zampaglione)	2017	—	—	—			Girotondo
"Le cose che canto"	2019	—	—	—			Non-album singles
"Momenti perfetti"	2019	—	—	—			Non-album singles
"La Isla" (with Elettra Lamborghini)	2020	22	—	—	ITA: 70,000^{[E]}	FIMI: Platinum	Non-album singles
"Gli Oasis di una volta"	2021	—	—	—			Cortometraggi
"Miele"	2022	23	—	—			Cortometraggi
"Cuore sparso"	2022	—	—	—			Cortometraggi
"Causa effetto"	2022	—	—	—			Cortometraggi
"Federico Fellini"	2022	—	—	—			Cortometraggi
"Il meglio di te"	2023	—	—	—			Non-album single
"Musica classica"	2026	—	—	—			TBA
"—" denotes singles that did not chart or were not released.

=== As featured artist ===
List of singles as featured artist, with chart positions and certifications in Italy
Single	Year	Peak chart positions				Sales	Certifications	Album
Single	Year	ITA	BEL (Wa)	FRA	SWI	Sales	Certifications	Album
"Domani 21/04.09" (Artisti Uniti per l'Abruzzo)	2009	1	—	—	—	ITA: 520,000	FIMI: Multi-Platinum	Charity single
"Tocca a noi" (with J-Ax, Marracash and Le Vibrazioni)	2009	—	—	—	—			Non-album single
"Rivincita" (Marracash featuring Giusy Ferreri)	2010	92	—	—	—			Fino a qui tutto bene
"Nessuno poteva non sapere" (Alessandro Haber featuring Enzo Gragnaniello, Giuliano Sangiorgi, Giusy Ferreri and Phil Palmer)	2011	—	—	—	—			Haber bacia tutti
"Che senso ha" (Alessandro Haber featuring Giusy Ferreri)	2012	—	—	—	—			Haber bacia tutti
"Roma-Bangkok" (Baby K featuring Giusy Ferreri)	2015	1	—^{[F]}	25	23	ITA: 500,000	FIMI: Diamond	Kiss Kiss Bang Bang
"Amore e capoeira" (Takagi & Ketra featuring Giusy Ferreri and Sean Kingston)	2018	1	—	—	2	ITA: 250,000; SWI:15,000	FIMI: 5× Platinum; IFPI SWI: Platinum	Non-album singles
"Jambo" (Takagi & Ketra featuring Omi and Giusy Ferreri)	2019	1	—	—	11	ITA: 280,000	FIMI: 4× Platinum	Non-album singles
"Non solo parole" (Gigi D'Alessio featuring Giusy Ferreri)	2020	—	—	—	—			Noi due
"Shimmy Shimmy" (Takagi & Ketra featuring Giusy Ferreri)	2021	22	—	—	—	ITA: 70,000	FIMI: Platinum	Non-album single
"—" denotes singles that did not chart or were not released.

=== Other charted songs ===
List of non-single charted songs
Song	Year	Peak chart positions	Sales	Certifications	Album
Song	Year	ITA	Sales	Certifications	Album
"Remedios"	2008	7	ITA: 12,075		Non ti scordar mai di me
"Insieme a te non ci sto più"	2008	31			Non ti scordar mai di me
"Ma che freddo fa"	2008	36			Non ti scordar mai di me
"La bambola"	2008	38			Non ti scordar mai di me
"L'amore e basta" (featuring Tiziano Ferro)	2008	26			Gaetana
"Una ragione di più" (Ornella Vanoni featuring Giusy Ferreri)	2008	47			Più di me

== Other appearances ==
List of other album appearances
Contribution	Year	Album
"Una ragione di più" (Ornella Vanoni featuring Giusy Ferreri)	2008	Più di me
"Noi sulla città" (Claudio Baglioni featuring Giusy Ferreri)	2009	Q.P.G.A.
"Aria di vita" (Neri per Caso featuring Giusy Ferreri)	2010	Donne
"Tu sì 'na cosa grande" (Gennaro Cosmo Parlato featuring Giusy Ferreri)	2011	Terra mia
"Mal di luna" (Nicola Piovani featuring Giusy Ferreri)	2013	Piovani cantabile
"Fiore della speranza"	2013	Capo Verde terra d'amore Vol. 4
"Ite misse est" (Mario Venuti featuring Giusy Ferreri and Francesco Bianconi)	2014	Il tramonto dell'Occidente
"L'amore guarisce il dolore" (Ron featuring Giusy Ferreri)	2016	La forza di dire sì
"Il giorno e la notte" (J-Ax and Fedez featuring Giusy Ferreri)	2017	Comunisti col Rolex
"Nanà Supergirl" (Cristina D'Avena featuring Giusy Ferreri)	2017	Duets - Tutti cantano Cristina

== Music videos ==
Song	Year	Director
"Il party"	2005	Cosimo Alemà
"Non ti scordar mai di me"	2008	Cosimo Alemà
"Novembre"	2008	Cosimo Alemà
"Stai fermo lì"	2009	Gaetano Morbioli
"Domani 21/04.09" (with Artisti Uniti per l'Abruzzo)	2009	Ambrogio Lo Giudice
"La scala (The Ladder)"	2009	Gaetano Morbioli
"Ciao amore ciao"	2010	Gaetano Morbioli
"Rivincita" (Marracash featuring Giusy Ferreri)	2010	Cosimo Alemà
"Il mare immenso"	2011	Gaetano Morbioli
"Piccoli dettagli"	2011	Roberto "Saku" Cinardi
"Noi brave ragazze"	2011	Leandro Manuel Emede
"Ti porto a cena con me"	2014	Gaetano Morbioli
"La bevanda ha un retrogusto amaro"	2014	Luca Tartaglia
"Roma-Bangkok" (Baby K featuring Giusy Ferreri)	2015	Mauro Russo
"Volevo te"	2015	Mauro Russo
"Come un'ora fa"	2016	Gaetano Morbioli
"Fa talmente male"	2017	Gaetano Morbioli
"Partiti adesso"	2017	Gaetano Morbioli
"L'amore mi perseguita" (featuring Federico Zampaglione)	2017	Federico Zampaglione

== Notes ==
- A Sales based on certifications alone.
- B Supermarket is a compilation of songs recorded by Ferreri between October 2002 and February 2004. It was released by Spherica in November 2009 against Ferreri's will. The album was credited to Gaetana.
- C "Non ti scordar mai di me" did not enter the Ultratop 50 in Wallonia, but peaked at number 14 on the Ultratip chart.
- D Digital sales based on certifications alone.
- E Equivalent units including streaming figures, based on certifications alone.
- F "Roma-Bangkok" did not enter the Ultratop 50 in Wallonia, but peaked at number 29 on the Ultratip chart.
