= List of number-one hits of 2008 (Italy) =

This is a list of the number-one hits of 2008 on FIMI's Italian Download and Albums Charts.

Week	Issue date	Song	Artist	Album	Artist
1	4 January	"Baby Let's Play House"	Elvis Presley	All the Best	Zucchero
2	11 January	"Baby Let's Play House"	Elvis Presley	GiannaBest	Gianna Nannini
3	18 January	"Baby Let's Play House"	Elvis Presley	Safari	Jovanotti
4	25 January	"Baby Let's Play House"	Elvis Presley	Safari	Jovanotti
5	1 February	"Baby Let's Play House"	Elvis Presley	Beat ReGeneration	Pooh
6	8 February	"Apologize"	Timbaland presents OneRepublic	Beat ReGeneration	Pooh
7	15 February	"Baby Let's Play House"	Elvis Presley	Beat ReGeneration	Pooh
8	22 February	"Apologize"	Timbaland presents OneRepublic	Beat ReGeneration	Pooh
9	29 February	"Estupido"	Cinema 2	Safari	Jovanotti
10	7 March	"Colpo di fulmine"	Giò Di Tonno and Lola Ponce	Safari	Jovanotti
11	14 March	"Il mondo che vorrei"	Vasco Rossi	Safari	Jovanotti
12	21 March	"Il mondo che vorrei"	Vasco Rossi	Safari	Jovanotti
13	28 March	"Il mondo che vorrei"	Vasco Rossi	Il mondo che vorrei	Vasco Rossi
14	4 April	"4 Minutes"	Madonna featuring Justin Timberlake and Timbaland	Il mondo che vorrei	Vasco Rossi
15	11 April	"A te"	Jovanotti	Il mondo che vorrei	Vasco Rossi
16	18 April	"A te"	Jovanotti	Il mondo che vorrei	Vasco Rossi
17	25 April	"A te"	Jovanotti	Hard Candy	Madonna
18	2 May	"A te"	Jovanotti	Hard Candy	Madonna
19	9 May	"A te"	Jovanotti	Hard Candy	Madonna
20	16 May	"A te"	Jovanotti	Safari	Jovanotti
21	23 May	"A te"	Jovanotti	Per brevità chiamato artista	Francesco De Gregori
22	30 May	"Non ti scordar mai di me"	Giusy Ferreri	Secondo tempo	Ligabue
23	6 June	"Non ti scordar mai di me"	Giusy Ferreri	Secondo tempo	Ligabue
24	13 June	"Cry..."	Novecento	Viva la Vida or Death and All His Friends	Coldplay
25	20 June	"Cry..."	Novecento	Viva la Vida or Death and All His Friends	Coldplay
26	27 June	"Everything"	Michael Bublé	Non ti scordar mai di me	Giusy Ferreri
27	4 July	"Non ti scordar mai di me"	Giusy Ferreri	Non ti scordar mai di me	Giusy Ferreri
28	11 July	"Non ti scordar mai di me"	Giusy Ferreri	Non ti scordar mai di me	Giusy Ferreri
29	18 July	"Non ti scordar mai di me"	Giusy Ferreri	Non ti scordar mai di me	Giusy Ferreri
30	25 July	"Non ti scordar mai di me"	Giusy Ferreri	Non ti scordar mai di me	Giusy Ferreri
31	1 August	"Non ti scordar mai di me"	Giusy Ferreri	Non ti scordar mai di me	Giusy Ferreri
32	8 August	"Non ti scordar mai di me"	Giusy Ferreri	Non ti scordar mai di me	Giusy Ferreri
33	15 August	"Non ti scordar mai di me"	Giusy Ferreri	Non ti scordar mai di me	Giusy Ferreri
34	22 August	"Non ti scordar mai di me"	Giusy Ferreri	Non ti scordar mai di me	Giusy Ferreri
35	29 August	"Non ti scordar mai di me"	Giusy Ferreri	Non ti scordar mai di me	Giusy Ferreri
36	5 September	"Non ti scordar mai di me"	Giusy Ferreri	Non ti scordar mai di me	Giusy Ferreri
37	12 September	"Non ti scordar mai di me"	Giusy Ferreri	Death Magnetic	Metallica
38	19 September	"I Kissed a Girl"	Katy Perry	Psiche	Paolo Conte
39	26 September	"I Kissed a Girl"	Katy Perry	Psiche	Paolo Conte
40	3 October	"I Kissed a Girl"	Katy Perry	Dig Out Your Soul	Oasis
41	10 October	"Alla mia età"	Tiziano Ferro	Musica moderna	Ivano Fossati
42	17 October	"Novembre"	Giusy Ferreri	Black Ice	AC/DC
43	24 October	"Novembre"	Giusy Ferreri	Questo sono io	Gigi D'Alessio
44	31 October	"Novembre"	Giusy Ferreri	Il cielo ha una porta sola	Biagio Antonacci
45	7 November	"Novembre"	Giusy Ferreri	Alla mia età	Tiziano Ferro
46	14 November	"Novembre"	Giusy Ferreri	Primavera in anticipo	Laura Pausini
47	21 November	"Novembre"	Giusy Ferreri	Primavera in anticipo	Laura Pausini
48	28 November	"Novembre"	Giusy Ferreri	Primavera in anticipo	Laura Pausini
49	5 December	"Novembre"	Giusy Ferreri	Primavera in anticipo	Laura Pausini
50	12 December	"Novembre"	Giusy Ferreri	Primavera in anticipo	Laura Pausini
51	19 December	"Novembre"	Giusy Ferreri	Primavera in anticipo	Laura Pausini
52	26 December	"Novembre"	Giusy Ferreri	Primavera in anticipo	Laura Pausini

== See also ==
- 2008 in music
- List of number-one hits in Italy
