= Riflessi di me =

Studio album by Francesca Michielin
- Released: 2 October 2012
- Genre: Pop
- Length: 39:16
- Label: Sony Music Italy
- Producer: Andrea Rigonat

Francesca Michielin chronology
Distratto (2012)	Riflessi di me (2012)	di20 (2015)

Singles from Riflessi di me
- 1. "Sola" Released: 31 August 2012; 2. "Tutto quello che ho" Released: 16 November 2012; 3. "Se cadrai" Released: 25 January 2012

Riflessi di me is the debut studio album by Italian singer Francesca Michielin, released on 2 October 2012 and produced by Andrea Rigonat. The album was preceded on 31 August 2012 by the single "Sola", written by Elisa Toffoli and Roberto Casalino. The album also include the track "Distratto", released as Michielin's winning single shortly after she placed first at the fifth series of Italian talent show X Factor and already included in the extended play with the same title.

== Track listing ==
No.	Title	Writer(s)	Length
1.	"Sola"	Roberto Casalino; Elisa Toffoli	4:00
2.	"Arcobaleni"	Matteo Valicelli; Emma Rohan; Ashley Howes; Jez Ashurst; Richard Frederick Stannard; Charlotte Hamson; Natalie Hamson; Laura Brophy; Katie Taylor; Rachel Alderson	3:37
3.	"Quello che vorrei"	Francesca Michielin; Casalino	4:02
4.	"Mai più"	Matteo Valicelli	3:20
5.	"Se cadrai"	Carlo Bonazza; Toffoli	3:46
6.	"Tutto quello che ho"	Toffoli; Gianluca Ballarin; Tyneshia Le Blanc	3:46
7.	"Distratto"	Toffoli; Casalino	4:12
8.	"Il più bel abbraccio"	Casalino; Michael Busbee; Kevin Griffin; Joy Megan	4:03
9.	"Riflessi di me"	Michielin; Virginio Simonelli; Toffoli	3:38
10.	"Honey Sun"	Michielin	5:31
11.	"Non mi dire"	Toffoli	3:37
12.	"Un nuovo nome"	Ermal Meta	3:52
13.	"Indelebile"	Mario Cianchi; Toffoli	3:30

== Chart performance ==
=== Weekly charts ===
Chart (2012)	Peak position
Italian Albums (FIMI)	4
