= Non ti scordar mai di me =

Non ti scordar mai di me may refer to:

- Non ti scordar mai di me (EP), an EP by Giusy Ferreri
- "Non ti scordar mai di me" (song), a 2008 song by Giusy Ferreri
