= Distratto (EP) =

EP by Francesca Michielin
- Released: 24 January 2012
- Recorded: 2011
- Genre: Pop
- Label: Sony Music Entertainment Italy

Francesca Michielin chronology
Distratto (2012)	Riflessi di me (2012)

Singles from Distratto
- 1. "Distratto" Released: 6 January 2012

Distratto is the debut extended play by Italian singer Francesca Michielin. It was released in Italy on 24 January 2012 through Sony Music Entertainment Italy. The EP peaked at number 9 on the Italian Albums Chart.

== Singles ==
"Distratto" was released as the lead single from the album on 6 January 2012 after she won the fifth series of the Italian talent-show X Factor. The song peaked at number one on the Italian Singles Chart.

== Track listing ==
Standard listing
No.	Title	Writer(s)	Length
1.	"Distratto"	Roberto Casalino; Elisa Toffoli	4:14
2.	"Whole Lotta Love"	John Bonham; John Paul Jones; Jimmy Page; Robert Plant; Willie Dixon	4:04
3.	"Someone Like You"	Adele Adkins; Dan Wilson	4:36
4.	"Higher Ground"	Stevie Wonder	3:09
5.	"Roadhouse Blues"	Jim Morrison	3:45
6.	"Confusa e felice"	Carmen Consoli	3:01

== Chart performance ==
=== Weekly charts ===
Chart (2012)	Peak position
Italian Albums (FIMI)	9

== Release history ==
Region	Release date	Format	Label
Italy	24 January 2012	Digital download; CD	Sony Music Entertainment Italy
