= Sola (Francesca Michielin song) =

Single by Francesca Michielin

from the album Riflessi di me
- Released: 31 August 2012
- Recorded: 2011/12
- Genre: Pop
- Length: 4:00
- Label: Sony Music Entertainment Italy
- Songwriter(s): Roberto Casalino; Elisa Toffoli

Francesca Michielin singles chronology
"Distratto" (2012)	"Sola" (2012)	"Tutto quello che ho" (2012)

"Sola" is a song performed by Italian singer Francesca Michielin. The song was released as a digital download on 31 August 2012 through Sony Music Entertainment Italy as the lead single from her debut studio album Riflessi di me (2012). The song peaked at number 13 on the Italian Singles Chart.

== Music video ==
A music video to accompany the release of "Sola" was first released onto YouTube on 6 September 2012 at a total length of four minutes and nineteen seconds.

== Track listing ==
Digital download
No.	Title	Length
1.	"Sola"	4:00

== Chart performance ==
=== Weekly charts ===
Weekly chart performance for "Sola"
Chart (2012)	Peak position
Italy (FIMI)	13

=== Year-end charts ===
Year-end chart performance for "Sola"
Chart (2012)	Rank
Italy (FIMI)	95

== Release history ==
Region	Date	Format	Label
Italy	31 August 2012	Digital download	Sony Music Entertainment Italy
