= Volevo te =

Single by Giusy Ferreri

from the album Hits
- Released: November 6, 2015
- Recorded: 2015
- Genre: Electropop
- Length: 2:49
- Label: Sony Music
- Songwriter(s): Fortunato Zampaglione
- Producer(s): Fabrizio Ferraguzzo

Giusy Ferreri singles chronology
"Roma-Bangkok" (2015)	"Volevo te" (2015)	"Come un'ora fa" (2016)

"Volevo te" (Italian pronunciation: [voˈleːvo ˈte]; i.e. "I used to want you") is a song recorded by Italian singer Giusy Ferreri, for her album Hits (2015). The song was released on November 6, 2015 as the first single from the album.

The song was written by Fortunato Zampaglione, and produced by Fabrizio Ferraguzzo. Ferreri described the song as "The ideal meeting point between Novembre and Roma-Bangkok."

== Music video ==
The music video, directed by Mauro Russo, was published on December 4, 2015 on the official YouTube channel of the singer.

== Charts ==
Chart (2015–16)	Peak position
Italy (FIMI)	14

== Certifications ==
Region	Certification	Certified units/sales
Italy (FIMI)	2× Platinum	100,000^{‡}
^{‡} Sales+streaming figures based on certification alone.
