= Gianna (song) =

Single by Rino Gaetano

from the album Nuntereggae più
- B-side: "Visto che mi vuoi lasciare"
- Released: 27 January 1978
- Genre: pop
- Label: It
- Songwriter: Rino Gaetano
- Producers: Rino Gaetano; Rodolfo Bianchi

Rino Gaetano singles chronology
"Aida" (1977)	"Gianna" (1978)	"Nuntereggae più" (1978)

Music video
- "Gianna" on YouTube

"Gianna" is a 1978 song by Italian singer-songwriter Rino Gaetano. The song was the thirteenth best-selling single in Italy in 1978, with over 600,000 copies sold.

One of Gaetano's best-known songs over the years, "Gianna" ranked third at the 1978 Sanremo Music Festival, where it premiered on 28 January 1978. "Gianna" replaced Gaetano's first choice for the festival, "Nuntereggae più", which his producers considered not appropriate for competition. Gaetano performed it wearing a cylinder gifted to him by Renato Zero, accompanying himself on a ukulele, and with the participation of the comedy music group Pandemonium in the final verse. It is the first song in the festival's history to contain the word "sex" in the lyrics. Sanremo version of the song was slightly faster than the single version.

The title of the song was originally supposed to be Anna, in honour of the singer's sister, but was changed to Gianna for rhythmic reasons. According to one of the many interpretations that have been proposed, the song "Gianna" ironically describes Freemasonry and Italian politics, made up of illusions, promises, sex, money, materialism, and business acumen.

Gaetano also recorded English and Spanish-language versions of the song, respectively titled "Gina" and "Juanita". Wolfgang Petry's German-language cover version "Gianna (Liebe im Auto)" peaked at the seventeenth place on the hit parade. Artists who covered the song also include Ornella Vanoni, Aiello, Fausto Leali and Enrico Ruggeri.

== Track listing ==
No.	Title	Writer(s)	Length
1.	"Gianna"	Gaetano	3:50
2.	"Visto che mi vuoi lasciare"	Gaetano	3:23

== Charts ==
=== Weekly charts ===
Chart (1978)	Peak position
Italy (Musica e dischi)	1

=== Year-end charts ===
Chart (1978)	Peak position
Italy (Musica e dischi)	13
