= Distratto =

Single by Francesca Michielin

from the album Distratto
- Released: 6 January 2012
- Recorded: Henry Stills Studio, Villesse, province of Gorizia, Italy
- Genre: Pop
- Length: 4:14
- Label: Sony Music Italy
- Songwriters: Elisa; Roberto Casalino
- Producer: Andrea Rigonat

Francesca Michielin singles chronology
"Distratto" (2012)	"Sola" (2012)

Music video
- "Distratto" on YouTube

"Distratto" is the debut single by Italian singer Francesca Michielin, the winner of the fifth series of the Italian talent-show X Factor. The song, written by Elisa and Roberto Casalino, was arranged and produced by Andrea Rigonat. Michielin performed it for the first time during the semi-final of the show, on 29 December 2011. On 5 January 2012, after performing the song for a second time, Michielin was announced the winner, beating runner-up band I Moderni.

On 6 January 2012, the song was released as a digital download EP, also including three re-recorded covers previously performed during the live shows. On 12 January 2012, the single debuted at number one on the Italian Singles Chart and it was later certified double platinum by the Federation of the Italian Music Industry, for domestic downloads exceeding 60,000 units.

== Composition ==
The song is a pop ballad with rock and soul influences. It was written from the point of view of a woman who is living the end of her relationship with a man unable to understand their problems.

== Music video ==
The music video for the song was directed by Stefano Sollima and it features a cameo appearance by Italian actor Luca Argentero. The clip, filmed in January 2012 at the Roma Tiburtina railway station, was premiered on 3 February 2012 on Sky Uno HD.

== Track listing ==
Digital EP
No.	Title	Writer(s)	Length
1.	"Distratto"	Elisa Toffoli; Roberto Casalino	4:14
2.	"Whole Lotta Love"	John Bonham; John Paul Jones; Jimmy Page; Robert Plant; Willie Dixon	4:04
3.	"Someone Like You"	Adele Adkins; Dan Wilson	4:36
4.	"Higher Ground"	Stevie Wonder	3:11
Total length:			16:03

Re-release bonus tracks
No.	Title	Writer(s)	Length
5.	"Roadhouse Blues"	Jim Morrison	3:45
6.	"Confusa e felice"	Carmen Consoli	3:01
Total length:			21:49

== Chart performance ==
=== Weekly charts ===
Chart (2012)	Peak position
Italy (FIMI)	1

=== Year-end charts ===
Chart (2012)	Position
Italy (FIMI)	10
