= Nuntereggae più =

Single by Rino Gaetano

from the album Nuntereggae più
- B-side: "E cantava le canzoni"
- Released: June 1978
- Genre: reggae singer-songwriter
- Label: It
- Songwriter: Rino Gaetano
- Producers: Rino Gaetano; Rodolfo Bianchi

Rino Gaetano singles chronology
"Gianna" (1978)	"Nuntereggae più" (1978)	"Resta vile maschio, dove vai?" (1979)

Nuntereggae più is a 1978 song by Rino Gaetano and the title track of his fourth album, released that same year.

In January 1978, after doubts and hesitations, he participated in the Sanremo Music Festival with the song "Gianna" achieving great success and finishing in third place. However, the singer-songwriter would have preferred to compete with "Nuntereggae più," but he was strongly discouraged from doing so.

== History and significance ==
"Someone wants to silence me! I’m not afraid of them. They won’t succeed. I feel that my songs will be sung by future generations, who, thanks to mass communication, will understand what I mean tonight."

— Rino Gaetano, shortly before a concert on the beach of Capocotta in 1979.

1978 was a tragic and complex year marked by significant events in Italy, which included three popes, two presidents, and the kidnapping and murder of Aldo Moro, preceded by the massacre of his security detail. The 1976 Italian elections saw a strong showing by the Italian Communist Party, which gained a majority in the Chamber, but the Christian Democracy Party remained the largest party overall. Effectively, DC and PCI emerged as the winners. This duality brings to mind Rino Gaetano's lyrics: “dcpsi / nuntereggae più / dcpci / pcipsi plipri / dcpci pcidc.” His song encapsulates the essence of 1978 and remains relevant in reflecting the crises of that time.

The lyrics include the names of notable public figures at the time. The list is as follows: Vincenzo Cazzaniga, Gianni Agnelli, Umberto Agnelli, Susanna Agnelli, Attilio Monti, Leopoldo Pirelli, Franco Causio, Marco Tardelli, Giuliano Musiello, Giancarlo Antognoni, Renato Zaccarelli, Gianni Brera, Enzo Bearzot, Carlos Monzón, Adriano Panatta, Gianni Rivera, Pompeo D'Ambrosio, Niki Lauda, Gustav Thöni, Maurizio Costanzo, Mike Bongiorno, Paolo Villaggio, Raffaella Carrà, Francesco Guccini, Sigmund Freud, Cartier, Pierre Cardin, and Gucci.

Gaetano reviews the clichés of the politics of that time.

Mi sia consentito dire / nuntereggae più / il nostro è un partito serio / certo! / disponibile al confronto / nella misura in cui / alternativo
"Allow me to say / nuntereggae più / ours is a serious party / certainly! / open to dialogue / as long as / it's alternative."

This draws on a quote from Amintore Fanfani (with his favorite phrase "allow me to say") and from Enrico Berlinguer (with his statement "ours is a serious party"), progressively moving to the colloquial leftist expressions of "as long as" and "dialogue," always with an alternative stance.

In a 1978 RAI radio interview for the program Quadernetto Romano, Enzo Siciliano described the song's lyrics as a kind of catalog and asked Gaetano if there was a logical thread. Gaetano confirmed this, explaining his creative process involved taking various newspapers, categorizing articles, and randomly selecting topics to write the song, making the lyrics essentially headlines. His method reflects a free, chance-based creative approach reminiscent of Dadaism, where concepts like morality, family, and politics become empty conventions. When Siciliano mentioned the risk of superficiality, Gaetano responded that his music is escapist; he prefers to create love songs and engage with societal issues in a way that brings enjoyment rather than burdening listeners. Siciliano noted that Gaetano's songs do address social problems, to which Gaetano agreed but emphasized that he aims to make the experience pleasurable.

== Track listing ==
No.	Title	Length
1.	"Nuntereggae più"	4:02
2.	"E cantava le canzoni"	3:21

== Charts ==
=== Weekly charts ===
Chart (1978)	Peak position
Italy (Musica e dischi)	24
