= X Factor (Italian TV series) season 5 =

X Factor
- Season 5
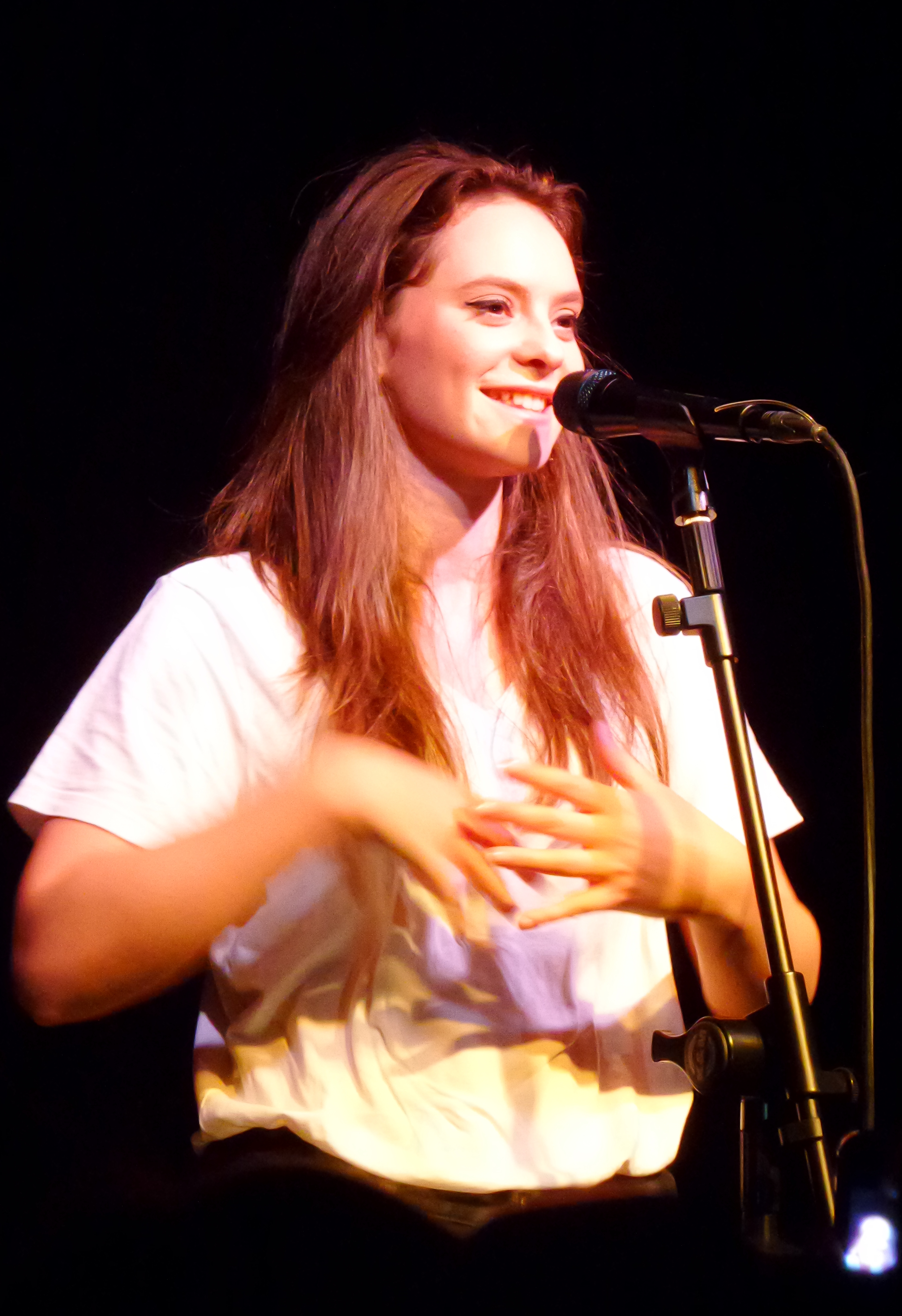
- Hosted by: Alessandro Cattelan (Sky Uno)
- Judges: Simona Ventura; Morgan; Elio; Arisa
- Winner: Francesca Michielin
- Winning mentor: Simona Ventura
- Runner-up: I Moderni

Release
- Original network: Sky Italia
- Original release: 20 October 2011 – 5 January 2012

Season chronology
- Next → Season 6

X Factor is an Italian television music competition to find new singing talent; the winner receives a €300,000 recording contract with Sony Music. The fifth season started on Sky Uno on 20 October 2011 and ended on 5 January 2012. It was the first season to be broadcast on a digital satellite television platform, after four seasons televised on state owned channel Rai 2. For the first time, the final was also broadcast in 3D.

The show was presented by Alessandro Cattelan, with spin-off Xtra Factor hosted by Max Novaresi and Brenda Lodigiani. Elio was the only judge from the previous season to return. Mara Maionchi, Anna Tatangelo and Enrico Ruggeri was replaced by new judge Arisa and original judges Simona Ventura and Morgan. The winner was Francesca Michielin, mentored by Ventura, and her debut single "Distratto" was released as a digital EP the day after the final, together with the ones by the remaining Top 6 contestants.

The competition was split into several stages: auditions, bootcamp, judges' houses and live shows. The first auditions took place in Milan on 5 July 2011. On 12 September 2011, contestants performed for the first time in front of an audience, at the Teatro della Luna in Milan. After the auditions, 113 acts were admitted to the bootcamp, and only 24 of them make it to the judge's house. Following bootcamp, successful contestants were split into four categories: Boys (male soloists aged 16 to 24), Girls (female soloists aged 16 to 24), Over 24s (soloists aged 25 and over) and Vocal Groups. Each judge mentored six acts through judges' houses, and eliminated three of them before the first live show. The live shows started on 17 November 2011. The final took place on 5 January 2012 and it was watched by 1,048,358 people, making it the highest rated show to be broadcast by Sky Uno.

== Judges ==
The fifth edition maintained the new formula with four judges return to the jury Simona Ventura and Morgan, were confirmed Elio and newcomer Arisa. Just as in the previous edition, at time of disposal, if there were to be a tie, will be used to tilt or to a televoting period of 200 seconds that will decide the eliminated.

== Judges Houses ==
Before proceeding with the final stage of selection, each judge would be assigned one of the four categories. Each judge, with his or her vocal coach, would have to choose three singers who would complete the live shows of the fifth edition of X Factor.

The twelve eliminated acts were:

- Boys: Steven Patrick Piu, Daniel Adomako, Jeremy Fiumefreddo
- Girls: Nadia Burzotta, Paola Marotta, Alessia De Vito
- 25+: Michele Leonardo Cavada, Tania Furia, Paolo Bernardini
- Groups: Mescla, 2080, I Malviventi

== Contestants and categories ==
Key:

– Winner
– Runner-up
– Third place

Category (mentor)	Acts		
Boys (Morgan)	Valerio De Rosa	Vincenzo Di Bella	Davide Papasidero
Girls (Ventura)	Jessica Mazzoli	Francesca Michielin	Nicole Tuzii
25+ (Arisa)	Claudio Cera	Rahma Hafsi	Antonella Lo Coco
Groups (Elio)	Cafè Margot	Le 5	I Moderni

== Live shows ==
=== Results summary ===
The number of votes received by each act was released by Sky Italia after the final.

Colour key

–	Contestant was in the bottom two/three and had to sing again in the final showdown
–	Contestant was in the bottom three but received the fewest votes and was immediately eliminated
–	Contestant received the fewest public votes and was immediately eliminated (no final showdown)
–	Contestant received the most public votes

Weekly results per contestant
Contestant	Week 1		Week 2		Week 3		Week 4		Week 5^{1}		Quarter-final		Semi-final		Final	
Contestant	Part 1	Part 2	Part 1	Part 2	Part 1	Part 2	Part 1	Part 2	Round 1	Round 2	Round 1	Round 2	Round 1	Round 2	Round 1	Round 2
Francesca Michielin	2nd 24.89%	—N/a	1st 26.71%	—N/a	—N/a	1st 26.55%	1st 25.78%	—N/a	5th 12.78%	—N/a	3rd 18.55%	1st 23.80%	1st 24.65%	2nd 26.84%	1st 38.92%	Winner; 57.91%
I Moderni	—N/a	3rd 19.44%	—N/a	4th 16.02%	—N/a	3rd 18.16%	—N/a	4th 22.33%	1st 18.08%	—N/a	2nd 18.92%	3rd 22.91%	3rd 24.44%	3rd 24.69%	2nd 32.33%	Runner-up; 42.09%
Antonella Lo Coco	—N/a	2nd 20.61%	—N/a	1st 28.48%	2nd 27.29%	—N/a	—N/a	1st 28.60%	2nd 14.60%	—N/a	1st 21.03%	2nd 23.26%	2nd 24.61%	1st 27.32%	3rd 28.75%	Eliminated (final)
Nicole Tuzii	1st 33.77%	—N/a	—N/a	2nd 27.74%	1st 31.76%	—N/a	2nd 25.49%	—N/a	4th 12.92%	—N/a	4th 15.86%	4th 15.54%	5th 13.04%	4th 21.15%	Eliminated (semi-final)	
Jessica Mazzoli	—N/a	1st 21.90%	2nd 19.14%	—N/a	—N/a	4th 17.19%	—N/a	3rd 24.10%	3rd 14.35%	—N/a	5th 13.82%	5th 14.50%	4th 13.26%	Eliminated (semi-final)		
Vincenzo Di Bella	3rd 13.67%	—N/a	3rd 18.85%	—N/a	3rd 16.94%	—N/a	4th 14.41%	—N/a	8th 7.41%	39.30%	6th 11.82%	—N/a	Eliminated (quarter-final)			
Claudio Cera	4th 10.81%	—N/a	4th 18.11%	—N/a	—N/a	2nd 22.08%	3rd 20.02%	—N/a	6th 10.30%	17.81%	Eliminated (Week 5)					
Valerio De Rosa	—N/a	4th 14.36%	—N/a	5th 10.55%	—N/a	5th 16.02%	—N/a	2nd 24.97%	7th 9.56%	42.89%	Eliminated (Week 5)					
Cafè Margot	5th 10.66%	—N/a	—N/a	3rd 17.22%	4th 13.15%	—N/a	5th 14.31%	—N/a	Eliminated (Week 4)							
Davide Papasidero	—N/a	5th 12.18%	5th 8.87%	—N/a	5th 10.85%	—N/a	Eliminated (Week 3)									
Le 5	—N/a	6th 11.51%	6th 8.32%	—N/a	Eliminated (Week 2)											
Rahma Hafsi	6th 6.20%	—N/a	Eliminated (Week 1)													
Bottom two	Rahma Hafsi, Le 5		Le 5, Valerio De Rosa		Davide Papasidero, Valerio De Rosa		Cafè Margot, I Moderni		Claudio Cera, Vincenzo Di Bella		Vincenzo Di Bella, Jessica Mazzoli		Jessica Mazzoli, Nicole Tuzii	No final showdown or judges' vote: results were based on public votes alone		
Judges' vote to eliminate														No final showdown or judges' vote: results were based on public votes alone		
Arisa's vote	Le 5		Valerio De Rosa		Davide Papasidero		Cafè Margot		Vincenzo Di Bella		Vincenzo Di Bella		Nicole Tuzii	No final showdown or judges' vote: results were based on public votes alone		
Elio's vote	Rahma Hafsi		Valerio De Rosa		Davide Papasidero		Cafè Margot		Claudio Cera		Vincenzo Di Bella		Jessica Mazzoli	No final showdown or judges' vote: results were based on public votes alone		
Morgan's vote	Rahma Hafsi		Le 5		Valerio De Rosa		I Moderni		Claudio Cera		Jessica Mazzoli		Nicole Tuzii	No final showdown or judges' vote: results were based on public votes alone		
Ventura's vote	Rahma Hafsi		Le 5		Davide Papasidero		Cafè Margot		Claudio Cera		Vincenzo Di Bella		Jessica Mazzoli	No final showdown or judges' vote: results were based on public votes alone		
Eliminated	Rahma Hafsi; 3 of 4 votes majority		Le 5 Public vote 65.79% to eliminate		Davide; Papasidero; 3 of 4 votes majority		Cafè Margot; 3 of 4 votes majority		Valerio De Rosa; Public vote 42.89% to eliminate		Vincenzo Di Bella; 3 of 4 votes majority		Jessica Mazzoli; Public vote 56.19 to eliminate	Nicole Tuzii; Public vote 21.15% to save	Antonella; Lo Coco; Public vote 28.75% to win	I Moderni; Public vote 42.09% to win
Eliminated	Rahma Hafsi; 3 of 4 votes majority		Le 5 Public vote 65.79% to eliminate		Davide; Papasidero; 3 of 4 votes majority		Cafè Margot; 3 of 4 votes majority		Claudio Cera; 3 of 4 votes majority		Vincenzo Di Bella; 3 of 4 votes majority		Jessica Mazzoli; Public vote 56.19 to eliminate	Nicole Tuzii; Public vote 21.15% to save	Antonella; Lo Coco; Public vote 28.75% to win	Francesca Michielin; Public vote 57.91% to win

Notes

- ^1 During week 5, after the first round, the public was asked to vote the act to be eliminated, and not the act to be saved, among the three contestants who received fewer votes.

=== Live show details ===
==== Week 1 (17 November 2011) ====
- Celebrity performers: Kasabian ("Days Are Forgotten")
- Other guests: Miguel Bosé
- Group performance: "Pride (In the Name of Love)"

Contestants' performances on the first live show
Part 1
Act	Order	Song	Result
Nicole Tuzii	1	"And I Am Telling You I'm Not Going"	Safe
Cafè Margot	2	"50mila"	Safe
Claudio Cera	3	"My Immortal"	Safe
Vincenzo Di Bella	4	"Azzurro"	Safe
Francesca Michielin	5	"Someone Like You"	Safe
Rahma Hafsi	6	"Street Life"	Bottom two
Part 2
Act	Order	Song	Result
Valerio De Rosa	7	"Misfit"	Safe
I Moderni	8	"Overdose (d'amore)"	Safe
Antonella Lo Coco	9	"What Else Is There?"	Safe
Jessica Mazzoli	10	"Caffè nero bollente"	Safe
Davide Papasidero	11	"My Way"	Safe
Le 5	12	"Birdland"	Bottom two
Final showdown details
Act	Order	Songs	Result
Rahma Hafsi	13	"Blame It on the Boogie"	Eliminated
Rahma Hafsi	15	"Se c'è una cosa che mi fa impazzire" (a cappella)	Eliminated
Le 5	14	"I Get Around"	Safe
Le 5	16	"Come foglie" (a cappella)	Safe

Judge's vote to eliminate

- Arisa: Le 5 – backed his own act, Rahma Hafsi.
- Elio: Rahma Hafsi – backed his own act, Le 5.
- Morgan: Rahma Hafsi – based on the final showdown performance.
- Ventura: Rahma Hafsi – wanted to support Le 5's musical projects.

==== Week 2 (24 November 2011) ====
- Celebrity performers: James Morrison ("I Won't Let You Go")
- Other guests: Francesco Mandelli and Fabrizio Biggio (I soliti idioti)

Contestants' performances on the second live show
Part 1
Act	Order	Song	Result
Claudio Cera	1	"Dog Days Are Over"	Safe
Jessica Mazzoli	2	"Messaggio"	Safe
Davide Papasidero	3	"Jealous Guy"	Safe
Le 5	4	"Single Ladies (Put a Ring on It)"	Bottom two
Francesca Michielin	5	"La guerra è finita"	Safe
Vincenzo Di Bella	6	"Ritornerai"	Safe
Part 2
Act	Order	Song	Result
I Moderni	7	"I Gotta Feeling"	Safe
Antonella Lo Coco	8	"Morirò d'amore"	Safe
Valerio De Rosa	9	"Don't Let Me Be Misunderstood"	Bottom two
Cafè Margot	10	"It's Oh So Quiet"	Safe
Nicole Tuzii	11	"La differenza tra me e te"	Safe
Final showdown detail
Act	Order	Songs	Result
Le 5	12	"Because"	Eliminated
Le 5	14	"La donna cannone" (a cappella)	Eliminated
Valerio De Rosa	13	"Come il sole all'improvviso"	Safe
Valerio De Rosa	15	"All in Love Is Fair" (a cappella)	Safe

Judge's vote to eliminate

- Elio: Valerio De Rosa – backed his own act, Le 5.
- Morgan: Le 5 – backed his own act, Valerio De Rosa.
- Ventura: Le 5 – felt that Le 5 still needed to find their right musical direction.
- Arisa: Valerio De Rosa – could not decide so chose to take it to deadlock.

With both acts receiving two votes each, the result went to deadlock and a new public vote commenced for 200 seconds. Le 5 were eliminated as the act with the fewest public votes.

==== Week 3 (1 December 2011) ====
- Theme: Disco Party
- Celebrity performers: Giorgia ("È l'amore che conta")
- Group performance: Hung Up

Contestants' performances on the third live show
Part 1
Act	Order	Song	Result
Antonella Lo Coco	1	"Strict Machine"	Safe
Davide Papasidero	2	"Never Be Alone (We Are Your Friends)"	Bottom two
Nicole Tuzii	3	"Born This Way"	Safe
Cafè Margot	4	"Crying at the Discoteque"	Safe
Vincenzo Di Bella	5	"Miss You"	Safe
Part 2
Act	Order	Song	Result
Jessica Mazzoli	6	"Slave to the Rhythm"	Safe
Valerio De Rosa	7	"The Look of Love"	Bottom two
I Moderni	8	"Judas"	Safe
Francesca Michielin	9	"Tainted Love"	Safe
Claudio Cera	10	"If I Ever Feel Better"	Safe
Final showdown detail
Act	Order	Songs	Result
Davide Papasidero	11	"Cuore"	Eliminated
Davide Papasidero	13	"True Colors" (a cappella)	Eliminated
Valerio De Rosa	12	"Superstition"	Safe
Valerio De Rosa	14	"Sembra impossibile" (a cappella)	Safe

Judges' votes to eliminate

- Morgan: Valerio De Rosa – gave no reason but stated that he hoped for a deadlock.
- Ventura: Davide Papasidero – to balance Morgan's vote, hoping for a deadlock.
- Arisa: Davide Papasidero – stated that she preferred De Rosa.
- Elio: Davide Papasidero – based on the final showdown performances.

==== Week 4 (8 December 2011) ====
- Celebrity performers: Daniele Silvestri ("Questo Paese" and "Il flamenco della doccia" with Elio), Morgan with Davide Papasidero ("Life on Mars?")

Contestants' performances on the fourth live show
Part 1
Act	Order	Song	Result
Nicole Tuzii	1	"Heaven"	Safe
Vincenzo Di Bella	2	"Portatemi Dio"	Safe
Claudio Cera	3	"Mi sei scoppiato dentro il cuore"	Safe
Cafè Margot	4	"Senza paura"	Bottom two
Francesca Michielin	5	"Higher Ground"	Safe
Part 2
Act	Order	Song	Result
I Moderni	6	"Back It Up"	Bottom two
Jessica Mazzoli	7	"Folle città"	Safe
Valerio De Rosa	8	"Cigarettes and Coffee"	Safe
Antonella Lo Coco	9	"Mad About You"	Safe
Final showdown detail
Act	Order	Songs	Result
Café Margot	10	"It's Oh So Quiet"	Eliminated
Café Margot	12	"Illusione" (a cappella)	Eliminated
I Moderni	11	"In the Air Tonight"	Safe
I Moderni	13	"Domani" (a cappella)	Safe

Judges' votes to eliminate

- Elio: Cafè Margot – felt he could be more helpful for I Moderni.
- Arisa: Cafè Margot – based on the final showdown performances.
- Morgan: I Moderni – felt that Cafè Margot's performance was "too redundant", but that they had potential to improve with their mentor's help.
- Ventura: Cafè Margot – thinking that I Moderni were more interesting for the recording industry.

==== Week 5 (15 December 2011) ====
- Celebrity performers: Subsonica ("Up Patriots to Arms"), Raphael Gualazzi ("Zuccherino dolce")

Contestants' performances on the fifth live show
Part 1
Act	Order	Song	Result
Jessica Mazzoli	1	"Sally"	Safe
I Moderni	2	"Fuck You"	Safe
Valerio De Rosa	3	"Un bimbo sul leone"	Bottom three
Antonella Lo Coco	4	"Missing"	Safe
Francesca Michielin	5	"Confusa e felice"	Safe
Vincenzo Di Bella	6	"Time"	Bottom three
Nicole Tuzii	7	"Io non lascio traccia"	Safe
Claudio Cera	8	"Una poesia anche per te"	Bottom three
Final showdown detail
Act	Order	Songs	Result
Valerio De Rosa	9	"Labyrinth"	Eliminated (public vote)
Vincenzo Di Bella	10	"Anna e Marco"	Safe
Vincenzo Di Bella	12	"Washing of the Water" (a cappella)	Safe
Claudio Cera	11	"Se stasera sono qui"	Eliminated (judges)
Claudio Cera	13	"The Scientist" (a cappella)	Eliminated (judges)

Judges' votes to eliminate

- Morgan: Claudio Cera – backed his own act, Vincenzo Di Bella.
- Arisa: Vincenzo Di Bella – backed her own act, Claudio Cera.
- Ventura: Claudio Cera – felt that Cera was ready for the music business outside of the show.
- Elio: Claudio Cera – felt that Cera was not focused on a particular style.

==== Week 6: Quarter-final (22 December 2011) ====
- Theme: Songs from films (Round 1), Free choice (Round 2)
- Celebrity performers: Marco Mengoni ("Tanto il resto cambia")
- Group performance: "Do They Know It's Christmas?"

Contestants' performances on the sixth live show
Round 1
Act	Order	Song	Film	Result
Antonella Lo Coco	1	"The World Is Not Enough"	The World Is Not Enough	Safe
Francesca Michielin	2	"The House of the Rising Sun"	Casino	Safe
I Moderni	3	"Diamonds Are a Girl's Best Friend"	Moulin Rouge!	Safe
Jessica Mazzoli	4	"Un año d'amor"	High Heels	Safe
Vincenzo Di Bella	5	"Suspicious Minds"	Breathless	Bottom two
Nicole Tuzii	6	"Cry Me a River"	V for Vendetta	Safe
Round 2
Act	Order	Song		Result
Nicole Tuzii	7	"Ain't Nobody"		Safe
Jessica Mazzoli	8	"We Don't Need Another Hero"		Bottom two
I Moderni	9	"Don't Go Breaking My Heart"		Safe
Francesca Michielin	10	"You Shook Me All Night Long"		Safe
Antonella Lo Coco	11	"Disincanto"		Safe
Final showdown detail
Act	Order	Songs		Result
Vincenzo Di Bella	12	"La leva calcistica della classe '68"		Eliminated
Vincenzo Di Bella	14	"Red Rain" (a cappella)		Eliminated
Jessica Mazzoli	13	"Malo"		Safe
Jessica Mazzoli	15	"Il corvo" (a cappella)		Safe

Judges' vote to eliminate

- Ventura: Vincenzo Di Bella – backed her own act, Jessica Mazzoli.
- Morgan: Jessica Mazzoli – backed his own act, Vincenzo Di Bella.
- Arisa: Vincenzo Di Bella – stated that she preferred Mazzoli.
- Elio: Vincenzo Di Bella – took his previous comments on the two acts into consideration.

==== Week 7: Semi-final (29 December 2011) ====
- Theme: Previously unreleased songs (Round 1), Free choice (Round 2)
- Celebrity performers: Antonello Venditti ("Unica"), Morgan ("Lontano lontano")

Contestants' performances on the seventh live show
Round 1
Act	Order	Song	Writer(s)	Result
Nicole Tuzii	1	"Sarà possibile"	Luca Mattioni, Mario Cianchi, Kaballà	Bottom two
Antonella Lo Coco	2	"Cuore scoppiato"	Luca Marino	Safe
Jessica Mazzoli	3	"Un livido sul cuore"	Gianluca Grignani	Bottom two
I Moderni	4	"Non ci penso mai"	Daniele Lazzarin, Riccardo Garifo, Alberto Tafuri	Safe
Francesca Michielin	5	"Distratto"	Elisa, Roberto Casalino	Safe
Final showdown detail
Act	Order	Song		Result
Nicole Tuzii	6	"Listen"		Safe
Jessica Mazzoli	7	"Folle città"		Eliminated

Judges' votes to eliminate

- Ventura: Jessica Mazzoli – gave no reason but said she hoped for a deadlock.
- Morgan: Nicole Tuzii – gave no reason.
- Arisa: Nicole Tuzii – gave no reason.
- Elio: Jessica Mazzoli – could not decide so chose to take it to deadlock.

With both acts receiving two votes each, the result went to deadlock and a new public vote commenced for 200 seconds. Jessica Mazzoli was eliminated as the act with the fewest public votes.

Round 2
Act	Order	Song 1	Order	Song 2 (a cappella)	Result
Francesca Michielin	8	"Roadhouse Blues"	12	"Che cosa c'è"	Safe
I Moderni	9	"I Want You Back"	13	"My Love"	Safe
Antonella Lo Coco	10	"Total Eclipse of the Heart"	14	"Roxanne"	Safe
Nicole Tuzii	11	"(You Make Me Feel Like) A Natural Woman"	15	"Fa che non sia mai"	Eliminated

==== Week 8: Final (5 January 2012) ====
- Theme: Celebrity duets (Round 1, part 1), previously unreleased songs (Round 1, part 2), Medley of the best performances on X Factor
- Celebrity performers: Fiorella Mannoia ("Io non ho paura"), Morgan & Asia Argento ("The Indifferences"), Arisa, Elio, Morgan & Simona Ventura ("Spirit in the Sky")

Contestants' performances on the eighth live show
Round 1
Act	Order	Song 1	Order	Song 2	Result
Francesca Michielin	1	"La tua ragazza sempre" (with Irene Grandi)	4	"Distratto"	Safe
I Moderni	2	"Heaven" (with Emeli Sandé)	5	"Non ci penso mai"	Safe
Antonella Lo Coco	3	"Come si cambia" (with Fiorella Mannoia)	6	"Cuore scoppiato"	Third place
Round 2
Act	Order	Medley	Order	Song (a cappella)	Result
Francesca Michielin	7	"Someone Like You", "The House of the Rising Sun", "Whole Lotta Love"	9	"Hallelujah"	Winner
I Moderni	8	"Diamonds Are a Girl's Best Friend", "Fuck You", "Judas"	10	"Another One Bites the Dust"	Runner-up
