= Ma il cielo è sempre più blu =

Single by Rino Gaetano
- Released: 1975
- Genre: Pop rock
- Label: It
- Songwriter: Rino Gaetano

Rino Gaetano singles chronology
| "Tu, forse non essenzialmente tu" (1974) | "Ma il cielo è sempre più blu" (1975) | "Mio fratello è figlio unico" (1976) |

Giusy Ferreri singles chronology
| "La scala (The Ladder)" (2009) | "Ma il cielo è sempre più blu" (2010) | "Come pensi possa amarti" (2010) |

Music video
- "Ma il cielo è sempre più blu" on YouTube

"Ma il cielo è sempre più blu" (lit. 'But the sky is getting more blue') is a 1975 song composed and performed by Rino Gaetano.

== Background ==
In spite of its length, which led to the then unusual choice of releasing the song cut in two parts as A-side and B-side, the song was the first commercial success of Gaetano; first a radio hit in the emerging Italian private radio stations, the song eventually was certified platinum, selling over 100,000 copies. The song's lyrics inspired the film Bits and Pieces (Il cielo è sempre più blu in Italian).

== Cover versions ==
In 2009, Giusy Ferreri released a cover version of the song as lead single of her album Fotografie.

In 2020, during the COVID-19 pandemic, the song was covered as "Ma il cielo è sempre blu" by the supergroup Italian Allstars 4 Life, as a charity single in support of the Italian Red Cross. The group consisted of Alessandra Amoroso, Annalisa, Arisa, Baby K, Claudio Baglioni, Benji & Fede, Loredana Bertè, Boomdabash, Carl Brave, Michele Bravi, Bugo, Luca Carboni, Simone Cristicchi, Gigi D'Alessio, Cristina d'Avena, Fred De Palma, Diodato, Dolcenera, Elodie, Emma Marrone, Fedez, Giusy Ferreri, Fabri Fibra, Fiorello, Francesco Gabbani, Irene Grandi, Il Volo, Izi, Paolo Jannacci, J-Ax, Emis Killa, Levante, Lo Stato Sociale, Fiorella Mannoia, Marracash, Marco Masini, Ermal Meta, Gianni Morandi, Fabrizio Moro, Nek, Noemi, Rita Pavone, Piero Pelù, Max Pezzali, Pinguini Tattici Nucleari, Pupo, Raf, Eros Ramazzotti, Francesco Renga, Samuel, Francesco Sarcina, Saturnino, Umberto Tozzi, Ornella Vanoni and Rino Gaetano's nephew Alessandro.

== Charts ==
Rino Gaetano version
| Chart (2003) | Peak position |
|---|---|
| Italy (Musica e dischi) | 27 |

Giusy Ferreri version
| Chart (2009–10) | Peak position |
|---|---|
| Italy (FIMI) | 2 |

Italian Allstars 4 Life version
| Chart (2020) | Peak position |
|---|---|
| Italy (FIMI) | 5 |
