= Shimmy Shimmy =

2021 song by Takagi & Ketra

- Official cover

Single by Takagi & Ketra featuring Giusy Ferreri
- Released: 28 May 2021
- Genre: Dance pop
- Length: 2:40
- Label: Columbia
- Composers: Takagi & Ketra; Federica Abbate
- Lyricists: Federica Abbate; Cheope
- Producers: Takagi & Ketra

Takagi & Ketra singles chronology
"Venere e Marte" (2021)	"Shimmy Shimmy" (2021)	"Panico" (2022)

Giusy Ferreri singles chronology
"La isla" (2020)	"Shimmy Shimmy" (2021)	"Gli Oasis di una volta" (2021)

Music video
- "Shimmy Shimmy" on YouTube

"Shimmy Shimmy" is a 2021 song by musical duo Takagi & Ketra, with featured vocals by Italian singer Giusy Ferreri. Written by Takagi and Ketra with Federica Abbate and Cheope, it was released on 28 May 2021.

The song peaked at number 22 in the Italian singles chart and was certified platinum in Italy.

== Music video ==
A music video was released on 16 June 2021 via the YouTube channel of Takagi & Ketra. The video was directed by Andrea Folino and shot in the desert of the Tozeur Governorate, Tunisia.

== Charts ==
=== Weekly charts ===
Weekly chart performance for "Shimmy Shimmy"
Chart (2021)	Peak position
Italy (FIMI)	22

=== Year-end charts ===
Year-end chart performance for "Shimmy Shimmy"
Chart (2021)	Position
Italy (FIMI)	75

== Certifications ==
Region	Certification	Certified units/sales
Italy (FIMI)	Platinum	70,000^{‡}
^{‡} Sales+streaming figures based on certification alone.
