= Roberto Casalino =

Italian singer-songwriter (born 1979)

- Born: 9 June 1979 (age 47); Avellino, Italy
- Genres: Pop, soul
- Occupation: Singer-songwriter
- Instruments: Vocals, guitar
- Years active: 1999 – present
- Labels: Lead Records/Venus (2004); Lead Records-NiSa/EMI (2007–2009); Universal Music Italia (2010–present)
- Website: robertocasalino.it

Roberto Casalino (born 9 June 1979) is an Italian singer-songwriter. He composed, in collaboration with Tiziano Ferro, "Non ti scordar mai di me", "Stai fermo lì" and "Novembre", brought to success in 2008 by Giusy Ferreri.

He has written songs for many Italian artists including Ferreri, Emma Marrone, Francesca Michielin, Fedez, Marco Mengoni and Tiziano Ferro.

== Biography ==
=== Early life ===
Born in Avellino, he moved to Rome with his family at the age of one and a half, and then in 1989 to Geilenkirchen, Germany, where he remained until 1993. He started playing the guitar at the age of 7 years, and in 1989 he debuted as a singer. In 1993, he returned to Italy, settling in Latina, where he began to attend musical environments. He joined in 1996 the Vibration Gospel Choir and a small band, with which he began performing in local clubs.

=== Equilibriolabile and solo career ===
In 1999, he started his own band, Equilibriolabile ("Weak balance"), which followed him on all occasions.

Throughout 2002, he accompanied Tiziano Ferro in his Rosso relativo Tour in the role of a backing singer. Another artistic collaboration took place in the summer of the same year, when he wrote "Entro il 23" for the band Mp2.

In 2003, he self-published his band's album Variazioni sul tema and a few months later he collaborated with arranger and songwriter Mario Zannini Quirini.

Participated in the selections of the Festival di Sanremo in 2004 in the section "youth", arriving among the 51 finalists with the song "The Demiurge", later included in her album L'atmosfera nascosta.

His debut on the national radio was in 2004. The single "Così non vale", produced by Lead/Venus, ranked first at the online chart for the Gran premio Della musica Italian d'estate ("Grand Prix of Summer Italian Music") 2004, a competition organised by Italy and Radio Italia and Video Italia. In July of the same year, he composed the theme song for the Giffoni Film Festival, which was then posted on his album L'atmosfera nascosta in 2009.

Between September and October 2004, Casalino joined the Tim Tour in the cities of Turin and Milan.

In 2007, he ranked among the 40 finalists of SanremoLab and among the 72 finalists of Sanremo Nuova Generazione, performing in front of the artistic committee. In 2009, he and his band performed at the prestigious music club Hope & Anchor in London.

In 2009, Casalino released his first solo album L'atmosfera nascosta, preceded by the single "L'atmosfera". The album featured fourteen tracks, of which he is the author of lyrics and music. His song "Mi vuoi bene o mi vuoi male", released on 9 October, went on to be aired on radio. He performed "L'atmofera" at the 2009 Venice Music Awards and at the 2009 Telethon Marathon, both broadcast live on Rai 2.

== Discography ==
=== Studio albums ===
- 2009 – L'atmosfera nascosta
- 2014 – E Questo É Quanto
- 2018 – Errori di felicità
- 2019 – Il fabbricante di ricordi

=== Live albums ===
- 2020 – Il Fabbricante Di Ricordi Live

=== Singles ===
- 2004 – "Così non vale"
- 2007 – "L'esatto opposto"
- 2009 – "L'atmosfera"
- 2009 – "Mi vuoi bene o mi vuoi male"
- 2014 – "Torno io se torni tu"
- 2015 – "Ogni destino è originale"
- 2017 – "Errori di felicità"
- 2018 – "Le mie giornate"
- 2018 – "Sgualcito cuore"
- 2019 – "Diamante lei e luce lui"
- 2019 – "Sul ciglio senza far rumore" (feat. Alessandra Amoroso)
- 2020 – "Cullami"

=== Writing credits ===
List of songs written for other artists
Song	Year	Artist	Album
"Entro il 23" (Written by Tiziano Ferro and Roberto Casalino)	2002	Mp2	Illogico
"E va be'" (Written by Tiziano Ferro and Roberto Casalino)	2005	Syria	Non è peccato
"Non ti scordar mai di me" / "Nunca te olvides de mi" (Written by Tiziano Ferro and Roberto Casalino)	2008	Giusy Ferreri	Non ti scordar mai di me
"Novembre" (Written by Roberto Casalino)	2008	Giusy Ferreri	Gaetana
"Stai fermo lì" / "Parado ahì" (Written by Tiziano Ferro and Roberto Casalino)	2008	Giusy Ferreri	Gaetana
"Passione positiva" / "Pasion positiva" (Written by Tiziano Ferro and Roberto Casalino)	2008	Giusy Ferreri	Gaetana
"Destinazione mare" (Written by Tiziano Ferro, Roberto Casalino and Davide Simonetta)	2022	Tiziano Ferro	Il mondo è nostro
