= Gaetana =

Studio album by Giusy Ferreri
- Released: November 14, 2008
- Genre: Pop; rock; soul
- Label: Sony BMG, Ricordi
- Producer: Giusy Ferreri, Linda Perry, Tiziano Ferro, Roberto Casalino

Giusy Ferreri chronology
Gaetana (2008)	Fotografie (2009)

Singles from Gaetana
- 1. "Non ti scordar mai di me" Released: May 30, 2008; 2. "Novembre" Released: October 17, 2008; 3. "Stai fermo lì" Released: January 16, 2009; 4. "La scala (The Ladder)" Released: May 8, 2009

Professional ratings
Review scores
Source	Rating
Allmusic	4/5 stars
Avopolis	2.5/5 stars

Gaetana is the debut album by Italian pop singer Giusy Ferreri, it was released on November 14, 2008, in Italy, and digitally in many other European countries. Four singles were released from the album: "Non ti scordar mai di me", "Novembre", "Stai fermo lì" and "La scala (The Ladder)". Gaetana has sold around 500,000 copies only in Italy being certified 6 times platinum and around 600,000 copies worldwide.

== Promotion and release ==
The album was heavily promoted, and special advertising was arranged in collaboration with MTV Italy before and during the week of release. The entire album was streamed on MTV's website, beginning on November 10, 2008, a week before the album's Italian release date. Gaetana reached at #1 on iTunes Italy on the first day of release and debuted on the Italian FIMI albums chart at number two where it went on to peak for seven weeks, fended off by Laura Pausini's album Primavera in anticipo.

In 2009 Gaetana was released in France, Belgium, Spain, Germany and Greece.

== Album information ==
Italian singer Tiziano Ferro collaborated with Giusy on the song "L'amore e basta" and wrote the songs "Stai fermo lì", "Passione positiva", "Aria di vita" and the hit single "Non ti scordar mai di me". American singer, songwriter and producer Linda Perry wrote the songs "La scala (The Ladder)", which has already been recorded with her band "4 Non Blondes" in 1994 but remained unreleased and "Cuore assente (The La La Song)".

The tracks written by Giusy Ferreri are "Pensieri", "In assenza", "Piove" and "Il party".

== Track listing ==
Italian Edition

1. "L'amore e basta!" (feat Tiziano Ferro)
2. "Novembre"
3. "Stai fermo lì"
4. "Non ti scordar mai di me"
5. "Aria di vita"
6. "Passione positiva"
7. "La scala (The Ladder)"
8. "Pensieri"
9. "In assenza"
10. "Il sapore di un altro no"
11. "Cuore assente (The La La Song)"
12. "Piove"
13. "Il party"
14. "Nunca te olvides de mí (Non ti scordar mai di me - Spanish version)" (Bonus Track)

Spanish Edition

1. "El amor y basta" (feat. Tiziano Ferro)
2. "Noviembre"
3. "Parado ahí"
4. "Nunca te olvides de mí"
5. "Aire de vida"
6. "Pasión positiva"
7. "La scala (The Ladder)"
8. "Pensamientos"
9. "En ausencia de ti"
10. "La amargura de otro no"
11. "Cuore assente"
12. "Llueve"
13. "El party"

== Collaborations ==
- Linda Perry
- Tiziano Ferro
- Sergio Cammariere
- Roberto Casalino

== Release history ==
Region	Date	Label
Italy	14 November 2008	Sony BMG, Ricordi
Switzerland	14 November 2008	Sony BMG
Greece	21 January 2009	Sony BMG
France	25 May 2009	Sony BMG
Belgium	25 May 2009	Sony BMG, Ariola
Germany	12 June 2009	Sony BMG, Ariola
Spain	16 June 2009	Sony BMG, Columbia

== Charts and certifications ==
Chart (2008)	Providers	Peak position	Certification	Sales
Belgium (Wallonia) Albums	Ultratop/IFPI	52		5.000
Cyprus Albums Chart	IFPI	5		5.000
Greece International Albums	IFPI	2	2xPlatinum	15,000+
Greece Albums Chart	IFPI	10	2xPlatinum	15,000+
Italian Albums Chart	FIMI	2	Diamond (7× platinum)	560,000+
Swiss Albums Chart	Media Control	20		5,000+
