= Rino Gaetano =

Italian musician (1950–1981)

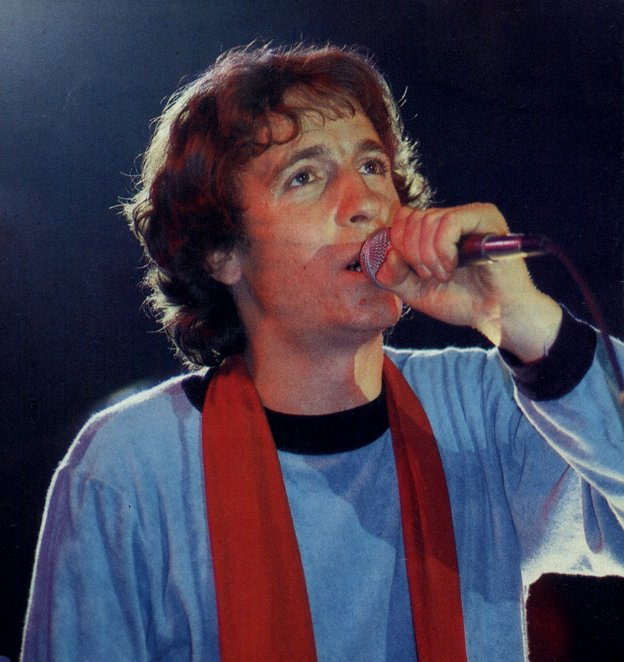
- Rino Gaetano in 1981

Background information
- Born: Salvatore Antonio Gaetano; 29 October 1950; Crotone, Italy
- Died: 2 June 1981 (aged 30) Rome, Italy
- Genres: Rock; reggae; pop
- Occupation: Singer-songwriter
- Instruments: Vocals; guitar; piano; ukulele
- Years active: 1973–1981
- Labels: It; RCA Italiana
- Website: www.rinogaetano.it

Salvatore Antonio "Rino" Gaetano (29 October 1950 – 2 June 1981) was an Italian musician and singer-songwriter. He is known for his surreal, allusive lyrics that carried sharp social and political critique beneath popular, catchy melodies.

He is remembered for his raspy voice, for the heavily ironic lyrics of his songs and his social protests. He died in a car accident at age 30. He was a popular and influential figure, widely re-evaluated by the following teen generations.

== Biography ==
Salvatore Antonio Gaetano was born in Crotone, Calabria. At the time of his birth, his family had just returned to Calabria after spending a period of displacement—common to many of their fellow citizens—in Dolo due to the ravages of World War II, where his older sister Anna was born. In the family, he was often called “Salvatorino,” but Anna preferred to call him by an even shorter nickname, “Rino,” which over time became the only name she used for him in everyday life.

In March 1960, at the age of ten, his family moved to Rome, where he would spend the rest of his life. In 1961, he was sent to study at the seminary Piccola Opera del Sacro Cuore of Narni, in the province of Terni, where, under the guidance of his teacher Renato Simeoni, he began to show his flair for writing poetry. Far from his family, Rino composed the short poem E l'uomo volò ("The Man Flew"). His teacher remembers him thus:

[Gaetano] understood the importance of studying, but he also had moments of great absence, which was not emptiness. It was very difficult to find Rino in situations of “emptiness”; he was always mentally occupied. There were tastes, this is how I always saw him, tastes within this person, his personal pursuits that kept him busy. He was quite a dreamy lad, very dreamy.

By 1967, he had finished school and returned to Rome, settling in the quarter of Monte Sacro, where he would live until his death, first in Via Cimone and then, from 1970, in Via Nomentana Nuova 53, where a plaque was placed in 2011 to commemorate the 30th anniversary of his death.

In 1968, Gaetano created a quartet with a group of friends called Krounks. The group mainly played cover songs and Rino played bass and enjoyed writing songs in his spare time. They were inspired by Italian artists such as Enzo Jannacci, Fabrizio De André, Adriano Celentano, I Gufi, Gian Pieretti and Ricky Gianco as well as international musicians such as Bob Dylan and The Beatles, as can be read on the title page of a notebook containing chords and songs Rino wrote during this period.

In 1969, Gaetano approached Folkstudio, a well-known club in Rome for promoting young artists. Here he met Antonello Venditti, Ernesto Bassignano and Francesco De Gregori. As he recounted, His style proved very different from that of the other musicians, and his strong use of irony caused concerns for the club managers:

"When I sang at Folkstudio, I was already the center of discussion... in fact they did not want me to do many of my pieces because, as they said, it seemed like I just wanted to make fun of everyone."

Bassignano also recalls:

He adopted an atypical, clownish style, but he did not perform cabaret. He continually desecrated pop music and, for all these reasons, he was unthinkable for the Folkstudio audience.

During that same period, Gaetano often performed alongside Venditti in cabaret shows organised by Marcello Casco.

Gaetano was a multi-talented performer and, during the early 1970s, he performed in cabarets and took part in several plays in addition to gigging. He played the role of Estragon in Samuel Beckett's Waiting for Godot, the Fox in a production of Pinocchio by Italian director Carmelo Bene, and recited poetry by Majakovsky.

Gaetano was an accomplished actor, developing much of his subsequent stage style and writing technique through his theatre experience. He was inspired by German kabarett, a form of theatre excelling in political satire. Wikipedia describes this as "unlike comedians who make fun of all kind of things, Kabarett artists (German: Kabarettisten) pride themselves as dedicated almost completely to political and social topics of more serious nature which they criticize using techniques like cynicism, sarcasm and irony." They were able to deal with social themes and political developments through their acts, something that inspired Gaetano and can be seen in many of his concepts and staging, for example, in his song Aida/Spendi spandi effendi regarding the oil crisis of the 1970s. It enabled him to make political observations while avoiding censorship. Gaetano cited Ionesco as his favourite playwright, one of the foremost writers of Theatre of the Absurd, saying that he explored the usual problem of the inability to truly communicate, isolation and exclusion. He developed a comedy act with his friend Bruno Francelleschi, 'Ad esempio a me piace...' (For Example, I Like...), as a mixture of theatre and music.

In addition to his performing, Gaetano studied accountancy, encouraged by his father to pursue a secure career in banking. Gaetano asked for one more year to break into music and in 1972, he registered with the SIAE and met Vincenzo Micocci, owner of the record label It. In the same year, Gaetano recorded his first 45 rpm record with the Milan-based Produttori Associati containing the songs "Jacqueline" and "La ballata di Renzo", a song which features lyrics that echo details of his own death. The disc was not printed and Gaetano signed with Vincenzo Micocci, releasing his first single in 1973, I Love You Maryanna/Jaqueline (with "Jaqueline" on the B-side) produced by RosVeMon, the surnames of Aurelio Rossitto, Antonello Venditti and Piero Montanari. In this song, Gaetano exhibits his multicultural education, singing in four languages – English, Italian, German and French. Rino decided to release the single under the pseudonym of Kammamuri's as tribute to a character in Pirates of Malaysia by Emilio Salgari. According to Micocci the choice of using a pseudonym was a sign of shyness and insecurity of Gaetano. The singer-songwriter seemed to be rather doubtful, especially about his singing abilities and therefore about the possibility of singing his own songs. Gaetano was not particularly in tune; suffice it to say that in middle school in Narni, he was excluded from the seminary choir. However, according to many experts in the field, it was precisely his natural and “rough” singing style that gave his songs such intensity.

Micocci said:

"He considered himself a writer, not a singer. He believed he didn't have a good voice, so that after the release of I Love You Marianna, when the time came to record his first album, he came and told me that it would be better to get someone else to sing the songs. I, of course, I laughed and sent him in the studio."

In 1974 Rino met Bruno Franceschelli, with whom he developed a close friendship. Bruno recalls their first meeting as follows:

It was the early 1970s when Rino and I met for the first time in a bar in Montesacro, our neighbourhood. In that bar, I was “playing draughts” while Rino was “drinking lager from a can”. The bar was called Il Barone. I could describe that meeting as two people who had been searching for each other for a long time finally finding each other.

Gaetano described the atmosphere of the bar mentioned by Franceschelli in the song Tu, forse non essenzialmente tu (You, perhaps not essentially you). The album cover shows the singer, in a deliberately blurred image, walking in front of a brick wall of his first home in Rome, with a sign hanging on a door that reads “Ingresso libero” (Free entry). The title alludes to Gaetano's entry into the world of music.

The album was not particularly successful, while the single taken from the album, Tu, forse non essenzialmente tu/I tuoi occhi sono pieni di sale (You, perhaps not essentially you/Your eyes are full of salt), was more successful, capturing the attention of Renzo Arbore and Gianni Boncompagni, who played the two tracks several times on their radio programme Alto gradimento. Compared to the first single, the songs on this new album showed greater social commitment and embraced themes such as marginalisation and industrial alienation.

In 1974, Gaetano published his first album, Ingresso libero. The LP featured many of the themes that would characterise his work, such as issues of isolation, marginalisation and exclusion, as well as his lively style and intelligent, witty lyrics. His songs began to be played on radio stations and in the same year, through record company RCA, Gaetano wrote three songs for Nicola Di Bari "Prova a chiamarmi amore", "Questo amore così grande" and "Ad esempio a me piace... il Sud", included in the album Ti fa bella l'amore. None of the three achieved great success in Italy, The song Ad esempio a me piace... il Sud took part in Canzonissima but was eliminated in the early stages, while the Spanish version, "Por ejemplo", achieved success in Latin America.

Success for Gaetano came in 1975 with the 45 rpm hit record "Ma il cielo è sempre più blu" ("But the sky is always bluer"), which sold 100,000 copies that year alone. It is the most famous and instantly recognisable of his songs. Unusually, the 45 contained only one song, but it was split into two. In this song Gaetano offers several pictures of everyday life, with irony, clichés and contradictions. In September 1975, the singer explained some of this thinking in an article in the weekly Italian music magazine, Ciao 2001: "These pictures are sad, never happy, because I wanted to emphasise that nowadays there are few cheerful things and it is for this reason that I take into account those who die at work. Even the verse "who plays Sanremo" is sad and negative, because anyone who plays Sanremo, doesn't think of those who "live in barracks".

The song marked Gaetano's first big hit, but the singer's popularity was still very limited. In fact, the same article states:

This is a song that many people hum or whistle even though they do not know who wrote it.

Gaetano began performing live more and more frequently, mainly opening concerts for Venditti and other established singers. That same year, he also wrote a two-act play with Bruno Franceschelli entitled Ad esempio a me piace…, a sort of mix between music and theatre. In an interview at the time, he said:

In the upcoming months, a single entitled Berta filava and an LP entitled Mio fratello è figlio unico will be released. But first I have another important commitment: I will be performing in the theatre with my friend Bruno Franceschelli, revisiting the usual themes of incommunicability, isolation and exclusion.

However, due to various problems, the play was never staged. In 2003, co-author Bruno Franceschelli and Gaetano's sister Anna suggested to Sergio Cammariere that he stage the play. Cammariere later recalled: "[Rino] and Bruno Franceschelli had written a play based on that music. He and Anna, Rino's sister, asked me to stage it. I'm busy with the summer tour and then I'll be working on the new album, but I'd love to do it."

=== Mio fratello è figlio unico and Aida ===
In 1976 Gaetano recorded his second album, Mio fratello è figlio unico (My Brother is an Only Child). With this album, he tries to capture the listener's attention with dramatic narratives, especially loneliness and alienation, the main themes of the album. On the album, Gaetano began to explore new sounds and instruments including the sitar, the banjo and the mandolin, enabling him to obtain a more complex and mature album. In a review published by Ciao 2001 shortly after the album's release, it states that:

"His second album, Mio fratello è figlio unico, already widely programmed by radio stations, is much more mature and personal than his previous album. Gaetano is an atypical figure: there is the difficulty of finding genres to fit him into, trends in which to place him, which is the best compliment that you can give. The music, made a few chords, is built intelligently and pleasantly. The voice is aggressive, deliberately crude words are fun, the lyrics have allegories, the visual images are faster, like photography." (Enzo Caffarelli)

A few months after the album's release, It organised a tour with Perigeo. However, this decision by the record company did not convince either the public or the critics. In the same year, Gaetano gave an unreleased song, Sandro trasportando, to Carmelita Gadaleta, another singer under contract with It.

The following year Gaetano recorded his third album, Aida. The choice of the name refers to the work of the great Italian opera composer Giuseppe Verdi, but for Gaetano, Aida is the embodiment of all women and of Italy itself. Through the figure of Aida, Rino researches and recounts moments in Italian history with a completely original, almost photographic, observation. In August, the magazine Ciao 2001 described the album as the “result of a pleasant encounter between impromptu lyrics, cheerful though somewhat bitter, and pleasant, unobtrusive music, designed to emphasise particular moments”.

While on tour, Gaetano was joined by the emerging band, Crash, and he produced their album Exstasis and wrote their song Marziani noi (Us Martians). With his increasing rise in popularity, he made his first major television appearance on the entertainment programme, Domenica in (Sunday), presented by the Italian TV presenter Corrado Mantoni, singing "Aida/Spendi spandi effendi" and on that occasion, he was forced to remove the word ‘coglione’ from the lyrics.

On 19 August, he was invited to appear on the programme Auditorio A with Gino Paoli, who introduced him as follows:

I would like to introduce you to a friend who came to visit me and who amuses me. He amuses me because he is the heir to a certain type of nonsense, of marinetterie, of the oldest surrealism. His name is Rino Gaetano.

On that occasion, the singer-songwriter performed the songs Spendi spandi effendi (this time uncensored) and then Aida. Rino famously appeared bearing a petrol pump and wearing a striped T-shirt (which recalled the first song) and a colonial style safari hat (allusion to the verse from Aida “and then twenty years of safaris”).

The choice to dress in a colourful manner during television appearances later became one of his trademarks; years later, Jovanotti affirmed:

I remember everything. The Sanremo (sic.), the top hat and striped shirt, the explorer's hat. I love hats, and perhaps it's his fault.

=== Sanremo Music Festival ===
Although not generally recognised outside of Italy, the Sanremo Music Festival is a popular annual song contest. Due to its pop music roots and pop culture positioning, it was not felt to be a route for a serious musician. The idea of bringing Rino Gaetano to the Sanremo Festival came from Vittorio Salvetti, creator of the Festivalbar, and Ennio Melis, artistic director of RCA. Pressure from RCA encouraged Gaetano to take part. He chose his new song Nuntereggae più. It was a highly innovative half-sung/ half-spoken proto-rap against several Italian sportsmen, politicians and other high-profile figures. However, the producers of the show forced him to drop the song, due to its now famous list of prominent Italians which it criticised, and swap the song with Gianna, a more light-hearted and musically catchier one. Gaetano did not appreciate this song very much, considering it too commercial and musically too similar to Berta filava, but in the end the record company managed to assert its opinion.

On 26 January 1978, Gaetano appeared on stage at Sanremo wearing a black top hat (given to him by Renato Zero a few days earlier), evening dress red and white sneakers and bearing a ukulele. He wore a huge number of medals pinned to the lapel of his tailcoat, which he handed over to the conductor during the performance and threw to the audience. The performance of Gianna, also included the first time the word 'sex' was used onstage at Sanremo. Towards the end of the song, the band Pandemonium appeared unexpectedly onstage to sing the chorus.

Later discussing his performance at Sanremo, Gaetano remarked:

The festival is a walkway and like all walkways, it gives you three minutes to make a speech that you would normally do in a two hour show. So you have to find a way. For my part, I have chosen the way of paradox, a bit like Carmelo Bene.

— Rino vive – Ma il cielo è sempre più blu, RAI 2, 2007

Bruno Franceschelli recalls the event: "The performance in Sanremo, from my point of view, was a demonstration of his talent as an artist. He brought a new air, funny and irreverent, and once again demonstrated his free spirit, free to laugh and joke on the 'sacred soil' of Sanremo."

Gaetano's performance was well received by critics and audiences alike: in the end, the song came third, behind E dirsi ciao by Matia Bazar and Un'emozione da poco by Anna Oxa.

The song went on to dominate the charts for several weeks. It remained in the Top Ten for 14 weeks and sold over 600,000 copies. A version of the song in German was released by Wolfgang Petry.

Meanwhile, Gianna, thanks mainly to the springboard provided by Sanremo, became a hit in the discos of the Riviera and remained in the top ten for fourteen weeks, selling over 600,000 copies. The English version of the song, Gina, was never released, while the German version was sung by Wolfgang Petry. After participating in the Festival, Gaetano's previous career was practically overshadowed by the success of Gianna: for most of the public, the singer-songwriter was known simply as “the singer of Gianna”, while many of his “long-time” fans interpreted the song and his participation in Sanremo as a lapse in style.

A contrary opinion came from Ciao 2001:

It is Rino's coherence that, from the early years of his career to the present day, has sought only to change his position in the public's rankings of preference: his attitude towards the song and the themes it deals with is identical.

In any case, Gaetano was somewhat taken aback by the consequences of his participation in the Festival, so much so that he regretted his decision:

Sanremo means nothing, and it's no coincidence that I participated with Gianna, which means nothing.

=== Nuntereggae più and controversy ===
In the same year Gaetano appeared on Rai Radio 1 radio programme Canzone d'Autore. During the programme, emerging musicians are invited to comment on their own songs. The programme was called "E cantava le canzoni", a title taken from a song from his fourth album.

On the same album is the now notorious "Nuntereggae più", and Gaetano was asked to discuss it because of the numerous political references and the long list of names in the lyrics. He replied:

The songs are not political texts and I do not make speeches. This is just teasing. So, for me, "Nuntereggae più" is the lightest song I've ever done.

Some verses of the song contain lists of names of people who at that time were prominent on the radio, television and newspapers. Some of the names included in the first version were deleted or replaced. For example, in the original version, written before his kidnapping, appeared the name of Aldo Moro. As a result of subsequent events, the name was later deleted from the text of the song, so as to avoid creating controversy. But other names were also deleted including the journalist Indro Montanelli, the actor Lino Banfi, Sinatra, Michele Sindona (Italian banker and convicted criminal) and the president of the Italian defence company Finmeccanica Camillo Crociani who was involved in the Lockheed scandal and the illegal Masonic Propaganda Due (P2) lodge.

Vincenzo Mollica recalled:

'Nuntereggae' was a very entertaining song, but it also had the courage of its convictions, never holding back: it named names, at a time when naming names was very difficult.

In that year, Gaetano participated in a tour and some evening events, the most famous of which is definitely Discomare '78 and specifically the final night held in the Valley of the Temples in Agrigento on 23 August 1978. The singer was supposed to sing Nuntereggae più, but Rai tries to stop him and Rino in protest leaves the event.

During the same period, he was invited by Maurizio Costanzo to appear on his television programme Acquario: the host and the then Member of Parliament Susanna Agnelli, who was a guest on the show, were two of the names mentioned in the song Nuntereggae più, which the singer-songwriter mimed in playback, once again wearing a top hat. Costanzo, who clearly did not appreciate the song, introduced the artist as “the author of ironic, playful and light-hearted songs who, given his passion for making lists, will soon devote himself to setting the Yellow pages to music”; the future senator, on the other hand, emphasised the right of young people like Gaetano to mock and criticise previous generations.

In October, Gaetano went to Madrid to record the Spanish version of the song. The title chosen was "Corta el rollo ya" (Cut it out) and the singer adapted the lyrics by inserting characters of Spanish politics and entertainment as Santiago Carrillo, Pirri, Vicente del Bosque and Susan Estrada. The album was released in the spring and enjoyed moderate success.

=== Final albums ===
Participating in Sanremo marked a definite turning point in the singer-songwriter's career and life:

Gaetano was a supernova. He shone for three years, from 1976 with Mio fratello è figlio unico to 1978 with Nuntereggae più. The success of Gianna at Sanremo took him by surprise; he didn't have time to come to terms with it.

— Andrea Scanzi, Ancora Rino, fratello unico e immortale, La Stampa, 25 March 2009

Encouraged by record producers to produce new songs, Rino Gaetano travelled to the island of Stromboli in search of inspiration, then on 23 February 1979 he flew to Mexico City where he recorded his new album. 1979 sees the release of Gaetano's fifth studio album, Resta vile maschio, dove vai? and his first with RCA. The album contains the first and only song in Gaetano's entire discography not written entirely by him: the lyrics of the title track were written by Mogol, after a meeting between him and the singer-songwriter. Despite the promotion, the LP did not achieve the hoped-for success and did not sell more than 200,000 copies. Gaetano attributed the album's lack of success to his decision to experiment with Latin American sounds, which were very popular at the time, in response to the crisis in singer-songwriter music (similar sounds had been included by another RCA singer-songwriter, Claudio Baglioni, in the album Solo). Critics, on the other hand, blamed his lack of inspiration.

Rino's performances had changed considerably since his early days: the singer had a much larger following and the stage design was now planned down to the smallest detail.

Gaetano took part in his first Festivalbar and then, in October, he attended the Discoestate in Rieti. On this occasion, in protest at having to sing along to playback, when the music starts, instead of pretending to sing, he decides to act indifferent and smokes a cigarette.

During this period, Gaetano purchased a house in Mentana, near Rome, likely in anticipation of a future marriage to his fiancée Amelia.

Also in 1979, during a concert on the beach in Capocotta (in fact also mentioned in the lyrics), before singing Nuntereggae più, Gaetano said:

There's someone who wants to put a gag on me! I do not fear them! They will not succeed! I feel that, in the future, my songs will be sung by future generations, that, thanks to mass communication, they will understand what I mean tonight! They will understand and open their eyes, rather than having them full of salt! And you wonder what happened on the beach Capocotta.

Gaetano was referring to the murder of Wilma Montesi.

In 1980, he recorded his final album E io ci sto noted for its serious tone and rock sound. This album introduced new sounds; what struck listeners most about the record was the more serious tone of the songs, the singer-songwriter's commitment to social issues, and the use of rock sounds. Despite lower than usual sales, Gaetano declared himself satisfied because of the strong and precise message conveyed by the album and because of the different kind of attention it demanded from the public. In February 1981, Ciao 2001 wrote:

In this album, Rino Gaetano returns to dealing with the most obvious side of Italy without ever lamenting it (and this is undoubtedly the most positive aspect) and firing off an infinite number of shots, most of which, however, miss the mark. The musical choices offer nothing new or surprising: catchy melodies that border on banality, and a voice that, however distinctive, manages to be expressive only at times.

That same year, at the invitation of Giovanni Tommaso, Rino participated with Anna Oxa, Lucio Dalla and Ivan Cattaneo in the album Alice by the group Perigeo. Gaetano sang his songs Al bar dello sport (ovvero sogghigni e sesso) with Maria Monti and Confusione gran confusione together with all the other guests. In December, he left for Ecuador, where he had planned several evenings.

In 1981, RCA organised a tour presented by Shel Shapiro: Gaetano performed alongside Riccardo Cocciante and New Perigeo. The decision to pair artists so different from each other did not fully convince Gaetano, nor did it convince the critics. The opening night was at the Teatro Tenda in Rome, and Gaetano appeared unusually sombre and serious during the performance: his father had been in intensive care for several days. Two concerts from the tour, held on 4 and 5 March 1981 at the Auditorium in Pistoia and the Palasport in Novara, respectively, were used to create a live mini-album entitled Q Concert (1981). The album included four tracks, including Ancora insieme, co-written by Gaetano, and his version of Cocciante's A mano a mano. The latter, in turn, reinterpreted Aida.

In 1981, he also played the role of the Fox from Pinocchio in a movie directed by Carmelo Bene and filmed in Rome.

=== Death ===
On 8 January 1981 Gaetano was involved in a head-on collision when an off-road vehicle drove the wrong way along the road and pinned Gaetano's Volvo 343 against the guardrail; the singer was unharmed while his car was completely destroyed. Gaetano then bought a new Volvo 343, in metallic gray.

On 31 May 1981, the singer-songwriter made his last television appearance, singing E io ci sto and Scusa Mary on the programme Crazy Bus aired on Rai Due. During those same days, he also recorded several songs with Anna Oxa, including a cover of Il leone e la gallina by Mogol and Lucio Battisti.

On 2 June, at about 3 a.m., Gaetano was returning home alone in his Volvo 343. At 3:55 a.m., while along Rome's Via Nomentana, at the intersection of Viale XXI Aprile, he was in a head-on collision with a truck. The front and right side of the Volvo were destroyed. Gaetano's head struck the windscreen violently, smashing it, while his chest hit the steering wheel and dashboard with tremendous force. The autopsy revealed that the cause of the loss of control was a possible collapse before the impact. The lorry driver, Antonio Torres, who provided first aid to the singer, said that he saw him slump to one side and start to swerve, then open his eyes again just moments before the impact.

When help arrived, Rino was already in a coma and at the hospital, an x-ray showed a fracture at the base of the skull, various wounds to the forehead, a fractured right molar and a suspected fracture of the sternum. However, the clinic did not have a department for cranial injuries and the doctor on duty, Dr. Novelli, tried in vain to contact another hospital with a cranial trauma department. He contacted by phone St. John, St. Camillus, the CTO of Garbatella, the Policlinico Gemelli and San Filippo Neri, but could not get any assistance. Finally admitted to Gemelli Hospital, at 6 a.m., Rino Gaetano died. There was a great deal of controversy about this accident, because of the failure of any of the contacted hospitals to help Gaetano and thus, an investigation was opened, and a parliamentary question was submitted.

On 4 June his funeral was held in the Church of the Sacred Heart of Jesus, in which Gaetano had planned to get married. His funeral was attended by many relatives, friends, members of the music industry, RCA executives and fans. Initially he was buried in the small cemetery of Mentana, but on 17 October his body was transferred to the Verano cemetery, where it remains.

In recent years, the lyrics of the unpublished song La ballata di Renzo ("The Ballad of Renzo") has drawn a lot of attention – a song written by Rino more than ten years before his death. This song tells the story of a boy named Renzo, who died under similar circumstances. Renzo is hit by a car and dies after being rejected by many hospitals in Rome for lack of space, while his friends are at the bar. The song even references three of the hospitals that refused to treat Gaetano on 2 June 1981 due to lack of beds: General Hospital, San Giovanni and San Camillo. This is a topic of popular discussion. Gaetano's death was discussed on 27 November 2007 in a short radio program broadcast on Radio DeeJay by Carlo Lucarelli, who uses a writer-documentary narrative form to reconstruct unsolved crimes related to the world of music. But the death of Rino Gaetano, too similar, in terms of modality, to the words of his unpublished song, almost seems like a signature left by some powerful secret organization that was ridiculed precisely in the lyrics of all his musical pieces.

In one of his books, the criminal lawyer Bruno Mautone hypothesizes that the death of Rino Gaetano was not a random event at all, but that, on the contrary, it was a murder organized by the deviant Italian secret services, probably commissioned by US counterparts, as the songs of the Calabrian singer-songwriter listed names, and facts that should have remained secret. For example, in the song E Berta filava ("And Bertha spun") Rino Gaetano spoke about Lockheed bribery scandals two years before its discovery, just as the apparently innocuous text of the song Gianna ("Johanna", is the female name of the then president of the Italian republic, Giovanni Leone, who resigned only three months after the presentation of the song) would not refer to the representation of the imaginary of the person with his own ideals and illusory ideologies, who, in order not to give up all the comforts that life allows, instead renounces his ideas, to his convictions, but would metaphorically denounce Italian politics made up of compromises, subterfuges, betrayals, lies, theft. But even more explicit are the names contained in the list present in the song Nuntereggaeppiù, all belonging to the regular secret Masonic lodge Propaganda Due, implicated in many scandals and unclear events in Italian politics (attempted coups in 1964 "Piano Solo" and 1970 "Golpe Borghese", secret financings from the CIA to Italian political parties, Strategy of tension, killing of inconvenient witnesses such as the bandit Salvatore Giuliano, the investigative journalist Mauro De Mauro, the poet and film director Pier Paolo Pasolini, Wilma Montesi, the singer Luigi Tenco, or the manager Enrico Mattei, inconvenient witnesses who will be killed years after the song's publication such as Carmine Pecorelli, Roberto Calvi, Michele Sindona, and so on). The title of the song is already a program because it plays on a double meaning of the Italian language. In fact italian verb "reggere" means "to endure", "to stand", and in the first person of the indicative mood and of the present tense sounds similar to the word "Reggae", so the title "Nuntereggaeppiù", a non-existent word in Italian, sounds like a classic exclamation "I can't bear you more". According to the author, the source of Gaetano's revelations would have been a very dear friend of his, Enrico Carnevali, an agent of the Italian secret services belonging to the Operation Gladio organization, who died a few months later in a road accident "which occurred at equal to Rino, on the Nomentana". Indeed, in one of his last songs "E io ci sto" ("And I agree"), Rino Gaetano explicitly speaks of the pressure they give him and heralds his own death and future re-evaluation of his songs

According to the author, the source of Gaetano's revelations was his dear friend Enrico Carnevali, who died a few months later in a car accident ‘which occurred, like Rino's, on the Nomentana road’. According to Giorgio Mirandolina, it should be emphasised that Mautone's theory remains a hypothesis, for which there is no definitive evidence to support it.

The first book on his life, also the first official biography, was published in 2001, 20 years after his death. In 2020, the Italian postal service dedicated a stamp to him for the seventieth anniversary of his birth.

== Discography ==
=== Studio albums ===
- Ingresso libero (1974)
- Mio fratello è figlio unico (album) (1976)
- Aida (1977)
- Nuntereggae più (1978)
- Resta vile maschio, dove vai? (1979)
- E io ci sto (1980)

=== Live albums ===
- Q Concert (1981, with Riccardo Cocciante and New Perigeo)

=== Compilations ===
- Gianna e le altre... (1990; includes the previously unreleased "Solo con io" and "Le beatitudini")
- Aida '93 (1993)
- Superbest (1996)
- La storia (1998)
- Sotto i cieli di Rino (2003, 2005)
- Figlio unico (2007)
- The Essential Rino Gaetano (2008)
- Live & Rarities (2009, with some unpublished tracks)
- Nuntereggae più (2010)

=== Singles ===
- I Love You Maryanna/Jaqueline (1973)
- Tu, forse non essenzialmente tu/E la vecchia salta con l'asta (1974)
- Ma il cielo è sempre più blu (1975)
- Mio fratello è figlio unico/Sfiorivano le viole (1976)
- Berta filava/Mio fratello è figlio unico (1976)
- Aida/Escluso il cane (1977)
- Aida/Spendi spandi effendi (1977)
- Gianna (1978)
- Nuntereggae più (1978)
- Resta vile maschio, dove vai?/Ahi Maria (1979)
- E io ci sto/Metà Africa metà Europa (1980)
- Solo con io (1980)
- Le beatitudini (1981)

== In popular culture ==
- Rino Gaetano - Ma il cielo è sempre più blu – Raifiction, 2007
- My Brother Is an Only Child (Italian: Mio fratello è figlio unico) – Italian film directed by Daniele Luchetti. The title of the film is taken from the famous Gaetano hit song of the same name.
