= Stai fermo lì =

Single by Giusy Ferreri

from the album Gaetana
- Released: 16 January 2009
- Recorded: 2008
- Genre: Pop rock
- Length: 4:09
- Label: Sony BMG
- Songwriter: Tiziano Ferro
- Producer: Tiziano Ferro

Giusy Ferreri singles chronology
"Novembre" (2008)	"Stai fermo lì" (2009)	"La scala (The Ladder)" (2009)

"Stai fermo lì" is a song by Italian pop singer Giusy Ferreri, released as third single from her debut album Gaetana. The song was written and produced by Italian Pop-R&B singer Tiziano Ferro. It was released digitally in Italy and Switzerland on 16 January 2008.

== Music video ==
The music video for "Stai fermo lì" was filmed on 14 and 15 January 2009 in Verona by Gaetano Morbioli, and was premiered on TG1 on 22 February 2009.

== Formats and track listings ==
=== Digital single ===
1. “Stai fermo lì" 4:09

== Charts ==
Chart (2009)	Peak position
Italian Singles Chart	15

=== Year-end charts ===
Chart (2009)	Position
Italian Singles Chart	76
