= Non ti scordar mai di me (EP) =

EP by Giusy Ferreri
- Released: 27 June 2008
- Recorded: May–June 2008
- Genre: Pop
- Length: 18:35
- Label: Sony BMG
- Producer: Fabrizio Giannini

Giusy Ferreri chronology
Non ti scordar mai di me (2008)	Gaetana (2008)

Singles from Non ti scordar mai di me
- 1. "Non ti scordardar mai di me" Released: May 30, 2008

Non ti scordar mai di me (Italian: Never Forget Me) is the debut EP by Italian pop singer Giusy Ferreri, released in Italy on 27 June 2008 by Sony BMG, following Ferreri's participation on the television talent show X Factor.

It was primarily produced by Fabrizio Giannini, with additional contribution from Tiziano Ferro and Michele Canova.

== Recording ==
In June 2008 Ferreri, after her participation on the first edition of X Factor, entered the recording studios to start working on modern versions of classic songs from the '60s and '70s with Lucio Fabbri and his production team. While Fabbri contributed most to the album, the singer also worked with producers Fabrizio Giannini and Michele Canova, songwriter Roberto Casalino, and fellow Italian pop singer Tiziano Ferro.

== Reception ==
Critical reception of Non ti scordar mai di me was generally positive. Many noted that although the album was heavily influenced by an old-school sound, mainly from the '60s, it was able to catch a young aged audience. The EP became one of the best-selling albums of 2008 in Italy: it sold over 50,000 copies in its first week of release and debuted at the top spot of the Italian Albums Chart. As of September 2008, Non ti scordar mai di me has been certified four times platinum by the FIMI for shipments of over 300,000 copies.

Non ti scordar mai di me, being an EP, spawned one single, the title track "Non ti scordar mai di me", which reached number one in Italy for thirteen non-consecutive weeks, making it one of the most successful debuts of the year. It also reached the top thirty in Switzerland and is planned to be released in the rest of Europe during the first quarter of 2009.

== Track listing ==
1. "Non ti scordar mai di me" (Roberto Casalino, Tiziano Ferro) – 3:27
2. "Remedios" (Gabriella Ferri) – 2:32
3. "Che cosa c'è" (Gino Paoli) – 2:29
4. "La bambola" (Franco Migliacci, Bruno Zambrini, Ruggero Cini) – 3:11
5. "Ma che freddo fa" (Migliacci, Claudio Mattone) – 3:40
6. "Insieme a te non ci sto più" (Paolo Conte, Vito Pallavicini, Michele Virano) – 3:06

== Charts ==
Chart (2008)	Peak position	Certification	Sales
Italian FIMI Albums Chart	1	4× platinum	320,000
