= Non ti scordar mai di me (song) =

Single by Giusy Ferreri

from the album Gaetana and Non ti scordar mai di me EP
- Released: 30 May 2008
- Recorded: 2008, Milan
- Genre: Blues; pop
- Length: 3:31
- Label: Sony BMG
- Songwriters: Roberto Casalino, Tiziano Ferro
- Producer: Fabrizio Giannini

Giusy Ferreri singles chronology
"Il party" (2005)	"Non ti scordar mai di me" (2008)	"Novembre" (2008)

"Non ti scordar mai di me" ("Never Forget About Me") is a pop song performed by Italian pop singer Giusy Ferreri. It was written by Roberto Casalino and Tiziano Ferro and co-produced by Fabrizio Giannini.

The song was released as the singer's second single on 30 May 2008 in Italy, and peaked at number one in Italy, where it became one of the best-selling and most-downloaded singles of all the time and also reached the #1 in Greece, the top 30 on the sales charts in Switzerland and the top 20 position on a composite European Singles Chart.

== Background ==
"Non ti scordar mai di me" was originally written by Roberto Casalino several years ago, then Italian popstar Tiziano Ferro has collaborated on the melody when the song has been offered to Giusy Ferreri. The song world-premiered on 27 May 2008 on the last episode of the first Italian edition of X Factor.

A similarity of the song with "Back to Black", by English singer-songwriter Amy Winehouse, and "Coming Home" by the American band Alter Bridge has been noted.

== Release ==
It has been made available on CD single and digital download, from 30 May 2008. From 27 June 2008 it has been included in the debut EP, Non ti scordar mai di me, together with five covers performed by the singer. The single has been included in the first official album Gaetana, too.

== Music video ==
The music video for "Non ti scordar mai di me" was directed by Cosimo Alemà and entered the planning of the thematic channels from June 30, 2008. It shows the singer to interpret the passage sat on the angle of a bed. To these sequences are alternated other, in which the principal history of the video is told.

In these sequences Ferreri has shown in the meticulous preparations of a romantic dinner. On the screen sometimes is shown the schedule in which the action develops. At 19.35 Ferreri chooses the suit to wear, at 20.18 it's everything ready but at 21.02 the guest is not introduced yet. The video continues showing Ferreri who becomes impatient, she waits up to midnight, then she eats greedily alone the prepared dinner, as long as 02.16 when the telephone rings. Nevertheless, he is not the man, but a friend of her.

== Chart performance ==
The single debuted on the Italian Singles FIMI at #2 on 5 June 2008, contemporarily, "Remedios", another cover song by Ferreri, peaked at #7 only on digital downloads. The following week "Non ti scordar mai di me" peaked at #1, but next week it was knocked off by the song "Cry" by Italian band Novecento. However, it returned at #1 after a couple of weeks and it held the pole position for an astonishing total of 15 non-consecutive weeks, becoming one of the longest running number-one hit singles as well as one of the best-selling singles ever in FIMI charts' history. The song debuted at #39 on the Italian Downloads Chart, and the following week raised-up at #2. Then it stayed atop for 15 consecutive weeks.

The single has been a huge broadcast success, reaching the top spot of the Nielsen Music Control chart, which controls the Italian broadcast circuit.

== Formats and track listings ==
=== CD single ===
1. "Non ti scordar mai di me" 3.31
2. "Nunca te olvides de mì" (Spain only) 3.31

== Charts ==
Chart (2008)	Peak position
Belgium Ultratip Chart	14
European Singles Chart	14
Greece Singles Chart	1
Italian Singles Chart	1
Italian Airplay Chart	1
Swiss Singles Chart	26
