= Novembre (song) =

Single by Giusy Ferreri

from the album Gaetana
- Released: 17 October 2008
- Recorded: 2008
- Genre: Pop
- Length: 3:09
- Label: Sony BMG
- Songwriter: Roberto Casalino
- Producer: Tiziano Ferro

Giusy Ferreri singles chronology
"Non ti scordar mai di me" (2008)	"Novembre" (2008)	"Stai fermo lì" (2009)

"Novembre" is a song by Italian pop singer Giusy Ferreri, released as the second single from her debut album Gaetana. It was written by Roberto Casalino and produced by Tiziano Ferro.

The song was released digitally on 17 October 2008 in Italy, Austria, Netherlands, Belgium, Germany and other European countries. It debuted at the number one spot on the Italian charts.

== Music video ==
The music video for "Novembre" was directed by Cosimo Alemà, who was also the director of "Non ti scordar mai di me", and was filmed on 9–10 October 2008 in Paris. The video premiered on 27 October 2008 on Fox Life Italy and the song has been used for the official Italian advertising of the fifth season of the American television series Desperate Housewives.

In the video Giusy Ferreri is chased by a man in Paris, but later she discovers that he was her neighbour.

== Formats and track listings ==
=== Digital single ===
1. “Novembre" 3.09

== Charts ==
Chart (2008)	Peak position
Greece Singles Chart	7
Italian Singles Chart	1
Swiss Singles Chart	65
