= Giusy Ferreri =

Italian singer and songwriter

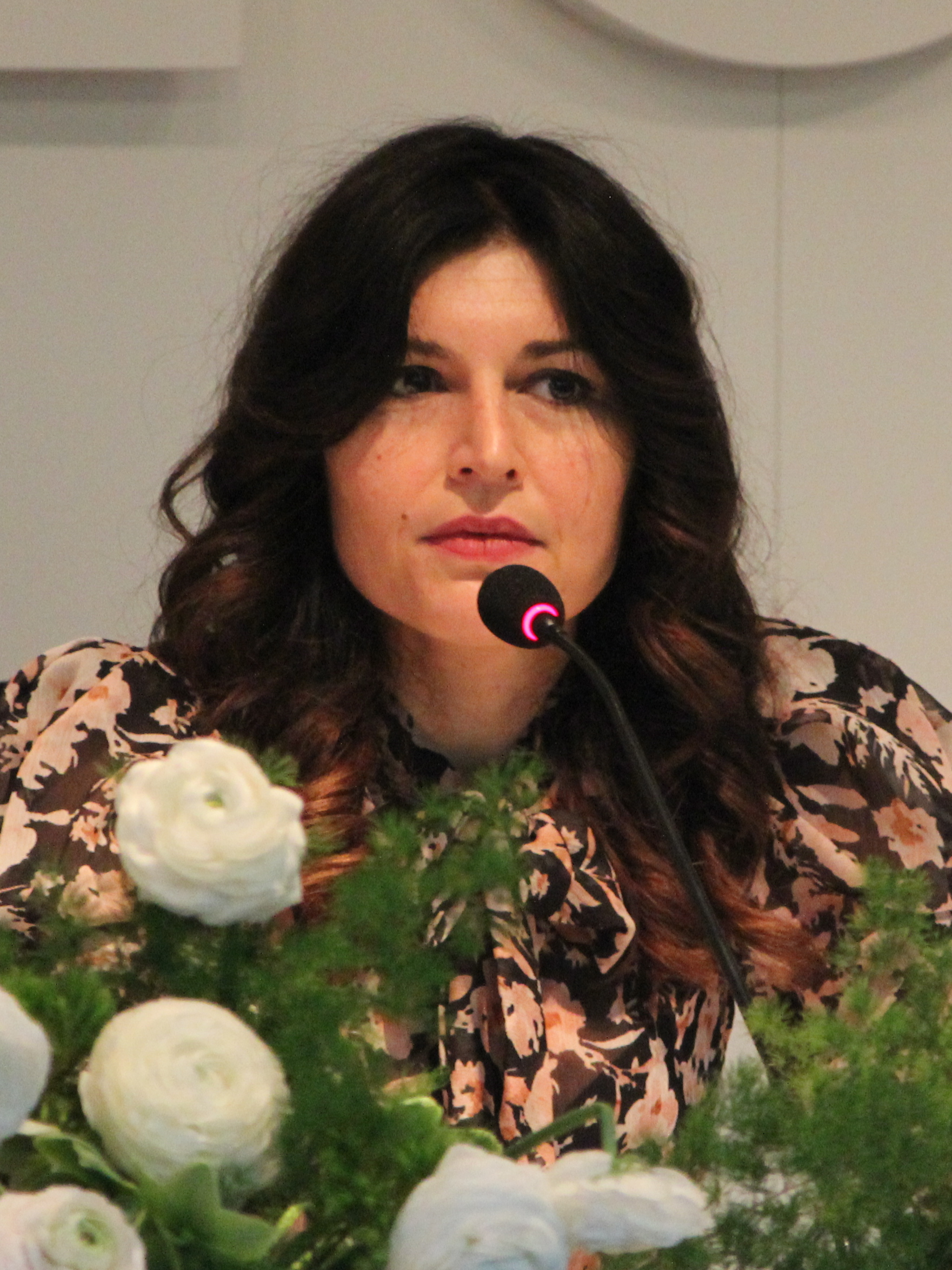

Background information
- Also known as: Gaetana
- Born: Giuseppa Gaetana Ferreri; 17 April 1979 (age 47); Palermo, Sicily, Italy
- Genres: Pop; blues
- Occupations: Singer; songwriter
- Years active: 1998–present
- Label: Sony Music Italy
- Website: www.giusyferreriofficial.it

Giuseppa Gaetana "Giusy" Ferreri (Italian pronunciation: [ˈdʒuːzi ferˈrɛːri]; born 17 April 1979) is an Italian singer and songwriter. In 2008, she took part in the first Italian edition of the talent show X Factor, coming in second place.

She topped the Italian Singles Chart 5 times, with the singles "Non ti scordar mai di me", "Novembre", diamond certified collaboration "Roma-Bangkok" with Baby K, "Amore e capoeira" and "Jambo", both with Takagi & Ketra. She spent a total of 48 weeks at number one in the country, beating the previous record owned by Madonna (38 weeks).

Ferreri has sold over 2.8 million copies worldwide to-date.

She has collaborated with many notable Italian singers, including Ornella Vanoni, Claudio Baglioni, Ron, Tiziano Ferro, J-Ax, Ermal Meta and Giuliano Sangiorgi.

== Career ==
In June 2008, Sony BMG Italy released the debut EP by Ferreri, which includes her first single "Non ti scordar mai di me" written by Italian pop singer Tiziano Ferro, and five covers of classic songs from the 1960s and 1970s. The single held the number one position of the Italian singles chart for fifteen consecutive weeks, becoming one of the most successful tracks ever on that chart. The album debuted at the top spot of the Italian album chart and stayed there for eleven consecutive weeks. It went on to be certified 4× platinum, denoting over 314,000 copies shipped.

=== Debut album: Gaetana ===
In October 2008, the song "Novembre", the first single from Ferreri's official debut album Gaetana, was released. The tune debuted at number one in Italy and held the top spot for eight weeks so far. The album was released on 14 November 2008. It debuted at number one on the iTunes Italy chart and subsequently peaked at No. 2 on the Italian FIMI albums chart, behind Laura Pausini's album Primavera anticipata, selling over 80,000 copies in its first week of release. The album sold over 706,000 copies in Italy and Greece and was certified diamond by FIMI for selling more than 350,000 copies in the country. The second single from the album, "Stai fermo lì", was announced on 8 January 2009 and was released in Italy on 16 January 2009. The third single off the album was "La Scala (The Ladder)", originally written by Linda Perry and translated into Italian by singer Tiziano Ferro. The song peaked at No. 27 on the FIMI singles chart and at No. 49 on the Greece Singles Chart.

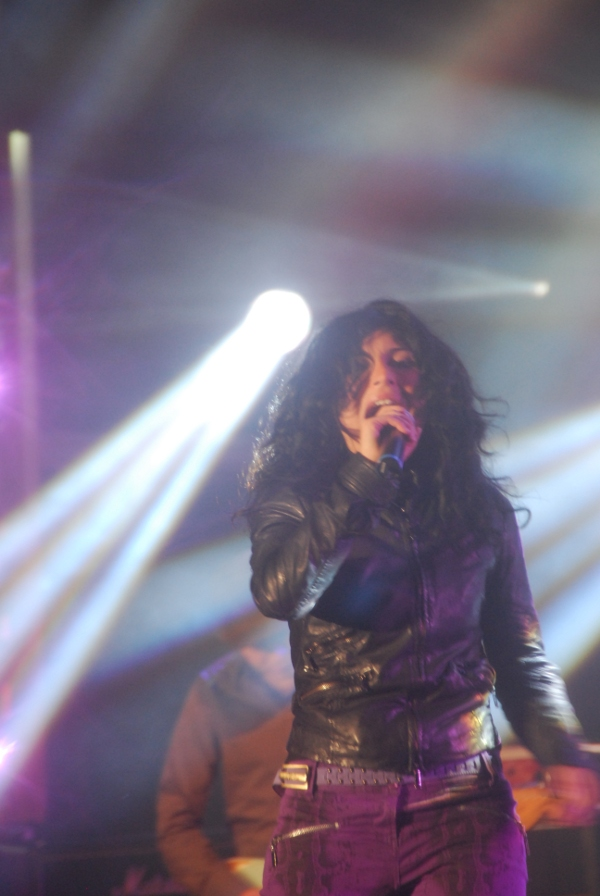
Ferreri in concert

=== Cover album: Fotografie ===
On 20 November 2009, her second studio album was released across Europe, debuting at No. 10 on the Italian FIMI albums chart. The first single is a cover of "Ma il cielo è sempre più blu" by Rino Gaetano.

In her second studio album, Ferreri records cover versions of some of her favourite (Italian and international) artists: "La magia è la mia amante (I Was Made to Love Magic)" by Nick Drake, "Con una rosa" by Vinicio Capossela and Paolo Benvegnù, "Il mare verticale (Portrait the Sea)" by Jerome Kern, "Yesterdays" (song played in the past by Billie Holiday), "Ciao amore ciao" by Luigi Tenco and "Estate" by Bruno Martino. In 2010, the rapper Marracash and Ferreri released the single "Rivincita". The song was the single from the Marracash album Fino a qui tutto bene.

=== Third album: Il mio universo ===
On 16 February 2011 her third studio album was released across Europe, debuting at No. 13 and peaked at number one on the Italian FIMI albums chart and No. 98 on the Swiss Album chart. The first single is "Il mare immenso" released on the very same day, written by Bungaro. The first single taken from her third studio album debuted at No. 8 and peaked at No. 6 on the FIMI Top 10 Singles Chart. "Il mare immenso" stayed for three months in the top fifty of the FIMI Singles Charts and peaked at number 5 on the Italian Radio Airplay Chart. Eventually, the song was awarded as the Best Sanremo Song at the "Premio Lunezia". The second and third singles, "Piccoli Dettagli" and "Noi brave ragazze", were written respectively by Rudy Marra and Bungaro. "Piccoli Dettagli" was chosen as the "Song of the summer" after a survey made by Sky

=== Fourth album: L'attesa, "Roma-Bangkok" and Hits ===
After participating in Sanremo with the single "Ti porto a cena con me", Giusy released the album L'attesa which debuted and peaked at No. 4 of the Italian Charts. Her second single, "La bevanda ha un retrogusto amaro", failed to enter the charts. In 2015, she came back with Baby K for the single "Roma-Bangkok". The song was extremely successful in many European countries. It remained on top of the Italian chart for eleven consecutive weeks and later was certified diamond in Italy for selling more than 500,000 copies in the country. "Roma Bangkok" was the best-selling hit of 2015 and so far it is the most watched Italian-language music video on YouTube with more than 250,000,000 views. In November of the same year, Giusy released her first greatest hits, Hits, which was certified gold for selling more than 25,000 copies. The lead single "Volevo te" reached No. 2 of the Italian Airplay charts and was certified platinum by FIMI.

=== Fifth album: Girotondo ===
In 2017, Giusy came back to Sanremo Music Festival with the song "Fa talmente male" and released the album Girotondo which debuted and peaked at No. 11. The second single "Partiti adesso" reached number one on the Italian Airplay Charts and was certified platinum by FIMI. The third single "L'amore mi perseguita" featuring Tiromancino peaked at No. 6 of the Italian Airplay charts. Giusy took part in the seventeenth edition of the talent show Amici di Maria De Filippi. She was one of the teacher/judges together with Rudy Zerbi, Paola Turci, Alessandra Celentano and Veronica Peparini.

In the summer of 2018, Takagi & Ketra chose Ferreri to be the female voice of the song "Amore e capoeira", which spent 12 weeks at number one of the Italian Charts and reached No. 2 in Switzerland. The single was certified 5 times Platinum for selling more than 250,000 copies. The song won the Wind Summer Festival and was awarded the Song of the Summer 2018. The Girotondo Live Tour started in the beginning of May in Tuscany.

In January 2019, Giusy released "Le cose che canto": the song was written by Dario Faini and Tommaso Paradiso. In May 2019, the collaboration with Tagaki and Ketra continued and together with Omi. They released the single "Jambo" that reached number one after three weeks. The song stayed at number one for two weeks and was certified double platinum for selling more than 150,000 copies. In November 2019, she released the song "Momenti perfetti", written by Roberto Casalino and Niccolò Verrienti.

On 24 June 2020, a collaboration with the singer Elettra Lamborghini was announced, and on 29 June, the song "La Isla" was released. The song peaked at No. 22 of the Italian Single Charts and was the 93rd best-selling single of the year in Italy. "La Isla" was produced by Takagi & Ketra. In November 2020, the song was certified Platinum by the Italian Federation of Music. In May 2021, Takagi & Ketra renovated for the third time the collaboration with Ms Ferreri with the single "Shimmy Shimmy", a dance pop song with an Arabic Touch. The song went viral on TikTok thanks to the video choreography. "Shimmy Shimmy" debuted at No. 82 of the Italian Single Charts and eventually peaked at No. 22 reaching the Platinum Certification for more than 70,000 copies sold in the country. The song managed to reach the No. 4 of the Italian Airplay radio.

In December 2021, her participation in the Sanremo Music Festival was officially announced with the song "Miele". The song placed twenty-third, and the single reached the same position on the FIMI chart. In April of the same year, she released Cortometraggi, which debuted at number twenty-five on the album sales chart, and she resumed touring. The singles "Causa effetto" and "Federico Fellini" were also released. In November 2023, she wrote and performed the soundtrack for the film "Il meglio di te." In 2024, she decided to form an alternative rock band called Bloom, with which she produced the album "Hangover" and released four singles. Despite strong initial hype, however, the band struggled to gain momentum.In 2025, Ferreri served as a coach on the television program Io Canto Family. On 2 January 2026, "Musica Classica" was released to radio airplay.On 27 February, she took part in the 76th Sanremo Music Festival as a guest during the fourth evening dedicated to cover performances, where she performed "Space Oddity" (titled "Ragazzo solo, ragazza sola" in Italian) by David Bowie together with competing singer Francesco Renga. The performance was released as a single the following day.

== Discography ==
- 2008 – Non ti scordar mai di me
- 2008 – Gaetana
- 2009 – Fotografie
- 2011 – Il mio universo
- 2014 – L'attesa
- 2015 – Hits
- 2017 – Girotondo
- 2022 – Cortometraggi

== TV programmes ==
- X Factor, second edition (Rai 2, 2008) contestant -second place
- Amici di Maria De Filippi, seventeenth edition (Canale 5, 2017–2018) teacher-judge

== Awards and nominations ==
Year	Award	Category	Result
2008	Venice Music Awards	Best New Artist	Won
2008	M.E.I.	Best Newcomer	Won
2008	Premio Videoclip Italy	Best Videoclip ("Non ti scordar mai di me")	Won
2009	Wind Music Awards	Multi Platinum Disc Award (Gaetana)	Won
2009	Wind Music Awards	Multi Platinum Single Award ("Non ti scordar mai di me")	Won
2009	Tributo ad Augusto Honoree	Best Italian Revelation of 2008	Won
2009	MTV European Music Awards	Best Italian Act	Nominated
2010	Wind Music Awards	Gold Disc Award (Fotografie)	Won
2010	EBBA Awards	Herself	Won
2010	Venice Music Awards	Multi Platinum Award (Gaetana)	Won
2011	MTV Italian Music Awards	Best Talent Show Artist	Nominated
2011	Lunezia Award	Musical-Literary Value ("Il mare immenso")	Won
2012	Sanremo Hit Award	Best Airplay Song ("Il mare immenso")	Won
2014	Summer Festival	Song of the Summer (" Inciso sulla pelle")	Nominated
2014	Limone D'Oro Award	Honoree Award ("Non ti scordar mai di me")	Won
2015	Summer Festival	Song of the Summer ("Roma-Bankok")	Nominated
2015	Vevo Awards	Vevo Queen Award ("Roma-Bankok")	Won
2015	Vevo Awards	Italians Do it Better ("Roma-Bankok")	Nominated
2016	Summer Festival	Song of the Summer ("Volevo te")	Nominated
2016	Vevo Awards	Vevo Certified Award ("Roma-Bankok")	Won
2016	Wind Music Awards	Platinum Single Award ("Volevo te")	Won
2016	Wind Music Awards	Multi Platinum Single Award ("Roma-Bankok")	Won
2017	Summer Festival	Song of the Summer ("Partiti adesso")	Nominated
2018	RTL 102.5 Awards	FIMI Award ("Amore e capoeira")	Won
2018	RTL 102.5 Awards	SIAE Award ("Amore e capoeira")	Won
2018	RTL 102.5 Awards	Summer Powe Hit ("Amore e capoeira")	Nominated
2019	RTL 102.5 Awards	Summer Power Hit ("Jambo")	Nominated
2019	RTL 102.5 Awards	SIAE Award ("Jambo")	Won
2019	Vevo Awards	Vevo Certified Award ("Amore e capoeira")	Won
2019	Wind Music Awards	Multi Platinum Single Award ("Amore e capoeira")	Won
