= Elodie discography =

Discography of Italian singer-songwriter and actress Elodie

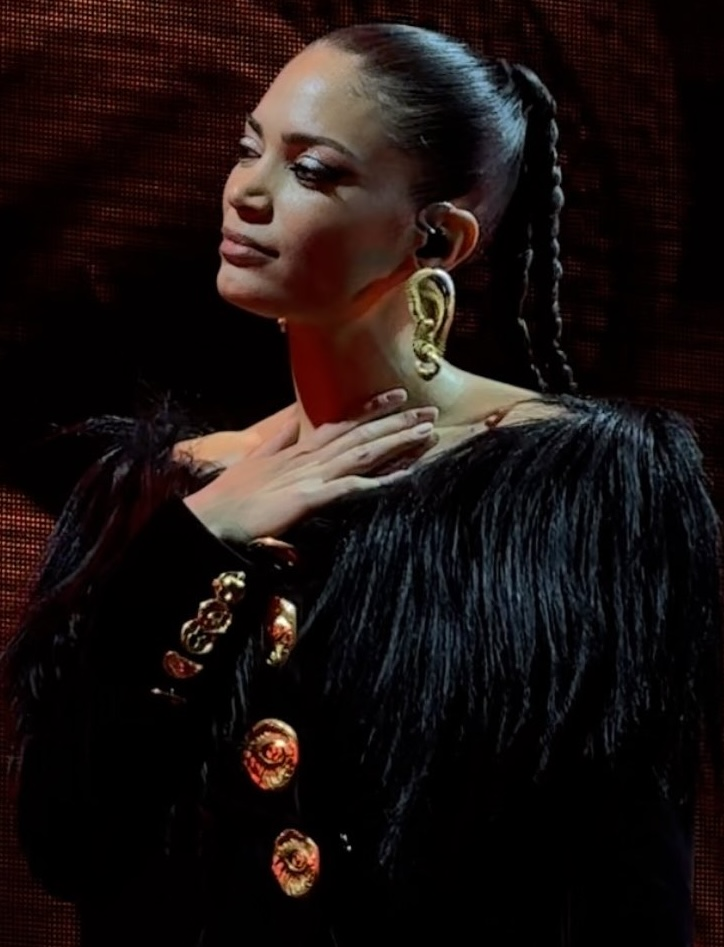
- Elodie in 2023
- Studio albums: 5
- EPs: 1
- Mixtapes: 1
- Live albums: 1
- Singles: 39
- Music videos: 43

The discography of Italian singer-songwriter and actress Elodie consists of five studio albums, one live album, one mixtape, one EP and thirty-nine singles and forty-three music videos.

== Albums ==
=== Studio albums ===
Title	Album details	Peak chart positions		Certifications
Title	Album details	ITA	SWI	Certifications
Un'altra vita	Released: 20 May 2016; Label: Universal Music Italy; Formats: CD, LP, digital download, streaming	2	86	FIMI: Gold
Tutta colpa mia	Released: 17 February 2017; Label: Universal Music Italy; Formats: CD, LP, digital download	6	—	
This Is Elodie	Released: 31 January 2020; Label: Island; Formats: CD, digital download, streaming	6	—	FIMI: 3× Platinum
OK. Respira	Released: 10 February 2023; Label: Double Trouble Club, Island; Formats: CD, LP, digital download, streaming	4	—	FIMI: 2× Platinum
Mi ami mi odi	Released: 2 May 2025; Label: Island; Formats: CD, LP, digital download, streaming	3	—	FIMI: Platinum
"—" denotes album that did not chart or were not released.

=== Live albums ===
Title	Album details
The Stadium Show (Live @ San Siro 2025)	Released: 19 December 2025; Label: Island; Formats: 2 CD, digital download, streaming

== Mixtapes ==
Title	Mixtape details
Red Light	Released: 6 October 2023; Label: Island; Formats: CD, LP, digital download, streaming

== Extended plays ==
Title	EP details
This Is Elodie X Christmas EP	Released: 10 December 2020; Label: Island; Formats: CD, 12", digital download, streaming

== Singles ==
=== As lead artist ===
Title	Year	Peak chart positions		Certifications	Album
Title	Year	ITA	SWI	Certifications	Album
"Un'altra vita"	2016	33	—	FIMI: Gold	Un'altra vita
"Amore avrai"	2016	—	—		Un'altra vita
"L'imperfezione della vita"	2016	—	—		Un'altra vita
"Tutta colpa mia"	2017	12	—	FIMI: Platinum	Tutta colpa mia
"Verrà da se"	2017	—	—		Tutta colpa mia
"Semplice"	2017	—	—		Tutta colpa mia
"Nero Bali" (with Michele Bravi and Guè)	2018	10	—	FIMI: 2× Platinum	This Is Elodie
"Rambla" (featuring Ghemon)	2018	—	—		This Is Elodie
"Pensare male" (with The Kolors)	2019	24	—	FIMI: Platinum	This Is Elodie
"Margarita" (with Marracash)	2019	6	—	FIMI: 3× Platinum	This Is Elodie
"Non è la fine" (featuring Gemitaiz)	2020	63	—		This Is Elodie
"Mal di testa" (featuring Fabri Fibra)	2020	76	—		This Is Elodie
"Andromeda"	2020	6	—	FIMI: Platinum	This Is Elodie
"Guaranà"	2020	13	—	FIMI: 2× Platinum	This Is Elodie
"Ciclone" (with Takagi & Ketra and Mariah Angeliq featuring Gipsy Kings, Nicolás Reyes and Tonino Baliardo)	2020	9	—	FIMI: 2× Platinum	Non-album single
"Vertigine"	2021	40	—	FIMI: Platinum	OK. Respira
"Bagno a mezzanotte"	2022	4	—	FIMI: 4× Platinum	OK. Respira
"Tribale"	2022	13	—	FIMI: 2× Platinum	OK. Respira
"Proiettili (ti mangio il cuore)" (with Joan Thiele)	2022	—	—		OK. Respira
"OK. Respira"	2022	45	—	FIMI: Gold	OK. Respira
"Due"	2023	7	67	FIMI: 3× Platinum	OK. Respira
"Pazza musica" (with Marco Mengoni)	2023	10	—	FIMI: 3× Platinum	Materia (Prisma) / OK. Respira (digital edition only)
"A fari spenti"	2023	21	—	FIMI: Platinum	Red Light
"Black Nirvana"	2024	7	—	FIMI: Platinum	Mi ami mi odi
"Ti voglio" (with Ornella Vanoni and Ditonellapiaga)	2024	—	—		Diverse
"Feeling" (with Tiziano Ferro)	2024	9	—	FIMI: Gold	Mi ami mi odi
"Dimenticarsi alle 7"	2025	7	59	FIMI: Platinum	Mi ami mi odi
"Mi ami mi odi"	2025	18	—	FIMI: Gold	Mi ami mi odi
"Yakuza" (with Sfera Ebbasta and Rvssian)	2025	4	—	FIMI: Platinum	Mi ami mi odi (digital edition only)
"—" denotes a single that did not chart or was not released.

=== As featured artist ===
Title	Year	Peak chart positions	Certifications	Album
Title	Year	ITA	Certifications	Album
"Quando stiamo bene" (Zibba featuring Elodie)	2018	—		Le cose
"Le ragazze di Porta Venezia – The Manifesto" (Myss Keta featuring Elodie, La Pina, Joan Thiele, Priestess and Roshelle)	2019	—		Paprika
"Parli parli" (Carl Brave featuring Elodie)	2020	34	FIMI: Platinum	Coraggio
"La coda del diavolo" (Rkomi featuring Elodie)	2021	1	FIMI: 6× Platinum	Taxi Driver
"Anche stasera" (Sfera Ebbasta featuring Elodie)	2023	3	FIMI: 3× Platinum	X2VR
"Soli a Milano" (Club Dogo featuring Elodie)	2024	7	FIMI: Gold	Club Dogo
"Nu dispietto" (Gigi D'Alessio featuring Elodie)	2024	—		Fra
"Ti vorrei 2024" (Gigi D'Alessio featuring Elodie and Ernia)	2024	78		Fra
"Ex" (Irama featuring Elodie)	2025	11	FIMI: Gold	Antologia della vita e della morte
"—" denotes a single that did not chart or was not released.

== Other certified songs ==
Title	Year	Certifications	Album
"Niente canzoni d'amore"	2020	FIMI: Platinum	This Is Elodie

== Guest appearances ==
Title	Year	Other artist(s)	Album
"Stiamo come stiamo" (Live)	2016	Loredana Bertè	Amiche in Arena
"Io di te non ho paura" (Live)	2016	Emma	Amiche in Arena
"Amici non ne ho" (Live)	2016	Loredana Bertè, Fiorella Mannoia, Noemi, Emma, Elisa, Irene Grandi, Alessandra Amoroso, Patty Pravo, Nina Zilli, Gianna Nannini, Bianca Atzei, Aida Cooper, Paola Turci	Amiche in Arena
"Quello che le donne non dicono" (Live)	2016	Loredana Bertè, Fiorella Mannoia, Noemi, Emma, Elisa, Irene Grandi, Alessandra Amoroso, Patty Pravo, Nina Zilli, Gianna Nannini, Bianca Atzei, Aida Cooper, Paola Turci	Amiche in Arena
"Così diversa"	2017	Francesco Renga	Scriverò il tuo nome Live
"Sobrio"	2018	Guè	Sinatra
"Vola mio mini pony"	2018	Cristina D'Avena	Duets
"Friday Night"	2019	Burak Yeter	Non-album song
"Catrame (Piano solo)"	2019	Lazza, Tedua	Re Mida
"Lontana da te"	2020	Priestess	Rendez-vous
"Xy"	2021	Margherita Vicario	Bingo
"Dimmi di sbagliato che c'è 2021"	2021	Sottotono	Originali
"La coda del diavolo (MTV Unplugged)"	2021	Rkomi	Taxi Driver (MTV Unplugged)
"Luglio"	2022	Elisa, Giorgia, Roshelle	Ritorno al futuro/Back to the Future
"Vertigine" (Live)	2022	Elisa	Back to the Future Live
"Bagno a mezzanotte" (Live)	2022	Elisa	Back to the Future Live
"Luglio" (Live)	2022	Elisa, Giorgia, Roshelle	Back to the Future Live
"Festival"	2023	Paola & Chiara	Per sempre
"Due"	2024	Raf	Raf40: The Unreleased Duets
"Ci andremo insieme"	2024	Luca Marinelli, Riccardo Suarez, Edoardo Stoppacciaro, Alberto Malanchino	Mufasa: The Lion King
"Lo so, sei tu"	2024	Luca Marinelli	Mufasa: The Lion King

== Music videos ==
=== As musical artist ===
List of music videos as musical artist
Title	Year	Other artist(s)	Director(s)
"Amore avrai"	2016	None	Luisa Carcavale
"L'imperfezione della vita"	2016	None	Alessandra Alfieri
"Tutta colpa mia"	2017	None	Gaetano Morbioli
"Verrà da sé"	2017	None	Gaetano Morbioli
"Semplice"	2017	None	Gaetano Morbioli
"Quando stiamo bene"	2018	Zibba	Megan Stancanelli
"Nero Bali"	2018	Michele Bravi, Guè	Enea Colombi
"Rambla"	2018	Ghemon	Enea Colombi
"Pensare male"	2019	The Kolors	Attilio Cusani
"Margarita"	2019	Marracash	Attilio Cusani
"Le ragazze di Porta Venezia - The Manifesto"	2019	Myss Keta, LaPina, Joan Thiele, Priestess, Roshelle	Simone Rovellini
"Non è la fine"	2020	Gemitaiz	Attilio Cusani
"Mal di testa"	2020	Fabri Fibra	Attilio Cusani
"Andromeda"	2020	None	Attilio Cusani
"Diamanti" (Visual)	2020	Ernia	Dario Garegnani
"Guaranà"	2020	None	Attilio Cusani
"Ciclone"	2020	Takagi & Ketra, Mariah	YouNuts!
"Parli parli"	2020	Carl Brave	Fabrizio Conte
"Vertigine"	2021	None	Attilio Cusani
"Vertigine" (Live Performance)	2021	None	Attilio Cusani
"Bagno a mezzanotte"	2022	None	Morelli Brothers
"Tribale"	2022	None	Attilio Cusani
"Tribale" (Dance video)	2022	None	Attilio Cusani
"Proiettili (ti mangio il cuore)"	2022	Joan Thiele	Roberto Ortu
"Proiettili (ti mangio il cuore)" (Live Performance)	2022	Joan Thiele	Jim Wilmont
"OK. Respira"	2022	None	Giampaolo Sgura
"Purple in the Sky" (Visual)	2023	None	Giampaolo Sgura
"Due"	2023	None	Giampaolo Sgura
"Pazza musica"	2023	Marco Mengoni	Roberto Ortu
"A fari spenti"	2023	None	Morelli Brothers
"Red Light" (Visual)	2023	None	Morelli Brothers
"Elle" (Visual)	2023	None	Morelli Brothers
"Glamour" (Visual)	2023	None	Morelli Brothers
"Euphoria" (Visual)	2023	None	Morelli Brothers
"Ascendente" (Visual)	2023	None	Morelli Brothers
"Lontano da qui" (Visual)	2023	None	Morelli Brothers
"Black Nirvana"	2024	None	Attilio Cusani
"Feeling"	2024	Tiziano Ferro	Morelli Beothers
"Dimenticarsi alle 7"	2025	None	Attilio Cusani
"Mi ami mi odi"	2025	None	Attilio Cusani
"Yakuza"	2025	Sfera Ebbasta	Mattia Bonato; Sfera Ebbasta
"Ex"	2025	Irama	Attilio Cusani

=== Guest appearances ===
List of music videos as an actress
Title	Year	Other artist(s)	Director(s)
"La risposta"	2012	Luchè	Mauro Russo
"Beautiful Disaster"	2015	Fedez and Mika	Mauro Russo
"Monica"	2018	Myss Keta	Motel Forlanini
"La mia hit"	2020	J-Ax feat. Max Pezzali	Fabrizio Conte
"Crazy Love"	2021	Marracash	Giulio Rosati
