= A fari spenti =

2023 single by Elodie

Single by Elodie

from the album Red Light
- Language: Italian
- Released: 22 September 2023
- Recorded: 2023
- Genre: Dance pop
- Length: 3:13
- Label: Island
- Songwriters: Elodie Di Patrizi; Elisa Toffoli; Alessandro Pulga; Stefano Tognini
- Producers: Marz; Zef

Elodie singles chronology
"Pazza musica" (2023)	"A fari spenti" (2023)	"Anche stasera" (2023)

Music video
- "A fari spenti" on YouTube

"A fari spenti" (lit. 'Headlights off') is a song co-written and recorded by Italian singer Elodie. It was released on 22 September 2023 through Island Records, as the lead single from her mixtape Red Light.

== Composition ==
The song is the fourth one written by Elisa for Elodie, following the singles "Vertigine", "Bagno a mezzanotte" and "Proiettili (ti mangio il cuore)". The song is produced by Italian duo Zef e Marz.

== Reception ==
Alessandro Alicandri of TV Sorrisi e Canzoni described the sounds likened to "an irresistible minimal techno," calling it an "impervious and fascinating" choice for an Italian female artist. Dwelling on the lyrics, Alicandri wrote that they are proposed "with different images" narrated "with a non-narrative but dreamlike sense."

Claudio Cabona of Rockol wrote that the song sanctions Elodie's choice to "continue experimenting in the world of dance pop," as the sound adopted turns out to be "the real added value," defined as "a Berlin club electronica, sinuous, enveloping with a beating heart." The journalist considered that although the lyrics "do not stand out for originality," they "fit" perfectly into the production, describing "the evanescence of moments that composed a relationship, it is a flow of thoughts and images.

== Music video and controversy ==
The video, directed by the Morelli Brothers, was available in concomitance with the release of the single through Elodie's YouTube channel.

The video caused a controversy in the Italian press and on social network as Elodie appears nude in some shots. Numerous social media users criticized the singer's choice, describing it as a sexual objectification of the female body for promotional purposes. In response to the criticism, Elodie posted, via Instagram stories, photographs of covers and music videos in which male singers were portrayed nude, including Biagio Antonacci for Vanity Fair Italia, Tupac Shakur in a shot by David LaChapelle, and Robbie Williams photographed for the cover of Under the Radar.

Mario Manca of Vanity Fair Italia described the singer's image positively, associating her with Botticelli's Botticelli's Venus, calling her "magnetic, ethereal and beautiful." Fanpage.it associated the pose decision with singer-songwriter Alanis Morissette's video for the single "Thank U", stating that "it is customary for female artists to be judged for the use of their bodies, especially when they decide to show them naked, while when it is men who show themselves [...] completely naked there is no discussion about how this may or may not affect their careers".

Writing about the controversy over the video, Filippo Ferrari of Rolling Stone Italia reported that there is a cultural problem in Italy, as "we are people who have never seen anything" about the "role of the body in the world of music and art." Ferrari stressed that if after contemporary female artists such as Madonna, Rihanna, Beyoncé and Nicki Minaj "we are still here to be sticklers about pop stars who decide to take their clothes off, it really means that there is no hope" since "here, female artists are considered credible only if they are huddled up, maybe with a nice guitar in their hands. Men, on the other hand, are also fine naked, whether born abroad or within Italy" and that Elodie "is simply being a pop star, both in image and music."

== Charts ==
Chart (2023)	Peak position
Italy (FIMI)	21
Italy Airplay (EarOne)	1

== Certifications ==
Region	Certification	Certified units/sales
Italy (FIMI)	Platinum	100,000^{‡}
^{‡} Sales+streaming figures based on certification alone.
