= OK. Respira =

Studio album by Elodie
- Released: 10 February 2023
- Recorded: 2021–2022
- Genres: Pop; R&B
- Length: 48:24
- Label: Island Records
- Producers: Dardust; Drillionaire; d.whale; E.D.D.; Emanuele Triglia; ITACA; Joan Thiele; Katoo; Marz; Zef

Elodie chronology
This Is Elodie (2020)	OK. Respira (2023)	Mi ami mi odi (2025)

Singles from OK. Respira
- 1. "Vertigine" Released: 24 September 2021; 2. "Bagno a mezzanotte" Released: 9 March 2022; 3. "Tribale" Released: 10 June 2022; 4. "Proiettili (ti mangio il cuore)" Released: 16 September 2022; 5. "OK. Respira" Released: 9 December 2022; 6. "Due" Released: 8 February 2023

OK. Respira is the fourth studio album by Italian singer Elodie, released on 10 February 2023 by Island Records.

The album featured "Due", presented by the singer during the Sanremo Music Festival 2023 where it took ninth in the final ranking, and the original song "Proiettili (ti mangio il cuore)" from the soundtrack of the film Burning Hearts, winner of the David di Donatello for Best Original Song. It was the best-selling female album in 2023 in Italy.

== Composition ==
The album consists of thirteen tracks, eleven of which were written by the singer herself, with the co-writing contribution by her long-time collaborators Elisa Toffoli, Federica Abbate, Joan Thiele, Alessandro Mahmood, Davide Petrella, and production by Francesco "Katoo" Cattiti, Dardust, Drillionaire, ITACA and Zef. In an interview for Vanity Fair Italia, Elodie explained the process of producing and writing the songs on the album:

"I had the immense opportunity to be able to collaborate with a group of artists with whom I have an important relationship, from Dardust to Mahmood to Federica Abbate, Elisa, Davide Petrella, all people who have built my path. I was able to tell my story, to collaborate for the first time on writing, to bring my desire into the songs. It is difficult for performers to get their vision across. It has everything in it, from my belly singing to the four-person box. I hope you can hear that it's the most in-focus record I've done so far. [...] Almost the whole album is from those 10 days we spent together [in Tuscany]. I am a fragile woman but at the same time proud of my frailties. I tell my fears with a lot of honesty but also firmness. I hope I am not just another one."

The singer also told about her relationship with singer Elisa, co-writer of three songs on the album:

"Our first interaction was at Amici di Maria De Filippi. Elisa didn't talk much, but she read an uneasiness in me, she saw something in me that humanly she also had when she was young. I welcomed this approach of hers. It was gradual and now, after a few years, we now have the freedom of not having to tell each other. Each of us knows. It is an immense honor to work with her, I think she is truly the most complete and evolved artist we have. She is not afraid to confront herself. I am fortunate."

== Critics reception ==
Professional ratings
Review scores
Source	Rating
Newsic.it	6.75/10
OndaRock	6.5/10
Rockol	7.5/10

Claudio Cabona of Rockol described the project as "the sharpest snapshot of today's Elodie," thanks to "quality pop and dance songs" that "were able to tell the story of the singer's transformation." Cabona also stressed that the songs are "able to break away from much of what we listen to in Italy," becoming as a whole "a valuable vision for the Italian scene." Marco Macchi of Newsic.it appreciated Elodie's musical evolution undertaken within OK. Respira, highlighting how the record turns out to be "contemporary electro-pop" thanks to the work done by the production team, citing Dardust of all people, concluding that the singer has become "the perfect Italian dancefloor star, between Madonna and Kylie Minogue."

Silvia Gianatti of Vanity Fair Italia, on the other hand, indicated that the songs "show her pop soul" of "contemporary sounds," in which "Elodie looks at herself in the mirror, learns from mistakes, shows herself more fragile" believing that the producers and authors "have been able to tell her story, without hiding those fears [...] that make her helpless in the face of abuse." Gabriele Fazio of Agenzia Giornalistica Italia claimed that the album represents one of " the most authentic pop manifestations possibly in the entire history of Italian music," finding, however, that it elicited a "deadly boredom" from the listener because the songs "do not pretend to communicate anything, but only to function on a sonic level."

== Track listing ==
OK. Respira – Standard track listing
No.	Title	Writer(s)	Producer(s)	Length
1.	"Purple in the Sky"	Elodie Di Patrizi; Alessandro Mahmoud; Davide Petrella; Dario Faini	Dardust	3:52
2.	"Danse la vie"	Elodie; Federica Abbate; Jacopo Ettorre; Faini	Dardust	3:12
3.	"Strobo"	Elodie; Petrella; Faini	Dardust	3:46
4.	"Due"	Elodie; Abbate; Ettorre; Francesco Catitti; Faini	Dardust; Katoo	3:13
5.	"OK. Respira"	Elodie; Alessandra Joan Thiele; Abbate; Ettorre; Leonardo Grillotti; Federico Mercuri; Giordano Cremona; Eugenio Maimone	ITACA	2:41
6.	"Mai più"	Elodie; Mahmoud; Petrella; Faini; Stefano Tognini	Dardust	3:09
7.	"Bagno a mezzanotte"	Elisa Toffoli; Alessandro Pulga; Tognini	Marz; Zef	2:58
8.	"Boy Boy Boy"	Elodie; Thiele; Adel Al Kassem; Diego Vincenzo Vettraino	Drillionaire	2:09
9.	"Tribale"	Elodie; Ettorre; Abbate; Maimone; Mercuri; Cremona; Ettorre; Grillotti	ITACA	2:42
10.	"Apocalisse"	Elodie; Mahmoud; Faini	Dardust	3:48
11.	"Vertigine"	Toffoli; Petrella; Faini	Dardust	3:37
12.	"Una come cento"	Elodie; Mahmoud; Catitti	Katoo	3:13
13.	"Proiettili (ti mangio il cuore)" (with Joan Thiele)	Elodie; Thiele; Toffoli; Emanuele Triglia	Thiele; Triglia	3:16
Total length:				48:24

OK. Respira – Digital reissue bonus tracks
No.	Title	Writer(s)	Producer(s)	Length
6.	"Pazza musica" (with Marco Mengoni)	Paolo Antonacci; Petrella; Davide Simonetta; Tognini	EDD; Simonetta; Zef	3:15
Total length:				51:39

== Charts ==
=== Weekly charts ===
Weekly chart performance for OK. Respira
Chart (2023)	Peak position
Italian Albums (FIMI)	4

=== Year-end charts ===
Year-end chart performance for OK. Respira
Chart (2023)	Position
Italian Albums (FIMI)	20

== Certifications ==
Certifications for OK. Respira
Region	Certification	Certified units/sales
Italy (FIMI)	2× Platinum	100,000^{‡}
^{‡} Sales+streaming figures based on certification alone.

== Personnel ==
=== Musicians ===
- Elodie – lead vocals (all tracks), songwriting (tracks 1-6, 8-9, 12-13)
- Adel Al Kassem – songwriting (track 8)
- Alessandra Joan Thiele – co-lead vocals (track 13), songwriting (tracks 5, 8, 13), production (track 13)
- Alessandro Mahmoud – songwriting (tracks 1, 6, 10, 12), backing vocals (track 1)
- Alessandro Pulga – production and songwriting (track 7)
- Dario Faini – production and songwriting (tracks 1-4, 6, 10-11)
- Davide Petrella – songwriting (tracks 1, 3, 6, 11, bonus)
- Davide Simonetta – songwriting and production (bonus track)
- Diego Vincenzo Vettraino – production and songwriting (track 8)
- Elisa Toffoli – songwriting (tracks 7, 11, 13), uncredited vocals (track 7)
- Emanuele Triglia production and songwriting track 13)
- Eugenio Maimone – production tracks 5, 9)
- Federica Abbate – songwriting (tracks 2, 4-5, 9)
- Federico Mercuri – co-production (tracks 5, 9)
- Francesco Catitti – production and songwriting (tracks 4, 12)
- Giordano Cremona – co-production (track 5, 9)
- Jacopo Ettorre – songwriting (tracks 2, 4-5, 9)
- Leonardo Grillotti – songwriting (tracks 5, 9)
- Marco Mengoni – co-lead vocals (bonus track)
- Paolo Antonacci – songwriter (bonus track)
- Stefano Tognini – production (track 7, bonus), songwriting tracks 6-7, bonus)

=== Management ===
- Elodie Di Patrizi – executive production
- Max Brigante – executive production
- Jacopo Pesce – executive production
