= Roshelle =

Italian singer-songwriter

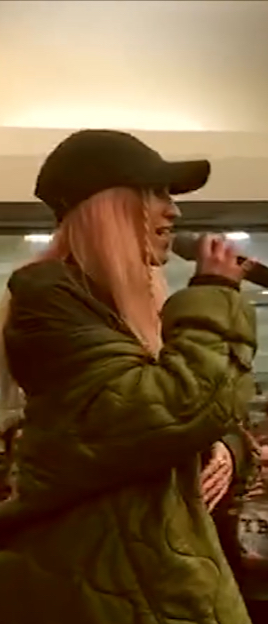

Background information
- Born: Rossella Discolo; 18 September 1995 (age 30); Lodi, Lombardy, Italy
- Genres: Pop; R&B; hip hop
- Occupations: Singer; songwriter; rapper; musician
- Instruments: Vocals; piano; guitar
- Years active: 2016–present
- Labels: Sony Music (2016–2020); Universal Music (2020–2023)

Rossella Discolo (born 18 September 1995), best known as Roshelle, is an Italian singer-songwriter.

Roshelle became popular after participating in the tenth edition of X Factor, where she finished fourth in the competition.

== Early life ==
Born and raised in Lodi, she immediately approached music starting to sing at the age of three, also influenced and pushed by her parents who have always been very close to the world of entertainment and art. During her elementary school period she was recruited into the choir of the Lodi Cathedral. Soon after, she began to study first guitar and then piano which she will study for eleven years, first privately and then at the Accademia Franchino Gaffurio in Lodi, where she also continued her training in singing and choreutes. In her teenage years she became very passionate about American hip hop music, developing during the high school years a predisposition for rap music. In 2014, she opened together her boyfriend and former manager her YouTube channel thus giving life to the real musical project Roshelle, in the channel the artist proposed covers of famous pieces, in which she also demonstrates her skills in freestyle by rewriting or adding to cover rap rhymes written by herself in English.

== Career ==
=== X Factor and the record deal with Sony (2016) ===
In the summer of 2016, she auditioned for the tenth season of the Italian X Factor; at the same audition took part her younger sister Cristiana who unfortunately didn't pass the first step of the audition. At the auditions Roshelle presented a reinterpretation of "Lighters" by Bad Meets Evil and Bruno Mars, in which she also added her own freestyle in English, gaining the four yeses of the judges and the standing ovation from the public. In the bootcamp phase Roshelle performed "Black Widow" by Iggy Azalea and Rita Ora, adding even this time an English freestyle in the performance. Passing all the initial steps of the program, the singer advanced to the live shows of the program taking part of the Girls category, led by rapper Fedez. During the live shows Roshelle had the chance to perform her debut pop and electronic single "What U Do to Me", produced by Merk & Kremont. She reached the final of the competition and finished in 4th position. Although she didn't win the talent show, Sony Music Italy decided to sign Roshelle after the popularity she gained during the show, and later the label decided to release her first solo EP and work on the debut album. Roshelle's debut single "What U Do to Me", released on December 9, 2016, first climbed at the top of the Italian iTunes singles charts and was later certified platinum after ranking 3rd position on the FIMI chart. In the same chart her cover of Animal, a song by Yelawolf, made for the show ranked at number 89.

=== The debut EP, first singles and collaboration (2017-2019) ===
After the end of X Factor, Sony Music Italy released the first EP of Roshelle What U Do to Me, which takes its title from the debut single of the same name. The project includes the covers performed by the singer during the talent show: "Animal" by Yelawolf, "Cold Water" by Major Lazer and Justin Bieber, "Heavydirtysoul" by Twenty One Pilots and "Doo Wop (That Thing)" by Lauryn Hill; the EP is now certified gold in Italy. At the beginning of 2017 Roshelle promoted her debut EP with a mini tour called Anymal Tour and soon after she was defined by Vogue Italia as one of the new Italian artists to watch for 2017. In the same year Roshelle began working on her debut album: seen her predisposition for English music, her label initially aimed to create a project with international sounds and in English language. On 9 June 2017 was released her second single, a pop, trap and electronic song entitled "Body Ady": the song was written and composed between Milan and Los Angeles with the collaboration of the record company Pulse Music Group, the song is produced by The Monsters & Strangerz, it's written by Raja Kumari and Ferras. On April 13, 2018, the third single released entitled Drink, a single characterized by a pop, funk and disco sound, the single debuted at 67th position in the official Italian single chart FIMI. The video of the song is a short films, written by Roshelle herself and directed by Andrea Folino. In mid-2018, Sony changed the direction of Roshelle's recording project, abandoning the idea of an international and English-language album in favor of an Italian-language project with urban sounds. Roshelle thus began to work with Don Joe and from their collaboration was born the artist's first single in Italian, entitled "Tutti Frutty!" and was released on 31 October 2018. The single achieved an immediate success on the web, exceeding a million views in a short time and causing several controversies regarding a scene in which the singer appears naked on a white horse in a deserted Milan. 2019 was a year full of collaborations for Roshelle: she was chosen by Italian rapper Myss Keta for the remix of the single "Le ragazze di Porta Venezia" together with Joan Thiele, La Pina, Elodie and Priestess and a few months later she collaborated with Nek in the song Together we win for the Italian biscuits Ringo commercial. In August 2019, she released the single "Mama", in collaboration with Lele Blade, characterized by urban and Latin sounds, produced by Italian multiplatinum producer Michele Canova.

=== The signing with Island Records Italy and Universal (2020-2024) ===
On January 9, 2020, the single "Rosa naturale" was released, which featured a collaboration with Italian rapper Emis Killa, the song is written by the same Roshelle and the Italian singer Mahmood. The single was Roshelle's last to be released through Sony Music Italy, it ranked at number 74th on the Italian official single chart of FIMI. Also in 2020, on the occasion of the re-release of his album Emanuele, she collaborated with Italian rapper Geolier for the remix of the song "Na catena", which ranked at number 64th on the Italian official single chart of FIMI and which is now certified platinum. After meeting Jacopo Pesce and Shablo, the same team of Italian rapper Sfera Ebbasta, she signed with Island Records Italy and Universal Music Italia. On 7 October 2020 her first single with the new record company titled "00:23" was released: the single talks about the singer's fear of not being able to leave a mark in the world, but also of a relationship that the singer had with a woman and then ended; to confirm the relationship was the singer herself during an interview with Le Iene. On November 11, 2020, the single "7 giorni" was released, which is an R&B midtempo. On April 30, 2021, Italian rapper Rkomi released his third album entitled Taxi Driver which reached the number 1 on the official Italian album chart of FIMI, one of the song of the album called Interlude seen the collaboration of Roshelle as featured artist. On May 12, 2021, Roshelle released her third single with Island Records Italy called Ti Amo, Ti odio featuring Gué Pequeno, Mecna and Shablo who also produced the record together Luca Faraone. On December 3, 2021, his first unreleased EP ′′ Sentimental Season ′′ is released on all Digital Stores, achieving good success for his listeners. After various feats. with Rizzo in "Forte Forte and with Elisa, Elodie and Giorgia in "Luglio" in 2022. In 2023 she disappeared from social networks to then return to TV as presenter and judge in the program "The Rap Game Italia and returned to the music scene after a year with the song "Nella tana del mostro" (2023). In 2023 he also publishes the singles "Melancholia" and "Caffè e lacrime", which mark a phase of artistic transition, characterized by more intimate and introspective sounds compared to previous works.

In 2024 he participates as a guest artist on the song "Ex" by Vale Lambo. At the same time, Roshelle declares that she has an album of unpublished releases ready.

=== The first studio album with the BMG record label (2025-present) ===
In 2025, she signed a recording contract with BMG, marking a new chapter in her career.

On February 6, 2026, she released the single "L'origine del mondo", serving as the lead single from her debut studio album, Mangiami pure, which was released on March 27, 2026. The album was produced by Tommaso Ottomano. On February 18, 2026, she shared a live performance of the track "Musa," on her YouTube channel, recorded at the Pasticceria Martesana workshop in Milan with a string quartet and piano; the recording was later released on digital platforms. On March 10, 2026, the second single "Sola tra le nuvole" was released, accompanied by an official visual video.

Following the album's release, on April 14, 2026, Roshelle published a live version of "Limbo" on YouTube, followed by its digital release on streaming platforms on April 17. The performance continues the visual and acoustic narrative established with the previous live sessions.

== Musical influences ==
Roshelle is very influenced by American hip hop and R&B music and among her main musical influences she cites Beyoncé, Lauryn Hill, Ariana Grande, Whitney Houston, Rihanna, Rosalìa, Bad Bunny and rapper Mac Miller to whom she dedicated a tattoo as she defined Mac Miller as the artist who bring her closer to hip hop music. In an interview for Marie Claire, the singer declared that she was also inspired by the Neapolitan song, as one of her first memories related to music concerns the song "E pazzielle" by Teresa De Sio that her mother made her and her brothers listen to.

== Discography ==
=== Studio albums ===
List of studio albums, with details and chart positions
Title	Album details	Peak chart positions
Title	Album details	ITA
Mangiami pure	Released: 27 March 2026; Label: BMG Rights Management; Format: LP, CD, Digital download, streaming	—

=== Extended plays ===
List of extended plays, with chart positions and certifications
Title	EP details	Peak chart positions	Certifications
Title	EP details	ITA	Certifications
What U Do to Me	Released: 9 December 2016; Label: Sony Music; Format: CD, digital download	4	FIMI: Gold
Sentimental Season	Released: 3 December 2021; Label: Universal Music, Island Records; Format: digital download	—	
"—" denotes an item that did not chart in that country.

=== Singles ===
As lead artist

- 2016 – "What U Do to Me"
- 2017 – "Body Ady"
- 2018 – "Drink"
- 2018 – "Tutti Frutty"
- 2019 – "Mama" (featuring Lele Blade)
- 2020 – "Rosa naturale" (featuring Emis Killa)
- 2020 – "00:23"
- 2020 – "7 giorni"
- 2020 – "Vernice" (Tommy Dali featuring Roshelle)
- 2021 – "Ti amo, ti odio" (featuring Gué Pequeno, Mecna, Shablo)
- 2021 - "Segreti" (Young Kali featuring Roshelle)
- 2023 – "Nella tana del mostro"
- 2023 – "Melancholia"
- 2023 – "Caffè e lacrime"
- 2026 – "L’origine del mondo"
- 2026 — "Sola tra le nuvole"
- 2026 — "Veleno"

Promotional singles

- 2019 — "Basement Café Next Gen: Tredici Pietro & Roshelle" (Tredici Pietro and Roshelle)
- 2019 – "Dove inizia il cielo" (Nek featuring Roshelle)
- 2021 – "Come fai, come fai"
- 2026 — "Musa, (Live al laboratorio di pasticceria)"
- 2026 — "Limbo (Live al laboratorio di pasticceria)"

Guest artist

- 2019 – "Le ragazze di Porta Venezia – The Manifesto" (Myss Keta featuring Elodie, Joan Thiele, Roshelle, La Pina, Priestess)
- 2020 – "Na catena (RMX)" (Geolier featuring Roshelle)
- 2021 – "To the Stars" (Jimmy Sax featuring Roshelle)
- 2021 – "Paradiso vs. Inferno (Interlude)" (Rkomi featuring Roshelle)
- 2022 – "Luglio" (Elisa featuring Elodie, Giorgia, Roshelle)
- 2022 – "Like a Melody" (Serena Brancale featuring Roshelle)
- 2022 – "Forte forte" (Rizzo featuring Roshelle)
- 2024 – "Ex" (Vale Lambo featuring Roshelle)

== Television ==
- X Factor Italy, (Sky Uno 2016)-competitor
- Yo!MTV RAPS, (MTV 2020)-guest
- Le Iene, (Italia 1 2020)-guest
- Stanzadilego, (Twich 2022)-guest
- The Rap Game Italia, (Raiplay 2023)- judge/host
- Bar Stella, (Rai 2, 26 April 2023)-guest

== Tournée ==
- 2017 – Anymal Tour
- 2026 – Roshelle Dal Vivo
