= Due (song) =

2023 single by Elodie

Single by Elodie

from the album OK. Respira
- Language: Italian
- Released: 8 February 2023
- Recorded: 2022
- Genre: R&B
- Length: 3:13
- Label: Island
- Songwriters: Elodie Di Patrizi; Federica Abbate; Jacopo Ettore; Francesco Catitti; Dario Faini
- Producers: Dardust; Katoo

Elodie singles chronology
"OK. Respira" (2022)	"Due" (2023)	"Pazza musica" (2023)

Music video
- "Due" on YouTube

"Due" (transl. "Two") is a song co-written and recorded by Italian singer Elodie. It was released on 8 February 2023 through Island Records as the sixth single from her fourth studio album OK. Respira.

The song was the artist's entry for the 2023 edition of the Sanremo Music Festival, placing ninth in a field of 28.

== Background and composition ==
The song featured the singer's return to writing collaboration with Jacopo Ettore, Federica Abbate and Francesco "Katoo" Catitti, the latter a producer of the same along with Dardust. The singer told the process of making the song through a public statement:

"I knew it was the right song as soon as I listened to Federica [Abbate]'s recording, first of all because it is well written. It's a hit. It's perfect. Even just musically it captivated me. At first it scared me, the approach was vocally difficult, but instead now I love it. It's fun to sing it. Pop is a simple language, but there is complex thinking behind pop."

In an interview with Elle Italia, Elodie addressed the meaning of the song and her relationship with Abbate during the composition process:

"With "Due" it was love and hate. Federica Abbate and I were at a similar time in our lives: an incredible coincidence, and I'm a big believer in coincidences. [...] It's a song very much my own but, at the same time, difficult; [...] At the heart of the song is a love that ended, singing it helped me to metabolize the end of that love story of mine."

== Critics reception ==
Andrea Laffranchi of Corriere della Sera gave a rating of 8 out of 10 to the song, explaining that it features "urban sounds" with "pulsating percussion," while the lyrics, pertaining to "a love just born but already ended badly, of interrupted phone calls," have been likened to that of Mina's "Se telefonando". Valentina Colosimo of Vanity Fair called "Due" a "perfect urban-sounding" track with a "brilliant" interpretation, finding the singer "more refined," likening the song more to "Andromeda" rather than "Bagno a Mezzanotte". Rockol's writer Gianni Sibilla associated the opening section with New Order's "True Faith", describing the second parta as "a pop with a complex structure."

Rolling Stone Italia gave the single the highest rating regarding the songs presented during the first night of the Sanremo Festival, with a score of 8 out of 10; according to the website's reviewer Filippo Ferrari, "Due" represented "an uptempo, somewhat funky piece" that sounded similar to her collaboration "Pensare male" with The Kolors. Gianni Poglio of Panorama said that thanks to the song, "Elodie's potential, [...] moves on the terrain of international pop," with "fiery vocals and powerful song." Andrea Conti of Il Fatto Quotidiano explained that it is a "modern and topical" song with lyrics that deal with "a complex relationship, a sort of aut aut aut."

== Music video ==
The music video was shot at the RedRooms Members Club in Milan, Italy, with the direction of Giampaolo Sgura. It was available with the launch of the single through the singer's YouTube channel.

The video starred the singer's sister Fey Di Patrizi and some Italian show business personalities such as Ornella Vanoni, Michele Placido and Valentina Romani.

== Charts ==
=== Weekly charts ===
Weekly chart performance for "Due"
Chart (2023)	Peak position
Italy (FIMI)	7
Italy Airplay (EarOne)	2
Switzerland (Schweizer Hitparade)	67

=== Year-end charts ===
Year-end chart performance for "Due"
Chart (2023)	Position
Italy (FIMI)	32

== Certifications ==
Region	Certification	Certified units/sales
Italy (FIMI)	3× Platinum	300,000^{‡}
^{‡} Sales+streaming figures based on certification alone.
