= Priestess (rapper) =

Italian rapper (born 1996)

- Born: Alessandra Prete; 20 August 1996 (age 29); Locorotondo, Italy
- Genres: Hip hop; pop rap; trap
- Occupation: Rapper
- Years active: 2017–present
- Labels: Tanta Roba; Universal

Alessandra Prete (born 20 August 1996), known by her stage name Priestess, is an Italian rapper from Apulia inspired by trap. Her influences include Rihanna, Etta James, and David Bowie whose music often explores the state of modern women through naming songs after women throughout every historical era of feminism.

She was the subject of a documentary, The 4th Wave (in reference to fourth-wave feminism), directed by Savanah Leaf that premiered at the Tribeca Festival in 2019.

Prete's fashion efforts include the campaign Spirit Of with Foot Locker, where she was one of three artists (one each from the UK, France, and Italy) selected; Prete acted as the "Gratitude Spirit."

== Discography ==
=== Studio albums ===
- 2019 — Brava (Tanta Roba)

=== EPs ===
- 2017 — Torno domani (Tanta Roba, Universal)
- 2020 — Rendez-vous (Tanta Roba, Universal)

=== Singles ===
- 2017 — "Amica pusher"
- 2017 — "Maria Antonietta / Torno domani"
- 2017 — "Cleopatra"
- 2017 — "Amica pusher"
- 2018 — "Eva"
- 2018 — "Fata Morgana"
- 2019 — "Brigitte"
- 2019 — "Chef" (with Madman)
- 2022 — "Lama d’argento"
- 2023 — "Tutto bene"
- 2024 — "Mata hari" (con Maruego e Nine)
- 2025 — "Spezza Cuori"

=== Guest Artist ===
- 2019 – "Le ragazze di Porta Venezia – The Manifesto" (Myss Keta featuring Elodie, Joan Thiele, Roshelle, La Pina, Priestess)
- 2020 — "Estate" (con i Selton)
