= Taxi Driver (Rkomi album) =

Third studio album by Italian rapper Rkomi

Studio album by Rkomi
- Released: April 30, 2021
- Genres: Pop; rock; hip hop; urban; R&B
- Length: 41:03
- Labels: Thaurus; Island
- Producers: Dardust; Daves The Kid; Federico Nardelli; Francesco "Katoo" Catitti; Junior K; Luca Faraone; Mace; Marquis; Rkomi; Shablo; Swan; The Night Skinny; Simon Says

Rkomi chronology
Dove gli occhi non arrivano (2019)	Taxi Driver (2021)	No stress (2023)

Singles from Taxi driver
- 1. "Ho spento il cielo" Released: 14 April 2021; 2. "Partire da te" Released: 11 June 2021; 3. "Luna piena" Released: 27 August 2021; 4. "La coda del diavolo" Released: 3 December 2021; 5. "Insuperabile" Released: 2 February 2022; 6. "Ossa rotte" Released: 17 June 2022

Taxi Driver is the third studio album by Italian rapper Rkomi, released by Island Records on 30 April 2021.

The album peaked at number one on the Italian Albums Chart, becoming the best-selling album of 2021 in Italy. and the second one in 2022. It was certified eight platinum by FIMI. In 2022, a remastering of the album Taxi Driver + was released, which featured the song "Insuperabile" which competed at the 72nd Sanremo Music Festival, and Italian Singles Chart topper collaboration "La coda del diavolo" with Elodie.

== Concept and compostition ==
The album was written and produced by the artist himself, with several collaborations, including Dardust, Mahmood, Tommaso Paradiso, Gazzelle, Ariete, Irama, Sfera Ebbasta, Roshelle, Ernia and Gaia. Taxi Driver continued Rkomi's departure from rap to pop music, also showing rock influences. Its tracks are built with a cantautore approach, and create a heterogeneous mix of influences. In an interview with Rolling Stone Italia, Rkomi explained the inspiration behind the collaborations and the blending of different musical genres:

"With the collaborations with musicians like Jovanotti and Elisa: [...] for me it was enlightening, because I realized that until then I had missed a lot of things. I knew hip hop well, but I didn't know anything about everything else and I had no idea that you could work in another way as well. [...] I didn't feel the adrenaline, the thrill of risk anymore. Then came the idea for Taxi Driver, an album of atypical collaborations, able to cross many different territories, from indie to trap to pop to rock to singer-songwriter, "bringing" guests into their homes. Even at the risk of ending up in places where I don't find myself. [...] I don't think there is this big difference between a singer-songwriter and a rapper, except in the deeper, simple but not trivial approach. I would like my audience, sooner or later, to shine the way mine shine when I listen to a piece by Lucio Dalla or Lucio Battisti."

The album was titled after Martin Scorsese's 1976 film, which is also cited in its artwork, showing Rkomi leaning on a yellow cab. The title of the album also refers to the film, used as an expedient by the artist to narrate the concept behind the album as told in an interview with Vanity Fair Italia:

"I have seen it at least six times. It's a disruptive film, I like to see all the personalities of Travis Bickle, I love Robert De Niro. I liked the image of the cab because of the concept of the album, which is full of passengers, my guests, who I take around the city into unfamiliar territories. Then there is also the idea of De Niro's Vietnam, which in my case is my past, with due proportion."

== Critical reception ==
Claudio Cabona of Rockol described the artist as "capable of spanning genres" yet not finding him completely in focus. Cabona appreciated the lyrics, in which he finds a "singer-songwriter approach," through which he "describe simple moments with great evocative power," through metaphors and similes, which gain strength with the artists involved for "the willingness to make real duets and not dull, packaged collaborations." However, the journalist stressed that "too much heterogeneity runs the risk of resulting in a lack of precise identity" finding it at times a "playlist album" presenting "sounds that have already been dissected" and finding "little care in diversifying the storytelling around the guests."

Antonio Silvestri of Ondarock dwelled on the singer's flow, remarking that "the suppleness has remained" but he tends toward the pop sung by Carl Brave x Franco126. The journalist stated that the singer "now inhabits a borderline territory, happily exploring its possibilities and declining his idea of hybrid in different ways," finding as his best moments "the Latin sophistication" of "Mare che non sei" with Gaia, the "very free reinterpretation of Lucio Battisti's classic" in "10 ragazze" with Ernia and "the balance between r'n'b, pop and rap" in Cancelli di mezzanotte.

== Track listing ==
Taxi Driver – Standard track listing
No.	Title	Lyrics	Music	Producers	Length
1.	"Intro"	Mirko Martorana	Pietro Spinelli	Rkomi	1:24
2.	"Partire da te"	Martorana; Alessandro Mahmood	Umberto Odoguardi; Francesco Catitti	Katoo	3:41
3.	"Ho spento il cielo" (featuring Tommaso Paradiso)	Martorana; Tommaso Paradiso	Dario Faini	Dardust	3:52
4.	"Me o le mie canzoni?" (featuring Gazzelle)	Martorana; Flavio Bruno Pardini	Federico Nardelli; Luca Pace	The Night Skinny; Nardelli	2:47
5.	"Diecimilavoci" (featuring Ariete)	Martorana; Arianna Del Giaccio	Nicolò Scalabrin; Pablo Miguel Lombroni Capalbo; Luca Faraone	Shablo	2:50
6.	"Luna piena" (featuring Irama)	Martorana; Filippo Maria Fanti	Scalabrin; Lombroni Capalbo; Faraone	Shablo	2:46
7.	"Nuovo range" (featuring Sfera Ebbasta and Junior K)	Martorana; Gionata Boschetti	Odoguardi; Scalabrin	Junior K	2:56
8.	"Paradiso vs. inferno (Interlude)" (featuring Roshelle)	Martorana; Rossella Discolo	Scalabrin; Lombroni Capalbo; Diego Frabetti	Shablo	3:12
9.	"Sopra le canzoni" (featuring Dardust)	Martorana; Filippo Uttinacci	Faini	Dardust	3:14
10.	"10 ragazze" (featuring Ernia)	Martorana; Matteo Professione	Simone Benussi	MACE; Swan	2:54
11.	"Mare che non sei" (featuring Gaia)	Martorana; Gaia Gozzi	Faraone; Lombroni Capalbo; Simone Privitera	Simon Says!; Shablo	2:40
12.	"Solo con me" (featuring Tommy Dali)	Martorana; Tommaso Daliana	Gioele Accongiagioco; Fabrizio Martini; David Orobosa Omoregie	Marquis; Dave	2:26
13.	"Cancelli di mezzanotte" (featuring Chiello)	Martorana; Rocco Modello	Faraone; Lombroni Capalbo	Shablo	3:33
14.	"Taxi Driver"	Martorana	Faraone; Lombroni Capalbo	Shablo; Faraone	2:48
Total length:					41:03

Taxi Driver+ – Deluxe edition bonus tracks
No.	Title	Lyrics	Music	Producers	Length
1.	"Intro (ultima curva)"	Martorana	Spinelli	Rkomi	1:08
2.	"Insuperabile"	Martorana; Alessandro La Cava	Martorana; La Cava; Catitti	Katoo	2:52
3.	"La coda del diavolo" (featuring Elodie)	Martorana; Davide Petrella	Martorana; Alessandro Pulga; Stefano Tognini	Marz; Zef	3:08
4.	"Maleducata" (featuring Dargen D'Amico)	Martorana; Jacopo Matteo Luca D'Amico; Faraone	Diego Vincenzo Vettraino	Drillionaire	2:45
5.	"Ho paura di te" (featuring Karakaz)	Martorana; Michele Corvino	Catitti	Katoo; Karakaz	3:32
6.	"Fegato, fegato spappolato" (featuring Calibro 35)	Vasco Rossi; Alan Taylor	Rossi	Luca Cavina; Tommaso Colliva; Enrico Gabrielli; Massimo Martellotta; Fabio Rondanini	3:13
7.	"Autobus di notte"	Martorana	Odoguardi	Junior K	2:40
8.	"Amico dove sei?"	Martorana	Odoguardi	Junior K	2:13
9.	"Ossa rotte"	Petrella	Michele Zocca	Michelangelo	3:25
Total length:					41:03

== Charts ==
=== Weekly charts ===
Weekly chart performance for Taxi Driver
Chart (2021)	Peak position
Italian Albums (FIMI)	1
Swiss Albums (Schweizer Hitparade)	31

=== Year-end charts ===
Year-end chart performance for Taxi Driver
Chart	Year	Position
Italian Albums (FIMI)	2021	1
Italian Albums (FIMI)	2022	2
Italian Albums (FIMI)	2023	21
Italian Albums (FIMI)	2024	52

== Certifications ==
Certifications for Taxi Driver
Region	Certification	Certified units/sales
Italy (FIMI)	9× Platinum	450,000^{‡}
^{‡} Sales+streaming figures based on certification alone.
