= Lidia Vitale =

Italian actress

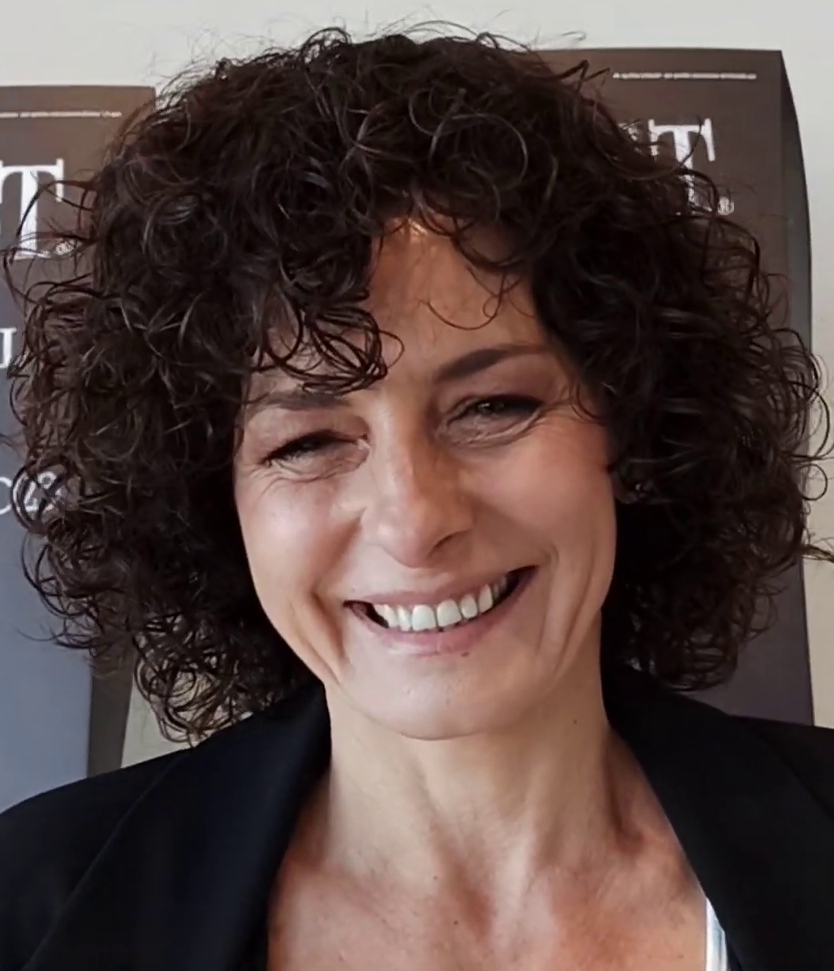
- Vitale at the 2023 Bari International Film Festival
- Born: 12 October 1972 (age 53); Rome, Italy
- Occupation: Actress
- Years active: 2000-present

Lidia Vitale (born 12 October 1972) is an Italian actress. She appeared in more than fifty films since 2000.

== Filmography ==
=== Films ===
Year	Title	Role(s)	Notes
2003	The Best of Youth	Giovanna Carati	
2005	Cose da pazzi	Francesca Cocuzza	
2006	Along the Ridge	Livia	
2007	Una notte	Girl at party	Uncredited
2007	Two Families	Agnese	
2007	Senza amore	Rita	
2009	The Double Hour	Readhead at date	Cameo appearance
2009	Giulia Doesn't Date at Night	Female agent	Cameo appearance
2010	Love & Slaps	Delfina Margheriti	
2011	5 (Cinque)	Vanessa	
2013	La santa	Silvia	
2013	Tutti contro tutti	Romana	
2014	The Dinner	Giovanna Renzi	
2015	Suburra	Malgradi's wife	
2015	Arianna	Gynaecologist	Cameo appearance
2016	Era d'estate	Liliana Ferraro	
2016	Slam: Tutto per una ragazza	Sam's grandma	
2017	Tulipani, Love, Honour and a Bicycle	Immacolata	
2017	Actus reus	Evelina	Short film
2017	The Startup	Mrs. Achilli	
2018	Virginia	Virginia	Short film
2018	Niente di serio	Giovanna	
2018	Restiamo amici	Anna	
2018	Piccole avventure romane	The woman	Short film
2018	La banalità del crimine	Alessia	
2019	The Match	Roberta	
2020	L'abbraccio - Storia di Antonino e Stefano Saetta	Herself	Documentary
2021	The Grand Bolero	Roxanne	
2022	Ghiaccio	Maria	
2022	Burning Hearts	Teresa Malatesta	
2023	The First Day of My Life	Daniele's mother	
2024	Mascarpone: The Rainbow Cake	Gaia Trevis	

=== Television ===
Year	Title	Role(s)	Notes
2000	Il furto del tesoro	Nina	Television film
2003	Salvo D'Acquisto	Biagio's wife	Television film
2004	Vita a perdere	Lucia	Television film
2004	Diritto di difesa	Adele Brenna	10 episodes
2004	Don Matteo	Lucia Arnaldi	Episode: "Merce preziosa"
2004	Posso chiamarti amore?	Maria Elena Rondinelli	Television film
2004–2005	Incantesimo	Claudia Viola	13 episodes
2005	La caccia	Giulia	Television film
2005	Una famiglia in giallo	Mirella Bilenchi	Episode: "Morte di un artista"
2007	Senza via d'uscita	Francesca Trevisan	Television film
2007	RIS: Delitti Imperfetti	Michela Torre	Episode: "Il sangue non mente"
2007–2010	Medicina generale	Marzia Gullotta	28 episodes
2008	Una madre	Police officer	Television film
2009	I liceali	Emilia Morucci	4 episodes
2012	L'amore proibito	Inspector Spina	Television film
2013	Tutta la musica del cuore	Benedetta	5 episodes
2014	Per amore del mio popolo	Assunta Esposito	2 episodes
2016	Baciato dal sole	Stella Lamberti	5 episodes
2017	Thou Shalt Not Kill	Alessia	Episode: "Episodio 1"
2018	Liberi sognatori	Enza Sabotino	Episode: "Delitto di Mafia: Paolo Francese"
2018	Una pallottola nel cuore	Sonia	Episode: "La notte degli errori"
2019	Rosy Abate	Anna	3 episodes
2019	Romolo + Giuly	Anna Montacchi	10 episodes
2019	Medici	Beggar woman	2 episodes
2021	Luna Park	Daria Dominici	4 episodes
2021	Leonardo	The Hag	Episode: "Episode 2"
2023	Drops of God	Elisabetta Fossati	2 episodes
2025	Mrs Playmen	Lella	7 Episodes Netflix series
