= Burning Hearts =

2022 Italian crime-drama film by Pippo Mezzapesa

- Directed by: Pippo Mezzapesa
- Screenplay by: Pippo Mezzapesa; Antonella Gaeta; Davide Serino
- Starring: Elodie; Francesco Patanè; Lidia Vitale; Francesco Di Leva; Giovanni Trombetta; Letizia Pia Cartolaro; Michele Pereira Da Paz; Giovanni Anzaldo; Brenno Placido; Tommaso Ragno; Michele Placido
- Cinematography: Michele D'Attanasio
- Music by: Teho Teardo
- Distributed by: 01 Distribution
- Release date: 2022
- Language: Italian

Burning Hearts (Italian: Ti mangio il cuore, lit. 'I'll eat your heart') is a 2022 Italian drama film written and directed by Pippo Mezzapesa. The film premiered at the Horizons section of the 79th edition of the Venice Film Festival. It is based on a non-fiction book by Carlo Bonini and Giuliano Foschini and inspired by the true story of Rosa Di Fiore, the first pentita (informant) of the Gargano Mafia. It marked the acting debut of singer Elodie.

== Plot ==
In the Gargano promontory live two families belonging to the Apulian mafia, the Malatesta and the Camporeale, who vie for control of the territory. The two families have had bloody disputes over the years, including the massacre of the family of Michele Malatesta in 1960, which deeply marked the clan. More than forty years later, the two families seem to have established a truce, favored by a third family, the Montanari.

In this period of apparent calm Andrea, Michele Malatesta's favorite son and heir to the clan, falls in love with Marilena, wife of the boss Santo Camporeale, who is currently on the run. Marilena in turn falls in love with Andrea but, aware of being married and of the rivalry between the two families, only apparently dormant, she decides to see him only clandestinely. Michele makes his son promise to end this dangerous relationship, but the promise is not kept. The relationship soon becomes public knowledge and the two lovers are forced to flee, but the Camporeales take their revenge by killing Michele and so the two families, despite Don Vincenzo Montanari's attempts at mediation, return to war.

To pay homage to his father killed by the rival clan, Andrea is forced to return home together with Marilena who, driven out of the Camporeales for her betrayal and a prisoner in the Malatesta house, is carrying a child and collides with a harsh and bloody reality. Andrea, spurred on by his widowed mother to avenge the murder of the head of the family, is increasingly obsessed with eliminating every member of the rival family.

== Cast ==
- Elodie as Marilena Camporeale
- Francesco Patanè as Andrea Malatesta
- Lidia Vitale as Teresa Malatesta
- Francesco Di Leva as Giovannangelo
- Giovanni Trombetta as Paky Malatesta
- Giovanni Anzaldo as Zigo Zago
- Brenno Placido as Potito Montanari
- Tommaso Ragno as Michele Malatesta
- Michele Placido as Vincenzo Montanari

== Reception ==
The film was generally praised by critics. For her performance Elodie was awarded the Ciak d'Oro as revelation of the year.

== Accolades ==
Year	Award	Category	Recipient(s)	Result
2022	Venice Film Festival - Horizon Award	Best Feature Film	Burning Hearts	Nominated
2022	Rome Film Festival Award	Women in Cinema Award	Elodie	Won
2022	Ciak d'Oro	Acting Revelation of the Year	Elodie	Won
2022	Ciak d'Oro	Best Drama Film	Burning Hearts	Nominated
2023	Bif&st Award	Best Breakthrough Actress	Elodie	Won
2023	Bif&st Award	Best Supporting Actress	Lidia Vitale	Won
2023	David di Donatello	Best Original Song	"Proiettili (ti mangio il cuore)" (Elisa Toffoli, Joan Thiele and Emanuele Triglia as songwriters, Elodie and Joan Thiele as performers)	Won
2023	Nastro d'argento	Best Supporting Actress	Lidia Vitale	Nominated
2023	Nastro d'argento	Best Cinematography	Michele D'Attanasio	Won
2023	Nastro d'argento	Best Original Song	"Proiettili (ti mangio il cuore)" (Elisa Toffoli, Joan Thiele and Emanuele Triglia as songwriters, Elodie and Joan Thiele as performers)	Nominated

== See also ==
- Gargano conflict
