= OK. Respira (song) =

Single by Elodie

from the album OK. Respira
- Released: 9 December 2022
- Genre: Dance pop
- Length: 2:41
- Label: Island
- Songwriters: Elodie Di Patrizi; Joan Thiele; Federica Abbate; Jacopo Ettorre; Leonardo Grillotti; Federico Mercuri; Giordano Cremona; Eugenio Maimone
- Producer: ITACA

Elodie singles chronology
"Proiettili (ti mangio il cuore)" (2022)	"OK. Respira" (2022)	"Due" (2023)

Music video
- "OK. Respira" on YouTube

"OK. Respira" (transl. "OK. Breathe") is a song co-written and recorded by Italian singer Elodie. It was released by Island Records on 9 December 2022 as the fifth single from the singer's fourth studio album by the same name.

It was written by Elodie, Joan Thiele, Federica Abbate, Jacopo Ettorre and composed by Leonardo Grillotti, Federico Mercuri, Giordano Cremona and Eugenio Maimone, and produced by the collective ITACA. It peaked at 45 on the Italian singles' chart and was certified gold.

== Music video ==
The music video for the song, directed by Giampaolo Sgura, was released on YouTube on the same day.

== Charts ==
Weekly chart performance for "OK. Respira"
Chart (2022)	Peak position
Italy (FIMI)	45
Italy Airplay (EarOne)	1

== Certifications ==
Region	Certification	Certified units/sales
Italy (FIMI)	Gold	50,000^{‡}
^{‡} Sales+streaming figures based on certification alone.
