= Pazza musica =

Single by Marco Mengoni and Elodie

from the album Materia (Prisma) and OK. Respira (digital edition only)
- Language: Italian
- Released: 26 May 2023
- Recorded: 2023
- Genre: Funk; jazz; R&B
- Length: 3:15
- Label: Sony Music
- Songwriters: Paolo Antonacci; Davide Petrella; Davide Simonetta; Stefano Tognini
- Producers: E.D.D.; Davide Simonetta; Zef

Marco Mengoni singles chronology
"Due vite" (2023)	"Pazza musica" (2023)	"Un'altra storia" (2023)

Elodie singles chronology
"Due" (2023)	"Pazza musica" (2023)	"A fari spenti" (2023)

Music video
- "Pazza musica" on YouTube

"Pazza musica" ("Mad Music") is a song recorded by Italian singers Marco Mengoni and Elodie. It was released on 26 May 2023 by Sony Music as the second single from Mengoni's eighth studio album Materia (Prisma).

It peaked at number ten of the Italian singles chart, becoming Mengoni's 18th and Elodie's 7th top-ten song. Subsequently, "Pazza Musica" has been included to the digital reissue of Elodie's fourth studio album OK. Respira.

== Background and composition ==
"Pazza musica", written by Paolo Antonacci, Davide Petrella, Davide Simonetta and Stefano Tognini, is the first collaboration between Marco Mengoni and Elodie. In an interview for TV Sorrisi e Canzoni, Mengoni explained the meaning of the song and the decision to collaborate among the two artists:

"We had been planning to do something with Elodie for a long time, and going into summer, we chose a song with sounds that are a little bit against the grain compared to the "Latin-sounding" songs we usually hear during the season. It is a wish for ourselves, because we are quite similar in character, to be able to gloss over our fears and constant anxiety of life through our greatest passion."

== Critical reception ==
Mattia Marzi of Rockol wrote that although the song has been denigrated by the two singers as an "anti-summer catchphrase," it "won't wink at Latin rhythms, [...] but it has the right characteristics to become one." This is according to Marzi thanks to "a catchy woodwind riff" and that "the repartee between Marco Mengoni and Elodie, [...] works. The song is a hymn to the saving power of pop music." Alessandro Alicandri of TV Sorrisi e Canzoni described Pazza musica as "a warm and engaging song" in which "you can breathe the humanity of those who sing it." The journalist also stated that the song "tells their story in a way that is not even too subtle," united by "careers that did not start off immediately with a bang, they are two 'artistically shy' people who have had to make room for themselves over the years."

== Music video ==
A music video to accompany the release of the song was first distributed on YouTube on May 26, 2023. It is directed by Roberto Ortu and filmed by Francesco Piras. The video shows a diverse group of people having a 2000s style block party.

== Live performances ==
Mengoni debuted the song live as the musical guest on Che tempo che fa.

== Charts ==
=== Weekly charts ===
Weekly chart performance for "Pazza musica"
Chart (2023)	Peak position
Italy (FIMI)	10

=== Year-end charts ===
Year-end chart performance for "Pazza musica"
Chart (2023)	Position
Italy (FIMI)	36

== Certifications ==
Certifications for "Pazza musica"
Region	Certification	Certified units/sales
Italy (FIMI)	3× Platinum	300,000^{‡}
^{‡} Sales+streaming figures based on certification alone.
