= Un'altra vita (song) =

Single by Elodie

from the album Un'altra vita
- Released: 13 May 2016
- Recorded: 2016
- Length: 2:58
- Label: Universal
- Songwriters: Fabrizio Moro; Roberto Cardelli
- Producers: Luca Mattioni; Emma

Elodie singles chronology
| "Un'altra vita" (2016) | "Amore avrai" (2016) |

Music video
- "Un'altra vita" on YouTube

"Un'altra vita" (lit. 'Another life') is the debut single by Italian singer Elodie. It was released by Universal Music on 13 May 2016 as the lead single from her debut studio album by the same name.

The song was written by Fabrizio Moro and Roberto Cardelli, and produced by Emma Marrone and Luca Mattioni.

== Charts ==
Weekly chart performance for "Un'altra vita"
| Chart (2016) | Peak position |
|---|---|
| Italy (FIMI) | 33 |
| Italy Airplay (EarOne) | 56 |

== Certifications ==
| Region | Certification | Certified units/sales |
|---|---|---|
| Italy (FIMI) | Gold | 25,000^{‡} |
^{‡} Sales+streaming figures based on certification alone.
