= La coda del diavolo (song) =

2021 single by Rkomi ft. Elodie

Single by Rkomi featuring Elodie

from the album Taxi Driver +
- Language: Italian
- Released: 21 December 2021
- Genre: Dance pop
- Length: 3:08
- Label: Island
- Songwriters: Mirko Martorana; Davide Petrella; Dario Faini
- Producers: Marz; Zef

Rkomi singles chronology
"Luna piena" (2021)	"La coda del diavolo" (2021)	"Insuperabile" (2022)

Elodie singles chronology
"Vertigine" (2021)	"La coda del diavolo" (2021)	"Bagno a mezzanotte" (2022)

Music video
- "La coda del diavolo" on YouTube

"La coda del diavolo" (lit. 'The devil's tail') is a song by Italian singer-songwriter and rapper Rkomi with featured vocals by Italian singer Elodie. The song was written by Rkomi, Davide Petrella and Dardust. It was included in the digital edition of the album Taxi Driver, and later in the 2022 re-issue Taxi Driver +. In February 2022, it was released in vinyl, as B-side of Rkomi's Sanremo Music Festival 2022 entry "Insuperabile".

== Charts ==
=== Weekly charts ===
Chart (2022)	Peak position
Italy (FIMI)	1
Italy Airplay (EarOne)	4
San Marino (SMRRTV Top 50)	11

=== Year-end charts ===
Chart (2022)	Peak position
Italy (FIMI)	5

== Certifications ==
Region	Certification	Certified units/sales
Italy (FIMI)	6× Platinum	600,000^{‡}
^{‡} Sales+streaming figures based on certification alone.
