= Tutta colpa mia (song) =

Single by Elodie

from the album Tutta colpa mia
- Released: 8 February 2017
- Genre: Pop rock
- Length: 3:18
- Label: Universal
- Songwriters: Emma Marrone; Oscar Angiuli; Francesco Cianciola; Giovanni Pollex
- Producers: Emma; Luca Mattioni

Elodie singles chronology
"L'imperfezione della vita" (2016)	"Tutta colpa mia" (2017)	"Verrà da sé" (2017)

Music video
- "Tutta colpa mia" on YouTube

"Tutta colpa mia" is a song recorded by Italian singer Elodie. It was released by Universal Music on 8 February 2017 as the lead single from her second studio album Tutta colpa mia.

It was written by Emma Marrone, Oscar Angiuli, Francesco Cianciola, Giovanni Pollex, and produced by Marrone and Luca Mattioni. The song served as the artist's entry for the Sanremo Music Festival 2017, the 67th edition of Italy's musical festival which doubled also as a selection of the act for the Eurovision Song Contest.

== Music video ==
The music video for the song, directed by Gaetano Morbioli, was released on YouTube on 10 February 2017.

== Charts ==
Weekly chart performance for "Tutta colpa mia"
Chart (2017)	Peak position
Italy (FIMI)	12
Italy Airplay (EarOne)	23

== Certifications ==
Region	Certification	Certified units/sales
Italy (FIMI)	Platinum	50,000^{‡}
^{‡} Sales+streaming figures based on certification alone.
