= Elodie (singer) =

Italian singer-songwriter and actress (born 1990)

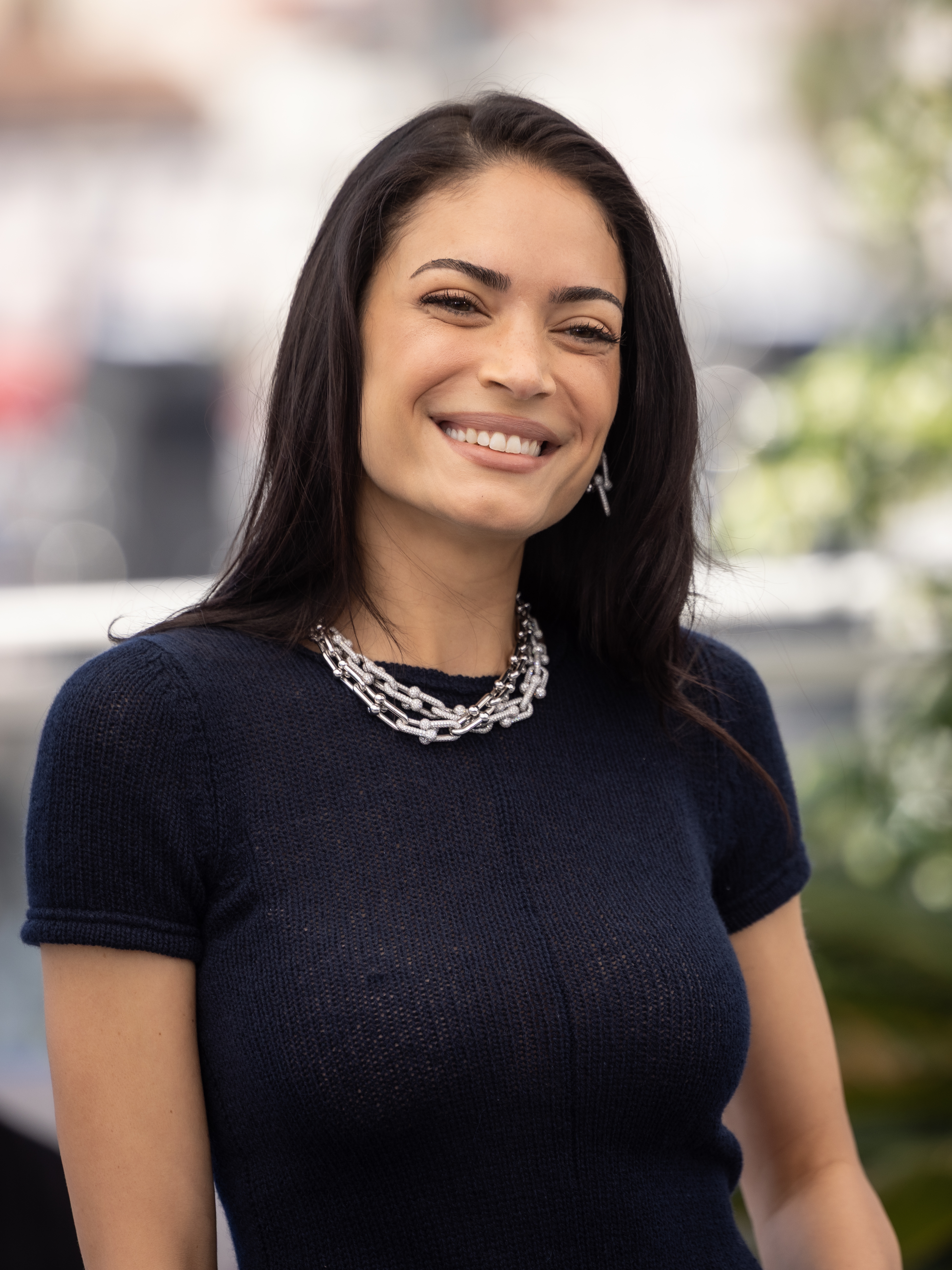
- Elodie at the 2025 Cannes Film Festival

Background information
- Born: Elodie Di Patrizi; 3 May 1990 (age 36); Rome, Lazio, Italy
- Genres: Pop; R&B
- Occupations: Singer; songwriter; actress
- Works: Discography
- Years active: 2016–present
- Labels: Island; Universal
- Partner: Françeska Nuredini (2026–present)
- Website: www.elodieofficial.it

Elodie Di Patrizi (born 3 May 1990), known professionally as simply Elodie (Italian: [eloˈdi]), is an Italian singer-songwriter and actress. She first rose to prominence as the runner-up of the fifteenth edition of the show Amici di Maria De Filippi (2015–2016).

Since 2015, she has released five studio albums, each of which entered the top ten of the Italian albums chart, as well as numerous successful singles. She has collaborated with Italian artists such as Emma, Elisa, Giorgia, Roshelle, Michele Bravi, Guè, Fabri Fibra, Mahmood, The Kolors, Rkomi and Marracash. She has sold over four million copies in Italy, as certified by FIMI, and earned three MTV Europe Music Award for Best Italian Act nomination. She has also participated at the Sanremo Music Festival four times with "Tutta colpa mia" (2017), "Andromeda" (2020), "Due" (2023) and "Dimenticarsi alle 7" (2025).

In 2022, Elodie made her acting debut, in the leading role of the Italian drama film Burning Hearts, which premiered at the 79th Venice International Film Festival, winning a number of awards, including a Bif&st Award and the WiCa at Rome Film Festival. She also performed the original song "Proiettili (ti mangio il cuore)", winner of the David di Donatello award for Best Original Song.

Throughout her career, Elodie has also been the face of numerous fashion and beauty brands, including Versace, Sephora, Puma, Lancome, Levi's, Calvin Klein, Bulgari and Valentino. In 2023, Forbes Italia listed Elodie amongst "the 100 successful women in Italy" of the year. Over the course of her career, she has released numerous successful singles such as "Guaranà", "Bagno a mezzanotte", "Tribale" and "OK. Respira".

== Biography and career ==
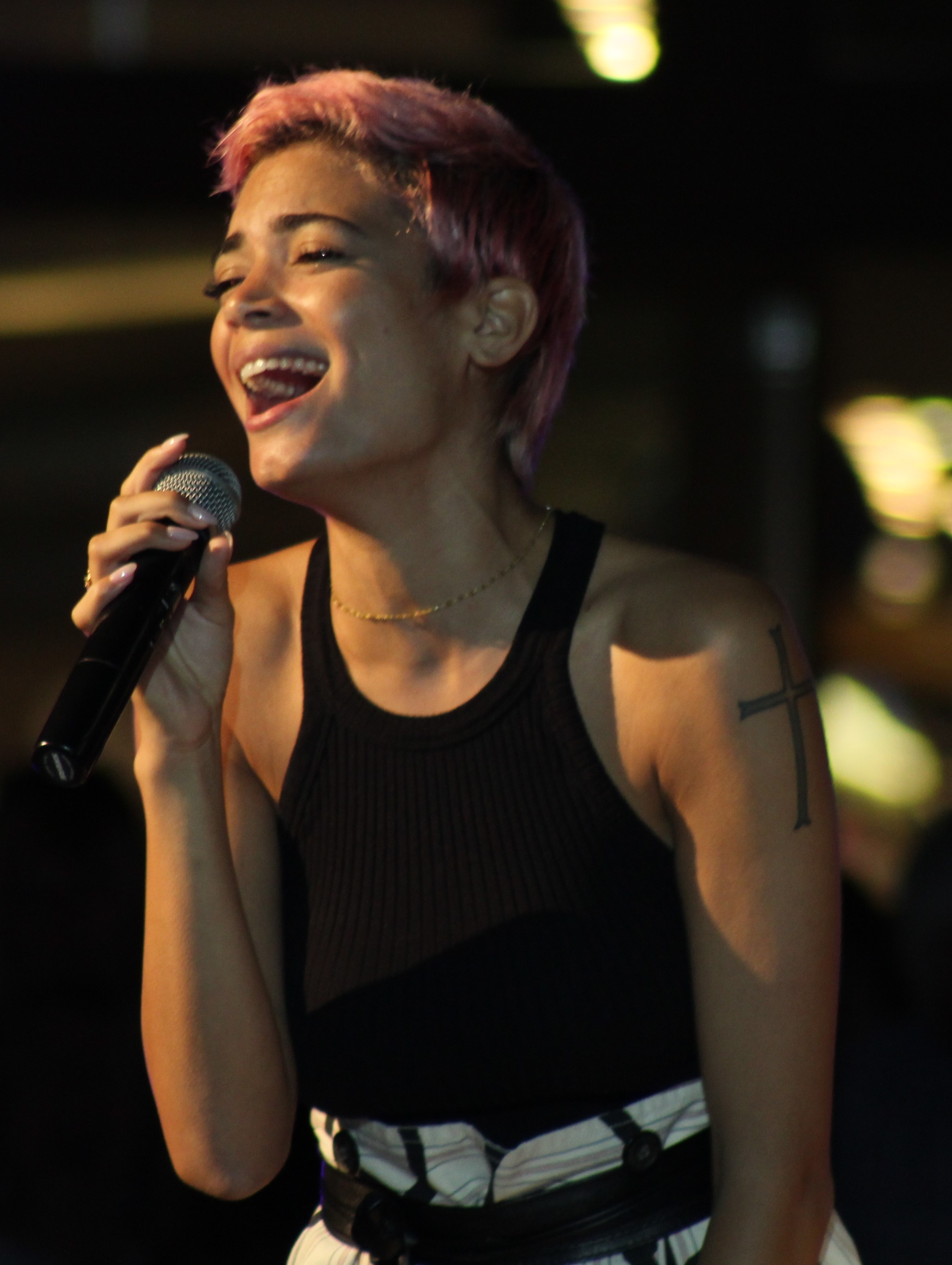
Elodie performing in 2017

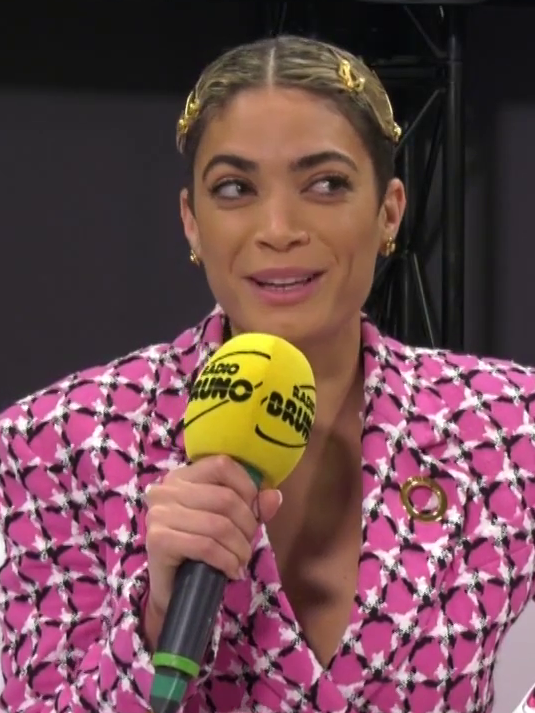
Elodie at the Sanremo Music Festival 2020

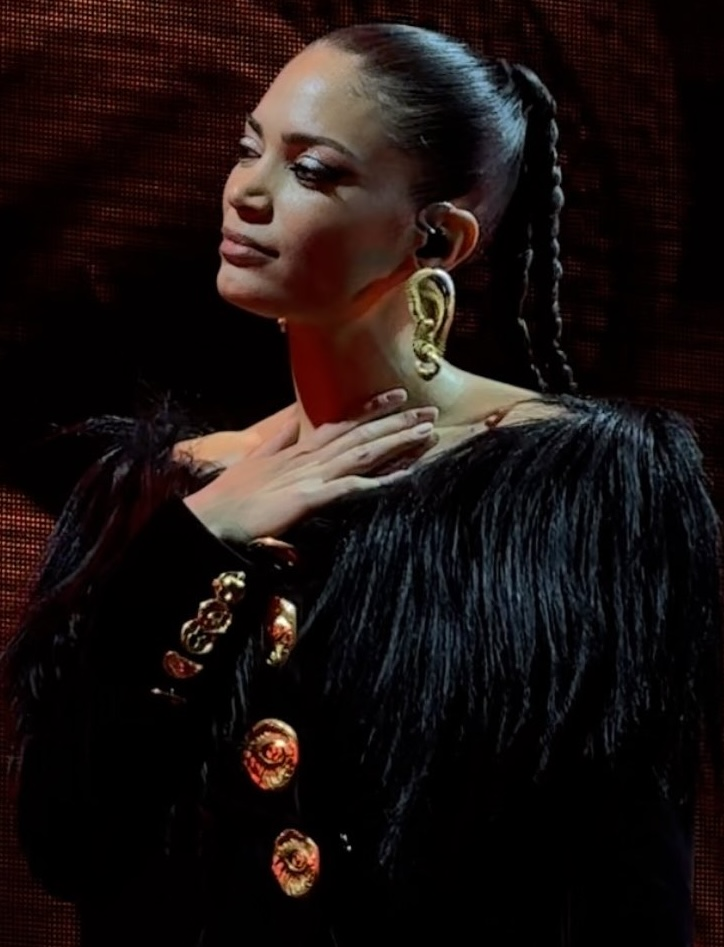
Elodie performing in 2023

Elodie was born on 3 May 1990 in Rome, Italy. She's the daughter of Roberto Di Patrizi, a street artist, and Claudia Marthe, a former model and go-go dancer. Elodie is of French-Black Creole descent from Guadeloupe. She has a younger sister, Fey Di Patrizi. In 2008, at age of 18, Elodie auditioned during the casting session of the first season of X Factor, being subsequently eliminated during the early stages of the competition.

=== 2015–2017: Career beginnings with Amici di Maria De Filippi ===
In 2015, she competed in the fifteenth edition of Italian talent competition series Amici di Maria De Filippi, and was selected as part of the white team, coached by Emma Marrone and Elisa, placing second in the final, behind Sergio Sylvestre. Shortly after the end of the show, Elodie signed with Universal Music Italy and released her debut single "Un'altra vita". The song peaked within the Top 40 in Italy, and was certified gold. The single was followed by her debut studio album, also titled Un'altra vita, which peaked at number two in Italy. The record was produced by Luca Mattioni and her former Amici's coach Emma Marrone. To promote the album, the song "Amore avrai" was released as the second single. The song was nominated as "Song of the Summer" at Radio 105 Summer Festival. From September to November 2016, Elodie served as an opening act during the Adesso Tour by Emma Marrone and was featured in the benefit concert special Amiche in Arena, organized by Loredana Bertè and Fiorella Mannoia.

In February 2017, Elodie was announced among the competitors of the 67th Sanremo Music Festival, with the song "Tutta colpa mia", written by Emma Marrone and Oscar Angiuli. The song placed 8th during the final rank and peaked at number 12 on the Italian Singles Chart, being certified platinum. In the same month, the singer released her second studio album, Tutta colpa mia, on 17 February 2017. The album peaked at number six on FIMI's Chart, marking her second consecutive top 10 album. In April, the singer appeared as herself in the film Non c'è campo, directed by Federico Moccia, for which she also contributed to the soundtrack with the song "Semplice", featured on her album Tutta colpa mia. From May to June 2017, Elodie was featured as a special guest during the Scriverò il tuo nome Tour by Francesco Renga. The two artists performed their collaboration "Così diversa" from Renga's first live album Scriverò il tuo nome Live.

=== 2018–2019: Successful singles and collaborations ===
In May 2018, Elodie released the single "Nero Bali", a collaboration with singer Michele Bravi and rapper Guè as the lead single from her upcoming studio project. The song received widespread success, becoming the singer's first to reach the top ten of the Italian Singles Chart, at number 10. The song was promoted during the sixth edition of Radio 105 Summer Festival. Subsequently, it was certified double platinum. In October 2018 Elodie released the single "Rambla", featuring Italian rapper Ghemon.

On 15 March 2019, Elodie collaborated with Italian pop band The Kolors for the single "Pensare male". Within two weeks, it reached the top 10 of the Italian Airplay Chart and for three consecutive weeks it was the most played song on radio, the first time for both artists. The song was certified platinum in Italy. In June 2019, the collaborative single "Margarita" with Italian rapper Marracash was released. The song became one of the most successful songs of the summer in Italy, receiving three platinum certifications and peaking at number six on the Italian Singles Chart and number one on the Italian Airplay Chart. In September 2019, Elodie served as a member of the jury of the Castrocaro Music Festival, which aired on Rai 2, hosted by Stefano De Martino and Belén Rodríguez. The following month, Elodie was featured in a re-recorded version of Myss Keta's 2015 single "Le ragazze di Porta Venezia", subtitled "The Manifesto", with vocals by La Pina, Joan Thiele, Roshelle and Priestess, included in the rapper's second studio album Paprika.

=== 2020–2021: This Is Elodie ===
In January 2020, it was announced that Elodie would compete during the 70th Sanremo Music Festival with the song "Andromeda", written by Mahmood and produced by Dardust. The song debuted at number 35 after only two days on streaming music services and placed 7th at the end of the competition. On 7 January 2020, the singer announced her third studio album This Is Elodie, which was released on streaming music services on 31 January 2020, and on physical edition on 7 February 2020 by Island Records. The album, described as pop record, contained elements from hip hop, soul, funk and reggae and collaborations with Guè, Marracash, Ernia, Gemitaiz, Margherita Vicario, Michele Bravi, Fabri Fibra, Lazza, Ghemon and The Kolors, as well as Madame in the streaming edition. The album debuted at number seven on the Italian Albums Chart. The week following the Sanremo Festival, both the album and the competing song "Andromeda" reached the sixth position of the relative FIMI charts.

On 13 May 2020, Elodie released the single "Guaranà", included in the digital re-issue of This Is Elodie, which was certified double platinum by FIMI for sales exceeding 140,000 copies. The following month she appeared as a featured artist on Takagi & Ketra's song "Ciclone", with Gipsy Kings and Mariah Angeliq, which became her fourth top 10 hit on FIMI's singles chart. In October 2020, Elodie was featured on Carl Brave's single "Parli parli", included in the rapper's second studio album Coraggio.

On 30 December 2020, it was announced that Elodie would co-host the second night of the 71st Sanremo Music Festival alongside Amadeus and Fiorello. During the event, the singer performed a medley of her greatest success remixed with worldwide hits by Beyoncé, Raffaella Carrà and Madonna. In January 2021, Elodie was cast on the second season of Amazon Prime Video reality competition show Celebrity Hunted Italia, which she won, coupled with fellow musician Myss Keta.

=== 2021–2023: OK. Respira, first arena tour and acting debut ===
In September 2021, Elodie released the song "Vertigine", as the lead single from her then upcoming fourth studio album, set for release in 2022. The song, an electropop ballad, was written by Elisa and peaked at number 40 on the Italian Singles Chart. On 5 October 2021, the singer appeared as a co-host during the season premiere of the twenty-fifth season of Le Iene. On 3 December 2021, Elodie collaborated with Italian rapper Rkomi on "La coda del diavolo", which topped the Italian singles chart and received five platinum certifications for sales exceeding 500,000 copies in Italy, marking the first number one single for Elodie.

On 3 March 2022, Elodie released "Bagno a mezzanotte" as the second single from her upcoming fourth studio album, which reached number 4 on the Italian Singles Chart. All proceeds from the single were donated to Save the Children to help refugees from the Russian invasion of Ukraine. On 10 June 2022, "Tribale" was released as the third single from the album. The song, which reached number 13 on the Italian Singles Chart, marks the first official release in which Elodie provides songwriting credits.

In August 2022, it was announced that the singer would make her acting debut in the Italian film Burning Hearts, directed by Pippo Mezzapesa. The film premiered in the Orizzonti section of the 79th Venice International Film Festival on 3 September 2022. In the film, the singer played Marilena Camporeale, a pentita of the Gargano Mafia, which is based on a non-fiction book by Carlo Bonini and Giuliano Foschini and inspired by the true story of Rosa Di Fiore. Elodie's performance was met with critical acclaim which earned her a Ciak d'oro as "Revelation of the Year", a special award as "Best Breakthrough Performance" at Bari International Film Festival and a "Women in Cinema Award" at Rome Film Festival. Elodie also co-wrote and performed the original soundtrack of the film "Proiettili (ti mangio il cuore)" with Joan Thiele. The song won the David di Donatello for Best Original Song as well as being nominated for a Nastro d'Argento as Best Original Song.

On 4 December 2022, it was announced that Elodie would compete during the Sanremo Music Festival 2023. The song "Due" was later announced as her entry for the Sanremo Music Festival 2023. On 9 December 2022, the single "OK. Respira" was released ahead of her upcoming album of the same name, which was released on 10 February 2023. The album marked the singer's artistic development, combining club-pop, R&B and electronic music. OK. Respira peaked at number four of the Italian Albums Chart and became the first project by a female Italian artist to be certified platinum in 2023 by FIMI. On 12 May 2023 Elodie performed at her first headlining arena show at Mediolanium Forum in Milan, which anticipated her first arena tour, called Elodie Show 2023, starting the following November.

On 26 May 2023, Elodie released "Pazza musica", a collaboration with Marco Mengoni, which was included as a bonus track on OK. Respira and as well as released as the second single from Mengoni's eighth studio album Materia (Prisma). On 22 September 2023, she released the song "A fari spenti" as the lead single from the mixtape Red Light. The project was released as a surprise album without prior announcement. Its cover was drawn by Milo Manara. The record marked a departure from the singer's previous R&B and urban-influenced releases in favour of house, EDM and techno influences. The proceeds were donated to the RED association, created by Bono to fund health programs for women in Sub-Saharan Africa. In November 2023, Elodie collaborated with Italian rapper Sfera Ebbasta for the song "Anche stasera", which served as the lead single from the rapper's fourth studio album X2VR.

=== 2024–present: Mi ami mi odi and first stadium show ===
On 31 May 2024 Elodie released "Black Nirvana" as the lead single from her then upcoming fifth studio record. The song peaked at number 7 on the Italian Singles Chart and was certified platinum. During the summer, it was revealed that the singer will be featured on the new edition of the Pirelli calendar. In September, Elodie appeared as a featured artist in a remixed version of Ornella Vanoni's song "Ti voglio", re-recorded with Vanoni and Ditonellapiaga, included on the album Diverse. On 8 November 2024, Elodie collaborated with Italian singer Tiziano Ferro for the duet "Feeling", released as the second official single from her upcoming fifth studio album.

The following month, she was announced among the competitors of the 75th Sanremo Music Festival, where she placed 12th with the song "Dimenticarsi alle 7". The song peaked at number 7 on the Italian Singles Chart and was certified gold. On 4 April 2025, Elodie released the song "Mi ami mi odi", which anticipated her fifth studio album by the same name, released the following month. The record, a pop, electropop and R&B record, peaked at number 3 on the Italian Albums Chart and was certified platinum. To promote the record, the singer embarked her first stadium tour, called The Stadium Show, which consisted in a two-dates event at San Siro Stadium in Milan and Diego Armando Maradona Stadium in Naples. The two shows anticipated the following Elodie Show 2025, the second arena tour of the singer.

In the same year, Elodie was cast as Giada Costanzi in the thriller film Gioco pericoloso and as Barbara in the biographical drama film Fuori, directed by Mario Martone and based on 1983 novel L'università di Rebibbia by Goliarda Sapienza. For her role in Fuori, Elodie won her first Nastro d'Argento for Best Supporting Actress.

In August 2025, Elodie was featured on Irama's fifth studio album Antologia della vita e della morte on the track "Ex".

== Personal life ==
Prior to joining Amici di Maria De Filippi, Elodie was engaged to DJ and producer Andrea Maggino. During her participation on the show Amici she met the singer Lele. The two began a relationship in June 2016, which ended two years later.

In the summer of 2019, after the release of the hit "Margarita", she started a relationship with the Italian rapper Marracash. The couple split up in the winter of 2021.

In April 2026, Elodie revealed that she is in a relationship with Albanian dancer Françeska Nuredini.

== Modelling career ==
- Advisor for Urban Decay Cosmetics (2017)
- Model for Italian clothes brand Pinko (2018–2019)
- Model for Italian clothes brand Niclao (2019)
- Advisor for Moët & Chandon (2019)
- Advisor of Christmas' campaign of Brosway jewels (2019)
- Model and creative designer for Italian line by Puma (2019–present)
- Model for underwater Italian brand Yamamay (2019–2021)
- New face for Italian campaign fragrance by Calvin Klein(2019)
- Advisor for Schwarzkopf Heads (2020)
- Advisor for Lancome Cosmetics (2020)
- Face of the charity Christmas campaign by OVS for Save the Children (2020)
- Advisor and creator of a capsule collection for Sephora (2021–present)
- Advisor and television testimonial for Oppo (2021–present)
- Advisor and model for H&M (2021–present)
- Advisor and model for Versace (2021)
- Advisor and model for Bulgari (2021–present)
- Advisor and model for Levi's (2022)
- Advisor for YSL Beauty (2022–present)
- Advisor for JImmy Choo x Mugler (2022)
- Advisor and television testimonial for Wella Professionals (2022–present)
- Advisor for Tiffany & Co. (2023)
- Advisor and television testimonial for Lavazza (2023)
- Advisor for Durex (2023)
- Advisor for Valentino Beauty (2023)
- Advisor for Valentino's perfume "Born in Roma" (2023)

== Music style and influences ==
In an interview on Fanpage.it Elodie affirms "I'm a girl born in a low-income housing project, that's why rap, naked and raw, is a good representation of where I grew up, and I like that." and cites young Italian rappers beba, Chadia and Madame as examples of "women of my generation who are not afraid to show this side. We are fierce." In an interview with Rolling Stone Italy, Elodie speaks about her influences: Etta James, Raf, Kaytranada, Nina Simone, Beyoncé and Italian singers Giorgia, Mina and Lucio Battisti. She also cities Amici's coaches Emma Marrone and Elisa. Her music is inspired by pop, R&B, rap, reggae, and urban music.

== Activism ==
Elodie is an activist and supporter for the LGBT rights in Italy, often siding against the right-wing party Lega Nord, regarding the campaign to pass the Italian anti-homophobia law. Following a speech given by Giorgia Meloni, leader of the national-conservative party Brothers of Italy (FdI), at the 2022 convention of the Spanish party Vox, Elodie said when interviewed by Peter Gomez Homen: "It's not up to you, you're not God, you don't even come close. This is what disturbs me most about fascism. We can have different ideas, see life in a different way, but there is no need for all that animosity, that nastiness. ... It is easier to point and lash out at others for frustrations that do not concern the lives of others, but our way of life. It is much easier to lash out at black people, at gays." After the 2022 Italian government crisis, Elodie took to her social media profiles to express her disappointment with the political programme of FdI.

Elodie often points out that she was discriminated for her skin color and social status as a child, being a victim of racism. She has also spoken out for women's rights, calling herself a feminist.

== Discography ==
- Un'altra vita (2016)
- Tutta colpa mia (2017)
- This Is Elodie (2020)
- OK. Respira (2023)
- Mi ami mi odi (2025)

== Awards and nominations ==
Award	Year	Category	Nominated work	Result	Ref.
Amici di Maria De Filippi	2016	Journalistic Critics' Award	Herself	Won	
Amici di Maria De Filippi	2016	RTL 102.5 Award	Herself	Won	
Anec Award	2025	Breakthrough Talent	Fuori	Won	
Bari International Film Festival	2022	Best Breakthrough Actress	Burning Hearts	Won	
Billboard Italia Women in Music	2024	Performer of the Year	Herself	Won	
Ciak d'Oro	2022	Revelation of the Year	Burning Hearts	Won	
David di Donatello	2023	Best Original Song	"Proiettili (ti mangio il cuore)" (from Burning Hearts)	Won	
MTV Europe Music Award	2019	Best Italian Act	Herself	Nominated	
MTV Europe Music Award	2022	Best Italian Act	Herself	Nominated	
MTV Europe Music Award	2023	Best Italian Act	Herself	Nominated	
Nastro d'Argento	2022	Best Original Song	"Proiettili (ti mangio il cuore)" (from Burning Hearts)	Nominated	
Nastro d'Argento	2025	Best Supporting Actress	Fuori	Won	
Radio 105 Summer Festival	2016	Song of the Summer	"Amore avrai"	Nominated	
Rome Film Festival	2022	Women in Cinema Award	Burning Hearts	Won	
TIM Music Awards	2017	Gold Album	Un'altra vita	Won	
TIM Music Awards	2022	Multi-Platinum Single	"La coda del diavolo" (with Rkomi)	Won	
TIM Music Awards	2022	Multi-Platinum Single	"Bagno a mezzanotte"	Won	
TIM Music Awards	2022	EarOne Award	Herself	Won	
TIM Music Awards	2023	Gold Album	OK. Respira	Won	
TIM Music Awards	2023	Multi-Platinum Single	"Due"	Won	
TIM Music Awards	2023	Special Award for Music in Cinema	"Proiettili (ti mangio il cuore)" (from Burning Hearts)	Won	
TIM Music Awards	2024	Best Live Performance	Elodie Show 2023	Won	
Videoclip Italia Awards	2023	Best Styling	"Tribale"	Nominated	
Videoclip Italia Awards	2023	Best Make-Up & Hair	"Tribale"	Nominated	

== Filmography ==
=== Films ===
Year	Title	Role	Notes
2017	Non c'è campo	Herself	Cameo appearance
2020	Trolls World Tour	Barb	Italian dub; voice role
2022	Burning Hearts	Marilena Camporeale	Acting debut
2024	Mufasa: The Lion King	Sarabi	Italian dub; voice role
2025	Dangerous Game	Giada	
2025	Fuori	Barbara	
2026	King Marracash	Herself	Documentary

=== Television ===
Year	Title	Role	Notes
2008	X Factor	Contestant	Eliminated in the castings session
2015–2016	Amici di Maria De Filippi	Contestant	Runner-up (season 15)
2017	Sanremo Music Festival 2017	Contestant	Competing with "Tutta colpa mia" (8th place)
2019	Castrocaro Music Festival 2019	Judge	Annual music festival
2020	Sanremo Music Festival 2020	Contestant	Competing with "Andromeda" (7th place)
2021	Sanremo Music Festival 2021	Co-host/ Performer	Guest for the 2nd night
2021	Celebrity Hunted: Caccia all'uomo	Contestant	Winner (season 2)
2021	Da grande	Performer	Variety show
2021	Le Iene	Guest host	Episode: "Season 25, episode 1"
2023	Sanremo Music Festival 2023	Contestant	Competing with "Due" (9th place)
2023	Sento ancora la vertigine	Herself	Docuseries
2024	Call My Agent - Italia	Herself	Episode: "Season 2, episode 5"
2024	Viva la danza	Performer	Special
2025	Sanremo Music Festival 2025	Contestant	Competing with "Dimenticarsi alle 7" (12th place)
2025	GialappaShow	Guest host	Episode: "Season 5, episode 1"
2025	Sensualità a corte	Catwoman / Cat-Elodie	Episode: "Season 13, episode 1"
2025	Elodie: The Stadium Show	Herself	Concert special
TBA	Nemesis †	Gloria	Upcoming series

=== Music videos ===
List of music videos appearances as an actress (in addition to her own videos)
Year	Title	Artist(s)	Director
2012	"La risposta"	Luchè	Mauro Russo
2015	"Beautiful Disaster"	Fedez and Mika	Mauro Russo
2018	"Monica"	Myss Keta	Motel Forlanini
2020	"La mia hit"	J-Ax feat. Max Pezzali	Fabrizio Conte
2021	"Crazy Love"	Marracash	Giulio Rosati

== Tours ==
Headliner

- This Is Summer – Elodie Live (2020)
- Elodie Show 2023 (2023)
- Elodie Show 2025 (2025)

Events

- Elodie Live 2022 (2022)
- Elodie al Forum (2023)
- The Stadium Show (2025)
