= Tutta colpa mia =

Studio album by Elodie
- Released: 17 February 2017
- Genre: Pop; pop rock
- Length: 43:35
- Label: Universal
- Producer: Luca Mattioni; Emma

Elodie chronology
Un'altra vita (2016)	Tutta colpa mia (2017)	This Is Elodie (2020)

Singles from Tutta colpa mia
- 1. "Tutta colpa mia" Released: 8 February 2017; 2. "Verrà da sé" Released: 28 April 2017; 3. "Semplice" Released: 6 October 2017

Tutta colpa mia is the second studio album by Italian singer Elodie. It was produced by Luca Mattioni and Emma Marrone, and released by Universal Music on 17 February 2017. The album includes the Sanremo Music Festival entry "Tutta colpa mia".

The album peaked at number six on the FIMI Albums Chart.

== Track listing ==
Tutta colpa mia track listing
No.	Title	Writer(s)	Length
1.	"Tutta colpa mia"	Emma Marrone; Gianni Pollex; Oscar Angiuli; Francesco Ciancola	3:18
2.	"Amarsi basterà" (featuring Zibba)	Zibba; Dario Ciffo	3:19
3.	"Fine"	Emma Marrone; Paolo Barillari; Emma Rohan; Jez Ashurst; Mark Bates	4:04
4.	"Semplice"	Federica Abbate; Andrea Amati	3:15
5.	"Sono pazza di te"	Federica Camba; Daniele Coro	3:20
6.	"Verrà da sé"	Emma Marrone; Luca Mattioni; Mario Cianchi	3:05
7.	"La mia strada verso il sole"	Emiliano Cecere; Alberto Pioppi	3:11
8.	"La differenza"	Jack Jaselli; Mario Cianchi; Max Elli	3:56
9.	"Giorni bellissimi"	Giovanni Caccamo; Alessandra Flora	3:25
10.	"La gelosia"	Giulia Anania; Jonny Lattimer; Marco Ciappelli	3:04
11.	"Una favola non è"	Dario Faini; Ermal Meta	3:25
12.	"La cosa che rimane"	Roberto Angelini	3:47
13.	"La verità"	Amara; Salvatore Mineo	3:49
Total length:			43:35

== Charts ==
Weekly chart performance for Tutta colpa mia
Chart (2017)	Peak position
Italian Albums (FIMI)	6
