= Nero Bali =

Single by Elodie, Michele Bravi and Guè

from the album This Is Elodie
- Released: 18 May 2018
- Genre: Dance pop; dancehall reggae
- Length: 3:03
- Label: Universal
- Songwriters: Alessandro Mahmoud; Cosimo Fini; Dario Faini; Simone Benussi
- Producers: Dardust; Mace

Elodie singles chronology
"Quando stiamo bene" (2018)	"Nero Bali" (2018)	"Rambla" (2018)

Michele Bravi singles chronology
"Tanto per cominciare" (2017)	"Nero Bali" (2018)	"La vita breve dei coriandoli" (2020)

Guè Pequeno singles chronology
"Tanta Roba Anthem" (2018)	"Nero Bali" (2018)	"Lungomare latino" (2018)

Music video
- "Nero Bali" on YouTube

"Nero Bali" is a song by Italian singers Elodie and Michele Bravi and Italian rapper Guè. It was produced by Dardust and Mace, and released by Universal Music on 18 May 2018 as the lead single from Elodie's third studio album This Is Elodie.

== Music video ==
The music video for the song, directed by Enea Colmbi, was released on YouTube on the same day.

== Charts ==
=== Weekly charts ===
Weekly chart performance for "Nero Bali"
Chart (2018)	Peak position
Italy (FIMI)	10
Italy Airplay (EarOne)	9

=== Year-end charts ===
Year-end chart performance for "Nero Bali"
Chart (2018)	Position
Italy (FIMI)	47

== Certifications ==
Region	Certification	Certified units/sales
Italy (FIMI)	2× Platinum	100,000^{‡}
^{‡} Sales+streaming figures based on certification alone.
