= Tribale =

2022 single by Elodie

Single by Elodie

from the album OK. Respira
- Language: Italian
- Released: 10 June 2022
- Genre: Dance-pop urban
- Length: 2:42
- Label: Island
- Songwriters: Elodie Di Patrizi; Federica Abbate; Jacopo Ettorre; Federico Mercuri; Giordano Cremona; Eugenio Maimone; Leonardo Grillotti
- Producer: ITACA

Elodie singles chronology
"Bagno a mezzanotte" (2022)	"Tribale" (2022)	"Proiettili (ti mangio il cuore)" (2022)

Music video
- "Tribale" on YouTube

"Tribale" (lit. 'Tribal') is a song co-written and recorded by Italian singer Elodie and produced by the collective ITACA. It was released on 10 June 2022 through Island Records as the third single from her fourth studio album OK. Respira.

The release of the single was announced on 29 May 2022, during Elodie’s interview with Fabio Fazio in the Rai2 show Che tempo che fa. The song had its premiere on 9 June 2022, during the Radio Zeta festival "Future Hits Live 2022".

== Charts ==
=== Weekly charts ===
Chart (2022)	Peak position
Italy (FIMI)	13
Italy Airplay (EarOne)	1

=== Year-end charts ===
Chart (2022)	Peak position
Italy (FIMI)	51

== Certifications ==
Region	Certification	Certified units/sales
Italy (FIMI)	2× Platinum	200,000^{‡}
^{‡} Sales+streaming figures based on certification alone.
