= Un'altra vita (album) =

Studio album by Elodie
- Released: 20 May 2016
- Genre: Pop
- Length: 28:26
- Label: Universal
- Producer: Luca Mattioni; Emma

Elodie chronology
Un'altra vita (2016)	Tutta colpa mia (2017)

Singles from Tutta colpa mia
- 1. "Un'altra vita" Released: 13 May 2016; 2. "Amore avrai" Released: 20 May 2016; 3. "L'imperfezione della vita" Released: 23 September 2016

Un'altra vita (lit. 'Another life') is the debut studio album by Italian singer Elodie. It was produced by Luca Mattioni and Emma Marrone, and released by Universal Music on 20 May 2016.

The album peaked at number 2 on the FIMI Albums Chart and was certified gold in Italy.

== Track listing ==
Un'altra vita track listing
No.	Title	Writer(s)	Length
1.	"Un'altra vita"	Fabrizio Moro; Roberto Cardelli	2:58
2.	"Giorni spensierati"	Moro; Cardelli	3:06
3.	"Due anime perse"	Diego Calvetti; Francesco Renga	3:32
4.	"L'imperfezione della vita"	Federica Abbate	3:57
5.	"Amore avrai"	Emma Marrone; Luca Mattioni; Mario Cianchi	3:29
6.	"Una strada infinita"	Ermal Meta; Cardelli	3:17
7.	"La bellezza del mondo"	Abbate; Alfredo Rapetti	3:36
8.	"Tutto questo"	Federica Camba; Daniele Coro	4:31
Total length:			28:26

== Charts ==
Weekly chart performance for Un'altra vita
Chart (2016)	Peak position
Italian Albums (FIMI)	2
Swiss Albums (Schweizer Hitparade)	86

== Certifications ==
Certifications for Un'altra vita
Region	Certification	Certified units/sales
Italy (FIMI)	Gold	25,000^{*}
^{*} Sales figures based on certification alone.
