= Gargano conflict =

- Part of Mafia wars in Italy
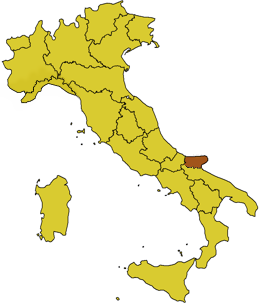
- Location of Gargano within Italy
Date	30 December 1978 – present (47 years, 8 months, 2 weeks and 5 days)
Location	Gargano, Apulia, Italy
Status	Ongoing

Belligerents
Società foggiana	Italy
- Clan Li Bergolis; Clan Miucci
- Clan Romito; Clan Lombardi-La Torre-Ricucci
- Clan Alfieri Primosa

Commanders and leaders
Francesco Libergolis †; Giuseppe Libergolis †; Pasquale Libergolis †; Franco Libergolis; Enzo Miucci Franco Romito †; Michele Romito; Mario Luciano Romito †; Ivan Romito; Michele Romito †; Matteo Lombardi; Pasquale Ricucci †; Pietro La Torre Raffaele Primosa	

Casualties and losses
- 300+ deaths

The Gargano conflict (conflitto or faida del Gargano) is a series of wars involving numerous mafia families in the Gargano area of Apulia, Italy. Initially arising from issues of cattle rustling, these conflicts then turned into a struggle for control of the territory and illegal trafficking: extortion, protection rackets, money laundering, drug trafficking, cigarette smuggling, usury and murder.

== History ==
The feud between the Libergolis and Primosa-Alfieri clans began on December 30, 1978, when Lorenzo Ricucci, accused of cattle rustling, was killed during a dispute with the Libergolis, while his thirteen-year-old son Salvatore was wounded. In 1979, Raffaele Primosa, wounded in a shootout, named Francesco Ciccillo Libergolis as the culprit, triggering the Primosa-Alfieri clan's revenge. In December 1980, Giuseppe Libergolis, Francesco's brother, was killed with a shotgun in a retaliatory attack. In the following decades, the violence between the two clans continued to intensify. In 1989, Peppino and Pietro Alfieri were killed. In 1992, Michele Alfieri, Peppino's son, killed Matteo Libergolis, triggering a series of murders that almost completely decimated the Alfieri-Primosa clan. The Libergolis, however, increased their power, extending their influence throughout the Gargano, with the support of the Romitos. The feuds continued with numerous murders, including those of Pasquale Libergolis (1995) and Michele Alfieri (2010). Between 2000 and 2003, the Libergolis clan was involved in a series of clashes with the Mangini clan, sparking a war for control of drug trafficking and extortion in Manfredonia and Monte Sant'Angelo. In 2003, a scandal emerged during a mafia summit that led to a war between the Libergolis and the Romitos. The 2004 “Iscaro-Saburo” operation led to the arrest of 99 people suspected of being part of the clans involved in the feud. Subsequently, in 2009, the murder of Franco Romito and the ensuing vendettas marked a new chapter of violence and killings between the two groups. Investigations into the Libergolis' mafia activities continued, with arrests and convictions in various trials, such as in 2009, when the Libergolis clan received heavy sentences. Between 2010 and 2021, the feud continued to see murders and attempts at revenge, with the Libergolis, although weakened, managing to maintain a position of power, often by allying themselves with other mafia families.
