= David di Donatello for Best Original Song =

Annual Italian film award

The David di Donatello for Best Original Song (Italian: David di Donatello per la miglior canzone originale) is a film award presented annually by the Accademia del Cinema Italiano (ACI).

The award has been given every year since 2005, with three previous attempts in the 1987, 1989 and 1990 editions.

== Winners and nominees ==
Winners are indicated in bold.

=== 1980s–90s ===
1987

- **"Regalo di Natale"** – Riz Ortolani (Christmas Present)

1989

- **"Felicità"** – Lucio Dalla, Mauro Malavasi (The Sparrow's Fluttering)

1990

- **"Scugnizzi"** – Claudio Mattone (Street Kids)

=== 2000s ===
2005

- **"Christmas in Love"** – Marva Jan Marrow, Tony Renis (Christmas in Love)
- "Fame chimica" – 'O Zulù (Chemical Hunger)
- "Gioia e rivoluzione" – Enzo Del Re (Working Slowly (Radio Alice))
- "Manuale d'amore" – Paolo Buonvino (Manual of Love)
- "Ma quando arrivano le ragazze?" – Riz Ortolani (But When Do the Girls Get Here?)

2006

- **"Insieme a te non ci sto più"** – Caterina Caselli (The Goodbye Kiss)

2007

- **"La paranza"** and **"Mi persi"** – Daniele Silvestri (Night Bus)

2008

- **"L'amore trasparente"** – Ivano Fossati (Quiet Chaos)

2009

- **"Herculaneum"** – Robert Del Naja, Neil Davidge (Gomorrah)

=== 2010s ===
2010

- **"Baciami ancora"** – Jovanotti (Kiss Me Again)
- "Angela" – Checco Zalone (Cado dalle nubi)
- "Sogno" – Marco Giacomelli, Fabio Petrillo, Ilaria Cortese, Patty Pravo (Loose Cannons)
- "21st Century Boy" – Valerio Casini, Bad Love Experience (The First Beautiful Thing)
- "Canzone in prigione" – Cristiano Godano, Gian Luca Bergia, Riccardo Tesio, Marlene Kuntz (Tutta colpa di Giuda)

2011

- **"Mentre dormi"** – Max Gazzè, Gimmi Santucci (Basilicata Coast to Coast)

2012

- **"If It Falls, It Falls"** – David Byrne, Will Oldham, Michael Brunnock (This Must Be the Place)

2013

- **"Tutti i santi giorni"** – Virginiana Miller (Every Blessed Day)

2014

- **"'A verità"** – Franco Ricciardi, Nelson, Rosario Castagnola, Sarah Tartuffo (Song'e Napule)

2015

- **"Anime nere"** – Giuliano Taviani, Massimo De Lorenzo (Black Souls)

2016

- **"Simple Song #3"** – David Lang, Sumi Jo (Youth)

2017

- **"Abbi pietà di noi"** – Enzo Avitabile, Angela Fontana, Marianna Fontana (Indivisible)

2018

- **"Bang bang"** – Pivio and Aldo De Scalzi, Nelson, Serena Rossi, Franco Ricciardi, Giampaolo Morelli (Love and Bullets)
- "A chi appartieni" – Dario Sansone, Foja (Cinderella the Cat)
- "Fidati di me" – Mauro Pagani, Massimo Ranieri, Antonella Lo Coco (Riccardo va all'inferno)
- "Italy" – Anja Plaschg, Anton Spielmann, Soap & Skin (Sicilian Ghost Story)
- "The Place" – Marco Guazzone, Giovanna Gardelli, Matteo Curallo, Stefano Costantini, Edoardo Cicchinelli, Marianne Mirage (The Place)

2019

- **"Mystery of Love"** – Sufjan Stevens (Call Me By Your Name)
- "L'invenzione di un poeta" – Nicola Piovani, Aisha Cerami, Tosca (There's No Place Like Home)
- "Araceae" – Apparat, Philipp Thimm, Simon Brambell (Call Me By Your Name)
- "'A speranza" – Enzo Avitabile (The Vice of Hope)
- "'Na gelosia" – Lele Marchitelli, Peppe Servillo, Toni Servillo (Loro)

=== 2020s ===
2020

- **"Che vita meravigliosa"** – Diodato (The Goddess of Fortune)
- "Festa" – Aiello, Shoshi Md Ziaul, Moonstar Studio (Bangla)
- "Rione Sanità" – Ralph P (The Mayor of Rione Sanità)
- "Un errore di distrazione" – Brunori Sas (The Guest)
- "Suspirium" – Thom Yorke (Suspiria)

2021

- **"Immigrato"** – Checco Zalone, Antonio Iammarino (Tolo Tolo)
- "Gli anni più belli" – Claudio Baglioni (The Best Years)
- "Invisible" – Marco Biscarini, La Tarma (Hidden Away)
- "Io sì (Seen)" – Laura Pausini, Diane Warren, Niccolò Agliardi (The Life Ahead)
- "Miles Away" – Pivio and Aldo De Scalzi, Ginevra Nervi (Thou Shalt Not Hate)

2022

- **"La profondità degli abissi"** – Manuel Agnelli (Diabolik)
- "Faccio 'a polka" – Nicola Piovani, Dodo Gagliarde, Anna Ferraioli Ravel (I fratelli De Filippo)
- "Just You" – Giuliano Taviani, Carmelo Travia, Marianna Travia ( A Girl Returned)
- "Nei tuoi occhi" – Francesca Michielin, Andrea Farri (Marilyn's Eyes)
- "Piccolo corpo" – Fredrika Stahl, Laura Samani, Celeste Cescutti (Small Body)

2023

- **"Proiettili (ti mangio il cuore)"** – Elodie, Joan Thiele, Elisa Toffoli, Emanuele Triglia (Burning Hearts)
- "Se mi vuoi" – Diodato (Diabolik: Ginko Attacks!)
- "Caro amore lontanissimo" – Marco Mengoni, Sergio Endrigo, Riccardo Sinigallia (The Hummingbird)
- "Culi culagni" – Stefano Bollani, Luigi Malerba (Il pataffio)
- "La palude" – Niccolò Falsetti, Giacomo Pieri, Alessio Ricciotti, Francesco Turbanti, Emanuele Linfatti, Matteo Creatini (Margins)

2024

- **"La mia terra"** – Diodato (Palazzina Laf)
- "Adagio" from – Samuel Umberto Romano, Massimiliano Casacci, Davide Dileo, Enrico Matta, Luca Vicini, Subsonica (Adagio)
- "Baby" – Andrea Farri, Seydou Sarr (Io capitano)
- "'O DJ (Don't Give Up)" – Liberato (Mixed by Erry)
- "La vita com'è" – Brunori Sas (The Best Century of My Life)

== See also ==
- David di Donatello for Best Score
- Cinema of Italy
