= Rkomi =

Italian rapper (born 1994)

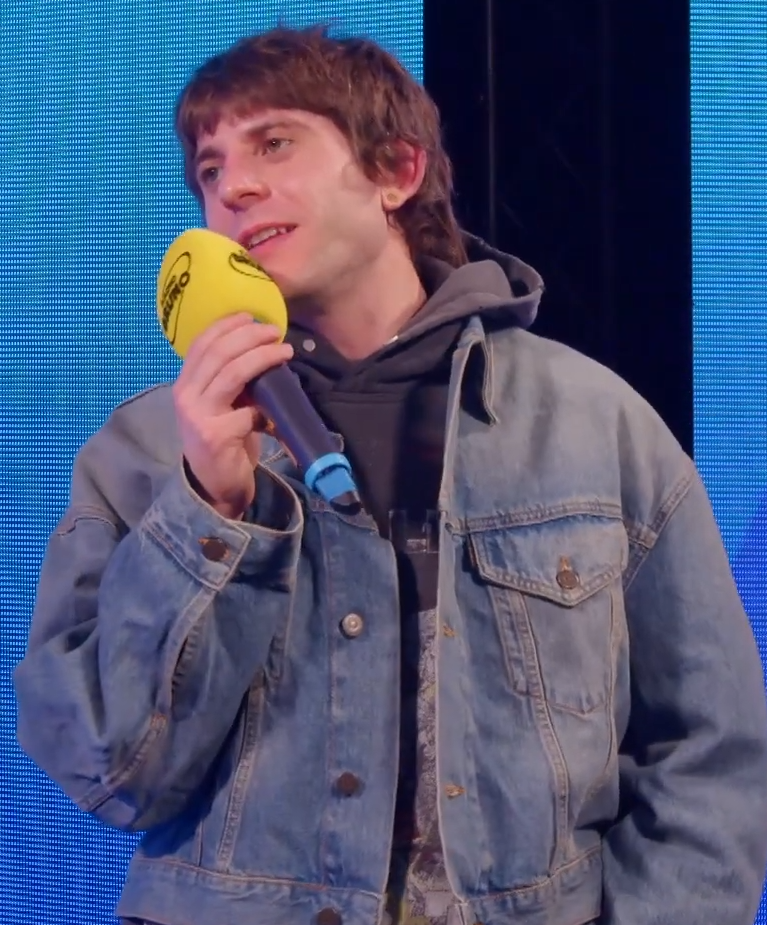
- Rkomi in February 2025

Background information
- Born: Mirko Manuele Martorana; 19 April 1994 (age 32); Milan, Italy
- Genres: Pop rap; indie rap
- Occupations: Singer; songwriter; rapper
- Years active: 2012–present
- Label: Universal

Mirko Manuele Martorana (born 19 April 1994), known professionally as Rkomi, is an Italian singer, songwriter and rapper.

== Early life ==
Rkomi was born and raised in Milan in the famous district of Calvairate, located in the eastern part of the suburbs of Milan. He attended the CFP Galdus hotel Institute until the third year, and then dropped out at the age of 17 without obtaining a diploma. Until the age of 21 he worked as a bartender, bricklayer and dishwasher.

He became friends with rapper Tedua, who was his roommate. Tedua himself originally planned to become a tour manager.

== Career ==
=== Calvairate Mixtape and Dasein Sollen ===
Rkomi has stated several times that he was initiated into a musical career due to his best friend Tedua.

Rkomi's first musical projects were Keep Calm Mixtape (with Sfazo) and Quello che non fai tu (with Falco) in 2012, Cugini Bella Vita EP (with Pablo Asso) in 2013, followed by the more famous amateur songbook Calvairate Mixtape, which was created by six people (including Tedua and Izi), in 2014.

That was followed by almost two years of silence, then Rkomi published the song Dasein Sollen on the YouTube platform. The song's title is a direct reference to the Heideggerian concept of Dasein. The rapper learned about it through a random search on the Internet. On 13 October 2016 Rkomi released an EP Dasein Sollen in collaboration with the Digital Distribution label.

=== First collaborations and Io in terra ===
Following the good reception of Dasein Sollen (the single Aeroplanini di carta, created in collaboration with Izi, was certified platinum), Rkomi was hired by an indie singer-songwriter Calcutta for the opening of the show live in Turin.

Having come into contact with Shablo, former producer of the album Aeroplanini di carta, Rkomi decides to sign a contract with the Rock Music label managed by Shablo himself and Marracash. On 13 March 2017 the rapper announced that he was going to release his first studio album Universal.

On 8 September 2017 Rkomi released the album Io in terra, consisting of 14 tracks, some of them created in collaboration with Marracash (in Milano Bachata), Noyz Narcos (in Verme) and Alberto Paone (in Mai più), a drummer. The album was preceded by the singles Solo, Apnea and Mai più. After its debut in the music charts, Io in terra reached the top of the FIMI chart and was certified gold, while Milano Bachata, Apnea and Mai più were certified platinum.

=== Ossigeno – EP and Dove gli occhi non arrivano ===
On 26 June 2018 Rkomi announced the upcoming release of an EP, entitled Ossigeno – EP, which was released on 13 July 2019 accompanied by a vinyl edition and an autobiographical book. The CD features the single Acqua calda e limone, which was written in collaboration with rapper Ernia, as well as songs written in collaboration with Tedua, Night Skinny and Mc Bin Laden. At the end of 2018, the single Non ho mai tanto la mia età was released on the occasion of the release of the video game Assassin's Creed: Origins. It is a tribute to a video game saga created by Ubisoft. Solletico and Acqua calda e limone were certified gold.

On 19 February 2019 Rkomi revealed that he intended to release the album Dove gli occhi non arrivano, which was released on 22 March 2020. Jovanotti, Elisa, Carl Brave, Sfera Ebbasta, Dardust and Ghali also worked on the disc. The album successfully debuted at the top of the FIMI rating, as did Io in terra.

=== 2021–present: Taxi Driver, Sanremo Festival and No Stress ===
In April 2021, Rkomi announced his third studio album Taxi Driver, which was released on 30 April. The first single from the album "Ho spento il cielo" with Tommaso Paradiso was released on 14 April. The album debuted at the top of the FIMI Album Chart, while the track "Nuovo range", a collaboration with Sfera Ebbasta, reached the top of the Top Single. On 24 September 2021 the live album Taxi Driver (MTV Unplugged) was released. It included previous tracks edited and sung live.

In December 2021, Rkomi published the collaboration La coda del diavolo with Elodie, which peaked at number one on the Italian singles chart. The same month Rkomi participation in the Sanremo Music Festival 2022 with the song "Insuperabile", where it placed 17th in the grand final. The songs were included in the reissue of Taxi Driver +. In February 2022 he collaborated with Elisa on the song Quello che manca from the singer studio album Ritorno al futuro/Back to the Future.

In July 2023 Rkomi released the collaborative album No Stress with Irama.

In December 2024, Rkomi was announced as one of the participants in the Sanremo Music Festival 2025. He placed 28th with the song "Il ritmo delle cose".

== Style and influences ==
Although the rapper's first songs belong to pure rap and do not include other genres, Rkomi proposed himself as an exponent of indie rap. The album Io in terra has often been considered as an example of hip-hop influenced by the genres of prog, funk and others, because of the original and innovative bases (in addition to the drums, the electric bass, guitar and trumpet appear). With Ossigeno - EP, Rkomi began to approach a more funk and pop version of rap, establishing a new musical dimension with the album Dove gli occhi non arrivano, characterized by purely pop sharing.

Rkomi's work was influenced by such indie artists as Saint PHNX, Gorillaz and Twenty One Pilots. As for hip-hop, the rapper's work was influenced by Italian artists Noyz Narcos, Marracash, Fabri Fibra, Gué Pequeno, and such foreign artistes as German rapper Cro, French rapper Lomepal and American rappers Tyler, the Creator, Chance the Rapper and Kendrick Lamar.

== Discography ==
=== Studio albums ===
List of studio albums, with chart positions and certifications
Title	Details	Peak chart positions		Certifications
Title	Details	ITA	SWI	Certifications
Io in terra	Released: 8 September 2017; Label: Universal; Format: LP, CD, digital download	1	—	FIMI: Platinum
Dove gli occhi non arrivano	Released: 22 March 2019; Label: Universal; Format: LP, CD, digital download	1	—	FIMI: 2× Platinum
Taxi Driver	Released: 30 April 2021; Label: Universal, Island; Format: LP, CD, digital download	1	31	FIMI: 9× Platinum
No Stress (with Irama)	Released: 7 July 2023; Label: Atlantic, Island; Format: LP, CD, digital download	2	—	FIMI: Platinum
Decrescendo	Released: 22 May 2025; Label: Island; Format: CD, digital download	3	100	FIMI: Gold

=== Live albums ===
Title	Details
Taxi Driver (MTV Unplugged)	Released: 24 September 2021; Label: Universal, Island; Format: digital download

=== Extended plays ===
Title	Details	Certification
Cugini bella vita (with Pablo Asso)	Released: 21 November 2013; Label: independent; Format: digital download	
Dasein Sollen	Released: 13 October 2016; Label: Digital Distribution; Format: CD, digital download	FIMI: Platinum
Ossigeno – EP	Released: 13 July 2018; Label: Universal; Format: CD, digital download	FIMI: Platinum
...dal vivo (Live in Milano)	Released: 23 April 2020; Label: Universal, Island; Format: digital download	

=== Singles ===
==== As lead artist ====
Title	Year	Peak chart positions	Certifications	Album
Title	Year	ITA	Certifications	Album
"Aeroplanini di carta" (featuring Izi)	2016	—		Dasein Sollen
"Solo"	2017	65	FIMI: Gold	Io in terra
"Apnea"	2017	48	FIMI: 2× Platinum	Io in terra
"Mai più"	2017	19	FIMI: Platinum	Io in terra
"Milano Bachata" (featuring Marracash)	2017	9	FIMI: 2× Platinum	Io in terra
"Acqua calda e limone" (featuring Ernia)	2018	45	FIMI: Platinum	Ossigeno – EP
"Non ho mai avuto la mia età"	2018	68		Non-album single
"Blu" (featuring Elisa)	2019	9	FIMI: 2× Platinum	Dove gli occhi non arrivano
"Visti dall'alto" (featuring Dardust)	2019	13	FIMI: Platinum	Dove gli occhi non arrivano
"Canzone" (featuring Jovanotti)	2019	23		Dove gli occhi non arrivano
"Nuove strade" (with Ernia, Madame, Gaia, Samurai Jay and Andry the Hitmaker)	2020	51		Non-album single
"Ho spento il cielo" (with Tommaso Paradiso)	2021	13	FIMI: Platinum	Taxi Driver
"Partire da te"	2021	7	FIMI: 4× Platinum	Taxi Driver
"Luna piena" (with Irama and Shablo)	2021	12	FIMI: 5× Platinum	Taxi Driver
"La coda del diavolo" (featuring Elodie)	2021	1	FIMI: 6× Platinum	Taxi Driver+
"Insuperabile"	2022	6	FIMI: 3× Platinum	Taxi Driver+
"Ossa rotte"	2022	44	FIMI: Gold	Taxi Driver+
"Hollywood" (with Irama and Shablo)	2023	17	FIMI: 2× Platinum	No Stress
"Sulle pelle" (with Irama)	2023	—		No Stress
"Odio, quindi sono"	2024	—		Non-album single
"Il ritmo delle cose"	2025	10	FIMI: Gold	Decrescendo
"Apnea da un po'"	2025	42		Decrescendo
"L'ultima infedeltà"	2025	96		Decrescendo
"Dirti no"	2025	63		Decrescendo
"Vacci piano" (with Emma)	2026	42		Non-album single
"Carica"	2026	96		A Milano

==== As featured artist ====
Title	Year	Peak chart positions	Certifications	Album
Title	Year	ITA	Certifications	Album
"Fuck Tomorrow" (The Night Skinny featuring Rkomi)	2016	—		Pezzi
"Pezzi" (The Night Skinny featuring Guè and Rkomi)	2017	43		Pezzi
"Bimbi" (Charlie Charles featuring Izi, Rkomi, Sfera Ebbasta, Tedua and Ghali)	2017	3	FIMI: 2× Platinum	Non-album single
"Business Class" (Marracash featuring Rkomi)	2018	19	FIMI: Gold	Marracash (10 anni dopo)
"Acquagym" (Ackeejuice Rockers featuring Rkomi)	2019	—	FIMI: Gold	Non-album single
"Oblò" (Bresh featuring Rkomi)	2019	—		Che io mi aiuti
"Blu Part II" (Elisa featuring Rkomi)	2019	75	FIMI: Gold	Diari aperti (Segreti svelati)
"Vento sulla Luna" (Annalisa featuring Rkomi)	2019	74		Nuda
"Colori" (Tedua featuring Rkomi)	2020	7	FIMI: Gold	Vita vera mixtape
"5 gocce" (Irama featuring Rkomi)	2022	3	FIMI: 5× Platinum	Il giorno in cui ho smesso di pensare
"Parli di me" (Bresh featuring Rkomi)	2022	35		Oro blu
"Per averti" (Pyrex featuring Rkomi)	2022	47	FIMI: Gold	Love Is War
"Good Girl" (The Night Skinny featuring Rkomi, Ernia and Bresh)	2024	18		Containers
"Fuck Tomorrow 2" (The Night Skinny featuring Rkomi and Karakaz)	2024	—		Containers
"Sto bene al mare" (Marco Mengoni featuring Sayf and Rkomi)	2025	21	FIMI: Gold	Non-album single
"Girasole" (22simba featuring Rkomi)	2026	32		La cura, in nome di Miria

== Awards and nominations ==
- MTV Europe Music Awards
  - 2021 — Nomination Best Italian Act
- Sanremo Music Festival
  - 2022 — 17th place with the song "Insuperabile"
  - 2025 — 28th place with the song "Il ritmo delle cose"
