= Proiettili (ti mangio il cuore) =

Single by Elodie and Joan Thiele

from the album OK. Respira
- Released: 16 September 2022
- Genre: Pop rock
- Length: 4:22
- Label: Universal
- Songwriters: Elodie Di Patrizi; Alessandra Joan Thiele; Elisa Toffoli; Emanuele Triglia
- Producers: Joan Thiele; Emanuele Triglia

Elodie singles chronology
"Tribale" (2022)	"Proiettili (ti mangio il cuore)" (2022)	"OK. Respira" (2022)

Joan Thiele singles chronology
"Atto III – L'errore" (2021)	"Proiettili (ti mangio il cuore)" (2022)	"Verdad" (2023)

Music video
- "Proiettili (ti mangio il cuore)" on YouTube

"Proiettili (ti mangio il cuore)" (transl. "Bullets (I'll eat your heart)") is a song written and recorded by Italian singers Elodie and Joan Thiele. It was written by the two artists with co-writing contribution by Elisa Toffoli and Emanuele Triglia, and was released as a digital download and for streaming on 16 September 2022 by Universal Music Group.

The song was part of the original soundtrack of the film Burning Hearts by Pippo Mezzapesa and was later included in Elodie's fourth album OK. Respira. It was awarded with the David di Donatello for Best Original Song.

== Music video ==
A music video to accompany the release of "Proiettili (ti mangio il cuore)" was first released onto YouTube on the same day. The video was directed by Roberto Ortu and shot in Margherita di Savoia, Apulia.

== Accolades ==
Awards and nominations for "Proiettili (ti mangio il cuore)"
Year	Ceremony	Award	Result	Ref.
2023	David di Donatello	Best Original Song	Won	
2023	Nastro d'Argento	Best Original Song	Nominated	
