= Vertigine =

Single by Elodie

from the album OK. Respira
- Released: 24 September 2021
- Genre: Pop; R&B
- Length: 3:37
- Label: Island
- Songwriters: Elisa Toffoli; Davide Petrella; Dario Faini
- Producer: Dardust

Elodie singles chronology
"Parli parli" (2020)	"Vertigine" (2021)	"La coda del diavolo" (2021)

Music video
- "Vertigine" on YouTube

"Vertigine" is a song recorded by Italian singer Elodie. It was released by Island Records on 24 September 2021 as the lead single from her fourth studio album OK. Respira.

The song was written by Elisa, Dario Faini and Davide Petrella, and produced by Dardust.

== Music video ==
A visual music video for the song, directed by Attilio Cusani, was released on YouTube on 23 September 2021.

== Charts ==
Weekly chart performance for "Vertigine"
Chart (2021)	Peak position
Italy (FIMI)	40
Italy Airplay (EarOne)	1

== Certifications ==
Region	Certification	Certified units/sales
Italy (FIMI)	Platinum	100,000^{‡}
^{‡} Sales+streaming figures based on certification alone.
