= Joan Thiele =

Italian singer-songwriter (born 1991)

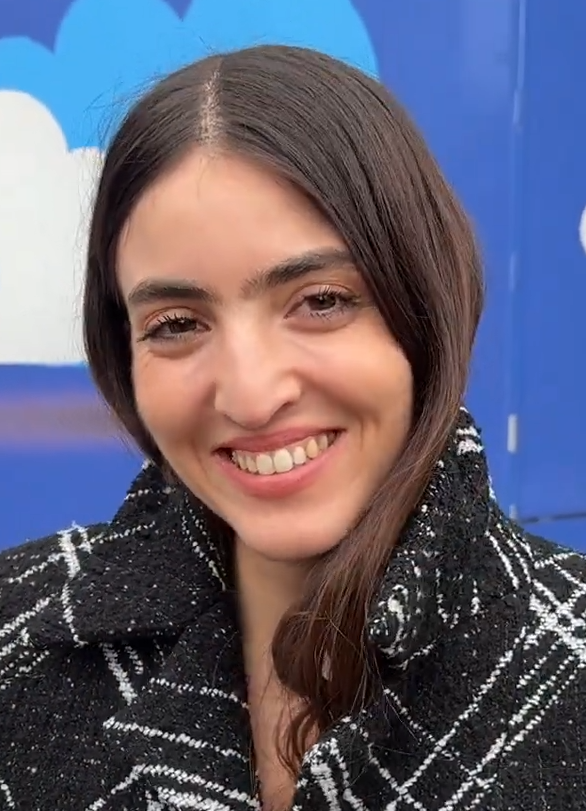
- Thiele in 2025

Background information
- Born: Alessandra Joan Thiele; 21 September 1991 (age 35); Cartagena, Colombia
- Origin: Milan, Italy
- Genres: R&B; pop; jazz; soul
- Occupations: Singer; songwriter
- Instruments: Vocals; guitar
- Works: Discography
- Years active: 2015–present
- Labels: Universal; Polydor; Undamento; Numero Uno; Sony Music
- Website: joanthiele.com

Alessandra Joan Thiele (Italian pronunciation: [alesˈsandra dʒon ˈtiːle, - ˈdʒɔːan -]; born 21 September 1991) is an Italian singer-songwriter.

== Early life ==
Alessandra Joan Thiele was born in Cartagena, Colombia, to an Italian mother from Naples and a Swiss father of Colombian descent. She has one brother, Giovanni. She spent her early childhood in Cartagena before moving to Italy with her mother after her parents separated; she grew up near Lake Garda. At the age of 18, she moved to London. She later moved back to Italy at the age of 20 and settled in Milan.

== Career ==
=== 2015–2018: Career beginnings and Tango ===
Thiele began pursuing music as a busker at the age of 16. In 2015, she released a cover of Drake's "Hotline Bling". The following year, she released her first single, "Save Me", and her first extended play, Joan Thiele. Two more radio singles, "Taxi Driver" and "Armenia", followed suit, the latter of which was featured in the second season of the Spanish teen drama television series Elite. In 2018, she performed at the SXSW Music Festival in Austin, Texas. Later that year, she released her first studio album, Tango, which was preceded by the singles "Fire" and "Polite". In 2019, she collaborated with Myss Keta, together with Elodie and Priestess, on a new version of the song "Le ragazze di Porta Venezia".

=== 2019–2024: Artist collaborations and Atti ===
In March 2020, she collaborated with rapper Nitro on the song "No Privacy / No Caption Needed". She also released Operazione oro, her second extended play and first in Italian, which was preceded by the singles "Le vacanze", "Puta", and "Bambina".

In February 2021, she was featured on Mace's album OBE, appearing on the song "Senza fiato" alongside Venerus. Later that year, she released Atto I - Memoria del futuro, Atto II - Disordinato spazio, and Atto III - L'errore, a three-part project which was eventually released as one collection, Atti, in May 2022. In September 2022, she was featured on the song "Proiettili (ti mangio il cuore)" by Elodie, which was included on the soundtrack of the film Burning Hearts; the song later won the David di Donatello for Best Original Song and was nominated for the Nastro d'Argento for Best Original Song.

In April 2024, she once again collaborated with producer Mace on the song "Viaggio contro la paura" with rapper Gemitaiz. That December, she released the single "Veleno".

=== 2025–present: Sanremo Music Festival and Joanita ===
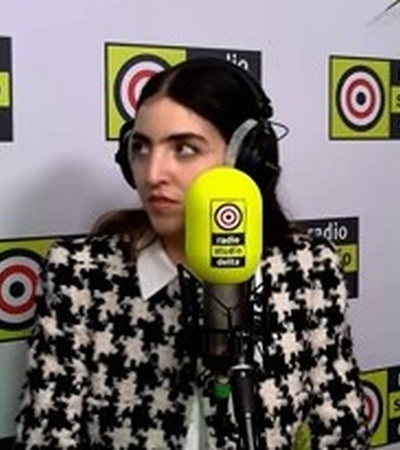
Thiele in 2025

In February 2025, she competed in the 75th Sanremo Music Festival with the song "Eco", which finished in twentieth place. During the fourth evening dedicated to covers, she duetted with Frah Quintale, singing Gino Paoli's song "Che cosa c'è". That month, she released Joanita, her second studio album and first project performed entirely in Italian. That May, she performed at the Concerto del Primo Maggio in Rome, and later embarked on Joanita Tour 2025, an eight-date summer tour from 24 May to 14 August. On 27 June, she released the single "Allucinazione". Later that year, she collaborated with Shablo on the track "Che storia sei?" with Joshua and Nayt. She also collaborated with Fabri Fibra on the single "Milano baby" and with Frah Quintale on the track "Occhi diamanti". On 26 November, she won Singer-Songwriter of the Year at Billboard Italia Women in Music.

At the Rockol Awards in January 2026, she won Best Artist of the Year and the SIAE Special Award. The following month, she appeared in the film Franco Battiato - Il lungo viaggio, directed by Renato De Maria. She also performed a cover of Jimmy Fontana's "Il mondo" at the 2026 Winter Olympics closing ceremony and sang a duet of Fabrizio De André's "La canzone dell'amore perduto" with Nayt at the Sanremo Music Festival 2026.

== Personal life ==
Thiele is in a relationship with artist Carlo Cossignani.

== Discography ==
- Tango (2018)
- Joanita (2025)

== Tours ==
- 2021 – Joan Thiele estate 2021
- 2022 – Joan Thiele estate 2022
- 2025 – Joanita Tour 2025
- 2026 – Joanita Tour 2026

== Filmography ==
Year	Title	Role	Ref.
2026	Franco Battiato - Il lungo viaggio	Young fan	

== Awards and nominations ==
Award	Year	Category	Recipient(s)	Result	Ref.
Billboard Italia Women in Music	2025	Singer-Songwriter of the Year	Joan Thiele	Won	
David di Donatello	2023	Best Original Song	"Proiettili (ti mangio il cuore)" (with Elodie)	Won	
Nastro d'Argento	2023	Best Original Song	"Proiettili (ti mangio il cuore)" (with Elodie)	Nominated	
Rockol Awards	2025	Singer-Songwriter of the Year	Joan Thiele	Won	
Rockol Awards	2025	SIAE Special Award	Joan Thiele	Won	
