= Bagno a mezzanotte =

2022 single by Elodie

Single by Elodie

from the album OK. Respira
- Language: Italian
- Released: 9 March 2022
- Recorded: 2021
- Genre: Dance pop
- Length: 2:58
- Label: Island
- Songwriters: Elisa Toffoli; Stefano Tognini; Alessandro Pulga
- Producers: Zef; Marz

Elodie singles chronology
"La coda del diavolo" (2021)	"Bagno a mezzanotte" (2022)	"Tribale" (2022)

Music video
- "Bagno a mezzanotte" on YouTube

"Bagno a mezzanotte" (lit. 'Midnight bathing') is a song recorded by Italian singer Elodie. It was released on 9 March 2022 through Island Records as the second single from her fourth studio album OK. Respira.

All proceeds from sales of the song were donated to projects run by Save the Children to support the Ukrainian population following the Russian invasion of Ukraine.

On 30 May 2022, during the Heroes Festival, Elisa performed the song together with Elodie, and the duet was later included in Elisa's album Back to the Future Live.

== Composition ==
The song, written by Elisa, who also sings the bridge, with production by Zef and Marz, was described by Elodie through a statement:

"It is a single made for dancing, turning up the volume, partying and staying up until dawn. Collaborating with Elisa is always an inspiration to me. This gift tells all about her generosity, passion and care for music and others"

== Charity ==
On March 8, the singer explained that the income from sales of the song will be donated to projects curated by Save the Children to support the Ukrainians following the Russian invasion of Ukraine, motivating that "so many children, so many of them very young, are losing their homes, their families, their daily lives and their futures in these hours. The war, with all that it brings, will leave an indelible mark on their lives. To remain helpless is impossible." Regarding the initiative, Save the Children's director general Daniela Fatarella said:

"We gratefully welcomed this beautiful gesture of generosity by Elodie, who confirms herself to be an artist with great sensitivity. The Ukrainian children need all our help because they have already suffered far too much. The only way to stop this, we will never tire of repeating, is the immediate cessation of hostilities, to protect children from violence and other violations of their rights. Elodie's voice will help us shout it louder."

== Charts ==
=== Weekly charts ===
Chart (2022)	Peak position
Italy (FIMI)	4
Italy Airplay (EarOne)	1

=== Year-end charts ===
Chart (2022)	Peak position
Italy (FIMI)	17

== Certifications ==
Region	Certification	Certified units/sales
Italy (FIMI)	4× Platinum	400,000^{‡}
^{‡} Sales+streaming figures based on certification alone.
