= Myss Keta =

Italian rapper

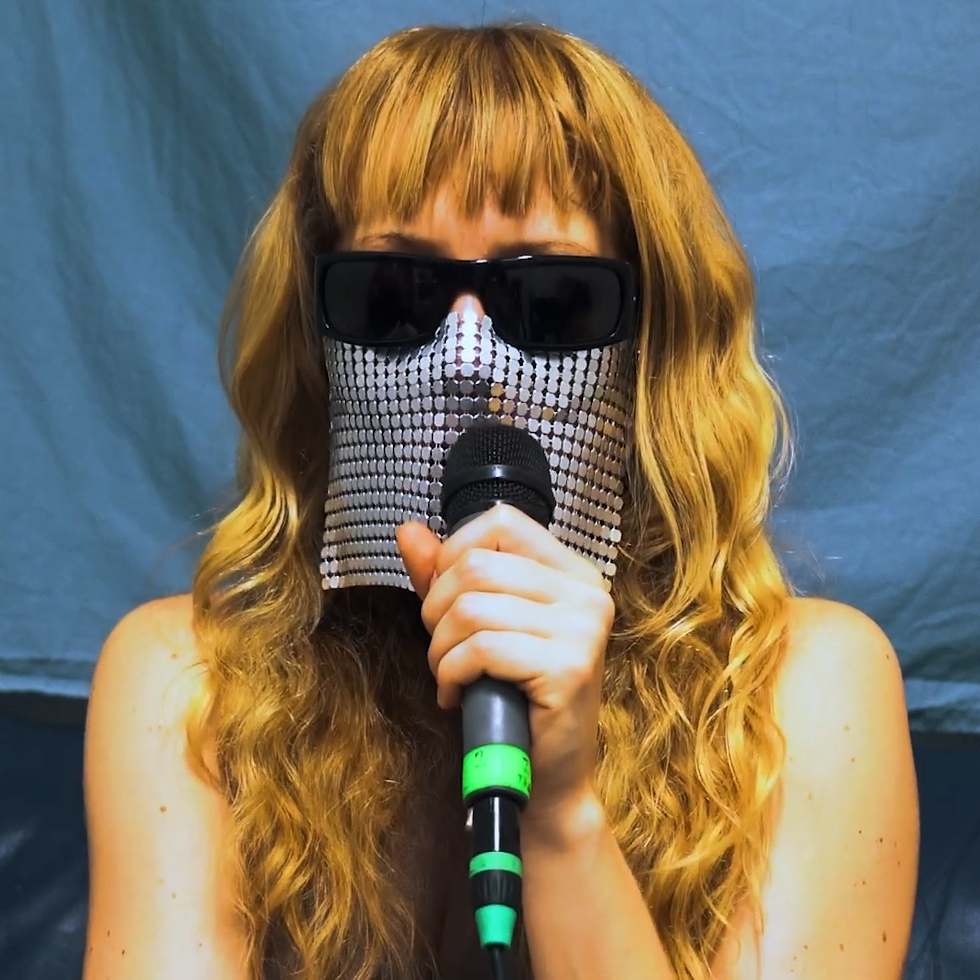
- Myss Keta in 2025

Background information
- Origin: Milan, Italy
- Genres: Electronic; trap
- Label: Universal
- Website: myssketa.club

Myss Keta (stylized as M¥SS KETA) is a pseudonymous Italian rapper. Described as an "icon of anti-establishment and queer culture in Italy" by Billboard magazine, her musical style has been cited as mixing electronic music with punk rock, and her cited influences include the sub-genre fidget house.

== Biography ==
The Myss Keta pseudonym birthed on August 14, 2013, from Motel Forlanini, an underground music collective project established in Forlanini Park in Milan. This project included producer Stefano Riva, director Simone Rovellini and graphic designer Dario Pigato. Their first single "Milano sushi & coca" was released October of that year, receiving widespread media coverage, along with criticism of the music video's provocative content.

In 2014, Myss Keta released "Illusione distratta". In 2015, her music video "Burqa di Gucci" was released, where she wears a veil covering her face from the nose up alongside a pair of sunglasses. This became part of her public appearance throughout the rest of her career.

In 2016, she published the mixtape L'angelo dall'occhiale da sera, which sampled music from the 1960s and 70s. On June 23, 2017, she published the EP Carpaccio ghiacciato and "Xananas".

On April 20, 2018, her debut album Una vita in Capslock was released by Universal Music Group. On March 29, 2019, she released her second album Paprika which featured various Italian musical artists including Dark Polo Gang, Elodie, Gabry Ponte, and Mahmood.

Myss Keta co-hosted the program L'altro Festival, a talk show about 2020 Sanremo Music Festival, alongside Nicola Savino.

In 2021, she won the second season of the Italian version of Celebrity Hunted with Elodie.
