= Rockol =

Italian online magazine

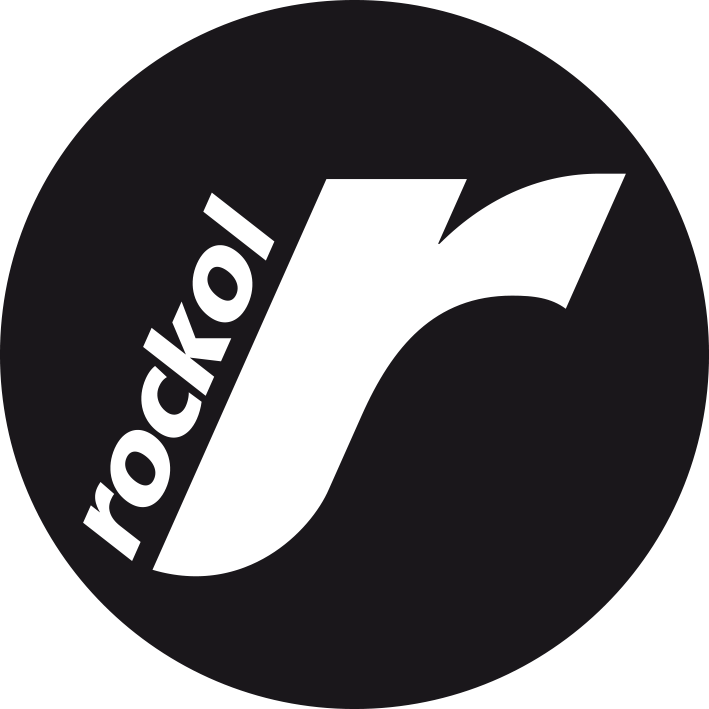
- Editor: Giampiero Di Carlo
- Frequency: Online
- Founder: Giampiero Di Carlo
- First issue: 1995; 31 years ago
- Company: Rockol.com S.r.l.
- Country: Italy
- Based in: Milan
- Language: Italian
- Website: www.rockol.it

Rockol is an Italian online music magazine, founded in 1995.

== Background ==
The publisher and executive director is Giampiero Di Carlo, author and professor of Economics and Music Industry in the master's degree in Music Communications at the Catholic University of the Sacred Heart. The editorial director is Franco Zanetti, a writer and journalist who is considered one of the leading Italian experts on the Beatles.

In 2016, it received the Macchianera Awards as the best Italian music website. In 2017, it received a similar award at the Targa Mei Musicletter Award. Rockol is considered one of the largest Italian music sites in terms of quality and traffic.

Rockol belongs to Rockol.com S.R.L., which also owns the newspaper organization Rock Online Italia, registered in 1996.

== Rockol Awards ==
Since 2017, the Rockol Awards have been awarded annually, where awards are given to both Italian and foreign artists.
