= Mahmood discography =

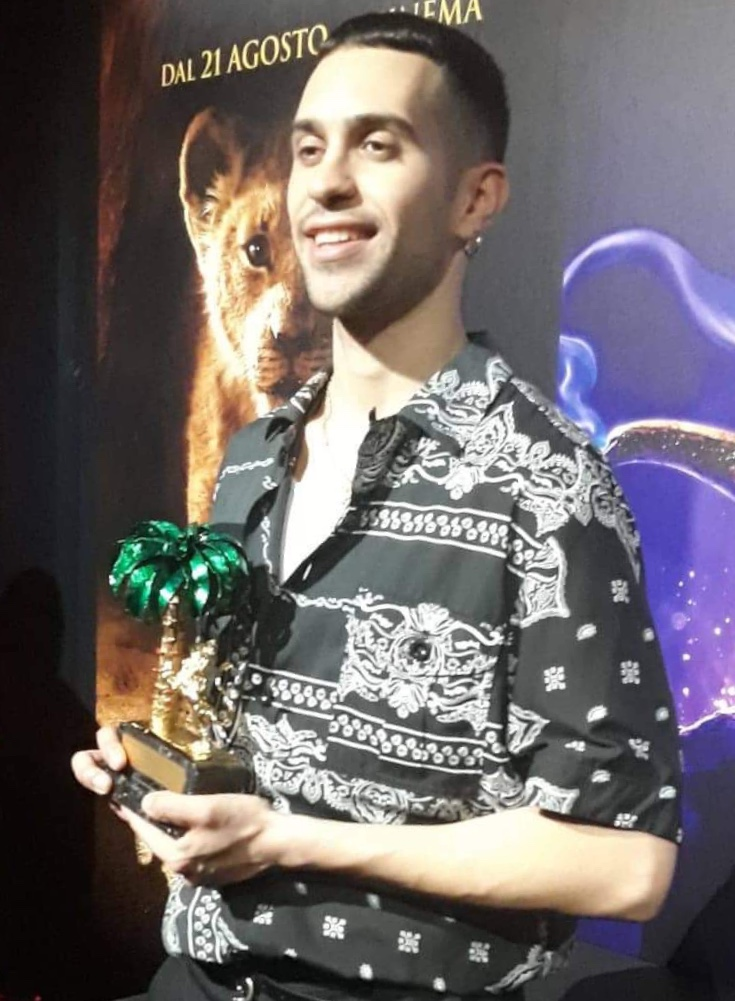
- Mahmood in February 2019
- Studio albums: 3
- EPs: 1
- Singles: 19
- Music videos: 11

Italian singer Mahmood has released three studio albums, one extended play, nineteen singles as primary artist and eleven music videos. After winning the 69th Sanremo Music Festival with his number one single "Soldi", he released his debut studio album, Gioventù bruciata in February 2019, which topped the Italian albums chart. "Soldi" also became a hit in several European countries. In April 2019, Mahmood was featured on the number one single "Calipso" by Charlie Charles and Dardust. Between 2019 and 2020, he also released the singles "Barrio", "Rapide", "Moonlight popolare" and "Dorado", all of which entered the top ten in Italy. "Tuta gold", the lead single from his third studio album Nei letti degli altri (2024), was the best-selling song in Italy of 2024.

Mahmood frequently appeared as a featured artists in tracks by Italian hip hop artists such as Gué Pequeno and Marracash. He also co-wrote songs with other Italian pop singers, including Marco Mengoni, Francesca Michielin and Elodie.

== Studio albums ==
List of studio albums, with selected chart positions
Title	Details	Peak chart positions					Certifications
Title	Details	ITA	NOR	SPA	SWE	SWI	Certifications
Gioventù bruciata	Released: 22 February 2019; Label: Island; Format: CD, digital download, vinyl	1	18	—	34	34	FIMI: Platinum
Ghettolimpo	Released: 11 June 2021; Label: Island; Format: CD, digital download, vinyl	2	—	80	—	24	FIMI: Platinum
Nei letti degli altri	Released: 16 February 2024; Label: Island; Format: CD, digital download, vinyl	1	—	—	—	27	FIMI: 2× Platinum

== Extended plays ==
List of extended plays, with selected chart positions
Title	Details	Peak chart positions
Title	Details	ITA
Gioventù bruciata	Released: 21 September 2018; Label: Island; Format: Digital download	6

== Singles ==
=== As lead artist ===
List of singles as lead artist, with selected chart positions, showing year released and album name
Title	Year	Peak chart positions										Certifications	Album
Title	Year	ITA	AUT	FRA	GRE	NLD	SPA	SWE	SWI	UAE	UK	Certifications	Album
"Fallin' Rain"	2013	—	—	—	—	—	—	—	—	*	—		Non-album singles
"Dimentica"	2016	—	—	—	—	—	—	—	—	*	—		Non-album singles
"Pesos"	2017	—	—	—	—	—	—	—	—	*	—		Non-album singles
"Uramaki"	2018	86	—	—	—	—	—	—	—	*	—		Gioventù bruciata
"Milano Good Vibes"	2018	—	—	—	—	—	—	—	—	*	—		Gioventù bruciata
"Asia occidente"	2018	—	—	—	—	—	—	—	—	*	—		Gioventù bruciata
"Gioventù bruciata"	2018	40	—	—	—	—	—	—	—	*	—	FIMI: Gold	Gioventù bruciata
"Soldi"	2019	1	12	67	1	16	5	8	5	*	73	FIMI: 4× Platinum; PROMUSICAE: 2× Platinum; SNEP: Gold	Gioventù bruciata
"Barrio"	2019	4	—	—	61	—	—	—	—	*	—	FIMI: 2× Platinum	Non-album single
"Rapide"	2020	5	—	—	—	—	—	—	—	*	—	FIMI: 2× Platinum	Ghettolimpo
"Moonlight popolare" (with Massimo Pericolo)	2020	3	—	—	—	—	—	—	—	*	—	FIMI: Gold	Non-album single
"Dorado" (featuring Sfera Ebbasta and Feid)	2020	10	—	—	22	—	—	—	—	*	—	FIMI: 2× Platinum	Ghettolimpo
"Inuyasha"	2021	21	—	—	—	—	—	—	—	*	—	FIMI: Platinum	Ghettolimpo
"Zero"	2021	44	—	—	—	—	—	—	—	*	—		Ghettolimpo
"Klan" (with DRD)	2021	42	—	—	—	—	—	—	—	*	—	FIMI: Gold	Ghettolimpo
"Rubini" (featuring Elisa)	2021	31	—	—	—	—	—	—	—	*	—	FIMI: Platinum	Ghettolimpo
"Brividi" (with Blanco)	2022	1	—	—	28	— (Note: "Brividi" did not chart on the Dutch Single Top 100 chart, but did reach number two on the Dutch Single Tip chart.)	95	59	1	*	— (Note: "Brividi" did not chart on the UK Singles Chart, but peaked at number 67 on the UK Singles Sales Chart Top 100.)	FIMI: 8× Platinum	Non-album single
"Cocktail d'amore"	2023	32	—	—	—	—	—	—	—	—	—	FIMI: Gold	Nei letti degli altri
"Tuta gold"	2024	1	—	—	11	—	—	—	2	—	—	FIMI: 5× Platinum	Nei letti degli altri
"Ra ta ta"	2024	6	—	—	—	—	—	—	—	—	—	FIMI: 2× Platinum	Nei letti degli altri
"Sottomarini"	2025	58	—	—	—	—	—	—	—	—	—		Nei letti degli altri
"Mashooqa" (with Pritam, Amitabh Bhattacharya, Raghav Chaitanya and Ruaa Kayy)	2026	—	—	—	—	—	—	—	—	20	—		Cocktail 2 (soundtrack)
"—" denotes a recording that did not chart or was not released in that territory. "*" denotes that the chart did not exist at that time.

=== As featured artist ===
List of singles as featured artist, with selected chart positions, showing year released and album name
Title	Year	Peak chart positions	Certifications	Album or EP
Title	Year	ITA	Certifications	Album or EP
"Luna" (Fabri Fibra featuring Mahmood)	2017	—		Fenomeno – Masterchef
"Calipso" (Charlie Charles and Dardust featuring Sfera Ebbasta, Mahmood and Fabri Fibra)	2019	1	FIMI: 4× Platinum	Produced by Charlie Charles
"Bel Air" (Todiefor featuring Mahmood and Poupie)	2022	—		Non-album single
"—" denotes a recording that did not chart or was not released in that territory.

== Other charted songs ==
List of charting songs that were not released as singles, showing year released and album name
Title	Year	Peak chart positions			Certifications	Album
Title	Year	ITA	BEL (WA)	FRA	Certifications	Album
"Doppio Whisky" (Gué Pequeno featuring Mahmood)	2018	91	—	—		Sinatra
"Karate" (Gemitaiz and MadMan featuring Mahmood)	2019	8	—	—	FIMI: Gold	Scatola nera
"Non sono Marra (La pelle)" (Marracash featuring Mahmood)	2019	11	—	—	FIMI: Platinum	Persona
"8rosk1" (tha Supreme featuring Mahmood)	2019	23	—	—	FIMI: Gold	23 6451
"Tardissimo" (Gué Pequeno featuring Mahmood and Marracash)	2020	15	—	—	FIMI: Platinum	Mr. Fini
"Giorno del giudizio" (Paky featuring Mahmood and Luchè)	2022	23	—	—		Salvatore
"Addio" (Night Skinny, Rkomi and Ernia featuring Mahmood and Gazzelle)	2022	33	—	—		Botox
"Personale" (featuring Geolier)	2024	24	—	—	FIMI: Platinum	Nei letti degli altri
"Sempre / Jamais" (featuring Angèle)	2024	85	12	167		Nei letti degli altri
"Nei letti degli altri"	2024	89	—	—		Nei letti degli altri
"Neve sulle Jordan" (featuring Capo Plaza)	2024	66	—	—		Nei letti degli altri
"Paradiso" (featuring Chiello and Tedua)	2024	50	—	—		Nei letti degli altri
"No Drama" (Capo Plaza featuring Mahmood)	2024	32	—	—		Ferite
"Sant'allegria" (Ornella Vanoni featuring Mahmood)	2024	97	—	—		Diverse
"—" denotes a recording that did not chart or was not released in that territory.

== Guest appearances ==
List of non-single guest appearances, with other performing artists, showing year released and album name
Title	Year	Other performer(s)	Album
"Presi male"	2017	Michele Bravi	Anime di carta - Nuove pagine
"Doppio Whisky"	2018	Guè Pequeno	Sinatra
"Fa paura perché è vero"	2019	M¥SS KETA	Paprika
"Karate"	2019	Gemitaiz & MadMan	Scatola nera
"Non sono Marra (La pelle)"	2019	Marracash	Persona
"8rosk1"	2019	tha Supreme	23 6451
"Tardissimo"	2020	Gué Pequeno, Marracash	Mr. Fini
"Luna fortuna"	2020	—N/a	Note di viaggio – Capitolo 2
"Amor de mi vida 2021"	2021	Sottotono	Originali
"Sabri Aleel"	2021	Paolo Buonvino	Taranta Reimagined
"Natural Blues"	2021	Zucchero Fornaciari	Discover
"Giorno del giudizio"	2022	Paky, Luchè	Salvatore
"Addio"	2022	Night Skinny, Rkomi, Ernia, Gazzelle	Botox
"Lontano dai guai"	2023	Guè	Madreperla
"In fondo al mar"	2023	La Sirenetta Cast	La Sirenetta (Colonna Sonora Originale)
"Baciala"	2023	Alessia Amendola, Ciro Clarizio	La Sirenetta (Colonna Sonora Originale)
"Il grande scoop"	2023	Alessia Amendola	La Sirenetta (Colonna Sonora Originale)
"Proibito"	2023	Drillionaire, Taxi B, Fabri Fibra	10
"Televisione"	2023	Davide Petrella	Chiamami quando la magia finisce
"No Drama"	2024	Capo Plaza	Ferite
"Sant'allegria"	2024	Ornella Vanoni	Diverse
"La terra di Hamdis"	2025	Carmen Consoli	Amuri luci
"Paura"	2025	Charlie Charles	La bella confusione
"Introstreet"	2026	Liberato	Radio Liberato

== Music videos ==
List of music videos, showing year released and directors
Title	Year	Director(s)	Ref.
"Fallin' Rain"	2013	Davide Dadez Sala	
"Dimentica"	2016	Andrea Mattia Grieco	
"Pesos"	2017	Martina Pastori	
"Uramaki"	2018	Martina Pastori	
"Milano Good Vibes"	2018	Attilio Cusani	
"Gioventù bruciata"	2018	Attilio Cusani	
"Soldi"	2019	Attilio Cusani	
"Calipso" (Charlie Charles and Dardust featuring Sfera Ebbasta, Mahmood and Fabri Fibra)	2019	Attilio Cusani	
"Barrio"	2019	Attilio Cusani	
"Rapide"	2020	Attilio Cusani	
"Moonlight popolare" (featuring Massimo Pericolo)	2020	Martina Pastori	
"Dorado"	2020	Attilio Cusani	
"Inuyasha"	2021	Simone Rovellini	
"Klan"	2021	Attilio Cusani	
"Kobra"	2021	Attilio Cusani	
"Brividi" (with Blanco)	2022	Attilio Cusani	

== Songwriting credits ==
List of songs written or co-written by Mahmood and performed by other artists
Title	Year	Artist	Album
"Nero Bali" (Written by Alessandro Mahmoud, Cosimo Fini, Dario Faini and Vanni Casagrande)	2018	Elodie, Michele Bravi and Guè	This Is Elodie
"Sobrio" (Written by Cosimo Fini, Alessandro Mahmoud, Lorenzo Urciullo, Daniele Lazzarin, Paolo Alberto Monachetti and Pablo Miguel Lombroni Capalbo)	2018	Guè featuring Elodie	Sinatra
"Hola (I Say)" (Written by Marco Mengoni, Thomas Alexander Walker, Alessandro Mahmoud and Francesco Catitti)	2018	Marco Mengoni featuring Tom Walker	Atlantico
"Mille lire" (Written by Marco Mengoni, Alessandro Mahmoud, Fabio Ilacqua and Alessandro Merli)	2018	Marco Mengoni	Atlantico
"Rivoluzione" (Written by Marco Mengoni, Alessandro Mahmoud and Dario Faini)	2018	Marco Mengoni	Atlantico
"Hola" (Written by Marco Mengoni, Alessandro Mahmoud and Francesco Catitti)	2018	Marco Mengoni	Atlantico
"Parolacce" (Written by Alessandro Mahmoud and Stefano Tognini)	2019	Sergio Sylvestre	Non-album single
"L'ultima canzone del mondo" (Written by Chiara Galiazzo, Alessandro Mahmoud and Francesco Catitti)	2019	Chiara Galiazzo	Bonsai
"Cheyenne" (Written by Alessandro Mahmoud, Alessandro Raina, Davide Simonetta and Paolo Alberto Monachetti)	2019	Francesca Michielin featuring Charlie Charles	Feat (stato di natura)
"Duemila volte" (Written by Marco Mengoni, Alessandro Mahmoud, Alessandro Raina and Davide Simonetta)	2019	Marco Mengoni	Atlantico / On Tour
"Andromeda" (Written by Alessandro Mahmoud and Dario Faini)	2020	Elodie	This Is Elodie
"Kamikaze" (Written by Chiara Galiazzo, Alfredo Rapetti, Alessandro Mahmoud and Francesco Catitti)	2020	Chiara Galiazzo	Bonsai
"Rosa naturale" (Written by Alessandro Mahmoud, Emiliano Giambelli, Matteo Soru and Simone Benussi)	2020	Roshelle featuring Emis Killa	Non-album single
"Chiamami per nome" (Written by Francesca Michielin, Federico Lucia, Alessandro Mahmoud, Alessandro Raina, Jacopo D'Amico and Davide Simonetta)	2021	Francesca Michielin and Fedez	Feat (Fuori dagli spazi)
"Glicine" (Written by Alessandro Mahmoud, Ginevra Lubrano, Francesco Fugazza and Dario Faini)	2021	Noemi	Metamorfosi
"Senza lacrime" (Written by Alessandro Mahmoud, Ginevra Lubrano, Federica Abbate, Silvia Tufani, Francesco Fugazza and Marcello Grilli)	2021	Noemi	Metamorfosi
"Partire da te" (Written by Mirko Martorana, Alessandro Mahmoud, Francesco Catitti and Umberto Odoguardi)	2021	Rkomi	Taxi Driver
"Ti amo non lo so dire" (Written by Alessandro Mahmoud, Alessandro La Cava and Dario Faini)	2022	Noemi	Non-album singles
"Dimmi"; "Dime"; (Written by Matteo Bocelli, Alessandro Mahmoud and Silvia Tofani)	2022	Matteo Bocelli	Non-album singles
"Asteroidi" (Written by Ginevra Lubrano, Alessandro Mahmoud, Riccardo Schiara, Francesco Fugazza and Marcello Grilli)	2022	Ginevra	Diamanti
"Normale" (Written by Alessandro Mahmoud, Riccardo Schiara, Dario Faini, Mario Fracchiola and Massimiliano Dagani)	2022	Giorgia	Blu
"Purple in the Sky" (Written by Elodie Di Patrizi, Alessandro Mahmoud, Davide Petrella and Dario Faini)	2023	Elodie	OK. Respira
"Mai più" (Written by Elodie Di Patrizi, Alessandro Mahmoud, Davide Petrella, Stefano Tognini and Dario Faini)	2023	Elodie	OK. Respira
"Apocalisse" (Written by Alessandro Mahmoud and Dario Faini)	2023	Elodie	OK. Respira
"Una come cento" (Written by Elodie Di Patrizi, Alessandro Mahmoud and Francesco Catitti)	2023	Elodie	OK. Respira
"Se t'innamori muori" (Written by Alessandro Mahmoud, Riccardo Fabbriconi and Michele Zocca)	2025	Noemi	Nostalgia
