= Persona (Marracash album) =

Studio album by Marracash
- Released: October 31, 2019
- Genre: Alternative hip hop; conscious hip hop
- Label: Island Records; Universal Music Italia
- Producer: Marz; Low Kidd; TY1; Zef; Dardust; Charlie Charles; Demo Casanova; Rashaad Wiggins; Big Fish; Takagi & Ketra

Marracash chronology
Santeria (2016)	Persona (2019)	Noi, loro, gli altri (2021)

Singles from Persona
- 1. "Bravi a cadere – I polmoni" Released: November 1, 2019; 2. "Sport – I muscoli" Released: March 27, 2020

Persona is the fifth studio album by Italian rapper Marracash, released on 31 October 2019 by Island Records and Universal Music Italia. The album originally consisted of 15 tracks. The single "Neon – Le ali", written and performed with Italian singer Elisa, was also composed for the album, but it was later scrapped and released as a standalone single, due to not completing it on time. The track was later added to Persona's streaming version track listing.

Praised by Italian music critics, the album placed at number one on Rolling Stone Italia's list of the Best Albums of 2019. It also became a commercial success, spending six non-consecutive weeks atop the FIMI Italian Albums Chart. After placing at number five on the Italian year-end albums chart of 2019, it also became the top-selling record of 2020 in Italy. As of January 2021, all its 15 original tracks, as well as "Neon - Le ali", were certified platinum in Italy, while the album was certified diamond by the Federation of the Italian Music Industry, denoting 500,000 equivalent album units.

== Critical reception ==
Persona was very well received by several Italian music critics. Rockol.it gave the album a rating of 8 out of 10, highlighting Marracash' ability to describe his personal crisis while keeping himself far away from rap clichés, and praising the production's cohesion with lyrical content, as well as featured artists' connection with the view expressed by Marracash in its album. Federico Traversa described it as "one of the best rap albums of the last ten years", applauding its cultural depth.

Writing for the Italian version of GQ, Giuditta Avellina considered the album as a proof of Marracash still being "the King of Rap" in Italy. Ernesto Assante placed Persona among the 15 best Italian albums of 2019 on la Repubblica, describing it as "a perfect album, rap, hip hop, electronic music, sharp word and love lyrics". According to Rolling Stone Italia, it was the best Italian album of the year, with Marta Blumi Tripodi writing that "Persona was able to get everyone to agree and, most of all, to touch and emotionally involve everyone".

== Track listing ==
Persona – Standard track listing
No.	Title	Lyrics	Music	Producer(s)	Length
1.	"Body Parts - I denti"	Fabio Rizzo; Lorenzo Paolo Spinosa	Alessandro Pulga; Spinosa	Marz; Low Kidd	2:36
2.	"Qualcosa in cui credere - Lo scheletro" (featuring Guè)	Rizzo; Cosimo Fini	Pulga	Marz	3:32
3.	"Quelli che non pensano - Il cervello" (featuring Coez)	Rizzo; Silvano Albanese; Giulia Puzzo; Sebastiano Ruocco; Francesco Di Gesù; Davide Petrella	Puzzo; Ruocco; Di Gesù; Gianluca Cranco	TY1	3:10
4.	"Appartengo - Il sangue" (featuring Massimo Pericolo)	Rizzo; Alessandro Vanetti; Franco Migliacci; Ernesto Migliacci	Pulga; Stefano Acqua	Marz	4:15
5.	"Poco di buono - Il fegato"	Rizzo; Nicola Salerno	Pulga; Annette Tucker; Nancie Mantz	Marz	3:05
6.	"Bravi a cadere - I polmoni"	Rizzo; Petrella; Lorenzo Urciullo; Antonio Di Martino; Luca Serpenti	Rizzo; Pulga; Stefano Tognini	Zef; Marz	3:20
7.	"Non sono Marra - La pelle" (featuring Mahmood)	Rizzo; Alessandro Mahmoud	Mahmoud; Giampaolo Parisi; Dario Faini; Cranco	TY1; Dardust	3:08
8.	"Supreme - L'ego" (featuring Thasup and Sfera Ebbasta)	Rizzo; Davide Mattei; Gionata Boschetti	Rizzo; Pulga; Paolo Alberto Monachetti	Marz; Charlie Charles	3:43
9.	"Sport - I muscoli" (featuring Luchè)	Rizzo; Luca Imprudente	Demo Casanova; Spinosa; Rashaad Wiggins	Low Kidd; Demo Casanova; Rashaad Wiggins	3:22
10.	"Da buttare - Il ca**o"	Rizzo	Spinosa	Low Kidd	3:24
11.	"Crudelia - I nervi"	Rizzo	Pulga; Tognini	Marz; Zef	3:50
12.	"G.O.A.T - Il cuore"	Rizzo	Massimiliano Dagani; Gabriel Rossi	Big Fish	3:30
13.	"Madame - L'anima" (featuring Madame)	Rizzo; Francesca Calearo	Pulga	Marz	3:41
14.	"Tutto questo niente - Gli occhi"	Rizzo	Pulga	Marz	3:30
15.	"Greta Thunberg - Lo stomaco" (featuring Cosmo)	Rizzo; Marco Jacopo Bianchi	Pulga	Marz	2:46

Persona – Streaming edition bonus tracks
No.	Title	Lyrics	Music	Producer(s)	Length
16.	"Sport + Muscoli" (Remix version featuring Luchè, Lazza, Paky and Taxi B)	Rizzo; Imprudente; Jacopo Lazzarini; Vincenzo Mattera; Michele Ballabene	Spinosa; Casanova	Low Kidd; Casanova; Wiggins	4:46
17.	"Neon – Le ali" (featuring Elisa)	Rizzo; Elisa Toffoli; Petrella	Alessandro Merli; Fabio Clemente	Takagi & Ketra; Marz

== Charts ==
=== Weekly charts ===
Chart (2019)	Peak position
Italian Albums (FIMI)	1
Swiss Albums (Schweizer Hitparade)	48

=== Year-end charts ===
Chart (2019)	Position
Italian Albums (FIMI)	5
Chart (2020)	Position
Italian Albums (FIMI)	1
Chart (2021)	Position
Italian Albums (FIMI)	17
Chart (2023)	Position
Italian Albums (FIMI)	18

== Certifications ==
Region	Certification	Certified units/sales
Italy (FIMI)	Diamond	500,000^{‡}
^{‡} Sales+streaming figures based on certification alone.
