= Rapide =

Rapide can refer to:

- de Havilland Dragon Rapide, a British short-haul passenger airplane
- Vincent Rapide, a British 998cc v-twin cylinder motorcycle made from 1936–1955
- Cars built by Aston Martin:
  - Aston Martin Rapide - concept car exhibited in 2006, production car from 2010–2020
  - Lagonda Rapide - production car from 1961–1964
- "Rapide" (song), a 2020 song by Italian singer Mahmood
- National Express Rapide, a brand of express coach once used by National Express
- Rapide (ADL), an architecture description language developed by David Luckham at Stanford University
