= Barrio (song) =

Single by Mahmood
- Released: 30 August 2019
- Recorded: 2019
- Genre: R&B
- Length: 2:45
- Label: Island Records
- Songwriters: Alessandro Mahmoud; Davide Petrella; Dario Faini; Paolo Alberto Monachetti
- Producers: Charlie Charles; Dardust

Mahmood singles chronology
"Calipso" (2019)	"Barrio" (2019)	"Rapide" (2020)

"Barrio" is a song by Italian singer Mahmood. It was released for digital download on 30 August 2019 by Island Records. The song peaked at number four on the Italian Singles Chart. It was written by Mahmood, Davide Petrella, Dario Faini, and Paolo Alberto Monachetti and produced by latter two.

== Background ==
On 26 August 2019, Mahmood released a teaser for his new single on social media. The song was produced by Dardust and Charlie Charles. The duo also produced the single "Calipso", which Mahmood features on. The song was certified gold in Italy. Wiwibloggs said, "A Latin slap in the face, the track comes with a contemporary beat that mixes exotic elements like a flamenco guitar with Mahmood’s signature sound. Inspired by the Francisco Tárrega, who composed the well-known piece "Capricho árabe" back in 1892, it unites Arabic and Spanish culture."

== Track listing ==
Digital download
No.	Title	Length
1.	"Barrio"	2:45

== Charts ==
=== Weekly charts ===
Chart (2019)	Peak position
Greece (IFPI)	61
Italy (FIMI)	4
Italy Airplay (EarOne)	1
San Marino (SMRRTV Top 50)	6

=== Year-end charts ===
Chart (2019)	Position
Italy (FIMI)	62

== Certifications ==
Region	Certification	Certified units/sales
Italy (FIMI)	2× Platinum	140,000^{‡}
^{‡} Sales+streaming figures based on certification alone.

== Release history ==
Region	Date	Format	Label
Italy	30 August 2019	Digital download; streaming	Island Records
