= Neon – Le ali =

Single by Marracash and Elisa

from the album Persona (digital edition only)
- Language: Italian
- Released: 6 March 2020
- Recorded: 2019
- Genre: Pop rap
- Length: 3:27.
- Label: Universal Music Italy; Island
- Songwriters: Fabio Rizzo; Elisa Toffoli; Davide Petrella; Alessandro Merli
- Producers: Takagi & Ketra; Marz

Marracash singles chronology
"Bravi a cadere - I polmoni" (2019)	"Neon – Le ali" (2020)	"Sport - I muscoli" (2020)

Elisa singles chronology
"Soul" (2019)	"Neon – Le ali" (2020)	"Andrà tutto bene" (2020)

Music video
- "Neon – Le ali" on YouTube

"Neon – Le ali" is a song written and recorded by Italian rapper Marracash and Italian singer-songwriter Elisa. The song was released as a single on March 6, 2020, through Island Records. Originally intended as a single from Marracash studio album Persona, the song was later scrapped and included only in its streaming version.

The song peaked at number five of the Italian singles chart, becoming Marracash's 5th and Elisa's 17th top-five song on the chart. The song was also certified platinum by Federazione Industria Musicale Italiana.

== Composition ==
The song was written by the rapper and the singer-songwriter themselves with Davide Petrella and Alessandro Merli, during the recording sessions of the album Persona, being discarded, however, due to the tight schedule for the release of the album. Regarding the genesis of the song, Marracash stated:

"A few months ago, in the middle of the night and my existential crisis, Elisa wrote to me. She had filmed herself singing on the piano a chorus she had written especially for me, which was wonderful. The message was a crucial dose of confidence at a difficult time. We talked for hours, about the past, depression, how we are made. Elisa was a friend more than others who profess to be such, and not only that night."

Elisa reported through her social networks the motivation for the collaboration with the rapper and the meaning of the song:

"I see Fabio a little bit as one of the highlanders of Italian music because like me he has been around for quite a while. I have always noticed his strong observational spirit and in this I feel similar to him. It happened that we had very serious talks and we also psychoanalyzed each other a little, as one does among friends. [...] I like how he thinks and how he chooses words, and even when he talks about darkness he has a light inside, always on, even when he thinks it is off. He has always been and will always remain among the greatest. We finally did a song together, it was a dream that was left hanging but now it is reality."

== Cover art and promotion ==
"Neon - Le ali" was announced with two photos depicting the artists with a butterfly resting on their mouths, a reference to the movie "The Silence of the Lambs".

It was first performed live on the occasion of the two singers' participation in Power Hits Summer 2020.

On May 31, 2022, during the three concert-events at the Verona Arena for the Heroes Festival 2022 directed by Elisa, the latter performed the song together with Marracash. Subsequently, the two versions were included in Elisa's live album Back to the Future Live, released on November 25 of the same year.

== Music video ==
The official music video, directed by Nicola Bussei and Fabio Giavara, was published on the rapper's YouTube official channel on 12 March 2020.

== Charts ==
=== Weekly charts ===
Chart (2020)	Peak position
Italy (FIMI)	5
Italy Airplay (EarOne)	1

=== Year-end charts ===
Chart (2020)	Position
Italy (FIMI)	90

== Certifications ==
Certifications for "Neon – Le ali"
Region	Certification	Certified units/sales
Italy (FIMI)	Platinum	70,000^{‡}
^{‡} Sales+streaming figures based on certification alone.
