= Soldi =

2019 single by Mahmood

Single by Mahmood

from the album Gioventù bruciata
- English title: "Money"
- Released: 6 February 2019
- Genre: R&B; Moroccan pop
- Length: 3:15
- Label: Island
- Songwriters: Alessandro Mahmoud; Paolo Alberto Monachetti; Dario Faini
- Producers: Charlie Charles; Dardust

Mahmood singles chronology
"Gioventù bruciata" (2018)	"Soldi" (2019)	"Calipso" (2019)

Music video
- "Soldi" on YouTube

Eurovision Song Contest 2019 entry
- Country: Italy
- Artist: Mahmood
- Languages: Italian; Arabic
- Composers: Paolo Alberto Monachetti; Dario "Dardust" Faini; Alessandro Mahmoud
- Lyricist: Alessandro Mahmoud

Finals performance
- Final result: 2nd
- Final points: 472

Entry chronology
- ◄ "Non mi avete fatto niente" (2018)
- "Fai rumore" (2020) ►

"Soldi" (Italian pronunciation: [ˈsɔldi]; transl. "Money") is a song written and recorded by Italian singer Mahmood. It was released on 6 February 2019, as the fifth single from his debut studio album, Gioventù bruciata (2019). The singer co-wrote the song with Dario Faini and Charlie Charles, who also produced it.

Mahmood performed the song for the first time at the 69th Sanremo Musical Festival in February 2019 and won the competition, receiving the right to represent Italy in the Eurovision Song Contest 2019. "Soldi" was later confirmed as his Eurovision entry, eventually reaching second place in the final. The song is predominantly in Italian, with one line in Arabic, making it the fourth time that a Eurovision song features the Arabic language after entries by Morocco in 1980, Israel in 2009 and Bulgaria in 2012. "Soldi" topped the charts in Greece, Israel, Italy and Lithuania and reached the top 10 in five more countries. The song became the most-streamed Eurovision song ever on Spotify, a record held until late January 2021 when it was surpassed by the 2019 Eurovision winner, "Arcade" by Duncan Laurence.

== Background and composition ==
Interviewed by TV Sorrisi e Canzoni, Mahmood revealed he started writing the song while hanging out with some friends. Despite this, it took a long time for him to complete the song. Producers Dardust and Charlie Charles contributed its sound, renewing it with contemporary elements borrowed from trap music. Hip hop sounds are also mixed with Arabic influences.

The song structure does not include a proper chorus. According to Italian producer and musician Andrea Rodini, the song's hook is based on three different elements: the repetition of the word "soldi" (money), the verse "come va" (what's up?), pronounced multiple consecutive times, and the sound of clapping hands, which Rodini describes as a "cubistic" chorus.

"Soldi" is an autobiographic song about Mahmood's "unconventional family". Its lyrics explore Mahmood's relationship with his father, who left his family while he was a child. It depicts a lying, contradictory and unreliable father, whose main priority is money instead of his own family. Money is therefore represented as one of the causes of the end of a father-and-son relationship, marking a strong departure from trap music themes, which usually depicts money as the ultimate goal of life. Mahmood explained that the song's lyrics "evoke a memory" and that "there's a lot of anger" in it. Its verses reproduce a series of different pictures, often used by Mahmood as metaphors.

The song also includes a sentence in Arabic. Although he cannot speak Arabic, Mahmood explained that he remembers how his Egyptian father called him when he was a child, and that he chose to include this verse as a way to bring him back to a particular moment in time.

== Song contests ==
=== Sanremo Music Festival ===
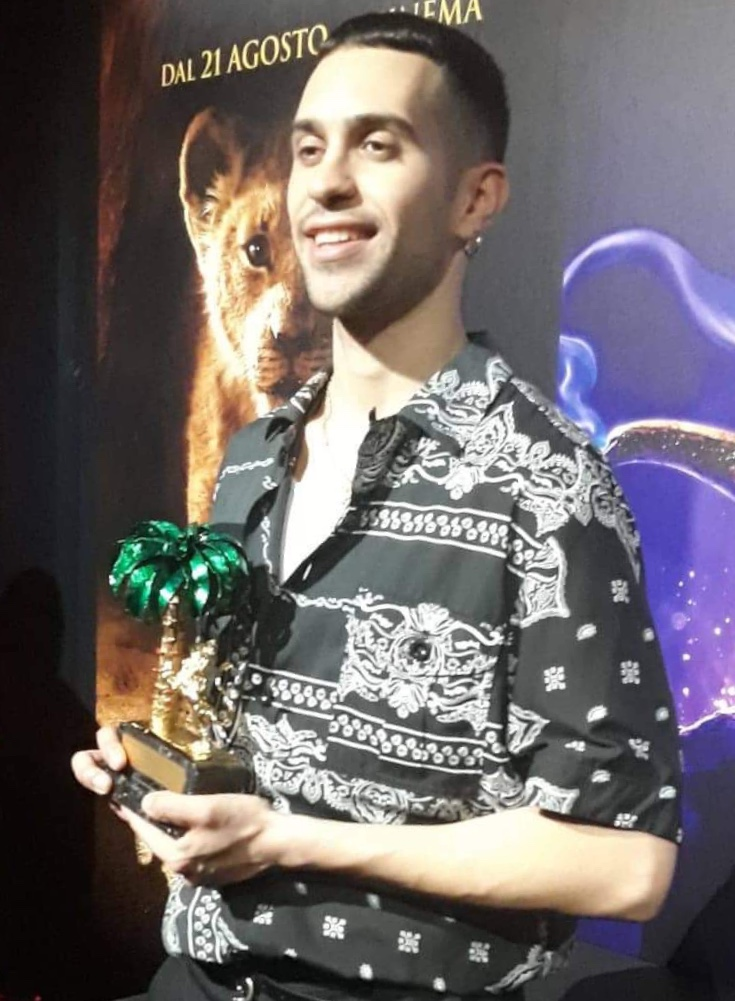
Mahmood with the Golden Lion award received for placing first in the Sanremo Music Festival.

In December 2018, Mahmood was one of 24 acts selected to compete in Sanremo Giovani, a televised competition aimed at selecting two newcomers as contestants of the 69th Sanremo Music Festival. Competing acts were split in two separate groups, which performed in different live shows. A winner from each group was declared, and Mahmood placed first in the second episode of the show, with his entry "Gioventù bruciata". Mahmood also received the Critics' Award among acts performing in the second final. "Soldi" was later announced as his entry for the Sanremo Music Festival 2019.

Mahmood performed the song for the first time during the first live show of the 69th Sanremo Music Festival, which was held on 5 February 2019. He was the 24th and final act to appear on stage, performing after midnight. Dario "Dardust" Faini, co-writer of the song, directed the Sanremo Orchestra during his performance. During the third live show, "Soldi" was the first performance of the night. On 8 February 2019, Mahmood performed the song in a new version, featuring rapper Gué Pequeno. During the first round of the final, "Soldi" placed 7th in the televote, but was the most voted by the experts jury, and the second most voted by the press jury. As a result, Mahmood gained a spot in the top three acts of the competition. After an additional performance, the song was declared the winner of the 69th Sanremo Music Festival, beating Ultimo's "I tuoi particolari" and "Musica che resta" by Il Volo, which placed second and third, respectively. Mahmood also received the "Enzo Jannacci" Award for Best Performance.

=== Eurovision Song Contest ===
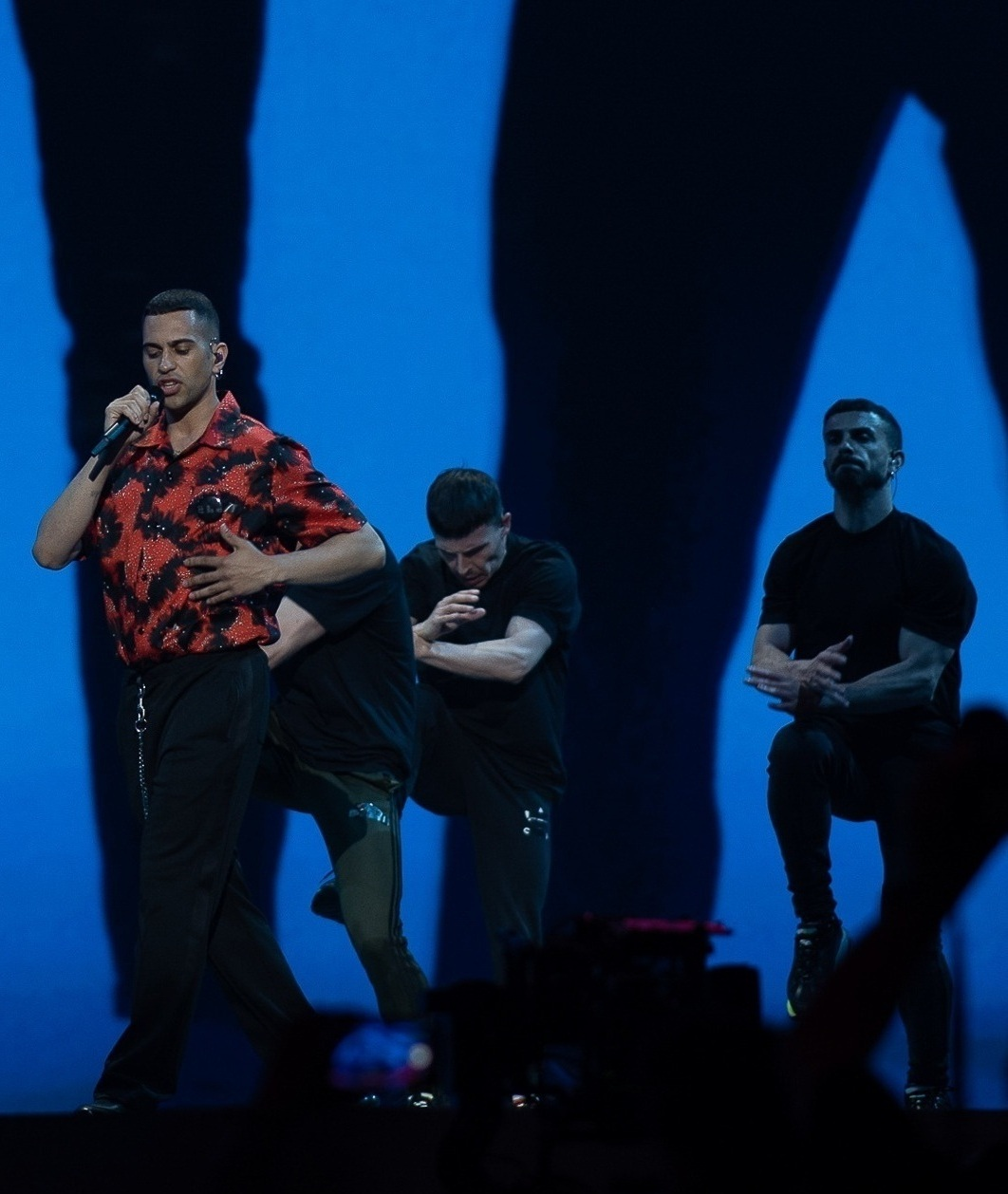
Mahmood performing "Soldi" during a Eurovision rehearsal in May 2019.

Following his win, it was confirmed by RAI and the European Broadcasting Union that Mahmood had accepted the invitation to represent Italy in the Eurovision Song Contest, which is given to the winner of the Sanremo Music Festival, and that he'd be performing "Soldi" at Eurovision. As Italy is a member of the "Big Five", he automatically advanced to the final, held on 18 May 2019 in Tel Aviv, Israel. The song finished in second place with 472 points, and won the Marcel Bezençon Composer Award.

== Music video ==
The music video for "Soldi" was directed by Attilio Cusani. As of December 2023, the video has over 206 million views on YouTube.

== Track listings ==
Digital download (Benny Benassi Remix)
No.	Title	Length
1.	"Soldi" (Benny Benassi Remix)	3:00
2.	"Soldi" (Benny Benassi Extended Version)	3:40

Digital download (Denis First Remix)
No.	Title	Length
1.	"Soldi" (Denis First Remix)	3:00

Digital download (Vigiland Remix)
No.	Title	Length
1.	"Soldi" (Vigiland Remix)	2:56

Digital download (Isac Elliot Remix)
No.	Title	Length
1.	"Soldi" (featuring Isac Elliot)	3:19

Digital download (Spanish version)
No.	Title	Length
1.	"Soldi" (featuring Maikel Delacalle)	3:04

== Charts ==
=== Weekly charts ===
Weekly chart performance for "Soldi"
Chart (2019)	Peak position
Austria (Ö3 Austria Top 40)	12
Belgium (Ultratop 50 Flanders)	50
Belgium (Ultratip Bubbling Under Wallonia)	16
Croatia (HRT)	38
Estonia (Eesti Ekspress)	2
Europe Digital Songs (Billboard)	8
France (SNEP)	67
Germany (GfK)	32
Greece (IFPI)	1
Iceland (Tónlistinn)	3
Ireland (IRMA)	65
Israel International Airplay (Media Forest)	1
Italy (FIMI)	1
Italy Airplay (EarOne)	1
Latvia (LaIPA)	21
Lithuania (AGATA)	1
Luxembourg Digital Song Sales (Billboard)	8
Netherlands (Single Top 100)	16
Norway (VG-lista)	16
Portugal (AFP)	73
Scottish Singles Sales (Official Charts)	57
Spain (Promusicae)	5
Sweden (Sverigetopplistan)	8
Switzerland (Schweizer Hitparade)	5
UK Singles (Official Charts)	73

=== Year-end charts ===
2019 year-end chart performance for "Soldi"
Chart (2019)	Position
Iceland (Tónlistinn)	31
Italy (FIMI)	4
Spain (PROMUSICAE)	38
Switzerland (Schweizer Hitparade)	27

== Certifications ==
Region	Certification	Certified units/sales
France (SNEP)	Gold	100,000^{‡}
Italy (FIMI)	4× Platinum	200,000^{‡}
Poland (ZPAV)	Gold	25,000^{‡}
Spain (Promusicae)	2× Platinum	80,000^{‡}
Streaming
Greece (IFPI Greece)	Gold	1,000,000^{†}
^{‡} Sales+streaming figures based on certification alone.^{†} Streaming-only figures based on certification alone.
