= Gioventù bruciata =

Studio album by Mahmood
- Released: 21 September 2018 (EP); 22 February 2019 (Album)
- Genre: R&B; pop
- Length: 32:01
- Label: Island
- Producer: Francesco Catitti; Ceri; Dardust; Charlie Charles; Muut

Mahmood chronology
Gioventù bruciata EP (2018)	Gioventù bruciata (2019)	Ghettolimpo (2021)

Singles from Gioventù bruciata
- 1. "Uramaki" Released: 27 April 2018; 2. "Milano Good Vibes" Released: 31 August 2018; 3. "Asia occidente" Released: 26 October 2018; 4. "Gioventù bruciata" Released: 7 December 2018; 5. "Soldi" Released: 6 February 2019

Gioventù bruciata (Italian for 'Wasted youth', also being the Italian title for Rebel Without a Cause) is the debut studio album by Italian singer-songwriter Mahmood. The album was released on Island Records on 22 February 2019. The album peaked at number one on the Italian Albums Chart. The album includes the singles "Uramaki", "Milano Good Vibes", "Asia occidente", "Gioventù bruciata" and "Soldi". Gioventù bruciata was first released as an extended play on 21 September 2018.

== Singles ==
"Uramaki" was released as the lead single from the album on 27 April 2018. The song peaked at number 86 on the Italian Singles Chart. "Milano Good Vibes" was released as the second single from the album on 31 August 2018. "Asia occidente" was released as the third single from the album on 26 October 2018. "Gioventù bruciata" was released as the fourth single from the album on 7 December 2018. The song peaked at number 40 on the Italian Singles Chart.

"Soldi" was released as the fifth and final single from the album on 6 February 2019. The song peaked at number 1 on the Italian Singles Chart, becoming his first number one single in any country. The song won the 69th Sanremo Musical Festival and represented Italy in the Eurovision Song Contest 2019 in Tel Aviv, Israel, where it reached second place.

== Track listing ==
No.	Title	Lyrics	Music	Producer(s)	Length
1.	"Soldi"	Alessandro Mahmoud; Dario Faini	Mahmoud; Faini; Paolo Alberto Monachetti	Charlie Charles; Dardust	3:15
2.	"Gioventù bruciata"	Mahmoud	Mahmoud; Stefano Ceri	Ceri	3:17
3.	"Uramaki"	Mahmoud	Francesco Fugazza; Marcello Grilli	Muut	2:56
4.	"Il Nilo nel Naviglio"	Mahmoud	Mahmoud; Francesco Catitti	Katoo	3:07
5.	"Anni 90" (featuring Fabri Fibra)	Mahmoud; Fabrizio Tarducci	Fugazza; Grilli	Muut	3:17
6.	"Asia occidente"	Mahmoud	Mahmoud; Catitti	Katoo	3:49
7.	"Remo"	Mahmoud	Mahmoud	Zef; Katoo	3:08
8.	"Milano Good Vibes"	Mahmoud	Fugazza; Grilli	Muut	2:58
9.	"Sabbie mobili"	Mahmoud	Ceri	Ceri	3:10
10.	"Mai figlio unico"	Mahmoud	Mahmoud; Ceri	Ceri	2:58
11.	"Soldi" (featuring Guè)	Mahmoud; Faini; Cosimo Fini	Mahmoud; Faini; Monachetti	Charlie Charles; Dardust	3:06

== Charts ==
=== Album ===
==== Weekly charts ====
Chart (2019)	Peak position
Estonian Albums (Eesti Tipp-40)	4
Iceland Albums (Tonlist)	24
Italian Albums (FIMI)	1
Lithuanian Albums (AGATA)	2
Norwegian Albums (VG-lista)	18
Spanish Streaming Albums (PROMUSICAE)	36
Swedish Albums (Sverigetopplistan)	34
Swiss Albums (Schweizer Hitparade)	34

==== Year-end charts ====
Chart (2019)	Position
Italian Albums (FIMI)	23

=== Extended play ===
Chart (2019)	Peak position
Italian Albums (FIMI)	6

== Certifications ==
Region	Certification	Certified units/sales
Italy (FIMI)	Platinum	50,000^{‡}
^{‡} Sales+streaming figures based on certification alone.

== Release history ==
Region	Date	Format	Label
Italy	22 February 2019	CD; digital download; streaming	Island
