= Blu (album) =

Blu¹

Studio album by Giorgia
- Released: February 17, 2023
- Genre: R&B; pop; neo soul
- Length: 26:41
- Label: Sony; Michroponica
- Producer: Big Fish; Rhade; DJ Shocca; Paolo Baldini

Giorgia chronology
Pop Heart (2018)	Blu¹ (2023)	G (2025)

Singles from Blu¹
- 1. "Normale" Released: 4 September 2022; 2. "Parole dette male" Released: 9 February 2023; 3. "Senza confine" Released: 5 May 2023

Blu (styled as Blu¹; English: Blue) is the eleventh studio album by Italian singer-songwriter Giorgia, released on 17 February 2023 by the record label Michroponica, and distributed by Sony Music.

First studio album since Oronero (2016), Blu was promoted by the single "Parole dette male" which competed at the Sanremo Music Festival 2023, placing sixth in the final ranking.

== Background ==
After the release of her tenth studio album, Oronero (2016), Giorgia took a hiatus from recording, with the exception of the cover album Pop Heart in 2018. The following years the Giorgia suffered artistic and personal problems, also due to the depart by some of her longtime collaborators from Sony Music to Warner Music Italy amid managerial disputes. Giorgia also said that she had encountered difficulties in writing and interpreting new songs, and that her artistic inspirations had led her to consider retiring.

In 2022, Giorgia collaborated on Mara Sattei's song "Parentesi", and on the song "Luglio" featured on Elisa's album Ritorno al futuro/Back to the Future. In September 2022, she sang an unreleased song wrtitten by Francesca Michielin "Tornerai", confirming that she has returned to work on a new recording project.

== Composition and artwork ==
Blu is composed of nine tracks, four of which were written by Giorgia herself, produced by Big Fish and Rhade, marking Giorgia's first project not produced by Michele Canova. Numerous authors and producers took part in the project, including Elisa, Francesca Michielin, Mahmood, Jake La Furia, Dario Faini, Ghemon and Gemitaiz. In an interview for IO Donna, Giorgia explained the meaning and choice of the album title:

"I chose Blu at the end, noticing that in every new song there is a word that takes you to the sky. I kept repeating to myself: “Look up!” We are used to looking down, but if we look up for a moment, we realize that there is more, that we don't end here, that we are not just this body, this mind. Emotions, sometimes bastards: if they control you, they ruin you, they are the tool to find a different point of view and from there improve a little bit, evolve."

The artwork for the project was designed by stylist and creative director Maria Grazia Chiuri, inspired by Leonardo da Vinci's Vitruvian Man. The concept places a woman at the center between earth and sky, dressed in a gown designed by Chiuri herself that reproduces the constellations with gold sequin embroidery. Her hair is styled back, reminiscent of David Bowie, who is also often associated with astral imagery.

== Critical reception ==
Mattia Marzi of Rockol stated that with this project, the singer has "rediscovered her R&B and soul roots", appreciating the ability of songwriters and producers to have "helped the singer recover her teenage influences and update them". Marzi defined it as an "uncompromising album" in which "Giorgia follows her own path, trying to be both classic and contemporary at the same time",” associating it with the singer's 2003 album, Ladra di vento. Gabriele Fazio of Agenzia Giornalistica Italia wrote that the album is "mature" and "refined", although not "immediately accessible" to the public, emphasizing that "Giorgia has achieved such artistic status that she can't just sit there and depend on the moods of kids who listen to trap music".

== Track listing ==
Blu¹ – Track listing
No.	Title	Lyrics	Music	Producer(s)	Length
1.	"Meccaniche celesti"	Giorgia Todrani	Todrani; Massimiliano Dagani; Mario Fracchiola	Big Fish; Rhade	3:11
2.	"Normale"	Alessandro Mahmoud; Riccardo Schiara	Dario Faini; Dagani; Fracchiola	Big Fish	3:14
3.	"Atacama"	Silvia Cesana; Iacopo Sinigaglia	Sinigaglia; Dagani; Fracchiola	Big Fish; Rhade	2:52
4.	"Parole dette male"	Alberto Bianco; Francesco Roccati	Bianco; Roccati; Dagani; Fracchiola	Big Fish; Rhade	3:06
5.	"Senza confine"	Todrani; Elisa Toffoli	Toffoli; Faini; Vanni Casagrande; Dagani; Fracchiola	Big Fish; Rhade	2:46
6.	"Sì o no"	Francesco Vigorelli; Jacopo Ettorre	Ettorre; Paolo Baldini; Dagani	Big Fish; Paolo Baldini; DJ Shocca	2:27
7.	"Se"	Todrani	Todrani	Big Fish; Rhade	2:53
8.	"Ogni chance che hai" (featuring Gemitaiz)	Todrani; Davide De Luca; Ettorre; Giovanni Cassano	Todrani; Ettorre; Dagani; Fracchiola	Big Fish; Rhade; DJ Shocca	3:06
9.	"Tornerai"	Todrani; Francesca Michielin; Giovanni Luca Picariello	Todrani; Michielin; Picariello; Edoardo Maggioni; Andrea Piras; Dagani	Big Fish; Piras; Maggioni	3:01
Total length:					26:41

== Charts ==
Weekly chart performance for Blu¹
Chart (2023)	Peak position
Italian Albums (FIMI)	12
