= Uramaki (song) =

Single by Mahmood

from the album Gioventù bruciata
- Released: 27 April 2018
- Genre: R&B
- Length: 2:56
- Label: Island
- Songwriters: Alessandro Mahmoud; Marcello Grilli; Francesco Fugazza
- Producer: Mutt

Mahmood singles chronology
"Pesos" (2017)	"Uramaki" (2018)	"Milano Good Vibes" (2018)

Music video
- "Uramaki" on YouTube

"Uramaki" is a song by Italian singer Mahmood. It was released on 27 April 2018, as the lead single from his debut studio album, Gioventù bruciata (2019). Mahmood co-wrote the song with Francesco Fugazza and Marcello Grilli, the latter also produced it under the name Mutt. It debuted at number 86 on the Italian Singles Chart in February 2019, after the release of the album.

== Music video ==
Directed by Martina Pastori, the music video for "Uramaki" was shot in Chinatown, Milan. It premiered on 2 May 2018, via Mahmood's YouTube channel.

== Charts ==
Chart (2019)	Peak position
Italy (FIMI)	86
