= Diego Mancino =

Italian singer-songwriter and musician

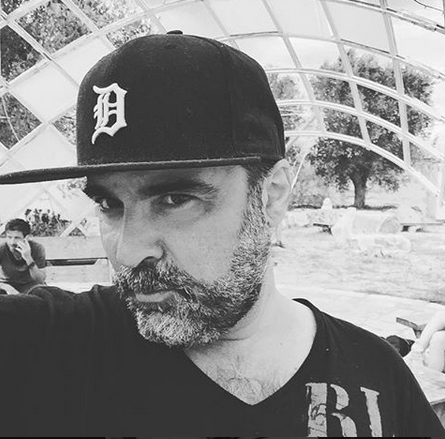

Background information
- Born: 13 October 1970 (age 55); Milano
- Genres: Pop; rock; soundtrack
- Occupations: Musician; singer-songwriter; composer; record producer
- Instruments: Piano; guitar
- Years active: 1990–present
- Label: Sugar Music Italy
- Website: http://www.sugarmusic.com/it/artisti-autori/diego-mancino

Diego Mancino (born 13 October 1970) is an Italian musician and singer-songwriter.

== Early career ==
During the 90s he graduated at a theatrical school in Milan, and he dedicated his time to music, playing in punk and rock bands.

In 1994 he became part of the English band "Solar Flares" in Birmingham, he took part in concerts and recordings in England, most of which were not released.

After this experience he returned to Italy and started writing and creating musical projects with a different conception of sound. He founded a group called "L’Instabile" and often hosted friends on stage, such as Rocco Tanica (Elio e le storie tese) and "Bluvertigo". In 1999 he began a soloist project, My Virginità, set aside in 2000.

== Career as an author and soloist ==
Diego Mancino began his career as a singer songwriter after he decided to set aside the harsh sound that had marked his previous work. In 2005 he published the album "Cose che cambiano tutto", which received many praises from specialized critics.

In 2006 he recorded the piece "Idee stupide" with Fabri Fibra, part of the rapper's album "Tradimento".

In 2008 he published his second album "L'evidenza". In 2011 he wrote the music and lyrics of the single "Odio tutti i cantanti" with Matteo Buzzanca as he was also one of the authors of the lyrics in Musa from Noemi's album "Rosso Noemi". The same year he also worked with Daniele Silvestri for the piece "Acqua Che Scorre" from the album "S.C.O.T.C.H.”

He also worked on the album "Acrobati" in the piece "L'Orologio".

In 2012 he participated to the Festival di Sanremo as the author of the piece "La Tua Bellezza" (written with Dario Faini) sang by Francesco Renga. He also wrote the piece "La felicità" from Nina Zilli's album "L'amore è femmina".

In 2012 he published his third album "È necessario".

In 2014 he participated in the "Festival di Sanremo" by writing "Un uomo è un albero" for Noemi and "Il cielo è vuoto" for Cristiano De André.

In 2015 he co-signed two pieces from Emma’s album "Adesso": "Quando le canzoni finiranno" and "Il Paradiso Non esiste". "Il Paradiso Non esiste" was chosen as the single to promote the album in the Summer of 2016.

In 2016 he also published his fourth album "Un Invito A Te" with Universal Music as his label. He wrote "il mondo non lo sa più fare", "la Gigantessa" and "il resto del mondo" for Giusy Ferreri's album and for the Bluebeaters' music project he wrote "Tempo" and for Chiara Civello's record "Come vanno le cose" and "Qualcuno come te".

In 2017 he worked on the soundtrack for the movie "Finché c'è prosecco c'è speranza" and he signed part of the music and the song "Avere ragione" with Stefano Brandoni.

== Discography ==
=== band album ===
- 1990: Mary Quant – Georg (self-production)
- 1993: Achtung Banditi – Achtung Banditi (UPR/Sony Music)
- 1994: Achtung Banditi – Odio e devozione (UPR/Sony Music)
- 1998: L'instabile – Alieno seriale (self-production)
- 1998: Solar Flares – Solar Flares (self-production)

=== soloist album ===
- 2000: Piume (unreleased album)
- 2005: Cose che cambiano tutto
- 2008: L'evidenza
- 2012: È necessario
- 2016: Un invito a te

=== singles ===
- 2004: Cose che cambiano tutto
- 2005: Strana l'estate
- 2005: Un giorno perfetto
- 2008: Tutte le distanze
- 2008: Milano e l'impossibile
- 2008: A parte te
- 2012: Come dei ragazzi
- 2012: Colpa della musica
- 2012: Nei baci no
- 2016: Succede d'estate

== Collaborations ==
- Fabri Fibra – Idee stupide
- Roberto Dell’Era (Afterhours) – Ami lei o ami me
- DJ Myke – Il male è banale
- DJ Aladyn – Io te e la strada
- Rancore – Paranoie
- Barbara Cavalleri – Invece tu (as songwriter)
- Enrico Ruggeri – Rien ne va plus
- Max Zanotti (Deasonika) – Spasimo (project Rezophonic)
- Daniele Silvestri – Acqua che scorre (canzone inserita nell'album S.C.O.T.C.H.) and L'Orologio ( album titled Acrobati)
- Noemi – Odio tutti i cantanti, Musa (co-signed with Matteo Buzzanca music and lyric) (album titled RossoNoemi)
- Francesco Renga – La tua bellezza, Senza sorridere (co-signed with Dario Faini) (album titled Fermoimmagine)
- Nina Zilli – La felicità (as songwriter) (album titled L'amore è femmina)
- Chiara – Qualcosa da fare (co-signed with Dario Faini) ) (album titled Un posto nel mondo)
- Cristiano De André – La stanchezza (album titled Come in cielo così in guerra)
- Reset! – Il Tesoro (album titled Future Madness, sung with Gué Pequeno)
