= Moonlight popolare =

Single by Mahmood and Massimo Pericolo
- Released: 14 May 2020
- Genre: Pop rap
- Length: 3:35
- Label: Island
- Songwriters: Alessandro Mahmoud; Alessandro Vanetti; Francesco Barbaglia
- Producer: Crookers

Mahmood singles chronology
"Rapide" (2020)	"Moonlight popolare" (2020)	"Dorado" (2020)

Massimo Pericolo singles chronology
"Criminali" (2019)	"Moonlight popolare" (2020)	"Beretta" (2020)

"Moonlight popolare" is a song written and recorded by Italian singer Mahmood and Italian rapper Massimo Pericolo. It was released for digital download on 14 May 2020 by Island Records. The song peaked at number three on the Italian Singles Chart.

== Background ==
On his Instagram account, Mahmood said, "Since I was a child I have always had big dreams, with the certainty that some of these were too big for one in southern Milan. I was never afraid to tell what I saw from my bedroom window, but after all I understood that the moon can be looked at well even from a council house. I am overjoyed to have collaborated with Vane who I consider one of the best new rappers on the scene."

== Music video ==
A music video to accompany the release of "Moonlight popolare" was first released onto YouTube on 22 May 2020.

== Personnel ==
Credits adapted from Tidal.

- Crookers – producer
- Francesco Barbaglia – composer
- Alessandro Mahmoud – associated performer, author, vocals
- Massimo Pericolo – associated performer, author, vocals

== Charts ==
Chart performance of "Moonlight popolare"
Chart (2020)	Peak position
Italy (FIMI)	3
