= Zero (Mahmood song) =

Single by Mahmood

from the album Ghettolimpo
- Released: 21 April 2021
- Genre: Trap-pop; R&B
- Length: 4:17
- Label: Island
- Songwriters: Alessandro Mahmoud; Davide Petrella; Dario Faini
- Producer: Dardust

Mahmood singles chronology
"Inuyasha" (2021)	"Zero" (2021)	"Klan" (2021)

Music video
- "Zero" on YouTube

"Zero" is a song co-written and recorded by Italian singer Mahmood. It was released for digital download for streaming on 21 April 2021 by Island Records as the fourth single from the singer's second studio album Ghettolimpo. The song was written by Alessandro Mahmoud, Davide Petrella and Dardust, and produced by Dardust.

The song was featured on the soundtrack of Netflix's series Zero

== Personnel ==
Credits adapted from Tidal.

- Dardust – producer and composer
- Davide Petrella – author
- Mahmood – associated performer, author, vocals

== Track listing ==
Digital download
No.	Title	Producer(s)	Length
1.	"Zero"	Dardust	4:17

== Charts ==
Chart performance of "Zero"
Chart (2021)	Peak position
Italy (FIMI)	44
