= Rubini (song) =

Single by Mahmood featuring Elisa

from the album Ghettolimpo
- Released: 27 August 2021
- Genre: R&B; trap
- Length: 3:48
- Label: Island
- Songwriters: Alessandro Mahmoud; Elisa Toffoli; Dario Faini
- Producer: Dardust

Mahmood singles chronology
"Klan" (2021)	"Rubini" (2021)	"Brividi" (2022)

Elisa singles chronology
"Volente o nolente" (2020)	"Rubini" (2021)	"Seta" (2021)

Music video
- "Rubini" (Visual) on YouTube

"Rubini" (lit. 'Rubies') is a song written and recorded by Italian singer Mahmood with guest vocals by Italian singer Elisa. It was released on 27 August 2021 through Island Records, as the sixth and final single of Mahmood's second studio album Ghettolimpo.

== Background and composition ==
The song, written and composed by the singer-songwriter with Elisa, tells the story of Mahmood's youth seen through the eyes of an adult: a troubled time in the family, the first relationships, the first adventures with friends.

Mahmood spoke about the creative process behind Elisa's composition:

"Elisa is one of the Italian artists I hold most dear to my heart and for whom I have immense respect and thanks to whom I have learned a lot. This collaboration is so important to me that it is the piece I have worked on the most, because I wanted it to be perfect. I immediately fell in love with the draft of Elisa's lyrics: I immediately began to put my head to it, reworking it with added lyrics, a new intro and adding dreamy guitars in the chorus."

Elisa spoke about the meaning of the collaboration:

"For me, Alessandro is one of the most brilliant writers on the new Italian scene, and the fact that he fell in love with my first draft of this song was great. He then entered the song magnificently. I felt a space-time bridge between us, an energy that unites us in our love of research and contemporaneity."

== Personnel ==
Credits adapted from Tidal.

- Dardust – producer, composer
- Mahmood – associated performer, author, vocals
- Elisa – associated performer, author, vocals

== Charts ==
Chart performance of "Rubini"
Chart (2021)	Peak position
Italy (FIMI)	31
Italy (EarOne Airplay)	4
San Marino (SMRRTV Top 50)	3

== Certifications ==
Region	Certification	Certified units/sales
Italy (FIMI)	Platinum	100,000^{‡}
^{‡} Sales+streaming figures based on certification alone.
