= Klan (song) =

Single by Mahmood

from the album Ghettolimpo
- Released: 14 May 2021
- Genre: R&B; hip hop
- Length: 2:59
- Label: Island
- Songwriters: Alessandro Mahmoud; Davide Petrella; Xavier Pérez; Marc Seguí; Dario Faini
- Producer: Dardust

Mahmood singles chronology
"Zero" (2021)	"Klan" (2021)	"Rubini" (2021)

Music video
- "Klan" on YouTube

"Klan" is a song by Italian singer Mahmood. It was released for digital download and streaming on 14 May 2021 by Island Records as the fifth single from the singer's second studio album Ghettolimpo. The song was written by Mahmood with co-writing contribution by Davide Petrella, Marc Seguí and Xavibo, and composed and produced by Dardust.

== Music video ==
A music video to accompany the release of "Klan" was first released onto YouTube on 19 May 2021. The video was directed by Attilio Cusani and shot in Palermo and at "Fiumara d'arte" open-air museum in the Metropolitan City of Messina, Sicily.

== Personnel ==
Credits adapted from Tidal.

- Dardust – associate performer, producer, composer, drum machine
- Davide Petrella – author
- Mahmood – associated performer, author, vocals
- Marc Seguí – author
- Xavibo – author

== Track listing ==
Digital download
No.	Title	Producer(s)	Length
1.	"Klan" (featuring DRD)	Dardust	2:59

== Charts ==
Chart performance of "Klan"
Chart (2021)	Peak position
Italy (FIMI)	42
San Marino (SMRRTV Top 50)	27

== Certifications ==
Region	Certification	Certified units/sales
Italy (FIMI)	Gold	35,000^{‡}
^{‡} Sales+streaming figures based on certification alone.
