= Ghettolimpo =

Studio album by Mahmood
- Released: 11 June 2021
- Genre: Electropop; avant-pop
- Length: 49:24
- Label: Island
- Producer: Dardust; Muut; Katoo; Woodkid

Mahmood chronology
Gioventù bruciata (2019)	Ghettolimpo (2021)	Nei letti degli altri (2024)

Singles from Ghettolimpo
- 1. "Rapide" Released: 16 January 2020; 2. "Dorado" Released: 10 July 2020; 3. "Inuyasha" Released: 3 February 2021; 4. "Zero" Released: 21 April 2021; 5. "Klan" Released: 14 May 2021; 6. "Rubini" Released: 27 August 2021

Ghettolimpo (a portmanteau of 'ghetto' and 'Olimpo', Italian for Olympus) is the second studio album by Italian singer-songwriter Mahmood. The album was released on 11 June 2021 and was preceded by the singles "Rapide", "Dorado", "Inuyasha", "Zero", and "Klan".

== Track listing ==
Ghettolimpo track listing
No.	Title	Lyrics	Music	Producer(s)	Length
1.	"Dei"	Alessandro Mahmoud	Francesco Fugazza; Marcello Grilli	Muut	2:23
2.	"Ghettolimpo"	Mahmoud	Fugazza; Grilli	Muut	3:54
3.	"Inuyasha"	Mahmoud	Dario Faini	Dardust	3:54
4.	"Kobra"	Mahmoud	Faini; Francesco Catitti	Dardust; Katoo	3:00
5.	"Baci dalla Tunisia"	Mahmoud	Faini; Josh Rosinet	Dardust	4:00
6.	"Klan"	Mahmoud; Davide Petrella; Marc Seguí	Faini	Dardust	2:59
7.	"Zero"	Mahmoud; Petrella	Faini	Dardust	4:17
8.	"Rubini" (featuring Elisa)	Mahmoud; Elisa Toffoli	Faini	Dardust	3:48
9.	"Dorado" (featuring Sfera Ebbasta and Feid)	Mahmoud; Petrella; Christian Senra Bértolo; Gionata Boschetti; Salomón Villada Hoyos	Faini	Dardust	2:58
10.	"Talata"	Mahmoud	Faini	Dardust	3:08
11.	"T'amo"	Mahmoud; Salvatore Sini	Fugazza; Grilli; Giuseppe Rachel	Muut	4:32
12.	"Karma" (featuring Woodkid)	Mahmoud	Yoann Lemoine	Woodkid	3:33
13.	"Rapide"	Mahmoud	Faini; Catitti	Dardust	4:03
14.	"Icaro è libero"	Mahmoud; Alfredo Rapetti	Catitti	Katoo	2:55
Total length:					49:24

== Charts ==
=== Weekly charts ===
Weekly chart performance for Ghettolimpo
Chart (2021)	Peak position
Italian Albums (FIMI)	2
Spanish Albums (PROMUSICAE)	80
Swiss Albums (Schweizer Hitparade)	24

=== Year-end charts ===
Year-end chart performance for Ghettolimpo
Chart (2022)	Position
Italian Albums (FIMI)	99

== Certifications ==
Certifications for Ghettolimpo
Region	Certification	Certified units/sales
Italy (FIMI)	Platinum	50,000^{‡}
^{‡} Sales+streaming figures based on certification alone.

== Year-end lists ==
Select year-end rankings of Ghettolimpo
Publication	List	Rank	Ref.
Panorama	The 20 Best Italian Albums of 2021	14	
Rolling Stone	The 20 Best Italian Albums of 2021	10	
