= Massimo Pericolo =

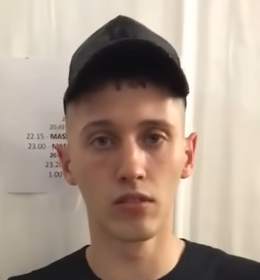
- Massimo Pericolo

Background information
- Born: Alessandro Vanetti; 30 November 1992 (age 33); Gallarate, Lombardy, Italy
- Genres: Trap; hip hop
- Occupation: Rapper
- Years active: 2016–present
- Labels: Sony Music

Alessandro Vanetti (born 30 November 1992), known professionally as Massimo Pericolo (lit. 'Maximum Danger'), is an Italian rapper.

In April 2019, he debuted with the studio album Scialla semper, which peaked at number 4 of the FIMI albums chart. In 2020, he featured in Mahmood's song "Moonlight popolare". His studio albums Solo tutto (2021) and Le cose cambiano (2023) topped the Italian chart. Also, his 2023 track "Moneylove" ended up going #1 on the singles chart in Italy.

== Discography ==
=== Studio albums ===
- Scialla semper (2019)
- Solo tutto (2021)
- Le cose cambiano (2023)
