= Gioventù bruciata (song) =

Single by Mahmood

from the album Gioventù bruciata
- Released: 7 December 2018
- Genre: R&B
- Length: 3:17
- Label: Island
- Songwriters: Alessandro Mahmoud; Stefano Ceri
- Producer: Ceri

Mahmood singles chronology
"Asia occidente" (2018)	"Gioventù bruciata" (2018)	"Soldi" (2019)

"Gioventù bruciata" (Italian for 'Wasted youth', also being the Italian title for Rebel Without a Cause) is a song by Italian singer Mahmood. It was released on 7 December 2018 by Island Records, as the fourth single from his debut studio album, Gioventù bruciata (2019). The song was written by Alessandro Mahmoud and Stefano Ceri. It peaked at number 40 on the Italian Singles Chart.

== Music video ==
A music video to accompany the release of "Gioventù bruciata" was first released onto YouTube on 13 December 2018 at a total length of three minutes and seventeen seconds.

== Charts ==
Chart (2019)	Peak position
Italy (FIMI)	40

== Certifications ==
Region	Certification	Certified units/sales
Italy (FIMI)	Gold	35,000^{‡}
^{‡} Sales+streaming figures based on certification alone.

== Release history ==
Region	Date	Format	Label
Italy	7 December 2018	Digital download	Island
