= Calipso (song) =

2019 single by Charlie Charles and Dardust

Single by Charlie Charles and Dardust featuring Sfera Ebbasta, Mahmood and Fabri Fibra
- Released: 26 April 2019
- Genre: Dance-pop; urban
- Length: 3:10
- Label: Island
- Songwriters: Davide Petrella; Gionata Boschetti; Alessandro Mahmoud; Fabrizio Tarducci; Paolo Alberto Monachetti; Dario Faini
- Producers: Charlie Charles; Dardust

Charlie Charles singles chronology
"Peace & Love" (2018)	"Calipso" (2019)	"Cheyenne" (2019)

Dardust singles chronology
"Sublime" (2018)	"Calipso" (2019)	"Prisma" (2019)

Sfera Ebbasta singles chronology
"Cabriolet" (2019)	"Calipso" (2019)	"Soldi in nero" (2019)

Mahmood singles chronology
"Soldi" (2019)	"Calipso" (2019)	"Barrio" (2019)

Fabri Fibra singles chronology
"Chi vuol essere milionario?" (2019)	"Calipso" (2019)	"Yoshi" (2019)

Music video
- "Calipso" on YouTube

"Calipso" is a song by Italian music producers Charlie Charles and Dardust featuring guest vocals by Italian recording artists Sfera Ebbasta, Mahmood and Fabri Fibra. It was released on 26 April 2019 by Island Records. The song peaked at number 1 on the Italian Singles Chart.

== Background and composition ==
The song was written by Davide Petrella, Dardust, Fabri Fibra, Mahmood, Sfera Ebbasta and Charlie Charles. Its release was preceded by a series of teasers through Charlie Charles' social network accounts. Its title and featured artists were announced on 23 April 2019, three days before its release.

Charlie Charles described "Calipso" as "a metaphor to tell how easy it is to let yourself be tempted by the wrong roads when you are a kid which starts from the suburbs, and how easy it is to negatively judge who comes from nothing".

== Music video ==
The music video for "Calipso", directed by Attilio Cusani, premiered on 15 May 2019 via Charlie Charles' YouTube channel.

== Charts ==
Chart (2019)	Peak position
Italy (FIMI)	1
San Marino Airplay (SMRTV Top 50)	16

== Certifications ==
Region	Certification	Certified units/sales
Italy (FIMI)	4× Platinum	200,000^{‡}
^{‡} Sales+streaming figures based on certification alone.

== Release history ==
Region	Date	Format	Label
Italy	26 April 2019	Digital download; streaming	Island
Italy	14 June 2019	7-inch Limited Edition	Universal Music Italia
