= Inuyasha (song) =

Single by Mahmood

from the album Ghettolimpo
- Released: 2 February 2021
- Genre: R&B
- Length: 3:54
- Label: Island
- Songwriters: Alessandro Mahmoud; Dario Faini
- Producer: Dardust

Mahmood singles chronology
"Dorado" (2020)	"Inuyasha" (2021)	"Zero" (2021)

Music video
- "Inuyasha" on YouTube

"Inuyasha" is a song written and recorded by Italian singer Mahmood. It was released for digital download for streaming on 2 February 2021 by Island Records as the third single from the singer's second studio album Ghettolimpo. The song peaked at number twenty-one on the Italian Singles Chart. It was written by Mahmood and composed and produced by Dardust.

== Critical reception ==
Jonathan Vautrey of Wiwibloggs wrote, "Mahmood has never made secret his love for things such as Pokémon and anime. And now, the Italian star is bringing that into his music. His new single is titled “Inuyasha”, which is the name of a manga/anime series centred around a half-dog demon, half-human character called Inuyasha. The Eurovision 2019 runner-up dresses as his own version of Inuyasha, with a bit of Italian fashion flair. Sonically, the track is a strong mid-tempo hip-hop offering that Mahmood takes further with his passion and charisma."

== Music video ==
A music video to accompany the release of "Inuyasha" was first released onto YouTube on 5 February 2021. The video was directed by Simone Rovellini.

== Personnel ==
Credits adapted from Tidal.

- Dardust – producer and composer
- Mahmood – associated performer, author, vocals

== Charts ==
Chart performance of "Inuyasha"
Chart (2021)	Peak position
Italy (FIMI)	21
San Marino (SMRRTV Top 50)	29

== Certifications ==
Region	Certification	Certified units/sales
Italy (FIMI)	Platinum	70,000^{‡}
^{‡} Sales+streaming figures based on certification alone.
