= Dario Faini =

Dardust
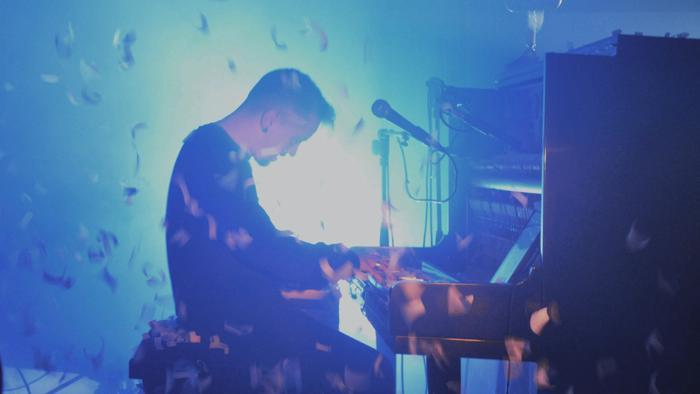
- Faini performing in Ascoli Piceno in 2015

Background information
- Also known as: DRD
- Born: Dario Faini; 17 March 1976 (age 49); Ascoli Piceno, Italy
- Occupations: Record producer; songwriter
- Instrument: Piano

Dario Faini (born 17 March 1976), known professionally as Dardust or DRD, is an Italian songwriter, record producer and pianist. He composed songs for several recording artists, including Marco Mengoni, Francesco Renga, Emma, Annalisa, Thegiornalisti, Giusy Ferreri, Levante, Elodie, Fabri Fibra, Ermal Meta and Rancore.

In 2019, he co-wrote and co-produced the song "Soldi" for Mahmood, with which he won the 69th Sanremo Music Festival. Faini also conducted the orchestra during Mahmood's performance. After placing second in the Eurovision Song Contest 2019, "Soldi" also became a hit in Europe.

During his career, he also released a trilogy of instrumental albums, composed of 7 (2015), Birth (2016) and S.A.D. Storms and Drugs. As a lead artist, he released the hit singles "Calipso" (2019), produced with Charlie Charles and performed by Mahmood, Fabri Fibra and Sfera Ebbasta, and "Defuera" (2020), with vocals by Ghali, Marracash and Madame. He performed in the first semi-final of the Eurovision Song Contest 2022 in Turin as an interval act alongside Benny Benassi and Sophie and the Giants.

Faini co-authored "Fighter", with which Tali represented Luxembourg in the Eurovision Song Contest 2024, as well as "La noia", the winning song of the Sanremo Music Festival 2024, with which Angelina Mango represented Italy.

== Discography ==
=== Studio albums ===
- 7 (2015)
- Birth (2016)
- Slow Is (2017)
- S.A.D. Storm and Drugs (2020)
- Duality (2022)

=== EPs ===
- 7 Remixed (2015)
- The New Loud (2017)
- S.A.D. (Piano Solo) (2020)
- 001 Coordinate (2022)
- 002 Hymns (2022)
- 003 Horizons (2022)
- 004 Fluidity (2022)

== Production and songwriting credits ==
List of songs produced or written/co-written by Dario Faini and performed by other artists
Title	Year	Artist	Album
"Le tue parole" (Written by Irene Grandi and Dario Faini – prod: Nicolò Fragile)	2007	Irene Grandi	Irenegrandi.hits
"Punto di domanda" (Written by Antonio Galbiati and Dario Faini – prod: Dado Parisini)	2010	Alessandra Amoroso	Il mondo in un secondo
"Il mondo in un secondo" (Written by Antonio Galbiati and Dario Faini – prod: Dado Parisini)	2010	Alessandra Amoroso	Il mondo in un secondo
"Semplicemente così" (Written by Antonio Galbiati and Dario Faini – prod: Dado Parisini)	2010	Alessandra Amoroso	Il mondo in un secondo
"Il cuore non dimentica" (Written by Antonio Galbiati and Dario Faini – prod: Paolo Carta)	2010	Marco Carta	Il cuore muove
"Con le nuvole" (Written by Roberto Casalino and Dario Faini – prod: Pino Perris)	2010	Emma	A me piace così
"Dimmi che senso ha" (Written by Antonio Galbiati and Dario Faini – prod: Pino Perris)	2010	Emma	A me piace così
"Petali" (Written by Antonio Galbiati and Dario Faini – prod: Pino Perris)	2010	Emma	A me piace così
"Nelle mie favole" (Written by Antonio Galbiati and Dario Faini)	2011	Diana Del Bufalo	Non-album single
"Pioggia cadrà" (Written by Massimo Greco and Dario Faini – prod: Mara Maionchi)	2011	Antonino Spadaccino	Costellazioni
"Ovest" (Written by Massimo Greco and Dario Faini – prod: Mara Maionchi)	2011	Antonino Spadaccino	Costellazioni
"Cado giù" (Written by Roberto Casalino and Dario Faini – prod: Dado Parisini)	2011	Annalisa	Nali
"Inverno" (Written by Dario Faini – prod: Dado Parisini)	2011	Annalisa	Nali
"Dove finisce la notte" (Written by Antonio Galbiati and Dario Faini – prod: Dado Parisini)	2011	Emma	Sarò libera
"Protagonista" (Written by Andrea Amati and Dario Faini – prod: Dado Parisini)	2011	Emma	Sarò libera
"Com'è semplice" (Written by Roberto Casalino and Dario Faini)	2011	Francesca Nicolì	Kekka
"Improvvisamente piove" (Written by Dario Faini)	2011	Francesca Nicolì	Kekka
"Quante volte" (Written by Andrea Amati and Dario Faini)	2011	Francesca Nicolì	Kekka
"Dentro me" (Written by Dario Faini)	2011	Luca Napolitano	Fino a tre
"Risvegli" (Written by Massimo Greco and Dario Faini)	2011	Luca Napolitano	Fino a tre
"La tua bellezza" (Written by Francesco Renga, Diego Mancino and Dario Faini)	2012	Francesco Renga	Fermoimmagine
"Senza sorridere" (Written by Francesco Renga, Diego Mancino and Dario Faini)	2012	Francesco Renga	Fermoimmagine
"La mail che non ti ho scritto" (Written by Giulia Anania, Dario Faini and Emiliano Cecere)	2012	Giulia Anania	Giulia Anania
"La bella stagione" (Written by Giulia Anania and Dario Faini)	2012	Giulia Anania	Giulia Anania
"Non cambiare mai" (Written by Giulia Anania and Dario Faini – prod: Dado Parisini)	2012	Annalisa	Mentre tutto cambia
"Lucciole" (Written by Andrea Amati and Dario Faini – prod: Dado Parisini)	2012	Annalisa	Mentre tutto cambia
"Ottovolante" (Written by Antonio Galbiati and Dario Faini – prod: Dado Parisini)	2012	Annalisa	Mentre tutto cambia
"Ancora una volta" (Written by Roberto Casalino and Dario Faini – prod: Dado Parisini)	2012	Annalisa	Mentre tutto cambia
"Tra due minuti è primavera" (Written by Roberto Kunstler and Dario Faini – prod: Dado Parisini)	2012	Annalisa	Mentre tutto cambia
"Per te" (Written by Roberto Casalino and Dario Faini – prod: Dado Parisini)	2012	Annalisa	Mentre tutto cambia
"Prato di orchidee" (Written by Roberto Casalino and Dario Faini – prod: Dado Parisini)	2012	Annalisa	Mentre tutto cambia
"Chiudi gli occhi" (Written by Antonio Galbiati and Dario Faini – prod: Dado Parisini)	2012	Marco Carta	Necessità lunatica
"Non sarà lo stesso" (Written by Roberto Casalino and Dario Faini)	2012	Valeria Romitelli	Non-album single
"Scintille" (Written by Antonio Galbiati and Dario Faini – prod: Davide Graziano)	2013	Annalisa	Non so ballare
"Alice e il blu" (Written by Dario Faini – prod: Davide Graziano)	2013	Annalisa	Non so ballare
"Ed è ancora settembre" (Written by Andrea Amati, Fabio Campedelli, Dario Faini and Emiliano Cecere – prod: Davide Graziano)	2013	Annalisa	Non so ballare
"Spara amore mio" (Written by Ermal Meta and Dario Faini – prod: Davide Graziano)	2013	Annalisa	Non so ballare
"Meraviglioso addio" (Written by Fabio Campedelli and Dario Faini – prod: Davide Graziano)	2013	Annalisa	Non so ballare
"Vieni con me" (Written by Ermal Meta and Dario Faini – prod: Vasco Rossi)	2013	Chiara Galiazzo	Un posto nel mondo
"Qualcosa da fare" (Written by Diego Mancino and Dario Faini – prod: Carlo Ubaldo Rossi)	2013	Chiara Galiazzo	Un posto nel mondo
"In ogni angolo di me" (Written by Emma Marrone, Alessandro Raina and Dario Faini – prod: Brando)	2013	Emma	Schiena
"Se rinasci" (Written by Niccolò Agliardi and Dario Faini – prod: Brando)	2013	Emma	Schiena
"Non me ne accorgo" (Written by Marco Mengoni, Piero Romitelli and Dario Faini – prod: Michele Canova)	2013	Marco Mengoni	prontoacorrere
"Ricomincio da me" (Written by Piero Romitelli and Dario Faini – prod: Alessio Bernabei)	2014	Dear Jack	Domani è un altro film (prima parte)
"Se tu fossi qui" (Written by Diego Mancino and Dario Faini – prod: Noemi and Charlie Rapino)	2014	Noemi	Made in London
"Un uomo è un albero" (Written by Veronica Scopelliti, Diego Mancino and Dario Faini – prod: Noemi and Charlie Rapino)	2014	Noemi	Made in London
"Un lungo inverno" (Written by Francesco Renga, Dario Faini, Diego Mancino and Andrea Ragazzetti – prod: Michele Canova)	2014	Francesco Renga	Tempo reale
"L'impossibile" (Written by Francesco Renga, Dario Faini, Diego Mancino and Andrea Ragazzetti – prod: Michele Canova)	2014	Francesco Renga	Tempo reale
"Dovrebbe essere così" (Written by Francesco Renga, Dario Faini, Diego Mancino and Andrea Ragazzetti – prod: Michele Canova)	2014	Francesco Renga	Tempo reale
"Sempre sarai" (Written by Moreno Donadoni, Ermal Meta, Dario Faini and Alessandro Merli – prod: Takagi)	2014	Moreno and Fiorella Mannoia	Incredibile
"Ti porto a cena con me" (Written by Roberto Casalino and Dario Faini – prod: Christian Rigano)	2014	Giusy Ferreri	L'attesa
"Il cielo è vuoto" (Written by Cristiano De André, Diego Mancino and Dario Faini – prod: Davide Rossi)	2014	Cristiano De André	Come in cielo così in guerra
"Magnifico" (Written by Federico Lucia, Roberto Casalino and Dario Faini – prod: Twice as Nice)	2015	Fedez featuring Francesca Michielin	Pop-Hoolista
"Posizione fatale" (Written by Annalisa Scarrone and Dario Faini – prod: Kekko Silvestre)	2015	Annalisa	Splende
"Io ti aspetto" (Written by Marco Mengoni, Ermal Meta, Dario Faini and Michele Canova – prod: Michele Canova)	2015	Marco Mengoni	Parole in circolo
"La neve prima che cada" (Written by Marco Mengoni, Ermal Meta and Dario Faini – prod: Michele Canova)	2015	Marco Mengoni	Parole in circolo
"Sotto le stelle" (Written by Clemente Maccaro, Ermal Meta, Dario Faini and Fabrizio Ferraguzzo – prod: Shablo)	2015	Clementino	Miracolo!
"Occhi profondi" (Written by Ermal Meta and Dario Faini – prod: Luca Mattioni and Emma)	2015	Emma	Adesso
"Quando le canzoni finiranno" (Written by Diego Mancino and Dario Faini – prod: Luca Mattioni and Emma)	2015	Emma	Adesso
"Il paradiso non esiste" (Written by Emma Marrone, Diego Mancino and Dario Faini – prod: Luca Mattioni and Emma)	2015	Emma	Adesso
"La nostra estate" (Written by Marco Mengoni, Ermal Meta and Dario Faini – prod: Michele Canova)	2015	Marco Mengoni	Le cose che non ho
"Luca lo stesso" (Written by Luca Carboni, Tommaso Paradiso and Dario Faini – prod: Michele Canova)	2015	Luca Carboni	Pop-up
"Noi siamo infinito" (Written by Roberto Casalino, Ivan Amatucci and Dario Faini – prod: Fausto Cogliati)	2016	Alessio Bernabei	Noi siamo infinito
"La tua pelle bianca senza nei" (Written by Daniele Incicco and Dario Faini – prod: Fausto Cogliati)	2016	Alessio Bernabei	Noi siamo infinito
"Scordare noi" (Written by Daniele Incicco and Dario Faini – prod: Fausto Cogliati)	2016	Alessio Bernabei	Noi siamo infinito
"Due giganti" (Written by Antonio Filippelli, Dario Faini and Fabrizio Martorelli – prod: Fausto Cogliati)	2016	Alessio Bernabei	Noi siamo infinito
"Sul ciglio senza far rumore" (Written by Roberto Casalino and Dario Faini – prod: Roberto Ferraguzzo)	2016	Alessandra Amoroso	Vivere a colori
"Se il mondo ha il nostro volto" (Written by Roberto Casalino and Dario Faini – prod: Fabrizio Ferraguzzo)	2016	Alessandra Amoroso	Vivere a colori
"Il mio stato di felicità" (Written by Alfredo Rapetti, Federica Abbate and Dario Faini – prod: Roberto Cardelli)	2016	Alessandra Amoroso	Vivere a colori
"Luce che entra" (Written by Lorenzo Fragola, Ermal Meta, Dario Faini and Vanni Casagrande – prod: Fabrizio Ferraguzzo)	2016	Lorenzo Fragola	Zero Gravity
"Con le mani" (Written by Lorenzo Fragola, Ermal Meta, Dario Faini and Vanni Casagrande – prod: Fabrizio Ferraguzzo)	2016	Lorenzo Fragola	Zero Gravity
"Qualsiasi cosa, tutto" (Written by Lorenzo Fragola, Pier Di Biase, Fabrizio Ferraguzzo and Dario Faini – prod: Fabrizio Ferraguzzo)	2016	Lorenzo Fragola	Zero Gravity
"Sospeso" (Written by Lorenzo Fragola, Rory Di Benedetto, Roberto Pulitano and Dario Faini – prod: Fabrizio Ferraguzzo)	2016	Lorenzo Fragola	Zero Gravity
"Land" (Written by Lorenzo Fragola, Michelle Lily, Antonio Filippelli, Antonio Maiello and Dario Faini – prod: Fabrizio Ferraguzzo)	2016	Lorenzo Fragola	Zero Gravity
"Assenzio" (Written by Alessandro Aleotti, Federico Lucia, Angelo Rogoli, Dario Faini, Alessandro Merli and Fabio Clemente – prod: Takagi & Ketra)	2016	J-Ax and Fedez featuring Stash and Levante	Comunisti col Rolex
"Anni luce" (Written by Alessandro Aleotti, Federico Lucia, Angelo Rogoli, Dario Faini, Alessandro Merli and Fabio Clemente – prod: Takagi & Ketra)	2017	J-Ax and Fedez featuring Nek	Comunisti col Rolex
"Meglio tardi che noi" (Written by Alessandro Aleotti, Federico Lucia, Federica Abbate, Dario Faini, Alessandro Merli and Fabio Clemente – prod: Takagi & Ketra)	2017	J-Ax and Fedez featuring Arisa	Comunisti col Rolex
"Il cielo non mi basta" (Written by Antonio Di Martino, Federica Abbate, Fabrizio Ferraguzzo and Dario Faini – prod: Antonio Filippelli)	2017	Lodovica Comello	Non-album single
"A parte te" (Written by Ermal Meta and Dario Faini – prod: Ermal Meta)	2017	Ermal Meta	Vietato morire
"Caos (preludio)" (Written by Claudia Lagona and Dario Faini – prod: Antonio Filippelli)	2017	Levante	Nel caos di stanze stupefacenti
"1966 La stagione del rumore" (Written by Claudia Lagona and Dario Faini – prod: Antonio Filippelli)	2017	Levante	Nel caos di stanze stupefacenti
"Io ti maledico" (Written by Claudia Lagona and Dario Faini – prod: Antonio Filippelli)	2017	Levante	Nel caos di stanze stupefacenti
"Non me ne frega niente" (Written by Claudia Lagona and Dario Faini – prod: Antonio Filippelli)	2017	Levante	Nel caos di stanze stupefacenti
"Io ero io" (Written by Claudia Lagona and Dario Faini – prod: Antonio Filippelli)	2017	Levante	Nel caos di stanze stupefacenti
"Gesù Cristo sono io" (Written by Claudia Lagona and Dario Faini – prod: Antonio Filippelli)	2017	Levante	Nel caos di stanze stupefacenti
"Diamanti" (Written by Claudia Lagona and Dario Faini – prod: Antonio Filippelli)	2017	Levante	Nel caos di stanze stupefacenti
"Pezzo di me" (Written by Claudia Lagona, Francesco Gazzè and Dario Faini – prod: Antonio Filippelli)	2017	Levante featuring Max Gazzè	Nel caos di stanze stupefacenti
"Santa Rosalia" (Written by Claudia Lagona and Dario Faini – prod: Antonio Filippelli)	2017	Levante	Nel caos di stanze stupefacenti
"Le mie mille me" (Written by Claudia Lagona and Dario Faini – prod: Antonio Filippelli)	2017	Levante	Nel caos di stanze stupefacenti
"Sentivo le ali" (Written by Claudia Lagona and Dario Faini – prod: Antonio Filippelli)	2017	Levante	Nel caos di stanze stupefacenti
"Di tua bontà" (Written by Claudia Lagona and Dario Faini – prod: Antonio Filippelli)	2017	Levante	Nel caos di stanze stupefacenti
"Una favola non è" (Written by Ermal Meta and Dario Faini – prod: Luca Mattioni and Emma)	2017	Elodie	Tutta colpa mia
"Partiti adesso" (Written by Tommaso Paradiso, Dario Faini and Vanni Casagrande – prod: Fabrizio Ferraguzzo)	2017	Giusy Ferreri	Girotondo
"Occhi lucidi" (Written by Tommaso Paradiso and Dario Faini – prod: Fabrizio Ferraguzzo)	2017	Giusy Ferreri	Girotondo
"Col sole e col buio" (Written by Alessandro Raina and Dario Faini – prod: Fabrizio Ferraguzzo)	2017	Giusy Ferreri	Girotondo
"Il mondo non lo sa più fare" (Written by Diego Mancino and Dario Faini – prod: Fabrizio Ferraguzzo)	2017	Giusy Ferreri	Girotondo
"Tornerò da te" (Written by Alessandro Raina and Dario Faini – prod: Fabrizio Ferraguzzo)	2017	Giusy Ferreri	Girotondo
"Il resto del mondo è diverso da te" (Written by Diego Mancino and Dario Faini – prod: Fabrizio Ferraguzzo)	2017	Giusy Ferreri	Girotondo
"La gigantessa" (Written by Diego Mancino and Dario Faini – prod: Fabrizio Ferraguzzo)	2017	Giusy Ferreri	Girotondo
"Mi hai fatto fare tardi" (Written by Maria Chiara Fraschetta, Edoardo D'Erme, Tommaso Paradiso and Dario Faini – prod: Michele Canova)	2017	Nina Zilli	Modern Art
"Pamplona" (Written by Fabrizio Tarducci, Davide Petrella, Vanni Casagrande and Dario Faini – prod: MACE)	2017	Fabri Fibra featuring Thegiornalisti	Fenomeno
"Riccione" (Written by Tommaso Paradiso, Alessandro Raina and Dario Faini – prod: Dardust and Matteo Cantaluppi)	2017	Thegiornalisti	Non-album single
"Vulcano" (Written by Francesca Michielin and Dario Faini – prod: Michele Canova)	2017	Francesca Michielin	2640
"Autunno" (Written by Tommaso Paradiso and Dario Faini – prod: Diego Calvetti)	2017	Noemi	La luna
"I miei rimedi" (Written by Roberto Casalino, Daniele Incicco and Dario Faini – prod: Diego Calvetti)	2017	Noemi	La luna
"Mediterraneo" (Written by Claudia Lagona and Dario Faini – prod: Luciano Luisi)	2017	Gianni Morandi	D'amore d'autore
"Cinema" (Written by Gianna Nannini, Davide Petrella and Dario Faini – prod: Gianna Nannini)	2017	Gianna Nannini	Amore gigante
"Noleggiamo ancora un film" (Written by Francesca Michielin and Dario Faini – prod: Michele Canova)	2018	Francesca Michielin	2640
"Tropicale" (Written by Francesca Michielin and Dario Faini – prod: Michele Canova)	2018	Francesca Michielin	2640
"E se c'era…" (Written by Tommaso Paradiso and Dario Faini – prod: Michele Canova)	2018	Francesca Michielin	2640
"Lava" (Written by Francesca Michielin and Dario Faini – prod: Michele Canova)	2018	Francesca Michielin	2640
"Le ragazze come me" (Written by Davide Petrella and Dario Faini – prod: Luca Mattioni and Emma)	2018	Emma	Essere qui
"Dall'alba al tramonto" (Written by Ermal Meta, Dario Faini and Vanni Casagrande – prod: Ermal Meta and Roberto Cardelli)	2018	Ermal Meta	Non abbiamo armi
"Nero Bali" (Written by Alessandro Mahmoud, Cosimo Fini, Dario Faini and Vanni Casagrande – prod: Dardust and MACE)	2018	Elodie, Michele Bravi and Guè	This Is Elodie
"Felicità puttana" (Written by Tommaso Paradiso and Dario Faini – prod: Dardust)	2018	Thegiornalisti	Love
"Questa nostra stupida canzone d'amore" (Written by Tommaso Paradiso and Dario Faini – prod: Dardust)	2018	Thegiornalisti	Love
"New York" (Written by Tommaso Paradiso and Dario Faini – prod: Dardust)	2018	Thegiornalisti	Love
"La stessa" (Written by Paolo Antonacci and Dario Faini – prod: Dardust)	2018	Alessandra Amoroso	10
"Dalla tua parte" (Written by Federica Abbate, Alfredo Rapetti and Dario Faini – prod: Dardust)	2018	Alessandra Amoroso	10
"La gente non sei tu" (Written by Roberto Casalino, Daniele Incicco and Dario Faini – prod: Dardust)	2018	Alessandra Amoroso	10
"Trova un modo" (Written by Roberto Casalino and Dario Faini – prod: Dardust)	2018	Alessandra Amoroso	10
"Se piovesse il tuo nome" (Written by Edoardo D'Erme, Dario Faini and Vanni Casagrande – prod: Elisa, Andrea Rigonat and Taketo Gohara)	2018	Elisa	Diari aperti
"Vale per sempre" (Written by Eros Ramazzotti, Alfredo Rapetti, Federica Abbate, Tommaso Paradiso and Ray Heffernan – prod: Eros Ramazzotti and Antonio Filippelli)	2018	Eros Ramazzotti featuring Alessia Cara	Vita ce n'è
"Siamo" (Written by Eros Ramazzotti, Alfredo Rapetti, Federica Abbate and Dario Faini – prod: Eros Ramazzotti and Antonio Filippelli)	2018	Eros Ramazzotti	Vita ce n'è
"Incredibile voglia di niente" (Written by Emma Marrone, Diego Mancino and Dario Faini – prod: Luca Mattioni and Emma)	2018	Emma	Essere qui: Boom Edition
"Uh ah hey" (Written by Gionata Boschetti, Paolo Alberto Monachetti and Dario Faini – prod: Charlie Charles)	2018	Sfera Ebbasta	Rockstar (Popstar Edition)
"Rivoluzione" (Written by Marco Mengoni, Alessandro Mahmoud and Dario Faini – prod: Dardust)	2018	Marco Mengoni	Atlantico
"Everest" (Written by Marco Mengoni, Maurizio Carucci and Dario Faini – prod: Dardust)	2018	Marco Mengoni	Atlantico
"Atlantico" (Written by Dario Faini and Francesco Servidei – prod: Dardust)	2018	Marco Mengoni	Atlantico
"Soldi" (Written by Alessandro Mahmoud, Dario Faini and Paolo Alberto Monachetti – prod: Dardust and Charlie Charles)	2019	Mahmood	Gioventù bruciata
"Gli amanti sono pazzi" (Written by Diego Mancino, Dario Faini and Matteo Buzzanca – prod: Dardust)	2019	Arisa	Una nuova Rosalba in città
"La domenica dell'anima" (Written by Diego Mancino and Dario Faini – prod: Dardust)	2019	Arisa	Una nuova Rosalba in città
"Nuova era" (Written by Lorenzo Cherubini, Dario Faini, Christian Rigano and Riccardo Onori – prod: Dardust, Christian Rigano and Riccardo Onori)	2019	Jovanotti	Jova Beach Party
"Maradona y Pelé" (Written by Tommaso Paradiso and Dario Faini – prod: Dardust)	2019	Thegiornalisti	Non-album single
"Visti dall'alto" (Written by Mirko Martorana and Dario Faini – prod: Dardust and Charlie Charles)	2019	Rkomi	Dove gli occhi non arrivano
"Prima di partire" (Written by Luca Carboni, Giorgio Poti and Dario Faini – prod: Dardust)	2019	Luca Carboni featuring Giorgio Poi	Sputnik
"Barrio" (Written by Alessandro Mahmoud, Davide Petrella, Dario Faini and Paolo Alberto Monachetti – prod: Dardust and Charlie Charles)	2019	Mahmood	Non-album single
"Non avere paura" (Written by Tommaso Paradiso and Dario Faini – prod: Dardust)	2019	Tommaso Paradiso	Non-album single
"Vento sulla Luna" (Written by Annalisa Scarrone, Mirko Martorana, Federico Bertollini and Dario Faini – prod: Dardust)	2019	Annalisa featuring Rkomi	Nuda
"Fortuna" (Written by Emma Marrone, Vanni Casagrande and Dario Faini – prod: Dardust)	2019	Emma	Fortuna
"Io sono bella" (Written by Vasco Rossi, Gaetano Curreri, Piero Romitelli and Gerardo Pulli – prod: Dardust)	2019	Emma	Fortuna
"Stupida allegria" (Written by Federico Bertollini, Giovanni De Cataldo and Dario Faini – prod: Dardust)	2019	Emma	Fortuna
"Luci blu" (Written by Simone Cremonini and Davide Simonetta – prod: Dardust)	2019	Emma	Fortuna
"Quando l'amore finisce" (Written by Maurizio Carucci and Dario Faini – prod: Dardust)	2019	Emma	Fortuna
"Alibi" (Written by Emma Marrone, Vanni Casagrande and Dario Faini – prod: Dardust)	2019	Emma	Fortuna
"Mascara" (Written by Elisa Toffoli, Davide Petrella and Dario Faini – prod: Elisa)	2019	Emma	Fortuna
"I grandi progetti" (Written by Diego Mancino and Dario Faini – prod: Dardust)	2019	Emma	Fortuna
"Succede che" (Written by Alex Andrea Germano and Fabrizio Catitti – prod: Dardust)	2019	Emma	Fortuna
"Non sono Marra – La pelle" (Written by Fabio Rizzo, Alessandro Mahmoud, Giampaolo Parisi, Gianluca Cranco and Dario Faini – prod: TY1 and Dardust)	2019	Marracash featuring Mahmood	Persona
"Rapide" (Written by Alessandro Mahmoud, Dario Faini and Francesco Catitti – prod: Dardust)	2020	Mahmood	Ghettolimpo
"Andromeda" (Written by Alessandro Mahmoud and Dario Faini – prod: Dardust)	2020	Elodie	This Is Elodie
"Yo no tengo nada" (Written by Francesca Michielin, Elisa Toffoli and Dario Faini – prod: Dardust)	2020	Francesca Michielin featuring Elisa	Feat (stato di natura)
"Ma lo vuoi capire?" (Written by Tommaso Paradiso and Dario Faini – prod: Dardust)	2020	Tommaso Paradiso	Non-album single
"Guaranà" (Written by Davide Petrella and Dario Faini – prod: Dardust)	2020	Elodie	This Is Elodie (digital reissue)
"Non avevano ragione i Maya" (Written by Chiara Galiazzo, Alessandro Raina and Dario Faini – prod: Katoo)	2020	Chiara Galiazzo	Bonsai
"Scat Men" (Written by Lauro De Marinis, Ghali Amdouni, Davide De Luca, John Larkin, Matteo Ciceroni, Dario Faini and Antonio Catania – prod: Achille Lauro, Diva, Grow Tribe, Dardust and Marnik)	2020	Achille Lauro featuring Ghali and Gemitaiz	1990
"Dorado" (Written by Alessandro Mahmoud, Gionata Boschetti, Salomón Villada Hoyos, Davide Petrella and Dario Faini – prod: Dardust)	2020	Mahmood featuring Sfera Ebbasta and Feid	Ghettolimpo
"Latina" (Written by Edoardo D'Erme, Davide Petrella and Dario Faini – prod: Dardust)	2020	Emma	Fortuna (digital reissue)
"Pezzo di cuore" (Written by Davide Petrella and Dario Faini – prod: Dardust)	2021	Emma and Alessandra Amoroso	Non-album single
"Il mio amico" (Written by Francesca Calearo, Fabrizio Tardu ci, Nicolas Biasin and Dario Faini – prod: Bias and Dardust)	2021	Madame featuring Fabri Fibra	Madame
"Voce" (Written by Francesca Calearo, Dario Faini and Enrico Botta – prod: Dardust and Estremo)	2021	Madame	Madame
"Incubo" (Written by Marco De Cesaris, Alessio Aresu and Dario Faini – prod: Dardust)	2021	Psicologi	Millennium Bug X
"Inuyasha" (Written by Alessandro Mahmoud and Dario Faini – prod: Dardust)	2021	Mahmood	Ghettolimpo
"Tutta la notte" (Written by Giovanni Damian, Dario Faini and Nicolas Biasin – prod: Bias and Dardust)	2021	Sangiovanni	Sangiovanni
"Quando trovo te" (Written by Francesco Renga, Roberto Casalino and Dario Faini – prod: Dorado Inc.)	2021	Francesco Renga	Non-album single
"La genesi del tuo colore" (Written by Filippo Maria Fanti, Giulio Nenna and Dario Faini – prod: Dardust and Giulio Nenna)	2021	Irama	Non-album single
"Amare" (Written by Veronica Lucchesi, Dario Mangiaracina, Roberto Cammarata and Dario Faini – prod: La Rappresentante di Lista and Dardust)	2021	La Rappresentante di Lista	My Mamma
"Glicine" (Written by Alessandro Mahmoud, Ginevra Lubrano, Dario Faini and Francesco Fugazza – prod: Dardust and MUUT)	2021	Noemi	Metamorfosi
"Si illumina" (Written by Federico Bertollini and Dario Faini – prod: Dardust)	2021	Noemi	Metamorfosi
"Orione" (Written by Leonardo Lamacchia, Giovanni Pollex, Stefano Milella and Dario Faini – prod: Giordano Colombo and Dorado Inc.)	2021	Leonardo Lamacchia	Non-album single
"Sorriso grande" (Written by Federica Abbate, Alfredo Rapetti, Dario Faini, Alessandro Merli and Fabio Clemente – prod: Dorado Inc.)	2021	Alessandra Amoroso	Tutto accade
"Ho spento il cielo" (Written by Mirko Martorana, Tommaso Paradiso and Dario Faini – prod: Dardust)	2021	Rkomi and Tommaso Paradiso	Taxi Driver
"Sopra le canzoni" (Written by Mirko Martorana, Filippo Uttinacci and Dario Faini – prod: Dardust)	2021	Rkomi	Taxi Driver
"Malibù" (Written by Giovanni Damian, Alessandro La Cava and Dario Faini – prod: Dardust)	2021	Sangiovanni	Sangiovanni
"Kobra" (Written by Alessandro Mahmoud, Dario Faini and Francesco Catitti – prod: Katoo and Dardust)	2021	Mahmood	Ghettolimpo
"Baci dalla Tunisia" (Written by Alessandro Mahmoud, Josh Rosinet and Dario Faini – Dardust)	2021	Mahmood	Ghettolimpo
"Klan" (Written by Alessandro Mahmoud, Davide Petrella, Marc Seguí, Xavier Perez and Dario Faini – prod: Dardust)	2021	Mahmood	Ghettolimpo
"Zero" (Written by Alessandro Mahmoud, Davide Petrella and Dario Faini – prod: Dardust)	2021	Mahmood	Ghettolimpo
"Rubini" (Written by Alessandro Mahmoud, Elisa Toffoli and Dario Faini – prod: Dardust)	2021	Mahmood featuring Elisa	Ghettolimpo
"Talata" (Written by Alessandro Mahmoud and Dario Faini – prod: Dardust)	2021	Mahmood	Ghettolimpo
"Marea" (Written by Francesca Calearo, Nicolas Biasin and Dario Faini – prod: Bias and Dardust)	2021	Madame	Madame (digital reissue)
"Melodia proibita" (Written by Filippo Maria Fanti, Francesco Monti, Giuseppe Colonnelli, Giulio Nenna and Dario Faini – prod: Dardust)	2021	Irama	Non-album single
"Vita" (Written by Veronica Lucchesi, Dario Mangiaracina, Federica Abbate and Dario Faini – prod: Dardust, Papa D and Piccolo Cobra)	2021	La Rappresentante di Lista	My Mamma
"Vertigine" (Written by Elisa Toffoli, Davide Petrella and Dario Faini – prod: Dardust)	2021	Elodie	OK. Respira
"Raggi gamma" (Written by Giovanni Damian, Alessandro La Cava, Jacopo Adamo, Dario Lombardi and Dario Faini – prod: Dardust, Erin and JxN)	2021	Sangiovanni	Sangiovanni (digital reissue)
"Eva+Eva" (Written by Annalisa Scarrone, Rosa Luini, Federico Bertollini and Dario Faini – prod: Dorado Inc.)	2021	Annalisa featuring Rose Villain	Nuda10
"Leoni al sole" (Written by Tommaso Paradiso, Vanni Casagrande, Antonio Fiordispino and Dario Faini – prod: Stash)	2021	The Kolors	Non-album single
"AleAleAle" (Written by Paolo Antonacci and Dario Faini – prod: Dorado Inc.)	2021	Alessandra Amoroso	Tutto accade
"Canzone inutile" (Written by Federica Abbate, Rocco Pagliarulo, Alfredo Rapetti, Alessandro Merli and Fabio Clemente – prod: Katoo and Dardust)	2021	Alessandra Amoroso	Tutto accade
"Il bisogno che ho di te" (Written by Paolo Antonacci and Dario Faini – prod: Dorado Inc.)	2021	Alessandra Amoroso	Tutto accade
"Tutto accade" (Written by Federica Abbate, Alfredo Rapetti, Alessandro Merli, Fabio Clemente and Dario Faini – prod: Takagi & Ketra)	2021	Alessandra Amoroso	Tutto accade
"Seta" (Written by Elisa Toffoli, Davide Petrella and Dario Faini – prod: Dardust)	2021	Elisa	Ritorno al futuro/Back to the Future
"La coda del diavolo" (Written by Mirko Martorana, Davide Petrella, Dario Faini, Alessandro Pulga and Stefano Tognini – prod: Marz and Zef)	2021	Rkomi and Elodie	Taxi Driver+
"Ogni volta è così" (Written by Emma Marrone, Davide Petrella and Dario Faini – prod: Dardust)	2022	Emma	Non-album single
"Ti amo non lo so dire" (Written by Alessandro Mahmoud, Alessandro La Cava and Dario Faini – prod: Dorado Inc.)	2022	Noemi	Non-album single
"Virale" (Written by Matteo Romano, Federico Rossi, Alessandro La Cava and Dario Faini – prod: Dorado Inc.)	2022	Matteo Romano	Non-album single
"Palla al centro" (Written by Elisa Toffoli, Vanni Casagrande and Dario Faini – prod: Dardust)	2022	Elisa and Jovanotti	Ritorno al futuro/Back to the Future
"Cadere volare" (Written by Giovanni Damian, Alessandro La Cava and Dario Faini – prod: Dardust)	2022	Sangiovanni	Cadere volare
"Parolacce" (Written by Giovanni Damian, Alessandro La Cava and Dario Faini – prod: Dardust)	2022	Sangiovanni	Cadere volare
"Bolero" (Written by Claudia Nahum, Michael Holbrook Penniman, Jacopo Ettorre, Filippo Uttinacci and Dario Faini – prod: Dardust)	2022	Baby K featuring Mika	Donna sulla Luna
"Bonsoir" (Written by Francesca Michielin, Lorenzo Urciullo and Dario Faini – prod: Francesca Michielin, Dardust and Enrico Brun)	2022	Francesca Michielin	Cani sciolti
"L'eccezione" (Written by Francesca Calearo and Luca Faraone – prod: Faraone and Dardust)	2022	Madame	Non-album single
"Stelle" (Written by Fabrizio Tarducci, Maurizio Carucci and Dario Faini – prod: Dardust)	2022	Fabri Fibra featuring Maurizio Carucci	Caos
"Tutti i miei ricordi" (Written by Marco Mengoni, Alessandro La Cava, Roberto Casalino and Dario Faini – prod: Dardust)	2022	Marco Mengoni	Materia (Pelle)
"Normale" (Written by Alessandro Mahmoud, Riccardo Schiara, Mario Fracchiola, Dario Faini and Massimiliano Dagani – prod: Big Fish and Dardust)	2022	Giorgia	Blu
"Mare di guai" (Written by Arianna Del Ghiaccio, Edoardo D'Erme, Vincenzo Centrella and Dario Faini – prod: Dardust)	2023	Ariete	La notte
"Cenere" (Written by Jacopo Lazzarini, Davide Petrella and Dario Faini – prod: Dardust)	2023	Lazza	Sirio (digital reissue)
"Due" (Written by Elodie Di Patrizi, Federica Abbate, Jacopo Ettorre and Francesco Catitti – prod: Dardust and Katoo)	2023	Elodie	OK. Respira
"Purple in the Sky" (Written by Elodie Di Patrizi, Alessandro Mahmoud, Davide Petrella and Dario Faini – prod: Dardust)	2023	Elodie	OK. Respira
"Danse la vie" (Written by Elodie Di Patrizi, Federica Abbate, Jacopo Ettorre and Dario Faini – prod: Dardust)	2023	Elodie	OK. Respira
"Strobo" (Written by Elodie Di Patrizi, Davide Petrella and Dario Faini – prod: Dardust)	2023	Elodie	OK. Respira
"Mai più" (Written by Elodie Di Patrizi, Alessandro Mahmoud, Davide Petrella, Stefano Tognini and Dario Faini – prod: Dardust)	2023	Elodie	OK. Respira
"Apocalisse" (Written by Alessandro Mahmoud and Dario Faini – prod: Dardust)	2023	Elodie	OK. Respira
"Una come cento" (Written by Elodie Di Patrizi, Alessandro Mahmoud and Francesco Catitti – prod: Dardust and Katoo)	2023	Elodie	OK. Respira
"Senza confine" (Written by Giorgia Todrani, Elisa Toffoli, Vanni Casagrande, Dario Faini, Mario Fracchiolla and Massimiliano Dagani – prod: Big Fish and Rhade)	2023	Giorgia	Blu
"La festa della cruda verità" (Written by Francesca Calearo and Dario Faini – prod: Dardust)	2023	Madame	L'amore
"L'onda – La morte del marinaio" (Written by Francesca Calearo and Dario Faini – prod: Dardust)	2023	Madame	L'amore
"Ballerine e guantoni" (Written by Matteo Lucido, Vanni Casagrande and Dario Faini – prod: Dardust)	2023	Wax	Wax
"Tutte le volte" (Written by Tommaso Paradiso and Dario Faini – prod: Dardust)	2023	Laura Pausini	Anime Parallele
"Quando nevica" (Written by Elisa Toffoli, Edoardo D'Erme and Dario Faini – prod: Dardust)	2023	Elisa	Intimate – Recordings at Abbey Road Studios
"Fighter" (Written by Ana Zimmer, Manon Romiti, Silvio Lisbonne and Dario Faini – prod: Dardust)	2024	Tali	Non-album single
"Pazzo di te" (Written by Francesco Renga, Filippo Neviani, Diego Mancino and Dario Faini – prod: Nek and Luca Chiaravalli)	2024	Francesco Renga and Nek	RengaNek
"La noia" (Written by Angelina Mango, Francesca Calearo and Dario Faini – prod: Dardust)	2024	Angelina Mango	Poké melodrama
"Sempre / Jamais" (Written by Alessandro Mahmoud, Angèle Van Leaken, Dario Faini and Lucas Vuaflart – prod: Dardust and Lucasv)	2024	Mahmood featuring Angèle	Nei letti degli altri
"Mammamì" (Written by Salvatore Moccia, Alex Andrea Vella, Francesco Perelli and Dario Faini – prod: Dardust)	2024	Petit	Petit
"I t'o giur'" (Written by Emanuele Palumbo, Gionata Boschetti, Davide Petrella and Dario Faini – prod: Dardust)	2024	Geolier featuring Sfera Ebbasta	Dio lo sa
"Mai per sempre" (Written by Emanuele Palumbo, Davide Petrella and Dario Faini – prod: Dardust)	2024	Geolier	Dio lo sa – Atto II
"Montecristo" (Written by Lorenzo Cherubini and Dario Faini – prod: Dardust)	2025	Jovanotti	Il corpo umano vol. 1
"Fuorionda" (Written by Lorenzo Cherubini and Dario Faini – prod: Dardust)	2025	Jovanotti	Il corpo umano vol. 1
"Un mondo a parte" (Written by Lorenzo Cherubini and Dario Faini – prod: Dardust)	2025	Jovanotti	Il corpo umano vol. 1
"Le foglie di te" (Written by Lorenzo Cherubini and Dario Faini – prod: Dardust)	2025	Jovanotti	Il corpo umano vol. 1
"Universo" (Written by Lorenzo Cherubini and Dario Faini – prod: Dardust)	2025	Jovanotti	Il corpo umano vol. 1
"La grande emozione" (Written by Lorenzo Cherubini and Dario Faini – prod: Dardust)	2025	Jovanotti	Il corpo umano vol. 1
"Il corpo umano" (Written by Lorenzo Cherubini and Dario Faini – prod: Dardust)	2025	Jovanotti	Il corpo umano vol. 1
"Febbre" (Written by Clara Soccini, Francesca Calearo, Jacopo Ettorre, Federica Abbate and Dario Faini – prod: Dardust)	2025	Clara	TBA
"Mi ami mi odi" (Written by Elodie Di Patrizi, Elisa Toffoli, Jacopo Ettorre and Dario Faini – prod: Dardust)	2025	Elodie	Mi ami mi odi
"Golpe" (Written by Giorgia Todrani, Edoardo D'Erme, Davide Petrella, Gaetano Scognamiglio and Dario Faini – prod: Calcutta and Dardust)	2025	Giorgia	G
"Tra le lune e le dune" (Written by Jacopo Ettorre, Dario Faini and Nicola Lazzarin – prod: Dardust and Cripo)	2025	Giorgia	G
"Aiaiai" (Written by Angelina Mango, Edoardo D'Erme and Dario Faini – prod: Angelina Mango and Dardust)	2025	Angelina Mango	Caramé
"Stella stellina" (Written by Ermal Meta, Giovanni Pollex and Dario Faini – prod: Dardust)	2026	Ermal Meta	Funzioni vitali
