= Dorado (song) =

Single by Mahmood, Sfera Ebbasta and Feid

from the album Ghettolimpo
- Released: 9 July 2020
- Genre: Latin trap
- Length: 2:58
- Label: Island
- Songwriters: Alessandro Mahmoud; Gionata Boschetti; Salomón Villada Hoyos; Davide Petrella; Christian Bértolo; Dario Faini
- Producer: Dardust

Mahmood singles chronology
"Moonlight popolare" (2020)	"Dorado" (2020)	"Inuyasha" (2021)

Sfera Ebbasta singles chronology
"M' manc" (2020)	"Dorado" (2020)	"Bottiglie privè" (2020)

Music video
- "Dorado" on YouTube

"Dorado" is a song recorded by Italian singer Mahmood, Italian rapper Sfera Ebbasta and Colombian singer Feid. It was released on 9 July 2020 by Island Records as the second single from Mahmood's second studio album Ghettolimpo. The song peaked at number 10 on the Italian Singles Chart and it was written by the three artists with co-writing contribution by Davide Petrella, Christian Bértolo and Dario Faini.

== Music video ==
A music video to accompany the release of "Dorado" was first released onto YouTube on 16 July 2020. The music video was directed by Attilio Cusani and shot inside the Egyptian Museum in Turin.

== Personnel ==
Credits adapted from Tidal.

- DRD– producer, composer
- Feid – associated performer, author, vocals
- Alessandro Mahmoud – associated performer, author, vocals
- Sfera Ebbasta – associated performer, vocals
- Christian Senra Bértolo – author
- Davide Petrella – author
- Gionata Boschetti – author

== Charts ==
Chart performance of "Dorado"
Chart (2020)	Peak position
Greece (IFPI)	22
Italy (FIMI)	10
San Marino (SMRRTV Top 50)	15

== Certifications ==
Region	Certification	Certified units/sales
Italy (FIMI)	Platinum	70,000^{‡}
^{‡} Sales+streaming figures based on certification alone.
