= Rapide (song) =

Single by Mahmood

from the album Ghettolimpo
- Released: 16 January 2020
- Recorded: 2019
- Genre: Pop; R&B
- Length: 4:03
- Label: Island Records
- Songwriters: Alessandro Mahmoud; Dario Faini; Francesco Catitti
- Producer: Dardust

Mahmood singles chronology
"Barrio" (2019)	"Rapide" (2020)	"Moonlight popolare" (2020)

"Rapide" is a song written and recorded by Italian singer Mahmood. The song was released for digital download on 16 January 2020 by Island Records as the lead single from Mahmood's second studio album Ghettolimpo. The song peaked at number five on the Italian Singles Chart and it was certified double platinum.

== Background ==
The song was produced by Dardust and written by Mahmood, Dario Faini (as Dardust) and Francesco Catitti. Wiwibloggs said, "'Rapide' sets a different tone compared to Mahmood's previous singles 'Barrio' and 'Soldi'. The track sees the reigning Sanremo champ touches upon different relationship aspects. He gets even with a past love. Lyrics like "I won't fall into your rapids" or "now that I have nothing I'll defend myself from the trust I didn't and don't have" underline his state of mind. Mahmood also brings the subject of cheating and heartbreak across in his delicate vocal delivery. With the support of simple yet effective production, the chorus is where his voice stands out the most. Several Italian expletives are interwoven throughout the lyrics, illustrating his frustrations."

== Music video ==
A music video to accompany the release of "Rapide" was first released onto YouTube on 23 January 2020. The music video was produced by Antonio Giampalo for Maestro Production.

== Accolades ==
Year-end lists
Publication	Accolade	Rank	Ref.
All Music Italia	The Best Songs of 2020	13	
Rockit	The 30 Best Italian Songs of 2020	15	
Rolling Stone	The 15 Best Italian Songs of 2020	9	

== Track listing ==
Digital download
No.	Title	Length
1.	"Rapide"	4:03

== Charts ==
=== Weekly charts ===
Chart (2020)	Peak position
Italy (FIMI)	5

=== Year-end charts ===
Chart (2020)	Position
Italy (FIMI)	33

== Certifications ==
Region	Certification	Certified units/sales
Italy (FIMI)	2× Platinum	140,000^{‡}
^{‡} Sales+streaming figures based on certification alone.

== Release history ==
Region	Date	Format	Label
Italy	16 January 2020	Digital download; streaming	Island Records
