= Charlie Charles =

Italian record producer (born 1994)

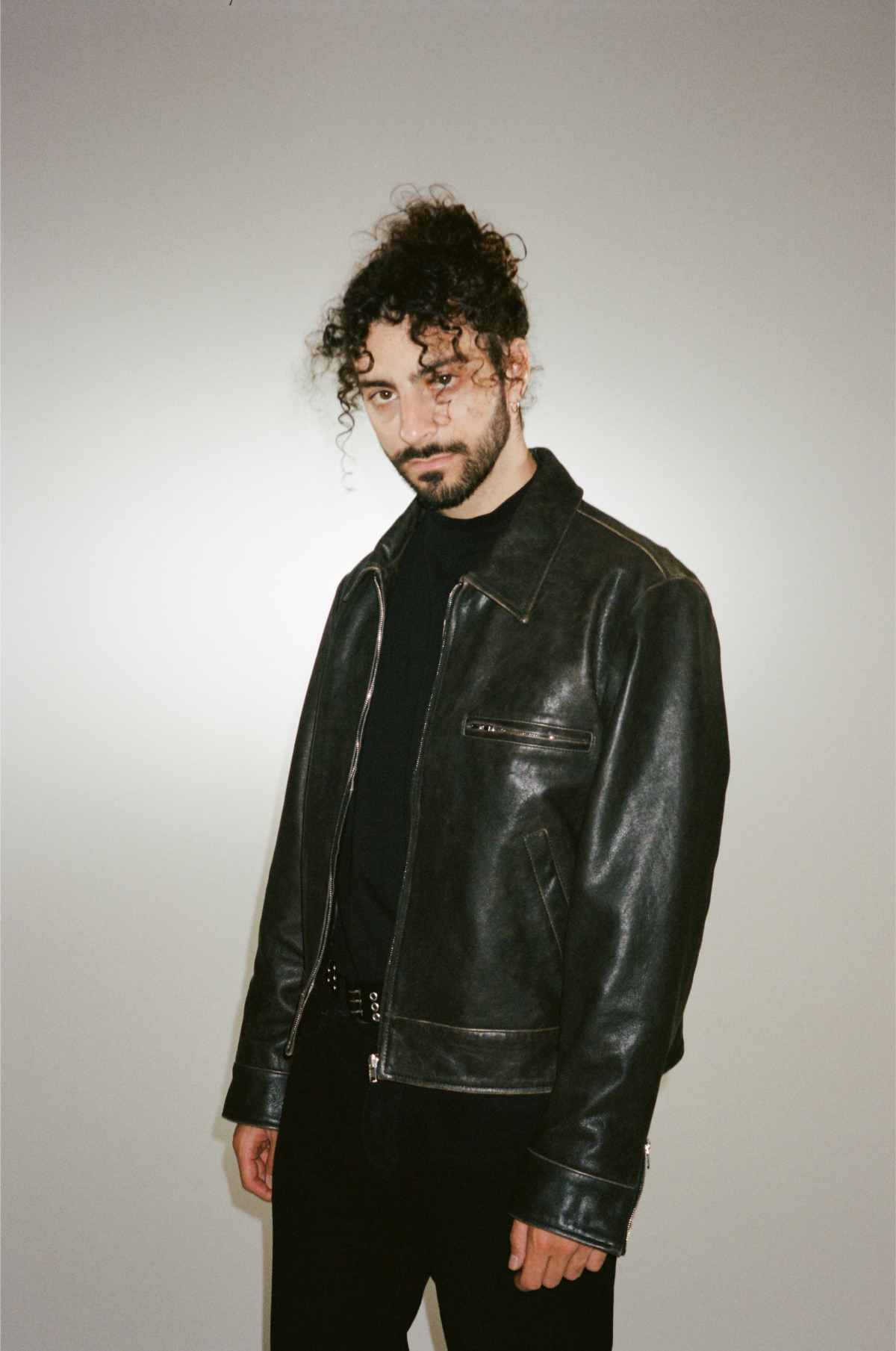
- Charlie Charles 2025

Background information
- Born: Paolo Alberto Monachetti; 24 March 1994 (age 32); Milan, Italy
- Genres: Trap; Hip Hop; Pop
- Occupation: Record producer
- Years active: 2015–present
- Labels: Universal Music; Island Records Italy

Paolo Alberto Monachetti (born 24 March 1994), known professionally as Charlie Charles, is an Italian record producer.

== Career ==
Monachetti began his career listening to and producing electronic music, also dedicating himself to composing soundtracks. After changing schools several times, he dropped out of high school to dedicate himself solely to music, starting his own recording studio in Seguro. He soon after met the rapper Sfera Ebbasta, starting a musical collaboration that culminated in 2015 with the studio album XDVR. The year 2015 also marked his collaboration with Marracash for the independent record label Roccia Music, producing various songs and albums with Ghali, Tedua, Izi, Guè and Dark Polo Gang, alongside Sfera Ebbasta.

In 2017, Charlie Charles released the single "Bimbi" in collaboration with Izi, Rkomi, Sfera Ebbasta, Tedua and Ghali, which achieved third place on the Top Singles chart, remaining there for 25 consecutive weeks and becoming a certified double platinum record. That same year, he released the single "Rap" with Izi; the following year, he released "Peace & Love" (with Sfera Ebbasta and Ghali). In 2018, he founded the Billion Headz Music Group together with Sfera Ebbasta.

In 2019, together with Dardust and Mahmood he produced the song "Soldi", which won in the Sanremo Music Festival 2019. The collaboration with the two artists was renewed in April with the release of the single "Calipso", which also featured rappers Sfera Ebbasta and Fabri Fibra. In the same year, he collaborated with singer Francesca Michielin on the song "Cheyenne".

In 2022, he produced the single "Siri" together with Thasup, Lazza and Sfera Ebbasta. The following year, he returned with the single "Obladi oblada" in collaboration with rappers Ghali, Thasup and Fabri Fibra. On 23 October 2025, he released his first solo studio album La bella confusione.

== Discography ==
=== Studio albums ===
List of studio albums, with chart positions and certifications
Title	Album details	Peak chart positions
Title	Album details	ITA
La bella confusione	Released: 23 October 2025; Label: Island; Formats: CD, digital download	6

=== Collaborative albums ===
List of collaborative albums, with chart positions and certifications
Title	Album details	Peak chart positions	Certifications
Title	Album details	ITA	Certifications
XDVR (with Sfera Ebbasta)	Released: 11 June 2015; Label: BillionHeadz Music Group, Roccia Music; Formats: CD, digital download	38	FIMI: Platinum

=== Singles ===
List of singles with selected chart positions, showing year released and album name
Title	Year	Peak chart positions		Certifications	Album
Title	Year	ITA	SWI	Certifications	Album
"Niagara" (with Izi)	2016	—	—		Non-album singles
"Bimbi" (featuring Izi, Rkomi, Sfera Ebbasta, Tedua and Ghali)	2017	3	—	FIMI: 2× Platinum	Non-album singles
"Rap" (featuring Izi)	2017	15	—	FIMI: Gold	Non-album singles
"Peace & Love" (with Sfera Ebbasta and Ghali)	2018	1	31	FIMI: 3× Platinum	Non-album singles
"Calipso" (with Dardust featuring Sfera Ebbasta, Mahmood and Fabri Fibra)	2019	1	—	FIMI: 4× Platinum	TBA
"Obladi oblada" (with Ghali and Thasup featuring Fabri Fibra)	2023	43	—		Non-album single
"Attacchi di panico" (with Blanco)	2025	28	—		La bella confusione
