= Mahmood (singer) =

Italian singer-songwriter (born 1992)

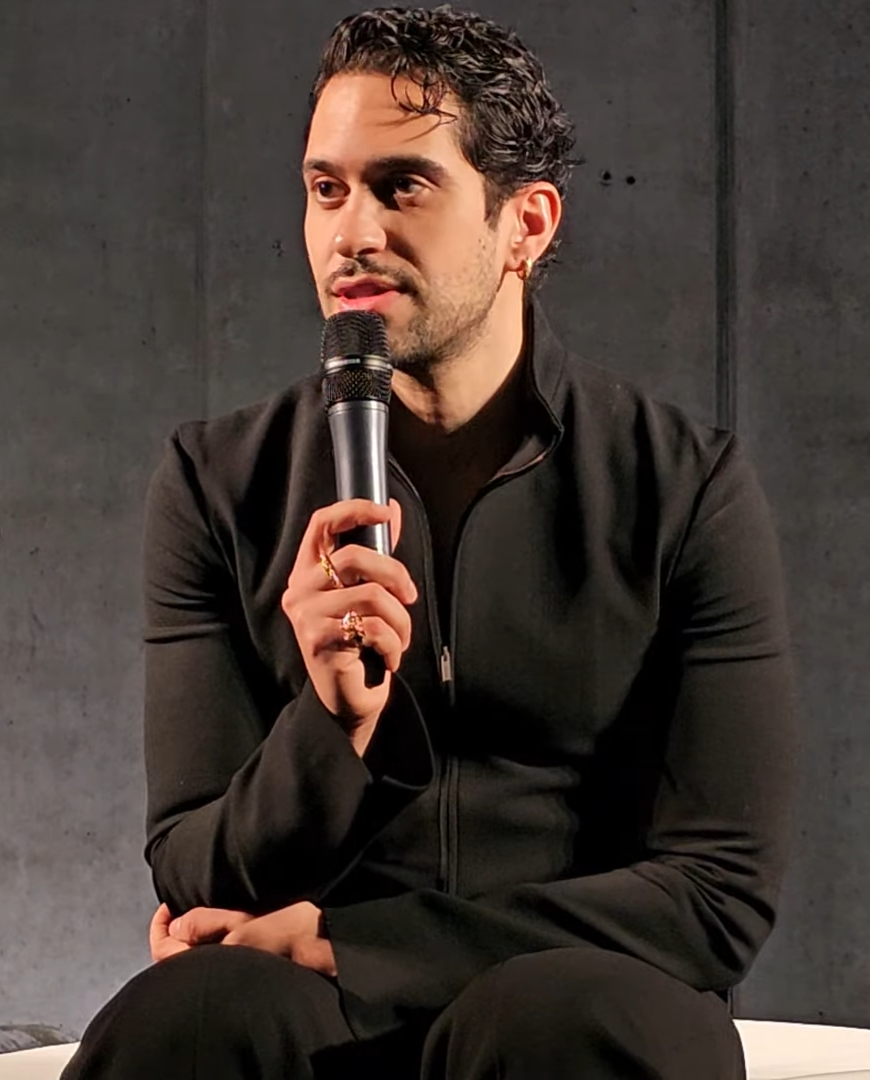
- Mahmood in February 2024

Background information
- Born: Alessandro Mahmoud; 12 September 1992 (age 34); Milan, Italy
- Genres: Pop; R&B; hip hop
- Occupations: Singer; songwriter
- Years active: 2012–present
- Label: Universal Music
- Website: mahmood.it

Alessandro Mahmoud (born 12 September 1992), known professionally as Mahmood, is an Italian singer and songwriter. He rose to prominence after competing on the sixth season of the Italian version of The X Factor. He has won the Sanremo Music Festival twice, in 2019 with the song "Soldi" and in 2022 alongside Blanco with the song "Brividi". His Sanremo victories allowed him to represent Italy in the Eurovision Song Contest in those respective years, finishing in second place in 2019 and, as the host entrant, in sixth place in 2022.

Mahmood has released three studio albums, Gioventù bruciata (2019), Ghettolimpo (2021), and Nei letti degli altri (2024). Amazon Music Italy listed him as one of the most streamed artists in Italy in 2023.

== Early life ==
Born in Milan to an Egyptian father and a Sardinian mother from Orosei, Mahmood was raised around the Milanese district of Gratosoglio. When he was five years old, his parents divorced and he was subsequently raised by his mother.

== Career ==
=== 2012–2018: X Factor and beginnings ===
In 2012, Mahmood auditioned for the sixth season of the Italian version of The X Factor. He became part of the boys category mentored by Simona Ventura. He was originally eliminated at Judges Houses, then returned as a wildcard, before eventually being eliminated in the third episode. After this experience, he worked in a bar and attended a music school, studying piano, solfeggio and music theory, where he also started writing songs. In 2013, he released his debut single "Fallin' Rain".

In 2016, Mahmood participated in the Newcomers Section of Sanremo Music Festival with the song "Dimentica". In 2017, he released the single "Pesos", with which he participated in the fifth edition of the Wind Summer Festival, winning the third episode of the Youth section. In 2017, he was also featured on Fabri Fibra's single "Luna". In September 2018, he released his debut extended play, Gioventù bruciata. In November 2018, Marco Mengoni released his fifth album, Atlantico, which features three tracks co-written by Mahmood, including the single "Hola (I Say)".

=== 2018–2020: Gioventù bruciata, Sanremo and Eurovision ===
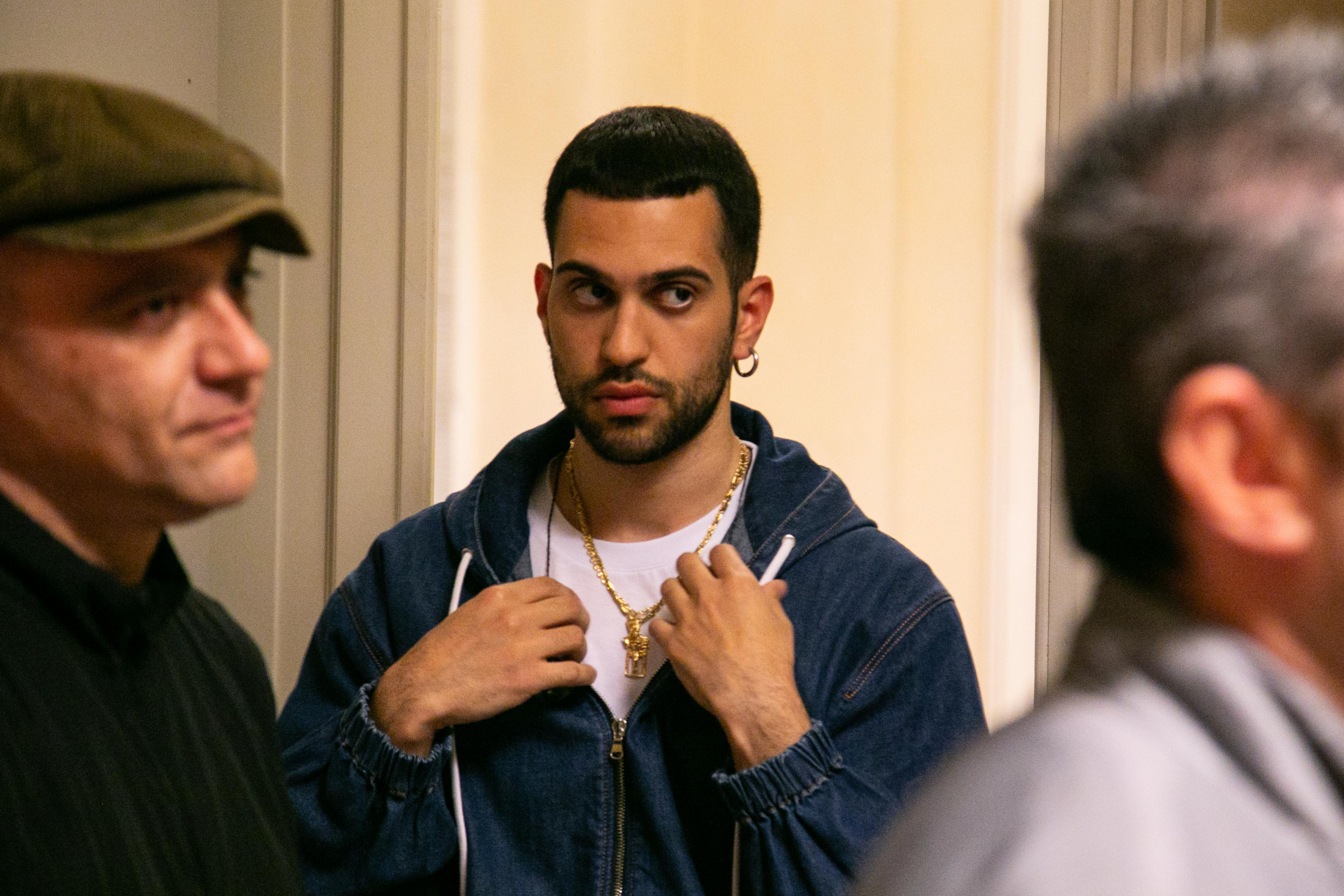
Mahmood in April 2019

In December 2018, Mahmood was one of 24 acts selected to compete in Sanremo Giovani, a televised competition aimed at selecting two newcomers as contestants of the 69th Sanremo Music Festival. Mahmood was placed first in the second episode of the show, with his entry "Gioventù bruciata", also receiving the Critics' Award among acts performing in the second final. "Soldi" was later announced as his entry for the Sanremo Music Festival 2019.

Mahmood performed the song for the first time during the first live show of the 69th Sanremo Music Festival, which was held on 5 February 2019. Dario "Dardust" Faini, co-writer of the song, directed the Sanremo Orchestra during his performance. During the third live show, "Soldi" was the first performance of the night. On 8 February 2019, Mahmood performed the song in a new version, featuring rapper Gué Pequeno. During the first round of the final, "Soldi" placed 7th in the televote, but was the most voted by the experts jury, and the second most voted by the press jury. As a result, Mahmood gained a spot in the top three acts of the competition and after an additional performance, the song was declared the winner of the 69th Sanremo Music Festival. Mahmood also received the "Enzo Jannacci" Award for Best Performance. and the "Premio Baglioni d'oro" award for best song voted by the participating artists.

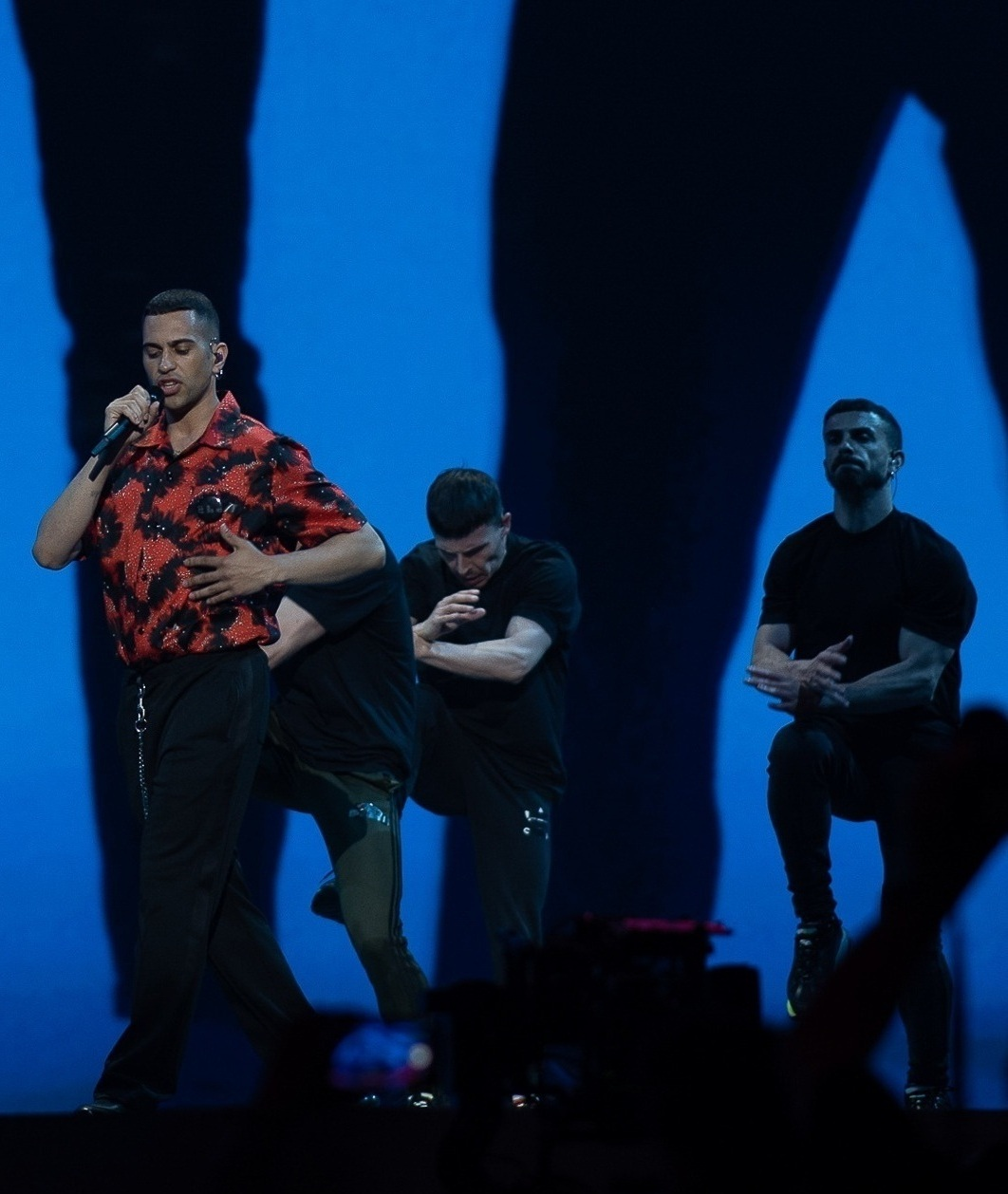
Mahmood during a Eurovision rehearsal in May 2019

On 22 February 2019, Mahmood reissued Gioventù bruciata as a full-length studio album, which topped the Italian albums chart. In April 2019, Mahmood was featured on the single "Calipso" by Charlie Charles and Dardust, which topped the Italian singles chart. In May 2019, he represented Italy at the Eurovision Song Contest 2019 in Tel Aviv, Israel. He performed "Soldi" in the grand final of the contest on 18 May, placing second in the final ranking. The song topped the charts in Greece, Israel, Italy and Lithuania and reached the top 10 in five more countries, eventually becoming the most-streamed Eurovision song ever on Spotify, a record held until late January 2021 when it was surpassed by the 2019 Eurovision winner, "Arcade" by Duncan Laurence. Mahmood performed at the closing ceremony of the 2019 Summer Universiade in Naples with three of his songs "Soldi", "Gioventù bruciata" and "Anni 90".

=== 2020–2023: Ghettolimpo, return to Sanremo and Eurovision ===
On 11 June 2021, Mahmood released his second studio album, Ghettolimpo. The album's release was preceded by five singles: "Rapide", "Dorado" (in collaboration with fellow Italian rapper Sfera Ebbasta and Colombian singer Feid), "Inuyasha", "Zero" (also included in the soundtrack of the 2021 Netflix series of the same name) and "Klan". In August 2021, he published the final single "Rubini" featuring italian singer Elisa.

Mahmood made his return to Sanremo in 2022 alongside Blanco with the song "Brividi", with which they won and thus earned the right to represent Italy at the Eurovision Song Contest 2022 in Turin. The song reached number 15 on the Billboard Global 200 chart dated 19 February 2022. At the contest in Turin, "Brividi" finished in sixth place with 268 points.

Being a popular Eurovision star, Mahmood was one of the guest artists invited to sing at the grand final interval act "Liverpool Songbook" of the ESC 2023, he sang Imagine by John Lennon.

=== 2024–present: Third Sanremo entry and Nei letti degli altri ===
He competed again in Sanremo in 2024 with the song "Tuta gold", the song immediately peaked at number one in Italy. The song was included on his third studio album Nei letti degli altri, published on 16 February 2024.

He co-hosted the fourth night of the 2025 festival alongside Geppi Cucciari and Carlo Conti.

== Public image ==
Following Mahmood's Sanremo win in 2019, then Deputy Prime Minister Matteo Salvini, who is known for his anti-immigrant views, criticized him for winning over Ultimo who received the highest number of public votes.

The same year, he was named to the Italian Forbes 30 Under 30, a list showcasing entrepreneurs, entertainers and celebrities who have made a name for themselves before reaching the age of 30.

== Personal life ==
Mahmood has an aversion to being categorized by his nationality and rumours on his sexuality. He has stated that "labelling ourselves creates distinctions" and that "there is no need to explain our own preferences, until homosexuality will be perceived as a normal thing, which it is." When speaking in favour of a proposed law against homophobic and transphobic hate crimes, he described having been subjected to homophobic bullying during his schooling. Between 2020 and 2025, he was in a relationship with a Brazilian male model.

Mahmood is Catholic, He speaks some Arabic, and is fluent in Sardinian.

== Artistry ==
The stage name Mahmood is a portmanteau of Alessandro's surname Mahmoud and the English expression my mood.

Mahmood has described his music as Moroccan pop. According to him "what sets me apart are the Middle Eastern sounds that emerge here and there". "Soldi", which is an autobiographic song about his "unconventional family", includes a sentence in Arabic. One of his earliest musical memories is listening to Arabic music with his father before he left the family. He considers himself very linked to Sardinian culture and folklore, which often acts as a source of inspiration for the composition of his songs.

Growing up Mahmood also listened to Italian artists like Lucio Battisti, Lucio Dalla and Paolo Conte. He also cited Italian singer-songwriter Elisa as one of the major ispiration for his songrwirting works, Mahmood has cited American singer Frank Ocean as his biggest influence: "[His music] is very free and in which everyone can identify themselves, gay or straight, because the essential is the person and the energy that he transmits and not the sexual orientation". His other favourite artists include Beyoncé, Travis Scott, Jazmine Sullivan, Rosalía and SZA.

== Philanthropy and lawsuits ==
=== LGBTQ rights ===
Mahmood has consistently supported legislation promoting LGBTQ rights in Italy. In 2022, he publicly supported the a bill against homophobia, biphobia and transphobia – through a video campaign for Vanity Fair Italy, stating that he had personally been the victim of violent homophobic attacks whilst at school, a trial for sexual assault.

=== Witness in a sexual assault trial ===
In 2026, Mahmood appeared in the official court documents relating to the legal proceedings against fashion designer Riccardo Tisci, who is accused in the New York Supreme Court of alleged sexual assault and sexual abuse involving the administration of drugs to Patrick Cooper in New York on 29 June 2024. In the documents filed with the US District Court for the Southern District of New York, Alessandro Mahmood was summoned to appear at the trial as he was present at the time of the events and as a co-perpetrator in the delivery of a drink allegedly laced with drugs to Cooper. The singer initially refused to testify voluntarily, prompting the prosecution to invoke the Hague Convention to proceed with his testimony and his answers to sixty-four questions approved by the New York judge at an Italian court. On 20 May 2026, the prosecution revealed in a document filed with the Court that the private conversations via text and voice messaging exchanged between Tisci and Mahmood had not been handed over in full by the defence.

== Discography ==
=== Studio albums ===
- Gioventù bruciata (2019)
- Ghettolimpo (2021)
- Nei letti degli altri (2024)

== Filmography ==
=== Films ===
Year	Title	Role	Notes
2023	The Little Mermaid	Sebastian (voice)	Italian voice-over role

== Awards and nominations ==
Year	Ceremony	Category	Work	Result
2018	Sanremo Giovani	—N/a	"Gioventù bruciata"	1st place
2018	Sanremo Giovani	Critics' Award	"Gioventù bruciata"	Won
2019	Sanremo Music Festival	Big Artists	"Soldi"	1st place
2019	Sanremo Music Festival	Enzo Jannacci Award for Best Performance	"Soldi"	Won
2019	Sanremo Music Festival	Baglioni d'oro Award for Best Song	"Soldi"	Won
2019	Eurovision Song Contest	—N/a	"Soldi"	2nd place
2019	OGAE Poll	Best Song of Eurovision 2019	"Soldi"	Won
2019	Marcel Bezençon Awards	Composer Award	"Soldi"	Won
2019	Wind Music Awards	Triple Platinum Certified Single	"Soldi"	Won
2019	Wind Music Awards	Gold Certified Album	"Gioventù bruciata"	Won
2019	MTV Europe Music Awards	Best Italian Act	"Soldi"	Won
2022	Sanremo Music Festival	Big Artists	"Brividi"	1st place
2022	Eurovision Song Contest	—N/a	"Brividi"	6th place
2022	OGAE Poll	Best Song of Eurovision 2022	"Brividi"	2nd place
2024	Sanremo Music Festival	Big Artists	"Tuta gold"	6th place
2026	Nastro d'Argento	Best Original Song	"Le cose non dette"	Won

Awards and achievements
Preceded by Ermal Meta and Fabrizio Moro	Sanremo Music Festival winner 2019	Succeeded by Diodato
Preceded by Måneskin	Sanremo Music Festival winner with Blanco; 2022	Succeeded by Marco Mengoni
Preceded by Ermal Meta and Fabrizio Moro with "Non mi avete fatto niente"	Italy in the Eurovision Song Contest; 2019	Succeeded by Diodato with "Fai rumore"
Preceded by Måneskin with "Zitti e buoni"	Italy in the Eurovision Song Contest with Blanco; 2022	Succeeded by Marco Mengoni with "Due vite"
