= Davide Petrella =

Italian singer-songwriter and composer

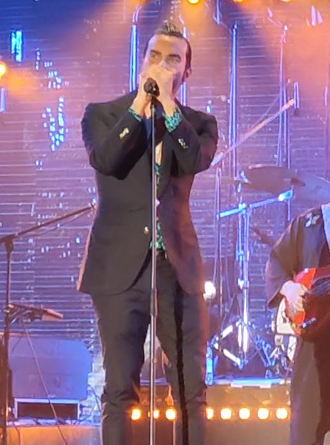
- Petrella in 2023
- Born: 6 August 1985 (age 41); Naples, Italy
- Occupations: Singer; songwriter; composer; lyricist

Davide Petrella (born 6 August 1985), also known as Tropico, is an Italian singer-songwriter, composer, and lyricist.

== Life and career ==
Born in Naples, Petrella started his career as founder and frontman of the band Le Strisce, with whom he recorded three albums. In 2014, he collaborated with Cesare Cremonini on the album Logico, and since then he became one of the most requested songwriters in Italy. Artists with whom he collaborated include Gianna Nannini, Elisa, Marracash, Jovanotti, Elodie, Mahmood, Sophie and the Giants, Giusy Ferreri, Emma Marrone, Alessandra Amoroso, Fabri Fibra, Achille Lauro, The Kolors, Fedez, J-Ax, Fred De Palma and Anitta.

At the 73rd edition of the Sanremo Music Festival two songs co-written by Petrella, Marco Mengoni's "Due vite" and Lazza's "Cenere", took the lead in the final ranking, respectively in first and second place; together with Mogol, Alberto Testa, Franco Migliacci, Cristiano Minellono and Zucchero Fornaciari, he is one of the few songwriters to hold this record.

Beyond his career as a songwriter for other artists, Petrella is also active as a singer-songwriter under the stage name Tropico.

== Discography ==
Studio albums

- Litigare (2018)
- Non esiste amore a Napoli (2021)
- Chiamami quando la magia finisce (2023)
- Soli e disperati nel mare meraviglioso (2025)

== Songwriting credits ==
List of songs written or co-written by Davide Petrella and performed by other artists
Title	Year	Artist	Album
"Logico n. 1" (Written by Cesare Cremonini and Davide Petrella)	2014	Cesare Cremonini	Logico
"GreyGoose" (Written by Cesare Cremonini and Davide Petrella)	2014	Cesare Cremonini	Logico
"Io e Anna" (Written by Cesare Cremonini and Davide Petrella)	2014	Cesare Cremonini	Logico
"John Wayne" (Written by Cesare Cremonini and Davide Petrella)	2014	Cesare Cremonini	Logico
"Vent'anni per sempre" (Written by Cesare Cremonini and Davide Petrella)	2014	Cesare Cremonini	Logico
"Cuore di cane" (Written by Cesare Cremonini and Davide Petrella)	2014	Cesare Cremonini	Logico
"Cos'hai nella testa?" (Written by Cesare Cremonini, Davide Petrella and Alessandro Magnanini)	2014	Cesare Cremonini	Logico
"Buon viaggio (Share the Love)" (Written by Cesare Cremonini, Davide Petrella and Alessandro Magnanini)	2015	Cesare Cremonini	Più che logico (Live)
"Lost in the Weekend" (Written by Cesare Cremonini and Davide Petrella)	2015	Cesare Cremonini	Più che logico (Live)
"Quasi quasi" (Written by Cesare Cremonini and Davide Petrella)	2015	Cesare Cremonini	Più che logico (Live)
"46" (Written by Cesare Cremonini and Davide Petrella)	2015	Cesare Cremonini	Più che logico (Live)
"Vorrei ma non posto" (Written by Alessandro Aleotti, Federico Lucia, Davide Petrella, Alessandro Merli and Fabio Clemente)	2016	J-Ax and Fedez	Comunisti col Rolex
"Il kaos è chiuso" (Written by Alessandro Aleotti, Federico Lucia, Davide Petrella, Dario Faini, Alessandro Merli and Fabio Clemente)	2017	J-Ax and Fedez	Comunisti col Rolex
"Devi morire" (Written by Alessandro Aleotti, Davide Petrella, Alessandro Merli and Fabio Clemente)	2017	J-Ax and Fedez	Comunisti col Rolex
"Perdere la testa" (Written by Alessandro Aleotti, Federico Lucia, Davide Petrella, Alessandro Merli and Fabio Clemente)	2017	J-Ax and Fedez feat. Giò Sada	Comunisti col Rolex
"Nuova luce" (Written by Davide Petrella and Dario Faini)	2017	Francesco Renga	Scriverò il tuo nome Live
"Pamplona" (Written by Fabrizio Tarducci, Davide Petrella, Dario Faini and Vanni Casagrande)	2017	Fabri Fibra feat. Thegiornalisti	Fenomeno
"Fenomenale" (Written by Gianna Nannini and Davide Petrella)	2017	Gianna Nannini	Amore gigante
"Cinema" (Written by Davide Petrella and Dario Faini)	2017	Gianna Nannini	Amore gigante
"Ogni istante" (Written by Elisa Toffoli and Davide Petrella)	2017	Elisa	Non-album single
"Poetica" (Written by Cesare Cremonini and Davide Petrella)	2017	Cesare Cremonini	Possibili scenari
"Possibili scenari" (Written by Cesare Cremonini and Davide Petrella)	2017	Cesare Cremonini	Possibili scenari
"Kashmir-Kashmir" (Written by Cesare Cremonini and Davide Petrella)	2017	Cesare Cremonini	Possibili scenari
"Un uomo nuovo" (Written by Cesare Cremonini and Davide Petrella)	2017	Cesare Cremonini	Possibili scenari
"Silent Hill" (Written by Cesare Cremonini and Davide Petrella)	2017	Cesare Cremonini	Possibili scenari
"Il cielo era sereno" (Written by Cesare Cremonini and Davide Petrella)	2017	Cesare Cremonini	Possibili scenari
"La isla" (Written by Cesare Cremonini and Davide Petrella)	2017	Cesare Cremonini	Possibili scenari
"Al tuo matrimonio" (Written by Cesare Cremonini and Davide Petrella)	2017	Cesare Cremonini	Possibili scenari
"La macchina del tempo" (Written by Cesare Cremonini and Davide Petrella)	2017	Cesare Cremonini	Possibili scenari
"Ragazzini per strada" (Written by Lorenzo Cherubini and Davide Petrella)	2017	Jovanotti	Oh, vita!
"Fame" (Written by Lorenzo Cherubini and Davide Petrella)	2017	Jovanotti	Oh, vita!
"Da sola/In the Night" (Written by Tommaso Paradiso, Davide Petrella, Alessandro Merli and Fabio Clemente)	2018	Takagi & Ketra feat. Tommaso Paradiso and Elisa	Non-album single
"Frida (mai, mai, mai)" (Written by Antonio Fiordispino, Alessandro Raina, Davide Petrella and Dario Faini)	2018	The Kolors	Non-album single
"Le ragazze come me" (Written by Davide Petrella and Dario Faini)	2018	Emma	Essere qui
"Effetto domino" (Written by Davide Petrella, Federica Abbate and Fabio Gargiulo)	2018	Emma	Essere qui
"Superare" (Written by Annalisa Scarrone and Davide Petrella)	2018	Annalisa	Bye Bye
"Lungomare latino" (Written by Cosimo Fini, Davide Petrella, Luigi Florio and Isak Haziri)	2018	Guè feat. Willy William	Non-album single
"Come le onde" (Written by Antonio Fiordispino, Alessandro Aleotti and Davide Petrella)	2018	The Kolors feat. J-Ax	Non-album single
"Italiana" (Written by Alessandro Aleotti, Federico Lucia, Davide Petrella, Alessandro Merli and Fabio Clemente)	2018	J-Ax and Fedez	Non-album single
"Tua per sempre" (Written by Davide Petrella)	2018	Elisa	Diari aperti
"L'estate è già fuori" (Written by Elisa Toffoli and Davide Petrella)	2018	Elisa	Diari aperti
"Con te mi sento così" (Written by Elisa Toffoli, Davide Petrella and Andrea Rigonat)	2018	Elisa	Diari aperti
"Come fossimo cowboy" (Written by Emiliano Giambelli, Davide Petrella, Federica Abbate and Massimiliano Dagani)	2018	Emis Killa	Supereroe
"Finalmente" (Written by Federica Abbate, Davide Petrella, Alfredo Rapetti, Alessandro Merli and Fabio Clemente)	2018	Federica Abbate	Non-album single
"Pensare male" (Written by Antonio Fiordispino, Davide Petrella, Livio Giovannucci and Anna Romano)	2019	The Kolors and Elodie	This Is Elodie
"Rolls Royce" (Written by Lauro De Marinis, Davide Petrella, Daniele Mungai and Edoardo Manozzi)	2019	Achille Lauro	1969
"Bugie diverse" (Written by Corrado Migliaro, Rosario Castagnola and Davide Petrella)	2019	CoCo	Acquario
"Vicinissimo" (Written by Davide Petrella and Dario Faini)	2019	Il Volo	Musica
"Calipso" (Written by Alessandro Mahmoud, Gionata Boschetti, Fabrizio Tarducci, Davide Petrella, Paolo Alberto Monachetti and Dario Faini)	2019	Charlie Charles and Dardust feat. Sfera Ebbasta, Mahmood and Fabri Fibra	Non-album single
"Camera con vista" (Written by Federica Abbate, Lorenzo Fragola, Davide Petrella, Alfredo Rapetti, Federico Palana, Stefano Tognini, Alessandro Merli and Fabio Clemente)	2019	Federica Abbate and Lorenzo Fragola	Non-album single
"Playa" (Written by Claudia Nahum, Federica Abbate, Davide Petrella and Stefano Tognini)	2019	Baby K	Donna sulla Luna
"Ostia Lido" (Written by Alessandro Aleotti, Daniele Del Pace, Davide Petrella, Alessandro Merli and Fabio Clemente)	2019	J-Ax	ReAle
"Una volta ancora" (Written by Federico Palana, Federica Abbate, Gianluca Ciccorelli, Davide Petrella, Alessandro Merli and Fabio Clemente)	2019	Fred De Palma feat. Ana Mena	Uebe
"Fanfare" (Written by Davide Petrella, Cosimo Fini and Michele Canova)	2019	Elettra Lamborghini feat. Guè	Twerking Queen
"Barrio" (Written by Alessandro Mahmoud, Davide Petrella, Dario Faini and Paolo Alberto Monachetti)	2019	Mahmood	Non-album single
"Tomorrow / Domani" (Written by Michael Holbrook Penniman Jr., Paul Dixon and Davide Petrella)	2019	Mika	My Name Is Michael Holbrook
"Los Angeles" (Written by Antonio Fiordispino, Cosimo Fini and Davide Petrella)	2019	The Kolors feat. Guè	Non-album single
"Mascara" (Written by Elisa Toffoli and Davide Petrella)	2019	Emma	Fortuna
"Quelli che non pensano - Il cervello" (Written by Fabio Rizzo, Silvano Albanese, Giulia Puzzo, Sebastiano Ruocco, Francesco Di Gesù, Davide Petrella and Gianluca Cranco)	2019	Marracash feat. Coez	Persona
"Bravi a cadere - I polmoni" (Written by Fabio Rizzo, Lorenzo Urciullo, Antonio Di Martino, Davide Petrella, Luca Serpenti, Alessandro Pulga and Stefano Tognini)	2019	Marracash	Persona
"Al telefono" (Written by Cesare Cremonini and Davide Petrella)	2019	Cesare Cremonini	Cremonini 2C2C - The Best of
"Giovane stupida" (Written by Cesare Cremonini and Davide Petrella)	2019	Cesare Cremonini	Cremonini 2C2C - The Best of
"Se apro gli occhi" (Written by Corrado Grilli, Davide Petrella, Valerio Bulla, Alessandro Cianci and Luca Antonio Barker)	2019	Mecna and Sick Luke	Neverland
"Pericoloso" (Written by Alessandro Aleotti, Chadia Darnakh Rodríguez, Davide Petrella, Alessandro Merli and Fabio Clemente)	2020	J-Ax feat. Chadia Rodríguez	ReAle
"Carioca" (Written by Raphael Gualazzi, Davide Petrella and Davide Pavanello)	2020	Raphael Gualazzi	Ho un piano
"Me ne frego" (Written by Lauro De Marinis, Davide Petrella, Daniele Dezi, Daniele Mungai, Edoardo Manozzi and Matteo Ciceroni)	2020	Achille Lauro	1969 – Achille Idol Rebirth
"Maleducata" (Written by Lauro De Marinis, Davide Petrella, Daniele Dezi, Gregorio Calculli and Mattia Ciceroni)	2020	Achille Lauro	1969 – Achille Idol Rebirth
"16 marzo" (Written by Lauro De Marinis, Davide Petrella, Daniele Dezi, Daniele Mungai and Mattia Ciceroni)	2020	Achille Lauro	1969 – Achille Idol Rebirth
"Musica (e il resto scompare)" (Written by Davide Petrella and Michele Canova)	2020	Elettra Lamborghini	Twerking Queen (el resto ed nada)
"Giu x terra" (Written by Ghali Amdouni, Davide Petrella, Simone Benussi and Andrea Venerus)	2020	Ghali	DNA
"DNA" (Written by Ghali Amdouni, Davide Petrella and Michele Canova)	2020	Ghali	DNA
"Barcellona" (Written by Ghali Amdouni, Davide Petrella and Michele Canova)	2020	Ghali	DNA
"Fallito" (Written by Ghali Amdouni, Davide Petrella and Michele Canova)	2020	Ghali	DNA
"Saturno" (Written by Nicola Albera, Davide Petrella and Luca Galeandro)	2020	Nitro	GarbAge
"Neon – Le ali" (Written by Fabio Rizzo, Elisa Toffoli, Davide Petrella, Alessandro Merli and Fabio Clemente)	2020	Marracash feat. Elisa	Persona (Digital reissue)
"Buenos Aires" (Written by Claudia Nahum, Davide Petrella and Stefano Tognini)	2020	Baby K	Donna sulla Luna
"Non è vero" (Written by Antonio Fiordispino and Davide Petrella)	2020	The Kolors	Non-album single
"Guaranà" (Written by Davide Petrella and Dario Faini)	2020	Elodie	This Is Elodie
"Vivo" (Written by Matteo Professione, Davide Petrella, Alessandro Pulga and Stefano Tognini)	2020	Ernia	Gemelli
"Defuera" (Written by Ghali Amdouni, Francesca Calearo, Fabio Rizzo, Davide Petrella and Dario Faini)	2020	Dardust feat. Ghali, Madame and Marracash	Non-album single
"Ciclone" (Written by Davide Petrella, Federica Abbate, Miky La Sensa, Alessandro Merli and Fabio Clemente)	2020	Takagi & Ketra, Elodie, Mariah and Gipsy Kings	Non-album single
"Paloma" (Written by Federico Palana, Federica Abbate, Davide Petrella, Gianluca Ciccorelli, Alessandro Merli and Fabio Clemente)	2020	Fred De Palma feat. Anitta	Unico
"Paura di me" (Written by Corrado Grilli, Davide Petrella, Stefano Tognini and Marco Ferrario)	2020	Mecna	Mentre nessuno guarda
"Dorado" (Written by Alessandro Mahmoud, Gionata Boschetti, Salomón Villada Hoyos, Davide Petrella and Dario Faini)	2020	Mahmood feat. Sfera Ebbasta and Feid	Ghettolimpo
"Latina" (Written by Edoardo D'Erme, Davide Petrella and Dario Faini)	2020	Emma	Fortuna (Digital reissue)
"Una voglia assurda" (Written by Alessandro Aleotti, Daniele Del Pace, Davide Petrella, Alessandro Merli and Fabio Clemente)	2020	J-Ax	ReAle
"Pezzo di cuore" (Written by Davide Petrella and Dario Faini)	2021	Emma and Alessandra Amoroso	Non-album single
"Zero" (Written by Alessandro Mahmoud, Davide Petrella and Dario Faini)	2021	Mahmood	Ghettolimpo
"Klan" (Written by Alessandro Mahmoud, Davide Petrella, Xavier Pérez, Marc Seguí and Dario Faini)	2021	Mahmood	Ghettolimpo
"Pesche" (Written by Federico Rossi, Davide Petrella, Eugenio Maimone, Leonardo Grillotti, Federico Mercuri and Giordano Cremona)	2021	Federico Rossi	Non-album single
"Mastroianni" (Written by Massimilaino Cellamaro, Michele Salvemini, Edoardo D'Erme, Davide Petrella, Massimiliano Dagani and Francesco Catitti)	2021	Sottotono	Originali
"Cabriolet Panorama" (Written by Antonio Fiordispino, Davide Petrella and Stefano Tognini)	2021	The Kolors	Non-album single
"Xy" (Written by Margherita Vicario, Davide Petrella and Davide Pavanello)	2021	Margherita Vicario feat. Elodie	Bingo
"Salsa" (Written by Alessandro Aleotti, Francesco Vigorelli, Davide Petrella, Daniele Lazzarin, Alessandro Merli and Fabio Clemente)	2021	J-Ax feat. Jake La Furia	SurreAle
"Che sogno incredibile" (Written by Davide Petrella and Michele Canova)	2021	Emma and Loredana Bertè	Best of Me
"Ma stasera" (Written by Marco Mengoni, Davide Petrella, Federica Abbate and Francesco Catitti)	2021	Marco Mengoni	Materia (Terra)
"Falene" (Written by Federica Abbate, Sophie Scott, Davide Petrella, Mike Kintish and Francesco Catitti)	2021	Michele Bravi and Sophie and the Giants	La geografia del buio
"Piuma" (Written by Alessandra Amoroso, Davide Petrella and Francesco Catitti)	2021	Alessandra Amoroso	Tutto accade
"Sorriso grande" (Written by Davide Petrella and Dario Faini)	2021	Alessandra Amoroso	Tutto accade
"Tutte le volte" (Written by Davide Petrella and Francesco Catitti)	2021	Alessandra Amoroso	Tutto accade
"Un altro ballo" (Written by Federico Palana, Federica Abbate, Davide Petrella, Alessandro Merli and Fabio Clemente)	2021	Fred De Palma feat. Anitta	Unico
"Vertigine" (Written by Elisa Toffoli, Davide Petrella and Dario Faini)	2021	Elodie	OK. Respira
"Come nelle canzoni" (Written by Silvano Albanese, Davide Petrella, Alfonso Climenti, Alessandro Pulga and Stefano Tognini)	2021	Coez	Volare
"Io" (Written by Fabio Rizzo, Vasco Rossi, Davide Petrella and Tullio Ferro)	2021	Marracash	Noi, loro, gli altri
"Nemesi" (Written by Fabio Rizzo, Riccardo Fabbriconi, Davide Petrella, Michele Zocca, Alessandro Pulga and Stefano Tognini)	2021	Marracash feat. Blanco	Noi, loro, gli altri
"Seta" (Written by Elisa Toffoli, Davide Petrella and Dario Faini)	2021	Elisa	Ritorno al futuro/Back to the Future
"Leggeri leggeri" (Written by Federico Lucia, Jacopo D'Amico, Davide Petrella and Davide Simonetta)	2021	Fedez	Disumano
"Colibrì" (Written by Cesare Cremonini and Davide Petrella)	2021	Cesare Cremonini	La ragazza del futuro
"La coda del diavolo" (Written by Mirko Martorana, Davide Petrella, Alessandro Pulga and Stefano Tognino)	2021	Rkomi feat. Elodie	Taxi Driver+
"Proibito" (Written by Marco Mengoni, Davide Petrella and Michele Canova)	2021	Marco Mengoni	Materia (Terra)
"A mezzanotte (Christmas Song)" (Written by Davide Petrella, Luca Faraone and Pablo Miguel Lombroni Capalbo)	2021	Elettra Lamborghini	Elettraton
"Domenica" (Written by Lauro De Marinis, Davide Petrella, Simon Pietro Manzari, Gregorio Calculli, Matteo Ciceroni and Mattia Cutolo)	2022	Achille Lauro	Lauro – Achille Idol Superstar
"Miele" (Written by Davide Petrella, Federica Abbate, Alessandro Merli and Fabio Clemente)	2022	Giusy Ferreri	Cortometraggi
"Ogni volta è così" (Written by Emma Marrone, Davide Petrella and Dario Faini)	2022	Emma	Non-album single
"O forse sei tu" (Written by Elisa Toffoli and Davide Petrella)	2022	Elisa	Ritorno al futuro/Back to the Future
"Come sei veramente" (Written by Elisa Toffoli, Davide Petrella, Andrea Rigonat and William Medini)	2022	Elisa	Ritorno al futuro/Back to the Future
"Litoranea" (Written by Elisa Toffoli, Edoardo D'Erme, Davide Petrella, Gaetano Scognamiglio and Simone Benussi)	2022	Elisa feat. Matilda De Angelis	Ritorno al futuro/Back to the Future
"Luglio" (Written by Elisa Toffoli and Davide Petrella)	2022	Elisa feat. Elodie, Giorgia and Roshelle	Ritorno al futuro/Back to the Future
"Come te nessuno mai" (Written by Elisa Toffoli and Davide Petrella)	2022	Elisa	Ritorno al futuro/Back to the Future
"La ragazza del futuro" (Written by Cesare Cremonini, Davide Petrella and Alessandro Magnanini)	2022	Cesare Cremonini	La ragazza del futuro
"MoonWalk" (Written by Cesare Cremonini and Davide Petrella)	2022	Cesare Cremonini	La ragazza del futuro
"La fine del mondo" (Written by Cesare Cremonini and Davide Petrella)	2022	Cesare Cremonini	La ragazza del futuro
"Chimica" (Written by Cesare Cremonini and Davide Petrella)	2022	Cesare Cremonini	La ragazza del futuro
"Stand Up Comedy" (Written by Cesare Cremonini and Davide Petrella)	2022	Cesare Cremonini	La ragazza del futuro
"Jeky" (Written by Cesare Cremonini and Davide Petrella)	2022	Cesare Cremonini	La ragazza del futuro
"Psyco" (Written by Cesare Cremonini and Davide Petrella)	2022	Cesare Cremonini	La ragazza del futuro
"Chiamala felicità" (Written by Cesare Cremonini and Davide Petrella)	2022	Cesare Cremonini	La ragazza del futuro
"Stripper" (Written by Lauro De Marinis, Daniele Dezi, Francesco Viscoco, Davide Petrella, Gregorio Calculli, Marco Lanciotti,)	2022	Achille Lauro	Non-album single
"Propaganda" (Written by Fabrizio Tarducci, Davide Petrella, Alessandro Pulga and Stefano Tognini)	2022	Fabri Fibra, Colapesce and Dimartino	Caos
"Nessuno" (Written by Fabrizio Tarducci, Davide Petrella, Rosario Castagnola and Sarah Tartuffo)	2022	Fabri Fibra	Caos
"Panico" (Written by Jacopo Lazzarini, Davide Petrella, Alessandro Merli and Fabio Clemente)	2022	Lazza	Sirio
"Blackout" (Written by Antonio Fiordispino and Davide Petrella)	2022	The Kolors	Non-album single
"Fortuna" (Written by Ghali Amdouni, Davide Petrella, Eugenio Maimone, Leonardo Grillotti, Federico Mercuri and Giordano Cremona)	2022	Ghali	Sensazione ultra
"No Stress" (Written by Marco Mengoni, Davide Petrella and Stefano Tognini)	2022	Marco Mengoni	Materia (Pelle)
"Camera 209" (Written by Davide Petrella, Monica Bragato, Alfred Azzetto, Laurent Brancowitz, Thomas Croquet, Frederic Moulin, Thomas Mars, Deck D'Arcy and Stefano Tognini)	2022	Alessandra Amoroso feat. DB Boulevard	Tutto accade (Digital reissue)
"Zodiaco" (Written by Davide Petrella, Federica Abbate and Francesco Catitti)	2022	Michele Bravi	Non-album single
"Piove in discoteca" (Written by Tommaso Paradiso, Davide Petrella and Dario Faini)	2022	Tommaso Paradiso	Non-album single
"Ossa rotte" (Written by Davide Petrella and Michele Zocca)	2022	Rkomi	Taxi Driver+ (Deluxe)
"Caramello" (Written by Rocco Pagliarulo, Miriam Doblas Muñoz, Federica Abbate, Davide Petrella and Stefano Tognini)	2022	Rocco Hunt, Elettra Lamborghini and Lola Índigo	Rivoluzione (Digital reissue)
"Occhi grandi grandi" (Written by Francesca Michielin, Davide Petrella and Stefano Tognini)	2022	Francesca Michielin	Cani sciolti
"Chiagne" (Written by Emanuele Palumbo, Jacopo Lazzarini, Davide Petrella, Alessandro Merli and Fabio Clemente)	2022	Geolier feat. Lazza and Takagi & Ketra	Il coraggio dei bambini
"Voce" (Written by Francesco Liccardo, Davide Petrella, Rocco Castagnola and Sarah Tartuffo)	2022	Franco Ricciardi	Je
"Je" (Written by Francesco Liccardo, Davide Petrella, Rocco Castagnola and Sarah Tartuffo)	2022	Franco Ricciardi	Je
"Notti blu" (Written by Davide Petrella and Stefano Tognini)	2022	Alessandra Amoroso	Tutto accade (Digital reissue)
"Bastava la metà" (Written by Matteo Professione, Gaia Gozzi, Cosimo Fini, Davide Petrella, Federica Abbate, Luca Faraone and Pablo Miguel Lombroni Capalbo)	2022	Ernia feat. Gaia and Guè	Io non ho paura
"Fluo" (Written by Giovanni Damian, Davide Petrella and Stefano Tognini)	2022	Sangiovanni	Non-album single
"Quelli come noi" (Written by Alberto Cotta Ramusino, Davide Petrella and Davide Simonetta)	2022	Tananai	Rave, eclissi
"Crisi di stato" (Written by Federico Lucia, Paolo Antonacci, Davide Petrella and Davide Simonetta)	2022	Fedez	Disumano (Digital reissue)
"Per non sentire la noia" (Written by Dario Lombardi, Duccio Caponi, Pietro Serafini, Jacopo Adamo, Marco Vittiglio, Andrea Locci, Davide Petrella and Julien Boverod)	2023	Bnkr44	Fuoristrada
"Due vite" (Written by Marco Mengoni, Davide Petrella and Davide Simonetta)	2023	Marco Mengoni	Materia (Prisma)
"Cenere" (Written by Jacopo Lazzarini, Davide Petrella and Dario Faini)	2023	Lazza	Sirio (Digital reissue)
"Purple in the Sky" (Written by Elodie Di Patrizi, Alessandro Mahmoud, Davide Petrella and Dario Faini)	2023	Elodie	OK. Respira
"Strobo" (Written by Elodie Di Patrizi, Davide Petrella and Dario Faini)	2023	Elodie	OK. Respira
"Mai più" (Written by Elodie Di Patrizi, Alessandro Mahmoud, Davide Petrella, Stefano Tognini and Dario Faini)	2023	Elodie	OK. Respira
"Ben & Jerry's" (Written by Ana Mena Rojas, Bruno Nicolas, David Augustave, Davide Petrella, José Luis de la Peña, Alessandro Pulga and Stefano Tognini)	2023	Ana Mena	Bellodrama
"Mañana Dios dirá" (Written by Ana Mena Rojos, Carlos Marrale, Piero Cassano, Bruno Nicolas, Davide Petrella, Davis Augustave, José Luis de la Peña and Stefano Tognini)	2023	Ana Mena	Bellodrama
"Italodisco" (Written by Antonio Fiordispino and Davide Petrella)	2023	The Kolors	Non-album single
"Fragole" (Written by Lauro De Marinis, Rosa Luini, Davide Petrella, Francesco Viscovo, Gregorio Calculli, Matteo Ciceroni and Simon Pietro Manzari)	2023	Achille Lauro and Rose Villain	Non-album single
"Pazza musica" (Written by Paolo Antonacci, Davide Petrella, Davide Simonetta and Stefano Tognini)	2023	Marco Mengoni and Elodie	Materia (Prisma)
"Parafulmini" (Written by Matteo Professione, Fabrizio Tarducci, Edoardo D'Erme, Davide Petrella and Stefano Tognini)	2023	Ernia, Bresh and Fabri Fibra	Io non ho paura (Digital reissue)
"Obladi oblada" (Written by Ghali Amdouni, Davide Mattei, Fabrizio Tarducci, Davide Petrella, Alessio Buongiorno, Francesco Di Giovanni and Paolo Alberto Monachetti)	2023	Charlie Charles feat. Ghali, thasup and Fabri Fibra	Non-album single
"Alta marea" (Written by Silvano Albanese, Francesco Servidei, Davide Petrella, Rosario Castagnola, Sarah Tartuffo and Pietro Paroletti)	2023	Coez and Frah Quintale	Lovebars
"90 Special" (Written by Andrea Arrigoni, Gionata Boschetti, Davide Petrella, Cesare Cremonini, Luca Faraone and Diego Vincenzo Vettraino)	2023	Drillionaire feat. Sfera Ebbasta and Shiva	10
"Melodia Criminal" (Written by Ana Mena Rojas, Federico Palana, Davide Petrella, Alessandro Merli and Fabio Clemente)	2023	Fred De Palma and Ana Mena	Non-album single
"Un'altra storia" (Written by Federico Bertollini, Davide Petrella and Francesco Catitti)	2023	Marco Mengoni (solo or feat. Franco126)	Materia (Prisma)
"Tutti" (Written by Edoardo D'Erme, Davide Petrella and Andrea Suriani)	2023	Calcutta	Relax
"Bruciasse il cielo" (Written by Riccardo Fabbriconi, Davide Petrella and Michele Zocca)	2023	Blanco	Innamorato
"Fragile" (Written by Gionata Boschetti, Davide Petrella and Diego Vincenzo Vettraino)	2023	Sfera Ebbasta	X2VR
"Anche stasera" (Written by Gionata Boschetti, Elodie Di Patrizi, Davide Petrella, Alessandro Merli, Fabio Clemente, Luca Faraone and Paolo Alberto Monachetti)	2023	Sfera Ebbasta feat. Elodie	X2VR
"Casa mia" (Written by Ghali Amdouni, Davide Petrella and Michele Zocca)	2024	Ghali	Non-album single
"Un ragazzo una ragazza" (Written by Antonio Fiordispino, Alessandro Fiordispino, Davide Petrella and Francesco Catitti)	2024	The Kolors	Non-album single
"Apnea" (Written by Emma Marrone, Paolo Antonacci, Davide Petrella and Julien Boverod)	2024	Emma	Souvenir (Extended)
"Click Boom!" (Written by Rosa Luini, Davide Petrella and Andrea Ferrara)	2024	Rose Villain	Radio Sakura
"Come un tuono" (Written by Rosa Luini, Cosimo Fini, Davide Petrella, Giorgio Pesenti and Andrea Ferrara)	2024	Rose Villain feat. Guè	Radio Sakura
"Nel tuo mare" (Written by Alessandro Mahmoud, Davide Petrella and Davide Simonetta)	2024	Mahmood	Nei letti degli altri
"L'ultima poesia" (Written by Emanuele Palumbo, Niccolò Moriconi, Davide Petrella, Gennaro Petito, Alessandro Merli, Fabio Clemente and Julien Boverod)	2024	Geolier and Ultimo	Dio lo sa
"Karma" (Written by Antonio Fiordispino, Davide Petrella, Alessandro Fiordispino, Lorenzo Santarelli, Marco Salvaderi and Dario Iaculli)	2024	The Kolors	Non-album single
"Peyote" (Written by Alessandro Aleotti, Fabrizio Tarducci, Rocco Pagliarulo, Davide Petrella, Paolo Antonacci and Stefano Tognini)	2024	Articolo 31 feat. Fabri Fibra and Rocco Hunt	Protomaranza
"Sesso e samba" (Written by Gaia Gozzi, Nicolò Rapisarda, Davide Petrella and Stefano Tognini)	2024	Tony Effe and Gaia	Icon
"Cinema spento" (Written by Ana Mena Rojas, Jacopo D'Amico, Davide Petrella, Alessandro Pulga and Stefano Tognini)	2024	Ana Mena feat. Dargen D'Amico	Non-album single
"Mezzo rotto" (Written by Davide Petrella, Marianna Mammone and Stefano Tognini)	2024	Alessandra Amoroso feat. BigMama	Io non sarei
"I t'o giur" (Written by Emanuele Palumbo, Gionata Boschetti, Davide Petrella and Dario Faini)	2024	Geolier feat. Sfera Ebbasta	Dio lo sa
"Passione" (Written by Federico Palana, Paolo Antonacci, Davide Petrella, Michele Zocca and Julien Boverod)	2024	Fred De Palma	Non-album single
"Certe cose" (Written by Jacopo Lazzarini, Davide Petrella, Riccardo Chiesa and Diego Vincenzo Vettraino)	2024	Lazza	Locura
"Ora che non ho più te" (Written by Cesare Cremonini and Davide Petrella)	2024	Cesare Cremonini	Alaska Baby
"Alaska Baby" (Written by Cesare Cremonini and Davide Petrella)	2024	Cesare Cremonini	Alaska Baby
"San Luca" (Written by Cesare Cremonini and Davide Petrella)	2024	Cesare Cremonini feat. Luca Carboni	Alaska Baby
"Streaming" (Written by Cesare Cremonini and Davide Petrella)	2024	Cesare Cremonini	Alaska Baby
"Limoni" (Written by Cesare Cremonini and Davide Petrella)	2024	Cesare Cremonini	Alaska Baby
"Acrobati" (Written by Cesare Cremonini and Davide Petrella)	2024	Cesare Cremonini	Alaska Baby
"Mai per sempre" (Written by Emanuele Palumbo, Davide Petrella and Dario Faini)	2024	Geolier	Dio lo sa - Atto II
"Mandare tutto all'aria" (Written by Marco Mengoni, Davide Petrella, Edoardo D'Erme and Andrea Suriani)	2024	Marco Mengoni	TBA
"Chiamo io chiami tu" (Written by Gaia Gozzi, Davide Petrella and Stefano Tognini)	2025	Gaia	Rosa dei venti
"Dimenticarsi alle 7" (Written by Elodie Di Patrizi, Davide Petrella and Davide Simonetta)	2025	Elodie	Mi ami mi odi
"Damme 'na mano" (Written by Nicolò Rapisarda, Davide Petrella, Luca Faraone and Diego Vincenzo Vettraino)	2025	Tony Effe	Icon (Digital reissue)
"Tu con chi fai l'amore" (Written by Antonio Fiordispino, Edoardo D'Erme, Davide Petrella and Stefano Tognini)	2025	The Kolors	Non-album single
"Ancora no" (Written by Federico Bertollini, Davide Petrella and Pietro Paroletti)	2025	Franco126	Futuri possibili
"Dirty Love" (Written by Lauro De Marinis, Davide Petrella, Francesco Viscovo, Simon Pietro Manzari, Gregorio Calculli, Matteo Ciceroni and Mattia Cutolo)	2025	Achille Lauro	Comuni mortali
"Nessuna" (Written by Luca Imprudente, Davide Petrella and Stefano Tognini)	2025	Luchè	Il mio lato peggiore
"Pronto come va" (Written by Antonio Fiordispino, Davide Petrella, Lorenzo Salvaderi, Alessandro Fiordispino and Dario Iaculli)	2025	The Kolors	Non-album single
"Che gusto c'è" (Written by Fabrizio Tarducci, Davide Petrella, Alessandro Pulga and Stefano Tognini)	2025	Fabri Fibra feat. Tredici Pietro	Mentre Los Angeles brucia
"Stupidi" (Written by Fabrizio Tarducci, Lorenzo Vinciguerra, Matteo Di Falco, Davide Petrella, Alessandro Pulga and Stefano Tognini)	2025	Fabri Fibra feat. Papa V and Nerissima Serpe	Mentre Los Angeles brucia
"Salsa piccante" (Written by Fabrizio Tarducci, Gaia Gozzi, Alessandro Vanetti, Davide Petrella, Alessandro Pulga and Stefano Tognini)	2025	Fabri Fibra feat. Gaia and Massimo Pericolo	Mentre Los Angeles brucia
"Milano Baby" (Written by Fabrizio Tarducci, Davide Petrella, Luca Giordano, Alessandro Pulga and Stefano Tognini)	2025	Fabri Fibra feat. Joan Thiele	Mentre Los Angeles brucia
"In auto alle 6:00" (Written by Emiliano Giambelli, Jacopo Lazzarini, Davide Petrella, Alessandro Merli and Fabio Clemente)	2025	Emis Killa feat. Lazza	TBA
"Golpe" (Written by Giorgia Todrani, Edoardo D'Erme, Davide Petrella, Gaetano Scognamiglio and Dario Faini)	2025	Giorgia	G
"Da denuncia" (Written by Matteo Professione, Fabio Rizzo, Davide Petrella, Alessandro Pulga, Stefano Tognini and Paolo Alberto Monachetti)	2025	Ernia feat. Marracash	Per soldi e per amore
"Giulia" (Written by Filippo Maria Fanti, Giuseppe Colonnelli, Davide Petrella, Giulio Nenna and Davide Epicoco)	2025	Irama	Antologia della vita e della morte
"Paura" (Written by Alessandro Mahmoud, Davide Petrella, Alessio Buongiorno and Paolo Alberto Monachetti)	2025	Charlie Charles feat. Mahmood	La bella confusione
"Attacchi di panico" (Written by Riccardo Fabbriconi, Davide Petrella, Alessio Buongiorno and Paolo Alberto Monachetti)	2025	Charlie Charles feat. Blanco	La bella confusione
"Fotografia" (Written by Emanuele Palumbo, Davide Petrella, Gennaro Petito and Vincenzo Marino)	2025	Geolier	Tutto è possibile
"Anche a vent'anni si muore" (Written by Riccardo Fabbriconi, Davide Petrella and Davide Simonetta)	2026	Blanco	Ma'
"Labirinto" (Written by Luca Imprudente, Davide Petrella and Stefano Tognini)	2026	Luchè	Il mio lato peggiore (digital reissue)
"I romantici" (Written by Tommaso Paradiso, Davide Petrella and Davide Simonetta)	2026	Tommaso Paradiso	Casa Paradiso (digital reissue)
"Rolling Stones" (Written by Antonio Fiordispino, Edoardo D'Erme and Davide Petrella)	2026	The Kolors	Non-album single
"Non dormo più" (Written by Fabrizio Tarducci, Francesco Servidei, Davide Petrella and Stefano Tognini)	2026	Fabri Fibra feat. Frah Quintale	Mentre Los Angeles brucia (Deluxe)

== Accolades ==
Ceremony	Year	Category	Nominated work	Result	Ref.
Sanremo Music Festival	2022	Best Music Composition	"O forse sei tu" (as a songwriter with Elisa Toffoli)	Won	
Targa Tenco	2022	Best Song	"O forse sei tu" (as a songwriter with Elisa Toffoli)	Won	
SIAE Music Awards	2023	Video Streaming Song Lyricist of the Year	Himself	Won	
SIAE Music Awards	2023	Audio Streaming Song Lyricist of the Year	Himself	Nominated	
SIAE Music Awards	2023	Best Radio Song	"La ragazza del futuro"	Nominated	
SIAE Music Awards	2023	Best Radio Song	"Litoranea"	Nominated	
SIAE Music Awards	2024	Best Radio Song	"Italodisco"	Won	
SIAE Music Awards	2024	Best Radio Song	"Parafulmini"	Nominated	
SIAE Music Awards	2024	Best Radio Song	"Pazza musica"	Nominated	
SIAE Music Awards	2024	Best Radio Song	"Cenere"	Nominated	
SIAE Music Awards	2024	Best Social Song	"Cenere"	Won	
SIAE Music Awards	2024	Best Social Song	"Due vite"	Nominated	
SIAE Music Awards	2024	Best Streaming Song	"Cenere"	Nominated	
SIAE Music Awards	2024	Best Streaming Song	"Due vite"	Nominated	
SIAE Music Awards	2024	Best Song for Clubs with live music	"Due vite"	Won	
