= Every Time =

Every Time or Everytime may refer to:

== Every Time ==
- Every Time (album), a 1998 album by Pam Tillis, or its title track
- "Every Time" (Janet Jackson song), 1997
- "Every Time", a 1986 song by the band Münchener Freiheit
- "Every Time", a 1991 song by Dana Dawson
- "Every Time", B-side of the 1993 Orchestral Manoeuvres in the Dark single "Everyday"

== Everytime ==
- "Everytime" (Tatyana Ali song), 1999
- "Everytime" (Butterfingers song), 2003
- "Everytime", a song by Britney Spears, 2004
- "Everytime" (The Kolors song), 2015
- "Everytime" (Ariana Grande song), 2018
- Everytime (film), a 2026 film by Sandra Wollner
- "Ready or Not/Everytime", by A1
- "Everytime", a 1992 song from Tear of Thought by Screaming Jets
- "Everytime", a 2004 song from Restored by Jeremy Camp
- "Everytime", a 2004 song from Still Not Getting Any... by Simple Plan
- "Everytime", a 2012 song from Heal by Loreen
- "Everytime", a 2013 song from You and Me by Shane Filan
- "Everytime", a 2016 song from Descendants of the Sun OST by Punch and Chen
- "Everytime", a 2024 song from Yuq1 by Yuqi and Minnie
- "Everytime", a 1962 song by Louise Cordet
- "Everytime", a 1962 song by Major Lance
- "Everytime", a 1966 song by The Del-Vetts
- "Everytime", a 1978 song by Jigsaw
- "Everytime", a 1997 song by Lustral
- "Everytime", a 2011 song by Jacynthe Millette-Bilodeau
