= Bingo (Margherita Vicario album) =

2021 studio album by Margherita Vicario

Studio album by Margherita Vicario
- Released: 14 May 2021
- Studio: Moka Bar Studio, White Studio
- Genre: Indie pop; pop
- Length: 44:40
- Language: Italian
- Label: Island Records, Universal
- Producer: Dade

Margherita Vicario chronology
Minimal Musical (2014)	Bingo (2021)	Gloria! (2024)

Singles from Bingo
- 1. "Abaué (morte di un trap boy)" Released: 16 January 2019; 2. "Mandela" Released: 12 April 2019; 3. "Romeo" Released: 12 July 2019; 4. "Giubbottino" Released: 17 January 2020; 5. "Pincio" Released: 17 April 2020; 6. "Piña colada" Released: 10 July 2020; 7. "Orango tango" Released: 18 February 2021; 8. "Come va" Released: 23 April 2021

Bingo is the second studio album by Italian singer-songwriter Margherita Vicario, released on 14 May 2021 by INRI and Island Records.

== Overview ==
The album, produced by Davide "Dade" Pavanello, was released seven years after Vicario's debut project and is the result of an extended studio effort that began in 2018.

The release was preceded by eight singles, issued between January 2019 and April 2021. Bingo was ranked fifteenth on Rolling Stone Italia's list of the 20 best Italian albums of the year.

== Tracklist ==
No.	Title	Lyrics	Music	Length
1.	"Bingo"	Margherita Vicario	Vicario; Davide Pavanello; Alberto Cipolla	1:50
2.	"Orango tango"	Vicario; Pavanello; Andrea Bonomo	Vicario; Pavanello	3:04
3.	"Come va"	Vicario	Vicario; Pavanello	2:42
4.	"Troppi preti troppe suore"	Vicario	Vicario; Pavanello	2:51
5.	"Xy" (featuring Elodie)	Vicario; Pavanello; Davide Petrella	Vicario; Pavanello	2:56
6.	"Fred Astaire"	Vicario	Vicario; Pavanello	3:22
7.	"DNA (Oh putain!)"	Vicario	Vicario; Pavanello	2:57
8.	"Come noi"	Vicario	Vicario; Pavanello; Cipolla	2:49
9.	"Abaué (morte di un trap boy)"	Vicario	Vicario; Pavanello	3:31
10.	"Mandela"	Vicario	Vicario; Pavanello	3:06
11.	"Romeo" (featuring Speranza)	Vicario; Pavanello; Ugo Scicolone	Vicario; Pavanello	3:49
12.	"Giubbottino"	Vicario	Vicario; Pavanello; Dario Faini	3:24
13.	"Pincio"	Vicario	Vicario; Pavanello	4:53
14.	"Piña Colada" (featuring Izi)	Vicario; Pavanello; Diego Germini	Vicario; Pavanello	3:26
Total length:				44:40

== Personnel ==
- Margherita Vicario – vocals
- Davide "Dade" Pavanello – production
- Gigi Barocco – mixing, mastering (except tracks 9–12)
- Alberto Cipolla – arrangements (tracks 1 and 8), backing vocals (track 1)
- Giulia Gaveglio – backing vocals (track 1)
- Simone Bertolotti – vocal recording (track 5)
- Simone Squillario – mixing, mastering (tracks 9–12)
- Dardust – production (track 12)
- Stefano "Piri" Colosimo – trumpet (track 14)

== Charts ==
Chart performance for Bingo
Chart (2021)	Peak position
Italian Albums (FIMI)	21

== Year-end lists ==
Selected year-end rankings of Bingo
Publication	List	Rank	Ref.
Rolling Stone	The 20 Best Italian Albums of 2021	15	
