= Italodisco (song) =

2023 single by the Kolors

Single by the Kolors
- Language: Italian
- Released: 5 May 2023
- Genre: Italo disco
- Length: 3:19
- Label: Warner
- Songwriters: Stash Fiordispino; Davide Petrella

The Kolors singles chronology
| "Blackout" (2022) | "Italodisco" (2023) | "Un ragazzo una ragazza" (2024) |

Music video
- "Italodisco" on YouTube

"Italodisco" is a song by Italian rock band The Kolors, released on 5 May 2023 through Warner. It topped the Italian chart in July 2023, and also reached the top 10 in Poland, Lithuania, Switzerland and Austria. The English version of the song was released on 15 September 2023, translated by Gary Go for Warner Music Group.

== Background and composition ==
The song was written by the group's frontman Antonio "Stash" Fiordispino with Davide Petrella. It marks the group's first single release under Warner Music Italy, after splitting from Island Records. In an interview with La Repubblica, the frontman Antonio "Stash" Fiordispino talked about the meaning of the song within the band's artistic journey and the commercial success achieved:

Nothing happens by coincidence: when I think about all the time we spent in the studio over the past year. But I don't forget the moments when it seemed impossible to think about that number one ahead of The Kolors. [...] Our path has been marked by strong moments like "Everytime" or "Pensare Male", but surely "Italodisco" is a milestone in our journey. It is the beginning of a new page for The Kolors. Ten years ago we were kids, today we are fathers of a family. There is a different awareness in what we do and the results we get, in knowing how to live in the moment. They say that to taste better bread you have to fast a couple of days, here, for us Italodisco is like a Paradise cake after a couple of years of dieting.

The lyrics of the song mention (Giorgio) Moroder, a famous Italian composer and disc jockey who pioneered disco music. Regarding the genesis of the song, Fiordispino stated:

"Italodisco" came out in a few hours while searching for a new sound that would result in an upgrade of our pop path. Innovating in pop is always a big challenge. While we were rehearsing the Synclavier in the studio, an arpeggiator started up that immediately stimulated our memory of that all-Italian sound that has always been for us the eternal sound of electronics. The simplicity of that upbeat synth, combined with the writing of lyrics and melodies that are daughters of the modern day, gave birth to "Italodisco".

The English version of the song, translated by Gary Go for Warner Music Group, was released on 15 September 2023. Some Italian cultural references including the groups Righeira and Festivalbar were not mentioned in the version.

== Critical reception and accolades ==
The song has been called a summer hit of 2023 by Italian music critics.

Paolo Giordano, writing for Il Giornale wrote that the band "are certainly not nostalgic and their song is clearly contemporary", calling it "spontaneous" and that it "does not drown in super production." Giordano also pointed out that compared to other summer songs, "Italodisco" "has a more solid structure, is not urban as is fashionable today, has lyrics that make sense and is proud to reconnect with the roots of Italian pop music."

Marianna Baroli of Panorama defined the song as a new chapter for the band, in which "straight bass drum and nostalgic vibes are mixed with sharp images and precise references to some trademarks of Italian disco music."

Gabriele Fazio of the Agenzia Giornalistica Italia reported that the song is half-successful, as the result is only a willingness to "use certain elements of it, totally irritating by the way, just to chase a hit" ultimately finding it "a superficial and useless operation." Claudio Cabona of Rockol, in reference to the reference to the italodisco genre, wrote that "it is not enough to pull out nostalgic vibes and synths to strongly evoke that great musical season."

The song was awarded the TIM Summer Hits prize at the TIM Music Awards 2023 and the EarOne Award for the most played song on Italian radio stations.

== Commercial performance ==
The song debuted at number 50 on the Italian singles chart on week 22 of 2023. It subsequently entered the top ten at number 8 in week 25 of 2023, becoming the band's third song to achieve this result after "Everytime" (2015) and "Frida (mai, mai, mai)" (2018). In week 28, the song reached the top of the chart, becoming the band's first Italian number one single.

The song also achieved international success, reaching the top ten in Lithuania and Austria, number four in Switzerland and number one on the Polish airplay chart.

== Charts ==
=== Weekly charts ===
Weekly chart performance for "Italodisco"
| Chart (2023–2024) | Peak position |
|---|---|
| Austria (Ö3 Austria Top 40) | 8 |
| Belarus Airplay (TopHit) | 1 |
| CIS Airplay (TopHit) | 2 |
| Czech Republic Airplay (ČNS IFPI) | 52 |
| Estonia Airplay (TopHit) | 61 |
| Hungary (Dance Top 40) | 13 |
| Italy (FIMI) | 1 |
| Kazakhstan Airplay (TopHit) | 2 |
| Latvia Airplay (LaIPA) | 12 |
| Lithuania (AGATA) | 6 |
| Lithuania Airplay (TopHit) | 1 |
| Moldova Airplay (TopHit) | 1 |
| Poland (Polish Airplay Top 100) | 1 |
| Poland (Polish Streaming Top 100) | 4 |
| Russia Airplay (TopHit) | 2 |
| Slovakia Airplay (ČNS IFPI) | 11 |
| Slovakia Singles Digital (ČNS IFPI) | 15 |
| Switzerland (Schweizer Hitparade) | 4 |
| Ukraine Airplay (TopHit) | 4 |

Weekly chart performance for "Italodisco (English Version)"
| Chart (2023) | Peak position |
|---|---|
| Estonia Airplay (TopHit) | 72 |
| Lithuania Airplay (TopHit) | 61 |
| Poland (Polish Streaming Top 100) | 50 |

=== Monthly charts ===
Monthly chart performance for "Italodisco"
| Chart (2023–2024) | Peak position |
|---|---|
| Belarus Airplay (TopHit) | 1 |
| CIS Airplay (TopHit) | 4 |
| Czech Republic (Rádio Top 100) | 60 |
| Kazakhstan Airplay (TopHit) | 4 |
| Lithuania Airplay (TopHit) | 1 |
| Moldova Airplay (TopHit) | 1 |
| Russia Airplay (TopHit) | 9 |
| Slovakia (Rádio Top 100) | 11 |
| Slovakia (Singles Digitál Top 100) | 20 |
| Ukraine Airplay (TopHit) | 6 |

=== Year-end charts ===
2023 year-end chart performance for "Italodisco"
| Chart (2023) | Position |
|---|---|
| Austria (Ö3 Austria Top 40) | 49 |
| Belarus Airplay (TopHit) | 54 |
| CIS Airplay (TopHit) | 42 |
| Italy (FIMI) | 8 |
| Kazakhstan Airplay (TopHit) | 145 |
| Lithuania Airplay (TopHit) | 4 |
| Poland (Polish Airplay Top 100) | 7 |
| Poland (Polish Streaming Top 100) | 14 |
| Russia Airplay (TopHit) | 49 |
| Switzerland (Schweizer Hitparade) | 47 |

2024 year-end chart performance for "Italodisco"
| Chart (2024) | Position |
|---|---|
| Belarus Airplay (TopHit) | 13 |
| CIS Airplay (TopHit) | 29 |
| Hungary (Dance Top 40) | 65 |
| Italy (FIMI) | 52 |
| Kazakhstan Airplay (TopHit) | 28 |
| Moldova Airplay (TopHit) | 5 |
| Poland (Polish Airplay Top 100) | 37 |
| Poland (Polish Streaming Top 100) | 37 |
| Russia Airplay (TopHit) | 37 |

2025 year-end chart performance for "Italodisco"
| Chart (2025) | Position |
|---|---|
| Belarus Airplay (TopHit) | 81 |
| CIS Airplay (TopHit) | 137 |
| Hungary (Dance Top 40) | 86 |
| Moldova Airplay (TopHit) | 135 |
| Poland (Polish Airplay Top 100) | 66 |

== Certifications ==
Certifications for "Italodisco"
| Region | Certification | Certified units/sales |
|---|---|---|
| Austria (IFPI Austria) | Platinum | 30,000^{‡} |
| Italy (FIMI) | 6× Platinum | 600,000^{‡} |
| Poland (ZPAV) | 2× Diamond | 500,000^{‡} |
| Switzerland (IFPI Switzerland) | Platinum | 20,000^{‡} |
^{‡} Sales+streaming figures based on certification alone.

== Release history ==
Release dates and formats for "Italodisco"
| Region | Date | Format(s) | Label(s) | Ref. |
|---|---|---|---|---|
| Various | 5 May 2023 | Digital download; streaming | Warner | |
| Italy | 5 May 2023 | Radio airplay | Warner | |

== Cover versions ==
- In November 2023, Nikos Band of Georgia produced a cover version of the song Kartuli Disco with lyrics referencing Georgian cultures, which received popularity in Georgia, Russia, Kazakhstan and Ukraine.

=== Nikos Band version ===
==== Decade-end charts ====
20s Decade-end chart performance
| Chart (2025–2026) | Position |
|---|---|
| Russia Streaming (TopHit) | 157 |
