= This Is Elodie =

Studio album by Elodie
- Released: 31 January 2020
- Recorded: 2018–2019
- Genres: Pop; hip hop; soul; urban
- Length: 48:24
- Label: Island Records
- Producers: Elodie; Big Fish; Daddy's Groove; DADE; Dardust; Davide Simonetta; Katoo; Generic Animal; Jason Rooney; Lazza; Low Kidd; Mace; Marco Zangirolami; Merk & Kremont; Michele Canova Iorfida; Neffa; Stash; Takagi & Ketra; Zef

Elodie chronology
Tutta colpa mia (2017)	This Is Elodie (2020)	OK. Respira (2023)

Singles from This Is Elodie
- 1. "Nero Bali" Released: 18 May 2018; 2. "Rambla" Released: 12 October 2018; 3. "Pensare male" Released: 15 March 2019; 4. "Margarita" Released: 12 June 2019; 5. "Non è la fine" Released: 8 January 2020; 6. "Mal di testa" Released: 23 January 2020; 7. "Andromeda" Released: 5 February 2020; 8. "Guaranà" Released: 13 May 2020

This Is Elodie is the third studio album by Italian singer Elodie, released by Island Records on 31 January 2020.

The album features collaborations with Gemitaiz, Marracash, Fabri Fibra, Margherita Vicario, Ernia, Michele Bravi, Gué Pequeno, Ghemon and The Kolors. It debuted at number six on the FIMI Albums Chart and was certified triple platinum in Italy. It was the best-selling female album of 2020 in Italy.

== Background ==
The project was realized between 2018 and 2019, during which Elodie recorded over seventy songs, selecting sixteen, composed by forty-five songwriters and seventeen producers like Dardust, Mahmood, Max Brigante, Jacopo Pesce, Neffa, Marracash, Levante and Takagi & Ketra. The album moves on various musical genres, from pop to hip hop to reggaeton, soul and urban. During an interview, the singer described the album as if it was her first musical project: "I worked at three hundred and sixty degrees, from the choice of sound to that of the lyrics, because I wanted them to speak like me in a raw, direct way. [...] It was my dream, the way I imagined myself, ever since I started. I met the songwriters, I told them about me, to find something that fits my personality".

== Promotion ==
The album was anticipated by some collaborations released between 2018 and 2019, including "Nero Bali" with Michele Bravi and Gué Pequeno and "Margarita" with Marracash; both were certified double platinum. The album also includes "Pensare male", recorded with The Kolors and certified platinum.

In January 2020 "Non è la fine" with Gemitaiz and "Mal di testa" with Fabri Fibra were released. Elodie participated with "Andromeda" at the Sanremo Music Festival 2020, a choice made by the singer and the record label in order to "break certain schemes of the Italian discography, which is sometimes a bit too lazy". The single later peaked at number six on the FIMI Singles Chart, being certified platinum.

On 13 May 2020 "Guaranà" was released as the eighth single and was included on the streaming reissue of the album, receiving a double disc of platinum.

== Critical reception ==
Professional ratings
Review scores
Source	Rating
All Music Italia	7.5/10 stars
Rockol	3.5/5 stars
OndaRock	5.5/10 stars

This Is Elodie received generally positive reviews from italian music critics, who appreciated the artist's ability to experiment with new musical genres.

Writing for All Music Italia, Fabio Fiume opined that "This Is Elodie" is "a well-finished, complete album, son of the times but with several songs that won't be old tomorrow". Mattia Marzi of Rockol wrote that Elodie has built herself "another identity" compared to previous projects, through an album in which she "seems to enjoy trying on many different outfits," resulting in a project that "has neither a center nor a precise or at least predominant sonic direction," concluding that This Is Elodie is "a snapshot of Italian pop 3.0."

Gabriele Antonucci, reviewing the album for Panorama, described the album as "'curated, fresh and engaging,'" in which the singer "showcases growth" both vocally and in terms of artistic choices. Antonucci appreciated the different musical genres present, conceived as a "palette full of different colors." Luca Dondoni of La Stampa also dwelled on the different sounds of the album, describing it as "an ambitious project" for the singer. Gabriele Fazio of Agenzia Giornalistica Italia pointed out that although the nature of the album is "unashamedly commercial," the project turns out to be "enjoyable" and with "an intuition that goes far beyond the catchphrase sound."

== Track listing ==
This Is Elodie – standard track listing
No.	Title	Lyrics	Music	Producer(s)	Length
1.	"Andromeda"	Alessandro Mahmoud	Dario Faini	Dardust	3:22
2.	"Non è la fine" (featuring Gemitaiz)	Gulia Lenti; Davide De Luca	Giuseppe D'Albenzio	Jason Rooney	3:10
3.	"Vocale #1"				0:16
4.	"Margarita" (with Marracash)	Lorenzo Fragola; Carlo Coraggio; Federico Bertollini; Fabio Rizzo	Alessandro Merli; Fabio Clemente	Takagi & Ketra	2:57
5.	"Lupi mannari"	Simone Cremonini	Stefano Tognini	Zef	3:04
6.	"Mal di testa" (with Fabri Fibra)	Giovanni Pellino; Fabrizio Tarducci	Pellino; Tarducci	Neffa	2:37
7.	"Sposa" (featuring Margherita Vicario)	Margherita Vicario; Gianluca Servetti	Davide Pavanello	DADE	2:56
8.	"Vocale #2"				0:35
9.	"Vado a ballare da sola" (featuring Lazza and Low Kidd)	Riccardo Scirè; Adel Al Kassem; Jacopo Lazzarini	Scirè; Al Kassem; Lazzarini; Lorenzo Paolo Spinosa	Lazza; Low Kidd	3:22
10.	"Apposta per noi"	Davide Simonetta; Gianluca Fiorulli; Stefano Paviani	Simonetta; Fiorulli; Paviani	Michele Canova	3:16
11.	"Superbowl"	Gianluigi Fazio; Edwyn Roberts; Leonardo Pari; Marco Zitelli	Fazio; Roberts; Pari; Zitelli	Katoo	2:10
12.	"Diamanti" (featuring Ernia)	Alex Andrea Vella; Emanuele Lovito; Matteo Professione	Massimiliano Dagani	Big Fish	2:57
13.	"Lontano"	Andrea Bonomo; Enrico Zoni; Roberto Casalino	Bonomo; Zoni; Casalino	Big Fish	3:16
14.	"Vocale #3"				0:22
15.	"Nero Bali" (with Michele Bravi and Guè)	Mahmoud; Cosimo Fini	Faini; Vanni Casagrande	Dardust	3:03
16.	"Rambla" (featuring Ghemon)	Alessandro Raina; Giovanni Luca Picariello; Simonetta	Raina; Simonetta	Simonetta	3:20
17.	"Pensare male" (with The Kolors)	Antonio Fiordispino; Davide Petrella	Fiordispino; Petrella; Anna Romano; Livio Giovannucci	Stash; Daddy's Groove	3:29
18.	"Niente canzoni d'amore"	Rizzo; Federica Abbate	Piermarco Gianotti	Marco Zangirolami	3:25
19.	"In fondo non c'è"	Claudia Lagona; Antonio Filippelli; Fabrizio Martorelli	Lagona; Filippelli; Martorelli	Generic Animal	3:47
Total length:					48:24

This Is Elodie – bonus digital tracks
No.	Title	Length
20.	"Andromeda" (Merk & Kremont x BB Team Remix)	2:58
21.	"Andromeda RMX" (featuring Madame)	3:30

This Is Elodie – bonus streaming tracks
No.	Title	Lyrics	Music	Producer(s)	Length
1.	"Guaranà"	Petrella	Faini	Dardust	3:14

== Charts ==
=== Weekly charts ===
Weekly chart performance for This Is Elodie
Chart (2020)	Peak position
Italian Albums (FIMI)	6

=== Year-end charts ===
Year-end chart performance for This Is Elodie
Chart (2020)	Position
Italian Albums (FIMI)	22

== Certifications ==
Certifications for This Is Elodie
Region	Certification	Certified units/sales
Italy (FIMI)	3× Platinum	150,000^{‡}
^{‡} Sales+streaming figures based on certification alone.
