= Tu con chi fai l'amore =

Single by the Kolors
- Language: Italian
- Released: 12 February 2025
- Genre: Dance-pop; Italo disco; funk
- Length: 3:31
- Label: Warner
- Composers: Davide Petrella; Calcutta; Zef
- Lyricists: Stash; Davide Petrella
- Producers: Stash; Zef

The Kolors singles chronology
"Karma" (2024)	"Tu con chi fai l'amore" (2025)	"Pronto come va" (2025)

Music video
- "Tu con chi fai l'amore" on YouTube

"Tu con chi fai l'amore" ("Who Do You Make Love With") is a 2025 song by Italian pop rock band the Kolors. It was written by the band's frontman Stash with Davide Petrella, Calcutta and Zef, and released by Warner on 12 February 2025.

The song competed in the Sanremo Music Festival 2025, ultimately placing 14th. It marked the band's third participation on the contest, the first since "Un ragazzo una ragazza" in 2024.

== Composition ==
The song, written by the band's frontman Antonio Stash Fiordispino, Tropico, Calcutta and Zef, the latter also a producer, was described by the group in a press conference:

"It's our way of celebrating the moments where instinct guides us and not patterns. Everything that is unexpected. It's a song that kind of wants to celebrate those moments when instinct drives and not reasoning, and it wants to celebrate that kind of carefreeness that you feel in those moments."

== Music video ==
A music video of "Tu con chi fai l'amore", directed by Marc Lucas, was released on 12 February 2025 via The Kolors's YouTube channel.

== Charts ==
=== Weekly charts ===
Weekly chart performance for "Tu con chi fai l'amore"
Chart (2025)	Peak position
Italy (FIMI)	6
Italy Airplay (EarOne)	1

=== Year-end charts ===
Year-end chart performance for "Tu con chi fai l'amore"
Chart (2025)	Position
Italy (FIMI)	26

== Certifications ==
Certifications for "Tu con chi fai l'amore"
Region	Certification	Certified units/sales
Italy (FIMI)	Platinum	200,000^{‡}
^{‡} Sales+streaming figures based on certification alone.
