= Cabriolet Panorama =

2021 song by The Kolors

Single by The Kolors

from the album Singles
- Language: Italian
- Released: 30 April 2021
- Length: 2:58
- Label: Island
- Songwriters: Antonio "Stash" Fiordispino; Davide Petrella; Zef
- Producer: Zef

The Kolors singles chronology
| "Mal di gola" (2021) | "Cabriolet Panorama" (2021) | "Solero" (2021) |

Music video
- "Cabriolet Panorama" on YouTube

"Cabriolet Panorama" is a 2021 song by Italian pop rock band The Kolors. It was released by Island Records on 30 April 2021 and later included in the compilation album Singles. The song was written by the band's frontman Stash Fiordispino with Davide Petrella and produced by Zef.

The song peaked at number 45 on the Italian singles chart and was certified platinum in Italy.

== Music video ==
A music video of "Cabriolet Panorama" was released on the same day via The Kolors's YouTube channel. It was directed by Marc Lucas and Igor Grbesic, and shot in the Amalfi Coast.

== Charts ==
Weekly chart performance for "Cabriolet Panorama"
| Chart (2021) | Peak position |
|---|---|
| Italy (FIMI) | 45 |
| Italy Airplay (EarOne) | 13 |

== Certifications ==
| Region | Certification | Certified units/sales |
|---|---|---|
| Italy (FIMI) | Platinum | 70,000^{‡} |
^{‡} Sales+streaming figures based on certification alone.
