= Guaranà (song) =

Single by Elodie

from the album This Is Elodie (digital re-issue)
- Released: 13 May 2020
- Genre: Dancehall
- Length: 3:14
- Label: Universal
- Songwriters: Davide Petrella; Dario Faini
- Producer: Dardust

Elodie singles chronology
"Andromeda" (2020)	"Guaranà" (2020)	"Ciclone" (2020)

Music video
- "Guaranà" on YouTube

"Guaranà" is a song recorded by Italian singer Elodie. It was released by Universal Music on 13 May 2020 and included in the digital re-issue of Elodie's third studio album This Is Elodie.

It was written by Dardust and Davide Petrella, and produced by Dardust.

== Music video ==
The music video for the song was released on YouTube on 16 May 2020. It was directed by Attilio Cusani and shot in Sabaudia and the Circeo National Park.

== Charts ==
=== Weekly charts ===
Weekly chart performance for "Guaranà"
Chart (2020)	Peak position
Italy (FIMI)	13
Italy Airplay (EarOne)	1

=== Year-end charts ===
Year-end chart performance for "Guaranà"
Chart (2020)	Position
Italy (FIMI)	30

== Certifications ==
Region	Certification	Certified units/sales
Italy (FIMI)	2× Platinum	140,000^{‡}
^{‡} Sales+streaming figures based on certification alone.
