= O forse sei tu =

Single by Elisa

from the album Ritorno al futuro/Back to the Future
- Released: February 3, 2022
- Recorded: 2018–2021
- Genre: Pop
- Length: 3:53
- Label: Universal; Island
- Songwriters: Elisa Toffoli; Davide Petrella
- Producer: Andrea Rigonat

Elisa singles chronology
"Seta" (2021)	"O forse sei tu" (2022)	"Litoranea" (2022)

Music video
- "O forse sei tu" on YouTube

"O forse sei tu" (Italian pronunciation: [o (f)ˈforse ˌsɛi ˈtu]; transl. "Or maybe it is you") is a song by Italian singer-songwriter Elisa. Written by Elisa Toffoli and Davide Petrella, the song was released by Universal Music and Island Records on February 3, 2022, as Elisa's entry for the Sanremo Music Festival 2022. "O forse sei tu" is produced by Andrea Rigonat. It serves also as the second single from Elisa's eleventh studio album, Ritorno al futuro/Back to the Future. Musically, "O forse sei tu" is a pop ballad.

Giulio Rosati directed the music video for "O forse sei tu", which shows Elisa in a forest during a sunset. Photography took place primarily in Livorno in Tuscany.

"O forse sei tu" won the "Giancarlo Bigazzi" Award for the best musical composition and ranked second overall at the Sanremo Music Festival 2022. It also entered on Italian charts from 14th place, peaked in 4th place in the second week following its release and was the second most streamed song on Spotify in Italy on the day of its release.

== Background and release ==
"O forse sei tu" was written initially in English in 2018 by Elisa herself with singer Davide Petrella and it was produced by Elisa's husband Andrea Rigonat. The song was subsequently translated into Italian between 2018 and 2021. It marked Elisa's second attempt at the Sanremo Music Festival, after winning the Sanremo Music Festival 2001 with the song "Luce (Tramonti a nord est)". In the Sanremo Music Festival 2022, the song was performed live with an orchestra directed by Will Medini.

== Critical reception ==
"O forse sei tu" received widespread acclaim from music critics in Italy upon its release. Gino Castaldo of La Repubblica noted that "what comes straight and strong from Elisa's song is the emotion of music itself, a form of devotion, of deep and indestructible respect". Subsequently, the journalist finds that "[Elisa's] music makes us fly, high up until we are no longer afraid of [the height], as if life was to learn to believe in beauty through music". Il Messaggero were struck by the song's verses, which they describe as "simple but very beautiful and fitting into the tradition of Italian pop songs". They also observe a positive similarity in the verses with Amedeo Minghi and Mietta's 1990 song "Vattene amore", finding that both songs are love stories with full of promises and optimistic imagery.

Andrea Conti of Il Fatto Quotidiano appreciates the instrumental use of the piano in the song, highlighting that it is "an intimate, delicate, powerful song". Andrea Laffranchi from Corriere della Sera also appreciates both the piano and the strings. Laffranchi also notes that Elisa's voice makes him get goosebumps.

Francesco Prisco, writing for Il Sole 24 Ore, sees the piece as a "piano ballad with an epic melody refrain". Francesco Chignola of TV Sorrisi e Canzoni describes the song as "enchanting" on which "the voice of the Friulian artist moves through a thousand shades with splendid clarity", focusing on the fact that it represents "a hymn to life and feelings that make it worthy of be lived ".

All Music Italia appreciates the text, calling it a "classic" capable of "describing that fullness that only love gives". Il Giorno was pleasantly impressed "by the Toffoli-Petrella couple" and they described "O forse sei tu" as a poignant pop ballad, a secular prayer that enjoys the favour of forecasts.

== Music video ==
The official music video of "O forse sei tu" was released on 3 February 2022 on Elisa's official YouTube channel. Directed by Giulio Rosati, the music video of the song was recorded in the town of Cecina in Livorno, Tuscany. Rosati explains that the choice of Cecina was dictated by the fact that Elisa intended to make a tribute to the music video of "Luce (Tramonti a nord est)", with which she won the Sanremo Music Festival 2001. The director notes that in the video of "Luce (Tramonti a nord est)", Elisa was seen dancing with another human figure. For this new song, he therefore intended to create a dance with light "in order to make everything more ethereal" while paying homage to Elisa's 2001 song.

The video starts with a shot of trees in a bush, which is followed by a close-up shot of Elisa sitting on a log. Through the video, Elisa sings, dances and wanders in the bush during sunset. The video also includes shots after nightfall with shadows dancing on trees. In the end, Elisa reaches a beach at sunset. She wears a long white dress, designed by the creative director of Valentino, Pierpaolo Piccioli.

== Track listing ==
Digital download
No.	Title	Length
1.	"O forse sei tu"	3:53

== Credits and personnel ==
Credits adapted from Schweizer Hitparade and an article on the website of Radio Italia.

- Elisa – vocals, songwriter
- Davide Petrella – writer
- Andrea Rigonat – producer
- Will Medini – orchestra director, mixing of strings

== Charts ==
=== Weekly charts ===
Weekly chart performance for "O forse sei tu"
Chart (2022)	Peak position
Global Excl. U.S. (Billboard)	103
Italy (FIMI)	4
Italy Airplay (EarOne)	3
San Marino (SMRRTV Top 50)	5
Switzerland (Schweizer Hitparade)	37

=== Year-end charts ===
Year-end chart performance for "O forse sei tu"
Chart (2022)	Position
Italy (FIMI)	41

== Certifications ==
Region	Certification	Certified units/sales
Italy (FIMI)	2× Platinum	200,000^{‡}
^{‡} Sales+streaming figures based on certification alone.

== Release and radio history ==
Region	Date	Format	Version	Label
Italy	3 February 2022	Digital download and radio	Original	Universal Music
