= Andromeda (Elodie song) =

Single by Elodie

from the album This Is Elodie
- Released: 5 February 2020
- Genre: R&B; pop
- Length: 3:22
- Label: Universal; Island
- Songwriters: Alessandro Mahmoud; Dario Faini
- Producer: Dardust

Elodie singles chronology
"Mal di testa" (2020)	"Andromeda" (2020)	"Guaranà" (2020)

Music video
- "Andromeda" on YouTube

"Andromeda" is a song recorded by Italian singer Elodie. It was released by Universal Music Group and Island Records on 5 February 2020 as the seventh single from her third studio album This Is Elodie.

It was written by Dardust and Mahmood and produced by Dardust. The song served as Elodie's entry for the Sanremo Music Festival 2020, the 70th edition of Italy's musical festival which doubles also as a selection of the act for Eurovision Song Contest, where it placed 7th in the grand final. "Andromeda" peaked at number 6 on the Italian FIMI Singles Chart and was certified platinum in Italy.

== Background ==
In "Andromeda", Elodie talks about a relationship with a man older than her, but still unable to take on a serious relationship. The title refers to the constellation of the same name, closely linked to Greek mythology. OptiMagazine described the song's chorus as "exquisitely catchy", praising its production. Billboard Italia described it as "one of the most modern and structurally complex songs" of the Sanremo 2020 Festival. On 9 April 2020, an EP was released containing two remixes of the song in collaboration with Madame and Merk & Kremont.

== Music video ==
The music video for the song, directed by Attilio Cusani, was released on YouTube on 5 February 2020.

== Track listing ==
Digital download
No.	Title	Length
1.	"Andromeda"	3:22

Digital download
No.	Title	Length
1.	"Andromeda (RMX)" (with Madame)	2:58

== Charts ==
=== Weekly charts ===
Chart performance for "Andromeda"
Chart (2020)	Peak position
Italy (FIMI)	6
Italy Airplay (EarOne)	1

=== Year-end charts ===
Chart (2020)	Position
Italy (FIMI)	82

== Certifications ==
Region	Certification	Certified units/sales
Italy (FIMI)	Platinum	70,000^{‡}
^{‡} Sales+streaming figures based on certification alone.
