= Pensare male =

2019 song by The Kolors and Elodie

Single by The Kolors and Elodie

from the album Singles and This Is Elodie
- Language: Italian
- Released: 15 March 2019
- Genre: Synth pop; funk
- Length: 2:58
- Label: Island
- Songwriters: Antonio Fiordispino; Davide Petrella; Daniele Mona; Anna Romano; Livio Giovanucci; Carlo Grieco; Peppe Folliero
- Producer: Daddy's Groove

The Kolors singles chronology
"Come le onde" (2018)	"Pensare male" (2019)	"Los Angeles" (2019)

Elodie singles chronology
"Rambla" (2018)	"Pensare male" (2019)	"Margarita" (2019)

Music video
- "Pensare male" on YouTube

"Pensare male" is a song by Italian pop rock band The Kolors and Italian singer Elodie. It was released by Island Records on 15 March 2019 and later included in Elodie's third studio album This Is Elodie (2020) and in The Kolors' first compilation Singles (2021).

The song peaked at number 24 on the Italian singles chart and was certified platinum in Italy.

== Music video ==
A music video of "Pensare male", directed by Attilio Cusani, was released on 27 March 2019 via The Kolors's YouTube channel.

== Charts ==
=== Weekly charts ===
Weekly chart performance for "Pensare male"
Chart (2019)	Peak position
Italy (FIMI)	24
Italy Airplay (EarOne)	1

=== Year-end charts ===
Year-end chart performance for "Pensare male"
Chart (2019)	Position
Italy (FIMI)	76

== Certifications ==
Region	Certification	Certified units/sales
Italy (FIMI)	Platinum	50,000^{‡}
^{‡} Sales+streaming figures based on certification alone.
