= Pronto come va =

2025 song by The Kolors

Single by the Kolors
- Language: Italian
- Released: 16 May 2025
- Length: 2:57
- Label: Warner
- Composers: Alessandro Fiordispino; Dario Iaculli; Gabriel "Kende" Rossi; Marco Salvaderi; Lorenzo Santarelli
- Lyricists: Antonio "Stash" Fiordispino; Davide Petrella
- Producers: The Kolors; Room9

The Kolors singles chronology
| "Tu con chi fai l'amore" (2025) | "Pronto come va" (2025) | "The Riddle" (2025) |

Music video
- "Pronto come va" on YouTube

"Pronto come va" (transl. "Hello, what's up") is a 2025 song by Italian pop rock band the Kolors. It was written by the band's members with Davide Petrella, Lorenzo Santarelli, Marco Salvaderi and Kende, and was released by Warner Music on 16 May 2025.

== Music video ==
A music video of "Pronto come va" was released on the same day via The Kolors's YouTube channel. It was directed by YouNuts! and shot during several weddings in the Naples area.

== Charts ==
Weekly chart performance for "Pronto come va"
| Chart (2025) | Peak position |
|---|---|
| Italy (FIMI) | 30 |
| Italy Airplay (EarOne) | 1 |
