= Seta (song) =

Single by Elisa

from the album Ritorno al futuro/Back to the Future
- Released: 24 November 2021
- Recorded: 2021
- Genre: Synth pop
- Length: 3:33
- Label: Universal; Island
- Songwriters: Elisa Toffoli; Davide Petrella
- Producer: Dardust

Elisa singles chronology
"Rubini" (2021)	"Seta" (2021)	"O forse sei tu" (2022)

Music video
- "Seta" on YouTube

"Seta" is a song by Italian singer-songwriter Elisa. It was released by Universal Music Italia and Island Records on 24 November 2021 as the lead single from Elisa's eleventh studio album, Ritorno al futuro/Back to the Future.

== Background and composition ==
After the publication of the reissue of Diari aperti (2019), Elisa took a solo discographic break, working as a songwriter and producer on several artists' albums, including Fortuna, Feat (stato di natura), OK. Respira, Guesus and collaborating on Neon – Le ali with Marracash and "Rubini" with Mahmood. In November 2021 Elisa announced the new single "Seta" and the upcoming eleventh studio album.

The song, written by Elisa, Davide Petrella, and produced by Dardust, is electropop and synth-pop, almost with dance-pop influences, showing a change in the singer discography's sounds. The singer explained the meaning of the song and the process of writing and composing the it:

"I remember vividly that Davide Petrella, [...] with his perpetual air of defiance said to us, "Let's do another one now. Let's do one thing without thinking about anything. Out of the box, free to do everything wrong." That last sentence lit up my remotest cells and I recognized that oh-so-familiar impulse of wanting to do, of the almost physical need to materialize emotion, almost to get rid of it. [...] We were electric, happy as little children, and I don't know about the others, but I was also a little drained and finally calm, as I always am after I've written something I like so much."

== Critics reception ==
Andrea Laffranchi of Corriere della Sera described the song as "a song about falling in love, about the sounds and scents associated with that magical meeting, about emotions and anticipation."

== Music video ==
The music video, directed by Attilio Cusani and Elisa with art direction by Pierpaolo Piccioli, was released at the same time as the single's release through the singer's YouTube channel. The video deals with the issues of violence against women and rape, a message which was explained by the singer in an interview with Corriere della Sera:

"The energy that emanates from the hands of the protagonist represents [...] a superheroine as are all women who denounce situations of mistreatment. The colors are a symbolic trace: Pierpaolo has classically associated the female with pink and the male with blue. At the moment of her reaction, pink becomes red, meaning strength, blood. [...] When everything becomes intoxicated by aggression, for the male comes green, the color of poison."

== Charts ==
Chart performance for "Seta"
Chart (2022)	Peak position
Italy Airplay (EarOne)	2
San Marino (SMRRTV Top 50)	1
