= Margarita (Elodie song) =

2019 song by Elodie

Single by Elodie and Marracash

from the album This Is Elodie
- Language: Italian
- Released: 12 June 2019
- Genre: Reggae pop
- Length: 2:57
- Label: Island
- Songwriters: Lorenzo Fragola; Carlo Luigi Coraggio; Federico Bertollini; Fabio Rizzo; Alessandro Merli; Fabio Clemente
- Producer: Takagi & Ketra

Elodie singles chronology
"Pensare male" (2019)	"Margarita" (2019)	"Non è la fine" (2020)

Marracash singles chronology
"F.A.K.E." (2019)	"Margarita" (2019)	"Marylean" (2019)

Music video
- "Margarita" on YouTube

"Margarita" is a song recorded by Italian singer Elodie and Italian rapper Marracash, written by the latter with Lorenzo Fragola, Carl Brave, and Franco126, and produced by Takagi & Ketra. The song was released by Island Records on 12 June 2019 as the fourth single from Elodie's third studio album This Is Elodie (2020).

It peaked at number 6 on the Italian singles chart and was certified triple platinum in Italy.

== Music video ==
A music video of "Margarita" was released on 13 June 2019 via Elodie's YouTube channel.

== Charts ==
=== Weekly charts ===
Weekly chart performance for "Margarita"
Chart (2019)	Peak position
Italy (FIMI)	6
Italy Airplay (EarOne)	1

=== Year-end charts ===
Year-end chart performance for "Margarita"
Chart (2019)	Position
Italy (FIMI)	30

== Certifications ==
Region	Certification	Certified units/sales
Italy (FIMI)	3× Platinum	210,000^{‡}
^{‡} Sales+streaming figures based on certification alone.
