= Out (Kolors album) =

2015 studio album by the Kolors

Studio album by the Kolors
- Released: 19 May 2015
- Genre: Funk rock
- Length: 37:30
- Label: Baraonda Edizioni Musicali

The Kolors chronology
I Want (2014)	Out (2015)	You (2017)

Singles from Out
- 1. "Everytime" Released: 3 May 2015; 2. "Me Minus You" Released: 14 May 2015; 3. "Why Don't You Love Me?" Released: 14 September 2015

Out is the second studio album by Italian rock band the Kolors, released on 19 May 2015 by Baraonda Edizioni Musicali.

The album peaked at number one of the Italian Albums Chart and was certified double platinum by FIMI. The lead single from the album, "Everytime", peaked at number 6 in Italy.

== Background and composition ==
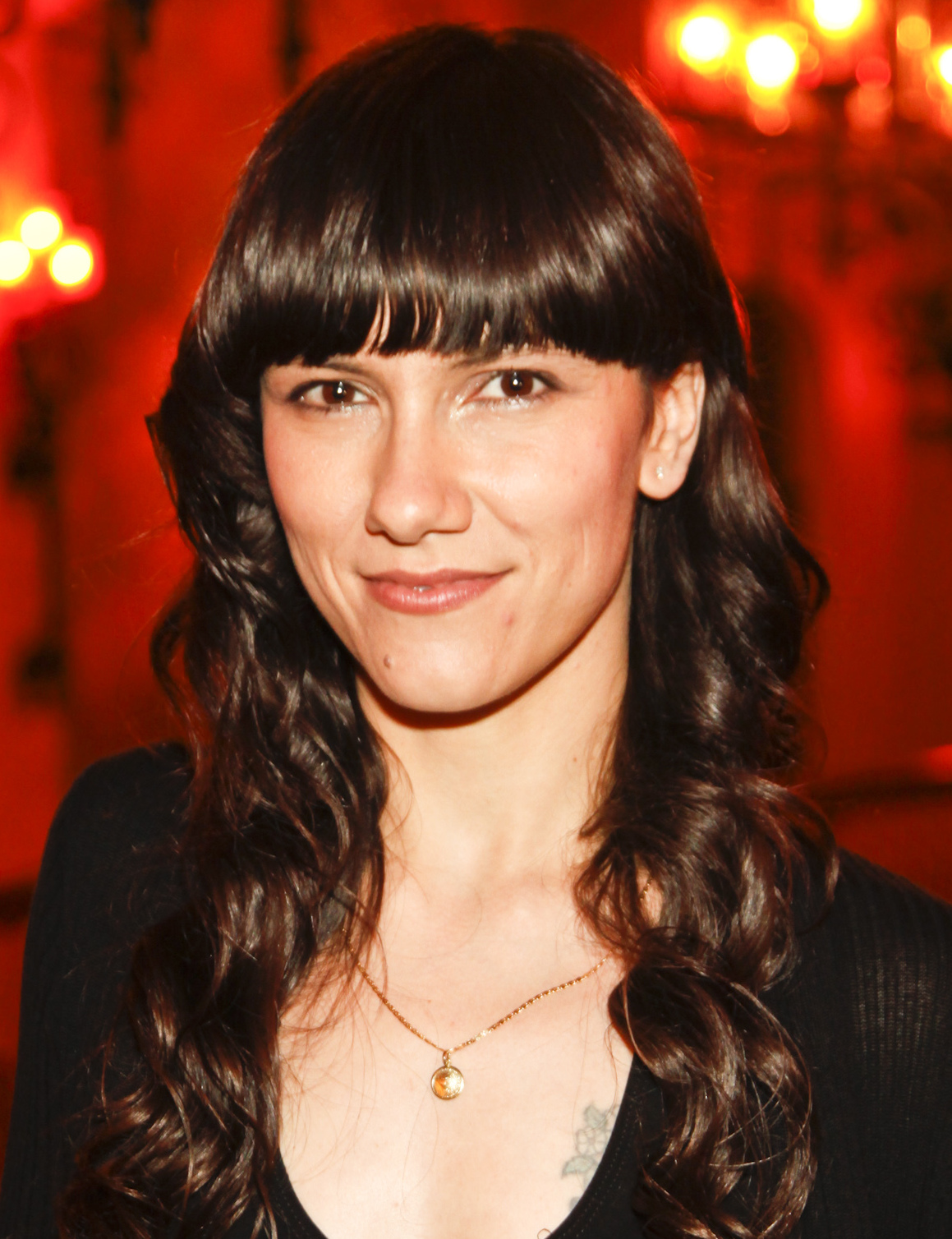
Elisa, who also sing in both Italian and English, helped the band to re-recorded the album.

"On Amici we recorded again the record and interpreted it in a different way. If it came this way I have to thank Elisa Toffoli, who was our tutor inside the program and everyone who surrounded me in this experience."

— Stash Fiordispino about the album conception.

During their participation at the Italian talent show Amici di Maria De Filippi, coached by Italian singer-songwriter Elisa, the band signed with Italian independent label Baraonda Edizioni Musicali.

The album was written and produced all in English language by the band with Pino Perris, MACE, Raffaella Misit and Elisa, who also collaborated on the track.

== Track listing ==
Out – Standard edition
No.	Title	Writer(s)	Length
1.	"Out"	Alex Fiordispino; Stash Fiordispino; Daniele Mona	1:18
2.	"Everytime"	A. Fioridispino; S. Fiordispino; D. Mona; Pino Perris	3:06
3.	"Why Don't You Love Me?"	A. Fiordispino; S. Fiordispino; Mona; Alex Trecarichi	3:06
4.	"My Queen"	A. Fiordispino; S. Fiordispino; Mona; Perris; Raffaella Misiti	3:00
5.	"Me Minus You"	A. Fiordispino; S. Fiordispino; Rocco Tanica	4:00
6.	"Why"	A. Fioridispino; S. Fiordispino; D. Mona; P. Perris	2:59
7.	"Realize" (featuring Elisa)	S. Fiordispino; ElisaToffoli; Simone Benussi	3:02
8.	"I'm Sorry"	A. Fioridispino; S. Fiordispino; D. Mona; P. Perris	4:04
9.	"Great Escape"	Callum Burrows; Kevin Griffin	2:58
10.	"Love"	A. Fioridispino; S. Fiordispino; D. Mona; P. Perris	3:22
11.	"Twisting"	A. Fiordispino; S. Fiordispino; Mona; Rocco Tanica; Alex Trecarichi	3:06
12.	"It's Up to You"	S. Fiordispino; Perris; Raffaella Misiti	3:29
Total length:			37:30

== Charts ==
=== Weekly charts ===
Weekly chart performance for Out
Chart (2015)	Peak position
Italian Albums (FIMI)	1

=== Year-end charts ===
Year-end chart performance for Out
Chart (2015)	Position
Italian Albums (FIMI)	3

== Certifications ==
Certifications for Out
Region	Certification	Certified units/sales
Italy (FIMI)	4× Platinum	200,000^{*}
^{*} Sales figures based on certification alone.
