= Litoranea (song) =

Single by Elisa featuring Matilda De Angelis

from the album Ritorno al futuro/Back to the Future
- Language: Italian
- Released: May 6, 2022
- Recorded: 2022
- Genre: Electropop; funk
- Length: 3:33
- Label: Universal; Island
- Songwriters: Edoardo D'Erme, Davide Petrella, Elisa Toffoli, Simone Benussi; Gaetano Scognamiglio
- Producers: Elisa Toffoli; MACE

Elisa singles chronology
"O forse sei tu" (2022)	"Litoranea" (2022)	"Palla al centro" (2022)

Music video
- "Litoranea" on YouTube

"Litoranea" is a song by Italian singer Elisa, released through Universal Music Italia and Island Records on May 6, 2022 as the third single from her eleventh studio album, Ritorno al futuro/Back to the Future. The song features guest vocals by Italian singer and actress Matilda De Angelis.

== Background and composition ==
The song, which is included as the fifth track of Ritorno al futuro/Back to the Future, was released as the third single with the unreleased vocal collaboration of De Angelis. The lyrics are written by Calcutta, Davide Petrella, Gaetano Scognamiglio with Elisa and Mace, who were also the producers of the song. The song features funk and dance music sound influences.

== Critics reception ==
The song received positive reviews by Italian music critics, praising the sound and the lyrics, and the vocal of the singers in both solo and collaborative versions. Italian magazine Panorama ranked the song as the third on its list of the "Best Italian Songs of 2022".

Giulia Ciavarelli of TV Sorrisi e Canzonii reported that the song "moves between electronic sounds and an enthralling funk procession that results in an extraordinary mix of sound worlds". The journalist described the lyrics as "the journey between melancholic and dreamy atmospheres make it a perfect soundtrack for summer".

All Music Italia, describing the song, noted that it is "a song that tastes of summer and freedom in a journey between melancholic and dreamy atmospheres", calling it "an exceptional duet; [...] in which the two voices chase each other and unite magically". Luca Dondoni of La Stampa, reviewing the album, dwelled on the track, writing that "Litoranea" is "a beautiful song that stands out more than others in this double work in Italian and English" being pleasantly impressed by Calcutta's "powerful presence" on the lyrics.

== Music video ==
The music video, directed by YouNuts!, was released at the same time as the single's release through Elisa's YouTube channel. The video was filmed in Côte d'Azur and Cannes.

== Charts ==
Chart performance for "Litoranea"
Chart (2022)	Peak position
Italy Airplay (EarOne)	2

== Certifications ==
Certifications for Litoranea
Region	Certification	Certified units/sales
Italy (FIMI)	Gold	50,000^{‡}
^{‡} Sales+streaming figures based on certification alone.
