= Ritorno al futuro/Back to the Future =

Ritorno al Futuro/Back to the Future

Studio album by Elisa
- Released: 18 February 2022
- Recorded: 2021, Fiumicello Villa Vicentina (Italia)
- Genre: Pop
- Length: 91:11
- Language: Italian; English
- Label: Universal; Island
- Producer: Elisa; Andrea Rigonat; Dardust; Don Joe; Mace; Marz; Michelangelo; Shablo; Sixpm; Stevie Aiello; Venerus; Zef

Elisa chronology
Diari aperti (2018)	Ritorno al Futuro/Back to the Future (2022)	Back to the Future Live (2022)

Singles from Ritorno al futuro/Back to the Future
- 1. "Seta" Released: 24 November 2021; 2. "O forse sei tu" Released: 3 February 2022; 3. "Litoranea" Released: 6 May 2022; 4. "Palla al centro" Released: 26 August 2022; 5. "Come te nessuno mai" Released: 16 December 2022

Ritorno al Futuro/Back to the Future is the eleventh studio album by Italian singer-songwriter Elisa, released on 18 February 2022 by Universal Music Italia.

The album, a double record with songs in Italian in the first part and in English in the second one, featured the single "O forse sei tu", which competed during the Sanremo Music Festival 2022, classified in second place in the final ranking and recognized with the "Giancarlo Bigazzi" award for "Best Musical Composition".

The album became Elisa's fifth number one album on the Italian Albums Chart, and it received positive reviews by Italian critics, placing among the best Italian albums of 2022.

== Conception and composition ==
"Sometimes in music, in fashion, in art, in film, in so many forms of expression you are dealing with time and space, [...]. With an emotional wave that belongs to everyone, and somehow telling that wave is an important part of what we deal with. And then there are the dreams and visions. I have been dreaming about all these songs these past two years, and I have definitely clung to them over and over again. I had visions of us all singing them together in concerts that we couldn't do. I wanted to write songs that could shake us up and wake us up and help us pull out everything we put in. [...] I had to do more, much more. I had to justify absence, lack, I had to build new reasons, new tracks to run on. I was observing myself and the world and the pandemic, I was still but this stillness led me to meditate and then choose more deeply and definitively everything I put together in this double album. I wanted redemption. I always want it. It doesn't matter if I can get it, I care about how I feel as I seek it."

— Elisa Toffoli about the album conception

Ritorno al futuro/Back to the Future is a double album featuring songs in Italian in the first disc and other in English in the second one. The recording project features a total of twenty-five songs written and composed by Elisa with numerous songwriters and composers, including Davide Petrella, Dardust, Calcutta, Takagi & Ketra, Franco126 and Stevie Aiello. For the production of the songs there is the participation of Sixpm, Dardust, Zef, Mace, Shablo, Don Joe and Venerus. There are also three collaborations with Rkomi, Jovanotti and an all-female song with Elodie, Giorgia and Roshelle. The process of writing and composing the songs saw the artist interface with new ways, writing lyrics directly on a beat. Elisa talked about her choice of album title in an interview with Sky TG24:

"The decision to name the record in this way came from a live show inspiration, the idea came at the end of the last tour-I was already imagining this as a good excuse to field a certain new method of sustainability, to push as much as possible in that direction. I am with those who believe, I am a dreamer, an idealist, but also an artisan who gets her hands dirty, I come from a blue-collar family. I call them the last ones because in so many cases those who give up a lot in a house are the last ones, the most disillusioned and crafty ones are the players in capitalism. [...] The perception is changing in the younger generations because they understand the vulnerability of the system and the world itself, it makes them have more courage but this is not understood by the older generations who do not understand that the young people are already evolved and somewhere else."

== Promotion ==
=== Singles ===
The lead single "Seta" was published on 24 November 2021. On 15 Dicember 2021 the artistic director and presenter of the 72nd Sanremo Music Festival Amadeus announced that Elisa would be taking part in the song contest for the first time since her victory in 2001 with the song "Luce (Tramonti a nord est)". The song presented in the competition, "O forse sei tu", was released as the second single from the album on 3 February 2022, peaking at number two on the Italian singles chart.

The third single "Litoranea", featuring italian singer and acrtess Matilda De Angelis, was published on 6 May 2022, followed by the collaboration with Jovanotti "Palla al Centro", publieshed on 26 August 2022. The fifth and final single, "Come te nessuno mai", was published on 16 December 2022.

=== Back to the Future Live Tour, European tour e An Intimate Night ===
In February 2022, it was announced that Elisa would serve as artistic director of the Heroes Festival in Verona. The festival was held as a "green-village" to raise awareness of environmental issues and in favor of sustainable development. The festival continued on May 28, 30 and 31, 2022, when Elisa performed three concert-events at the Arena di Verona.

From June 28 to September 24, 2022, Elisa performed thirty concerts on the Back to the Future Live Tour, a tour promoting the album with a low environmental impact, as told by the artist:

I want to give the audience back the magic of concerts: it could be done with daylight but something would be missing, that's not how you make people love sustainability. It is not with that one action that I will solve anything: smaller, daily, continuous gestures are important. [...] The theme of sustainability will be there but in an artistic way, because I don't want it to take away from the magic or lightness of the moment. I want there to be a good feeling; we are celebrating beauty. [...] As a person I feel an obligation to do this, for the world and nature. I will not stop here and I think this is just the beginning.

— Elisa Toffoli

From October 2 to November 5, 2022, the singer promoted an eight-date European tour, including in Brussels, Munich, Barcelona, and London. Between December and January 2023, the singer embarked on An Intimate Night, a tour that took place exclusively in theaters and featured Dardust as artistic collaborator and musician.

== Critical reception ==
Claudio Cabona of Rockol found that "Elisa has always been an experimenter, even in the past she opened her music to other influences and contaminations, but always linked to a world that in some way showed traits similar to her own," but that the project probably stemmed from "a concrete response to the isolation generated by the pandemic and which in fact sanction an attack on all forms of narcissism. It is no coincidence that the common thread of the record is the idea of reacting to these uncertain and ruthless times." Cabona found that Ritorno al futuro/Back to the Future represents "a sonic mosaic; [...] in which there is the Elisa of always, but also the one that no one would have ever expected." Giulia Ciavarelli for TV Sorrisi e Canzoni reported that in Ritorno al futuro/Back to the Future "Elisa experiments, opens herself up to new contaminations, and hosts in the tracklist many artists from the Italian scene in the composition of music, production, and lyrics".

Giorgia Dughetti of All Music Italia wrote that the album "fits perfectly into its time, both in terms of themes and sonority and research" in which "Ritorno al futuro/Back to the Future means trying not to make the same mistakes again, changing attitude, being more aware of our weight on the world and what we can do." Placing the album in ninth place of the 15 best albums of 2022, Umberto Salvato for the same publication, described the record as "the perfect crasis between the artist's past, present and future," calling the production of the songs carried out with "excellent mastery, [...] contemporary without ever betraying itself."

Reviewing the album for Rolling Stone Italia's list of the "25 Best Italian Albums of 2022", in which the album is ranked at No. 2, critic Claudio Todesco described the singer as "an exception" in the Italian recording panorama, writing that "for her, music is clearly an inclusive, not an exclusive experience." The critic noted that on the Italian-language tracks, calling them "the most immediate, [...] melodic and very Italian in which she manages to be poignant and credible," and those in English considered "the most solid; [...] pop pieces of international caliber." Todesco concludes the review by writing that although the album remains "one step behind contemporary trends, [...] it makes two ahead in the overabundance of musical stimuli." Ernesto Assante of La Repubblica listed the album as one of the best of 2022, describing it as an album that "demands time and attention from the audience," as the artist has included in it "the perfect representation of everything she asks of music today and to music she knows how to give, with passion, inclusiveness and sharing."

== Track listing ==
Ritorno al futuro – Standard track listing (Disc 1)
No.	Title	Lyrics	Music	Producer(s)	Length
1.	"A tempo perso"	Elisa Toffoli	Toffoli; Andrea Ferrara	Sixpm	3:47
2.	"Seta"	Davide Petrella	Toffoli; Dario Faini	Dardust	3:33
3.	"Come sei veramente"	Toffoli; Petrella	Toffoli; Andrea Rigonat; William Medini	Rigonat; Michelangelo	3:56
4.	"O forse sei tu"	Toffoli; Petrella	Toffoli	Rigonat	3:53
5.	"Litoranea"	Edoardo D'Erme; Petrella	D'Erme; Gaetano Scognamiglio; Petrella	Toffoli; MACE	3:33
6.	"Quello che manca" (featuring Rkomi)	Toffoli; Mirko Manuele Martorana	Toffoli; Ferrara	Sixpm	3:30
7.	"Luglio" (featuring Elodie, Giorgia and Roshelle)	Toffoli; Petrella	Toffoli	Toffoli; MACE	3:33
8.	"Come te nessuno mai"	Toffoli; Petrella	Toffoli; Petrella	Rigonat	4:46
9.	"Non me ne pento"	Toffoli	Toffoli; Luigi Florio	Don Joe	3:22
10.	"Palla al centro" (featuring Jovanotti)	Toffoli	Toffoli; Faini; Vanni Casagrande	Dardust	3:47
11.	"Chi lo sa"	Toffoli; Federico Bertollini	Toffoli; Bertollini; Alessandro Merli; Fabio Clemente	Rigonat	3:29
12.	"Quando arriva la notte"	Toffoli	Toffoli; Andrea Venerus; Simone Benussi	MACE; Venerus	4:18

Back to the Future – Standard track listing (Disc 2)
No.	Title	Lyrics	Music	Producer(s)	Length
1.	"Show's Rollin'"	Toffoli	Toffoli	Toffoli; Marz; Zef	3:48
2.	"Let Me"	Toffoli; Jessica Allison Childress	Toffoli	Toffoli	3:51
3.	"Drink to Me"	Toffoli	Toffoli	Toffoli; Marz; Zef	2:42
4.	"I Feel It in the Earth"	Toffoli; Childress	Toffoli	Toffoli	3:42
5.	"Ordinary Day"	Toffoli; Childress	Toffoli	Rigonat	3:21
6.	"Tears May Roll Down Now"	Toffoli; Childress	Toffoli	Toffoli; Rigonat	3:50
7.	"Fuckin' Believers"	Toffoli	Toffoli	Toffoli; Marz; Zef	3:24
8.	"Hope"	Toffoli; Stephen Aiello	Toffoli; Aiello	Toffoli; Aiello	2:43
9.	"Domino"	Toffoli; Childress	Toffoli	Toffoli; Sixpm	3:47
10.	"Like I Want You"	Toffoli	Toffoli; Nicolò Scalabrin; Pablo Miguel Lombroni Capalbo	Toffoli; Shablo	3:34
11.	"My Mission"	Toffoli	Andrea Fumagalli	Toffoli	2:41
12.	"Fire"	Toffoli	Toffoli	Toffoli; Marz; Zef	4:22
13.	"Let It Go to Waste on Me"	Toffoli; Childress	Toffoli	Toffoli	3:59

Ritorno al futuro – Streaming edition exclusive track (Disc 1)
No.	Title	Lyrics	Music	Producer(s)	Length
5.	"Litoranea" (featuring Matilda De Angelis)	D'Erme; Petrella	D'Erme; Scognamiglio; Petrella	Toffoli; MACE	3:33

Back to the Future – Streaming edition bonus tracks (Disc 2)
No.	Title	Lyrics	Music	Producer(s)	Length
4.	"On Me"	Toffoli; Childress	Toffoli	Toffoli; Marz; Zef	3:32
13.	"Shout" (originally performed vy Tears for Fears)	Roland Orzabal; Ian Stanley	Orzabal; Stanley	Toffoli	5:00

== Commercial performance ==
On February 24, 2022, the album debuted at No. 8 on the Top Albums Debut Global chart of the Spotify platform. It subsequently debuted at No. 1 on the FIMI Albums Chart, becoming the Elisa's fifth album to achieve this, following Soundtrack '96–'06 (2006), Heart (2009), L'anima vola (2013) and On (2016). It also peaked on the FIMI Vinyls chart. Ritorno al Futuro/Back to the Future turned out to be the best-selling album by a female artist in Italy in 2022, ranking 33rd on the annual chart.

== Charts ==
=== Weekly charts ===
Weekly chart performance for Ritorno al futuro/Back to the Future
Chart (2022)	Peak position
Italian Albums (FIMI)	1
Swiss Albums (Schweizer Hitparade)	31

=== Year-end charts ===
Year-end chart performance for Ritorno al futuro/Back to the Future
Chart (2022)	Position
Italian Albums (FIMI)	33

== Certifications ==
Certifications for Ritorno al Futuro/Back to the Future
Region	Certification	Certified units/sales
Italy (FIMI)	Platinum	50,000^{‡}
^{‡} Sales+streaming figures based on certification alone.
