= Karma (The Kolors song) =

2024 song by The Kolors

Single by the Kolors
- Language: Italian
- Released: 3 May 2024
- Genre: Synthpop
- Length: 3:21
- Label: Warner
- Composers: Antonio "Stash" Fiordispino; Alessandro Fiordispino; Dario Iaculli; Lorenzo Santarelli; Marco Salvaderi; Kende
- Lyricists: Antonio "Stash" Fiordispino; Davide Petrella
- Producers: The Kolors; Room9

The Kolors singles chronology
"Un ragazzo una ragazza" (2024)	"Karma" (2024)	"Tu con chi fai l'amore" (2025)

Music video
- "Karma" on YouTube

"Karma" is a 2024 song by Italian pop rock band the Kolors. It was written by the band's members with Davide Petrella, Lorenzo Santarelli, Marco Salvaderi and Kende, and was released by Warner Music on 3 May 2024.

== Music video ==
A music video of "Karma" was released on 3 June 2024 via The Kolors's YouTube channel. It was directed by YouNuts! and shot in Piazza San Silvestro in Rome. The video also features Italian showman Fiorello.

== Charts ==
=== Weekly charts ===
Weekly chart performance for "Karma"
Chart (2024)	Peak position
Italy (FIMI)	17
Italy Airplay (EarOne)	1
Poland (Polish Airplay Top 100)	29

=== Year-end charts ===
2024 year-end chart performance for "Karma"
Chart (2024)	Position
Italy (FIMI)	82

== Certifications ==
Certifications for "Karma"
Region	Certification	Certified units/sales
Italy (FIMI)	Platinum	100,000^{‡}
^{‡} Sales+streaming figures based on certification alone.
