= Gloria! (film) =

2024 historical film by Margherita Vicario

- Directed by: Margherita Vicario
- Written by: Margherita Vicario; Anita Rivarolli
- Produced by: Valeria Jamonte; Manuela Melissano; Carlo Cresto-Dina; Katrin Renz
- Starring: Galatea Bellugi
- Cinematography: Gianluca Palma
- Edited by: Christian Marsiglia
- Music by: Margherita Vicario; Davide Pavanello
- Production companies: Tempesta; tellfilm; Rai Cinema
- Distributed by: 01 Distribution (Italy); Filmcoopi (Switzerland)
- Release dates: 21 February 2024 (Berlinale); 11 April 2024 (Italy)
- Running time: 105 minutes
- Countries: Italy; Switzerland
- Language: Italian
- Box office: $1.1 million

Gloria! is a 2024 historical musical film Italian/Swiss international co-production co-written and directed by Margherita Vicario who also co-wrote the film's score in her directorial debut, and starring Galatea Bellugi, Carlotta Gamba, Veronica Lucchesi, Maria Vittoria Dallasta and Sara Mafodda. The film centres on a group of young musicians inventing pop music in 18th century Italy. It is an international co-production between Italy and Switzerland.

Gloria! was selected to compete for the Golden Bear at the 74th Berlin International Film Festival, where it premiered on 21 February 2024 at Berlinale Palast. The film was released in Italy on 11 April 2024.

== Synopsis ==
It is late 18th century in Venice. In a musical school for orphan girls (modelled on Vivaldi's Ospedale della Pietà) a servant, Teresa, loves hearing the music all around her. She finds a new piano-forte in a storeroom, and with four other girls of the school they begin to make music together, although one of the girls, Lucia, dislikes Teresa. To compromise, they take turns on the piano with an hourglass. Meanwhile, Perlina, the school's director, is trying to compose a work to welcome the new Pope.

The girls are aware that Perlina has not made headway with the composition and Lucia offers her work, only for Perlina to rudely decline her offer. She then receives a letter from her would-be betrothed's parents, saying that they are not in fact going ahead with the marriage. Upset by all of this, she attempts to commit suicide.

Perlina has sold the piano to pay for his friend's debts. Teresa discovers that the piano was given to the orphans, not to Perlina, and demands it back. She threatens to reveal that she was raped by the Governor and had her son taken away from her, if the piano is not given back and Lucia's composition not used for the Pope's performance.

At the performance, the girls lock Perlina behind the wall in order to perform their own piece of music. Chaos ensues, with many audience members enjoying it, some hating it, and the Pope angry. The Governor has a heart attack and dies.

The epilogue reveals Teresa living with her son and his step-mother, receiving a letter from the girls who have formed a successful travelling musical group.

== Cast ==
- Galatea Bellugi as Teresa
- Carlotta Gamba as Lucia
- Maria Vittoria Dallasta as Marietta
- Sara Mafodda as Prudenza
- Veronica Lucchesi as Bettina
- Paolo Rossi as Perlina
- Natalino Balasso as Governor
- Anita Kravos as Donna Lidia
- Jasmin Mattei as Fidelia
- Gioele Pagura as Giacomo
- Vincenzo Crea as Cristiano
- Elio as Romeo

== Release ==
Gloria! had its world premiere on 21 February 2024 at 74th Berlin International Film Festival, where it was screened in the Main Competition category.

The film was released in Italy by 01 Distribution on 11 April 2024.

The film was also screened in 'Horizons' at the 58th Karlovy Vary International Film Festival on 28 June 2024. It was screened in 'Showcase' at the 2024 Vancouver International Film Festival on 27 September 2024.

== Reception ==
=== Box office ===
Gloria! grossed $156,786 during its opening weekend in Italy from 265 cinemas.

=== Critical response ===
On the review aggregator website Rotten Tomatoes, 83% of 6 critics' reviews are positive, with an average rating of 5.0/10.

Nicholas Bell in Ion Cinema rated the film with two and half stars and wrote, "With its joyful noise and winning streak of creative, rebellious women, Gloria! may often be pleasurable but could have used some tightening of the screws and heightening of dramatic stakes."

Reviewing the film at Berlinale for ScreenDaily, Lee Marshall wrote: "One would need a tough skin not to be won over by the mischievous musical anachronism at the heart of Gloria! and the chemistry of the young female cast that delivers it."

Guy Lodge wrote in Variety, "Ebullient musical sequences are the chief virtue of this peppy but sketchily scripted directorial debut from actor-musician Margherita Vicario. ... The soaring motivational message here wouldn’t be clipped by a little interior conflict on either side, but Gloria! is all about chasing the highest of high notes."

Reviewing the film at Berlinale for Cineuropa, Savina Petkova wrote, "Not only that: Gloria! takes the utmost pleasure in empowering its female characters as women fed up with the uselessness of certain men in power, enough to then take matters into their own hands; a delightful aspiration to have and a form of pure joy to share with the biggest audiences on the biggest screen."

=== Accolades ===
List of awards and nominations for Gloria!
Award or film festival	Date	Category	Recipient	Result	Ref.
Berlin International Film Festival	25 February 2024	Golden Bear	Gloria!	Nominated	
Berlin International Film Festival	25 February 2024	GWFF Best First Feature Award	Margherita Vicario	Nominated	
Seattle International Film Festival	19 May 2024	SIFF 2024 Official Competition :Grand Jury Prize	Margherita Vicario	Won	
Nastro d'Argento	27 June 2024	Best new director	Margherita Vicario	Nominated	
Nastro d'Argento	27 June 2024	Best costumes	Mary Montalto	Nominated	
Nastro d'Argento	27 June 2024	Best score	Margherita Vicario, Davide Pavanello	Won	
Globo d'oro	3 July 2024	Best debut film	Gloria!	Won	
