= Un ragazzo una ragazza =

2024 single by the Kolors

Single by The Kolors
- Language: Italian
- Released: 7 February 2024
- Genre: Disco
- Length: 3:37
- Label: Warner
- Songwriters: Alex Fiordispino; Stash Fiordispino; Davide Petrella; Francesco Catitti
- Producers: Stash Fiordispino; Francesco Catitti; Room 9

The Kolors singles chronology
"Italodisco" (2023)	"Un ragazzo una ragazza" (2024)	"Karma" (2024)

Music video
- "Un ragazzo una ragazza" on YouTube

"Un ragazzo una ragazza" (transl. "A boy a girl") is a song by Italian rock band The Kolors, released on 7 February 2024 through Warner.

The song competed in the 74th Sanremo Music Festival, Italy's musical festival which doubles also as a selection of the act for Eurovision Song Contest, where it placed 16th in the grand final.

== Composition ==
The song was written by the band members Stash and Alex Fiordispino with Davide Petrella and Francesco Catitti. In an interview with L'Officiel Italia, the frontman Stash explained the conception and lyrics of the song:

"It is not about a relationship between two people as the title would hint, but it is about the concept - more or less universal - of breaking the ice. It was born from a scene that happened in Milan's Central Station, we noticed a guy who wanted to approach a girl. In the context in which we live today, everything is based online with emoji, likes, directs and views, seeing the offline approach is even more difficult, and starting from this concept we began our songwriting process. [...] It expresses a search for something not taken for granted to destroy precisely a barrier that is created in the mind when you have to take a first step."

Musically it is inspired by Prince's song "Kiss", with a "baseline close to the world of funk, including as a genre also italo disco".

== Critical reception ==
The song received general positive reviews by Italian music critics.

Andrea Conti of Il Fatto Quotidiano described the song as "one of the most powerful songs by The Kolors", thanks to "a vortex of up-tempo music, relentless drums and bass". Andrea Laffranchi of Corriere della Sera wrote that the song is musically composed by "straight case and funk scent". Silvia Danielli of Billboard Italia wrote that the band remain in the 80s dance sounds of "Italodisco" with a "simple" lyric language. Il Messaggero pointed out that the song is a "fatal catchphrase" with "70s violins, woodwinds and funk basses".

== Music video ==
The music video for the song, directed by Younuts!, was released on 7 February 2024, through the singer's YouTube channel. The video also features Polish singer and model Blanka.

== Charts ==
=== Weekly charts ===
Weekly chart performance for "Un ragazzo una ragazza"
Chart (2024)	Peak position
Belarus Airplay (TopHit)	58
CIS Airplay (TopHit)	99
Estonia Airplay (TopHit)	69
Italy (FIMI)	7
Italy Airplay (EarOne)	1
Lithuania Airplay (TopHit)	23
Poland (Polish Airplay Top 100)	1
Slovakia Airplay (ČNS IFPI)	22
Switzerland (Schweizer Hitparade)	37

=== Monthly charts ===
Monthly chart performance for "Un ragazzo una ragazza"
Chart (2024)	Peak position
Belarus Airplay (TopHit)	79
Lithuania Airplay (TopHit)	28
Slovakia (Rádio – Top 100)	25

=== Year-end charts ===
2024 year-end chart performance for "Un ragazzo una ragazza"
Chart (2024)	Position
Italy (FIMI)	18
Poland (Polish Airplay Top 100)	13

2025 year-end chart performance for "Un ragazzo una ragazza"
Chart (2025)	Position
Poland (Polish Airplay Top 100)	98

== Certifications ==
Certifications for "Un ragazzo una ragazza"
Region	Certification	Certified units/sales
Italy (FIMI)	2× Platinum	200,000^{‡}
Poland (ZPAV)	Gold	25,000^{‡}
^{‡} Sales+streaming figures based on certification alone.
