= Margherita Vicario =

Italian actress and singer-songwriter

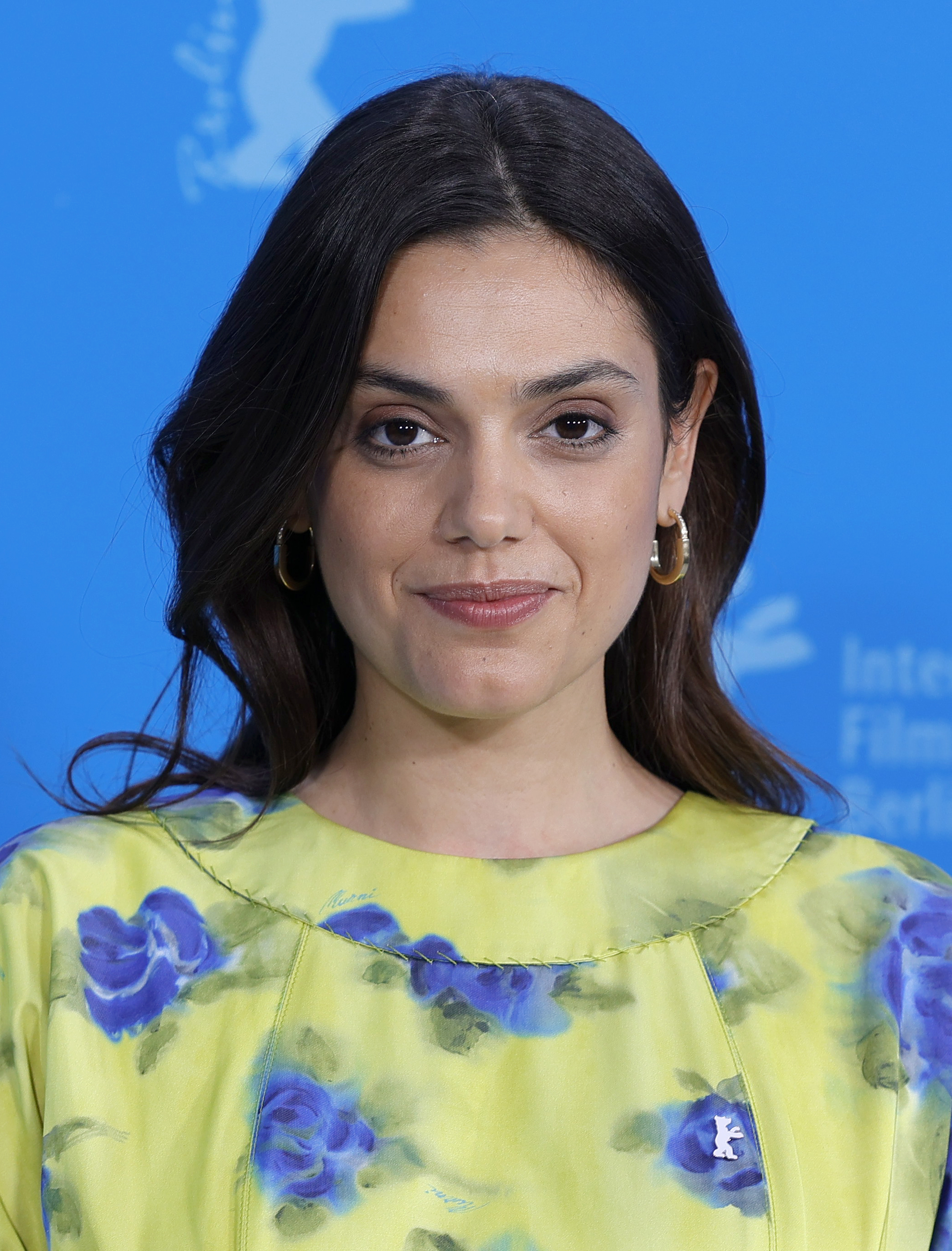
- Margherita Vicario (2024)

Background information
- Born: 13 February 1988 (age 38); Rome, Italy
- Genres: Pop; indie pop; hip hop
- Occupations: Singer; songwriter; actress
- Years active: 2009–present
- Labels: Fiorirari (2013–16); INRI (2016–20); Island Records (2020–present)

Margherita Vicario (born 13 February 1988) is an Italian singer, songwriter and actress.

== Biography ==
She is the daughter of Italian director Francesco Vicario and the granddaughter of Marco Vicario and Rossana Podestà. She grew up in Grazzano Visconti, a small village in the province of Piacenza, before moving to Rome aged 13 with her family. She graduated from the Link Campus University in Performing Arts in Rome. She debuted with a minor role in Woody Allen's To Rome with Love (2012) and appeared in several Italian TV series such as I Cesaroni, R.I.S. Roma – Delitti imperfetti, Caccia al Re – La narcotici and Carlo & Malik.

As a singer-songwriter, she released her debut single "Nota bene" in 2013. Her first studio album Minimal Musical was released independently in 2014. She released her second studio album Bingo with the label Island Records in 2021. Bingo peaked at 21 in the Italian album charts. She released collaborations with numerous artists, including Elodie, Francesca Michielin, Gaia, Rancore, Raphael Gualazzi, and Vinicio Capossela.

In February 2022, she participated in Sanremo Music Festival accompanying La Rappresentante di Lista, Cosmo, and Ginevra during the covers night, singing the song "Be My Baby" by The Ronettes.

In 2024, Vicario made her directorial debut with the film Gloria!, which premiered at the 74th Berlin International Film Festival. The film was released in Italy on 11 April 2024. The original soundtrack for the film, also written by Vicario, won the Soundtrack Stars Award at the 81st Venice Film Festival.

At the 2026 Winter Olympics closing ceremony, on 22 February in Verona, Vicario sang with Davide Shorty to the music of Calibro 35.

== Discography ==
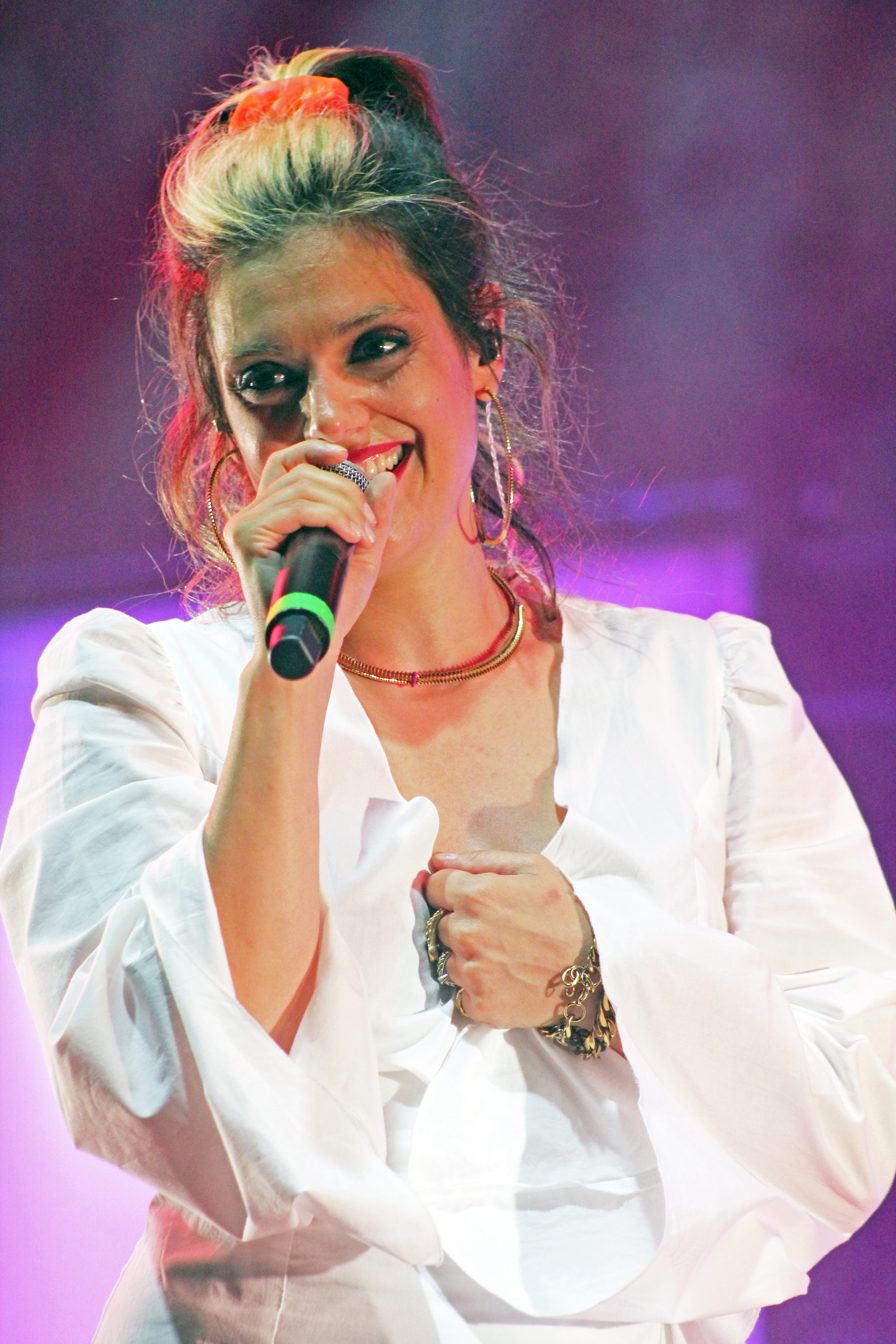
Vicario performing in 2022

=== Studio albums ===
List of studio albums, with chart positions and certifications
| Title | Album details | Peak chart positions | Certifications |
| Title | Album details | ITA | Certifications |
|---|---|---|---|
| Minimal Musical | Released: 6 December 2014; Label: Fiorirari; Format: CD, digital download | — | |
| Bingo | Released: 14 May 2021; Label: Universal, Island; Format: CD, LP, digital download, streaming | 21 | |

=== Soundtracks ===
List of soundtrack albums
| Title | Album details |
|---|---|
| Gloria! | Released: 12 April 2024; Label: Universal; Format: LP, digital download |

=== Extended plays ===
List of extended plays
| Title | Album details |
|---|---|
| Esercizi preparatori | Released: 20 May 2014; Label: Fiorirari; Format: CD, digital download |
| Showtime | Released: 19 January 2024; Label: Universal, Island; Format: Digital download |

=== Singles ===
==== As lead artist ====
List of singles as main artist, with date and album name
| Single | Year | Album |
|---|---|---|
| "Nota bene" | 2013 | Esercizi preparatori |
| "Per un bacio" | 2014 | Minimal Musical |
| "La matrona" | 2017 | Non-album singles |
| "Castagne" | 2018 | Non-album singles |
| "Abaué (morte di un trap boy)" | 2019 | Bingo |
| "Mandela" | 2019 | Bingo |
| "Romeo" (featuring Speranza) | 2019 | Bingo |
| "Giubottino" | 2020 | Bingo |
| "Pincio" | 2020 | Bingo |
| "Is This Love" | 2020 | Non-album single |
| "Piña colada" (featuring Izi) | 2020 | Bingo |
| "Orango tango" | 2021 | Bingo |
| "Come va" | 2021 | Bingo |
| "La meglio gioventù" | 2021 | Non-album singles |
| "Astronauti" | 2022 | Non-album singles |
| "Onde" | 2022 | Non-album singles |
| "Ave Maria" | 2023 | Showtime |
| "Canzoncina" | 2023 | Showtime |
| "Magia" | 2023 | Showtime |
| "Aria!" | 2024 | Gloria! |

==== As featured artist ====
List of singles as supporting artist, with date and album name
| Single | Year | Album |
|---|---|---|
| "Equatore" (Rancore featuring Margherita Vicario) | 2021 | Xenoverso |
| "Karma Sutra" (Selton featuring Margherita Vicario) | 2021 | Benvenuti |
| "Natale per te" (DeeJay All Stars featuring Margherita Vicario & Elodie) | 2021 | Non-album single |

=== Guest appearances ===
| Title | Year | Other artist(s) | Album |
|---|---|---|---|
| "Call Me Now" | 2009 | None | Sole & I Demoni - Back to Piper |
| "Il cuore va nell'organico" | 2016 | Lucio Corsi | Kahbum: Stagione 1 |
| "Ciampino" | 2019 | Iva Collister | / |
| "Noi non ci saremo" | 2019 | None | Note di viaggio - Capitolo 1: venite avanti... |
| "Sposa" | 2020 | Elodie | This Is Elodie |
| "Baby Mama" | 2021 | Vipra, Mr. Monkey | Simpatico, solare, in cerca di amicizie |
| "Ginga" | 2021 | Gaia, Francesca Michielin | Alma |
| "Be My Baby" | 2022 | La Rappresentante di Lista | My Mamma |
| "Senza paura" | 2022 | Raphael Gualazzi | Il bar del sole |

== Filmography ==
=== Films ===
| Year | Title | Role | Notes |
|---|---|---|---|
| 2011 | Tutta la verità sul caso del signor Valdemar | Nurse | Short |
| 2011 | Se riesco parto | Her | Short |
| 2012 | To Rome with Love | Claudia | |
| 2013 | La terra e il vento | Julie | |
| 2013 | Pazze di me | Roberta | |
| 2014 | Arance & martello | Emma | |
| 2016 | The Pills – Sempre meglio che lavorare | Giulia | |
| 2016 | L'Universale | Camilla | |
| 2016 | Cristian e Palletta contro tutti | Teresa | |
| 2022 | The Bad Guys | Ms. Tarantula | Voice (Italian dub) |
| 2022 | Perfetta illusione | Paola | |
| 2024 | Gloria! | None | Director, co-writer, and composer |

=== Television ===
| Year | Title | Role | Notes |
|---|---|---|---|
| 2008 | I Cesaroni | Student | Episode: "I segreti sono come i cereali nel latte" |
| 2010 | La ladra | Patty | Main role; 12 episodes |
| 2010 | R.I.S. Roma - Delitti imperfetti | Nina | Episode: "Lo spettacolo della crudeltà" |
| 2012 | 6 passi nel giallo | Marina Zammit | Episode: "Presagi" |
| 2012 | Un passo dal cielo | Nadia | Episode: "La nuova via" |
| 2013 | Borgia | Cariddi Grimani | Episode: "The Assumption" |
| 2015 | Il candidato - Zucca presidente | Magò | Episode: "L'inno" |
| 2015 | Caccia al Re - La narcotici | Cristina | Main role (season 2); 6 episodes |
| 2017 | Amore pensaci tu | Chiara Cordaro | Main role; 20 episodes |
| 2018–2022 | Carlo & Malik | Cinzia Repola | Main role |
| 2019 | Non ho niente da perdere | Federica | Television film |

== Awards and nominations ==
| Year | Award | Category | Nominated work | Result | Ref. |
|---|---|---|---|---|---|
| 2024 | Berlin International Film Festival | Golden Bear | Gloria! | Nominated | |
| 2024 | Nastro d'Argento | Best Score | Gloria! | Won | |
| 2024 | Nastro d'Argento | Best New Director | Gloria! | Nominated | |
