= Everytime (The Kolors song) =

2015 song by The Kolors

Single by The Kolors

from the album Out
- Language: English
- Released: 3 May 2015
- Length: 3:04
- Label: Baraonda
- Songwriter: Antonio "Stash" Fiordispino

The Kolors singles chronology
"Everytime" (2015)	"Me Minus You" (2015)

Music video
- "Everytime" on YouTube

"Everytime" is a song by Italian pop rock band The Kolors. It was released by Baraonda Edizioni Musicali on 3 May 2015 as the first single of the band's second album Out.

The song was first performed during the band's participation at the talent show Amici di Maria De Filippi. It peaked at number 6 on the Italian singles chart and was certified platinum in Italy.

== Music video ==
A music video of "Everytime" was released on 29 May 2015 via The Kolors's YouTube channel. It was directed by Giuliano Peparini, artistic director of Amici di Maria De Filippi, and shot in the show's studios in Rome.

== Use in other media ==
The song became the jingle of Vodafone Italy television's advertisement in 2015.

== Charts ==
Weekly chart performance for "Everytime"
Chart (2015)	Peak position
Italy (FIMI)	6

== Certifications ==
Region	Certification	Certified units/sales
Italy (FIMI)	Platinum	50,000^{‡}
^{‡} Sales+streaming figures based on certification alone.
