= Frida (mai, mai, mai) =

2018 song by The Kolors

Single by The Kolors
- Language: Italian
- Released: 7 February 2018
- Genre: Pop
- Length: 3:31
- Label: Baraonda
- Songwriters: Davide Petrella, Dario Faini, Alessandro Raina, Antonio "Stash" Fiordispino

The Kolors singles chronology
"Don't Understand" (2017)	"Frida (mai, mai, mai)" (2018)	"Come le onde" (2018)

Music video
- "Frida (mai, mai, mai)" on YouTube

"Frida (mai, mai, mai)" is a song written by Davide Petrella, Dario Faini, Alessandro Raina and Antonio "Stash" Fiordispino and performed by The Kolors. It was the band's entry for the 2018 edition of the Sanremo Music Festival, where it placed ninth.

Released on 7 February 2018, it is the first song recorded in Italian language by the band.

== Charts ==
Chart	Peak position
Italy (FIMI)	10
Italy Airplay (EarOne)	24
