= The Kolors =

Italian pop rock band

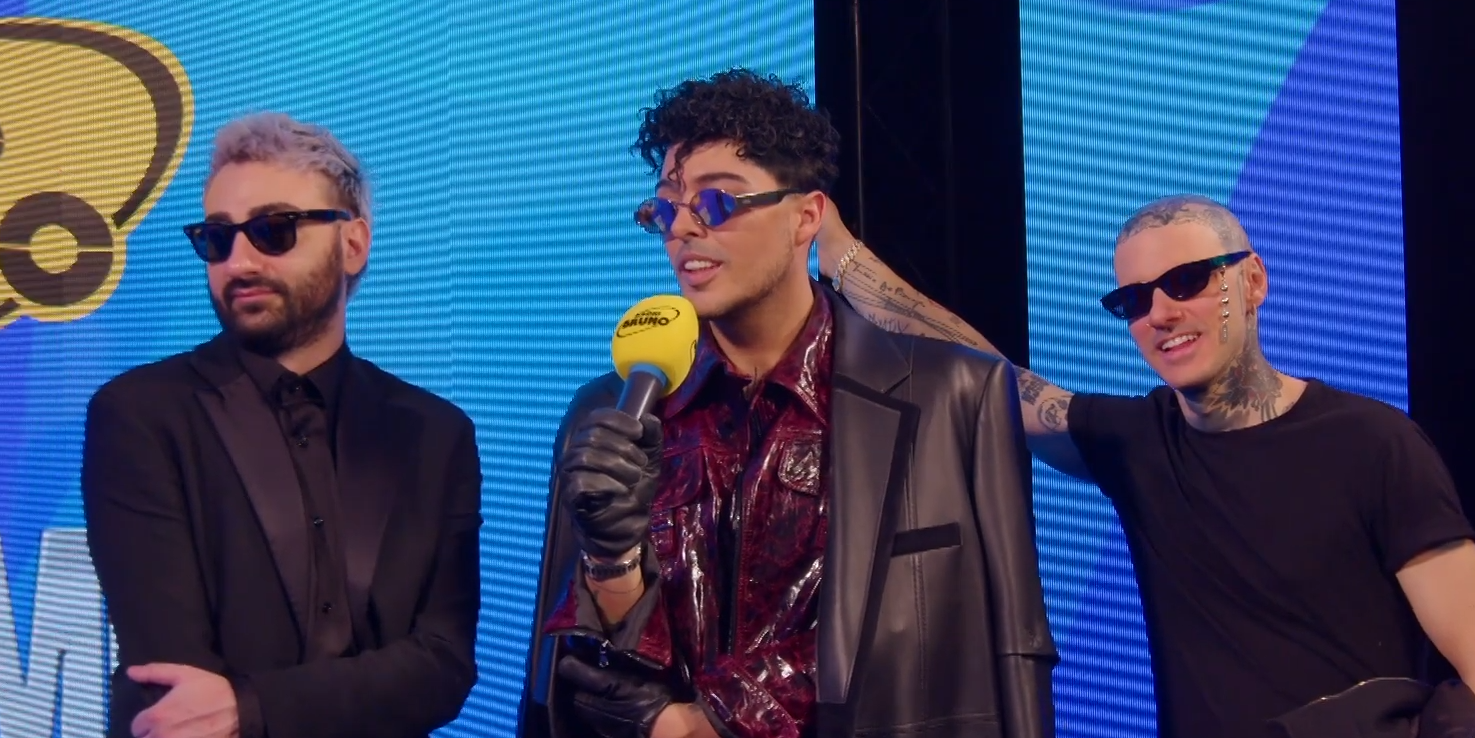
- The Kolors during the Sanremo Music Festival 2025

Background information
- Origin: Naples, Italy
- Genres: Pop rock; funk rock
- Years active: 2009–present
- Labels: Baraonda Edizioni Musicali; Island; Warner
- Members: Antonio Stash Fiordispino; Alex Fiordispino; Dario Iaculli
- Past members: Alessandro Tammaro; Daniele Mona

The Kolors is an Italian pop rock band founded in 2009 by lead vocalist Antonio Stash Fiordispino, drummer Alex Fiordispino, and Daniele Mona who plays synthesizers. They are best known for their 2023 hit "Italodisco", which peaked at number one in Italy and charted in several European charts.

The group won season 14 of the Italian talent show Amici di Maria De Filippi, coached by Elisa, and has released three studio albums: I Want (2014), Out (2015) and You (2017), singing both in Italian and English. Since their debut, the band has sold over 650,000 copies in Italy and won many accolades, including three Wind Music Awards, one MTV Italian Music Awards, and one Kid's Choice Award. They have been selected to compete at Sanremo Music Festival three times with "Frida (mai, mai, mai)" (2018), "Un ragazzo una ragazza" (2024), and "Tu con chi fai l'amore" (2025).

== History ==
The band rose to prominence in 2010 when they became the resident band of Le Scimmie, a famous club in Milan. Since that they opened concerts for Gossip, Hurts and Paolo Nutini. In 2014 the producer Vichi Lombardo and the singers and producers Elio and Rocco Tanica noticed the group, making their first album I Want and single "I Don't Give a Funk".

In 2015, The Kolors participated in season 14 of the TV program Amici di Maria De Filippi, on Elisa's team. In the finale on 5 June 2015 the band won the talent show and the Premio della Critica given by the journalists. While competing on the show, they released the English language single "Everytime", which reached the sixth position of the Italian singles chart and was certified platinum. On May 19, 2015, the band released its second studio album Out, which peaked at number one on FIMI's albums chart and went on to sell over 200,000 copies. Later that year, The Kolors performed at the 2015 MTV Italian Music Awards and released their second single from the album "Why Don't You Love Me?".

On April 15, 2017, the band announced that it would be releasing a new song, "What Happened Last Night", featuring Gucci Mane and Daddy's Groove. The track served as the lead single for their third studio album, You, which was released on May 19, 2017. The album debuted at number four in the Italian charts, supported by the singles "Crazy" and "Don't Understand".

In February 2018 the band competed at the Sanremo Music Festival with the song "Frida (mai, mai, mai)", their first strictly Italian language record. Frida became their second single to reach the top ten of the Italian charts. After signing with Universal Music Italia in May 2018, they released "Come le onde" with rapper J-Ax. In September 2018 the band's frontman, Stash, was chosen to be a singing coach and judge for season 18 of Amici di Maria De Filippi.

In May 2019 they released the collaboration with Italian singer Elodie "Pensare male", which peaked at number 24 on the Italian Singles Chart and was certified platinum. Pensare male would become the most listened-to Italian language song on the radio in 2019. In September 2019, it was confirmed that Stash would return as a singing coach and judge for season 19 of Amici. In May 2020 the band was cast for the spin-off Amici Speciali released a new single, "Non è vero". In 2021 the band published the FIMI platinum single "Cabriolet Panorama", which anticipated their compilation album Singles.

In April 2023 the band departed from Island Records and signed with Warner Music Italy. Their first single with the label, "Italodisco", peaked at number one on the Italian Singles Chart and charted in several other European charts, becoming a top-ten song in Switzerland and Poland. The Kolors competed in the Sanremo Music Festival 2024 with the song "Un ragazzo una ragazza". In December 2024, they were announced among the participants in the 2025 festival with "Tu con chi fai l'amore", finally placing 13th.

== Controversies ==
In 2016 at the MTV Italian Music Awards, the band was criticized for their behavior during the performance, during which Stash spat at the camera. Moreover, at the end of the song they got off the stage without listening to the presenter Francesco Mandelli who was about to give them the MTV History Award. Afterwards the singer apologized to the presenter and the award ceremony.

In 2018, after a guest performance on Amici, the host and producer of the format, Maria De Filippi, revealed a background of the band's entry into the talent show in 2016 by declaring: "When Stash and his band were chosen to be the challengers, the editorial staff told me they didn't exist: there were no documents proving who he was". The front-man replied, "I had falsified the documents: I said I was a year younger in the office because I thought I was too old to be in the school. That's the way it is in Naples: you always find the solution to the problem!"

In the summer of 2018 Stash received facial injury when he was involved in a fight to defend a girl who had been beaten in public by her partner. The singer says, "When you see an injustice, when you see that someone needs your kindness and someone else deserves your violence, act. Help, help yourselves."

== Members ==
Current members

- Antonio Alex Stash Fiordispino – vocals, guitars, piano, synthesizer, drums (2009–present)
- Alessandro "Alex" Fiordispino – drums, percussion (2009–present)
- Dario Iaculli – bass (2023–present)

Former members

- Alessandro Tammaro – bass (2009–2012)
- Daniele Mona – synthesizer, bass, percussion (2010–2022)

== Discography ==
=== Studio albums ===
Title	Details	Peak chart positions	Certifications
Title	Details	ITA	Certifications
I Want	Released: 19 May 2014; Label: Mr Boost, It-Why Distribuzione; Format: CD, digital download	54	
Out	Released: 19 May 2015; Label: Baraonda Edizioni Musicali; Format: CD, digital download	1	ITA: 4× Platinum
You	Released: 19 May 2017; Label: Baraonda Edizioni Musicali; Format: CD, digital download	4	

=== Compilation albums ===
Title	Details	Peak chart positions
Title	Details	ITA Vinyl
Singles	Released: 18 June 2021; Label: Island Records; Format: Vinyl, streaming	11

=== Singles ===
==== As lead artist ====
Title	Year	Peak chart positions						Certifications	Album
Title	Year	ITA	AUT	BLR	LIT	POL	SWI	Certifications	Album
"Everytime"	2015	6	—	*		—	—	FIMI: Platinum	Out
"Me Minus You"	2015	62	—	*		—	—	FIMI: Gold	Out
"Why Don't You Love Me?"	2015	67	—	*		—	—		Out
"OK"	2015	64	—	*		—	—		Out – Deluxe Edition
"What Happened Last Night?" (featuring Gucci Mane and Daddy's Groove)	2017	76	—	*		—	—		You
"Crazy"	2017	—	—	*		—	—		You
"Don't Understand"	2017	—	—	*		—	—		You
"Frida (mai, mai, mai)"	2018	10	—	*	—	—	—		Non-album singles
"Come le onde" (featuring J-Ax)	2018	45	—	*	—	—	—		Non-album singles
"Pensare male" (with Elodie)	2019	24	—	*	—	—	—	FIMI: Platinum	Singles
"Los Angeles" (featuring Gué Pequeno)	2019	96	—	*	—	—	—		Singles
"Non è vero"	2020	—	—	*	—	—	—		Singles
"Mal di gola"	2021	—	—	*	—	—	—		Singles
"Cabriolet Panorama"	2021	45	—	*	—	—	—	FIMI: Platinum	Singles
"Leoni al sole"	2021	—	—	*	—	—	—		Non-album singles
"Blackout"	2022	—	—	*	—	—	—		Non-album singles
"Italodisco"	2023	1	8	1	6	4	4	FIMI: 6× Platinum; IFPI AUT: Platinum; IFPI SWI: Platinum; ZPAV: 2× Diamond	Non-album singles
"Un ragazzo una ragazza"	2024	7	—	58	—	—	37	FIMI: 2× Platinum; ZPAV: Gold	Non-album singles
"Karma"	2024	17	—	—	—	—	—	FIMI: Platinum	Non-album singles
"Tu con chi fai l'amore"	2025	6	—	—	—	—	—	FIMI: Platinum	Non-album singles
"Pronto come va"	2025	30	—	—	—	—	—	FIMI: Gold	Non-album singles
"—" denotes items which were not released in that country or failed to chart. "*" denotes the chart did not exist at that time.

==== As featured artist ====
Title	Year	Album or EP
"Nella pancia della balena" (Samuel Heron featuring The Kolors)	2020	Non-album singles
"Solero" (Lorenzo Fragola featuring The Kolors)	2021	Non-album singles

== Awards and nominations ==
Award	Year	Category	Nominee(s)	Result	Ref.
Golden Headphones Radio Award	2016	Best Radio Artist	The Kolors	Won	
Kids' Choice Awards	2016	Favorite Italian Music Artist	The Kolors	Nominated	
Kids' Choice Awards	2024	Favorite Italian Music Artist	The Kolors	Pending	
Lunezia Award	2016	Italian International Breakthrough	The Kolors	Won	
MTV Europe Music Awards	2023	Best Italian Act	The Kolors	Nominated	
MTV Italian Music Awards	2016	Best Italian Band	The Kolors	Nominated	
MTV Italian Music Awards	2016	Best Live Performance	The Kolors	Won	
MTV Italian Music Awards	2016	MTV History Award	The Kolors	Won	
Music Awards	2015	Goldend Disc Award	Out	Won	
Music Awards	2016	Platinum Single Award	"Everytime"	Won	
Music Awards	2016	Multi Platinum Disc Award	Out	Won	
Music Awards	2023	Multi Platinum Single Award	"Italodisco"	Won	
Music Awards	2023	TIM Summer Hits Award	"Italodisco"	Won	
Music Awards	2023	Earone Radio Award	The Kolors	Won	
