= Cesare Cremonini discography =

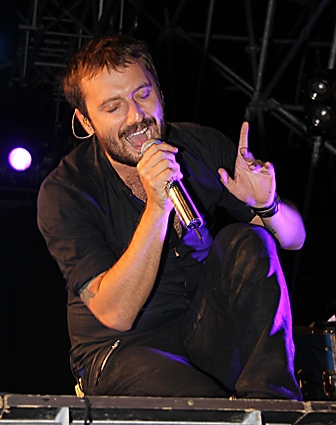
- Studio albums: 9
- Live albums: 4
- Compilation albums: 3
- Singles: 41
- Video albums: 1
- Music videos: 40

The discography of Cesare Cremonini, an Italian singer-songwriter, consists of nine studio albums, forty-one singles, three compilation albums and four live albums.

== Albums ==
=== Studio albums ===
List of albums, with chart positions and certifications
Title	Album details	Peak chart positions	Certifications
Title	Album details	ITA	Certifications
Bagus	Released: 15 November 2002; Label: Warner Music Italy; Format: CD	9	ITA: 2× Platinum
Maggese	Released: 10 June 2005; Label: Warner Music Italy; Format: CD	7	ITA: Platinum
Il primo bacio sulla Luna	Released: 26 September 2008; Label: Warner Music Italy; Format: CD, download	6	ITA: Platinum
La teoria dei colori	Released: 22 May 2012; Label: Tre Cuori, Universal; Format: CD, download	2	ITA: 3× Platinum
Logico	Released: 6 May 2014; Label: Tre Cuori, Universal; Format: CD, download, streaming	1	ITA: Platinum
Possibili scenari	Released: 24 November 2017; Label: Tre Cuori, Universal; Format: CD, download, streaming	1	ITA: 2× Platinum
La ragazza del futuro	Released: 25 February 2022; Label: Universal; Format: CD, download, streaming	2	ITA: Gold
Alaska Baby	Released: 29 November 2024; Label: Universal, EMI; Format: CD, download, streaming	1	ITA: 2× Platinum
Amateur	Released: 22 October 2026; Label: Universal, EMI; Format: CD, download, streaming	1	

=== Live albums ===
List of albums, with chart positions and certifications
Title	Album details	Peak chart positions	Certifications
Title	Album details	ITA	Certifications
1+8+24	Released: 24 November 2006; Label: Warner Music Italy; Format: CD+DVD, download	37	
Più che logico	Released: 26 May 2015; Label: Tre Cuori, Universal; Formats: 2× CD, download	2	FIMI: Platinum
Cremonini Live: Stadi 2022	Released: 22 October 2024; Label: Tre Cuori, Universal; Formats: LP, CD, download	5	
Cremonini Live 2025	Released: 21 November 2025; Label: Tre Cuori, Universal; Formats: LP, CD, download	2	

=== Compilation albums ===
List of albums, with chart positions and certifications
Title	Album details	Peak chart positions	Certifications
Title	Album details	ITA	Certifications
1999–2010 The Greatest Hits	Released: 25 May 2010; Label: Warner Music Italy; Format: CD, download	3	ITA: 2× Platinum
Cremonini 2C2C: The Best Of	Released: 29 November 2019; Label: Universal Music Italy; Format: CD, download, streaming	1	ITA: 2× Platinum

== Singles ==
=== As lead artist ===
List of singles, with chart positions and certifications, showing year released and album name
Title	Year	Peak chart positions	Certifications	Album
Title	Year	ITA	Certifications	Album
"Gli uomini e le donne sono uguali"	2002	8		Bagus
"Vieni a vedere perché"	2002	3	ITA: Platinum	Bagus
"PadreMadre"	2003	21	ITA: Gold	Bagus
"Latin lover"	2003	20	ITA: Gold	Bagus
"Gongi Boy"	2003	13		Bagus
"Marmellata #25"	2005	11	ITA: 2× Platinum	Maggese
"Maggese"	2005	41		Maggese
"Le tue parole fanno male"	2006	38		Maggese
"Ancora un po'"	2006	48		Maggese
"Dev'essere così"	2006	—		1+8+24
"Dicono di me"	2008	10	ITA: Platinum	Il primo bacio sulla Luna
"Le sei e ventisei"	2008	—	ITA: Gold	Il primo bacio sulla Luna
"Figlio di un re"	2009	—		Il primo bacio sulla Luna
"Il pagliaccio"	2009	—		Il primo bacio sulla Luna
"L'altra metà"	2009	—		Il primo bacio sulla Luna
"Mondo" (featuring Jovanotti)	2010	4	ITA: Platinum	1999–2010 The Greatest Hits
"Hello!" (featuring Malika Ayane)	2010	7	ITA: Gold	1999–2010 The Greatest Hits
"Il comico (Sai che risate)"	2012	13	ITA: Platinum	La teoria dei colori
"Una come te"	2012	30	ITA: Gold	La teoria dei colori
"La nuova stella di Broadway"	2013	9	ITA: 4× Platinum	La teoria dei colori
"I Love You"	2013	38		La teoria dei colori
"Logico #1"	2014	4	ITA: 3× Platinum	Logico
"GreyGoose"	2014	16	ITA: 2× Platinum	Logico
"Io e Anna"	2015	—		Logico
"Buon viaggio (Share the Love)"	2015	6	ITA: 4× Platinum	Più che logico – Live
"Lost in the Weekend"	2016	46	ITA: Platinum	Più che logico – Live
"Eccolo qua il Natale (Una notte tra tante)" (with Massena Boys)	2016	2		Non-album single
"Poetica"	2017	2	ITA: 3× Platinum	Possibili scenari
"Nessuno vuole essere Robin"	2018	28	ITA: Platinum	Possibili scenari
"Kashmir-Kashmir"	2018	77	ITA: Gold	Possibili scenari
"Possibili scenari"	2018	66	ITA: Gold	Possibili scenari
"Al telefono"	2019	53	ITA: Gold	Cremonini 2C2C – The Best Of
"Giovane stupida"	2020	—		Cremonini 2C2C – The Best Of
"Colibrì"	2021	94	ITA: Gold	La ragazza del futuro
"La ragazza del futuro"	2022	87	ITA: Gold	La ragazza del futuro
"Ora che non ho più te"	2024	1	ITA: 3× Platinum	Alaska Baby
"San Luca" (featuring Luca Carboni)	2024	28	ITA: Gold	Alaska Baby
"Nonostante tutto" (with Elisa)	2025	17	ITA: Platinum	Alaska Baby
"Alaska Baby"	2025	93		Alaska Baby
"Ragazze facili"	2025	91		Alaska Baby
"Paparazzi" (solo or with Fabri Fibra)	2026	47		Amateur

=== As featured artist ===
List of singles, with chart positions in Italy, showing year released and album name
Title	Year	Peak chart positions	Certification	Album
Title	Year	ITA	Certification	Album
"Domani 21/04.09" (as part of Artisti Uniti per l'Abruzzo)	2009	1	ITA: 2× Platinum	Charity single
"The Creationist" (Kerli featuring Cesare Cremonini)	2009	—		Love Is Dead

== Other charted songs ==
List of other charted songs, with chart positions, showing year released and album name
Title	Year	Peak chart positions	Album
Title	Year	ITA	Album
"Aurore boreali" (featuring Elisa)	2024	64	Alaska Baby
"Amateur" (with Salmo)	2026	73	Amateur
"Cose molto piccole" (with Malika Ayane)	2026	91	Amateur

== Other appearances ==
List of other album appearances
Title	Year	Album
"Innocenti evasioni"	2006	Innocenti evasioni by Various Artists
"Un cuore giovane" (Mario Venuti featuring Cesare Cremonini)	2009	Recidivo by Mario Venuti
"Believe in Love" (Malika Ayane featuring Cesare Cremonini)	2010	Grovigli by Malika Ayane
"I pesci grossi" (Jovanotti featuring Cesare Cremonini)	2011	Ora by Jovanotti
"L'orgia"	2012	...Io ci sono by Various Artists
"Gli anni" (Max Pezzali featuring Cesare Cremonini)	2013	Max 20 by Max Pezzali
