= Nonostante tutto =

Single by Cesare Cremonini and Elisa

from the album Alaska Baby
- Language: Italian
- Released: 11 April 2025
- Studio: Mille Galassie Studios (Bologna)
- Genre: Electropop
- Length: 4:27
- Label: Epic; Universal
- Songwriters: Cesare Cremonini; Elisa Toffoli
- Producers: Cremonini; Alessio Natalizia; Toffoli

Cesare Cremonini singles chronology
| "San Luca" (2024) | "Nonostante tutto" (2025) | "Alaska Baby" (2025) |

Elisa singles chronology
| "Dillo solo al buio" (2024) | "Nonostante tutto" (2025) | "Sesso debole" (2025) |

Music video
- "Nonostante tutto" on YouTube

"Nonostante tutto" is a song recorded by Italian singers Cesare Cremonini and Elisa. It was released on 11 April 2025 through Epic Records and Universal Music Italy as the third single from Cremonini's eighth studio album Alaska Baby.

== Background ==
After the release of the seventh studio album La ragazza del futuro, Cremonini embarked on the Cremonini negli Stadi Tour, from which were taken the double live singles of "Poetica" and "Io e Anna"/"Anche fragile" in collaboration with Elisa. After Cremonini's travel to the United States in 2023, the two artists reunited at the singer-songwriter's recording studio, Mille Galassie Studios in Bologna, where Elisa wrote the tracks "Un alba rosa" and "Aurore boreali" for Cremonini's eighth studio album. In February 2025, the two artists said they were in the recording studio and had been writing and composing new songs together.

== Composition ==
"Nonostante tutto", written and composed by the two artists with the production collaboration of Alessio Natalizia, is the second collaboration between the two artists after the track "Aurore boreali". Cremonini explained the meaning of the song and its recording and writing process:

"Elisa and I met when we were at the beginning of our careers. We waited twenty-five years in music to share such an intimate and profound moment as writing. Working together we fulfilled a dream and a promise, discovering that we could be a temple for each other in studio work. The bond with Elisa stimulates my relationship with the present, in writing, producing, and continuing to treat pop as an art form. Nevertheless, she represents us fully at this time because she reveals one of our many commonalities: the dark side from which our passion for music stems, when it is an inexhaustible source of happiness."

Elisa made a statement about the artistic collaboration with Cremonini:

"This collaboration with Cesare was born from a very deep artistic exchange, despite the many collaborations I have been lucky enough to do in life, this one with Cesare is special because it is so 360° that it makes me feel like we are a band, a duo. The space and the trust he has given me in the studio has allowed me to express myself completely, not only as a singer but also as a songwriter and as an arranger and producer, and I will never end thanking him for having this very inspiring approach. I really like the way he thinks, the way he creates, I respect him a lot so this experience was like a confidence boost for me, and at the same time a philosophical exchange, and a musical journey without boundarie."

== Critics reception ==
The song received positive reviews from Italian music critics, who appreciated its production and writing, as well as the juxtaposition of the artists' two vocal talents, associating it with the previous collaboration "Aurore boreali" released on the album.

Alessandro Alicandri of TV Sorrisi e Canzoni analyzed that on "Aurore boreali" we already experienced "the strength of their voices and a union between two musical worlds that prioritize imagery and intensity of emotions" in the new collaboration it is "renewed in a very powerful song" with electropop and funk sounds. Alicandri focused on the length of the song, associating it with "Ora che non ho più te", since "in the last minute, all sonic, there is a wild finale to dance to and 27 seconds dedicated to the closing of the song, as when it was a concert, as when in life and in music everything was really possible".

Gianni Sibilla of Rockol also compared the two collaborations on the project, writing that if in "Aurore boreali" there is "an ethereal, electronic, complex, and out-of-the-box song" in "Nonostante tutto" the artists "really explore pop, declaring their love for the genre", calling it a "meta-song". The critic wrote that the song "starts out as a classic Cremonini song, vocals and keyboards, then opens into a straight bass drum with Elisa's voice repeating the chorus on a loop [with] a 90s house piano turn" adding "electronic elements, more synths, drops and the two voices intertwining".

All Music Italia's Alvise Salerno wrote that the song "delves into Cremonini's more electronic side, the one that takes us back to the days of Logico, in which Elisa fits in perfectly", finding it with an "international sound",’ in which "there are no harmonizations between the two, only a meeting in the chorus with the former singing an octave below when compared to the latter" giving a "beautifully organic result". Andrea Silenzi, reviewing the track for La Repubblica, wrote that the sounds featured "pop mixing with 80' electronics" which "harkens back to a different world than the songwriting style of the two artists".

== Music video ==
The music video for the song was released simultaneously with the release of the song on Cremonini's YouTube channel. The video was directed by Enea Colombi and choreographed by Macia Del Prete and Alessandro Ubaldi.

Patrizia Chimera of La Gazzetta dello Sport wrote about the choreography performed in the video, describing the dance crew as "kaleidoscopic" capable of "rendering an installation and at times pictorial image of the song" that could give "life to the sensual energy and communicative power of the song".

== Charts ==
=== Weekly charts ===
Chart performance for "Nonostante tutto"
| Chart (2025) | Peak position |
|---|---|
| Italy (FIMI) | 17 |
| Italy (EarOne Airplay) | 2 |

=== Year-end charts ===
Year-end chart performance for "Nonostante tutto"
| Chart (2022) | Position |
|---|---|
| Italy (FIMI) | 57 |

== Certifications ==
Certifications for "Nonostante tutto"
| Region | Certification | Certified units/sales |
|---|---|---|
| Italy (FIMI) | Platinum | 200,000^{‡} |
^{‡} Sales+streaming figures based on certification alone.
