= Baciami ancora =

Baciami ancora (Italian for 'Kiss me again') may refer to:

- Baciami ancora (film), a 2010 film by Gabriele Muccino
- "Baciami ancora" (song), a 2010 song by Jovanotti
