= Mare mare =

Single by Luca Carboni

from the album Carboni
- Released: 1992
- Length: 4:38
- Label: BMG-Ariola
- Songwriters: Mauro Malavasi, Luca Carboni
- Producer: Mauro Malavasi

Luca Carboni singles chronology
"Ci vuole un fisico bestiale" (1992)	"Mare mare" (1992)	"Vedo risorgere il Sole" (1992)

Music video
- "Mare mare" on YouTube

"Mare mare" (lit. "Sea sea"), also known "Mare mare (Bologna-Riccione)", is a 1992 Italian song composed by Mauro Malavasi and Luca Carboni and performed by Luca Carboni.

== Overview ==
The music was composed by Carboni at his holiday home on Elba, while the lyrics were composed almost a year later, during a car trip from Riccione to Bologna, when Carboni was already recording the album.

The song was a major summer hit, and won the 29th Festivalbar. It has been described as "an atypical tune with a melancholic but highly suggestive mood which left an indelible mark on the musical imagery of the summer."

In 2013, Carboni recorded a new version of the song in a duet with Cesare Cremonini.

== Track listing ==
No.	Title	Length
1.	"Mare mare (B.Box Remix)"	5:54
2.	"Mare mare (Radio Remix)"	4:13
3.	"Mare mare (B.Box Instrumental)"	5:53
4.	"Mare mare (Acappella)"	3:39
5.	"Mare mare (LP Version)"	4:38

== Charts ==
Chart (1992)	Peak position
Europe (European Hot 100 Singles)	64
Italy (Musica e dischi)	2
Italy (Music & Media)	1
