= Mondo (Cesare Cremonini and Jovanotti song) =

Single by Cesare Cremonini and Jovanotti

from the album 1999–2010 The Greatest Hits
- Released: 23 April 2010
- Studio: Mille Galassie Studio, Bologna, Italy
- Genre: Pop rock; pop rap
- Length: 4:43
- Label: Warner
- Songwriters: Cesare Cremonini; Lorenzo Cherubini
- Producer: Walter Mameli

Cesare Cremonini and Jovanotti singles chronology
"L'altra metà" (2009)	"Mondo" (2010)	"Hello!" (2010)

Jovanotti singles chronology
"Baciami ancora" (2010)	"Mondo" (2010)	"Tutto l'amore che ho" (2010)

"Mondo" is a song by Italian singer-songwriters Cesare Cremonini and Jovanotti. It was released on 23 April 2010 through Warner Music Italy, as the lead single from Cremonini first greatest hits album 1999–2010 The Greatest Hits.

== Composition ==
The song was the first artistic collaboration between Cremoni and Jovanotti, who also wrote the lyrics. In an interview with Rockol Cremonini explained the meaning of thes song:

"When I listened to the two unreleased tracks in the collection, "Mondo", made together with Jovanotti, "Hello!" with Malika Ayane, I realized that it was the only time my voice had changed. That made me think that it was the right time to look back and reread everything that had happened from the beginnings to now, and in ten years I have discovered so many things, both in the world of music and in my inner world, and I have always remained enthusiastic about everything. Today I think I have somehow found a balance that I hope to bring with me to future records as well."

== Music video ==
The music video for the song, directed by Gabriele Muccino, was released on January 1, 2010, through the singer's YouTube channel.

== Charts ==
=== Weekly charts ===
Chart (2010)	Peak position
Italy (FIMI)	4
Italy Airplay (EarOne)	1

=== Year-end charts ===
Chart (2010)	Position
Italy (FIMI)	15
Italy Airplay (EarOne)	1

== Certifications ==
Certifications for "Mondo"
Region	Certification	Certified units/sales
Italy (FIMI)	Platinum	30,000^{*}
^{*} Sales figures based on certification alone.
