= Un amore perfetto =

- Directed by: Valerio Andrei
- Written by: Cristiana Farina; Luca Monesi
- Produced by: Roberto Alchimede; Rita Rusic Company
- Starring: Martina Stella; Cesare Cremonini; Denis Fasolo; Andrea Ascolese; Chiara Sani
- Music by: Cesare Cremonini
- Production companies: Rita Rusic Company; Movieweb S.p.a.
- Distributed by: Columbia TriStar Films Italia
- Release date: 25 January 2002 (Italy)
- Running time: 95 minutes
- Country: Italy
- Language: Italian

Un amore perfetto is a 2002 Italian romantic comedy film directed by Valerio Andrei. It stars Cesare Cremonini at his fim debut, who at the time was the lead singer of Italian music group Lùnapop; Martina Stella, and Denis Fasolo.

== Plot ==
Ceghe (Cremonini) and Berni (Fasolo) are close friends who are both uneasily transitioning into their adult lives. They meet Laura (Stella) one evening at a nightclub, and the three rapidly become a close group who share "a perfect love." However, romantic impulses between Laura and each of the two men eventually threaten to tear the old friends apart.

As this scenario unfolds, Ceghe becomes aware of a lucrative opportunity to sell a valuable item possessed by guests of the hotel run by his parents. The circumstances and risks of the opportunity are unclear, but Ceghe becomes increasingly determined to make a fortune by stealing and selling the item.

== Cast ==
- Martina Stella as Laura
- Cesare Cremonini as Cè
- Denis Fasolo as Berni
- Chiara Sani as Vicinona
- Maria Mazza as Betty

Rest of cast listed alphabetically:

- Andrea Ascolese as Nanna
- Piergiorgio Fasolo
- Mascia Foschi
- Evelina Manna
- Mauro Mercatali
- Elisabetta Rocchetti
- Luca Viale

== Reception ==
Reviewers generally described the plot of Un amore perfetto as lightweight fare. They considered the film primarily a marketing vehicle, created to capitalize on the popularity of Cremonini and Stella.
