= Santa Maria della Misericordia, Bologna =

Historic Roman Catholic church in Bologna, Italy

Coordinates: 44.48465°N 11.34907°E

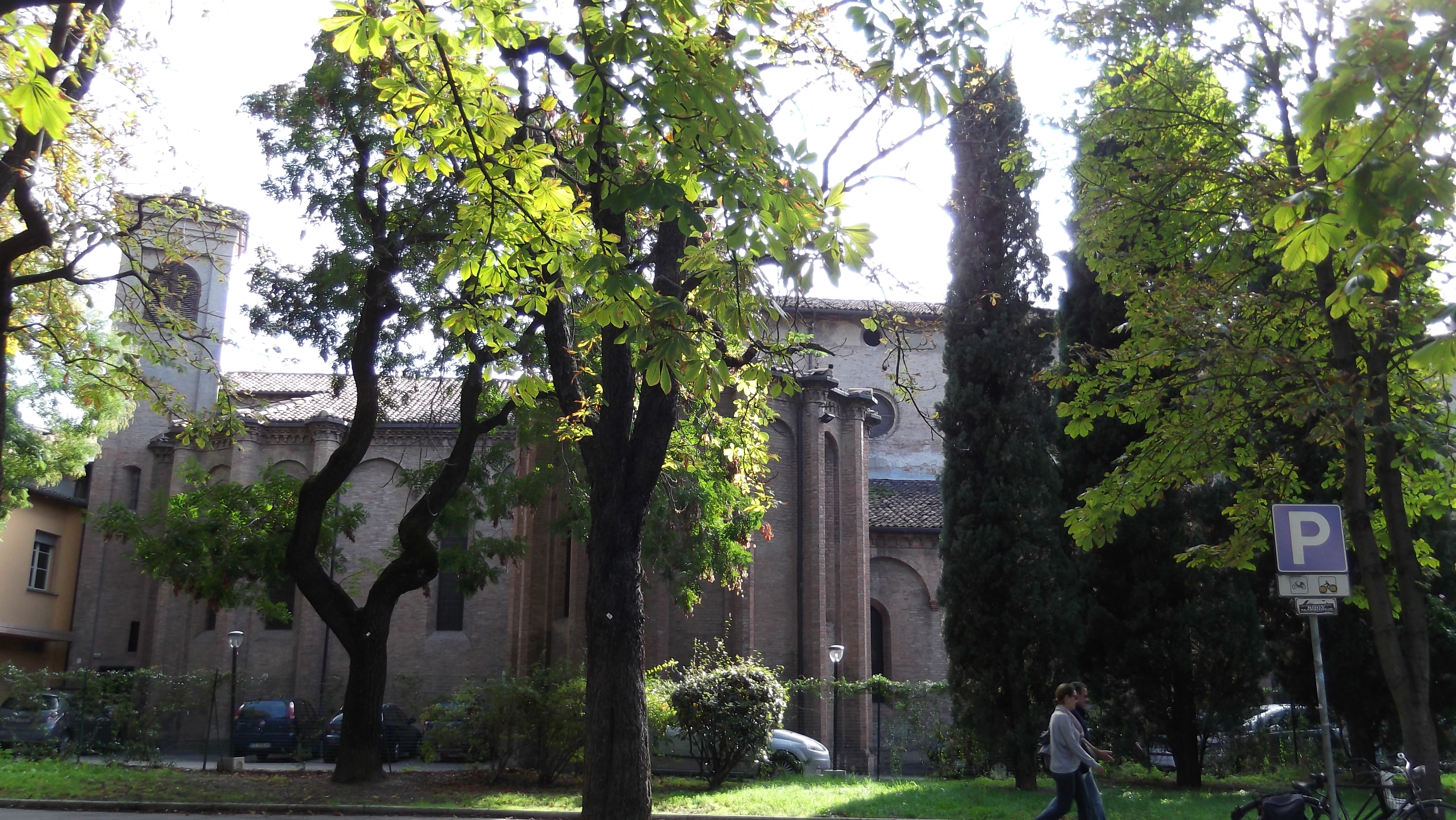

Santa Maria della Misericordia is a Renaissance-style Roman Catholic church located on Piazza di Porta Castiglione #4 in Bologna, region of Emilia Romagna, Italy. It stands adjacent to the Giardini Margherita and Viale Giovanni Gozzadini.

A church at this site, outside of the city walls, was rebuilt in 1432 by the Olivetan order. The church was then acquired by an Augustinian order of Friars, who added the portico in the late 15th-century. The interior houses works by various important artists including a fresco (moved to canvas) depicting the Madonna dell'Umiltà (1397) by Lippo di Dalmasio. There are also works by Bartolommeo Ramenghi (il Bagnacavallo), Bartolomeo Cesi, Vincenzo Spisanelli, Ubaldo Gandolfi and Francesco Francia.
