= Lost in the Weekend =

Single by Cesare Cremonini

from the album Più che logico (Live)
- Released: 4 September 2015
- Studio: Mille Galassie Studio, Bologna, Italy
- Genre: Electropop; funk
- Length: 3:54
- Label: Universal; Trecuori srl
- Songwriters: Cesare Cremonini; Davide Petrella
- Producer: Walter Mameli

Cesare Cremonini singles chronology
"Buon viaggio (Share the Love)" (2015)	"Lost in the Weekend" (2015)	"Eccolo qua il Natale (Una notte tra tante)" (2015)

Music video
- "Lost in the Weekend" on YouTube

"Lost in the Weekend" is a song by Italian singer-songwriter Cesare Cremonini. It was released on 4 September 2015 through Universal Music Italy and Trecuori srl, as the second single from his second live album Più che logico (Live).

== Composition ==
The song, written by Cremonini with Davide Petrella and produced by Walter Mameli, has electropop and funk music references. In an interiwew with Il Giornale singer explained the inspiration of the song:

"It reminds me of Vasco Rossi of the 1980s when he wanted to go full throttle: this song will be the soundtrack of my fall tour."

== Critic reception ==
Mattia Marzi of Rockol defined the song as a sequel of "Logico #1", in which "electropop sounds are present in a more pronounced way" with "keyboards and synthesizers called upon to bring to mind the hits of music from funk and dance-pop". Luca of La Repubblica stated that "no one among the stars of Italian music has written a song of this quality in the past decade", associating the sounds to "Yuppies" by Luca Barbarossa.

== Music video ==
The music video for the song, directed by Gaetano Morbioli, was released on September 4, 2015, through the singer's YouTube channel.

== Charts ==
Chart (2015)	Peak position
Italy (FIMI)	46
Italy Airplay (EarOne)	1

== Certifications ==
Certifications for "Lost in the Weekend"
Region	Certification	Certified units/sales
Italy (FIMI)	Platinum	50,000^{‡}
^{‡} Sales+streaming figures based on certification alone.
