= Nessuno vuole essere Robin =

Single by Cesare Cremonini

from the album Possibili scenari
- Released: 23 February 2018
- Recorded: 2016–2017, Mille Galassie Studio, Bologna, Italy; Orchestra: AIR, London, UK
- Genre: Power ballad; pop
- Length: 4:42
- Label: Universal; Trecuori srl
- Songwriter: Cesare Cremonini
- Producer: Walter Mameli

Cesare Cremonini singles chronology
"Poetica" (2017)	"Nessuno vuole essere Robin" (2018)	"Kashmir-Kashmir" (2018)

Music video
- "Nessuno vuole essere Robin" on YouTube

"Nessuno vuole essere Robin" is a song by Italian singer-songwriter Cesare Cremonini. It was released on 23 February 2018 through Universal Music Italy and Trecuori srl, as the second single from his sixth studio album Possibili scenari.

== Composition ==
The song was written by Cremonini and produced by Walter Mameli, was described by the singer as his second "Marmellata n. 25" (2005). In an interview with TV Sorrisi e Canzoni Cremonini explained the meaning of the song:

"This piece, which is very autobiographical, allows itself to play with relationships, putting the dog at the center between man and woman as if it were the watershed of our human, personal, family relationships. The main character is me desperately asking to sleep with my loved one, even promising not to touch her (laughs) ... and she finds the excuse "No, I have to sleep with the dog." At this point I, dressed as Robin -- I already have the video in mind -- leave and tell her all kinds of things, because ... we all have the number 10 in our backs, but then we miss penalties. The song, through the joke, hides a deep loneliness."

== Music video ==
The music video for the song, directed by Giorgio J. Squarcia, was released on February 22, 2018, through the singer's YouTube channel.

== Charts ==
=== Weekly charts ===
Chart (2018)	Peak position
Italy (FIMI)	28
Italy Airplay (EarOne)	3

=== Year-end charts ===
Chart (2018)	Position
Italy (FIMI)	96

== Certifications ==
Certifications for "Nessuno vuole essere Robin"
Region	Certification	Certified units/sales
Italy (FIMI)	Platinum	50,000^{‡}
^{‡} Sales+streaming figures based on certification alone.
