= Alaska Baby =

Studio album by Cesare Cremonini
- Released: November 29, 2024
- Recorded: 2023–2024
- Studios: British Grove Studios, London; Mille Galassie Studios, Bologna
- Genre: Pop
- Length: 53:25 (standard); 57:52 (deluxe)
- Language: Italian
- Labels: Universal Music Italy; EMI
- Producers: Cesare Cremonini; Alessandro De Crescenzo; Alessandro Magnanini; Alessio Natalizia; Elisa Toffoli

Cesare Cremonini chronology
La ragazza del futuro (2022)	Alaska Baby (2024)

Singles from Alaska Baby
- 1. "Ora che non ho più te" Released: 24 September 2024; 2. "San Luca" Released: 6 December 2024; 3. "Nonostante tutto" Released: 11 April 2025; 4. "Alaska Baby" Released: 23 September 2025; 5. "Ragazze facili" Released: 28 November 2025

Alaska Baby is the eighth studio album by Italian singer-songwriter Cesare Cremonini, released by Universal Music Italy and EMI on 29 November 2024.

== Background and release ==
After the release of his seventh studio album, La ragazza del futuro, in 2022, Cremonini embarked on the Cremonini negli Stadi Tour, from which both the double live singles "Poetica (Live)" and "Io e Anna/Anche fragile" were taken in collaboration with Elisa while also appearing on the live album Cremonini Live: Stadi 2022 + Imola.

In 2023, Cremonini took a recording hiatus and embarked on a trip to the United States, especially between Alaska and the cities of New York City, Nashville, Memphis and Los Angeles. The trip inspired the singer-songwriter to write and record new music, announcing the release of his eighth studio album on November 5, 2024.

== Composition and recording ==
The recording project is composed of twelve tracks, written and produced by Cremonini himself with the collaboration of Alessio Natalizia, Alessandro De Crescenzo, Alessandro Magnanini, Davide Petrella, Meduza and Elisa. The string arrangements are handled by Davide Rossi. The album was recorded at the Mille Galassie Studio in Bologna and at the British Grove Studios in London, with collaboration by Mike Garson and Nick Patrick. Cremonini recounted the meaning of the project and its conception in an interview with Billboard Italia:

"I found out what I wanted to do with Alaska Baby as I went along, during its making. Because art is sometimes a kind of North Star that you start following and it takes you where it wants to go. At first, I won't hide from you that I thought this album was a kind of final act, after releasing a series of singles. I was coming from an album, La ragazza del futuro, which was very conceptual, it was born during the pandemic. It didn't have as many conceptually constructed references over time. It was a very concrete, pragmatic record. Whereas Alaska Baby over time became, compared to the previous one, baroque, rich in detail. It became gigantic in my hands. True, there are a lot of references to international music of today or at any rate of the recent past. They are always there in my music, it is not a new thing. Like the fact that I love the 1970s, they always win me over when listening."

== Promotion ==
=== Singles ===
On 24 September 2024, the single "Ora che non ho più te" was released, which peaked at number one on the Italian singles chart. Then it reached the first position. The second single "San Luca" featuring Luca Carboni was published on 6 December 2025. After a second recording season in February 2025, Creomonini published the third official single "Nonostante tutto" written and performed with Elisa. The album's title track was released as its fourth single on 23 September 2025. "Ragazze facili" was sent to Italian radio as the fifth single from the album on 28 November 2025.

=== Documentary ===
The record project was accompanied by a documentary of the same name as the album for the Disney+ platform. The documentary chronicles the singer-songwriter's trip to Alaska and the genesis and production of the album.

== Critical reception ==
Gianni Sibilla of Rockol described the album as "an opera", in which the songs "play with structures, sounds, and genres, moving from orchestral pop to electronica with everything in between", and addresses "metaphorically the search for self and rebirth", finding the collaborations to be "spiritual". Gianmarco Aimi of Rolling Stone Italia wrote that the album "explores themes such as rebirth, the courage to love, and the desire to go beyond one's limits" with sounds of "brit pop, songwriting, Beck-like hypnotic grooves, and refrains that pay homage to the Beatles", appreciating the choice of collaborations.

Gianni Poglio of Panorama stated that the album holds together "the groove attitude, electronics and reminiscences of the 1970s” believing that it "effectively portrays the craft of being an artist". Gian Marco Sandri of The Hollywood Reporter Roma wrote that Alaska Baby is "a composite work with many musical faces", in which there are alternating tracks in which "the narrative is by snapshots, in other tracks the mental images are set in motion, they become narrated scenes". The journalist emphasized the theme of "light and dark, metaphorical images that make us think about the light and dark parts of each of us", found in the tracks "Aurore Boreali", "Dark Room" and "San Luca".

== Track listing ==
Alaska Baby track listing
No.	Title	Writer(s)	Producer(s)	Length
1.	"Alaska Baby"	Cesare Cremonini; Davide Petrella	Cremonini; Alessandro De Crescenzo	4:46
2.	"Ora che non ho più te"	Cremonini; Petrella	Cremonini; De Crescenzo; Alessio Natalizia	5:03
3.	"Aurore boreali" (featuring Elisa)	Cremonini; Elisa Toffoli	Cremonini; Toffoli	4:48
4.	"Ragazze facili"	Cremonini	Cremonini	4:02
5.	"Dark Room" (featuring Mike Garson)	Cremonini	Cremonini; De Crescenzo	4:19
6.	"San Luca" (featuring Luca Carboni)	Cremonini; Petrella	Cremonini; Alessandro Magnanini	5:33
7.	"Un'alba rosa"	Cremonini; Toffoli	Cremonini; Magnanini	4:58
8.	"Streaming"	Cremonini; Petrella	Cremonini; De Crescenzo; Natalizia	4:37
9.	"Limoni"	Cremonini; Petrella	Cremonini; De Crescenzo; Natalizia	3:34
10.	"Il mio cuore è già tuo" (featuring Meduza)	Cremonini; Petrella	Cremonini; De Crescenzo	4:13
11.	"Una poesia"	Cremonini	Cremonini; De Crescenzo	3:05
12.	"Acrobati"	Cremonini; Petrella	Cremonini; De Crescenzo	4:27
Total length:				53:25

2025 edition bonus track
No.	Title	Writer(s)	Producer(s)	Length
13.	"Nonostante tutto" (featuring Elisa)	Cremonini; Toffoli	Cremonini; Natalizia; Toffoli	4:27
Total length:				57:52

== Charts ==
=== Weekly charts ===
Weekly chart performance for Alaska Baby
Chart (2024)	Peak position
Italian Albums (FIMI)	1

=== Year-end charts ===
Year-end chart performance for Alaska Baby
Chart (2024)	Position
Italian Albums (FIMI)	49
Chart (2025)	Position
Italian Albums (FIMI)	16

== Certifications ==
Certifications for Alaska Baby
Region	Certification	Certified units/sales
Italy (FIMI)	2× Platinum	100,000^{‡}
^{‡} Sales+streaming figures based on certification alone.
