= La ragazza del futuro =

Studio album by Cesare Cremonini
- Released: February 25, 2022
- Recorded: January 2021
- Studio: London (Abbey Road Studios); Bologna (Mille Galassie Studios); Reggio Emilia (Alessandro Magnanini Studio); Copenhagen (Strings Studio)
- Genre: Pop
- Length: 48:46
- Language: Italian
- Label: Universal Music Italy; Virgin
- Producer: Cesare Cremonini; Alessandro De Crescenzo; Alessandro Magnanini

Cesare Cremonini chronology
Cremonini 2C2C - The Best Of (2019)	La ragazza del futuro (2022)	Alaska Baby (2024)

Singles from La ragazza del futuro
- 1. "Colibrì" Released: 1 December 2021; 2. "La ragazza del futuro" Released: 19 January 2022; 3. "Chimica" Released: 22 April 2022

La ragazza del futuro is the seventh studio album by Italian singer-songwriter Cesare Cremonini, released by Universal Music Italy and Virgin Records on 25 February 2022.

== Background and composition ==
After publishing his sixth studio album Possibili scenari in 2017, Cremonini take a recording hiatus, embracing the Cremonini Live 2018 Tour. In 2019 he published his third compilation album Cremonini 2C2C - The Best Of promoted by the new single "Al telefono". Between January and November 2021 Cremonini recorded and composed new songs, announcing the publication of his seventh studio album La ragazza del futuro.

The record project features fourteen tracks, written and produced by Cremonini himself with Alessandro Magnani and Alessandro De Crescenzo. The album also features collaborations by Davide Petrella, Davide Rossi, Steve Jordan and Niki Ingman. Cremonini explained the meaning of the album and its recording process in a press conference:

"This album, as then also the period we lived through, is a watershed for my career and for my life. [...] La ragazza del futuro is a record that also stems from a reflection, in my opinion, inevitable on the role of the Italian music artist today. [...] I also carry on a musical tradition, the Bolognese songwriting tradition, with an intimate look at reality. [...] I focused on songs, some visionary, that would drag me towards the future. I thought the glue could be instrumentals, simple, almost raw, rough"

== Critics reception ==
La ragazza del futuro received positive reviews by Italian critics, which prised the production and composition of the tracks and Cremonini vocal performance. The album was also considered among the best albums of 2022 by critics. Ernesto Assante of La Repubblica lists the project among the best of 2022, describing it as one capable of expressing itself with "lightness and depth” through “musically precious tales and memorable refrains".

Giulia Cavaliere of Rolling Stone Italia wrote that "Cremonini seems to seek a new dimension for the singer-songwriter self, capable precisely of detaching himself from the self, from the uniquely private matter, to rise to a we, to a collective dimension of the song, which he himself does not hesitate to call civic", making "a record that reasons about the individual's sense of responsibility in the common destiny of things, to the point of attempting to go outside himself as well to project himself into something that would like to be greater". Knight found that the songs were made "to tighten them up, to make them feel embraced in the album dimension, [...] which seeks to eschew the thought of the playlist". The magazine later placed the album at number 19 on its list of "The 25 Best Italian Albums of 2022".

Vittoria Filippi Gabardi of Vogue Italia reported that "La ragazza del futuro is an album that spans a deluge of time and many delicacies: the death of her father, the pandemic, and deep reflections on her own personal journey. It has instinct and heart, enthusiasm as a counterbalance to fear, it intercepts presences, symbolic horizons, it has a grace filled with caresses and poetry". Giulio Poglio, reviewing the album for Panorama, wrote that "the whole album is the child of the title song, the first step to put together that are pop in the best sense of the term, poetry and a look towards tomorrow". Poglio was impressed by the four entirely instrumental tracks, calling them "glue between the other ten songs".

== Tracks list ==
Alaska Baby track listing
No.	Title	Writer(s)	Producer(s)	Length
1.	"Intro"	Cesare Cremonini; Davide Rossi	Cremonini; Alessandro Magnanini	1:25
2.	"La ragazza del futuro"	Cremonini; Magnanini; Davide Petrella	Cremonini; Magnanini	4:49
3.	"Colibrì"	Cremonini; Petrella	Cremonini; Magnanini	4:35
4.	"MoonWalk"	Cremonini; Petrella	Cremonini; Magnanini	4:45
5.	"Interlude +"	Cremonini; Rossi	Cremonini; Magnanini	0:42
6.	"La fine del mondo"	Cremonini; Petrella	Cremonini; Magnanini	4:57
7.	"Chimica"	Cremonini; Petrella	Cremonini; Alessandro De Crescenzo	5:42
8.	"La camicia"	Cremonini	Cremonini; Magnanini	3:56
9.	"Interlude -"	Cremonini; Rossi	Cremonini; Magnanini	0:36
10.	"Stand up comedy"	Cremonini; Petrella	Cremonini; Magnanini	4:57
11.	"Jeky"	Cremonini; Petrella	Cremonini; Magnanini	3:12
12.	"Psyco"	Cremonini; Petrella	Cremonini; De Crescenzo	3:46
13.	"Delfini"	Cremonini; Rossi	Cremonini; Magnanini	1:01
14.	"Chiamala felicità"	Cremonini; Petrella	Cremonini; Magnanini	4:23
Total length:				48:46

== Charts ==
=== Weekly charts ===
Chart (2022)	Peak position
Italian Albums (FIMI)	2
Swiss Albums (Schweizer Hitparade)	75

=== Year-end charts ===
Chart (2022)	Peak position
Italian Albums (FIMI)	50

== Certifications ==
Certifications for La ragazza del futuro
Region	Certification	Certified units/sales
Italy (FIMI)	Gold	25,000^{‡}
^{‡} Sales+streaming figures based on certification alone.
