= Giardini Margherita =

Park in Bologna, Italy

Coordinates: 44.4835°N 11.3533°E

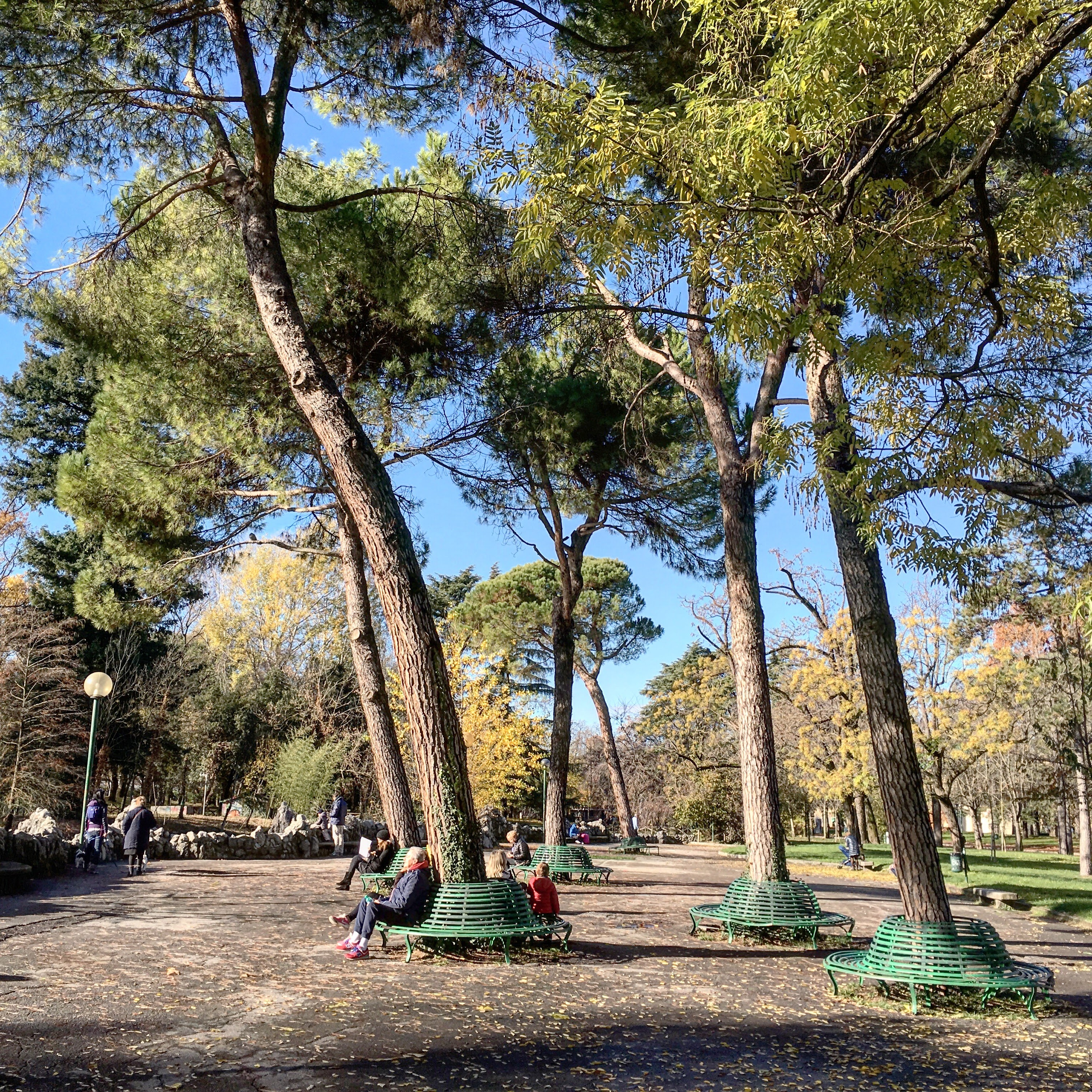
Giardini margherita bologna Italy

The Giardini Margherita is a park in Bologna, Italy, located just south of the city centre.

== History ==
The park has been opened on 6 July 1879 by the city who bought the land that was part of an ancient Convent. The project made by Ernesto Baldo Bertone di Sambuy is a typical English landscape garden, similar to Parco Sempione in Milan.

== Curiosity ==
In the main square of the park there is a liberty building, used for many years as an astronomical observatory. The use is now made almost impossible by light pollution. Remarkable Santa Maria della Misericordia, Bologna, a church.
