= Baciami ancora (song) =

Single by Jovanotti
- Released: 8 January 2010
- Genre: Pop
- Length: 4:42
- Label: Universal; Trecuori srl
- Songwriters: Lorenzo Cherubini; Saturnino Celani; Riccardo Onori
- Producer: Michele Canova

Jovanotti singles chronology
"Punto" (2009)	"Baciami ancora" (2010)	"Mondo" (2010)

"Baciami ancora" (Italian pronunciation: [ˈbaːtʃami aŋˈkoːra, -mj -]; transl. "Kiss Me Again") is a song by Italian singer-songwriter Jovanotti. It was released on 8 January 2010 through Universal Music Italy for the soundtrack of the Italian film Kiss Me Again directed by Gabriele Muccino.

The song won the David di Donatello for Best Original Song and was nominated at the Nastro d'Argento.

== Background and composition ==
After directing the music video for the song "A te" by Jovanotti, in August 2009 Gabriele Muccino annucned an artistic collaboration with Jovanotti for his 2010 film Kiss Me Again. The song was written by Jovabotti himself with Saturinino Celani and RIccardo Onori, with the music production of Michele Canova. In an interview with Variety, Jovanotti explained the meaning of the song and the relationship with Muccino:

"I had seen [Muccino] movies of course. I’m not a movie expert, but I felt that he had revolutionized the language of typical Italian cinema, that he’d brought a lot of innovation by telling stories with a different pace; by talking about a changed Italy. [...] I had decided to take a sabbatical at that time — which I do periodically to write and recharge my batteries — I wrote the song "Baciami Ancora". From then on we started hanging out. I went to see him at his home in Rome, then I visited him in Los Angeles when I went there; we spent New Year’s Eve together and we became friends, as these things happen. Unfortunately they happen quite rarely, because it’s not so often that a real friendship is born — one in which you share intimate things about yourselves sitting on a wall. "

== Music video ==
The music video for the song was the second from Jovanotti discography to be direct by Gabriele Muccino after "A te" in 2009. The video featured cameo from the film with the cast, including Stefano Accorsi, Vittoria Puccini, Pierfrancesco Favino, Claudio Santamaria, Giorgio Pasotti and Sabrina Impacciatore. It was released on January 1, 2010, through the singer's YouTube channel.

== Charts ==
=== Weekly charts ===
Chart (2010)	Peak position
Italy (FIMI)	1
Italy Airplay (EarOne)	1
Switzerland (Schweizer Hitparade)	54

=== Year-end charts ===
Chart (2010)	Peak position
Italy (FIMI)	2
Italy Airplay (EarOne)	6

== Certifications ==
Certifications for "Baciami ancora"
Region	Certification	Certified units/sales
Italy (FIMI)	3× Platinum	150,000^{‡}
^{‡} Sales+streaming figures based on certification alone.
