= Buon viaggio (Share the Love) =

Single by Cesare Cremonini

from the album Più che logico (Live)
- Released: 27 March 2015
- Studio: Mille Galassie Studio, Bologna, Italy
- Genre: Electropop; folk pop
- Length: 3:26
- Label: Universal; Trecuori srl
- Songwriters: Cesare Cremonini; Davide Petrella; Alessandro Magnanini
- Producer: Walter Mameli

Cesare Cremonini singles chronology
"Io e Anna" (2015)	"Buon viaggio (Share the Love)" (2015)	"Lost in the Weekend" (2015)

Music video
- "Buon Viaggio (Share The Love)" on YouTube

"Buon viaggio (Share the Love)" is a song by Italian singer-songwriter Cesare Cremonini. It was released on 27 March 2015 through Universal Music Italy and Trecuori srl, as the lead single from his second live album Più che logico (Live).

== Composition ==
The song, written by Cremonini with Davide Petrella and Alessandr Magnanini, under the production of Walter Mameli. The singer explanined the meaning of the song:

"It is a positive, light but heavy song where the journey is not about going, finding the courage to take the road that leads more roads. The hardest songs to write are the seemingly most difficult, the most direct, the ones that complain about everything, don't sulk, but propose greyhound models."

== Critic reception ==
Mattia Marzi of Rockol described the song "characterized by a sense of levity and carefreeness", which "combines electronic elements with others more inclined toward folk music". Raffaella Oliva of IO Donna wrote that Cremonini "is as always good at writing light, airy songs" and "with that thread of melancholy", pointing out that "there's even a whistle here that's so summery: voila."

Cosmopolitan Italia defined the song as "a hymn to lightness" with a "cheerful spirit that inevitably catapults one into a summer mood". The magazine wrote that "behind its easygoing air and spirited lightness, Cesare Cremonini's signature song has the carat to be a lesson" of "the journey sung by Cremonini, then, is that of life and requires courage and enthusiasm, confidence and willpower, but it needs the right company to go through it".

== Music video ==
The music video for the song, directed by Gaetano Morbioli and filmed in Barcelona, Spain, was released on February 22, 2018, through the singer's YouTube channel.

== Charts ==
=== Weekly charts ===
Chart (2015)	Peak position
Italy (FIMI)	6
Italy Airplay (EarOne)	2

=== Year-end charts ===
Chart (2015)	Position
Italy (FIMI)	24

== Certifications ==
Certifications for "Buon viaggio (Share the Love)"
Region	Certification	Certified units/sales
Italy (FIMI)	4× Platinum	200,000^{‡}
^{‡} Sales+streaming figures based on certification alone.
