= Il comico (Sai che risate) =

Single by Cesare Cremonini

from the album La teoria dei colori
- Released: 20 April 2012
- Genre: Pop
- Length: 4:17
- Label: Universal; Trecuori srl
- Songwriters: Alessandro Magnanini; Cesare Cremonini
- Producers: Magnanini; Cremonini

Cesare Cremonini singles chronology
"Hello!" (2010)	"Il comico (Sai che risate)" (2012)	"Una come te" (2012)

Music video
- "Il Comico (Sai Che Risate)" on YouTube

"Il comico (Sai che risate)" is a song by Italian singer-songwriter Cesare Cremonini. It was released on 20 April 2012 through Universal Music Italy and Trecuori srl, as the second single from his fourth studio album La teoria dei colori.

== Composition ==
The song was written and produced by Cremonini himself with Alessandro Magnanini. In an interview with Rockol Cremonini explained the meaning of the song

"It is an autobiographical song, the whole record is. Looking inside yourself is not a due act. If you do it, it is to share it with someone. If you look for that thing that is yours, personal, you have to look for that thing that can be universal, that applies to others. That's when the song becomes unity among people, magic for everyone, a chorus in a stadium."

== Charts ==
=== Weekly charts ===
Chart (2012)	Peak position
Italy (FIMI)	13
Italy Airplay (EarOne)	1

=== Year-end charts ===
Chart (2012)	Position
Italy (FIMI)	38
Italy Airplay (EarOne)	2

== Certifications ==
Certifications for "Il comico (Sai che risate)"
Region	Certification	Certified units/sales
Italy (FIMI)	Platinum	30,000^{*}
^{*} Sales figures based on certification alone.
