= Luca Carboni =

Italian singer-songwriter

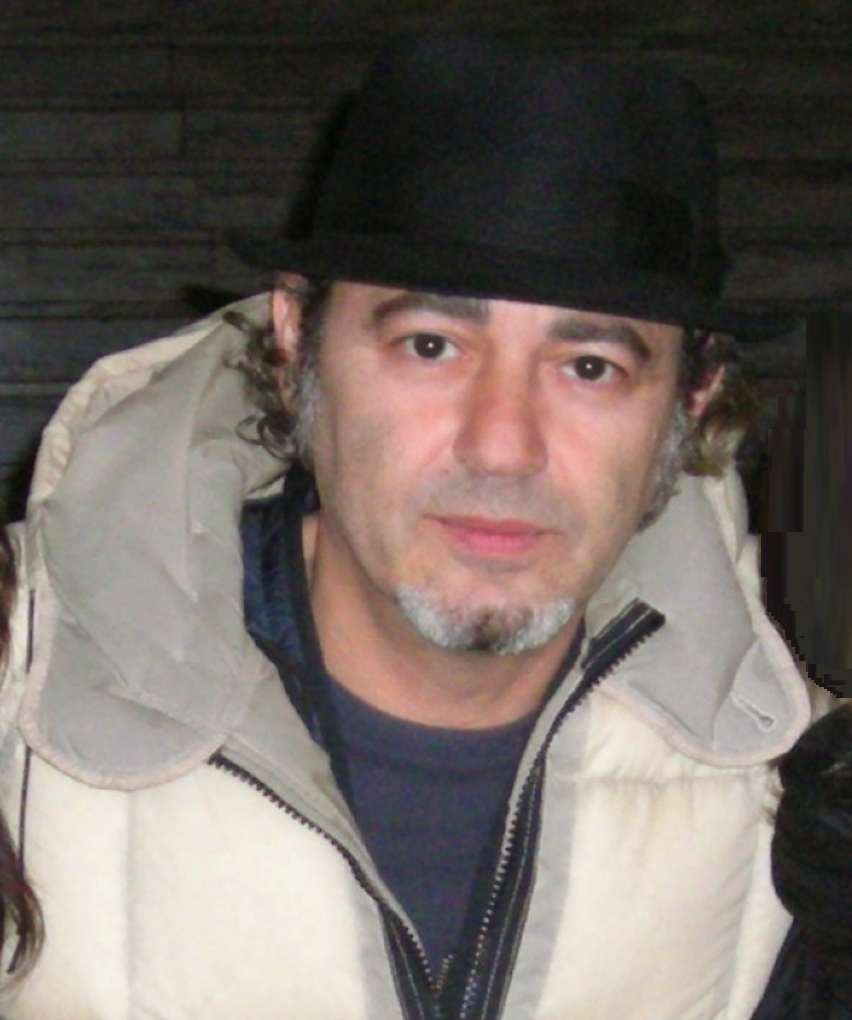
- Carboni in 2009
- Born: 12 October 1962 (age 63); Bologna, Italy
- Occupation: Singer-songwriter

Luca Carboni (born 12 October 1962) is an Italian singer-songwriter. He debuted in 1981 as a guitarist in the band Teobaldi Rock, publishing his first solo album in 1984. He is also a painter and carpenter.

== Career ==
In 1976, at the age of 14, Carboni founded the band Teobaldi Rock, with the role of guitarist and songwriter. In 1980, the band took part in the Bologna Rock 80 festival; the following year they released the first and only single, "L.N."/"Odore d'inverno".

Carboni's turning point was when the band Stadio read his lyrics and asked him a song for their first album. The song was titled "Navigando controvento" and appeared in the album Stadio (1982). The band's leader, Gaetano Curreri, helped him in realizing his first album, published in January 1984 and it was titled ...intanto Dustin Hoffman non sbaglia un film: it was co-produced by Curreri and included collaborations with Ron and Lucio Dalla. The album sold 30,000 copies and the single "Ci stiamo sbagliando" more than 50,000, establishing Carboni in the Italian music panorama. In that year he won Young Artists competition at the Festivalbar.

In 1985, he released Forever, which sold 70,000 copies and entered the Italian Top Ten for some weeks. In 1987, he released the album Luca Carboni, which contains one of his most popular songs, "Silvia lo sai", a story of adolescence and drug. This song and the other hit "Farfallina" led the album to sell up to 700,000 copies, reaching the top of the Italian charts. The same album was reissued in Spanish in 1989 and was followed by two tours. In 1989 he released the album Persone silenziose launched by the single "Primavera".

Carboni's most successful album was Carboni, released in January 1992, containing the pop hits "Ci vuole un fisico bestiale", "La mia città" and "Mare mare", which won the Festivalbar in the following summer. Carboni sold more than a million copies and was followed, as common for Carboni, by a summer tour, although this time on a European scale; he also sang in eight concerts with Jovanotti.

In the 1990s, Carboni moved to a more personal and minimalistic inspiration, as showed by the voluntarily raw-produced MONDO world welt monde (1995) and by Carovana (1998). He spent the following two years on tours, including some stages abroad.

His following albums were Il tempo dell'amore (1999, a collection with two new songs), LU*CA (2001) and ...le band si sciolgono (2006), which includes collaborations with Gaetano Curreri, Pino Daniele and Tiziano Ferro. In January 2009 he released Musiche ribelli, a collection of 1970s and 1980s cover songs by Italian singer-songwriters such as Eugenio Finardi, Enzo Jannacci, Francesco De Gregori, Edoardo Bennato and Pierangelo Bertoli.

On 1 October 2013, to celebrate his 30-year career it was released the album Fisico & Politico containing 3 unreleased tracks and 9 hits in duet with Tiziano Ferro, Elisa, Chris Brown, Alice, Miguel Bosé, Franco Battiato, Biagio Antonacci, Cesare Cremonini and Samuele Bersani. The first single from the album was "Fisico e Politico", a duet with Fabri Fibra, while the other new songs were "C'è sempre una canzone" written by Luciano Ligabue and "Dimentica". In 2015 he released his album Pop-up, anticipated by a successful single, "Luca lo stesso". In 2018, he released the album Sputnik, with the song "Una grande festa" as its lead single.

On 7 February 2020, Marco Masini's album Masini +1 30th Anniversary was released, containing the song Vaffanculo in duet with Carboni. On 3 April, the single Canzone sbagliata by rapper Danti featuring a duet with Shade and Luca Carboni is released. On 8 May 2020, the single Ma il cielo è sempre più blu (Italian Stars 4 Life, a cover of Rino Gaetano's 1975 song Ma il cielo è sempre più blu, was released as a digital download, featuring Luca Carboni in a choral collaboration (recorded remotely) with fifty-four of the most popular Italian singers and musicians. The song was made to support the Italian Red Cross during the COVID-19 emergency. On 10 July 2020, La canzone dell'estate, written by him during the quarantine, was released. In 2024 he collaborated on Cesare Cremonini's eighth studio album Alaska Baby on the song "San Luca", becoming his first song since his cancer diagnose.

=== Personal life ===
In 2011, in an interview, Carboni described himself as a practising Catholic. He regularly attends the Mass. In 2022, he was diagnosed with lung cancer; after a maintenance chemotherapy treatment and a surgical procedure, he declared in 2024 that the cancer was in remission.

== Discography ==
Studio albums

- 1984 – ...intanto Dustin Hoffman non sbaglia un film
- 1985 – Forever
- 1987 – Luca Carboni
- 1989 – Persone silenziose
- 1992 – Carboni
- 1995 – Mondo world welt monde
- 1998 – Carovana
- 2001 – Luca
- 2006 – ...le band si sciolgono
- 2011 – Senza titolo
- 2015 – Pop-up
- 2018 – Sputnik

Greatest hits albums

- 1993 – Diario Carboni
- 1999 – Il tempo dell'amore
- 2007 – Una rosa per te
- 2013 – Fisico & politico

Live albums

- 2003 – Live

Cover albums

- 2009 - Musiche ribelli
