= Ora che non ho più te =

Single by Cesare Cremonini

from the album Alaska Baby
- Released: 24 September 2024
- Recorded: 2024
- Studio: Mille Galassie Studio, Bologna, Italy
- Genre: Pop
- Length: 5:03
- Label: Universal; EMI
- Songwriters: Cesare Cremonini; Davide Petrella
- Producers: Cremonini; Alessio Natalizia; Alessandro De Crescenzo

Cesare Cremonini singles chronology
| "Fantasie" (2023) | "Ora che non ho più te" (2024) | "San Luca" (2024) |

Music video
- "Ora che non ho più te" on YouTube

"Ora che non ho più te" is a song by Italian singer-songwriter Cesare Cremonini. It was released on 24 September 2024 through Universal Music Italy and EMI Records, as the lead single from his eighth studio album, Alaska Baby.

The song peaked at number one on Italian Singles Chart, becoming Cremonini's first number one as a solo artist and his first top-ten placement since "Poetica" in 2017.

== Background and composition ==
Following the publication of his seventh studio album, La ragazza del futuro (2022), Cremonini took a two-year recording break, collaborating only on the song "Fantasie" by singer-songwriter Tropico.

The song was written by the singer-songwriter himself with Tropico and produced with Alessio Natalizia and Alessandro De Crescenzo. Cremonini explained the meaning of the song and its composition proces:

"It is a real song. I chose it as an opener because it was a turning point from a music production point of view and a page-turner in my life. It's not a memory that I want to come back to, it's an experience that has to become a biography, becoming free again. I think it is important to let go of things the moment you are allowed to, there is no point in ending a relationship, a friendship, a working relationship, any piece of your life, before it is due, before it is time. There is a past in the song, there is a finished love, but there is also a new life to face for me and those who were with me. There has been nothing more true for me. You don't need metaphors, when you can't rest anymore, when you can't sleep. Then the new music coming out dresses you up again, everything suddenly changes. You are master, for a few seconds, of your destiny. "Ora che non ho più te" is the curtain that opens on a project made up of many sets that I will reveal song by song. In this song there is all the desire to return to speak a more real language, of the things I live, without hiding. I am attached to life: working, traveling, knowing, throwing myself into experiences. Even the musical choices reflect this attitude, it is a song that wants to make you sing, scream, dance with your feet on the ground."

== Critical reception ==
Gianni Sibilla of Rockol stated that the song introduces new sounds for the singer composed of "retro sounds of the song, with filtered drums reminiscent of 80s Prince" while the melody turns out to be "typically Cremonini-esque", in which he sets a lyric that features "phrasing in the stanzas reminiscent of the classic Venditti; [...] remaining strongly himself, with his own unique poetics". Alessandro Alicandri of TV Sorrisi e Canzoni also found '80s music sonorities, in which the length of the song shows that the singer "imagined an opposite, narrative and dreamlike path, a headlamp trip into the unknown" and describing it as "a night song that takes its time to tell the end of a love, whatever its nature".

== Music video ==
The music video for the song, directed by Enea Colombi, was released on 24 September 2024 through the singer's YouTube channel. It was filmed in Friuli-Venezia Giulia.

== Commercial performances ==
The song debuted at number 59 on the Italian Singles Chart; it peaked at number three in its fifth week of release, becoming Cremonini's twelfth top-ten as a solo artist and his first since "Poetica" in 2017.

== Charts ==
=== Weekly charts ===
Weekly chart performance for "Ora che non ho più te"
| Chart (2024) | Peak position |
|---|---|
| Italy (FIMI) | 1 |
| Italy Airplay (EarOne) | 1 |

=== Year-end charts ===
2024 year-end chart performance for "Ora che non ho più te"
| Chart (2024) | Position |
|---|---|
| Italy (FIMI) | 54 |

2025 year-end chart performance for "Ora che non ho più te"
| Chart (2025) | Position |
|---|---|
| Italy (FIMI) | 4 |

== Certifications ==
Certifications for Ora che non ho più te
| Region | Certification | Certified units/sales |
|---|---|---|
| Italy (FIMI) | 3× Platinum | 600,000^{‡} |
^{‡} Sales+streaming figures based on certification alone.
