= Marmellata n. 25 =

"Marmellata #25"

Single by Cesare Cremonini

from the album Maggese
- Language: Italian
- Released: 16 May 2005
- Recorded: 2005
- Genre: Pop
- Length: 4:42
- Label: Warner Music
- Songwriter: Cesare Cremonini
- Producer: Walter Mameli

Cesare Cremonini singles chronology
"Gongi-Boy" (2003)	"Marmellata #25" (2005)	"Maggese" (2005)

Music video
- "Marmellata #25" on YouTube

"Marmellata #25" is a song by Cesare Cremonini. It was released on 16 May 2005 through Warner Music Italia, as the llead single from his second studio album Maggese.

== Composition ==
The title makes reference to a passage from the lyrics in which the singer, having been left by his girlfriend, gets rid of woes by eating "kilos of jam", exactly the same one that the girl had hid from him. The jam represents happiness while #25 is the age of Cremonini at the moment of the release of the track. Throughout the song, in addition to his dejection due to the end of his relationship, Cremonini also makes a reference to his sadness due to his nostalgia for former Italian footballer Roberto Baggio, and late Formula 1 racing driver Ayrton Senna.

An alternate version of the track, "Marmellata #24", was issued as a B-side on the subsequent single "Maggese".

== Release ==
The single of the song was released in store on 16 May 2005, almost a month ahead of the full album Maggese. The single entered the charts at number 18. The song would remain on the charts for about three months, reaching number 9 at its peak.

== Music video ==
Filmed in 35 mm by Gaetano Morbioli for Run Multimedia, the video of "Marmellata #25" sees the singer awake one morning to find that all the objects of his apartment had come to life. When Cremonini leaves the apartment and thinks himself to be free, he finds himself face to face with a giant spider (formed by the objects of his home) that follow him on the streets of Bologna, until arriving at the Giardini Margherita, where Cremonini bangs his head against a branch and passes out. Upon reawakening the singer finds himself once again in his own bed and once he gets up everything is perfectly normal, while in the kitchen he finds his girlfriend who gives him a good morning kiss. The apartment in which the video was filmed was the true home of Cremonini.

Another video was produced, available on the official site of Cremonini, of "Marmellata #24", an alternate version of "Marmellata #25". In this video, completed with some images that were discarded from the original video, appears also Ballo, who did not appear in the original version.

== Track listing ==
1. "Marmellata #25"
2. "Marmellata #25" (Quiet)
3. "Marmellata #25" (Smooth)

== Charts ==
Chart (2005)	Peak position
Italy (FIMI)	11

== Certifications ==
Certifications for "Marmellata n. 25"
Region	Certification	Certified units/sales
Italy (FIMI) Since 2009	2× Platinum	100,000^{‡}
^{‡} Sales+streaming figures based on certification alone.
