= Lùnapop =

Italian pop band (1999–2001)

- Origin: Bologna, Italy
- Genre: Pop rock
- Years active: 1999–2001
- Members: Cesare Cremonini; Nicola Balestri; Gabriele Galassi; Alessandro de Simone; Michele Giuliani

Lùnapop was an Italian pop rock music group active between 1999 and 2001.

Lùnapop released its lone full-length Italian language album, ...Squérez?, in 1999. The album quickly became a commercial success, with the single "50 special", hitting the number one spot in the Italian charts in 1999, and ...Squérez? being the third-best selling album in Italy in 2000. The band won awards as Italy's best band, best album, and best newcomer in 2000.

Lùnapop was also nominated for a 2000 MTV Europe Music Awards, and won the 2000 Festivalbar award with their single "Qualcosa di grande".

== Break up ==
Lùnapop split up in 2001. Lead singer Cesare Cremonini pursued a successful solo career. His Lùnapop bandmate, Nicola 'Ballo' Balestri, joined him in his new band, along with other musicians. Since going solo, Cremonini has released six solo studio albums: Bagus, Maggese, Il primo bacio sulla Luna, La teoria dei colori, Logico, and Possibili scenari. Solo hits include "Vieni a vedere perché", "Latin Lover", "Gongi-Boy", "Marmellata #25", "Dicono di me" and "Figlio di un re". Alessandro De Simone, Gabriele Galassi and Andrea Capoti formed the band Liberpool in 2008. Their first single, "Sotto i portici", was released in 2009 and was followed by an album called LP. Michele Giuliani retired from the music industry.

== Members ==
- Cesare Cremonini (born in Bologna, 27 March 1980) – vocals and piano
- Andrea Capoti (Gallipoli, 3 July 1980) – percussion
- Michele Giuliani (Bologna, 14 August 1980) – electric guitar
- Alessandro de Simone (Bologna, 19 October 1980) – drums
- Gabriele Galassi (Bologna, 27 January 1981) – acoustic guitar
- Nicola "Ballo" Balestri (Bologna, 20 June 1981) – bass guitar

== Discography ==
=== Albums ===
- 1999: ...Squérez?

=== Singles ===
- 1999: "50 special"
- 2000: "Un giorno migliore"
- 2000: "Qualcosa di grande"
- 2000: "Se ci sarai"
- 2001: "Resta con me"
- 2001: "Vorrei"
