= San Luca (song) =

Single by Cesare Cremonini and Luca Carboni

from the album Alaska Baby
- Released: 6 December 2024
- Recorded: 2024
- Studio: Mille Galassie Studio, Bologna, Italy
- Genre: Pop
- Length: 5:33
- Label: Universal; EMI
- Songwriters: Cesare Cremonini; Davide Petrella
- Producers: Cremonini; Alessandro Magnanini

Cesare Cremonini and Luca Carboni singles chronology
"Ora che non ho più te" (2024)	"San Luca" (2024)	"Nonostante tutto" (2025)

Luca Carboni singles chronology
"La canzone dell'estate" (2020)	"San Luca" (2024)

Music video
- "San Luca" on YouTube

"San Luca" is a song recorded by Italian singers Cesare Cremonini and Luca Carboni. It was released on December 6, 2024, through Epic Records and Universal Music Italy as the second single from Cremonini's eighth studio album, Alaska Baby.

== Background and release ==
The song, written by Cremonini with Tropico, featured the vocal collaboration of Luca Carboni, marking the latter's return to the music scene after he was diagnosed with pulmonary cancer. The song's title is dedicated to the Sanctuary of the Madonna of San Luca in Bologna, the hometown of both artists. In an interview, Cremonini explained the meaning of the song and the choice to collaborate with Carboni:

""San Luca"s is a prayer and when it was born I kept it in the drawer for a long time trying to understand who it was addressed to. It spoke of reflections on the soul and the future. Like the basilica, like Our Lady of St Luke, I consider this song a little bit religious and a little bit secular. It speaks the hymn language of our feelings. When Luca heard it, he was coming from a complex, particular period and we experienced moments of great emotion singing it together. His is a legendary voice: I believe that beyond faces, vocal timbres and the naturalness with which one moves in the world count. Luca has a deep gaze, an inimitable voice and an elegant and delicate way of moving through the world. His approach to things raised the song to a higher level: I built the road, the cobblestones to walk on, but I stepped back a little. It is not just a dedication to Bologna, this one, but to faith in man, when believing that miracles can happen every day. Whenever it happens in a song, it makes it special and unique."

== Charts ==
Chart performance for "San Luca"
Chart (2024)	Peak position
Italy (FIMI)	28
Italy (EarOne Airplay)	21

== Certifications ==
Certifications for "San Luca"
Region	Certification	Certified units/sales
Italy (FIMI)	Gold	100,000^{‡}
^{‡} Sales+streaming figures based on certification alone.
