= Hello! (Cesare Cremonini and Malika Ayane song) =

Single by Cesare Cremonini and Malika Ayane

from the album 1999–2010 The Greatest Hits
- Released: 1 October 2010
- Studio: Mille Galassie Studio, Bologna, Italy
- Genre: Pop rock
- Length: 4:05
- Label: Warner
- Songwriters: Cesare Cremonini; Malika Ayane
- Producer: Walter Mameli

Cesare Cremonini and Malika Ayane singles chronology
"Mondo" (2010)	"Hello!" (2010)	"Il comico (Sai che risate)" (2012)

Malika Ayane singles chronology
"Satisfy My Soul" (2010)	"Hello!" (2010)	"Thoughts and Clouds" (2010)

"Hello!" is a song by Italian singer-songwriters Cesare Cremonini and Malika Ayane. It was released on 1 October 2010 through Warner Music Italy, as the lead single from Cremonini first greatest hits album 1999–2010 The Greatest Hits.

== Composition ==
The song was the first artistic collaboration between Cremoni and Ayane, who were in a relationship at the time. The orchestral arrangements by the London Session Orchestra conducted by Nick Ingman. It has achieved good radio success. In an interview with Rockol Cremonini explained the meaning of thes song and the decision to collaborate with Ayane:

"Malika asked me for a song for her album, so I wrote her "Believe in love" which went into Grovigli. It then happens that whenever you do collaborations a give-and-take relationship arises, and 'Hello' kind of completes our artistic encounter. Malika has an extraordinary voice, she has a voice that opens the clouds and has an extraordinary effect on human beings: put into one of my songs is an extraordinary gift."

== Charts ==
=== Weekly charts ===
Chart (2010)	Peak position
Italy (FIMI)	7
Italy Airplay (EarOne)	3

=== Year-end charts ===
Chart (2010)	Position
Italy (FIMI)	81
Italy Airplay (EarOne)	62

== Certifications ==
Certifications for "Hello!"
Region	Certification	Certified units/sales
Italy (FIMI)	Gold	15,000^{*}
^{*} Sales figures based on certification alone.
