= Kiss Me Again (2010 film) =

- Film poster
- Italian: Baciami ancora
- Directed by: Gabriele Muccino
- Screenplay by: Gabriele Muccino; Sandro Petraglia; Stefano Rulli
- Story by: Gabriele Muccino
- Produced by: Domenico Procacci
- Starring: Stefano Accorsi; Vittoria Puccini
- Cinematography: Arnaldo Catinari
- Edited by: Claudio Di Mauro
- Music by: Paolo Buonvino
- Production companies: Medusa Film; Fandango; Mediaset Premium; Radio Dimensione Suono
- Distributed by: Medusa Film
- Release date: 29 January 2010 (Italy)
- Running time: 139 minutes
- Country: Italy
- Language: Italian

Kiss Me Again (Italian: Baciami ancora, pronounced [ˈbaːtʃami aŋˈkoːra, -mj -]) is a 2010 Italian film written and directed by Gabriele Muccino.

The film, a sequel to The Last Kiss, was released in theaters on 29 January 2010.

== Plot ==
The story takes place in Rome, ten years after the first episode, and chronicles the development of the story told in The Last Kiss: Carlo and Giulia are about to conclude their divorce, and she, having the custody of their child, has been living with a man named Simon for three years while Carlo has an affair with the twenty-five year old Anna. Paul, depressed and addicted to tranquillizers, began a relationship with Livia the wife of Hadrian, returning after serving a long sentence for attempting to import a shipment of cocaine from Colombia. Marco, apparently happily married to Veronica, actually conceals a deep crisis aggravated by the expectation of a child. Alberto, who returned from the collegiate trip with friends at the end of the first film, still wanted to get away from all that is crushing them. This situation is likely to explode for all. Carlo, despite the constant mutual betrayal, never forgot Giulia.

A moment of passion will result in a new pregnancy and Anna, recognizing that the two are still in love, steps aside. Marco, irritated by the constant nights out with her girlfriends Veronica while he gets late at the office, asks her to be honest with him and not to betray him. The woman, however, starts an affair with the young artist Lorenzo. Mark, desperate and faced with the decision of Veronica to leave, is restrained by his friends from making a blunder and begins to wonder where he might have been wrong: he agrees to return and submit to the checks on his fertility which had been shown to be infertile before. Veronica discovers that she is pregnant by Lorenzo, but faced with the reaction of the immature young man who does not want to be tied down, she returns to Marco in tears asking him to forgive her. The two will welcome the child as the son who they could not have together. Since Adriano did not have a job, Carlo let him take over his shop. Later, Paul, who fell into a crisis with no way out, plays Russian roulette with the gun of his father until he loses and is shot tragically. All his friends gather at the morgue. The film ends with the image of Alberto, broken down as he had planned, arriving in Brazil in his pocket just €2,300.00 and smiles in front of the falls.

== Cast ==
- Stefano Accorsi as Carlo
- Vittoria Puccini as Giulia
- Pierfrancesco Favino as Marco
- Claudio Santamaria as Paolo
- Giorgio Pasotti as Adriano
- Marco Cocci as Alberto
- Sabrina Impacciatore as Livia
- Daniela Piazza as Veronica
- Adriano Giannini as Simone
- Primo Reggiani as Lorenzo
- Valeria Bruni Tedeschi as Adele

== Production ==
The shooting of the film began on Friday 26 June 2009 in Rome, and ended on Wednesday 30 September 2009. Domenico Procacci, producer of the 2001 film, confirmed the presence of most of the cast of the first film (except for the role of Julia, for which Vittoria Puccini took the place of Giovanna Mezzogiorno): Stefano Accorsi, Claudio Santamaria, Sabrina Impacciatore, Pierfrancesco Field bean, Daniela Piazza, Marco Cocci and Giorgio Pasotti. He added that four new entries: Valeria Bruni Tedeschi, Adriano Giannini, Francesca Valtorta and Primo Reggiani. The role of Swabian is played by Sara Girolami.

Giovanna Mezzogiorno refused to play again the role of Julia. This rejection made Muccino angry. He said "Giovanna you can score on the agenda that will no longer work with me", while they were starting the shoot.

== Soundtrack ==
The original score featured songs from Mina, Ornella Vanoni, Doris Day and The Zombies. Jovanotti co-wrote with Saturinino Celani and RIccardo Onori, with the music production of Michele Canova, the original song "Baciami ancora".

== Reception ==
=== Box office ===
In its opening weekend the film grossed €3,119,351. In total it grossed over €9 million.
