= Malika Ayane =

Italian pop singer (born 1984)

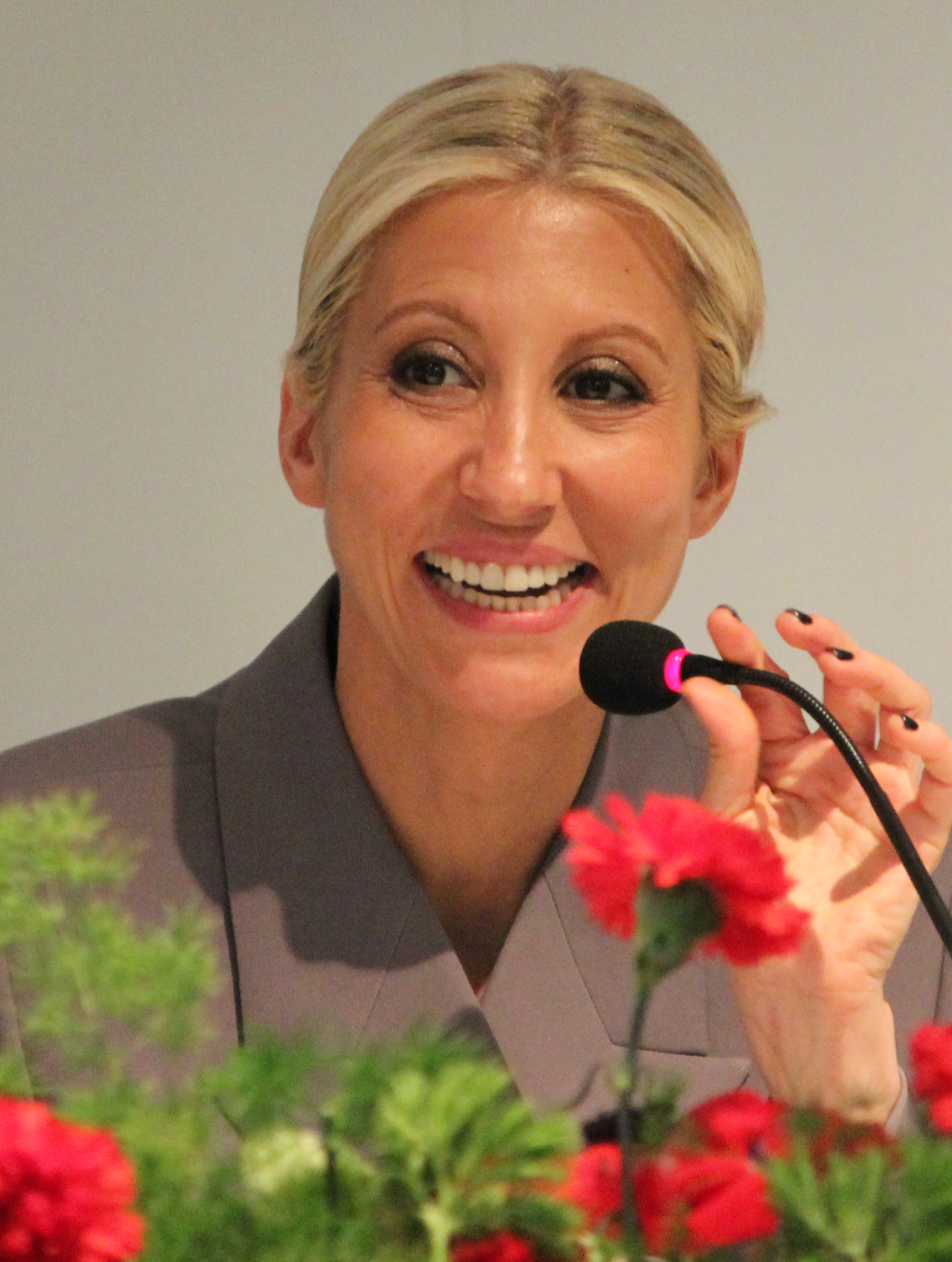
- Malika Ayane at the Sanremo Music Festival 2026

Background information
- Born: 31 January 1984 (age 42); Milan, Italy
- Origin: Milan, Italy
- Genres: Pop; R&B; jazz
- Occupations: Singer; songwriter; actress
- Years active: 2007–present
- Labels: Sugar Music; Warner Music
- Website: www.malikaayane.com

Malika Ayane (Italian pronunciation: [maˈliːka aˈjan]; born 31 January 1984) is an Italian singer, songwriter, and actress.

== Early life ==
Malika Ayane was born in Milan, Italy, on 31 January 1984, to a Moroccan father, Ahmed, and an Italian mother. She grew up in the Zone 2 of Milan, the most multi-ethnic area of the city. In 1995, she entered the White Voices Choir at the Teatro alla Scala in her hometown, where she sang for seven years. In the meanwhile, she started studying cello at the "Giuseppe Verdi" Conservatory in Milan, where she graduated in 2001.

== Career ==
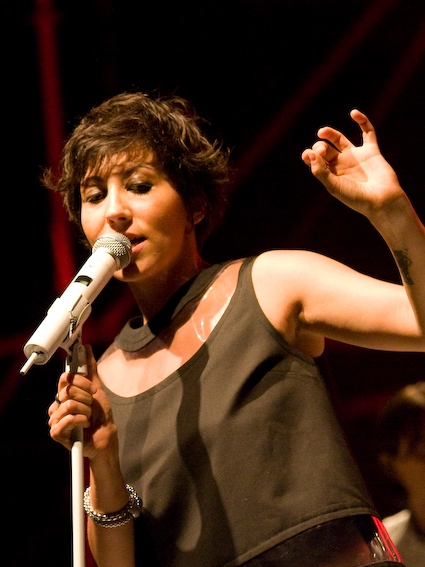
Malika Ayane performing in Villa Solaria at Sesto Fiorentino, Italy in 2009

During the mid-2000s, Ayane recorded songs for some TV spots, including a cover of "Over the Rainbow" for the campaign of Italian food company Yomo in 2005, and the original track "Soul Waver", performed in 2007 for Swedish car manufacturer Saab.

In 2007, Ayane met Italian record producer and former singer Caterina Caselli, which granted her a deal with independent label Sugar Music. As a result, "Soul Waver" was released as her debut single. The song was also re-released in an Italian-language version, "Sospesa", with singer-songwriter Pacifico. "Sospesa" will also feature in the movie Letters to Juliet, released in 2010. Malika Ayane's self-titled first studio album was released on 26 September 2008. The album also spawned the single "Feeling Better", which became a radio hit in 2008, while the track "Il giardino dei salici" was chosen by Barilla for a TV commercial.

In December 2008, Ayane was chosen as one of the contestants of the Newcomers' section of the 59th Sanremo Music Festival. During the show, held in February 2009, she performed her entry "Come foglie", written by Negramaro's frontman Giuliano Sangiorgi. During the third night of the show, the song was also performed as a duet with singer-songwriter Gino Paoli.

For Valerio Scanu, contestant of the eighth season of the talent show "Amici di Maria De Filippi", she wrote the song "Dopo Di Me" that reached the ninth position in the Italian charts.

Malika, in April 2009, took part in the song "Domani 21-04-09" with other Italian singers to fund raise to rebuild schools in Abruzzo, the region where the disastrous earthquake centred in L'Aquila and surrounding villages struck on 6 April. In 2010, she was a contestant in the 60th edition of the Sanremo Music Festival where she won the "Mia Martini" critics award for her song "Ricomincio da qui". In 2010 she collaborated with her then-fiancé Cesare Cremonini on "Hello!".

On 30 November 2025, she was announced among the participants of the Sanremo Music Festival 2026. She competed with the song "Animali notturni".

== Discography ==
=== Albums ===
List of albums, with chart positions and certifications
Title	Album details	Chart positions	Certifications
Title	Album details	ITA	Certifications
Malika Ayane	Released: 26 September 2008; Label: Sugar; Formats: CD, download	9	FIMI: Platinum
Grovigli	Released: 19 February 2010; Label: Sugar; Formats: CD, download	2	FIMI: 2× Platinum
Ricreazione	Released: 18 September 2012; Label: Sugar; Formats: CD, download	2	FIMI: Platinum
Naïf	Released: 12 February 2015; Label: Sugar; Formats: CD, download	9	FIMI: Platinum
Domino	Released: 21 September 2018; Label: Sugar; Formats: CD, download	10	
Malifesto	Released: 26 March 2021; Label: Sugar; Formats: CD, download	9	
Cicale	Released: 18 September 2026; Label: Carosello; Formats: CD, download	74	

=== Singles ===
Title	Year	Chart positions	Certifications	Album
Title	Year	ITA	Certifications	Album
"Soul Waver" / "Sospesa" (feat. Pacifico)	2008	—		Malika Ayane
"Feeling Better"	2008	6		Malika Ayane
"Come foglie"	2009	2	FIMI: Platinum	Malika Ayane
"Contro vento"	2009	—		Malika Ayane
"La prima cosa bella"	2010	5	FIMI: Platinum	Grovigli
"Ricomincio da qui"	2010	2	FIMI: Platinum	Grovigli
"Satisfy My Soul"	2010	—		Grovigli
"Thoughts and Clouds"	2010	—		Grovigli
"Il giorno in più"	2011	—		Grovigli
"Tre cose"	2012	13	FIMI: Platinum	Ricreazione
"Il tempo non inganna"	2012	—		Ricreazione
"E se poi"	2013	8	FIMI: Platinum	Ricreazione
"Niente"	2013	39		Ricreazione
"Cosa hai messo nel caffè?"	2013	—		Ricreazione
"Neve casomai (Un amore straordinario)"	2013	—		Ricreazione
"Adesso e qui (nostalgico presente)"	2015	9	FIMI: Gold	Naïf
"Senza fare sul serio"	2015	10	FIMI: 3× Platinum	Naïf
"Tempesta"	2015	74	FIMI: Gold	Naïf
"Animali notturni"	2026	25		TBA
"—" denotes singles that did not chart

==== Featured singles ====
Title	Year	Chart positions	Certifications	Album
Title	Year	ITA	Certifications	Album
"Domani 21/04.09" (Artisti Uniti per l'Abruzzo)	2009	1	FIMI: 2× Platinum	Charity single
"Verrà l'estate" (Pacifico feat. Malika Ayane)	2009	—		Dentro ogni casa
"Hello!" (Cesare Cremonini feat. Malika Ayane)	2010	7	FIMI: Gold	1999-2010 The Greatest Hits
"L'unica cosa che resta" (Pacifico feat. Malika Ayane)	2012	—		Una voce non basta
"—" denotes singles that did not chart

=== Other appearances ===
List of non-single guest appearances, showing year released and album name
Song	Year	Album
"Blue Christmas" (Andrea Bocelli feat. Malika Ayane)	2009	My Christmas
"Ragazza del '95" (Francesco De Gregori feat. Malika Ayane)	2012	Sulla strada
"Omero al Cantagiro" (Francesco De Gregori feat. Malika Ayane)	2012	Sulla strada
"Quella giusta per te" (Stylophonic feat. Malika Ayane & Dargen D'Amico)	2013	Boom!
"La ladra" (Marta sui Tubi feat. Malik Ayane)	2014	Salva gente
"Sirene" (Fedez feat. Malika Ayane)	2014	Pop-Hoolista
"La prima cosa bella" (Luca Barbarossa feat. Malika Ayane)	2015	Radio DUEts – Musica libera
"Anima" (Ron feat. Malika Ayane)	2016	La forza di dire sì
"Buena fortuna" (Raphael Gualazzi feat. Malika Ayane)	2016	Love Life Peace
"Noi" (Boosta feat. Malika Ayane)	2016	La stanza intelligente
"Pollyanna" (Cristina D'Avena featuring Malika Ayane)	2018	Duets Forever

=== Music videos ===
List of music videos, showing year released and director
Title	Year	Director(s)
"Sospesa" (with Pacifico)	2008	Paolo Rambaldi, Roberto Battaglia
"Feeling Better"	2008	Marco Gentile
"Come foglie"	2009	Federico Brugia
"Contro vento"	2009	Federico Brugia
"Domani 21/04.09" (Artisti Uniti per l'Abruzzo)	2009	Ambrogio Lo Giudice
"Verrà l'estate" (with Pacifico)	2009	—N/a
"La prima cosa bella"	2010	Simone Manetti
"Ricomincio da qui"	2010	Federico Brugia
"Satisfy My Soul"	2010	—N/a
"Thoughts and Clouds"	2010	Federico Brugia
"Il giorno in più"	2011	Federico Brugia
"Tre cose"	2012	Federico Brugia
"Il tempo non inganna"	2012	Federico Brugia
"E se poi"	2013	Federico Brugia
"Niente"	2013	Federico Brugia
"Cosa hai messo nel caffè?"	2013	Federico Brugia

== Acting credits ==
=== Film ===
Year	Title	Role(s)	Notes
2012	Tutti i rumori del mare	Woman With Gun	
2014	Caserta Palace Dream	Singer at Party	Short film
2015	Lava	Lele	Italian dub; voice role
2023	Rido perché ti amo	French Saleswoman	Uncredited
2025	Siblings	Herself	Cameo appearance

=== Television ===
Year	Title	Role(s)	Notes
2019	X Factor	Herself (judge)	Season 13
2022	La Compagnia del Cigno	Etnomusicology Teacher	Special guest appearance (season 2)

=== Stage ===
Year	Title	Role(s)	Venue
2016	Evita	Eva Perón	Italian tour
2022–2024	Cats	Grizabella	Italian tour
2025–2026	Brokeback Mountain	Balladeer	Italian tour

== Awards and nominations ==
Year	Award	Nomination	Work	Result
2010	TRL Awards	First Lady	Herself	Won
2010	Premio Videoclip Italiano	Best Video by a Female Artist	"Ricomincio da qui"	Nominated
2010	Premio Tenco	Best Interpreter	Grovigli	Nominated
2010	MTV Europe Music Awards	Best Italian Act	Herself	Nominated
2010	Premio Videoclip Roma	Special Award "Cinema Meets Music"	"La prima cosa bella"	Won
2011	TRL Awards	Best Look	Herself	Nominated
2011	TRL Awards	Italians Do It Better	Herself	Nominated
2012	Nastro d'Argento	Best Original Song	"Something Is Changing"	Nominated
2013	Nastro d'Argento	Best Original Song	"Grovigli"	Nominated
2013	Lunezia Award	Lunezia for Sanremo Award	"E se poi"	Won
