= Logico n. 1 =

"Logico #1"

Single by Cesare Cremonini

from the album Logico
- Released: 27 March 2014
- Studio: Mille Galassie Studio, Bologna, Italy
- Genre: Electropop; dance-pop
- Length: 4:44
- Label: Universal; Trecuori srl
- Songwriters: Cesare Cremonini; Davide Petrella
- Producer: Walter Mameli

Cesare Cremonini singles chronology
"I Love You" (2013)	"Logico #1" (2014)	"GreyGoose" (2014)

Music video
- "Logico #1" on YouTube

"Logico #1" is a song co-written and recorded by Italian singer-songwriter Cesare Cremonini. It was released on 27 March 2014 through Universal Music Italy and Trecuori srl, as the lead single from his fifth studio album Logico.

The song peaked at number four on the Italian singles chart and was certified triple platinum by FIMI.

== Composition ==
The song was written by Cremonini with Davide Petrella under the music production of Walter Mameli, with electropop and dance-pop sounds. In an interview for Agenzia Giornalistica Italia the singer explained the meaning of the song and its writing process:

"Logical is a word that has always meant a lot to me. My mother tells me that it was one of the first ones I stammered when I was a child, and actually I think I first heard it uttered by my father, a doctor, during visits I was occasionally allowed to attend. I wrote it on the piano but shortly afterwards I had recorded an audition, virtually identical to the final version you can hear now: same sounds and same words. It is the reflection of a man who opens up in a desperate search for an accomplice in this increasingly complex, messy and incomprehensible life. A life that resembles more like a sentence, if one does not want to face it alone. Mail text insists on the importance of the discovery of a " self-like," someone with whom to mirror oneself for better or worse, rather than on the now unreal utopia of the discovery of a true " soul mate."

== Charts ==
=== Weekly charts ===
Chart (2014)	Peak position
Italy (FIMI)	4
Italy Airplay (EarOne)	1

=== Year-end charts ===
Chart (2014)	Position
Italy (FIMI)	29
Italy Airplay (EarOne)	3

== Certifications ==
Certifications for "Logico #1"
Region	Certification	Certified units/sales
Italy (FIMI)	3× Platinum	300,000^{‡}
^{‡} Sales+streaming figures based on certification alone.
