= Possibili scenari =

Studio album by Cesare Cremonini
- Released: 24 November 2017
- Recorded: January 2016 – August 2017
- Studio: London (AIR Studios); Bologna (Mille Galassie Studio)
- Genre: Pop
- Length: 49:38
- Label: Universal Music Italy; Trecuori srl
- Producer: Walter Mameli; Cesare Cremonini

Cesare Cremonini chronology
Più che logico (live) (2015)	Possibili scenari (2017)	Cremonini 2C2C - The Best Of (2019)

Singles from Possibili scenari
- 1. "Poetica" Released: 3 November 2017; 2. "Nessuno vuole essere Robin" Released: 23 February 2018; 3. "Kashmir-Kashmir" Released: 18 May 2018; 4. "Possibili scenari" Released: 12 October 2018

Possibili scenari is the sixth studio album by Italian singer-songwriter Cesare Cremonini, released by Universal Music Italy and Trecuori on 24 November 2017.

The album was promoted by several singles, including "Poetica" and "Nessuno vuole essere Robin". It debuted at number one on the Italian Albums Chart, becoming Cremonini's second consecutive album to achieve the spot.

== Composition ==
The album featured ten tracks written by Cremonini and Davide Petrella, with the music production of longtime co-producer Walter Mameli.

== Promotion ==
=== Singles ===
The album was announced with the publication of the first single "Poetica" on 3 November 2017, which peaked at 2 on the Italian Top Singles FIMI chart and has been certified double platinum in Italy. The second official single was "Nessuno vuole essere Robin", followed by "Kashmir-Kashmir" released in May 2018. The final single was the title track "Possibili scenari", published on 12 October 2018.

=== Reissue ===
On 7 December 2018, the album was reissued in piano and voice edition, in which Cremonini arranged the original pieces for solo piano.

== Track listing ==
Standard edition track listing
No.	Title	Writer(s)	Producer(s)	Length
1.	"Possibili scenari"	Cesare Cremonini; Davide Petrella	Walter Mameli	5:11
2.	"Kashmir-kashmir"	Cremonini; Petrella	Cremonini; Mameli	4:09
3.	"Poetica"	Cremonini; Petrella	Mameli	4:53
4.	"Un uomo nuovo"	Cremonini; Petrella	Mameli	5:41
5.	"Nessuno vuole essere Robin"	Cremonini; Petrella	Mameli	4:44
6.	"Silent hill"	Cremonini; Petrella	Mameli	4:13
7.	"Il cielo era sereno"	Cremonini; Petrella	Mameli	4:33
8.	"La isla"	Cremonini; Petrella	Mameli	4:46
9.	"Al tuo matrimonio"	Cremonini; Petrella	Mameli	4:25
10.	"La macchina del tempo"	Cremonini; Petrella	Mameli	7:02
Total length:				49:38

== Charts ==
=== Weekly charts ===
Chart (2017)	Peak position
Italian Albums (FIMI)	1

=== Year-end charts ===
Chart (2019)	Position
Italian Albums (FIMI)	22
Chart (2020)	Position
Italian Albums (FIMI)	16

== Certifications ==
Certifications for "Possibili scenari"
Region	Certification	Certified units/sales
Italy (FIMI)	2× Platinum	100,000^{‡}
^{‡} Sales+streaming figures based on certification alone.
