= Logico (album) =

Studio album by Cesare Cremonini
- Released: 6 May 2014
- Studio: Bologna (Mille Galassie Studios)
- Genre: Pop
- Length: 42:04
- Label: Universal Music Italy; Trecuori srl
- Producer: Walter Mameli

Cesare Cremonini chronology
| La teoria dei colori (2012) | Logico (2014) | Più che logico (Live) (2015) |

Singles from Logico
- 1. "Logico #1" Released: 27 March 2014; 2. "GreyGoose" Released: 29 August 2014; 3. "Io e Anna" Released: 9 January 2015

Logico is the fifth solo studio album by Italian singer-songwriter Cesare Cremonini, released on May 6, 2014 by Trecuori and distributed by Universal Music.

The album debuted at the top of the Italian Albums Chart, becoming his first album to achieve it.

On November 27, 2015, a limited edition box was named Logico Project Limited Edition containing both the Logic CD and the 3 live album More than logical (Live).

== Track listing ==
Standard edition track listing
| No. | Title | Writer(s) | Producer(s) | Length |
|---|---|---|---|---|
| 1. | "Intro blu" | Alessandro Magnanini | Walter Mameli | 0:34 |
| 2. | "Logico #1" | Cesare Cremonini; Davide Petrella | Walter Mameli | 4:41 |
| 3. | "GreyGoose" | Cremonini; Petrella | Mameli | 3:38 |
| 4. | "Io e Anna" | Cremonini; Petrella | Mameli | 4:10 |
| 5. | "John Wayne" | Cremonini; Petrella | Mameli | 3:38 |
| 6. | "Fare e disfare" | Cremonini; Magnanini | Mameli | 5:22 |
| 7. | "Vent'anni per sempre" | Cremonini; Petrella | Mameli | 2:47 |
| 8. | "Quando sarò milionario" | Cremonini | | 4:46 |
| 9. | "Se c'era una volta l'amore (Ho dovuto ammazzarlo)" | Cremonini; Magnanini | Mameli | 4:50 |
| 10. | "Cuore di cane" | Cremonini; Petrella | Mameli | 4:27 |
| 11. | "Cos'hai nella testa?" | Cremonini; Petrella; Magnanini | Mameli | 3:42 |
| Total length: | | | | 42:04 |

== Charts ==
=== Weekly charts ===
| Chart (2014) | Position |
|---|---|
| Italian Albums (FIMI) | 1 |

=== Year-end charts ===
| Chart (2014) | Position |
|---|---|
| Italy (FIMI) | 20 |

== Certifications ==
Certifications for "Logico"
| Region | Certification | Certified units/sales |
|---|---|---|
| Italy (FIMI) | Platinum | 50,000^{*} |
^{*} Sales figures based on certification alone.
