= Cesare Cremonini (musician) =

Italian singer-songwriter and actor

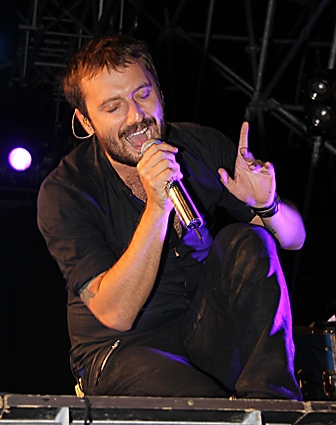
- Cremonini in concert in 2009

Background information
- Born: 27 March 1980 (age 46); Bologna, Italy
- Genre: Pop
- Occupations: Singer; songwriter; record producer; actor
- Instruments: Vocals; piano
- Years active: 1999–present
- Labels: Warner Music; Tre Cuori; Universal Music
- Website: cesarecremonini.it

Cesare Cremonini (Italian pronunciation: [ˈtʃeːzare kremoˈniːni, ˈtʃɛː-]; born 27 March 1980) is an Italian singer-songwriter, record producer and actor.

Cremonini started his career as the lead vocalist of Italian band Lùnapop between 1999 and 2002. In 2002, he signed with Warner Music Group publishing three studio albums Bagus, Maggese and Il primo bacio sulla Luna, reaching the top-ten of the Italian Albums Chart. In 2011, Cremonini signed with Universal Music Italia publishing his fourth studio album La teoria dei colori promoted by the singles "Il comico (Sai che risate)" and "La nuova stella di Broadway".

In 2014, he released his first number one album Logico and the relative live album Più che logico (Live), both promoted by several successful singles including "Logico #1", "Buon viaggio (Share the Love)" and "Lost in the Weekend". In 2017, Cremonini released Possibili scenari, his second number one album on the Italian Album Chart and the singles "Poetica" and "Nessuno vuole essere Robin". In 2021, he published his second greatest hits album Cremonini 2C2C - The Best Of and in 2022 his seventh studio album La ragazza del futuro. In 2024 he publieshed his third number-one album Alaska Baby, promoted by the number-one single "Ora che non ho più te."

In 2013, he won a Nastro d'Argento for Best Original Song writing and composing "Amor mio", performed by Gianni Morandi, for the film The Landlords directed by Edoardo Gabbriellini. He also won several Italian Music Awards and the MTV History for his career at the MTV Italian Music Awards.

== Life and career ==
Cremonini was born in Bologna, Italy, on 27 March 1980, second son of Carla, a professor of literature, and Giovanni Cremonini, a medical nutritionist (1924-2019). From an early age, he began studying piano. After listening to British rock band Queen, he started listening to pop rock music and writing his first songs at the age of 14. In 1996, along with some friends and classmates at the liceo scientifico Sabin, he formed a group called Senza filtro, with whom he performed at parties and clubs in Bologna, singing covers of The Beatles, Oasis, Radiohead and Queen. In late 1996, he met Walter Mameli, who has since become his music producer and manager.

=== 1999–2010: Lùnapop and solo career ===
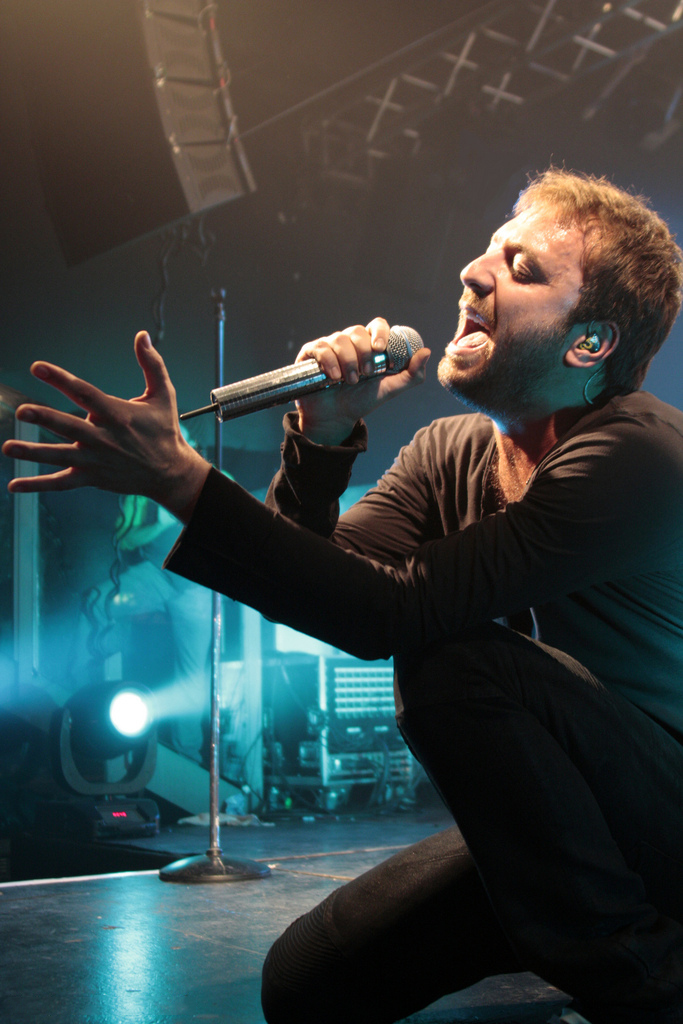
Cremonini in 2009.

In 1999, he became the frontman of Italian band Lùnapop, with Nicola Balestri, Gabriele Galassi, Alessandro De Simone and Michele Giuliani, publishing the album …Squérez? and several commercially successful songs, including "50 special" and "Qualcosa di grande". In 2002, for management and contractual reasons, the group stopped producing music, leading the members to take different working directions. Cremonini consequently launched his solo career, publishing his debut solo studio album Bagus in November 2002 through Warner Music Italy. The album peaked at number nine on the Italian Albums Chart and was promoted by the singles "Gli uomini e le donne sono uguali" and "Vieni a vedere perché", both reaching the top ten of the Italian Singles Chart.

After a three year break, Cremonini published his second studio album Maggese on 10 June 2005, which debuted at number seven on the Italian Album Chart. The lead single "Marmellata #25" peaked at number 11 on the Italian Singles Chart and was certified double platinum by FIMI. In November 2006, he published his first live album 1+8+24. In 2008, Cremonini published the third studio album Il primo bacio sulla Luna, becoming his third top ten album, which featured the single "Dicono di me".

In 2010, Cremonini collaborated with Jovanotti on "Mondo", which anticipated the singer's first greatest hits album 1999-2010 The Greatest Hits. The second single was "Hello!" with pop singer Malika Ayane, Cremonini's girlfriend at the time. The same year, Cremonini also co-wrote with musician Alessandro Magnanini the theme song for the radio program 105 all'una, hosted daily on Radio 105 by Alessandro Cattelan.

=== 2011–2018: Label change and commercial success ===
In 2011, Cremonini signed with Universal Music Italia with the singer company that owns his recording rights Trecuori srl. The following year he released his fourth studio album La teoria dei colori, which debuted at number two on the Italian Albums Chart and was certified double platinum by FIMI. It was promoted by several commercial successful singles, including "Il comico (Sai che risate)" and "La nuova stella di Broadway"; the latter of which peaked at number nine and was certified quadruple platinum.

In 2014, he published his fifth studio Logico, which debuted at number one on the album chart becoming Cremonini's first number one album in his career. The album featured several successful singles, including "Logico #1", which peaked at number four on the singles chart. The following year, he published his second live album Più che logico (Live). It reached number two on the chart and was certified platinum. It was promoted by "Buon viaggio (Share the Love)" and "Lost in the Weekend". On 24 November 2017, Cremonini released Possibili scenari, which became his second number one album on the Italian album chart and was certified double platinum. The lead single "Poetica" peaked at number two on the Italian singles charts and was certified triple platinum. The second single "Nessuno vuole essere Robin" was published on 23 February 2018.

=== 2019–present: Cremonini 2C2C, La ragazza del futuro and Alaska Baby ===
On 29 November 2019, he published his second greatest hits Cremonini 2C2C - The Best Of, becoming his third number one chart project, promoted by the new songs "Al telefono" and "Giovane stupida". On 20 June 2020, the list of new dates for the 2021 stadium tour was announced, following the postponement of the 2020 tour due to the COVID-19 pandemic in Italy.

On 25 February 2022, he published his seventh studio album La ragazza del futuro, which peaked at number two on the Italian Album Charts and was certified gold by FIMI. The album was anticipated by the singles "Colibrì" and "La ragazza del futuro", both performed live on the night the singer-songwriter was a guest artist at the Sanremo Music Festival 2022. After the promotional tour in Italy, he published his third live album Cremonini Live: Stadi 2022.

On 24 September 2024, he published the single "Ora che non ho più te", which peaked at number one on the Italian singles chart. On 29 November 2024, Cremonini published his eighth studio album Alaska Baby. The album was also promoted by the "San Luca" with Luca Carboni, "Nonostante tutto" with Elisa and "Alaska Baby".

== Discography ==
- Bagus (2002)
- Maggese (2005)
- Il primo bacio sulla Luna (2008)
- La teoria dei colori (2012)
- Logico (2014)
- Possibili scenari (2017)
- La ragazza del futuro (2022)
- Alaska Baby (2024)
- Amateur (2026)

== Filmography ==
=== Film ===
Year	Title	Role(s)	Notes	Ref
2001	Un amore perfetto	Celestino		
2003	Incantato	St. Lucy Priest		
2011	The Big Heart of Girls	Carlino Vigetti		
2024	The American Backyard	Ugo Oste		

=== Television ===
Year	Title	Role(s)	Notes	Ref
2001	Via Zanardi 33	Gustavo	2 episodes	

== Awards and nominations ==
Year	Ceremony	Category	Work	Result
2003	Italian Music Awards	Best Italian Male Artist	Himself	Nominated
2003	Lunezia Award	Poetic Rock Award	"PadreMadre"	Won
2008	Premio Videoclip Italiano	Videography Special Award	Himself	Won
2009	TRL Awards	History Award	Himself	Won
2011	TRL Awards	Too Much Award	Himself	Nominated
2011	TRL Awards	Super Man Award	Himself	Nominated
2012	MTV Europe Music Awards	Best Italian Act	Himself	Nominated
2013	Nastro d'Argento	Best Original Song	"Amor mio" (written by Cremonini, performed by Gianni Morandi)	Won
