= Poetica (song) =

Single by Cesare Cremonini

from the album Possibili scenari
- B-side: "La macchina del tempo"
- Released: 3 November 2017
- Recorded: 2016–2017
- Studio: Mille Galassie Studio, Bologna, Italy; Orchestra: AIR, London, UK
- Length: 4:53
- Label: Trecuori srl
- Songwriters: Cesare Cremonini; Alessandro Magnanini
- Producer: Walter Mameli

Cesare Cremonini singles chronology
"Eccolo qua il Natale – Una notte tra tante" (2015)	"Poetica" (2017)	"Nessuno vuole essere Robin" (2018)

Music video
- "Poetica" on YouTube

"Poetica" is a song by Italian singer-songwriter Cesare Cremonini. It was released on 3 November 2017 through Universal Music Italy, as the lead single from his sixth studio album Possibili scenari.

The song peaked at number two on the Italian Top Singles FIMI chart and has been certified triple platinum in Italy.

== Composition ==
In the song, traditional pop-rock instruments such as guitars and keyboards meet many orchestral instruments such as piano, strings, saxophone and other brass instruments: the result is what the press has called "an ambitious return to epic pop". In an interview with TV Sorrisi e Canzoni Cremonini explained the meaning of the song:

"A song today can still afford the luxury of lasting through the years, if it has the characteristics. The idea that we only do something for the present, to make sure we have a warm place to sleep, is a convenient ratio, and I certainly am tempted to cling to these solutions. But "Poetica" is a five-and-a-half minute piece: it doesn't have the peculiar characteristics of the radio piece, it's played entirely, it has particular arrangements. I took the plunge, tried the thrill of courage: and I was rewarded."

The song is a journey into the ups and downs of life and aims to encourage to never give up, because there is always a way to overcome obstacles. In fact, the author has also stated it is a song "written, played and sung without fear" and has declared it is a dedication of love for life.

== Music video ==
The music video for the song, directed by Gaetano Morbioli, was released on November 21, 2017, through the singer's YouTube channel.

== Charts ==
=== Weekly charts ===
Chart (2017)	Peak position
Italy (FIMI)	2
Italy Airplay (EarOne)	1

=== Year-end charts ===
Chart (2025)	Position
Italy (FIMI)	96

== Certifications ==
Certifications for "Poetica"
Region	Certification	Certified units/sales
Italy (FIMI)	3× Platinum	300,000^{‡}
^{‡} Sales+streaming figures based on certification alone.
