= IL-3 =

IL-3 may refer to:

- Interleukin 3
- Illinois's 3rd congressional district
- Illinois Route 3

== See also ==
- Il Tre, or Il 3
