= Rebecca Ghilardi =

Italian pair skater (born 1999)

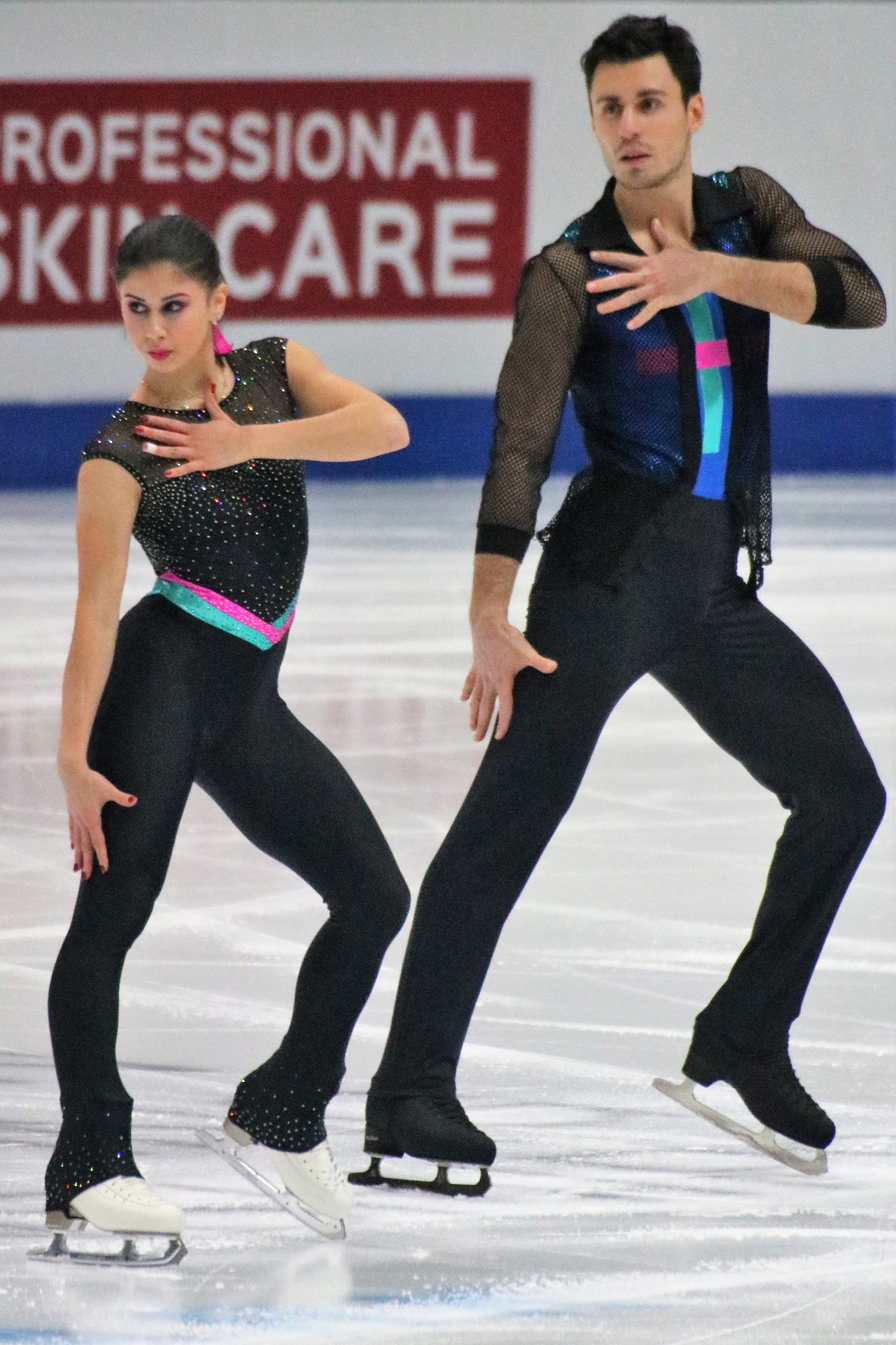
- Rebecca Ghilardi and Filippo Ambrosini at the 2020 European Championships

Personal information
- Born: 10 October 1999 (age 27) Seriate, Italy
- Home town: Pedrengo, Italy
- Height: 1.60 m (5 ft 3 in)

Figure skating career
- Country: Italy
- Discipline: Pair skating (2016–26); Women's singles (2013–16)
- Partner: Filippo Ambrosini (2016–26)
- Coach: Daniel Aggiano; Raffaella Cazzaniga
- Skating club: G.S. Fiamme Azzurre
- Began skating: 2007
- Retired: May 4, 2026

Medal record
Event	Gold medal – first place	Silver medal – second place	Bronze medal – third place
European Championships	0	1	1
Italian Championships	1	7	2
Medal list
European Championships
Silver medal – second place	2023 Espoo	Pairs
Bronze medal – third place	2024 Kaunas	Pairs
Italian Championships
Gold medal – first place	2024 Pinerolo	Pairs
Silver medal – second place	2019 Trento	Pairs
Silver medal – second place	2020 Bergamo	Pairs
Silver medal – second place	2021 Egna	Pairs
Silver medal – second place	2022 Turin	Pairs
Silver medal – second place	2023 Brunico	Pairs
Silver medal – second place	2025 Varese	Pairs
Silver medal – second place	2026 Begamo	Pairs
Bronze medal – third place	2017 Egna	Pairs
Bronze medal – third place	2018 Milan	Pairs

Rebecca Ghilardi (born 10 October 1999) is an Italian retired pair skater. With her skating partner, Filippo Ambrosini, she a two-time European Championship medalist, four-time ISU Grand Prix medalist, six-time ISU Challenger Series medalist, the 2024 Italian national champion, and a seven-time Italian national silver medalist (2019–23, 2025–26). The pair represented Italy at the 2022 and 2026 Winter Olympics.

== Career ==
=== Early years ===
Ghilardi began learning to skate in 2007. Competing in ladies' singles, she became the Italian novice silver medalist in March 2013 and earned the junior silver medal in December of the same year. She was coached by Tiziana Rosaspina.

Ghilardi last appeared in ladies' singles in December 2015. In 2016, she teamed up with Filippo Ambrosini to compete in pair skating.

=== Partnership with Filippo Ambrosini ===
==== 2016–2017 season: Debut of Ghilardi/Ambrosini ====
Making their international debut, Ghilardi/Ambrosini won the bronze medal at the 2016 CS Lombardia Trophy in September. They took bronze at the International Cup of Nice a month later. In December, they became the Italian national bronze medalists. They placed fourteenth in the short program, eleventh in the free skate and eleventh overall at the 2017 European Championships, which took place in January in Ostrava, Czech Republic. They trained under Rosanna Murante and Tiziana Rosaspina in Bergamo.

==== 2017–2018 season ====
Ghilardi/Ambrosini placed eighth at the 2017 CS Warsaw Cup in November. The following month, they repeated as national bronze medalists. They won silver at the Toruń Cup in January and bronze at the International Challenge Cup in February.

==== 2018–2019 season: World Championships debut ====
Ghilardi/Ambrosini competed at several Challenger events at the beginning of the season, including taking the silver medal at the 2018 CS Inge Solar Memorial. They won the silver medal as well as the Italian Championships and were sent to the 2018 European Championships, where they finished in ninth place. At their first World Championships, they finished nineteenth among the nineteen competitors.

==== 2019–2020 season: Grand Prix debut ====
Ghilardi/Ambrosini made their Grand Prix debut at the 2019 Internationaux de France, where they placed eighth. They then placed seventh at the 2019 Rostelecom Cup. After taking silver at the Italian Championships, they finished the season at the 2020 European Championships, placing eighth. They had been assigned to compete at the World Championships in Montreal, but these were cancelled as a result of the coronavirus pandemic.

==== 2020–2021 season ====
With the pandemic continuing to affect events, Ghilardi/Ambrossini started their season off at the 2020 CS Nebelhorn Trophy, which was only attended by pairs teams training in Europe. They were third after the short program, and after the withdrawal of Hase/Seegert, the leaders after that segment, they narrowly won their first Challenger Series title over silver medalists Hocke/Kunkel. They were scheduled to compete on the Grand Prix at the 2020 Internationaux de France, but the event was cancelled due to the pandemic.

They placed seventeenth at the 2021 World Championships in Stockholm.

==== 2021–2022 season: Beijing Olympics ====
Ghilardi/Ambrosini began the season at the 2021 CS Lombardia Trophy, winning the bronze medal. They had initially been assigned to compete on the Grand Prix at the 2021 Cup of China, but following the event's cancellation, they were reassigned to a special home 2021 Gran Premio d'Italia, held in Turin. They placed fifth. They were fifth as well at their second Grand Prix, the 2021 Internationaux de France. They placed fourth at the Budapest Trophy.

At the Italian championships, Ghilardi/Ambrosini won the silver medal. Later, they were named to their first Olympic team. Competing first at the 2022 European Championships, Ghilardi/Ambrosini placed fourth in the short program. They were fifth in the free skate and dropped to fifth overall. Ghilardi said it was an emotional moment for them to have made the final group of the free skate alongside the elite Russian teams.

Competing at the 2022 Winter Olympics in the pairs event, Ghilardi/Ambrosini placed sixteenth in the short program after Ghilardi fell twice, one of those being on her triple Salchow attempt. They were the final team to qualify for the free skate. They moved up to fourteenth overall in the free. The team was scheduled to finish the season at the 2022 World Championships, but withdrew after Ghilardi tested positive for COVID.

==== 2022–2023 season: European Championships silver, Grand Prix gold ====
Ghilardi/Ambrosini won gold at the 2022 CS U.S. Classic in their first major competition of the season and their second ever Challenger title. On the Grand Prix, they placed fourth at the 2022 Grand Prix de France, 5.01 points back of bronze medalists Hocke/Kunkel. Despite missing the podium at their first event, they remained in contention to make the Grand Prix Final heading into their second, the 2022 Grand Prix of Espoo. In a relatively weak field, Ghilardi/Ambrosini set a new personal best in the short program (67.31), leading that segment by over four points. They won the free skate as well, setting a new personal best in total score (189.74), and taking the gold medal over Germans Efimova/Blommaert by almost twenty points. This was the first Grand Prix win for an Italian pair since 2013, and qualified them to the Grand Prix Final, to be held on home ice in Turin. They finished fifth at the Final.

After winning their fifth consecutive national silver medal, Ghilardi/Ambrosini competed at the 2023 European Championships in Espoo. With Russian pairs banned from competing due to the Russo-Ukrainian War, the podium at the European Championships was considered far more open than in recent seasons. Ghilardi and Ambrosini both made errors in the short program, finishing fifth in that segment. They went on to win the free skate, rising to second overall. With their compatriots, Italian national champions Conti/Macii, taking the gold medal in an historic first for their country, Italian pairs had the top two places on the podium. These were only the second and third pairs medals for Italian teams in the nearly century-old European pairs competition.

==== 2023–2024 season: European Championships bronze, Italian national title ====
Ghilardi/Ambrosini began the season with a fifth-place finish at the 2023 CS Lombardia Trophy. They won a silver medal in their second Challenger appearance of the season, the 2023 CS Finlandia Trophy, before winning the Diamond Spin. They started the Grand Prix at the 2023 Cup of China, placing second in the short program. They were second as well in the free skate despite Ghilardi falling on her triple Salchow attempt, and won the silver medal. Ghilardi said afterward that it "was hard today, and we are proud of our performance, and how we pushed until the end of the program." At the 2023 NHK Trophy, they placed fourth in the short program after both made jump errors, but rose in the free skate to win the bronze medal.

Ghilardi/Ambrosini finished the Grand Prix with the same placements as fellow Italian team Beccari/Guarise and Hungarians Pavlova/Sviatchenko, winning the tiebreaker on cumulative scores to be the sixth qualifiers to the Grand Prix Final. They finished fifth at the Final.

After winning their first Italian title, Ghilardi/Ambrosini competed at the 2024 European Championships, coming fifth in the short program after losing levels on their step sequence and death spiral elements. A second-place free skate lifted them to third overall, taking the bronze medal. Ghilardi called it "the best skate of the season for sure."

==== 2024–25 season: Grand Prix bronzes ====
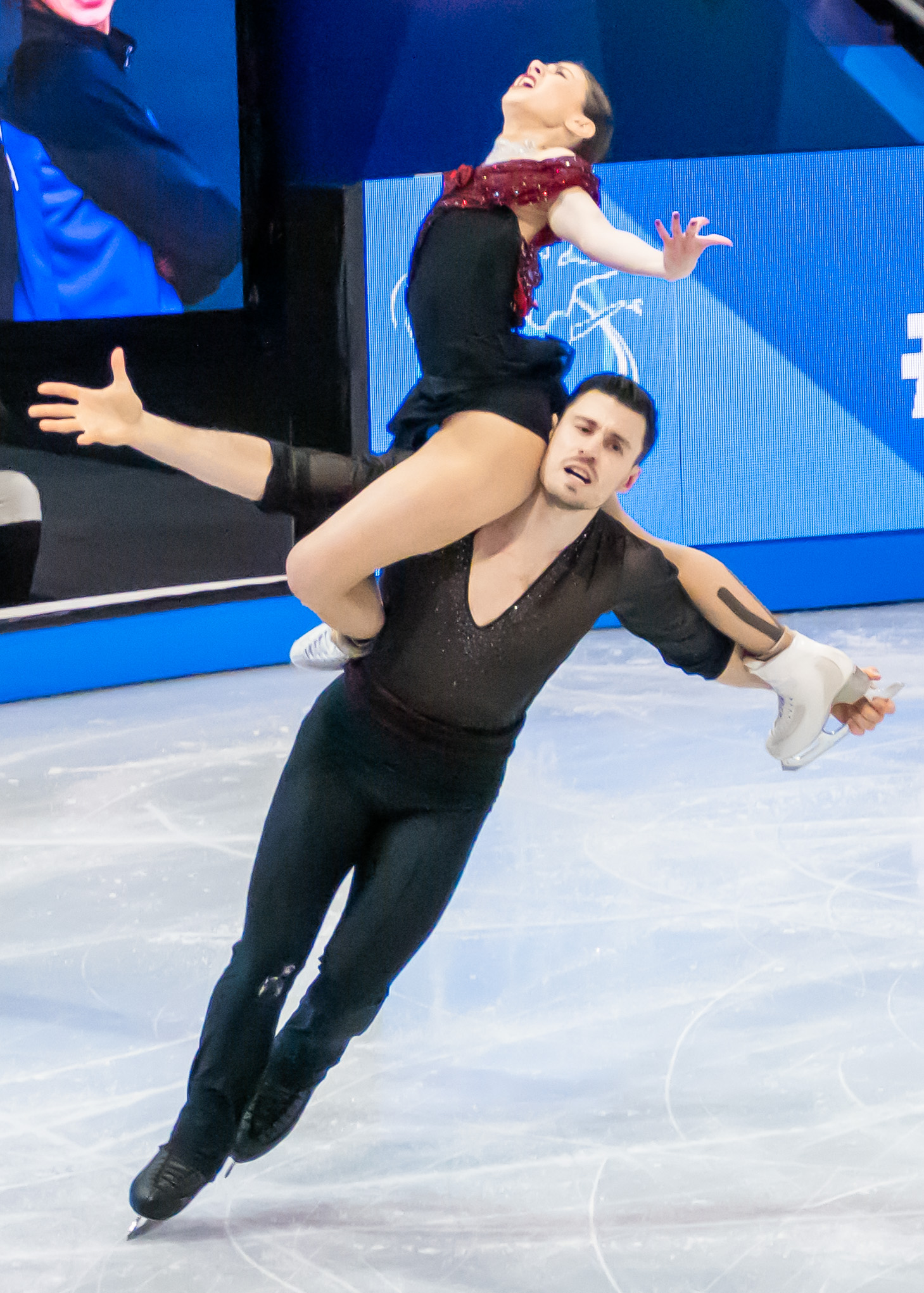
Ghilardi and Ambrosini performing a pair lift during their short program at the 2025 World Championships

During the off-season, Ghilardi and Ambrosini worked with their choreographers to create a new short program to the song "El Tango de Roxanne" from Moulin Rouge!, with the intention of depicting the worldwide social issue of violence against women.

Beginning the season by competing on the 2024–25 ISU Challenger Series, Ghilardi and Ambrosini finished sixth at the 2024 John Nicks International Pairs Competition and fourth at the 2024 Lombardia Trophy. Having initially skated to music from The Phantom of the Opera, the pair decided to return to their Dracula-themed program from the previous season following these events.

Ghilardi and Ambrosini then went on to win the gold at the 2024 Diamond Spin for a second consecutive time. Going on to compete on the 2024–25 Grand Prix circuit, Ghilardi and Ambrosini placed sixth in the short program at the 2024 Grand Prix de France, but third in the free skate, allowing them to win the bronze medal. They followed this up with a second bronze medal at the 2024 Finlandia Trophy. “We fought until the end, as always,” said Ghilardi. “Of course, it’s a bit harder if things don’t work out as planned and it’s nice of course to still be on the podium."

Although they were initially named as alternates to compete at the 2024–25 Grand Prix Final, they were later called up to compete following the withdrawal of Deanna Stellato-Dudek and Maxime Deschamps. Despite Ambrosini dealing with a leg injury, the pair took the opportunity to compete at the event, where they finished sixth. Two weeks later, they won the silver medal at the 2025 Italian Championships behind Conti/Macii.

Going on to compete at the 2025 European Championships in Tallinn, Estonia, Ghilardi/Ambrosini placed sixth in the short program and fifth in the free skate, finishing in sixth place overall. They followed up this result by winning gold at the Road to 26 Trophy in Milan, Italy, a test event for the 2026 Winter Olympics.

Selected to compete at the 2025 World Championships in Boston, Massachusetts, United States, Ghilardi/Ambrosini closed the season by finishing the event in thirteenth place overall.

==== 2025–26 season: Milano Cortina Olympics ====
Ghilardi/Ambrosini opened the season by winning silver at the 2025 Lombardia Trophy and finishing fourth at the 2025 CS Nebelhorn Trophy. Going on to compete on the 2025–26 Grand Prix series, the pair finished fifth at the 2025 Cup of China and seventh at the 2025 Finlandia Trophy.

In December, they won the silver medal behind Conti/Macii at the 2026 Italian Championships and were subsequently named to the 2026 Winter Olympic team. The following month, Ghilardi/Ambrosini competed at the 2026 European Championships in Sheffield, England, United Kingdom, where they finished in sixth place overall.

== Programs ==
=== Pair skating with Filippo Ambrosini ===
Season	Short program	Free skating	Exhibition
2025–2026	Nel blu, dipinto di blu (Volare) by Domenico Modugno performed by Il Volo choreo. by Raffaella Cazzaniga, Daniel Aggiano, Corrado Giordani	Poeta en el Mar by Vicente Amigo; Flamenco del Mar (Original Composition for Ghilardi-Ambrosini) by Lorenzo De Benedictis; V for Vivaldi by Duomo, Power-Haus, & Sebastian Pecznik choreo. by Raffaella Cazzaniga, Daniel Aggiano, Corrado Giordani	Capolavoro by Il Volo
2024–2025	El Tango de Roxanne (from Moulin Rouge!) performed by Ewan McGregor & José Feliciano choreo. by Luca Lanotte, Daniel Aggiano, Claudio Jurman, Carolina Kostner	The Brides (from Bram Stoker's Dracula) by Wojciech Kilar; Main Title (from Blood for Dracula) by Claudio Gizzi performed by Joohyun Park; Vampire Hunters (from Bram Stoker's Dracula) by Wojciech Kilar choreo. by Luca Lanotte; The Phantom of the Opera; Phantasia by Andrew Lloyd Webber, Julian Lloyd Webber, & Sarah Chang; The Phantom of the Opera Overture by Andrew Lloyd Webber; The Music of the Night performed by Gerard Butler choreo. by Luca Lanotte, Daniel Aggiano, Claudio Jurman, Carolina Kostner	Capolavoro by Il Volo
2023–2024	The Ecstasy of Gold (from The Good, the Bad and the Ugly) by Ennio Morricone; The Ecstasy of Gold by Ennio Morricone performed by Metallica choreo. by Luca Lanotte	The Brides (from Bram Stoker's Dracula) by Wojciech Kilar; Main Title (from Blood for Dracula) by Claudio Gizzi performed by Joohyun Park; Vampire Hunters (from Bram Stoker's Dracula) by Wojciech Kilar choreo. by Luca Lanotte	L'amour est un oiseau rebelle (from Carmen) by Georges Bizet performed by Maria Callas & Georges Prêtre; Mambo Italiano by Bob Merrill performed by Bette Midler, Luca Longobardi
2022–2023	Somebody to Love; Another One Bites the Dust by Queen choreo. by Luca Lanotte, Anna Cappellini, Corrado Giordani	Il barbiere di Siviglia by Gioachino Rossini choreo. by Luca Lanotte, Anna Cappellini, Corrado Giordani	The Greatest Gift by Andrea Bocelli, Matteo Bocelli, Virginia Bocelli; One by U2 ft. Mary J. Blige; Camera 209 by Alessandra Amoroso, DB Boulevard
2021–2022	Mambo Italiano by Bob Merrill performed by Bette Midler, Luca Longobardi	Grande amore by Il Volo; Letters (from W.E.) by Abel Korzeniowski	
2020–2021	Bring Me to Life by Evanescence	Grande amore by Il Volo	
2019–2020	Women by Florida Georgia Line & Jason Derulo; Kiss in the Sky by Jason Derulo	Once Upon a Time in America by Ennio Morricone	
2018–2019	Vivo Tango by Maxime Rodriguez	The Ballad of Bonnie and Clyde by Georgie Fame	
2017–2018	Summertime by George Gershwin performed by Rick Wakeman	Pas de Deux (from The Nutcracker) by Pyotr Ilyich Tchaikovsky	
2016–2017	Oblivion by Astor Piazzolla choreo. by Luca Mantovani, Corrado Giordani	Homecoming by Thomas Bergersen choreo. by Luca Mantovani, Corrado Giordani	

== Competitive highlights ==
- GP – Event of the ISU Grand Prix Series
- JGP – Event of the ISU Junior Grand Prix Series
- CS – Event of the ISU Challenger Series
- TBD – Assigned
- WD – Withdrew from competition
- C – Event was cancelled

=== Pair skating with Filippo Ambrosini ===
Competition placements at senior level
Season	2016–17	2017–18	2018–19	2019–20	2020–21	2021–22	2022–23	2023–24	2024–25	2025–26
Winter Olympics						14th				12th
World Championships			19th	C	17th				13th	
European Championships	11th		9th	8th		5th	2nd	3rd	6th	6th
Grand Prix Final							5th	5th	6th	
Italian Championships	3rd	3rd	2nd	2nd	2nd	2nd	2nd	1st	2nd	2nd
GP Cup of China								2nd		5th
GP Finland							1st		3rd	7th
GP France				8th		5th	4th		3rd	
GP Italy						5th				
GP NHK Trophy								3rd		
GP Rostelecom Cup				7th						
CS Alpen Trophy			2nd							
CS Finlandia Trophy								2nd		
CS Golden Spin of Zagreb				6th						
CS John Nicks Pairs							1st		6th	
CS Lombardia Trophy	3rd	WD	6th			3rd		5th	4th	
CS Nebelhorn Trophy			6th		1st					4th
CS Ondrej Nepela Trophy			4th							
CS Tallinn Trophy			4th							
CS U.S. Classic							1st			
CS Warsaw Cup	5th	8th					2nd			
Budapest Trophy						4th				
Challenge Cup		3rd		3rd						
Cup of Nice	3rd									
Cup of Tyrol	4th									
Diamond Spin								1st	1st	
Ice Star			5th							
Lombardia Trophy										2nd
Mentor Cup		2nd								
Road to 26 Trophy									1st	
Shanghai Trophy				4th						
Volvo Open Cup				1st						

=== Women's singles ===
Competition placements at junior level
Season	2013–14	2014–15	2015–16
Italian Championships	2nd	6th	4th
Bavarian Open	5th		
Denkova-Staviski Cup		1st	4th
Gardena Spring Trophy	7th		
Golden Bear of Zagreb			2nd
Hellmut Seibt Memorial		8th	
Lombardia Trophy		WD	6th
Merano Cup		5th	
Open d'Andorra		1st	
Skate Celje	2nd		

== Detailed results ==
ISU personal best scores in the +5/-5 GOE System
Segment	Type	Score	Event
Total	TSS	195.68	2024 European Championships
Short program	TSS	69.11	2024 CS Lombardia Trophy
Short program	TES	38.29	2026 Winter Olympics
Short program	PCS	31.85	2024 CS Lombardia Trophy
Free skating	TSS	130.81	2024 European Championships
Free skating	TES	66.73	2024 European Championships
Free skating	PCS	64.08	2024 European Championships

ISU personal best scores in the +3/-3 GOE System
Segment	Type	Score	Event
Total	TSS	148.48	2017 European Championships
Short program	TSS	55.20	2016 CS Lombardia Trophy
Short program	TES	31.04	2016 CS Lombardia Trophy
Short program	PCS	24.16	2016 CS Lombardia Trophy
Free skating	TSS	97.77	2017 European Championships
Free skating	TES	54.18	2017 European Championships
Free skating	PCS	45.12	2016 CS Lombardia Trophy

=== Pair skating with Filippo Ambrosini ===
Results in the 2016–17 season
Date	Event	SP		FS		Total	
Date	Event	P	Score	P	Score	P	Score
Sep 8–11, 2016	(Italy) 2016 CS Lombardia Trophy	3	55.20	4	89.50	3	144.70
Oct 19–23, 2016	(France) 2016 Cup of Nice	4	51.26	3	96.04	3	147.30
Nov 17–20, 2016	(Poland) 2016 CS Warsaw Cup	4	47.90	5	80.58	5	128.48
Dec 14–17, 2016	(Italy) 2017 European Championships	3	46.10	3	94.22	3	140.32
Jan 25–29, 2017	(Czech Republic) 2017 European Championships	14	50.71	11	97.77	11	148.48
Feb 28 – Mar 6, 2017	(Austria) 2017 Cup of Tyrol	4	52.14	4	97.32	4	149.46

Results in the 2017–18 season
Date	Event	SP		FS		Total	
Date	Event	P	Score	P	Score	P	Score
Nov 16–19, 2017	(Poland) 2017 CS Warsaw Cup	7	49.88	8	87.68	7	137.56
Dec 13–16, 2017	(Italy) 2018 Italian Championships	3	49.78	3	79.14	3	128.92
Jan 30 – Sep 4, 2018	(Poland) 2018 Mentor Toruń Cup	1	52.49	2	93.50	2	145.99
Feb 22–25, 2018	(Netherlands) 2018 International Challenge Cup	2	52.64	2	90.90	3	143.54

Results in the 2018–19 season
Date	Event	SP		FS		Total	
Date	Event	P	Score	P	Score	P	Score
Sep 12–16, 2018	(Italy) 2018 CS Lombardia Trophy	5	48.48	6	94.73	6	143.21
Sep 19–22, 2018	(Slovakia) 2018 CS Ondrej Nepela Trophy	4	53.09	3	101.93	4	155.02
Sep 26–29, 2018	(Germany) 2018 CS Nebelhorn Trophy	8	47.71	5	107.68	6	155.39
Oct 18–21, 2018	(Belarus) 2018 Ice Star	5	51.10	5	94.01	5	145.11
Nov 11–18, 2018	(Austria) 2018 Alpen Trophy	2	55.15	2	108.59	2	163.74
Nov 26 – Dec 2, 2018	(Estonia) 2018 CS Tallinn Trophy	3	57.38	4	99.46	4	156.84
Dec 13–16, 2018	(Italy) 2019 Italian Championships	2	57.41	2	102.19	2	159.60
Jan 21–27, 2019	(Belarus) 2019 European Championships	8	54.48	10	93.27	9	147.75
Mar 18–24, 2019	(Japan) 2019 World Championships	18	52.02	19	81.73	19	133.75

Results in the 2019–20 season
Date	Event	SP		FS		Total	
Date	Event	P	Score	P	Score	P	Score
Oct 3–5, 2019	(China) 2019 Shanghai Trophy	4	53.71	4	100.78	5	154.49
Nov 1–3, 2019	2019 Internationaux de France	5	59.62	8	98.30	8	157.92
Nov 5–10, 2019	(Latvia) 2019 Volvo Open Cup	2	58.79	1	116.78	1	175.57
Nov 15–17, 2019	(Russia) 2019 Rostelecom Cup	7	55.08	6	107.68	7	162.76
Dec 4–7, 2019	(Croatia) 2019 CS Golden Spin of Zagreb	8	53.10	6	104.18	6	157.28
Dec 12–15, 2019	(Italy) 2020 Italian Championships	2	58.02	2	101.00	2	159.02
Jan 20–26, 2020	(Austria) 2020 European Championships	8	56.85	10	99.89	8	156.74
Feb 20–23, 2020	(Netherlands) 2020 International Challenge Cup	3	60.49	5	102.48	3	162.97

Results in the 2020–21 season
Date	Event	SP		FS		Total	
Date	Event	P	Score	P	Score	P	Score
Sep 23–26, 2020	(Germany) 2020 CS Nebelhorn Trophy	3	58.32	1	96.29	1	154.61
Dec 12–13, 2020	(Italy) 2021 Italian Championships	3	54.67	2	106.96	2	161.63
Mar 22–28, 2021	(Sweden) 2021 World Championships	15	54.70	18	99.34	17	154.04

Results in the 2021–22 season
Date	Event	SP		FS		Total	
Date	Event	P	Score	P	Score	P	Score
Sep 9–12, 2021	(Italy) 2021 Lombardia Trophy	3	61.91	3	110.77	3	172.68
Oct 14–17, 2021	(Hungary) 2021 Budapest Trophy	5	51.94	4	102.15	4	154.09
Nov 5–7, 2021	(Italy) 2021 Gran Premio d'Italia	5	60.89	6	104.56	5	165.45
Nov 19–21, 2021	2021 Internationaux de France	5	64.60	5	111.59	5	176.19
Dec 4–5, 2021	(Italy) 2022 Italian Championships	2	60.23	2	120.59	2	180.82
Jan 10–16, 2022	(Estonia) 2022 European Championships	4	62.76	5	116.14	5	178.90
Feb 18–19, 2022	(China) 2022 Winter Olympics	16	55.83	14	109.60	14	165.43

Results in the 2022–23 season
Date	Event	SP		FS		Total	
Date	Event	P	Score	P	Score	P	Score
Sep 8–9, 2022	(United States) 2022 John Nicks Pairs Challenge	1	62.08	1	118.39	1	180.47
Sep 12–16, 2022	(France) 2022 CS U.S. Classic	1	64.78	1	124.44	1	189.22
Nov 4–6, 2022	2022 Grand Prix de France	4	60.93	4	113.79	4	174.72
Nov 17–20, 2022	(Poland) 2022 CS Warsaw Cup	1	65.79	2	118.42	2	184.21
Nov 25–27, 2022	(Finland) 2022 Grand Prix of Espoo	1	67.31	1	122.43	1	189.74
Dec 8–11, 2022	(Italy) 2022–23 Grand Prix Final	5	63.54	4	116.85	5	180.39
Dec 15–18, 2022	(Italy) 2023 Italian Championships	2	66.85	2	124.36	2	191.21
Jan 25–29, 2023	(Finland) 2023 European Championships	5	59.48	1	127.48	2 (yes)	186.96

Results in the 2023–24 season
Date	Event	SP		FS		Total	
Date	Event	P	Score	P	Score	P	Score
Sep 8–10, 2023	(Italy) 2023 CS Lombardia Trophy	7	54.99	3	127.34	5	182.33
Oct 4–8, 2023	(Finland) 2023 CS Finlandia Trophy	2	61.75	2	115.28	2	177.03
Oct 19–22, 2023	(Poland) 2023 Diamond Spin	1	66.84	1	115.62	1	182.46
Nov 10–12, 2023	2023 Cup of China	2	66.33	2	124.67	2	191.00
Nov 24–26, 2023	(Japan) 2023 NHK Trophy	4	62.98	3	123.49	3	186.47
Dec 7–10, 2023	(China) 2023–24 Grand Prix Final	5	61.91	4	126.94	5	188.85
Dec 22–23, 2023	(Italy) 2024 Italian Championships	2	66.69	1	126.19	1	192.88
Jan 8–14, 2024	(Lithuania) 2024 European Championships	5	64.87	2	130.81	3	195.68

Results in the 2024–25 season
Date	Event	SP		FS		Total	
Date	Event	P	Score	P	Score	P	Score
Sep 3–4, 2024	(United States) 2024 CS John Nicks Pairs Competition	3	64.61	7	108.00	6	172.61
Sep 12–15, 2024	(Italy) 2024 CS Lombardia Trophy	3	69.11	4	123.36	4	192.47
Oct 17–20, 2024	(Poland) 2024 Diamond Spin	1	63.72	1	129.61	1	193.33
Nov 1–3, 2024	(Italy) 2024 Grand Prix de France	6	60.74	3	115.88	3	176.62
Nov 15–17, 2024	(Finland) 2024 Finlandia Trophy	2	67.43	6	114.16	3	181.59
Dec 5–8, 2024	(France) 2024–25 Grand Prix Final	6	65.80	6	115.72	6	181.52
Dec 19–21, 2024	(Italy) 2025 Italian Championships	2	70.31	2	117.90	2	188.21
Jan 28 – Feb 2, 2025	(Estonia) 2025 European Championships	6	60.95	5	119.91	6	180.86
Feb 18–20, 2025	(Italy) Road to 26 Trophy	1	62.58	2	108.44	1	171.02
Mar 25–30, 2025	(United States) 2025 World Championships	14	60.10	14	113.98	13	174.08

Results in the 2025–26 season
Date	Event	SP		FS		Total	
Date	Event	P	Score	P	Score	P	Score
Sep 11–14, 2025	(Italy) 2025 Lombardia Trophy	2	65.67	2	122.64	2	188.31
Sep 25–27, 2025	(Germany) 2025 CS Nebelhorn Trophy	4	66.82	4	126.21	4	193.03
Oct 24–26, 2025	2025 Cup of China	7	64.40	5	122.25	5	186.85
Nov 21–23, 2025	(Finland) 2025 Finlandia Trophy	6	62.49	7	105.39	7	167.88
Dec 17–20, 2025	(Italy) 2026 Italian Championships	2	69.67	2	122.21	2	191.88
Jan 13–18, 2026	(United Kingdom) 2026 European Championships	7	59.40	6	114.91	6	174.31
Feb 6–19, 2026	(Italy) 2026 Winter Olympics	10	69.08	11	122.78	12	191.86
