= Pazza =

Single by Loredana Bertè

from the album Ribelle
- Language: Italian
- Released: 7 February 2024
- Genre: Rock
- Length: 2:48
- Label: Warner
- Songwriters: Loredana Bertè; Andrea Bonomo; Luca Chiaravalli; Andrea Pugliese
- Producers: Andrea Bonomo; Luca Chiaravalli

Loredana Bertè singles chronology
"Mare malinconia" (2022)	"Pazza" (2024)	"Bestiale" (2024)

Music video
- "Pazza" on YouTube

"Pazza" (transl. "Crazy") is a song co-written and recorded by Italian singer Loredana Bertè. It was released on 7 February 2024 and included on the singer's fifth official compilation album Ribelle.

It was written by Bertè with Andrea Pugliese, Andrea Bonomo and Luca Chiaravalli, and produced by the latter two.

The song served as the artist's entry for the Sanremo Music Festival 2024, the 74th edition of Italy's musical festival which doubles also as a selection of the act for the Eurovision Song Contest, where it placed seventh and was awarded with the Critics' prize, named after her sister Mia Martini. Shortly after, the song was selected to compete in the final of Una voce per San Marino 2024, the Sammarinese national selection for the contest, where it finished second.

== Music video ==
A music video to accompany the release of "Pazza", directed by Matteo Colombo, was first released onto YouTube on 7 February 2024.

== Charts ==
=== Weekly charts ===
Weekly chart performance for "Pazza"
Chart (2024)	Peak position
Italy (FIMI)	8
Italy Airplay (EarOne)	22
Switzerland (Schweizer Hitparade)	66

=== Year-end charts ===
2024 year-end chart performance for "Pazza"
Chart (2024)	Position
Italy (FIMI)	56

== Certifications ==
Certifications for "Pazza"
Region	Certification	Certified units/sales
Italy (FIMI)	Platinum	100,000^{‡}
^{‡} Sales+streaming figures based on certification alone.
