= Loredana Bertè =

Italian singer-songwriter (born 1950)

- Bertè in 2019

Background information
- Born: Loredana Carmela Rosaria Bertè; 20 September 1950 (age 76); Bagnara Calabra, Reggio Calabria, Italy
- Genres: Pop; rock; reggae
- Occupations: Singer; songwriter; record producer; actress
- Years active: 1969–present
- Spouse: Björn Borg (m. 1989–1993)
- Relatives: Mia Martini (sister)

Loredana Carmela Rosaria Bertè, simply known as Loredana Bertè (Italian pronunciation: [loreˈdaːna berˈtɛ]; born 20 September 1950) is an Italian singer, songwriter and actress. She has worked with prominent Italian songwriters such as Pino Daniele, Ivano Fossati, Mario Lavezzi, Mango and Enrico Ruggeri, among others. She has experimented with different genres, from rock to reggae, from funk to pop. Bertè is known for the eccentric clothing she wears onstage for her performances.

== Early life ==
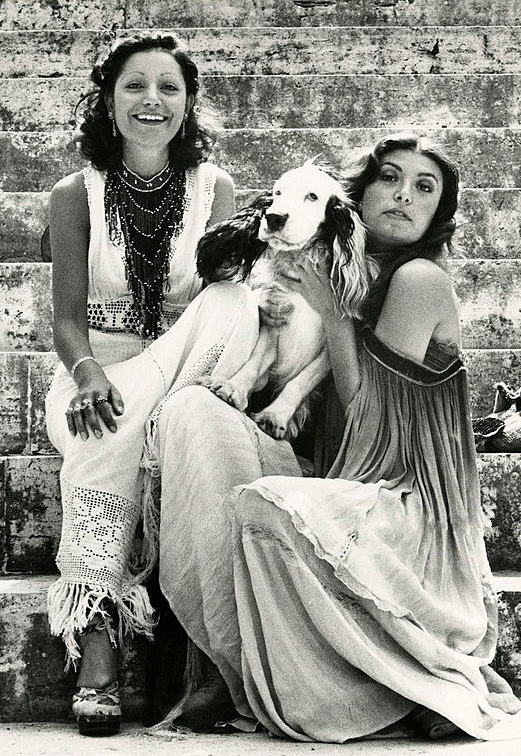
Loredana Bertè (right) and her sister Mia Martini

Bertè was born in Bagnara Calabra, Province of Reggio Calabria, in Southern Italy, the third of four daughters, three years after her sister Domenica. Her parents, Giuseppe Radames Bertè and Maria Salvina Dato, were both school teachers. Loredana spent her childhood in Porto Recanati and then in Ancona. After her parents separated, Bertè moved with her mother to Rome where she attended the local Art Institute.

== Career ==
In the early 1970s, she performed as a go-go dancer in television and radio shows such as "Bandiera gialla" and "Stasera Rita!". She later joined the dance troupe of the Piper Club in Rome, where she met Renato Zero. In 1969, both Bertè, Zero and Teo Teocoli starred in the Italian edition of the musical "Hair". In 1970, Loredana and her sister Domenica, who had by then changed her name to Mia Martini, performed as backing vocalists for Chico Buarque de Holanda. While Martini would consequently start a successful music career, recording songs like "Piccolo uomo" and "Minuetto", Loredana continued to pursue theatre. In 1972, she performed in "Ciao Rudy" and "Orfeo 9". In 1974, producers Alfredo Cerruti and Enrico Riccardi persuaded Loredana to record her first album, Streaking. Bertè's second album, "Normale o Super" included "Sei Bellissima", Bertè's first domestic hit. In 1978, Bertè started a relationship with Ivano Fossati. Fossati produced the single "E la luna bussò", which is considered one of the early mainstream reggae songs in Italy.

In the early 1980s, Bertè spent a year in New York to work on her next album. Elio Fiorucci introduced her to Andy Warhol at the Factory. Warhol and Bertè collaborated on the music video for her song "Movie". In 1982, she won Festivalbar with "Non sono una signora". In 1985, she recorded the album Carioca in collaboration with Djavan. In 1986, she participated in the Sanremo Music Festival with the song "Re". In 1988, she met and married Björn Borg. The marriage would end in 1992. In 1993, Bertè and Mia Martini collaborated on the song "Stiamo come stiamo". On 12 May 1995, Martini was found unresponsive in her apartment in Cardano al Campo (Varese). Martini's death proved to be a devastating moment in Bertè's life.

In the early 2000s, Loredana returned to theatre, performing with Carla Fracci in "Gerusalemme" at the Baths of Caracalla in Rome. She entrusted the direction of the three video clips that are part of the mini-CD "Dimmi che mi ami" of 2002. Two years later, she took part in "Music Farm", the first reality show on Italian TV involving famous singers. Thanks to the show's proceeds, she produced the new album "Babybertè" (2005) by herself.

In April 2010, she suffered a bad fall, and the related surgery forced her to a lengthy hospitalisation. She returned to the Sanremo Music Festival the following year, finishing fourth with the Gigi D'Alessio song "Respirare". Her following tour, "Bandabertè", ended up in Russia, where she participated in the international White Nights Festival in St. Petersburg.

In 2015, she played the judge's role in the talent "Friends of Maria De Filippi". In 2017, she recorded the songs "Allegria" with J-Ax and Fedez and "Occhi di Gatto" with Cristina D'Avena.

In 2016 Bertè staged a big show at the Verona Arena called "Amiche in Arena", performing a series of duets with other Italian female artists, including Fiorella Mannoia, Gianna Nannini, Patty Pravo and Irene Grandi.

Bertè's song "J'adore Venise" was included in Luca Guadagnino's Oscar-winning film's soundtrack, Call Me By Your Name (2017).

In 2018, she topped the Italian charts again with "Non ti dico no", a song made in collaboration with the reggae dancehall band Boomdabash. She also duetted with Fabio Rovazzi and J-Ax in "Senza pensieri".

She competed in the Sanremo Music Festival 2024 with the song "Pazza", finishing in seventh place but being awarded the Critics' prize, named after her sister Mia Martini. Shortly after, she was selected to compete in the final of Una voce per San Marino 2024, the Sammarinese national selection for the Eurovision Song Contest 2024, with the same song; she placed second.

== Personal life ==
Bertè was married to tennis star Björn Borg from 1989 to 1993.

== Discography ==
=== Studio albums ===
List of studio albums, with selected chart positions and certifications
| Title | Album details | Peak chart positions | Certifications |
| Title | Album details | ITA | Certifications |
|---|---|---|---|
| Streaking | Released: 1 June 1974; Label: CGD; Formats: CD, LP, digital download | — | |
| Normale o super | Released: 1 June 1976; Label: CGD; Formats: CD, LP, digital download | 43 | |
| T.I.R. | Released: 1 January 1978; Label: CGD; Formats: CD, LP, digital download | 24 | |
| Bandabertè | Released: 29 maggio 1979; Label: CGD; Formats: CD, LP, digital download | 11 | FIMI: Gold |
| Loredana Bertè | Released: 16 April 1980; Label: CGD; Formats: CD, LP, digital download, cassette | 14 | FIMI: Gold |
| Made in Italy | Released: 1 June 1981; Label: CGD; Formats: CD, LP, digital download, cassette | 23 | |
| Traslocando | Released: 20 September 1982; Label: CGD; Formats: CD, LP, digital download, cassette | 7 | FIMI: Platinum |
| Lorinedita | Released: 17 June 1983; Label: CGD; Formats: CD, LP, digital download, cassette | 39 | |
| Jazz | Released: 3 December 1983; Label: CBS; Formats: CD, LP, digital download, cassette | 4 | FIMI: Platinum |
| Savoir faire | Released: 21 December 1984; Label: CBS; Formats: CD, LP, digital download, cassette | 18 | |
| Carioca | Released: 1 February 1985; Label: CBS; Formats: CD, LP, digital download, cassette | 6 | FIMI: Gold |
| Io | Released: 13 February 1988; Label: RCA; Formats: CD, LP, digital download, cassette | 25 | |
| Ufficialmente dispersi | Released: 16 March 1993; Label: CBS; Formats: CD, LP, digital download, cassette | 44 | |
| Un pettirosso da combattimento | Released: 1 February 1997; Label: Sony; Formats: CD, LP, digital download, cassette | 24 | |
| BabyBertè | Released: 9 September 2005; Label: Edel; Formats: CD, LP, digital download | 2 | FIMI: Gold |
| Amici non ne ho… ma amiche sì! | Released: 1 April 2016; Label: Warner; Formats: CD, LP, digital download | 2 | |
| LiBerté | Released: 28 September 2018; Label: Warner, Bandabebè, 23 Music Entertainment; Formats: CD, LP, digital download | 4 | FIMI: Gold |
| Manifesto | Released: 5 November 2021; Label: Warner; Formats: CD, LP, digital download | 8 | |

=== Live albums ===
List of live albums, with selected chart positions and certifications
| Title | Album details | Peak chart positions | Certifications |
| Title | Album details | ITA | Certifications |
|---|---|---|---|
| Bertex - Ingresso libero | Released: 26 April 1994; Label: Sony; Formats: CD, LP, digital download, cassette | 39 | |
| Decisamente Loredana | Released: 20 September 1998; Label: Sony; Formats: CD, LP, digital download, cassette | 19 | |
| Babybertè Live 2007 | Released: 2 March 2007; Label: Friends & Partners; Formats: CD, LP, digital download | 29 | |
| Bertilation | Released: 29 February 2008; Label: Edel; Formats: CD, digital download | 20 | |
| Amiche in arena | Released: 11 November 2016; Label: Friends & Partners; Formats: CD, digital download | 1 | FIMI: Gold |

=== Extended plays ===
List of EPs, with selected chart positions and certifications
| Title | Album details | Peak chart positions | Certifications |
| Title | Album details | ITA | Certifications |
|---|---|---|---|
| Dimmi che mi ami | Released: 8 March 2002; Label: B&G; Formats: CD, digital download | 7 | |
| Lola & Angiolina Project (with Ivana Spagna) | Released: 1 January 2009; Label: Edel; Formats: CD, digital download | 26 | |

=== Singles ===
==== As lead artist ====
List of singles, with chart positions and certifications, showing year released and album name
| Title | Year | Peak chart positions | | Certifications | Album |
| Title | Year | ITA | SWI | Certifications | Album |
|---|---|---|---|---|---|
| "Volevi un amore grande" | 1974 | — | — | | Streaking |
| "Sei bellissima" | 1975 | 9 | — | FIMI: Gold | Normale o super |
| "Meglio libera" | 1976 | 23 | — | | Normale o super |
| "Fiabe" | 1977 | 24 | — | | Non-album single |
| "Grida" | 1977 | 16 | — | | T.I.R. |
| "Dedicato" | 1978 | 5 | — | | Bandabertè |
| "E la luna bussò" | 1979 | 6 | — | FIMI: Gold | Bandabertè |
| "In alto mare" | 1980 | 11 | — | FIMI: Gold | Loredana Bertè |
| "Movie" | 1981 | — | — | | Made in Italy |
| "Non sono una signora" | 1982 | 3 | — | FIMI: Platinum | Traslocando |
| "Per i tuoi occhi" | 1982 | 7 | — | | Traslocando |
| "Acqua" | 1985 | 13 | — | | Carioca |
| "Re" | 1986 | 15 | — | | Fotografando… i miei successi |
| "Io" | 1988 | 16 | — | | Io |
| "In questa città" | 1991 | 26 | — | | Best |
| "Stiamo come stiamo" (with Mia Martini) | 1993 | — | — | | Ufficialmente dispersi |
| "Amici non ne ho" | 1994 | 19 | — | | Bertex - Ingresso libero |
| "Portami con te" | 1998 | — | — | | Decisamente Loredana |
| "Dimmi che mi ami" | 2002 | 7 | — | | Dimmi che mi ami |
| "Strade di fuoco" | 2006 | 3 | — | | Babybertè |
| "Musica e parole" (solo or with Ivana Spagna) | 2008 | 20 | — | | Bertilation |
| "Respirare" (with Gigi D'Alessio) | 2012 | 11 | — | | Chiaro |
| "Ma quale musica leggera" | 2012 | — | — | | Non-album single |
| "È andata così" | 2016 | — | — | | Amici non ne ho… ma amiche sì! |
| "Non ti dico no" (with Boomdabash) | 2018 | 8 | — | FIMI: 2x Platinum | Barracuda and LiBerté |
| "Maledetto luna-park" | 2018 | — | — | | LiBerté |
| "Babilonia" | 2018 | — | — | | LiBerté |
| "Cosa ti aspetti da me" | 2019 | 6 | 64 | FIMI: Platinum | LiBerté |
| "Tequila e San Miguel" | 2019 | 88 | — | | Non-album single |
| "Figlia di" | 2021 | 62 | — | | Manifesto |
| "Che sogno incredibile" (with Emma) | 2021 | 71 | — | FIMI: Gold | Non-album single |
| "Bollywood" | 2021 | — | — | | Manifesto |
| "Mare malinconia" (with Franco126) | 2022 | — | — | | Manifesto |
| "Pazza" | 2024 | 8 | 66 | FIMI: Platinum | Ribelle |
| "Bestiale" (with Eiffel 65) | 2024 | — | — | | Non-album single |
| "Una stupida scusa" (with Boomdabash) | 2025 | 73 | — | | Non-album single |

==== As featured artist ====
List of singles, with chart positions and certifications, showing year released and album name
| Title | Year | Peak chart positions | Certifications | Album |
| Title | Year | ITA | Certifications | Album |
|---|---|---|---|---|
| "Sara perchè ti amo (chissenefrega)" (Ricchi e Poveri featuring Loredana Bertè) | 2004 | 15 | | Non-album single |
| "Cattiva" (Loredana Errore featuring Loredana Bertè) | 2011 | 38 | | Cattiva |
| "Senza pensieri" (Fabio Rovazzi featuring Loredana Bertè and J-Ax) | 2019 | 22 | FIMI: Platinum | Non-album single |
| "Tuttapposto" (Giordana Angi featuring Loredana Bertè) | 2021 | — | | Mi muovo |

=== Guest appearances ===
| Title | Year | Other artist(s) | Album |
|---|---|---|---|
| "Gingi" | 1971 | Pippo Baudo | Gingi |
| "Brucia il paradiso" | 1975 | Fausto Leali | Amore dolce, amore amaro, amore mio |
| "Sound" | 1976 | Alberto Radius | Che cosa sei |
| "Popstar" | 1976 | Alberto Radius | Che cosa sei |
| "Sono donna" | 1977 | Fausto Leali | Leapoli |
| "Se rinasco" | 1984 | Mario Lavezzi and Fiorella Mannoia | Guardandoti, sfiorandoti |
| "Il mio mondo" | 1985 | Umberto Bindi | Bindi |
| "Tu no" | 1986 | Red Canzian | Io e Red |
| "Notte d'amore" | 1987 | Fausto Leali | Io amo e altri successi |
| "Smog & Stress" | 1992 | Enzo Gragnaniello | Veleno, mare e ammore |
| "E la luna bussò" | 1994 | Fratelli di Soledad | Salviamo il salvabile |
| "E la luna bussò" | 1997 | Francesca Alotta | Buonanotte alla luna |
| "Si può dare di più" | 1998 | Antonella Bucci and Mara Venier | InnaMorandi |
| "Non ho che te" | 1998 | Giovanni Danieli | Disincanto |
| "Una storia sbagliata" | 2003 | None | Faber, amico fragile |
| "A me piace" | 2004 | Andrea Maja | Andrea Maja |
| "In alto mare" | 2004 | Mario Lavezzi | Passionalità |
| "Una città per cantare" | 2005 | Ron | Ma quando dici amore |
| "Pensiero stupido" | 2005 | Dolcenera | Un mondo perfetto (Special Edition) |
| "E la luna bussò" | 2010 | Neri per Caso | Donne |
| "Malala" | 2016 | Ron | La forza di dire sì |
| "Allegria" | 2017 | J-Ax and Fedez | Comunisti col Rolex |
| "Occhi di gatto" | 2017 | Cristina D'Avena | Duets |
| "La tua ragazza sempre" | 2019 | Irene Grandi | Grandissimo |
| "Mi rubi l'anima" | 2023 | Marcella Bella | Etna |

== Filmography ==
=== Films ===
| Title | Year | Role(s) | Notes |
|---|---|---|---|
| Basta guardarla | 1970 | Red dancer | Uncredited |
| Quelli belli… siamo noi | 1970 | Silvia | |
| The Boss and the Worker | 1975 | Mariagrazia Marigotti | |
| Eye of the Cat | 1975 | Prostitute | Cameo appearance |
| Movie Rush - La febbre del cinema | 1976 | Martine | |
| The Story of Piera | 1983 | Herself | Cameo appearance |
| Un altro giorno ancora | 1995 | Performer | With the song "Amici non ne ho" |
| Io sono Mia | 2019 | None | Consultant writer |
| The Addams Family | 2019 | Grandmama Addams | Italian voice-over role |
| Addio al nubilato | 2021 | Herself | Cameo appearance |
| The Addams Family 2 | 2021 | Grandmama Addams | Italian voice-over role |
| Positivə | 2021 | Herself | Documentary |
| Still Out of My League | 2021 | Delfina Meier | |

=== Television ===
| Title | Year | Role(s) | Notes |
|---|---|---|---|
| No, No, Nanette | 1974 | Pauline | Television movie |
| Orfeo 9 | 1975 | Narrator (voice) | Television movie |
| Bambole, non c'è una lira | 1977 | Dori | Variety show |
| Fantastico | 1984–1985 | Herself / Performer | Musical/variety program (season 5) |
| Risatissima | 1985 | Herself / Performer | Variety show (season 2) |
| Sanremo Music Festival 1986 | 1986 | Herself / Contestant | Performing "Re" (9th place) |
| Non necessariamente | 1986–1987 | Herself / co-host | Variety show |
| Sanremo Music Festival 1988 | 1988 | Herself / Contestant | Performing "Io" (16th place) |
| Sanremo Music Festival 1991 | 1991 | Herself / Contestant | Performing "In questa città" (18th place) |
| Sanremo Music Festival 1993 | 1993 | Herself / Contestant | Performing "Stiamo come stiamo" with Mia Martini (14th place) |
| Sanremo Music Festival 1994 | 1994 | Herself / Contestant | Performing "Amici non ne ho" (13th place) |
| Domenica in | 1994–1997 | Herself / Recurring guest | Talk show (seasons 19–21) |
| Sanremo Music Festival 1995 | 1995 | Herself / Contestant | Performing "Angeli & Angeli" (19th place) |
| Sanremo Music Festival 1997 | 1997 | Herself / Contestant | Performing "Luna" (20th place) |
| La notte vola | 2001 | Herself / Contestant | Talent show |
| Sanremo Music Festival 2002 | 2002 | Herself / Contestant | Performing "Dimmi che mi ami" (17th place) |
| Music Farm | 2005–2006 | Herself / Judge | Talent show (seasons 2–3) |
| Sanremo Music Festival 2008 | 2008 | Herself / Contestant | Performing "Musica e parole" (disqualified) |
| X Factor | 2008–2009 | Herself / Performer | Talent show |
| Sanremo Music Festival 2012 | 2012 | Herself / Contestant | Performing "Respirare" with Gigi D'Alessio (4th place) |
| Amici di Maria De Filippi | 2015–2020 | Herself / Judge | Talent show (seasons 14–15, 18–19) |
| Standing Ovation | 2017 | Herself / Judge | Talent show |
| Sanremo Music Festival 2019 | 2019 | Herself / Contestant | Performing "Cosa ti aspetti da me" (4th place) |
| The Voice Senior | 2020–present | Herself / Coach | Talent show |
| Non sono una signora - Loredana 70 | 2021 | Herself / Headliner | Special |
| The Voice Kids | 2023 | Herself / Coach | Children's competition |
| Sanremo Music Festival 2024 | 2024 | Herself / Contestant | Performing "Pazza" (7th place) |
| Una voce per San Marino 2024 | 2024 | Herself / Contestant | Performing "Pazza" (2nd Place) |

=== Stage ===
| Title | Year | Role(s) | Theatre |
|---|---|---|---|
| Hair | 1970 | Jeanie | Teatro Sistina |
| Ciao Rudy | 1972 | The Fan | Teatro Sistina |
| Gerusalemme | 2001 | Performer | Teatro dell'Opera |
