= Upon This Dawning =

Italian metalcore band

- Origin: Brescia, Italy
- Genres: Metalcore, post-hardcore, screamo, electronicore, deathcore (later)
- Years active: 2007—2016
- Labels: Artery, Fearless
- Past members: Daniele Nelli; Matteo Botticini; Matteo Leone; Giovanni Cilio; Matteo Bertizzolo; Nicola Giachellich; Luca Orio; Gianluca Molinari; Carlo Todeschini; Andrea Moserle; Gabriele Magrini; Chris Deets
- Website: www.myspace.com/uponthisdawning

Upon This Dawning was an Italian metalcore band from Brescia, founded in 2007. They have released one EP and three studio albums. Their final album We Are All Sinners was released in April 2014.

== History ==
The group was founded in Brescia, Italy in 2007. They released their debut EP, Count the Seconds Before Your Last Breath, through Slake-less Heart Records. They also released their debut album, On Your Glory We Build Our Empire, in August 2009.

Due to their rapid success and a steadily growing fan base, prompted in part because of concerts with bands like Asking Alexandria, Underoath, Motionless in White, Blessthefall, Pierce the Veil, More Than A Thousand, Adam Kills Eve, Dance Gavin Dance, and In Fear and Faith, the American management company The Artery Foundation (including Chelsea Grin, Whitechapel, Woe, Is Me, Impending Doom, Breathe Carolina) became aware of the band and signed a management contract with them.

The group toured several times in Italy between March 7, 2009, to 30 May 2009 and between 29 January 2011 to 28 May 2011. The band has also played concerts with: The Electric Diorama, Romantic Emily, Hope, The Burden, One Morning Left, From Dying Skies, Ms. White, Shadows Chasing Ghosts and While She Sleeps. With Adam Kills Eve, the group played their first concert outside Italy in the Swiss town of Bellinzona. In 2010, Matteo Bertizzolo and Nicola Giachellich left Upon This Dawning, Giani Molinari moves from bass to vocals, Andrea Moserle on keyboard, Matteo Leone on bass and Carlo Todeschini on guitar join the group.

Meanwhile, toured the group in Munich, Germany with His Statue Falls.

Their second album, To Keep Us Safe, was released on October 23, 2012, through Fearless Records. The album included Chris Motionless, and a cover of the song "Call Me Maybe", originally recorded by Carly Rae Jepsen, which also appears on the fifth installment of the Fearless Punk Goes Pop series. The group toured more often after signing with Fearless Records. The band was the opening act for For the Fallen Dreams, Alesana, The Color Morale, and Chunk! No, Captain Chunk!. In June 2013, Unclean vocalist, Giani Molinari left Upon This Dawning, along with Luca Orio, Carlo Todeschini, and Andrea Moserle. Giani was replaced by Dani Nelli, and Luca was replaced by Gabriele Magrini, who was then replaced by Chris Deets in 2014. Deets quit the band abruptly in April 2015, due to a dispute between him and other members, causing the band to miss the first three dates in The IX Lives Tour with Ice Nine Kills. Deets was replaced by Giovanni Cilio.

Between 22 November 2013 and 11 December 2013, the group toured together with Shoot the Girl First as the opening act for The Browning throughout Europe. They toured throughout the United Kingdom, the Netherlands and Switzerland, Italy, Germany, Belgium, Austria and Hungary. On February 11, 2014, Upon This Dawning stated that they had left Fearless Records and instead, signed to Artery Recordings. The band announced their third studio album, We Are All Sinners, which was released on April 29, 2014. We Are All Sinners had more influences of doom metal, death metal, and black metal, featuring tremolo picking, harmonic key writing, and themes of sin and hell.

Since the end of 2016 the band has been in pause due to Dani Nelli and Teo Botticini choosing to focus on a trap career with their duo Danien & Theø. In 2020, two years after Danien & Theø's debut album "La Dolce Vita" released, the duo separated and Theø started his own emo-punk project called La Sad with the Italian colleagues Fiks and Plant, with Danien who occasionally works on the production of their instrumentals.

== Members ==
Final lineup

- Daniele "Dani" Nelli – lead vocals (2013–2016)
- Matteo "Theø" Botticini – clean vocals, rhythm guitar (2010–2016), lead guitar (2006–2010, 2014–2016), additional unclean vocals (2006–2013)
- Matteo "Matt" Leone – bass (2010–2016)
- Giovanni Cilio – drums (2015–2016)

Former

- Matteo Bertizzolo – unclean vocals (2006–2010)
- Nicola Giachellich – clean vocals, rhythm guitar (2006–2010)
- Luca "Accio" Orio – drums (2006–2013)
- Gianluca "Giani" Molinari – lead vocals (2010–2013), bass, additional unclean vocals (2006–2010)
- Carlo Todeschini – lead guitar (2010–2014)
- Andrea "Mose" Moserle – keyboards, programming, additional unclean vocals (2010–2014)
- Gabriele Magrini – drums (2013–2014)
- Chris Deets – drums (2014–2015)

Timeline

== Discography ==
=== EPs ===
- Count the Seconds Before Your Last Breath (2007, Slake-less Heart Records)

=== Albums ===
- On Your Glory We Build Our Empire (2009, Slake-less Heart Records)
- To Keep Us Safe (2012, Fearless Records; Produced by Drew Fulk)
- We Are All Sinners (2014, Artery Records; Produced by Daniele Nelli)

=== Other appearances ===
- Punk Goes Pop Volume 5 (2012, Fearless Records) contributed their cover of "Call Me Maybe" (originally by Carly Rae Jepsen)

=== Singles ===
- "Of Human Action" (2011)
- "A New Beginning" (feat. Chris Motionless) (2012)
- "Call Me Maybe (Carly Rae Jepsen Cover)" (Appears on the compilation Punk Goes Pop 5)
- "Nothing Lasts Forever" (2012)
- "Obey" (2014)
- "Anima" (2014)
- "Embrace the Evil" (2014)

=== Music videos ===
- Of Human Action (director: Enrico Tomei. In the Studios of Velocity Records, Rise Records vom MsWhite-Musiker Andrea Fusini gemastert)
- A New Beginning
- Embrace the Evil (director: Jeremy Tremp, producer: Shan Dan)
