= Cosa ti aspetti da me =

2019 single by Lorendana Bertè

Single by Loredana Bertè

from the album LiBerté (Sanremo Edition)
- Language: Italian
- Released: 6 February 2019
- Genre: Pop rock
- Length: 3:44
- Label: Warner
- Songwriters: Gaetano Curreri; Piero Romitelli; Gerardo Pulli

Loredana Bertè singles chronology
"Babilonia" (2018)	"Cosa ti aspetti da me" (2019)	"Tequila e San Miguel" (2019)

Music video
- "Cosa ti aspetti da me" on YouTube

"Cosa ti aspetti da me" (transl. "What do you expect from me") is a song recorded by Italian singer Loredana Bertè. It was released on 6 February 2019 through Warner Records and included in the deluxe edition of her sixteenth studio album LiBerté.

The song served as the artist's entry for the 2019 edition of the Sanremo Music Festival, where it placed fourth. It reached the second place in the Italian Airplay Chart, behind Mahmood's "Soldi", and was the 54th most played song in Italian radio stations in 2019.

== Charts ==
Chart (2019)	Peak position
Italy (FIMI)	6
Italy Airplay (EarOne)	2
Switzerland (Schweizer Hitparade)	64

== Certifications ==
Region	Certification	Certified units/sales
Italy (FIMI)	Platinum	50,000^{‡}
^{‡} Sales+streaming figures based on certification alone.
