= Naska (singer) =

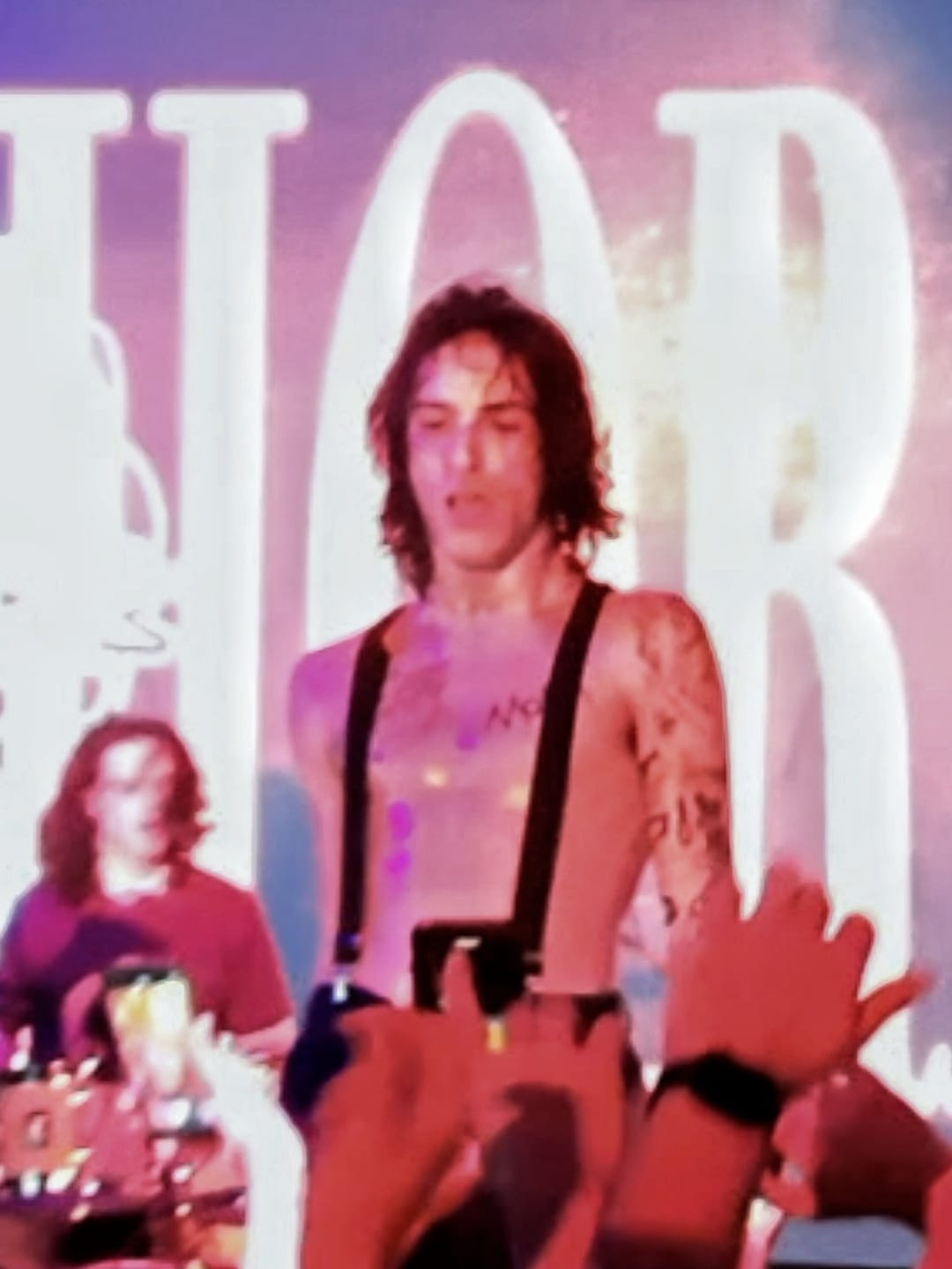
- Naska during a concert in April 2022

Background information
- Born: Diego Caterbetti; July 15, 1997 (age 29); Loreto, Marche, Italy
- Genres: Pop punk; punk rock; emo rap
- Occupation: Singer-songwriter
- Years active: 2014–present
- Labels: Yalla Movement; Sony Music; Thamsanqa

Diego Caterbetti (born 15 July 1997), known professionally as Naska, is an Italian singer-songwriter.

== Biography ==
Naska was born on 15 July 1997 in Loreto in the region of Marche, and grew up in Monte San Giusto. He became interested in music during secondary school. After finishing school he moved to Milan to pursue music and socialise.

== Career ==
=== Debut in the rap scene (2014–2020) ===
He started his career by publishing his first work in 2014 on YouTube.

He made his debut with the EP The Purge, produced by DOD.

In 2017 he released his first official single, entitled "X Season", which he followed with another, named "Art Attack Freestyle".

In 2018 he released two singles Jake La Furia's label Yalla Movement — "Xanny" and "Dormi", which he followed up with "Non fidarti, Tu che ne sai" (in collaboration with rapper Zoda) and "California", ahead of the EP Alo/Ve, which was released on 6 March 2020.

=== Movement to pop punk (2020-present) ===
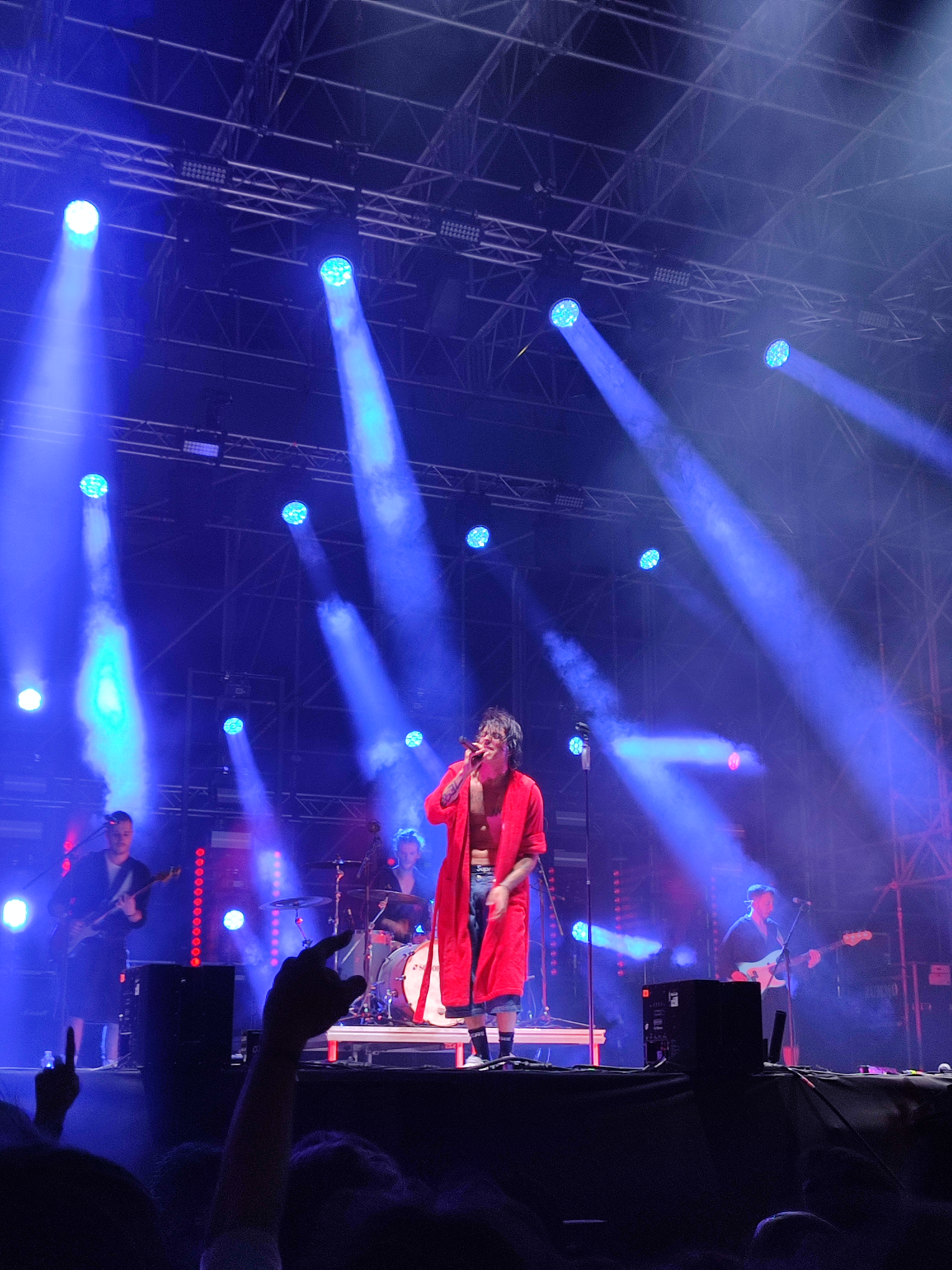
Diego Naska at Slam Dunk Italy 2023

Later in 2020 he released the single "Settembre" together with xDiemondx; with the sound of the song veering towards pop punk, something he would continue to explore later. Over the course of 2021 he released the singles "Mamma non mi parla", "Spezzami il cuore" and "Punkabbestia", ahead of his debut studio album on 4 March 2022 — Rebel, which he followed up with the Rebel Tour. The album is made up of ten tracks produced by Renzo Stone and Andrea Bonomo. It made its debut at 22nd place on the Classifica FIMI Album Chart.

Following this, he played at various festivals, including Rock in Roma and Mi Ami Festival, as well as opening for Fast Animals and Slow Kids at their Carroponte di Sesto San Giovanni concert, together with Panetty and La Superluna di Drone Kong. In september a deluxe version of the album was published, containing two demos and acoustic versions of two other songs.

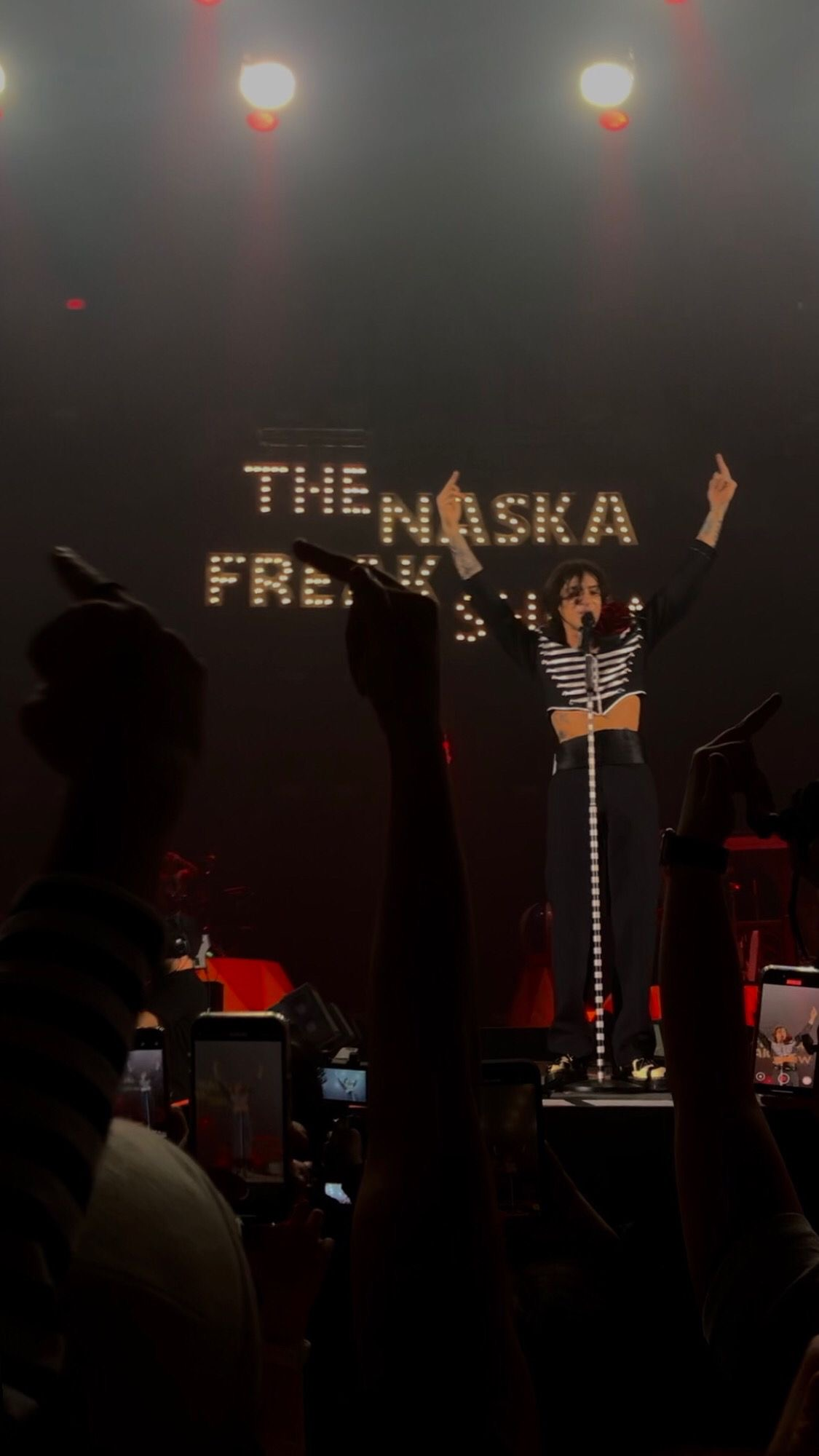
Diego Naska at the Forum di Assago during the Freak Show Tour

On 18 January 2023 he announced the Rebel Unplugged Tour, formed of acoustic shows. Additionally, he collaborated with Lo Stato Sociale on the single "Che benessere!?", which was released on 20 January 2023. On 17 February the single "Porno" by Finley, was released, which featured a collaboration with Naska. In April, Rolling Stone featured Naska in their list of "artists who could make a difference this year". On 5 May 2023, he released his second album, La mia stanza.

In summer he announced his Summer Tour 2023, which included participation in festivals such as Mi Ami in Milano and Rock in Roma. On 1 June Naska performed at the pre-show at Slam Dunk Italy at Bellaria-Igea Marina, opening for Sum 41 together with Zebrahead, Stand Atlantic and Monday Proof. On 16 June the single "Summersad 4" in collaboration with the group La Sad (Theø, Fiks e Plant) was released. The deluxe version of La mia stanza, containing two demo songs, an acoustic track and a remix came out on 29 September.

On 11 October, his third album, The Freak Show, which included previously released tracks "Baby Don't Cry" and "Berlino" with Gemitaiz and Greg Willen was released. On 7 December he performed at the Forum d'Assago for the first time.

In February 2025 he covered the song "Guarda che Luna" by singer-songwriter Fred Buscaglione, and on 7 March he released the single "Milano". The two tracks were a preview of the EP Milanconia, released on 21 March. On March 28, he performed in the United Kingdom for the first time, playing at Dingwalls in Camden, London.

== Musical style and influence ==
Naska grew up with the pop punk and punk rock scene of blink-182, Sum 41 and Green Day, and then became passionate about American emo trap captained by the likes of Lil Peep, and was influenced by what he found in his music. He also listened to Nirvana, Radiohead and The Strokes.

His style, from his debut single to first EP Alo/Ve, favours emo rap, but he more decisively moves to a pop punk style with Rebel and La mia stanza.

== Discography ==
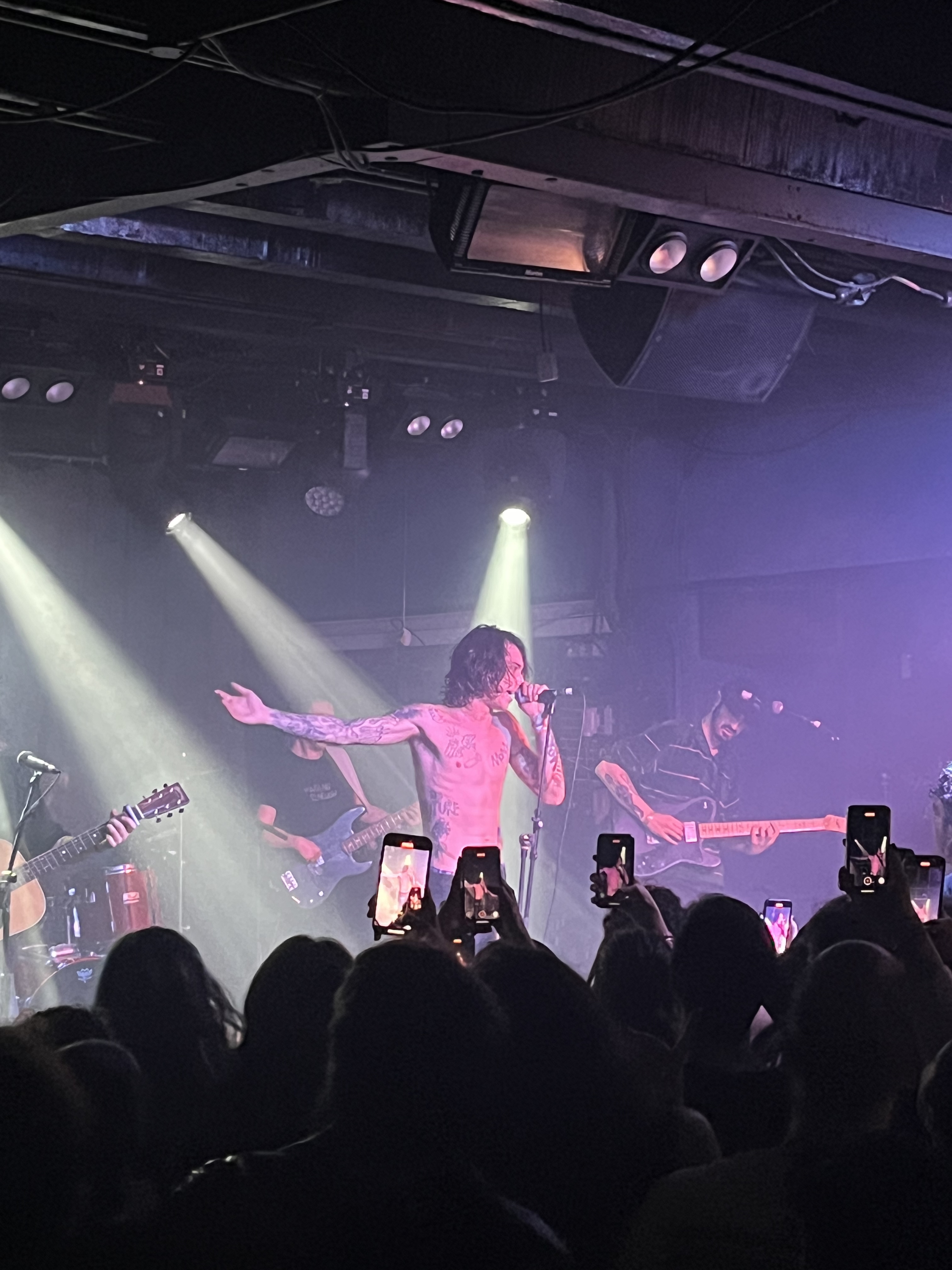
Naska performing at Dingwalls in Camden

=== Studio albums ===
- 2022 – 3 centesimi
- 2023 – La mia stanza
- 2024 – The Freak Show

=== EP ===
- 2020 – Alo/Ve
- 2025 – Milanconia

=== Singles ===
==== As main artist ====
- 2017 – X-Season
- 2017 – Art Attack Freestyle (feat. Chfnik)
- 2018 – Xanny
- 2018 – Dormi
- 2019 – Non fidarti
- 2019 – Tu che ne sai (feat. Zoda)
- 2019 – California
- 2020 – Settembre (feat. xDiemondx)
- 2021 – Mamma non mi parla
- 2021 – tovaglia di legno
- 2021 – Punkabbestia
- 2022 – O mi uccidi
- 2023 – Cattiva
- 2023 – A testa in giù
- 2024 – Baby Don't Cry
- 2024 – Berlino (feat. Greg Willen and Gemitaiz)
- 2025 – 1 euro (cover of Fred Buscaglione)
- 2025 – che amore l'amore

==== As guest artist ====
- 2023 – Che benessere!? (Lo Stato Sociale feat. Naska)
- 2023 – Porno (Finley feat. Naska)
- 2023 – Summersad 4 (La Sad feat. Naska)
- 2024 – FantaSanremo - Official Anthem 2024 (FantaSanremo feat. Naska)

=== Collaborations ===
- 2019 – Yolown (Zoda feat. Naska), by Ufo
- 2024 – Gin Tonic (MadMan feat. Naska), by Lonewolf

== Tour ==
- Rebel Summer Tour (2022)
- Rebel Unplugged (2023)
- Summer Tour (2023)
- Summer Tour (2024)
- The Freak Show, Unipol Forum (2024)
- Tour nei teatri Unplugged (2025)
