= Casa mia =

2024 single by Ghali

Single by Ghali
- Released: 7 February 2024
- Genre: Dance pop
- Length: 3:30
- Label: Sto; Warner
- Producer: Michelangelo

Ghali singles chronology
"Baba" (2023)	"Casa mia" (2024)	"Kiss Kiss" (2024)

Music video
- "Casa mia" on YouTube

"Casa mia" (transl. "My home") is a song by Italian rapper Ghali. It was produced by Michelangelo, and released on 7 February 2024.

The song was Ghali's entry for the Sanremo Music Festival 2024, the 74th edition of Italy's musical festival which doubles also as a selection of the act for the Eurovision Song Contest, where it placed fourth in the grand final.

== Anti-Israeli allegations ==
After its first performance at the Sanremo Festival, the song was attacked by the head of the Milan Jewish community for its lyrical content (referencing hospital bombings), accusing him of "anti-Israeli propaganda" in the context of the Gaza war and requesting that host broadcaster RAI intervene; the artist responded by clarifying that the song had been written before the October 7 attacks but that he felt the duty to "take a stance" and "shed light on what [some] pretend not to see".

== Music video ==
A music video to accompany the release of "Casa mia", directed by Lorenzo Sorbini, was first released onto YouTube on 7 February 2024. Featuring an alien "halfway between a hippo and a dugong", the video has been described by Alessio Rosa on Videoclip Italia as "a fun jam session on a golf course".

== Charts ==
=== Weekly charts ===
Weekly chart performance for "Casa mia"
Chart (2024)	Peak position
Italy (FIMI)	5
Italy Airplay (EarOne)	3
Switzerland (Schweizer Hitparade)	25

=== Year-end charts ===
2024 year-end chart performance for "Casa mia"
Chart (2024)	Position
Italy (FIMI)	11

== Certifications ==
Certifications for "Casa mia"
Region	Certification	Certified units/sales
Italy (FIMI)	3× Platinum	300,000^{‡}
^{‡} Sales+streaming figures based on certification alone.
