= Finiscimi =

- Official cover

Single by Sangiovanni
- Released: 7 February 2024
- Length: 3:11
- Label: Sugar Music; Universal
- Songwriter(s): Sangiovanni; Pietro Milano; Fabio Campedelli; Andrea "Sixpm" Ferrara; Federico Vaccari
- Producer(s): Sixpm; 2nd Roof

Sangiovanni singles chronology
"Americana" (2023)	"Finiscimi" (2024)	"Luci allo xeno" (2025)

Music video
- "Finiscimi" on YouTube

"Finiscimi" (lit. 'Finish me') is a song by Italian singer Sangiovanni. It was released on 7 February 2024 by Sugar Music.

The song was Sangiovanni's entry for the Sanremo Music Festival 2024, the 74th edition of Italy's musical festival that doubles also as a selection of the act for the Eurovision Song Contest, where it placed 29th out of 30 in the grand final.

After the disappointing performance of the song at Sanremo, Sangiovanni announced that he would take a break from music. The release of the new album and the related concert event were also cancelled.

== Music video ==
The music video for "Finiscimi", directed by Byron Rosero, was released on the same day via Sangiovanni's YouTube channel.

== Charts ==
Chart (2024)	Peak position
Italy (FIMI)	28
Italy Airplay (EarOne)	60

== Certifications ==
Region	Certification	Certified units/sales
Italy (FIMI)	Gold	50,000^{‡}
^{‡} Sales+streaming figures based on certification alone.
