= Mr. Rain =

Italian singer and record producer (born 1991)

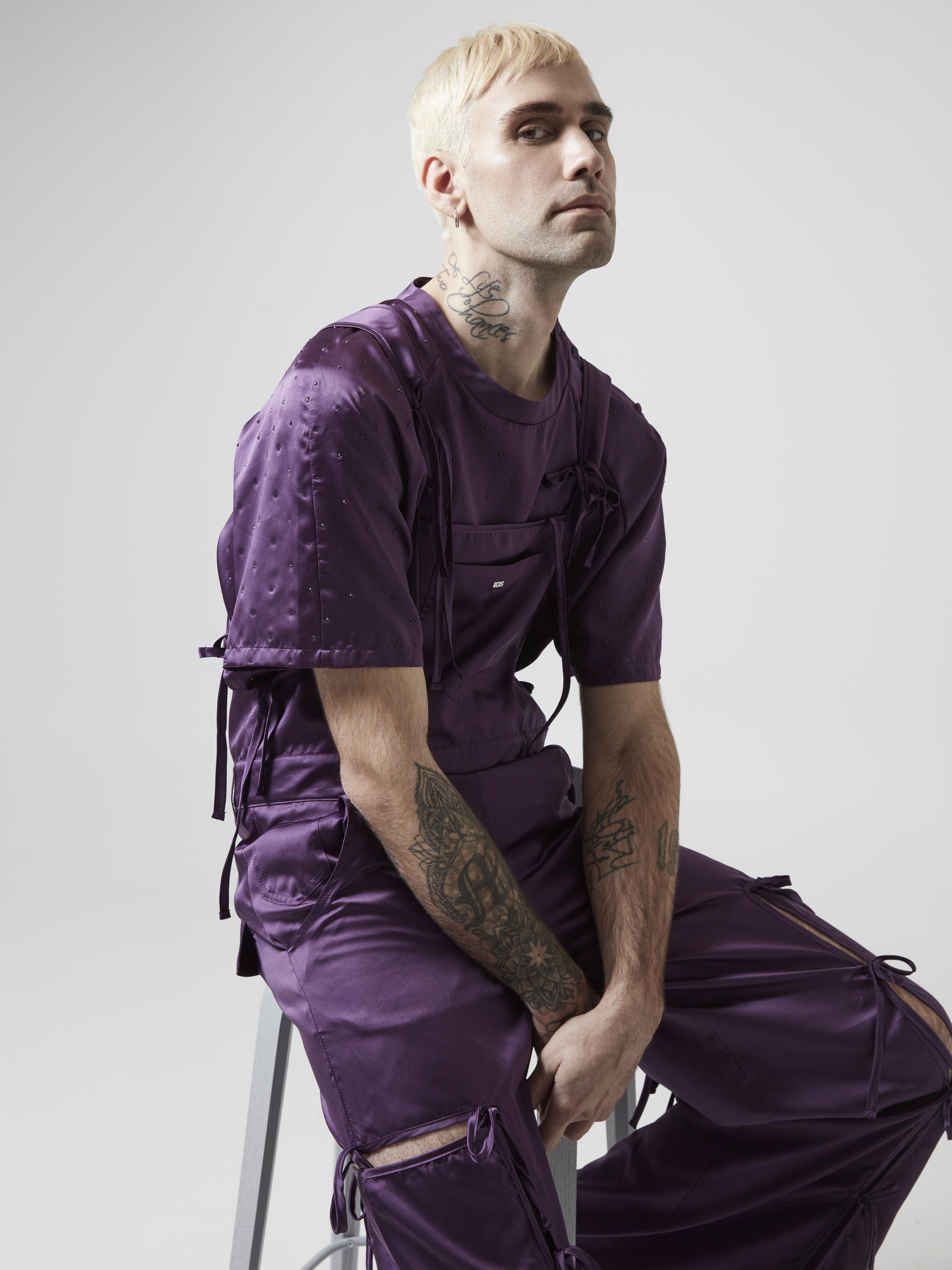
- Mr. Rain in 2023

Background information
- Born: Mattia Balardi; 19 November 1991 (age 34); Desenzano del Garda, Lombardy, Italy
- Genres: Pop rap
- Occupations: Singer; songwriter; rapper; record producer
- Instrument: Vocals
- Years active: 2011–present
- Labels: Atlantic Records; Warner Music Italy

Mattia Balardi (born 19 November 1991), known professionally as Mr. Rain, is an Italian singer, rapper and record producer.

== Biography ==
Balardi was born in Desenzano del Garda. His music career began in 2011, when he released his debut mixtape Time 2 Eat. In 2013, along with rapper Osso, he took part in the seventh season of the Italian talent X Factor Italia. They made it all the way to the Judges Houses stage, where they were eliminated. They were then chosen to compete in a final showdown for an extra spot in the live shows, but lost out to Roberta Pompa.

In January 2014 he embarked on his first tournées, performing in major Italian cities, while on 12 May 2015 he released his first album Memories, anticipated by the single "Tutto quello che ho". The album consists of sixteen tracks, including "Carillon", certified double platinum by FIMI in 2018. On June 2, 2016, the single '"Supereroe"' was released, certified as a gold.

On January 5, 2018, the single Ipernova was released, which anticipated the second album Butterfly Effect, released on the January 26. On September 21 of the same year, the album was reissued under the title Butterfly Effect 2.0, containing four bonus tracks and was promoted by a nationwide tournée.

On May 17, 2019, the single "La somma" was released, made with Italian singer Martina Attili, being certified gold. On March 13, 2020, the single "Fiori di Chernobyl", from the album Petrichor, was released, reaching the position 2 on the Top Singles chart.

On 4 December 2022, it was officially announced Mr. Rain participation in the Sanremo Music Festival 2023. "Supereroi" was later announced as his entry for the Sanremo Music Festival 2023. He finished in 3rd place.

Mr. Rain competed again in Sanremo in 2024, with the pop song "Due altalene".

== Discography ==
=== Studio albums ===
List of studio albums with album details
Title	Album details	Peak chart positions	Certifications
Title	Album details	ITA	Certifications
Memories	Released: 12 May 2015; Label: Independent	—	
Butterfly Effect	Released: 26 January 2018; Label: Atlantic Records	3	FIMI: Platinum
Petrichor	Released: 12 February 2021; Label: Atlantic Records, Warner Music Italy	5	FIMI: Platinum
Fragile	Released: 18 March 2022; Label: Atlantic Records, Warner Music Italy	17	
Pianeta di Miller	Released: 1 March 2024; Label: Warner Music Italy	2	FIMI: Platinum

=== Mixtape albums ===
List of mixtape albums with album details
Title	Mixtape details
Time 2 Eat	Released: 2011; Label: Independent

=== Singles ===
==== As lead artist ====
List of singles as lead artist, with selected chart positions, showing year released and album name
Title	Year	Peak chart positions		Certifications	Album
Title	Year	ITA	WW	Certifications	Album
"Tutto quello che ho"	2015	—	—	FIMI: Gold	Memories
'"Carillon"	2015	—	—	FIMI: 2× Platinum	Memories
"Supereroe"	2016	—	—	FIMI: Gold	Non-album single
"I grandi non piangono mai"	2017	61	—	FIMI: Platinum	Butterfly Effect
"The Way You Do" (featuring Valentina Tioli)	2017	—	—		Non-album single
"Grazie a me"	2017	—	—		Butterfly Effect
"Ti amo ma"	2017	—	—		Non-album single
"Rainbow Soda"	2017	—	—		Butterfly Effect
"Superstite" (featuring Osso)	2017	—	—		Butterfly Effect
"Ipernova"	2018	7	—	FIMI: 2× Platinum	Butterfly Effect
"Ops"	2018	33	—	FIMI: Platinum	Butterfly Effect
"La somma" (with Martina Attili)	2019	44	—	FIMI: Gold	Non-album single
"Fiori di Chernobyl"	2020	2	—	FIMI: 3× Platinum	Petrichor
"9.3"	2020	42	—	FIMI: Platinum	Petrichor
"Non c'è più musica" (featuring Birdy)	2021	71	—		Petrichor
"A forma di origami"	2021	97	—		Petrichor
"Meteoriti"	2021	46	—	FIMI: Platinum	Petrichor
"Crisalidi"	2022	—	—		Fragile
"Sincero"	2022	—	—		Fragile
"Supereroi"	2023	2	97	FIMI: 6× Platinum	Pianeta di Miller
"La fine del mondo" (with Sangiovanni)	2023	28	—	FIMI: 2× Platinum	Pianeta di Miller
"Un milione di notti" (with Clara)	2023	17	—	FIMI: Platinum	Pianeta di Miller
"Due altalene"	2024	10	—	FIMI: Platinum	Pianeta di Miller
"Paura del buio"	2024	—	—		Pianeta di Miller
"Pericolosa"	2024	—	—		Pianeta di Miller
"Odio a la Luna" (with Walls)	2025	—	—		TBA
"—" denotes singles that did not chart or were not released.

==== As featured artist ====
List of singles, with chart positions, album name and certifications
Title	Year	Peak chart positions	Certifications	Album
Title	Year	ITA	Certifications	Album
"Un domani" (Annalisa featuring Mr. Rain)	2018	36	FIMI: Platinum	Bye Bye
"Roma" (Maite Perroni featuring Mr. Rain)	2019	—		Non-album single
"Via di qua" (J-Ax featuring Mr. Rain)	2020	38	FIMI: Gold	SurreAle
"—" denotes singles that did not chart or were not released.
