= I p' me, tu p' te =

Single by Geolier

from the album Dio lo sa
- Language: Neapolitan; Italian
- Released: 7 February 2024
- Genre: Electropop; dance; urban; house
- Length: 3:07
- Label: Warner
- Songwriters: Emanuele Palumbo; Paolo Antonacci; Davide Simonetta; Davide Totaro; Francesco D'Alessio; Gennaro Petito; Michele Zocca
- Producers: Michelangelo; Kekko D'Alessio

Geolier singles chronology
"Switch" (2024)	"I p' me, tu p' te" (2024)	"L'ultima poesia" (2024)

Music video
- "I p' me, tu p' te" on YouTube

"I p' me, tu p' te" (Neapolitan pronunciation: [ˈi pə mˈme ˈtu pə tˈte]; transl. "Me for myself, you for yourself") is a song by Italian rapper Geolier. It was written by Geolier with co-writing contribution by Paolo Antonacci, Davide Simonetta, Francesco D'Alessio, Gennaro Petito, Davide Totaro and Michelangelo, and released on 7 February 2024 as the lead single from his third studio album, Dio lo sa.

The song served as Geolier's entry for the Sanremo Music Festival 2024, the 74th edition of Italy's musical festival which doubles also as a selection of the act for the Eurovision Song Contest, where it won the public vote and finished in second place.

== Music video ==
A music video to accompany the release of "I p' me, tu p' te", directed by Davide Vicari, was first released onto YouTube on 7 February 2024.

== Charts ==
=== Weekly charts ===
Weekly chart performance for "I p' me, tu p' te"
Chart (2024)	Peak position
Global 200 (Billboard)	91
Italy (FIMI)	1
Italy Airplay (EarOne)	5
Switzerland (Schweizer Hitparade)	13

=== Year-end charts ===
2024 year-end chart performance for "I p' me, tu p' te"
Chart (2024)	Position
Italy (FIMI)	3

== Certifications ==
Certifications for "I p' me, tu p' te"
Region	Certification	Certified units/sales
Italy (FIMI)	4× Platinum	400,000^{‡}
^{‡} Sales+streaming figures based on certification alone.
