= Sanremo Music Festival 2024 =

Italian song contest (74th edition)

- Sanremo si ama

Dates and venue
- Semi-final 1: 6 February 2024
- Semi-final 2: 7 February 2024
- Semi-final 3: 8 February 2024
- Semi-final 4: 9 February 2024
- Final: 10 February 2024
- Venue: Teatro Ariston; Sanremo, Italy

Production
- Broadcaster: Radiotelevisione italiana (RAI)
- Director: Stefano Vicario
- Musical director: Leonardo De Amicis
- Artistic director: Amadeus
- Presenters: Amadeus and Marco Mengoni (first night) Giorgia (second night) Teresa Mannino (third night) Lorella Cuccarini (fourth night) Rosario Fiorello (fifth night)

Vote
- Voting system: Televote, press jury and radio jury

Big Artists section
- Number of entries: 30
- Winner: "La noia" Angelina Mango

The Sanremo Music Festival 2024 (Italian: Festival di Sanremo 2024), officially the 74th Italian Song Festival (74º Festival della canzone italiana), was the 74th edition of the annual Sanremo Music Festival, a television song contest held at the Teatro Ariston of Sanremo, organised and broadcast by Radiotelevisione italiana (RAI). It was held between 6 and 10 February 2024, and presented for the fifth and final time in a row by Amadeus, who also served as the artistic director for the competition. The festival was won by Angelina Mango with "La noia", earning her the right to represent Italy in the Eurovision Song Contest 2024.

== Format ==
The 2024 edition of the Sanremo Music Festival took place at the Teatro Ariston in Sanremo, Liguria, organised by the Italian public broadcaster RAI. The artistic director and the presenter for the competition was Amadeus, for the fifth and final consecutive year.

=== Presenters ===
On 24 March 2022, a month after the final of the 2022 edition, RAI officially confirmed Amadeus as the presenter of the 73rd and 74th editions of the Sanremo Music Festival, announcing in June 2023 that this would be his last time hosting the event. Each of the nights of the festival was co-hosted, respectively, by: Marco Mengoni, the winner of the previous edition, who additionally performed his 2013 and 2023 winning entries "L'essenziale" and "Due vite" as well as other songs from his repertoire; Giorgia, who additionally performed her breakthrough song "E poi" and her 1995 winning entry "Come saprei", as well as other songs from her repertoire; Teresa Mannino; Lorella Cuccarini; and Rosario Fiorello, who was originally meant to be a guest on that night. The competing entries on each of the second and third nights were also introduced by the non-competing artists alongside the hosts.

In addition, PrimaFestival, the introductory segment aired before each of the nights and during the opening red carpet, was hosted by Paola & Chiara, Mattia Stanga and Daniele Cabras.

=== Format changes ===
On 19 June 2023, Amadeus announced to have proposed changes in the rules of the contest, as well as in the organisation of the traditional five evening shows. The complete rules were published on 10 July.

Changes affected the number of the entries (increased from 28 to 30), the arrangement of the five shows (with the first night being organised as the third night of previous editions), the cover performance show (which was opened to songs from any time and place) and the jury system (as explained below).

=== Voting ===
Voting occurred again through the combination of three methods:

- Public televoting, carried out via landline and mobile phone.
- Jury of the press room, TV and web.
- Jury of the radio, detached from the second one and replacing the demoscopic jury from previous editions.

Their voting was articulated as follows:

- First night: all of the entrants were judged by the jury of the press room, TV and web.
- Second night: half of the entrants were judged through a 50/50 split system by means of televoting and the jury of the radio.
- Third night: the other half of the entrants were judged through a 50/50 split system by means of televoting and the jury of the radio.
- Fourth night: the covers were judged through a split system by means of the televoting (34%) and the two juries (33% each). The results obtained on each evening that far were then combined.
- Fifth night: as in previous years, the entrants were judged by televoting alone, to be added up to the results obtained that far; ultimately, a final voting round (again a sum of televoting at 34% and the two juries at 33% each) was held among the top five, which determined the winner.

For the first time, only the top five entries in each of the first four nights' partial rankings were revealed during the show, and only the complete ranking before and after the final was made public.

== Selections ==
=== Sanremo Giovani 2023 ===
For the third time in a row, the Newcomers' section was not included in the Festival, with the Sanremo Giovani selection directly decreeing three places reserved in the Big Artists' section. The twelve artists competing in the format were selected through two separate contests: standard section and Area Sanremo.

==== Standard selection ====
Online submissions for the standard selection were open between 15 June and 19 October 2023. On 27 October 2023, it was announced that 564 acts had applied, 49 of which were selected at a listening session by a musical committee – composed of Federica Lentini, Massimo Martelli and Leonardo De Amicis, and chaired by the artistic director (Amadeus) – to proceed to a live audition in Rome on 10 November; there, a total of eight Sanremo Giovani finalists were selected. Their songs were released on 18 November 2023.

Selected entries
Artist	Song	Songwriter(s)
Bnkr44	"Effetti speciali"	Andrea Locci; Daniele Belli; Dario Lombardi; Duccio Caponi; Marco Vittiglio; Pietro Serafini
Clara	"Boulevard"	Clara Soccini; Daniele Magro
Grenbaud	"Mama"	Simone Buratti
Jacopo Sol	"Cose che non sai"	Carloalberto Russo; Jacopo Pio Porporino; Nicola Lazzarin; Vincenzo De Nicola
Lor3n	"Fiore d'inverno"	Lorenzo Iavagnilio
Santi Francesi	"Occhi tristi"	Alessandro De Santis; Antonio Filippelli; Cecilia Del Bono; Mario Lorenzo Francese
Tancredi	"Perle"	Alessandro Antonini; Giordano Colombo; Tancredi Cantù Rajnoldi
Vale LP	"Stronza"	Andrea Bonomo; Mario Cianchi; Simone Guzzino; Valentina Sanseverino

==== Area Sanremo 2023 ====
The rules of the Area Sanremo selection, organised by the Municipality of Sanremo alongside the Sanremo Symphonic Orchestra Foundation, were released on 10 October 2023, with the opening of an online application platform lasting until 30 October 2023. Artists aged between 16 and 30 were eligible to compete. The 772 submitting acts were auditioned by a musical committee – composed of Alessio De Stefani, Lavinia Iannarilli, Paolo Biamonte and Sergio Rubino, and chaired by the artistic director (Amadeus) – between 4 and 24 November 2023 at the Sanremo Palafiori, with around fifty qualifiers from this phase attending a final round on 25 and 26 November 2023; there, twenty winners were proclaimed among whom a total of four Sanremo Giovani finalists were selected. Their songs were released on 1 December 2023.

Selected entries
Artist	Song	Songwriters
Dipinto	"Criminali"	Armando Di Pinto; Rosario Castagnola; Sarah Tartuffo
Fellow	"Alieno"	Federico Castello; Leonardo Zaccaria; Michele Canova Iorfida
Nausica	"Favole"	Alessandro Canini; Carlo Avarello; Carlotta Foddanu; Emanuele Bertelli; Giordana Petralia
Omini	"Mare forza 9oi"	Francesco Roccati; Giovanni Pastorino; Michele Bitossi

==== Final ====
The final of Sanremo Giovani was held on 19 December 2023 at the Sanremo Casino Theatre, presented by Amadeus and broadcast on Rai 1 and Rai Radio 2, as well as on the broadcaster's online platform RaiPlay. The ranking was determined by a 50/50 combination of votes from the musical committee and the artistic director (Amadeus); the resulting top three artists were selected to compete in the Big Artists' section.

R/O	Artist	Song	Result
1	Grenbaud	"Mama"	Not selected
2	Clara	"Boulevard"	Winner
3	Bnkr44	"Effetti speciali"	Selected
4	Lor3n	"Fiore d'inverno"	Not selected
5	Nausica	"Favole"	Not selected
6	Dipinto	"Criminali"	Not selected
7	Santi Francesi	"Occhi tristi"	Selected
8	Tancredi	"Perle"	Not selected
9	Vale LP	"Stronza"	Not selected
10	Fellow	"Alieno"	Not selected
11	Omini	"Mare forza 9oi"	Not selected
12	Jacopo Sol	"Cose che non sai"	Not selected

== Competing entries ==
For the third year in a row, the Newcomers' section of the contest was merged into the traditional Big Artists section, which sees the participation of 30 artists. 27 were selected by the artistic director among established artists, both by direct invitation and from over 400 submissions received by the deadline of 27 November 2023, and were announced on 3 December 2023; the remaining three artists qualified from Sanremo Giovani on 19 December 2023 and competed with a new song. All the titles were announced on that day, with the lyrics published on 30 January 2024. By tradition, the full entries were only premiered during the festival, but a special listening session reserved for the press was held at the RAI studios on 15 January.

Artist(s)	Song	Songwriter(s)	Conductor	Rank	Awards
Alessandra Amoroso	"Fino a qui"	Alessandra Amoroso; Alessandro Merli; Fabio Clemente; Federica Abbate; Jacopo Ettorre; Pierfrancesco Pasini	Francesco Mancarella	9	—N/a
Alfa	"Vai!"	Andrea De Filippi; Ian Brendon Scott; Mark Jackson	Valeriano Chiaravalle	10	Assomusica Award for Best Live Performance by an Emerging Artist
Angelina Mango	"La noia"	Angelina Mango; Dario Faini; Francesca Calearo	Giovanni Pallotti	1	Winner of the "Big Artists" section – Golden Lion; Orchestra's "Giancarlo Bigazzi" Award for Best Composition; Press room's "Lucio Dalla" Award
Annalisa	"Sinceramente"	Annalisa Scarrone; Davide Simonetta; Paolo Antonacci; Stefano Tognini	Daniel Bestonzo	3	—N/a
BigMama	"La rabbia non ti basta"	Enrico Botta; Enrico Brun; Maria Lodovica Lazzerini; Marianna Mammone	Alberto Cipolla	22	—N/a
Bnkr44	"Governo punk"	Andrea Locci; Dario Lombardi; Duccio Caponi; Jacopo Adamo; Jacopo Ettorre; Marco Vittiglio; Pietro Serafini	Enrico Melozzi	28	—N/a
Clara	"Diamanti grezzi"	Alessandro La Cava; Clara Soccini; Francesco Catitti	Valeriano Chiaravalle	24	Nuovo IMAIE "Enzo Jannacci" Award for Best Vocal Performance
Dargen D'Amico	"Onda alta"	Alfredo Rapetti Mogol; Edwyn Roberts; Gianluigi Fazio; Jacopo D'Amico; Stefano Marletta	Enzo Campagnoli	20	—N/a
Diodato	"Ti muovi"	Antonio Diodato	Rodrigo D'Erasmo	13	—N/a
Emma	"Apnea"	Davide Petrella; Emma Marrone; Julien Boverod; Paolo Antonacci	Alberto Cipolla	14	—N/a
Fiorella Mannoia	"Mariposa"	Alfredo Rapetti Mogol; Carlo Di Francesco; Federica Abbate; Fiorella Mannoia; Mattia Cerri	Clemente Ferrari	15	Musical commission's "Sergio Bardotti" Award for Best Lyrics
Francesco Renga and Nek	"Pazzo di te"	Dario Faini; Diego Mancino; Filippo Neviani; Francesco Renga	Luca Chiaravalli	25	—N/a
Fred De Palma	"Il cielo non ci vuole"	Federico Palana; Jacopo Ettorre; Julien Boverod	Valeriano Chiaravalle	30	—N/a
Gazzelle	"Tutto qui"	Federico Nardelli; Flavio Bruno Pardini	Enrico Melozzi	11	—N/a
Geolier	"I p' me, tu p' te"	Davide Simonetta; Davide Totaro; Emanuele Palumbo; Francesco D'Alessio; Gennaro Petito; Michele Zocca; Paolo Antonacci	Francesco D'Alessio	2	—N/a
Ghali	"Casa mia"	Davide Petrella; Ghali Amdouni; Michele Zocca	Enrico Melozzi	4	—N/a
Il Tre	"Fragili"	Francesco Maria Aprili; Giorgio Di Mario; Guido Luigi Senia; Iacopo Sinigaglia; Paolo Zou	Carmelo Patti	12	—N/a
Il Volo	"Capolavoro"	Edwyn Roberts; Michael Tenisci; Stefano Marletta	Carmelo Patti	8	—N/a
Irama	"Tu no"	Emanuele Mattozzi; Filippo Maria Fanti; Francesco Monti; Giulio Nenna; Giuseppe Colonnelli	Giulio Nenna	5	—N/a
La Sad	"Autodistruttivo"	Enrico Fonte; Francesco Emanuele Clemente; Marco Paganelli; Matteo Botticini; Riccardo Zanotti	Simone Bertolotti	27	—N/a
Loredana Bertè	"Pazza"	Andrea Bonomo; Andrea Pugliese; Loredana Bertè; Luca Chiaravalli	Luca Chiaravalli	7	"Mia Martini" Critics Award
Mahmood	"Tuta gold"	Alessandro Mahmoud; Jacopo Ettorre; Francesco Catitti	Carmelo Patti	6	—N/a
Maninni	"Spettacolare"	Alessio Mininni; Giovanni Pollex; Maria Francesca Xefteris; Roberto William Guglielmi	Enrico Brun	26	"CoReCom Liguria" Award for Best Lyrics on Social Issues
Mr. Rain	"Due altalene"	Lorenzo Vizzini; Mattia Balardi	Enrico Melozzi	17	—N/a
Negramaro	"Ricominciamo tutto"	Giuliano Sangiorgi	Davide Rossi	19	Lunezia Award for Best Lyrics
Ricchi e Poveri	"Ma non tutta la vita"	Alfredo Rapetti Mogol; Edwyn Roberts; Stefano Marletta	Lucio Fabbri	21	—N/a
Rose Villain	"Click Boom!"	Andrea Ferrara; Davide Petrella; Rosa Luini	Davide Rossi	23	—N/a
Sangiovanni	"Finiscimi"	Andrea Ferrara; Fabio Campedelli; Federico Vaccari; Giovanni Pietro Damian; Pietro Miano	Davide Rossi	29	—N/a
Santi Francesi	"L'amore in bocca"	Alessandro De Santis; Antonio Filippelli; Cecilia Del Bono; Daniel Gabriel Bestonzo; Mario Lorenzo Francese	Daniel Bestonzo	18	—N/a
The Kolors	"Un ragazzo una ragazza"	Alessandro Fiordispino; Antonio Fiordispino; Davide Petrella; Francesco Catitti	Valeriano Chiaravalle	16	—N/a

== Shows ==
=== First night ===
All of the competing artists performed their songs.

First night – 6 February 2024
R/O	Artist	Song	Press jury ranking
1	Clara	"Diamanti grezzi"	19
2	Sangiovanni	"Finiscimi"	30
3	Fiorella Mannoia	"Mariposa"	6
4	La Sad	"Autodistruttivo"	28
5	Irama	"Tu no"	17
6	Ghali	"Casa mia"	9
7	Negramaro	"Ricominciamo tutto"	10
8	Annalisa	"Sinceramente"	3
9	Mahmood	"Tuta gold"	5
10	Diodato	"Ti muovi"	4
11	Loredana Bertè	"Pazza"	1
12	Geolier	"I p' me, tu p' te"	23
13	Alessandra Amoroso	"Fino a qui"	15
14	The Kolors	"Un ragazzo una ragazza"	7
15	Angelina Mango	"La noia"	2
16	Il Volo	"Capolavoro"	13
17	BigMama	"La rabbia non ti basta"	16
18	Ricchi e Poveri	"Ma non tutta la vita"	12
19	Emma	"Apnea"	8
20	Francesco Renga and Nek	"Pazzo di te"	25
21	Mr. Rain	"Due altalene"	24
22	Bnkr44	"Governo punk"	28
23	Gazzelle	"Tutto qui"	14
24	Dargen D'Amico	"Onda alta"	10
25	Rose Villain	"Click Boom!"	20
26	Santi Francesi	"L'amore in bocca"	18
27	Fred De Palma	"Il cielo non ci vuole"	27
28	Maninni	"Spettacolare"	21
29	Alfa	"Vai!"	22
30	Il Tre	"Fragili"	26

=== Second night ===
Fifteen of the competing artists performed their songs. Each of them was introduced on stage by one of the non-competing artists.

Second night – 7 February 2024
R/O	Artist	Song	Presenting artist	Night rankings			
R/O	Artist	Song	Presenting artist	Radio jury	Televote		Total ranking
R/O	Artist	Song	Presenting artist	Radio jury	%	Place	Total ranking
1	Fred De Palma	"Il cielo non ci vuole"	Ghali	15	0.5%	15	15
2	Francesco Renga and Nek	"Pazzo di te"	La Sad	14	1.4%	11	14
3	Alfa	"Vai!"	Mr. Rain	7	2.0%	10	11
4	Dargen D'Amico	"Onda alta"	Diodato	11	2.2%	9	10
5	Il Volo	"Capolavoro"	Rose Villain	13	5.0%	4	7
6	Gazzelle	"Tutto qui"	Bnkr44	12	4.2%	5	8
7	Emma	"Apnea"	Santi Francesi	4	3.4%	8	6
8	Mahmood	"Tuta gold"	Alessandra Amoroso	5	4.0%	6	5
9	BigMama	"La rabbia non ti basta"	Il Tre	9	1.1%	14	13
10	The Kolors	"Un ragazzo una ragazza"	Angelina Mango	2	1.2%	13	9
11	Geolier	"I p' me, tu p' te"	Fiorella Mannoia	8	56.5%	1	1
12	Loredana Bertè	"Pazza"	Sangiovanni	3	3.6%	7	4
13	Annalisa	"Sinceramente"	Maninni	1	5.9%	3	3
14	Irama	"Tu no"	Ricchi e Poveri	6	7.7%	2	2
15	Clara	"Diamanti grezzi"	Negramaro	10	1.3%	12	12

=== Third night ===
The remaining fifteen competing artists performed their songs. Each of them was introduced on stage by one of the non-competing artists.

Third night – 8 February 2024
R/O	Artist	Song	Presenting artist	Night rankings			
R/O	Artist	Song	Presenting artist	Radio jury	Televote		Total ranking
R/O	Artist	Song	Presenting artist	Radio jury	%	Place	Total ranking
1	Il Tre	"Fragili"	Loredana Bertè	13	12.8%	3	4
2	Maninni	"Spettacolare"	Alfa	11	1.8%	15	15
3	Bnkr44	"Governo punk"	Fred De Palma	14	3.4%	11	13
4	Santi Francesi	"L'amore in bocca"	Clara	10	2.7%	13	12
5	Mr. Rain	"Due altalene"	Il Volo	8	8.7%	5	5
6	Rose Villain	"Click Boom!"	Gazzelle	9	4.7%	9	8
7	Alessandra Amoroso	"Fino a qui"	Dargen D'Amico	6	12.6%	4	3
8	Ricchi e Poveri	"Ma non tutta la vita"	BigMama	7	2.7%	12	11
9	Angelina Mango	"La noia"	Irama	1	15.5%	1	1
10	Diodato	"Ti muovi"	The Kolors	2	5.2%	7	6
11	Ghali	"Casa mia"	Mahmood	4	13.2%	2	2
12	Negramaro	"Ricominciamo tutto"	Emma	3	3.6%	10	9
13	Fiorella Mannoia	"Mariposa"	Annalisa	5	5.0%	8	7
14	Sangiovanni	"Finiscimi"	Francesco Renga and Nek	12	2.2%	14	14
15	La Sad	"Autodistruttivo"	Geolier	15	5.6%	6	10

=== Fourth night ===
The artists each performed an Italian or international song from the past (or a medley thereof), duetting with one or more guest performers.

Fourth night – 9 February 2024
R/O	Artist	Guest artist(s)	Song	Provisional ranking	Night rankings					Updated general ranking
R/O	Artist	Guest artist(s)	Song	Provisional ranking	Radio jury	Press jury	Televote		Total ranking	Updated general ranking
R/O	Artist	Guest artist(s)	Song	Provisional ranking	Radio jury	Press jury	%	Place	Total ranking	Updated general ranking
1	Sangiovanni	Aitana	"Farfalle" / "Mariposas"	29	28	30	0.8%	19	30	30
2	Annalisa	La Rappresentante di Lista and Artemìa Choir	"Sweet Dreams (Are Made of This)"	3	2	2	5.4%	4	3	3
3	Rose Villain	Gianna Nannini	"Scandalo" / "Meravigliosa creatura" / "Sei nell'anima"	20	27	26	0.6%	25	27	23
4	Gazzelle	Fulminacci	"Notte prima degli esami"	13	19	15	2.0%	11	11	13
5	The Kolors	Umberto Tozzi	"Ti amo" / "Tu" / "Gloria"	15	7	9	1.1%	17	12	15
6	Alfa	Roberto Vecchioni	"Sogna ragazzo sogna"	21	3	4	4.7%	6	5	10
7	Bnkr44	Pino D'Angiò	"Ma quale idea"	28	24	24	0.9%	18	23	27
8	Irama	Riccardo Cocciante	"Quando finisce un amore"	5	8	10	5.0%	5	6	5
9	Fiorella Mannoia	Francesco Gabbani	"Che sia benedetta" / "Occidentali's Karma"	12	16	8	1.4%	14	13	14
10	Santi Francesi	Skin	"Hallelujah"	23	5	3	2.4%	8	8	17
11	Ricchi e Poveri	Paola & Chiara	"Sarà perché ti amo" / "Mamma Maria"	19	11	11	0.8%	20	17	20
12	Ghali	Ratchopper	"Bayna" / "Cara Italia" / "L'italiano"	4	12	7	5.6%	3	4	4
13	Clara	Ivana Spagna and Children's Choir of the Turin Royal Theatre	"Il cerchio della vita"	24	21	17	0.7%	22	22	24
14	Loredana Bertè	Venerus	"Ragazzo mio"	6	22	13	1.2%	15	18	8
15	Geolier	Guè, Luchè and Gigi D'Alessio	"Brivido" / "'O primmo ammore" / "Chiagne"	1	26	28	43.3%	1	1	1
16	Angelina Mango	Rome String Quartet	"La rondine"	2	1	1	8.4%	2	2	2
17	Alessandra Amoroso	Boomdabash	"Le radici ca tieni" orchestrated on the music of "Fallin'" / "Mambo salentino" / "Karaoke"	7	18	18	2.3%	9	10	7
18	Dargen D'Amico	BabelNova Orchestra	"Modigliani" / "Dove si balla" orchestrated on the music of "The Crisis"	18	29	25	0.4%	28	29	20
19	Mahmood	Tenores di Bitti	"Come è profondo il mare"	8	4	6	3.4%	7	7	6
20	Mr. Rain	Gemelli DiVersi and the Italian national rhythmic gymnastics team	"Mary" (Note: Included lines from "Supereroi")	17	13	20	1.4%	13	15	18
21	Negramaro	Malika Ayane	"La canzone del sole"	16	10	16	0.5%	26	21	19
22	Emma	Bresh	"Imbranato" / "Non me lo so spiegare" / "Sere nere"	10	14	22	1.1%	16	19	12
23	Il Volo	Stef Burns	"Who Wants to Live Forever"	11	9	12	1.7%	12	9	11
24	Diodato	Jack Savoretti and Filippo Timi	"Amore che vieni, amore che vai"	9	6	5	0.7%	23	14	9
25	La Sad	Donatella Rettore	"Lamette"	27	30	29	0.7%	21	28	28
26	Il Tre	Fabrizio Moro	"Pensa" / "Portami via" / "Il senso di ogni cosa"	14	25	26	2.2%	10	16	16
27	BigMama	Gaia, La Niña and Sissi	"Lady Marmalade"	22	15	14	0.6%	24	20	22
28	Maninni	Ermal Meta	"Non mi avete fatto niente"	25	20	21	0.2%	29	25	25
29	Fred De Palma	Eiffel 65	"Too Much of Heaven" / "Viaggia insieme a me" / "Blue (Da Ba Dee)"	30	23	23	0.2%	30	26	29
30	Francesco Renga and Nek	—N/a	"Meravigliosa (la Luna)" / "Angelo" / "Fatti avanti amore" / "Laura non c'è"	26	17	19	0.4%	27	24	26

=== Fifth night ===
All of the artists performed their songs one final time, with the top five moving on to the final round of voting.

Advanced to the superfinal

Final – 10 February 2024
R/O	Artist	Song	Provisional ranking	Televote		Final general ranking
R/O	Artist	Song	Provisional ranking	%	Place	Final general ranking
1	Francesco Renga and Nek	"Pazzo di te"	26	0.7%	18	25
2	BigMama	"La rabbia non ti basta"	22	0.5%	20	22
3	Gazzelle	"Tutto qui"	13	1.3%	11	11
4	Dargen D'Amico	"Onda alta"	21	0.9%	13	20
5	Il Volo	"Capolavoro"	11	2.6%	8	8
6	Loredana Bertè	"Pazza"	8	3.2%	7	7
7	Negramaro	"Ricominciamo tutto"	19	0.6%	19	19
8	Mahmood	"Tuta gold"	6	4.9%	5	6
9	Santi Francesi	"L'amore in bocca"	17	0.5%	21	18
10	Diodato	"Ti muovi"	9	0.7%	17	13
11	Fiorella Mannoia	"Mariposa"	14	0.7%	16	15
12	Alessandra Amoroso	"Fino a qui"	7	1.3%	10	9
13	Alfa	"Vai!"	10	1.1%	12	10
14	Irama	"Tu no"	5	4.6%	6	5
15	Ghali	"Casa mia"	4	5.8%	4	4
16	Annalisa	"Sinceramente"	3	6.0%	3	3
17	Angelina Mango	"La noia"	2	14.2%	2	2
18	Geolier	"I p' me, tu p' te"	1	44.8%	1	1
19	Emma	"Apnea"	12	0.8%	14	14
20	Il Tre	"Fragili"	16	1.6%	9	12
21	Ricchi e Poveri	"Ma non tutta la vita"	20	0.3%	24	21
22	The Kolors	"Un ragazzo una ragazza"	15	0.4%	22	16
23	Maninni	"Spettacolare"	25	0.1%	29	26
24	La Sad	"Autodistruttivo"	28	0.4%	23	27
25	Mr. Rain	"Due altalene"	18	0.7%	15	17
26	Fred De Palma	"Il cielo non ci vuole"	29	0.1%	30	30
27	Sangiovanni	"Finiscimi"	30	0.3%	26	29
28	Clara	"Diamanti grezzi"	24	0.3%	25	24
29	Bnkr44	"Governo punk"	27	0.2%	28	28
30	Rose Villain	"Click Boom!"	23	0.3%	27	23

Superfinal – 10 February 2024
R/O	Artist	Song	Press jury rank	Radio jury rank	Televote score	Total score	Place
1	Irama	"Tu no"	5	4	7.5%	6.9%	5
2	Ghali	"Casa mia"	3	3	8.3%	10.5%	4
3	Angelina Mango	"La noia"	1	1	16.1%	40.3%	1
4	Geolier	"I p' me, tu p' te"	4	5	60.0%	25.2%	2
5	Annalisa	"Sinceramente"	2	2	8.0%	17.1%	3

== Special guests and other acts ==
Special guests included: (Note: Attributed to multiple references:)

- first night – Federica Brignone, Lazza, Tedua, and Zlatan Ibrahimovic;
- second night – Bob Sinclar, Giovanni Allevi, John Travolta, Leo Gassmann, Orchestra Casadei with Nuova Orchestra Santa Balera, Rosa Chemical, and the cast of The Sea Beyond;
- third night – Bresh, Edoardo Leo, Eros Ramazzotti (with "Terra promessa"), Gianni Morandi, Paola & Chiara, Russell Crowe, Sabrina Ferilli, Stefano Massini with Paolo Jannacci, and the Verona Arena Foundation Choir (with "Va', pensiero");
- fourth night – Arisa (with "La notte"), Francesco Bagnaia, Gigi D'Agostino, Jalisse (with "Fiumi di parole"), Margherita Buy with Elena Sofia Ricci, and the cast of the upcoming TV series Mameli;
- fifth night – Claudio Gioè, Gigliola Cinquetti (with "Non ho l'età"), Lazza, Luca Argentero, Roberto Bolle, Tananai, and Tedua.

Following the death of Toto Cutugno on 22 August 2023, Amadeus announced his intentions to include a segment paying homage to the artist's record 15 participations in the festival. This was ultimately part of the first night of the festival.

== Broadcasts and ratings ==
=== Local broadcast ===
Rai 1 and Rai Radio 2 brought the official broadcasts of the festival in Italy, with the latter featuring a special programming throughout the festival week and live commentary of the shows by Ema Stokholma and Gino Castaldo. The five evenings were also streamed online via the broadcaster's official online platform RaiPlay.

=== International broadcast ===
Outside Italy, RAI airs the festival on its international channel Rai Italia and makes the RaiPlay broadcast available in all member countries of the European Broadcasting Union, since the festival, serving as the Italian national final for the Eurovision Song Contest, is broadcast on the Eurovision network; the live broadcast of the 2024 edition, as well as the availability of related videoclips, was expanded worldwide. In addition, the event was aired on a number of local broadcasters across different countries:

International broadcasters of the Sanremo Music Festival 2024
Country	Broadcaster(s)	Channel(s)	Show(s)	Commentator(s)	Refs
Albania	RTSH	RTSH 2	Nights 1–4	Andri Xhahu and Elona Jaçellari	
Albania	RTSH	RTSH 1	Final	Andri Xhahu and Elona Jaçellari	
Canada (Note: In addition to regular broadcasters, the recordings of the five shows are available via cable television provider Rogers Cable in Canada.)	ICI Télévision		All shows (Note: Delayed broadcast)	—N/a	
Moldova	TRM	Moldova 1	All shows	—N/a	
Montenegro	RTCG	TVCG 2	All shows	Nebojša Šofranac	
Romania	TVR	TVR 1	All shows	Bogdan Stănescu and Kyrie Mendél	
Spain	RTVE	RTVE Play	Final	Daniel Borrego Escot and Giuseppe Di Bella	
Ukraine	Suspilne	Suspilne Kultura	Final	Timur Miroshnychenko	
United Kingdom	GlitterBeam		Final	Michael Dalzell and Eugenio Ceriello	

=== Ratings ===
Live show	Timeslot (UTC+1)	Date	Start (8:40 pm – 9:20 pm)		1st time (9:20 pm – 11:30 pm)		2nd time (11:30 pm – 2:00 am)		Overall audience		Ref(s)
Live show	Timeslot (UTC+1)	Date	Viewers (millions)	Share (%)	Viewers (millions)	Share (%)	Viewers (millions)	Share (%)	Viewers (millions)	Share (%)	Ref(s)
1st	20:40	6 February 2024	12.967	51.11	15.075	64.34	6.618	66.66	10.561	65.10	
2nd	20:40	7 February 2024	11.631	47.44	13.434	57.64	6.992	65.91	10.361	60.10	
3rd	20:40	8 February 2024	11.620	47.67	13.243	58.12	6.501	64.93	10.001	60.10	
4th	20:40	9 February 2024	12.824	52.17	15.531	65.05	8.513	73.04	11.893	67.80	
5th	20:40	10 February 2024	14.615	61.19	17.281	70.77	11.781	78.68	14.301	74.10	

With an average share of 74.1% and a total of 14.301 million viewers, the 2024 final achieved the highest viewership values since 1995 and 1998, respectively.

== Incidents and controversies ==
=== False bomb alerts ===
During a gala organised by RadioMediaset at Villa Nobel on 5 February on the occasion of the opening of the festival week, the local police received an anonymous call alerting about the presence of a bomb, and the venue was evacuated. However, the authorities failed to find any signs of a bomb threat. Most of the competing artists were reportedly present at the event. The following day, a similar alert for the Teatro Ariston also proved to be unjustified and the caller was identified shortly after; he confessed to intentionally giving a false alarm in order to disrupt the competition, and was scheduled for prosecution.

=== Legal actions ===
On 7 February, RAI's CEO Roberto Sergio announced that the broadcaster would take disciplinary measures against one of its journalists following a "denigratory tweet" directed at the physical appearance of contestant BigMama.

Following John Travolta's guest appearance on 7 February, when his shoes were prominently featured in the televised images, Italian consumers association Codacons filed a complaint against RAI for aggravated fraud and covert advertising, as the actor had an advertising contract with the footwear brand he was wearing; the broadcaster opened an internal investigation. In addition to this, controversy arose surrounding Travolta's skit on that night, where he was seen performing the "Chicken Dance" next to Amadeus and Fiorello, and which was widely received as "humiliating" and "discomforting" for the actor; Travolta ultimately denied consent over the use of the related video sequence, forcing RAI to remove it as an excerpt from RaiPlay.

=== Calls for Gaza war ceasefire ===
During the festival, contestants Dargen D'Amico and Ghali made statements calling for a ceasefire in the Gaza war. With the Ghali publicly calling to "stop the genocide" after his performance in the final and D'Amico stating: “there are children under the bombs, without water and without food. Our silence is co-responsibility.” In a tweet, the Israeli ambassador to Italy, Alon Bar, accused Ghali of "exploiting the festival's stage to spread hate and provocations", adding that the musical event could have been instead an occasion to express solidarity with the victims of the Nova music festival massacre.While the statement by Ghali was viewed by some as controversial, it also received praise by the president of the Association of Palestinians in Italy, Mohammad Hannoun, during a demonstration in the artist's home city of Milan Hannoun thanked the rapper "for his clear words against extermination". The following day, live on the show Domenica in hosted by Mara Venier, Ghali responded to Bar's accusation by recalling his long personal history of speaking out on such topics, pointing out that "this thing has been going on for a while" and claiming that "terror politics" prevents people from freely calling for peace. Shortly after, Venier read out a statement by RAI's CEO Roberto Sergio with an expression of his "heartfelt and staunch" solidarity to "the people of Israel and the Jewish community".

In response, pro-Palestinian demonstrations broke out between 13 and 17 February outside RAI's production centres of Naples, where a number of protesters were injured in clashes with the police; Turin, where glass bottles, eggs and smoke bombs were thrown; and Milan; as well as outside the broadcaster's general headquarters in Rome and its regional offices in Bari, Bologna, Bolzano, Cagliari, Cosenza, Florence, Genoa, Palermo, Perugia, Pescara, Trento, Trieste and Venice. (Note: Attributed to multiple references:) Sergio was preemptively put under guard following threats.

Amadeus responded to Bar's comments by stating that "any war in the world must be stopped" and adding that the competing artists sent messages of "peace, freedom of thought, racial equality, values", in line with the "inclusive" spirit of the festival. Employees at RAI released a joint statement distancing themselves from Sergio's "use of corporate media to convey [his] personal ideas and political or human affiliations", judging his message as "one-sided" and "kneeled to Israeli diplomacy"; the statement quoted D'Amico and Ghali's original calls. Lega Nord senator Alessandro Morelli, serving as governmental undersecretary, suggested the implementation of banning orders for artists who make "political propaganda" on public television, similarly to the ones in place under Italian law for people who disrupt sporting events; following heavy criticism, including by Sanremo entrant Fiorella Mannoia, Morelli stated that his proposal was meant as a "provocation", while defending his position over the artists' use of public platforms.

== See also ==
- Italy in the Eurovision Song Contest 2024
