= La Sad =

Italian pop punk band

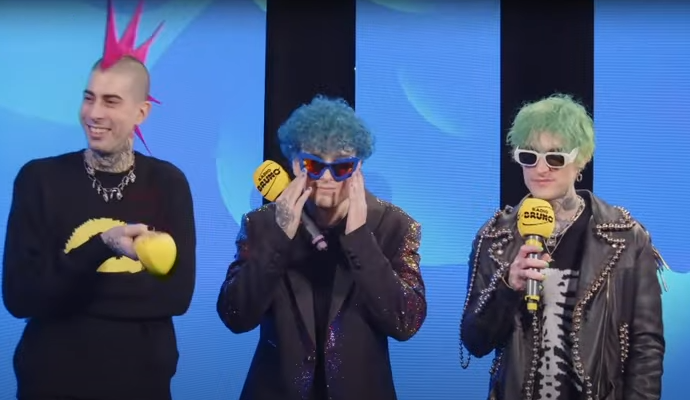
- La Sad in interviewed during the Sanremo Music Festival 2024; left to right: Fiks, Plant, Theø

Background information
- Origin: Milan, Italy
- Genres: Pop punk
- Years active: 2020–2025 (pause)
- Label: Believe
- Members: Theø; Plant; Fiks

La Sad is an Italian pop punk band formed in 2020 in Milan, consisting of Theø (Matteo Botticini), Plant (Francesco Emanuele Clemente) and Fiks (Enrico Fonte). They released their first album Sto nella Sad in January 2022.

== History ==
The band was formed when Theø (Matteo Botticini), Plant (Francesco Emanuele Clemente) and Fiks (Enrico Fonte) met in Milan. The trio came from diverse musical backgrounds, with Theø having previously been a guitarist and singer in metalcore group Upon This Dawning and trap duo Danien & Theø. Plant is a rapper and Fiks is also a singer, however from and emo-punk and techno-rave background.

They debuted in 2020 with the song "Summersad". Their first album, Sto nella Sad, was released on 14 January 2022. An extended re-issue of the album was released at the end of year, featuring new tracks, including a collaboration with VillaBanks. They collaborated with the bank Dari on the single "Wale (tanto Wale)" which was released in April 2022. In 2023, their single "Toxic" peaked at number 35 on the Italian chart and was certified gold. They released the track "Summersad 4" featuring Naska on 25 June 2023, and the single "Memoria" with bnkr44 on 1 December 2023.

The band participated in the Sanremo Music Festival 2024 with the dance-pop song "Autodistruttivo", finishing in 27th place. On the fourth night of the festival they duetted with Donatella Rettore to perform her song "Lamette". The trio ended their performance on the final night by raising their flag, which is a tricolour flag in green, pink and blue, to match the hair colours of the band. They announced that the flag represented "valori umani" (human values) and "la lotta contro ogni forma di discriminazione, violenza, odio, razzismo, abuso e sessismo" (the fight against every form of discrimination, violence, hate, racism, abuse and sexism)

After finishing their 2025 tour, they announced they would be taking a break to focus on solo projects.

Flag used by La Sad

== Band members ==
- Matteo "Theø" Botticini (born 4 October 1987 in Brescia, Lombardy) – vocals, guitars
- Francesco Emanuele "Plant" Clemente (born 3 September 1999 in Altamura, Apulia) – vocals
- Enrico "Fiks" Fonte (born 1990, from Riviera del Brenta, Veneto) – vocals

== Discography ==
=== Studio albums ===
List of studio albums, with details and chart positions
Title	Album details	Peak chart positions
Title	Album details	ITA
Sto nella Sad (re-issued as Sto nella Sad Deluxe)	Released: 14 January 2022; Label: Believe; Format: CD, digital download	30
Odio la Sad	Released: 5 April 2024; Label: Believe; Format: CD, digital download	3

=== Singles ===
List of singles, with chart positions, album name and certifications
Single	Year	Peak chart positions	Certifications	Album or EP
Single	Year	ITA	Certifications	Album or EP
"Toxic"	2023	35	FIMI: Platinum	Sto nella sad
"Summersad 4"	2023	—		Odio la sad
"Autodistruttivo"	2024	17	FIMI: Gold	Odio la sad
