= Maninni =

Italian singer-songwriter (born 1997)

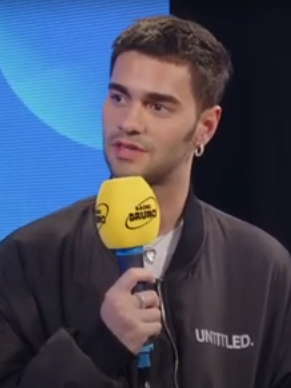
- Maninni at the Sanremo Music Festival 2024

Background information
- Born: Alessio Mininni; 19 December 1997 (age 28); Bitetto, Apulia, Italy
- Genres: Pop
- Occupations: Singer; songwriter
- Instruments: Vocals; guitar
- Years active: 2016–present
- Label: Sony Music Italy
- Website: maninni.it

Alessio Mininni (born 19 December 1997), known professionally as Maninni, is an Italian singer-songwriter.

== Early life ==
Alessio Mininni was born and raised in Bitetto, a town in the Metropolitan City of Bari. His father is a metalworker and his mother is a homemaker. He has one brother.

He fell in love with music after attending a U2 concert with his father at the age of nine, and took up guitar shortly thereafter. He graduated from the Don Lorenzo Milani liceo musicale in Acquaviva delle Fonti.

== Career ==
In 2016, Mininni competed in the 16th season of Amici di Maria De Filippi. He released two singles, "Parlami di te" and "Peggio di ieri", in 2017 and 2019, respectively.

In late 2022, Mininni took part in the Sanremo Giovani song contest with his song "Mille porte", but did not advance to the Sanremo Music Festival 2023. He competed at the Sanremo Music Festival 2024 with the song "Spettacolare".

== Discography ==
List of studio albums, with details and chart positions
| Title | Album details | Peak chart positions |
| Title | Album details | ITA |
|---|---|---|
| Spettacolare | Released: 6 February 2024; Label: Columbia; Formats: CD, digital download | 75 |

=== Singles ===
| Title | Year | Peak chart positions | Album |
| Title | Year | ITA | Album |
|---|---|---|---|
| "Parlami di te" | 2017 | — | Non-album singles |
| "Peggio di ieri" (with Marmo) | 2019 | — | Non-album singles |
| "Senza" | 2021 | — | Non-album singles |
| "Vestito rosso" | 2021 | — | Non-album singles |
| "Vaniglia" | 2021 | — | Non-album singles |
| "Bari NY" | 2021 | — | Non-album singles |
| "Irene" | 2022 | — | Non-album singles |
| "Caffè" | 2022 | — | Non-album singles |
| "Mille porte" | 2022 | — | Non-album singles |
| "Dicono" | 2023 | — | Non-album singles |
| "Graffi" | 2023 | — | Non-album singles |
| "Monolocale" | 2023 | — | Non-album singles |
| "Spettacolare" | 2024 | 33 | Non-album singles |
| "Supercalicolare" | 2024 | — | Non-album singles |
