= Ti muovi =

Single by Diodato

from the album Ho acceso un fuoco
- Released: 7 February 2024
- Length: 3:07
- Label: Carosello
- Songwriter: Diodato
- Producers: Diodato; Tommaso Colliva

Diodato singles chronology
"Ci vorrebbe un miracolo" (2023)	"Ti muovi" (2024)	"Molto amore" (2024)

Music video
- "Ti muovi" on YouTube

"Ti muovi" (transl. "You move") is a song by Italian singer-songwriter Diodato. It was released as a digital download and for streaming on 7 February 2024 by Carosello Records.

The song is Diodato's entry for the Sanremo Music Festival 2024, the 74th edition of Italy's musical festival which doubles also as a selection of the act for the Eurovision Song Contest, where it placed 13th in the grand final.

== Music video ==
A music video to accompany the release of "Ti muovi" was first released onto YouTube on 7 February 2024. The video was directed by Giorgio Testi e Filippo Ferraresi.

== Charts ==
Chart performance for "Ti muovi"
Chart (2024)	Peak position
Italy (FIMI)	20
Italy Airplay (EarOne)	26

== Certifications ==
Region	Certification	Certified units/sales
Italy (FIMI)	Gold	50,000^{‡}
^{‡} Sales+streaming figures based on certification alone.
