= Un milione di notti =

Single by Mr. Rain and Clara

from the album Pianeta di Miller
- Released: 20 October 2023
- Genre: Pop
- Length: 2:40
- Label: Warner Music Italy
- Songwriters: Mattia Balardi; Federica Abbate; Mario Apuzzo; Lorenzo Vizzini
- Producer: Mr. Rain

Mr. Rain and Clara singles chronology
"Per sempre ci sarò" (2023)	"Un milione di notti" (2023)	"Due altalene" (2024)

Clara singles chronology
"Replay" (2023)	"Un milione di notti" (2023)	"Boulevard" (2023)

Music video
- "Un milione di notti" on YouTube

"Un milione di notti" (transl. A Million Nights) is a song by Italian singer-songwriters Mr. Rain and Clara. It was released on 20 October 2023 by Warner Music Italy as the fourth single from Mr. Rain's fifth studio album, Pianeta di Miller.

== Description ==
Il brano, scritto dallo stesso Mr. Rain con Federica Abbate, Mario Apuzzo e Lorenzo Vizzini, ha segnato la prima collaborazione tra i due artisti.

== Promotion ==
The artists performed the song during the October 22, 2023 episode of the talent show Amici di Maria De Filippi.

== Music video ==
The music video, directed by Ludovico Fontanesi, was released on October 19, 2023, on the Mr. Rain's YouTube channel.

== Charts ==
Weekly chart performance for "Un milione di notti"
Chart (2023)	Peak position
Italy (FIMI)	17
Italy Airplay (EarOne)	12

== Certifications ==
Certifications for "Un milione di notti"
Region	Certification	Certified units/sales
Italy (FIMI)	Platinum	100,000^{‡}
^{‡} Sales+streaming figures based on certification alone.
