= Due altalene =

Single by Mr. Rain

from the album Pianeta di Miller
- Language: Italian
- Released: 7 February 2024
- Genre: Electropop
- Length: 3:17
- Label: Warner Music Italy
- Songwriters: Mattia Balardi; Lorenzo Vizzini
- Producer: Mr. Rain

Mr. Rain singles chronology
"Un milione di notti" (2023)	"Due altalene" (2024)	"Paura del buio" (2024)

Music video
- "Due altalene" on YouTube

"Due altalene" ("Two swings") is a 2024 song by Italian singer-songwriter Mr. Rain, released by Warner Music Italy on 7 February 2024 as the fifth single from the fifth studio album, Pianeta di Miller. It competed in the Sanremo Music Festival 2024, placing 17th.

== Description ==
The song, written by the singer-songwriter with Lorenzo Vizzini, was produced by the singer-songwriter himself and tells the story of the pain of a mother who lost her two sons, both fans of the singer-songwriter, killed by their father.

== Music video ==
A music video of "Due altalene", directed by Francesco Lorusso, was released on 6 February 2024 via Mr. Rain's YouTube channel.

== Charts ==
=== Weekly charts ===
Weekly chart performance for "Due altalene"
Chart (2024)	Peak position
Italy (FIMI)	10
Italy Airplay (EarOne)	21

=== Year-end charts ===
Year-end chart performance for "Due altalene"
Chart (2024)	Position
Italy (FIMI)	63

== Certifications ==
Certifications for "Due altalene"
Region	Certification	Certified units/sales
Italy (FIMI)	Platinum	100,000^{‡}
^{‡} Sales+streaming figures based on certification alone.
