= Onda alta =

Single by Dargen D'Amico
- Released: 7 February 2024
- Genre: Techno, Italodance
- Length: 3:34
- Label: Universal
- Songwriters: Dargen D'Amico; Edwyn Roberts; Gianluigi Fazio; Salvatore Marletta; Cheope
- Producers: Dargen D’Amico; Edwyn Roberts; Gianluigi Fazio

Dargen D'Amico singles chronology
"Pelle d'oca" (2023)	"Onda alta" (2024)	"Cinema spento" (2024)

Music video
- "Onda alta" on YouTube

"Onda alta" ('High Wave') is a 2024 song by Dargen D'Amico, from his studio album Ciao America.

The song was written by D'Amico with Edwyn Roberts, Gianluigi Fazio, Salvatore Marletta and Cheope. It was D'Amico's entry for the 74th edition of the Sanremo Music Festival, where it placed 20th.

The lyrics focus on the struggles of migrants crossing the Mediterranean, and also and also touch on sensitive themes such as social disparity, wars and toxicity of social media.

A music video in stop-motion to accompany the release of the song was directed by Stefano Bertelli.

== Track listing ==
Digital download
No.	Title	Length
1.	"Onda alta"	3:34

== Charts ==
=== Weekly charts ===
Weekly chart performance for "Onda alta"
Chart (2024)	Peak position
Italy (FIMI)	11
Italy Airplay (EarOne)	30

=== Year-end charts ===
Year-end chart performance for "Onda alta"
Chart (2022)	Position
Italy (FIMI)	58

== Certifications ==
Region	Certification	Certified units/sales
Italy (FIMI)	Platinum	100,000^{‡}
^{‡} Sales+streaming figures based on certification alone.
