= Ma non tutta la vita =

Single by Ricchi e Poveri
- Released: 7 February 2024
- Genre: Dance
- Length: 3:10
- Label: Carosello
- Songwriters: Cheope; Stefano Marletta; Edwyn Roberts
- Producers: Itaca; Edwyn Roberts

Music video
- "Ma non tutta la vita" on YouTube

"Ma non tutta la vita" (transl. "But not for a lifetime") is a song by Ricchi e Poveri. It was released as a digital download and for streaming on 7 February 2024 by Carosello Records.

The song was Ricchi e Poveri's entry for the Sanremo Music Festival 2024, the 74th edition of Italy's musical festival that doubles also as a selection of the act for the Eurovision Song Contest, where it placed 21st in the grand final.

== Music video ==
A music video to accompany the release of "Ma non tutta la vita", directed by Galattico, was first released onto YouTube on 7 February 2024.

== Charts ==
=== Weekly charts ===
Weekly chart performance for "Ma non tutta la vita"
Chart (2024)	Peak position
Italy (FIMI)	11
Italy Airplay (EarOne)	33

=== Year-end charts ===
2024 year-end chart performance for "Ma non tutta la vita"
Chart (2024)	Position
Italy (FIMI)	35

== Certifications ==
Region	Certification	Certified units/sales
Italy (FIMI)	Platinum	100,000^{‡}
^{‡} Sales+streaming figures based on certification alone.
