= Il Tre =

Italian rapper (born 1997)

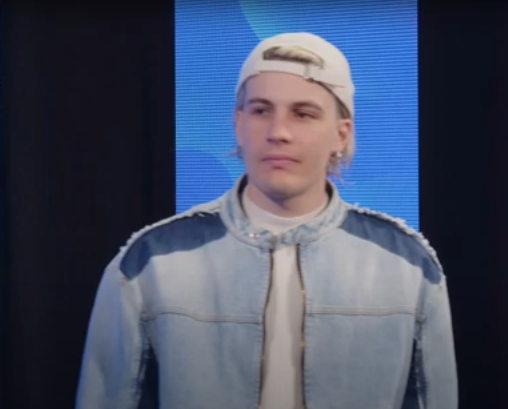
- Il Tre (2024)

Background information
- Born: Guido Luigi Senia; 3 September 1997 (age 28); Santa Maria delle Mole, Lazio, Italy
- Genres: Hip hop; pop
- Occupations: Rapper; singer; songwriter
- Years active: 2015–present
- Labels: Atlantic; Warner Music Italy

Guido Luigi Senia (born 3 September 1997), known professionally as Il Tre (Italian for 'The Three'), is an Italian rapper, singer, and songwriter. He is mostly known for his album Ali – Per chi non ha un posto in questo mondo that debuted at the top of the FIMI chart.

== Career ==
=== Early years (2015–2018) ===
His career began in the 2010s, with his first work "Cataclisma", published on YouTube in 2015, but a particular turning point turned when he reached the success of the One Shot Game contest in 2016, surpassing the competition of hundreds of other artists. In 2018 he published the mixtape "Cracovia Vol. 2" from total independent, and despite this he managed to conquer in less than a week over 50 thousand downloads and 1 million streams, also running out of physical copies.

=== Signing for Atlantic (2018–2019) ===
His first official single, "Bella Guido", was released in June of the same year and immediately went in the "Top Viral" leaderboard on Spotify. He therefore began to acquire more popularity thanks to the YouTube Real Talk format, whose video exceeded 3 million views. These results lead him to sign for Atlantic / Warner Music Italy, his new single is "L’importante" produced by Ill Bosca, from Real Talk. with Atlantic he recorded singles such as "Cracovia Pt. 3" (Gold certified), "Le vostre madri", "Fight" ft Nayt and "Te lo prometto" (Platinum certified). He also appears in the "Ricercato" album by Junior Cally in the track "Cristiano".

=== Ali (2020–2021) ===
On 19 February 2021, he released his debut studio album Ali – Per chi non ha un posto in questo mondo, anticipated by the single "Pioggia". After just 1 week by its release, the album makes its debut at the top of the ranking of the best-selling albums of the week, created by the FIMI (Italian Music Industry Federation).

=== Sanremo Music Festival (2024) ===
Il Tre competed in the Sanremo Music Festival 2024 with the song "Fragili".

== Discography ==
=== Studio albums ===
- Ali (2021) - No. 1 Italy
- Invisibili (2023) – No. 1 Italy
- Anima nera (2025) – No. 7 Italy

=== Mixtapes ===
- Cataclisma (2015)
- Cracovia (2016)
- Cracovia Vol. 2 (2018)

=== Singles ===
List of singles as lead artist, with selected chart positions, showing year released and album name
Title	Year	Peak chart positions	Certifications	Album
Title	Year	ITA	Certifications	Album
"Cracovia, Pt. 3"	2019	76	FIMI: Platinum	Ali
"Te lo prometto"	2020	13	FIMI: 2× Platinum	Ali
"Il tuo nome"	2021	38	FIMI: Gold	Ali
"Fuori è notte"	2021	69	FIMI: Gold	Ali
"Guess Who's Back"	2022	—		Non-album singles
"Boogie Woogie"	2022	—		Non-album singles
"Roma"	2023	83	FIMI: Gold	Invisibili
"Cracovia, Pt. 4"	2023	85		Invisibili
"Offline" (featuring VillaBanks)	2023	—		Non-album single
"A volte"	2023	—		Invisibili
"Fragili"	2024	15	FIMI: Platinum	Invisibili
"Camminare sulla Luna"	2024	—		Invisibili
"—" denotes a single that did not chart or was not released.
