= Capolavoro =

Single by Il Volo

from the album Ad Astra
- Released: 7 February 2024
- Genre: Pop
- Length: 3:18
- Label: Epic; Sony
- Songwriters: Edwyn Roberts; Stefano Marletta; Michael Tenisci
- Producers: Edwyn Roberts; Federico Nardelli

Il Volo singles chronology
"Màkari" (2021)	"Capolavoro" (2024)

Music video
- "Capolavoro" on YouTube

"Capolavoro" (transl. "Masterpiece") is a song by Italian ensemble Il Volo. It was released as a digital download and for streaming on 7 February 2024 by Epic Records and Sony Music.

The song was Il Volo's entry for the Sanremo Music Festival 2024, the 74th edition of Italy's musical festival that doubles also as a selection of the act for the Eurovision Song Contest, where it placed 8th in the grand final.

== Music video ==
A music video to accompany the release of "Capolavoro", directed by Leandro Manuel Emede, was first released onto YouTube on 7 February 2024.

== Charts ==
Chart performance for "Capolavoro"
Chart (2024)	Peak position
Italy (FIMI)	23
Italy Airplay (EarOne)	43

== Certifications ==
Region	Certification	Certified units/sales
Italy (FIMI)	Gold	50,000^{‡}
^{‡} Sales+streaming figures based on certification alone.
