= Madame discography =

Discography of Italian singer-songwriter and rapper Madame

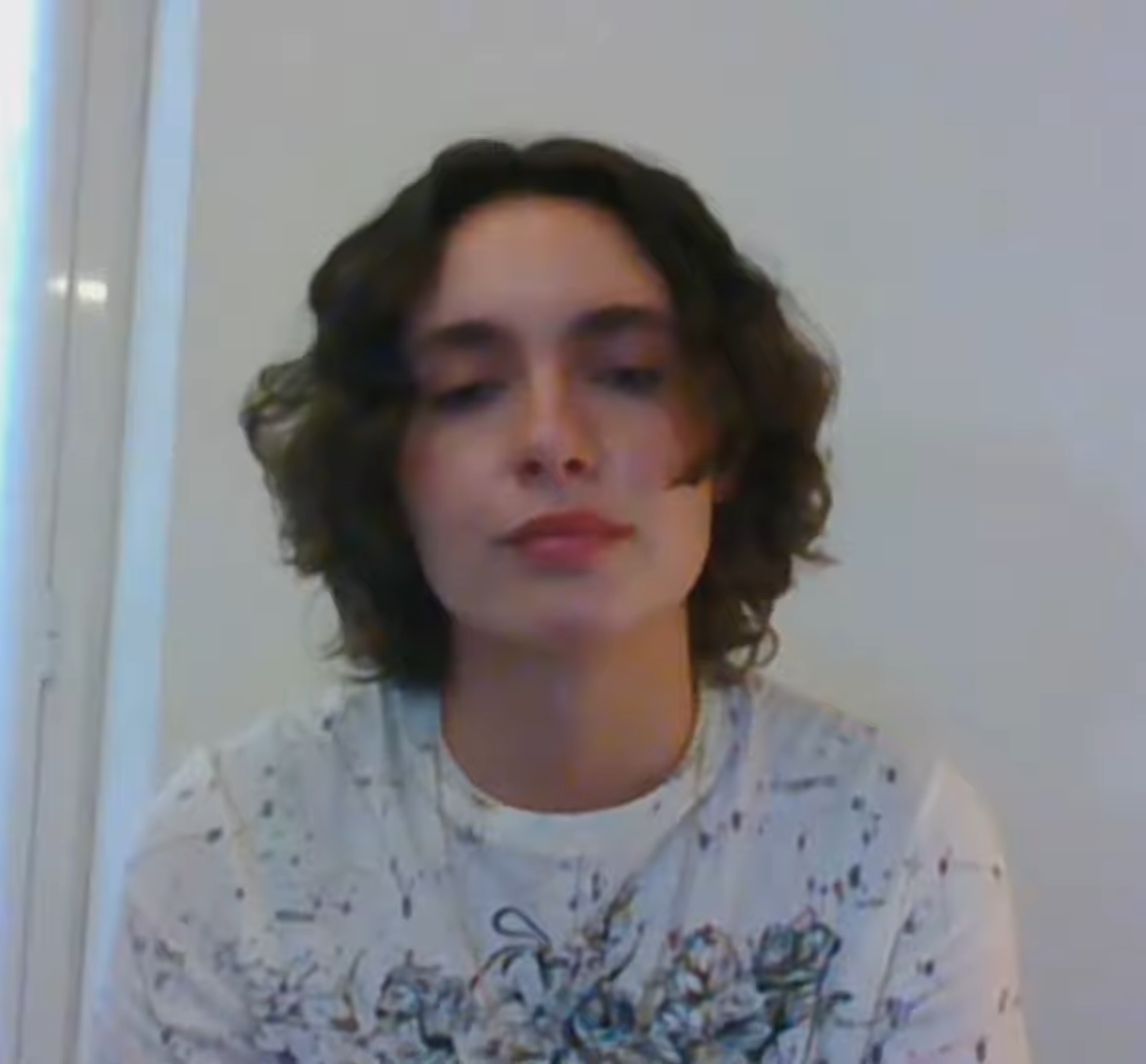
- Madame in March 2021
- Studio albums: 3
- Singles: 28

The discography of Italian singer-songwriter and rapper Madame consists of three studio albums and twenty-eight singles as primary or featured artist.

== Albums ==
=== Studio albums ===
List of studio albums, with chart positions and certifications
Title	Album details	Peak chart positions		Certifications
Title	Album details	ITA	SWI	Certifications
Madame	Released: 19 March 2021; Label: Sugar Music; Format: CD, LP, digital download, streaming	1	38	FIMI: 4× Platinum
L'amore	Released: 31 March 2023; Label: Sugar Music; Format: CD, LP, digital download, streaming	1	—	FIMI: Platinum
Disincanto	Released: 16 April 2026; Label: Sugar Music; Format: CD, LP, digital download, streaming	2	31	FIMI: Platinum

== Singles ==
=== As lead artist ===
List of singles, with chart positions, album name and certifications
Single	Year	Peak chart positions		Certifications	Album or EP
Single	Year	ITA	SWI	Certifications	Album or EP
"Anna"	2018	—	—		Non-album singles
"Sciccherie"	2018	—	—	FIMI: Platinum	Non-album singles
"17"	2019	—	—	FIMI: Gold	Non-album singles
"La promessa dell'anno"	2019	—	—		Non-album singles
"Baby"	2020	36	—	FIMI: Platinum	Madame
"Sentimi"	2020	25	—		Non-album single
"Clito"	2020	47	—		Madame
"Il mio amico" (with Fabri Fibra)	2020	11	—	FIMI: Platinum	Madame
"Voce"	2021	2	92	FIMI: 4× Platinum	Madame
"Marea"	2021	7	—	FIMI: 3× Platinum	Madame
"Tu mi hai capito" / "Tu m'as compris" (featuring Sfera Ebbasta or Hatik)	2021	2	—	FIMI: 4× Platinum	Madame
"L'eccezione"	2022	28	—	FIMI: Platinum	Bang Bang Baby
"Il bene nel male"	2023	4	28	FIMI: 3× Platinum	L'amore
"Aranciata"	2023	39	—	FIMI: Platinum	L'amore
"Ho fatto un sogno" (with Tananai and Rose Villain)	2024	17	—		Non-album single
"Disincanto"	2026	26	—		Disincanto
"OK"	2026	29	—		Disincanto
"Rosso come il fango"	2026	81	—		Disincanto
"Volevo capire" (featuring Marracash)	2026	10	—	FIMI: Gold	Disincanto
"M'ama non m'ama"	2026	44	—		Disincanto
"—" denotes an item that did not chart in that country.

=== As featured artist ===
List of singles, with chart positions, album name and certifications
Single	Year	Peak chart positions	Certifications	Album
Single	Year	ITA	Certifications	Album
"Mira" (Ensi featuring Madame)	2019	—		Clash Again
"Spaccato" (Don Joe featuring Madame and Dani Faiv)	2020	38		Non-album single
"Fck U" (Psicologi featuring Madame)	2020	89		Millennium Bug
"Defuera" (Dardust featuring Ghali, Madame and Marracash)	2020	33	FIMI: Platinum	Non-album singles
"Nuove strade" (Ernia, Rkomi, Gaia, Madame, Samurai Jay and Andry the Hitmaker)	2020	51		Non-album singles
"Euforia" (Chris Nolan featuring Tedua, Madame, Aiello and Birthh)	2020	89		Non-album singles
"La strega del frutteto" (Sick Luke featuring Chiello and Madame)	2021	18	FIMI: Gold	X2
"Perso nel buio" (Sangiovanni featuring Madame)	2021	9	FIMI: Platinum	Sangiovanni
"Mi fiderò" (Marco Mengoni featuring Madame)	2021	12	FIMI: 4× Platinum	Materia (Terra)
"Pare" (Ghali featuring Madame)	2022	29	FIMI: 2× Platinum	Sensazione ultra
"Caos" (Fabri Fibra featuring Lazza and Madame)	2022	2	FIMI: 2× Platinum	Caos
"Too Late" (Nitro featuring Madame)	2023	29	FIMI: Gold	Outsider
"Io ti conosco" (Gianmaria featuring Madame)	2023	75		Non-album single
"Amica" (Annalisa featuring Madame)	2026	24		Ma io sono fuoco: Platinum Edition
"—" denotes an item that did not chart in that country.

== Other charted songs ==
List of charted non-single appearances in studio albums, with chart positions, album name and certifications
Song	Year	Peak chart positions	Certifications	Album or EP
Song	Year	ITA	Certifications	Album or EP
"Luna" (featuring Gaia)	2021	35	FIMI: Gold	Madame
"Bugie" (featuring Rkomi and Carl Brave)	2021	15	FIMI: Platinum	Madame
"Bamboline boliviane"	2021	57		Madame
"Istinto"	2021	34		Madame
"Babaganoush" (featuring Pinguini Tattici Nucleari)	2021	21	FIMI: Gold	Madame
"Amiconi - Freestyle"	2021	54		Madame
"Dimmi ora" (featuring Guè)	2021	18		Madame
"Vergogna"	2021	66		Madame
"Mami papi"	2021	51		Madame
"Nuda"	2021	31		Madame
"Mood" (featuring VillaBanks)	2021	30		Madame
"Tutti muoiono" (featuring Blanco)	2021	28	FIMI: Gold	Madame
"Quanto forte ti pensavo"	2023	8	FIMI: Platinum	L'amore
"Come stai?"	2026	64		Disincanto
"Invidiosa"	2026	91		Disincanto
"Bestia"	2026	93		Disincanto
"Puttana svizzera" (with Nerissima Serpe, Papa V and 6occia)	2026	70		Disincanto

== Guest appearances ==
List of non-single appearances on compilation albums or other artists' albums, with chart positions, album name and certifications
Song	Year	Peak chart positions	Certifications	Album or EP
Song	Year	ITA	Certifications	Album or EP
"Farabutto" (Tredici Pietro featuring Madame)	2019	—		Assurdo
".Rosso" (The Night Skinny featuring Madame and Rkomi)	2019	26		Mattoni
"Madame – L'anima" (Marracash featuring Madame)	2019	7	FIMI: 3× Platinum	Persona
"Andromeda" (Elodie featuring Madame – Merk & Kremont X BB Team Remix)	2020	—		This Is Elodie
"Fuoriluogo" (Ernia featuring Madame)	2020	—	FIMI: Gold	Gemelli
"Weekend" (Bloody Vinyl, Slait & Young Miles featuring Lazza, Madame & Massimo Pericolo)	2020	6	FIMI: Platinum	BV3
"Alibi" (Mecna featuring Madame)	2020	76		Mentre nessuno guarda
"Non è vero niente" (Negramaro featuring Madame)	2020	74		Contatto
"Acqua" (Mace featuring Rkomi and Madame)	2021	24		Obe
"Airforce" (Massimo Pericolo featuring Madame)	2021	19	FIMI: Platinum	Solo tutto
"Poi poi poi" (Leon Faun and Duffy featuring Madame)	2021	—		C'era una volta
"Notte gialla" (Emis Killa featuring Madame)	2021	45	FIMI: Gold	Keta Music, Vol. 3
"Partire da te" (Rkomi featuring Madame)	2021	—		Taxi Driver (MTV Unplugged)
"Cicatrici" (Ariete featuring Madame)	2022	52	FIMI: Platinum	Specchio
"Mujer" (Shiva featuring Madame)	2022	46	FIMI: Gold	Dark Love
"Blessed" (Night Skinny featuring Madame, Drast, Thasup & Ariete)	2022	14	FIMI: Gold	Botox
"Come mi guardi" (Night Skinny featuring Madame, Coez and Bresh)	2022	31	FIMI: Gold	Botox
"Hattori Hanzo" (Rose Villain featuring Madame)	2024	63		Radio Sakura
"Amore cieco" (Night Skinny featuring Madame)	2024	34		Containers
"Perché" (Ernia featuring Madame)	2025	9		Per soldi e per amore
"Ioeio" (Angelina Mango featuring Madame)	2025	74		Caramé
"—" denotes an item that did not chart in that country.

== Songwriting credits ==
List of songs written or co-written by Madame for other artists
Title	Year	Artist	Album
"Scatola" (Madame, Laura Pausini, Shablo, Luca Faraone)	2022	Laura Pausini	Non-album single
"Duedinotte" (Sangiovanni, Madame, Riccardo Scirè)	2022	Sangiovanni	Cadere volare
"La noia" (Dario Faini, Angelina Mango, Madame)	2024	Angelina Mango	Poké melodrama
"Ragazzina" (BigMama, Madame, Michele Canova)	2024	BigMama	Sangue
"Kiss Me" (Lil Jolie, Madame, Bias, Narduccey)	2024	Lil Jolie	La vita non uccide
"Beatrice" (Tedua, Federica Abbate, Annalisa, Madame, DiBla, Jiz)	2024	Tedua featuring Annalisa	La Divina Commedia: Paradiso
"Dove si va" (Madame, Bias, Gianmarco Manilardi)	2024	Mimì Caruso	Non-album single
"Dimmi tu quando sei pronto per fare l'amore" (Vale LP, Madame, Mario Cianchi, Zef, Alessandro De Crescenzo, Cali Low)	2024	Vale LP and Lil Jolie	Le ragazze della valle
"Febbre" (Clara, Jacopo Ettorre, Madame, Dario Faini, Federica Abbate)	2025	Clara	Non-album single

== Music videos ==
Song	Release	Director	YouTube views	Ref.(s)
Anna	13 September 2018	Dimitri Bertetto	2,280,001	
Sciccherie	21 December 2018	Dalilù	19,270,980	
17	26 June 2019	Dalilù	11,642,580	
Baby	12 March 2020	Martina Pastori	8,174,589	
Sentimi	30 April 2020	Thaevil	4,165,655	
Voce	3 March 2021	Attilio Cusani	37,459,883	
Marea	28 June 2021	Attilio Cusani	36,227,895	
Perso nel buio	18 November 2021	Attilio Cusani	6,592,481	
Tu m'as compris	28 January 2022	Jeunes Joueurs	2,485,347	
Il bene nel male	9 February 2023	Martina Pastori	42,875,341	
Aranciata	15 June 2023	Martina Pastori	9,461,825	
