= Clara discography =

Discography of Italian singer-songwriter, actress and model Clara

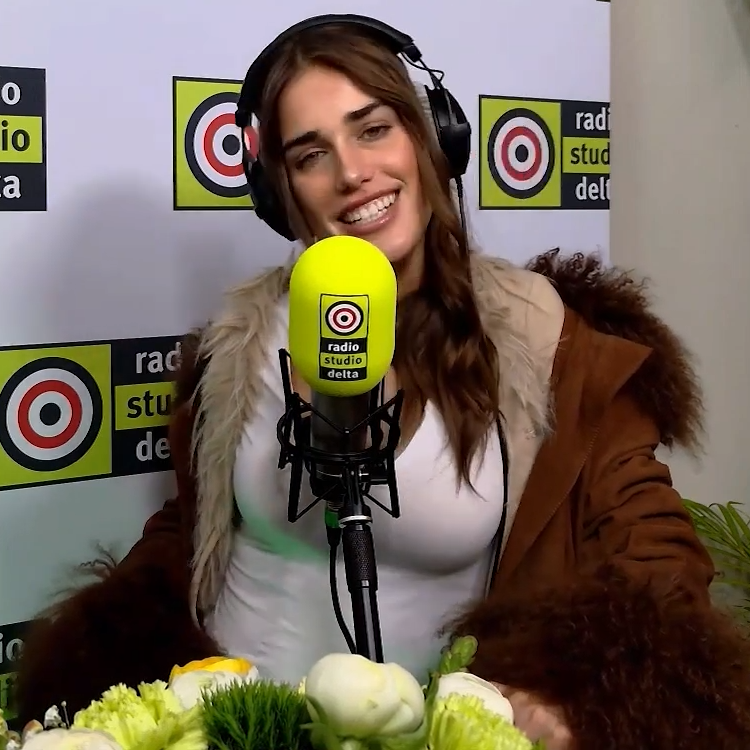
- Clara in February 2025
- Studio albums: 1
- Singles: 21
- Music videos: 17

The discography of Italian singer-songwriter, actress and model Clara consists of one studio albums, twenty-one singles and seventeen music videos.

== Studio albums ==
List of albums, with selected chart positions
Title	Album details	Peak chart positions	Certifications
Title	Album details	ITA	Certifications
Primo	Released: 16 February 2024; Label: Warner Music Italy; Format: CD, digital download, streaming	6	FIMI: Gold

== Singles ==
=== As lead artist ===
List of singles as lead artist, with selected chart positions, showing year released and album name
Title	Year	Peak chart positions	Certifications	Album
Title	Year	ITA	Certifications	Album
"Freak"	2020	—		Non-album singles
"Ammirerò" (with Kermit)	2021	—		Non-album singles
"Bilico" (featuring Seife)	2021	—		Non-album singles
"Il tempo delle mele"	2022	—		Non-album singles
"Origami all'alba" (with Matteo Paolillo and Lolloflow)	2023	4	FIMI: 4× Platinum	Primo
"Cicatrice"	2023	—		Primo
"Un milione di notti" (with Mr. Rain)	2023	17	FIMI: Platinum	Pianeta di Miller
"Boulevard"	2023	—		Primo
"Diamanti grezzi"	2024	12	FIMI: Platinum	Primo
"Ragazzi fuori"	2024	37	FIMI: Gold	Primo
"Nero gotico"	2024	83		Primo
"Golfo x despecho" (with Lérica and Abraham Mateo)	2024	—		Non-album singles
"Febbre"	2025	23		Non-album singles
"Scelte stupide" (with Fedez)	2025	13	FIMI: Gold	Non-album singles
"Uragani"	2025	67		Non-album singles
"Codice rosso" (featuring Ketama126)	2025	—		Non-album singles
"Primadonna"	2026	—		Non-album singles
"Le ragazze" (with Sangiovanni)	2026	—		Non-album singles
"—" denotes a single that did not chart or was not released.

=== As featured artist ===
List of singles as featured artist, with selected chart positions and album name
Title	Year	Peak chart positions	Certifications	Album
Title	Year	ITA	Certifications	Album
"Replay" (MV Killa featuring Clara)	2023	—		Fede
"Ghetto Love" (Icy Subzero featuring Clara)	2024	43	FIMI: Gold	Non-album singles
"Winx Club The Magic is Back" (Winx Club featuring Clara) (Note: It contains the songs Under the "Sign of Winx" and "Nel segno di Winx".)	2025	—		Non-album singles
"—" denotes a single that did not chart or was not released.

== Guest appearances ==
List of songs as featured artist, with selected chart positions and album name
Title	Year	Peak chart positions	Album
Title	Year	ITA	Album
"Io e te" (Nicola Siciliano featuring Clara)	2020	—	Napoli 51
"Al sole" (Dani Faiv featuring Clara)	2024	—	Ultimo piano B
"America" (Diss Gacha featuring Clara)	2024	—	Cultura italiana pt.2
"Lame" (Paky featuring Clara and Tedua)	2025	87	Gloria
"—" denotes a song that did not chart or was not released.

== Album and soundtrack appearances ==
=== Compilation ===
Title	Year	Album
"Diamanti grezzi"	2024	Sanremo 2024
"Febbre"	2025	Sanremo 2025
"Scelte stupide" (with Fedez)	2025	Battiti Live 2025; Radio Italia Summer Hits 2025

=== Soundtrack ===
Title	Year	Movies/Series
"Origami all'alba" (with Matteo Paolillo and Lolloflow)	2023	The Sea Beyond (Mare fuori)
"Under the Sign of Winx" (Winx Club featuring Clara; theme song)	2025	Winx Club: The Magic Is Back
"Nel segno di Winx" (Winx Club featuring Clara; theme song)	2025	Winx Club: The Magic Is Back
"Superpower" (Winx Club featuring Clara)	2025	Winx Club: The Magic Is Back

== Music videos ==
Title	Year	Director(s)
"Freak"	2020	Michele "Jamal" Manca
"Ammirerò"	2021	Michele "Jamal" Manca and John Murd
"Bilico"	2021	Simone Santus
"Origami all'alba"	2023	Laura Days
"Cicatrice"	2023	Laura Days
"Un milione di notti"	2023	Ludovico Fontanesi
"Boulevard"	2023	Federico Santaiti
"Diamanti grezzi"	2024	Attilio Cusani
"Ghetto Love"	2024	Nicolò Bassetto
"Nero gotico"	2024	Fabrizio Conte
"Febbre"	2025	Fabrizio Conte
"Scelte stupide"	2025	Byron Rosero and Fedez
"Uragani" (lyric video)	2025	Martina Amoruso
"Uragani"	2025	Gabriele Esposito
"Codice rosso"	2025	Martina Amoruso
"Primadonna"	2026	Arianna Genghini
"Le ragazze"	2026	Marco Braia

Video appearances by other artists

Title	Year	Artist(s)	Role(s)	Director(s)
"Superman"	2026	Federica Abbate	Bridesmaid (with Sarah Toscano)	Tania Caporaso
