= Giulia Stabile =

Italian dancer and television presenter (born 2002)

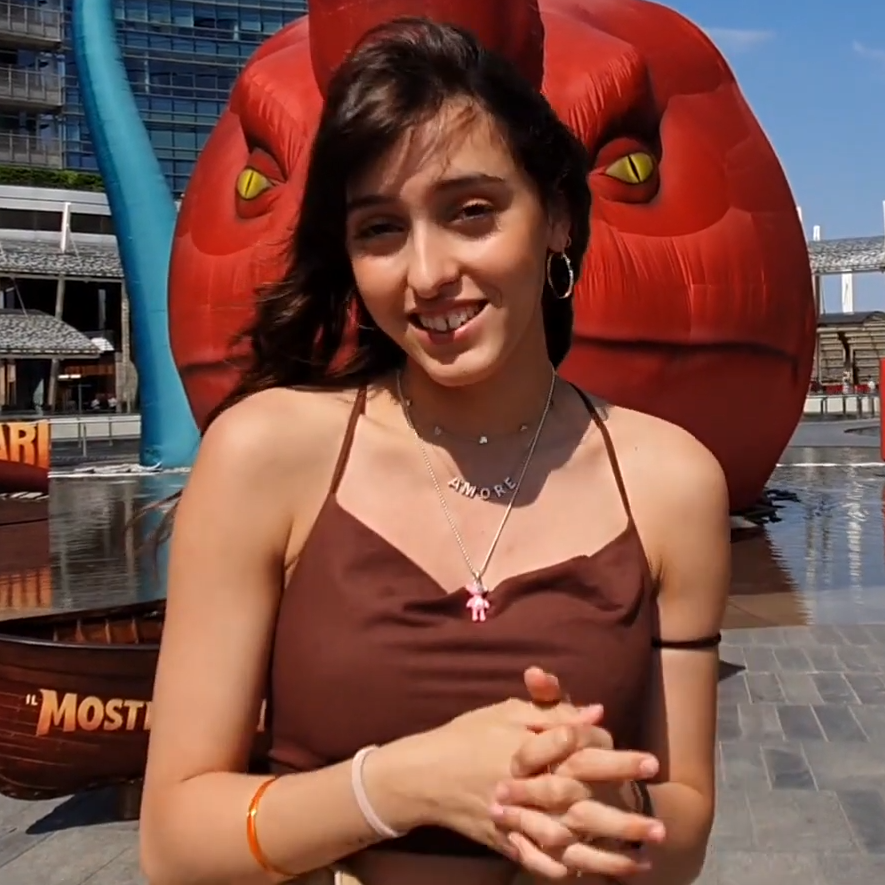
- Giulia Stabile in 2022
- Born: Giulia Lola Stabile; 20 June 2002 (age 24); Rome, Lazio, Italy
- Occupations: Dancer; television presenter
- Height: 1.67 m (5 ft 6 in)
- Partner: Sangiovanni (2020–2023)
- Parents: Carlo Stabile (father); Susi Castaner (mother)

Giulia Lola Stabile (Italian pronunciation: [ˈd͡ʒu.lja ˈlɔ.la ˈsta.bi.le]; born 20 June 2002) is a Spanish-Italian dancer and television presenter of Spanish origin on her mother's side and Italian on her father's side. In 2021, she won the twentieth edition of the talent show Amici di Maria De Filippi.

== Life and career ==
Born in 2002 in Rome, to a Spanish mother, Susi Castaner and an Italian father, Carlo Stabile. She became passionate about dance at the age of only three.

From 2006 to 2021 attended the Buccellato Rossi Academy, from which she obtained her diploma after finishing it. In 2014 he participated in the program Ti lascio una canzone, conducted by Antonella Clerici.

In November 2020 she participated in the auditions of the twentieth edition of the musical talent show Amici di Maria De Filippi, then accessing the initial phase. On 20 March 2021 she gained access to the evening phase of the program by joining the team captained by professors Anna Pettinelli and Veronica Peparini and on the following 15 May she reached the final, coming out the winner, becoming the first female dancer to achieve this result. She later returns to the program as a professional dancer.

On 20 June 2021 he participated in the Domenica in program, broadcast on Rai 1 with the conduct of Mara Venier. In the same year Carla Fracci Mon Amour participated in the event, dedicated to the great dancer after her death, and in the program Una voce per Padre Pio, conducted by Mara Venier.

Since 18 September 2021 he has been hosting the talent show broadcast on Canale 5 Tú sí que vales. In the same year he hosted the program Fai un gavettone, broadcast on the Witty TV platform. From 2022 to 2024 she has been conducting Intervista Stabile for the Witty TV web platform. From 2022 to 2023 he conducted Oreo Challenge for the Witty TV web platform and broadcast on Canale 5 at the end of the day-times of Amici di Maria De Filippi.

In 2022 she was chosen to voice in the animated film The Sea Beast (Il mostro dei mari) directed by Chris Williams and where she voiced the young Lookout of the Inevitable. The film was released on the Netflix streaming platform on 8 July 2022. In the same year she took part in the Giving Back Generation series.

On 5 September 2022 she took part dancing in the final show of Onedance, organized by Roberto Bolle. On 19 and 23 October 2022, at the Palazzo dello Sport in Rome and at the Mediolanum Forum in Assago, she performed as part of Sangiovanni's corps de ballet on his tour of the arenas, also playing the role of choreographer. In November of the same year he announced that he had choreographed Sangiovanni's "Farfalle" within the video game Just Dance 2023 Edition.

On 17 January 2023 he participated as a competitor in the Millennials team together with Paolo Ciavarro, Ema Stokholma and Pierpaolo Pretelli in the television program Boomerissima, broadcast on Rai 2 with the conduction of Alessia Marcuzzi. On 28 January of the same year she was interviewed again in the Verissimo program, broadcast on Canale 5 with Silvia Toffanin conducting.

In 2023 she co-hosted and took part in the Amici Full Out Live dance troupe, together with Nicolò De Devitiis and Isobel Fetiye Kinnear. In the same year she participated as a dancer in the events Love Mi and Carla Fracci Mon Amour and choreographed the music video for "Che t'o dico a fa'" by Angelina Mango. From the same year to 2025 she became a testimonial for the sanitary napkin brand Lines. In 2024 she became the testimonial of the new Let's Move advertising campaign of S'Agapõ jewels, a brand of the Bros Manifatture group. In May 2025, she appeared in the video clip of Michele Bravi and Mida's single" Popolare". In 2026 she officially joined the corps de ballet of Rosalía's Lux Tour.

== Personal life ==
From December 2020 to June 2023 has been sentimentally linked to the singer Sangiovanni, also a competitor of the 2020-2021 season of Amici di Maria De Filippi.

== Filmography ==
=== Films ===
Year	Title	Role(s)	Notes
2022	The Sea Beast	Lea the Lookout	Italian dub; voice role

=== Television ===
Year	Title	Role(s)	Notes
2014	Ti lascio una canzone	Contestant	Talent show (season 7)
2020–present	Amici di Maria De Filippi	Contestant	Talent show (season 20) – Winner
2020–present	Amici di Maria De Filippi	Professional dancer	Member of the dance crew and assistant choreographer (seasons 21–present)
2021	Una voce per Padre Pio	Dancer	Special
2021–present	Tú sí que vales	Co-host	Talent show (seasons 8–present)
2023	Boomerissima	Contestant	Talent show (season 1)
2023	Love Mi	Dancer	Special
2023	Amici Full Out Live	Professional dancer / co-host	Special
2026	Alessandro Borghese - Celebrity Chef	Contestant	Reality show (season 4)

=== Music videos ===
Year	Title	Artist(s)	Role(s)
2021	"Gucci Bag"	Sangiovanni	Dancer
2021	"Lady"	Sangiovanni	Dancer
2021	"Yellow"	Aka 7even	Dancer
2021	"Libertad"	Ibla	Dancer
2021	"Malibu"	Sangiovanni	Dancer / choreographer
2023	"Che t'o dico a fa'"	Angelina Mango	Choreographer
2025	"Popolare"	Michele Bravi and Mida	Dancer

=== Video games ===
Year	Title	Role(s)	Notes
2023	Just Dance 2023 Edition	Choreographer	Choreographed "Farfalle" and had her likeness portrayed by Alexandra Ponomaryova

== Web TV ==
Year	Title	Platform	Role(s)
2021	Fai un gavettone	Witty TV	Presenter
2021	Carla Fracci Mon Amour	YouTube	Guest star
2021–2023	Oreo Challenge	Witty TV	Presenter
2021–2024	Intervista Stabile	Witty TV	Presenter

== Tours ==
Year	Title	Artist(s)	Role(s)
2022	On Dance		Dancer
2022	Carla Fracci Mon Amour		Dancer
2023	Madame tour	Madame	Dancer / choreographer
2023	Sangiovanni tour	Sangiovanni	Choreographer
2026	Lux Tour	Rosalía	Dancer
2026	Brit Awards		Dancer

== Commercials ==
- Lines (2023–2025)
- Let's Move (2024)

== Awards and nominations ==
Year	Title	Nomination	Work	Result	Notes
2021	Amici di Maria De Filippi	Winner in the "Dance" Category (season 20)	Herself	Won	
2021	Amici di Maria De Filippi	TIM Award (season 20)	Herself	Won	
