= Disincanto =

Disincanto may refer to:

- Disincanto (Mango album), 2002
- Disincanto (Madame album), 2026
- Disincanto (song), a 2026 single by Madame
