= Sangiovanni (EP) =

EP by Sangiovanni
- Released: 14 May 2021
- Language: Italian
- Label: Sugar; Universal
- Producer: Zef; Dardust; Bias; Cosmophonix

Sangiovanni chronology
Sangiovanni (2021)	Cadere volare (2022)

Singles from Sangiovanni
- 1. "Guccy Bag" Released: 15 December 2020; 2. "Lady" Released: 20 January 2021; 3. "Tutta la notte" Released: 17 February 2021; 4. "Hype" Released: 28 March 2021; 5. "Malibu" Released: 17 May 2021

Singles from Sangiovanni (digital re-issue)
- 1. "Raggi gamma" Released: 24 September 2021; 2. "Perso nel buio" Released: 12 November 2021

Sangiovanni is the debut EP by Italian singer Sangiovanni. It was released on 14 May 2021 and peaked at number 1 on the Italian Albums Chart.

The EP includes the hit singles "Lady", "Tutta la notte" and "Malibu".

== Track listing ==
Sangiovanni track listing
No.	Title	Writer(s)	Producer(s)	Length
1.	"Hype"	Sangiovanni; Alessandro La Cava; Stefano Tognini	Zef	2:53
2.	"Malibu"	Dardust; La Cava	Dardust	2:46
3.	"Tutta la notte"	Dardust; Bias	Dardust; Bias	2:41
4.	"Lady"	Sangiovanni; La Cava	Zef	2:36
5.	"Guccy Bag"	Bias	Bias	3:22
6.	"Maledetta primavera" (Loretta Goggi cover)	Totò Savio; Paolo Amerigo Cassella	Cosmophonix	2:03

Sangiovanni digital re-issue track listing
No.	Title	Writer(s)	Producer(s)	Length
1.	"Perso nel buio" (featuring Madame)	Sangiovanni; Madame; Riccardo Scirè; Raige	Riccardo Scirè	2:50
2.	"Raggi gamma"	Sangiovanni; La Cava; Dario Lombardi; Jacopo Adamo	Dardust; Erin; JxN	3:15
3.	"Malibu" (featuring Trevor Daniel)	Dardust; La Cava	Dardust	2:46

== Charts ==
=== Weekly charts ===
Weekly chart performance for Sangiovanni
Chart (2021)	Peak position
Italian Albums (FIMI)	1
Swiss Albums (Schweizer Hitparade)	34

=== Year-end charts ===
2021 year-end chart performance for Sangiovanni
Chart	Position
Italian Albums (FIMI)	2

2022 year-end chart performance for Sangiovanni
Chart	Position
Italian Albums (FIMI)	44

== Certifications ==
Certifications for Sangiovanni
Region	Certification	Certified units/sales
Italy (FIMI)	4× Platinum	200,000^{‡}
^{‡} Sales+streaming figures based on certification alone.
