= Ragazzi fuori (disambiguation) =

Boys on the Outside (Italian: Ragazzi fuori, idiomatically Hustlers Outside) is a 1990 Italian drama film directed by Marco Risi.

Ragazzi fuori may also refer to:

- "Ragazzi fuori" (Clementino song), 2017
- "Ragazzi fuori" (Clara song), 2024
