= Volevo capire =

2026 song by Madame featuring Marracash

Single by Madame featuring Marracash

from the album Disincanto
- Released: 17 April 2026
- Length: 3:27
- Label: Sugar Music
- Producer: Bias

Madame singles chronology
"Rosso come il fango" (2026)	"Volevo capire" (2026)	"M'ama non m'ama" (2026)

Marracash singles chronology
"È finita la pace" (2026)	"Volevo capire" (2026)	"Qualcosa che brilla" (2026)

Music video
- "Volevo capire" on YouTube

"Volevo capire" is a song by Italian singer Madame, featuring rapper Marracash. It was released on 16 April 2026 as the third track on Madame's third studio album, Disincanto, and entered radio rotation as a single the next day.

The song explores identity, self-worth and the relationship between love, money and social status through a dialogue in which Madame poses questions and Marracash responds from his own life experience. It marks the artists' third musical collaboration, following "L'anima" (2019) and "Defuera" (2020).

"Volevo capire" peaked at number ten on the Italian singles chart and was certified gold.

== Music video ==
The music video for "Volevo capire", directed by Jacopo Farina, was released on Madame's official YouTube channel on 17 April 2026.

== Charts ==
Weekly chart performance for "Volevo capire"
Chart (2026)	Peak position
Italy (FIMI)	10
Italy Airplay (EarOne)	8

== Certifications ==
Region	Certification	Certified units/sales
Italy (FIMI)	Gold	100,000^{‡}
^{‡} Sales+streaming figures based on certification alone.
