= Ma io sono fuoco =

Studio album by Annalisa
- Released: 10 October 2025
- Recorded: 2024–2025
- Genres: Pop; synth pop; electro
- Length: 35:51
- Language: Italian
- Label: Warner Music Italy
- Producers: Davide Simonetta; Placido Salamone

Annalisa chronology
E poi siamo finiti nel vortice (2023)	Ma io sono fuoco (2025)

Singles from Ma io sono fuoco
- 1. "Maschio" Released: 8 May 2025; 2. "Piazza San Marco" Released: 5 September 2025; 3. "Esibizionista" Released: 14 November 2025; 4. "Canzone estiva" Released: 13 March 2026; 5. "Amica" Released: 18 September 2026

Ma io sono fuoco (Italian for 'But I'm fire') is the ninth studio album by Italian singer-songwriter Annalisa, released on 10 October 2025 by Warner Music Italy.

== Composition ==
The album is composed of eleven tracks written by the singer-songwriter herself in collaboration with Alessandro Raina, Davide Simonetta, Giampiero Gentile, Juli, Marco Mengoni, Paolo Antonacci and Placido Salamone. The album features electropop and synth-pop sounds. Annalisa stated that she began writing new songs during the promotional tour for her previous album, E poi siamo finiti nel vortice, focusing on the concept of time and drawing inspiration from philosopher Jorge Luis Borges' theory on time. In an interview with Rockol, Annalisa described the process of creating the project as a follow-up to the previous one:

"I started to get an idea of the whole project about a year ago, although some songs were written earlier. [...] The new album is not so much about what happens, as perhaps the previous one was, but about how one reacts to what has happened. There is a common thread. But I am fire, with the adversative, it captures the desire not to be passive, not to be dragged along, perhaps managing to turn negative things into opportunities. It should be like this for everyone, but as a woman, I won't hide the fact that I feel very strongly about this issue. As a woman, I have experienced and continue to experience situations that a man might not have to endure. The central message of the album is that everyone should live their life as they wish. Given the times, it is important to talk about it."

== Cover artwork ==
The album cover depicts the singer-songwriter reclining on a bed flanked by a flame and a tiger behind her. In an interview with Corriere della Sera, the singer-songwriter stated that she was inspired by Jorge Luis Borges' poem "Time":

"The tiger has a dual meaning. It gives shape to my thoughts that keep me awake at night. At night I am active, my ideas become clearer. And then there is a reference to Borges that brought everything full circle. Transformation is the common thread running through these texts, and Borges talks about the circular nature of time in a poem in which he says, "Time is a river carrying me along, but I am that river; it is a tiger devouring me, but I am that tiger; it is a fire consuming me, but I am that fire". This is my way of understanding life: not being passive but helping to define oneself."

== Track listing ==
Ma io sono fuoco – Standard track listing
No.	Title	Lyrics	Music	Producer(s)	Length
1.	"Dipende"	Annalisa Scarrone; Paolo Antonacci; Davide Simonetta	Scarrone; Antonacci; Simonetta; Giampiero Gentile; Placido Salamone	Davide Simonetta	3:27
2.	"Piazza San Marco" (featuring Marco Mengoni)	Scarrone; Alessandro Raina; Simonetta	Scarrone; Marco Mengoni; Raina; Simonetta	Simonetta	3:38
3.	"Delusa"	Scarrone; Antonacci; Simonetta	Scarrone; Antonacci; Simonetta	Simonetta	3:04
4.	"Esibizionista"	Scarrone; Antonacci; Simonetta	Scarrone; Antonacci; Simonetta	Simonetta	3:27
5.	"Maschio"	Scarrone; Antonacci; Simonetta	Scarrone; Antonacci; Simonetta	Simonetta	3:24
6.	"Avvelenata" (featuring Paolo Santo)	Scarrone; Antonacci; Raina; Simonetta	Scarrone; Antonacci; Raina; Simonetta; Placido Salomone	Simonetta	3:20
7.	"Emanuela"	Scarrone; Antonacci; Simonetta	Scarrone; Antonacci; Simonetta	Simonetta	3:13
8.	"Chiodi"	Scarrone; Raina; Simonetta	Scarrone; Raina; Simonetta	Simonetta	3:13
9.	"Io sono"	Scarrone; Antonacci; Raina; Simonetta	Scarrone; Antonacci; Raina; Simonetta	Simonetta; Placido Salamone	3:30
10.	"Amica"	Scarrone; Antonacci; Simonetta	Scarrone; Julien Boverod; Antonacci; Simonetta	Simonetta	3:32
11.	"Una tigre sul letto continua a parlarmi"	Scarrone; Antonacci; Simonetta	Scarrone; Antonacci; Simonetta	Simonetta	2:03
Total length:					38:46

Ma io sono fuoco: Platinum Edition – Disc 1 bonus tracks
No.	Title	Lyrics	Music	Producer(s)	Length
1.	"Amica" (featuring Madame)	Scarrone; Francesca Calearo; Antonacci; Simonetta	Scarrone; Boverod; Antonacci; Simonetta	Simonetta	3:52
7.	"Canzone estiva"	Scarrone; Antonacci; Simonetta	Scarrone; Antonacci; Simonetta	Simonetta	3:21
Total length:					43:05

Ma io sono fuoco: Platinum Edition – Disc 2
No.	Title	Length
1.	"Dipende" (live)	6:07
2.	"Piazza San Marco" (featuring Marco Mengoni; live)	3:42
3.	"Delusa" (live)	3:34
4.	"Esibizionista" (live)	3:33
5.	"Maschio" (live)	3:30
6.	"Avvelenata" (featuring Paolo Santo; live)	4:21
7.	"Canzone estiva" (live)	3:42
8.	"Emanuela" (live)	6:43
9.	"Chiodi" (live)	3:15
10.	"Io sono" (live)	5:06
11.	"Amica" (live)	3:31
12.	"Una tigre sul letto continua a parlarmi" (live)	3:46
Total length:		50:50

== Charts ==
=== Weekly charts ===
Chart performance for Ma io sono fuoco
Chart (2025)	Peak position
Italian Albums (FIMI)	1

=== Year-end charts ===
Chart (2025)	Position
Italian Albums (FIMI)	67

== Certifications ==
Certifications for "Ma io sono fuoco"
Region	Certification	Certified units/sales
Italy (FIMI)	Platinum	50,000^{‡}
^{‡} Sales+streaming figures based on certification alone.
