= Malibu (Sangiovanni song) =

2021 song by Sangiovanni

- Cover of the remix version with Trevor Daniel

Single by Sangiovanni

from the EP Sangiovanni
- Language: Italian
- Released: 17 May 2021
- Length: 2:46
- Label: Sugar; Universal
- Songwriters: Alessandro La Cava; Dardust
- Producer: Dardust

Sangiovanni singles chronology
"Hype" (2021)	"Malibu" (2021)	"Raggi gamma" (2021)

"Malibu" is a 2021 song by Italian singer Sangiovanni. It was written by Alessandro La Cava and Dardust, and released by Sugar Music and Universal on 17 May 2021 as the fifth single from his debut EP Sangiovanni.

The song was released at the end of Sangiovanni's participation at the talent show Amici di Maria De Filippi. It topped the Italian singles chart and was certified eight platinums in Italy.

A remix version of the song featuring American singer Trevor Daniel was released on 30 July 2021.

== Music video ==
A music video to accompany the release of "Malibu", directed by Late Milk, was first released onto YouTube on 23 July 2021. Giulia Stabile, winner of that edition of Amici and Sangiovanni's girlfriend at the time, also starred in the video.

== Charts ==
=== Weekly charts ===
Weekly chart performance for "Malibu"
Chart (2021)	Peak position
Italy (FIMI)	1
Switzerland (Schweizer Hitparade)	48

=== Year-end charts ===
2021 year-end chart performance for "Malibu"
Chart	Position
Italy (FIMI)	1

2022 year-end chart performance for "Malibu"
Chart	Position
Italy (FIMI)	60

== Certifications ==
Region	Certification	Certified units/sales
Italy (FIMI)	8× Platinum	800,000^{‡}
^{‡} Sales+streaming figures based on certification alone.
