= Piazza San Marco (song) =

Single by Annalisa featuring Marco Mengoni

from the album Ma io sono fuoco
- Released: 5 September 2025
- Genre: Power ballad
- Length: 3:38
- Label: Warner Music Italy
- Songwriters: Annalisa Scarrone; Marco Mengoni; Alessandro Raina; Davide Simonetta
- Producer: Davide Simonetta

Annalisa singles chronology
"Maschio" (2025)	"Piazza San Marco" (2025)	"Esibizionista" (2025)

Marco Mengoni singles chronology
"Sto bene al mare" (2025)	"Piazza San Marco" (2025)

Music video
- "Piazza San Marco" on YouTube

"Piazza San Marco" is a song co-written and recorded by Italian singer-songwriter Annalisa featuring guest vocals by Italian singer Marco Mengoni, released on 5 September 2025 as the second single from Annalisa's ninth studio album, Ma io sono fuoco.

It was written by the two artists with co-writing contribution by Alessandro Raina and Davide Simonetta, and produced by the latter.

It peaked at 10 on the Italian singles chart.

== Music video ==
A music video for "Piazza San Marco" was released on the same day via Annalisa's YouTube channel. It was directed by Nicolò Bassetto and shot in the actual Piazza San Marco in Venice.

== Charts ==
Weekly chart performance for "Piazza San Marco"
Chart (2025)	Peak position
Italy (FIMI)	10
Italy Airplay (EarOne)	1

== Certifications ==
Certifications for "Piazza San Marco"
Region	Certification	Certified units/sales
Italy (FIMI)	Gold	100,000^{‡}
^{‡} Sales+streaming figures based on certification alone.
