= OK (Madame song) =

2026 song by Madame

Single by Madame

from the album Disincanto
- Released: 27 March 2026
- Length: 2:47
- Label: Sugar
- Songwriters: Madame; Bias
- Producer: Bias

Madame singles chronology
"Disincanto" (2026)	"OK" (2026)	"Rosso come il fango" (2026)

Music video
- "OK" on YouTube

"OK" is a song by Italian singer and rapper Madame, released on 27 March 2026 through Sugar Music as the second single from her third studio album, Disincanto. Produced by Bias, the song explores people pleasing and the difficulty of saying no.

== Music video ==
The music video for "OK" was directed by Jacopo Farina, and released on Madame's official YouTube channel alongside the single on 27 March 2026.

== Reception ==
Silvia Danielli of Billboard praised Madame's versatility, writing that she is "one of the few artists who can handle trap music convincingly". Danielli also highlighted the song's claustrophobic atmosphere and its portrayal of the emotional strain of feeling trapped in situations that do not reflect one's identity.

== Charts ==
Weekly chart performance for "OK"
Chart (2026)	Peak position
Italy (FIMI)	29
