= Perso nel buio =

Single by Sangiovanni and Madame

from the EP Sangiovanni
- Released: 12 November 2021
- Recorded: 2021
- Genre: Trap-pop
- Length: 2:50
- Label: Sugar Music; Universal
- Composer(s): Riccardo Scirè
- Lyricist(s): Giovanni Pietro Damian; Francesca Calearo; Alex Andrea Vella
- Producer(s): Riccardo Scirè

Sangiovanni singles chronology
"Raggi gamma" (2021)	"Perso nel buio" (2021)	"Farfalle" (2022)

Madame singles chronology
"La strega del frutteto" (2021)	"Perso nel buio" (2021)	"Mi fiderò" (2021)

"Perso nel buio" (lit. 'Lost in the Dark') is a song by Italian singers Sangiovanni and Madame. It was released on 12 November 2021 by Sugar Music and included in the re-release of Sangiovanni's debut EP Sangiovanni.

== Music video ==
The music video for "Perso nel buio", directed by Attilio Cusani, was released on 18 November 2021 via Sangiovanni's YouTube channel.

== Charts ==
Chart (2022)	Peak position
Italy (FIMI)	9

== Certifications ==
Region	Certification	Certified units/sales
Italy (FIMI)	Platinum	100,000^{‡}
^{‡} Sales+streaming figures based on certification alone.
