= Esibizionista =

Single by Annalisa

from the album Ma io sono fuoco
- Released: 7 November 2025
- Genre: Dance-pop; electropop
- Length: 3:27
- Label: Warner Music Italy
- Songwriters: Annalisa Scarrone; Davide Simonetta; Paolo Antonacci
- Producer: Davide Simonetta

Annalisa singles chronology
"Piazza San Marco" (2025)	"Esibizionista" (2025)	"Canzone estiva" (2026)

Music video
- "Esibizionista" on YouTube

"Esibizionista" (Italian: [ezibittsjoˈnista]; transl. "Braggart" or "Exhibitionist") is a song co-written and recorded by Italian singer-songwriter Annalisa. It was released on 14 November 2025 by Warner Music Italy as the third single from her ninth studio album, Ma io sono fuoco.

== Description ==
The song, written by the singer-songwriter herself with Davide Simonetta, aka "d.whale", who also handled the production, and Paolo Antonacci, features dance-pop and electropop sounds. The fourth track from the album Ma io sono fuoco, the song was made available for radio rotation on 14 November 2025.

== Promotion ==
The song was performed live by the singer-songwriter herself on 9 November 2025, during the seventh afternoon episode of the twenty-fifth edition of the talent show Amici di Maria De Filippi.

== Music video ==
A music video for "Esibizionista", directed by Byron Rosero, was released on 18 November 2025 via Annalisa's YouTube channel.

== Track listing ==
Streaming bundle
No.	Title	Length
1.	"Esibizionista"	3:27
2.	"Esibizionista" (Deborah De Luca Remix)	3:14
3.	"Esibizionista" (Upside Down Version)	3:29
Total length:		10:10

== Charts ==
Weekly chart performance for "Esibizionista"
Chart (2025–2026)	Peak position
Italy (FIMI)	3
Italy Airplay (EarOne)	1
San Marino (SMRRTV Top 50)	1

== Certifications ==
Certifications for "Esibizionista"
Region	Certification	Certified units/sales
Italy (FIMI)	Platinum	200,000^{‡}
^{‡} Sales+streaming figures based on certification alone.
