= Uragani =

Single by Clara
- Released: 5 September 2025
- Genre: Pop; dance
- Length: 2:49
- Label: Warner Music Italy
- Songwriters: Clara Soccini; Alessandro La Cava; Federica Abbate; Eugenio Maimone; Federico Mercuri; Giordano Cremona
- Producer: ITACA

Clara singles chronology
"Scelte stupide" (2025)	"Uragani" (2025)	"Codice rosso" (2025)

Music video
- "Uragani" on YouTube

"Uragani" (transl. Hurricanes) is a song co-written and recorded by Italian singer-songwriter Clara. It was released as a single on 5 September 2025 by Warner Music Italy and already distributed since 15 August for radio airplay only.

== Description ==
The song, written by the singer-songwriter herself with Alessandro La Cava and Federica Abbate, was produced by ITACA, a team founded by the musical duo Merk & Kremont, and tells the story of liberation from a stormy relationship after experiencing a tormented love.

== Promotion ==
On August 10, 2025, the song was previewed on a TG1 report. From August 15, the song was made available exclusively for radio rotation. From September 5, the song was made available on digital platforms, having been revealed by the artist herself on September 1 through her social media profiles. On September 2, she performed it live for the first time during the Future Hits Live musical event at the Verona Arena.

== Music video ==
The lyric video, directed by Martina Amoruso and released for radio airplay only starting August 15, 2025, was officially released on September 5th via the Clara's YouTube channel. The official music video, directed and choreographed by Gabriele Esposito, was released on September 12th on the same YouTube channel.

== Charts ==
Weekly chart performance for "Uragani"
Chart (2025)	Peak position
Italy (FIMI)	67
Italy Airplay (EarOne)	20
