= Tutta la notte =

2021 song by Sangiovanni

- Official cover

Single by Sangiovanni

from the EP Sangiovanni
- Language: Italian
- Released: 17 February 2021
- Length: 2:41
- Label: Sugar; Universal
- Songwriters: Dardust; Bias
- Producers: Dardust; Bias

Sangiovanni singles chronology
"Lady" (2021)	"Tutta la notte" (2021)	"Hype" (2021)

"Tutta la notte" (transl. "All night long") is a 2021 song by Italian singer Sangiovanni. It was written and produces by Dardust and Bias, and released by Sugar Music and Universal on 17 February 2021 as the third single from his debut EP Sangiovanni.

The song was released during Sangiovanni's participation at the talent show Amici di Maria De Filippi. It peaked at number 3 on the Italian singles chart and was certified double platinum in Italy.

== Charts ==
=== Weekly charts ===
Weekly chart performance for "Tutta la notte"
Chart (2021)	Peak position
Italy (FIMI)	3

=== Year-end charts ===
Year-end chart performance for "Tutta la notte"
Chart (2021)	Position
Italy (FIMI)	38

== Certifications ==
Region	Certification	Certified units/sales
Italy (FIMI)	2× Platinum	140,000^{‡}
^{‡} Sales+streaming figures based on certification alone.
