= Amica (song) =

2025 song by Annalisa, re-recorded with Madame in 2026

Single by Annalisa featuring Madame

from the album Ma io sono fuoco
- Released: 18 September 2026
- Label: Warner
- Songwriters: Annalisa, Davide Simonetta, Paolo Antonacci, Julien Boverod
- Producer: D.whale

Annalisa singles chronology
"Canzone estiva" (2026)	"Amica" (2026)

Madame singles chronology
"M'ama non m'ama" (2026)	"Amica" (2026)

Music video
- "Amica" on YouTube

"Amica" is a song by Italian singer Annalisa, originally released on 10 October 2025 as the tenth track on her ninth studio album, Ma io sono fuoco. The song enacts an imaginary conversation with a close female friend sought for comfort after the end of a romantic relationship.

A new version featuring Madame was released as a single on 18 September 2026, and was included on the Platinum Edition of the album. The collaboration was their first musical release together.

== Composition ==
"Amica" was written by Annalisa together with Paolo Antonacci, Julien Boverod, and Davide Simonetta, the latter also producer under his name D.whale. Its lyrics portray the need for emotional support following a difficult romantic breakup, where the "friend" of the title serves as a confidant with whom the singer can express feelings and contradictions.

The duet version was released in September 2026, nearly a year after the original track. Madame contributed additional lyrics, turning the imagined conversation into a dialogue between the two artists.

== Music video ==
The music video for the version featuring Madame, directed by Martina Pastori, was released on 22 September 2026 on Annalisa's official YouTube channel.

== Charts ==
Weekly chart performance for "Amica" (album version)
Chart (2025)	Peak position
Italy (FIMI)	93

Weekly chart performance for "Amica" (duet version)
Chart (2026)	Peak position
Italy (FIMI)	24
Italy Airplay (EarOne)	1
