= Aranciata (song) =

Single by Madame

from the album L'amore
- Released: 9 June 2023
- Genre: Synth-pop
- Length: 3:14
- Label: Sugar Music
- Composer: Michele Zocca
- Lyricists: Francesca Calearo; Michele Zocca
- Producer: Michelangelo

Madame singles chronology
"Il bene nel male" (2023)	"Aranciata" (2023)	"Too Late" (2023)

Music video
- "Aranciata" on YouTube

"Aranciata" (lit. 'Orange juice') is a song by Italian rapper and singer Madame. It was produced by Michelangelo, and released on 9 June 2023 by Sugar Music. The song was included in the digital re-issue of her second studio album L'amore.

== Music video ==
The music video for the song, directed by Martina Pastori, was released via Madame's YouTube channel on 15 June 2023.

== Personnel ==
Credits adapted from Tidal.

- Michelangelo – producer, composer, lyricist
- Madame – associated performer, author, vocals

== Charts ==
Chart performance for "Aranciata"
Chart (2023)	Peak position
Italy (FIMI)	39

== Certifications ==
Region	Certification	Certified units/sales
Italy (FIMI)	Platinum	100,000^{‡}
^{‡} Sales+streaming figures based on certification alone.
