= Alessandro La Cava =

Italian lyricist, composer and record producer (born 2000)

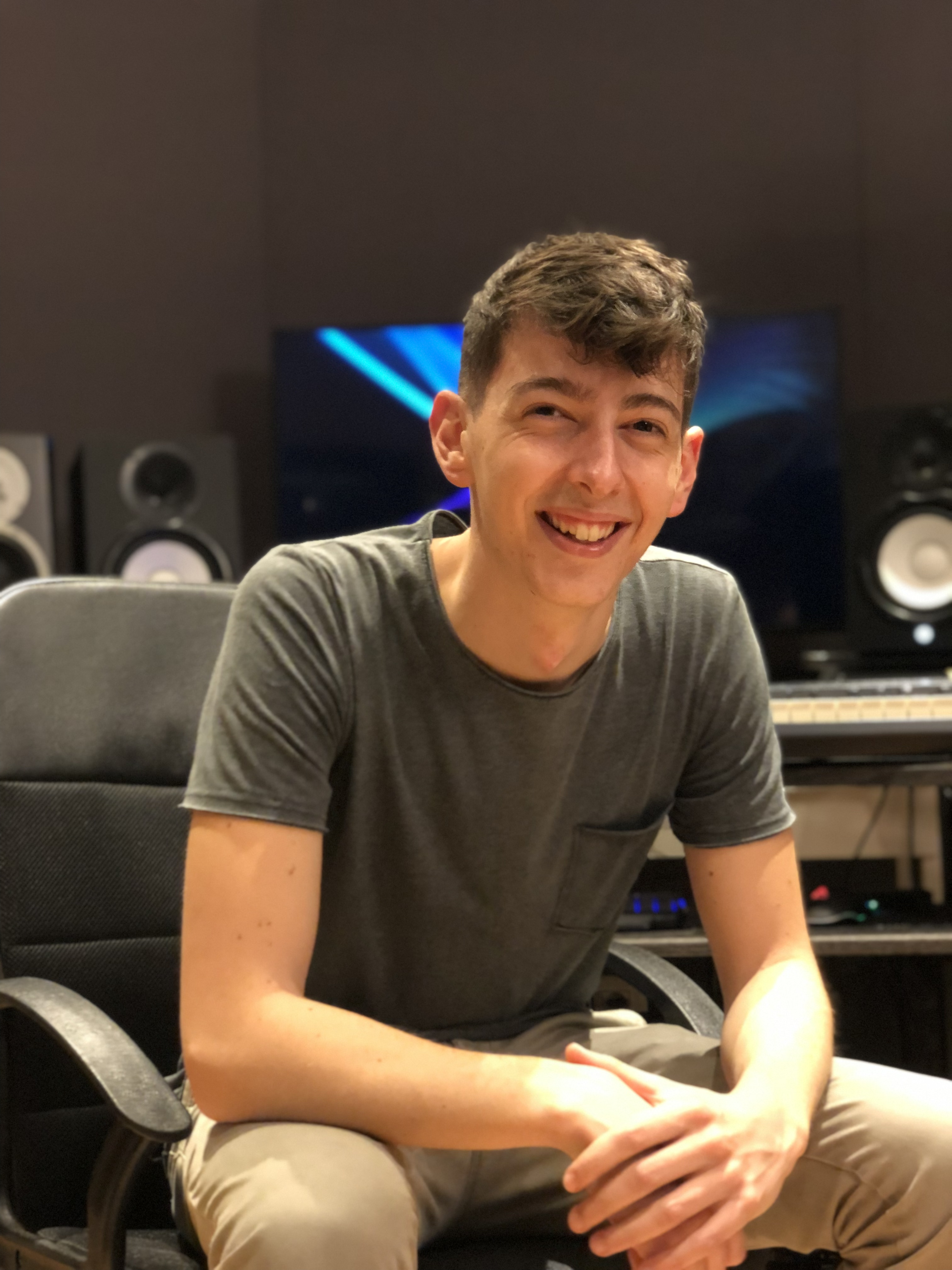
- Alessandro La Cava in the recording studio in 2021

Background information
- Born: 21 February 2000 (age 26); Rome, Lazio, Italy
- Genres: Pop; R&B
- Occupations: Songwriter; record producer
- Years active: 2011–present
- Label: Universal Music Italia

Alessandro La Cava (born 21 February 2000) is an Italian songwriter and record producer.

== Biography ==
He made his debut as a contestant on the third edition of the talent show Io canto hosted by Gerry Scotti in 2011. Passionate about music from a young age, in 2018 he won the second edition of the Tour Music Fest in the "Junior Singer" category. He began writing his first songs at the age of twelve and began studying piano at Mogol's CET, graduating as a lyricist in 2016 and as a pop music composer in 2019.

In 2018, he decided to enter the seventh edition of the "Genova per voi" competition for authors and composers, reaching the finals. In 2019, he participated again in the Tour Music Fest in the "Songwriters" category, reaching the national finals.

In 2020 he signed a contract with Universal Music Group and began working professionally as a songwriter for third parties.

Ha scritto o collaborato a vari brani per artisti e artiste quali Sangiovanni, Noemi, Rocco Hunt, Gaia, Alfa, Annalisa, Francesca Michielin, Margherita Vicario, Aka 7even, Emma Marrone, Marco Mengoni.

In 2021, he co-wrote the song "Malibu" with Sangiovanni and Dardust, which went seven times platinum in eight months, becoming the best-selling song of 2021 and the most streamed song of the year across all streaming platforms. Also in 2021, he wrote the single "Guardare giù" as sole songwriter for Noemi, also collaborating on the song's production with Francesco "Katoo" Catitti.

In 2022, he competed as a songwriter at the 72nd Sanremo Music Festival with the songs "Farfalle" by Sangiovanni, "Insuperabile" by Rkomi, "Ti amo non lo so dire" by Noemi, and "Virale" by Matteo Romano. In 2025, he wrote the song "Battito" by Fedez, which competed at the 75th Sanremo Music Festival.

== Songwriting credits ==
List of selected songs co-written by Alessandro La Cava
Title	Year	Artist(s)	Album or EP
"Testa tra le nuvole, Pt. 1"	2019	Alfa	Before Wanderlust
"San Lorenzo"	2020	Alfa feat. Annalisa	Nord
"Lady"	2021	Sangiovanni	Sangiovanni
"Finché le stelle non brillano"	2021	B3N	California
"Ancora in due"	2021	Deddy	Il cielo contromano
"Con(torta)"	2021	Enula	Con(torta)
"Hype"	2021	Sangiovanni	Sangiovanni
"Malibu"	2021	Sangiovanni	Sangiovanni
"Down"	2021	Leo Gassmann	Non-album single
"Luna"	2021	Baby K	Donna sulla Luna
"Metà mondo"	2021	Gio Evan	Non-album single
"Giove"	2021	Deddy	Il cielo contromano su Giove
"Raggi gamma"	2021	Sangiovanni	Sangiovanni
"Nuvole di zanzare"	2021	Gaia	Alma
"Occhi verdi"	2021	Deddy	Il cielo contromano su Giove
"Fili del tram"	2021	Beba	Crisalide
"6 PM"	2021	Aka 7even	Non-album singles
"Guardare giù"	2021	Noemi	Non-album singles
"La meglio gioventù"	2021	Margherita Vicario	Non-album singles
"Prima di te"	2021	Albe	Albe
"Stupidi lovers"	2021	Sissi	Leggera
"Insuperabile"	2022	Rkomi	Taxi Driver +
"Virale"	2022	Matteo Romano	Finta nostalgia
"Farfalle"	2022	Sangiovanni	Cadere volare
"Ti amo non lo so dire"	2022	Noemi	Non-album single
"Corallo"	2022	Lortex feat. Chiamamifaro	Chiamo
"Parolacce"	2022	Sangiovanni	Cadere volare
"Cadere volare"	2022	Sangiovanni	Cadere volare
"Scossa"	2022	Sangiovanni	Cadere volare
"Mariposas"	2022	Sangiovanni and Aitana	Cadere volare
"La storia più bella di sempre"	2022	Will	Manchester
"Tramontana"	2022	Matteo Romano	Non-album single
"Tutti i miei ricordi"	2022	Marco Mengoni	Materia (Pelle)
"Linea della vita"	2022	Alex Wyse	Ciò che abbiamo dentro
"Sbagliata ascendente leone"	2022	Emma	Sbagliata ascendente leone (Official Soundtrack)
"Furore"	2023	Paola & Chiara	Per sempre
"Come Marilyn"	2023	Federica Carta	Non-album singles
"Tasche"	2023	Mara Sattei	Non-album singles
"Fulmini addosso"	2023	Francesca Michielin	Cani sciolti
"Ci pensiamo domani"	2023	Angelina Mango	Voglia di vivere
"Bellu guaglione"	2023	Rosa Chemical	Non-album singles
"Acquamarina"	2023	Ana Mena and Guè	Non-album singles
"Graffiti"	2023	Boomdabash feat. Emma	Venduti
"Part of Me"	2023	Cian Ducrot and Matteo Romano	Victory (With Choir and Strings)
"Che t'o dico a fa'"	2023	Angelina Mango	Poké melodrama
"Zero"	2023	Laura Pausini	Anime Parallele
"Cos'è"	2023	Laura Pausini	Anime Parallele
"Guaglio"	2023	Petit	Petit
"Diamanti grezzi"	2024	Clara	Primo
"Soldi, amore"	2024	Clara	Primo
"Storie di rose appassite"	2024	Clara	Primo
"Musica italiana"	2024	Rocco Hunt	Non-album single
"Randagi"	2024	Holden	Joseph
"Maranza"	2024	Il Pagante and Fabio Rovazzi	FOMO
"Aria	2024	Ricchi e Poveri	Non-album singles
"Sexy shop"	2024	Fedez and Emis Killa	Non-album singles
"Melodrama"	2024	Angelina Mango	Poké melodrama
"Di Caprio"	2024	Fedez	Non-album single
"Nero gotico"	2024	Clara	Primo
"Il linguaggio del corpo"	2024	Paola & Chiara feat. BigMama	Non-album single
"Vita lenta"	2024	Emma	Souvenir
"Centomila"	2024	Emma	Souvenir
"Standard"	2024	Vybes	Non-album single
"Niente di male"	2024	Giorgia	G
"Rewind"	2024	Benji & Fede	Rewind
"Battito"	2025	Fedez	Non-album single
"Vento"	2025	Gaia	Rosa dei venti
"Di tutti"	2025	Jacopo Sol	Dove finiscono i sogni?
"Luci allo xeno"	2025	Sangiovanni	Non-album single
"Odio amore chimico"	2025	Elodie	Mi ami mi odi
"Cuore nero"	2025	Elodie	Mi ami mi odi
"Scelte stupide"	2025	Fedez and Clara	Non-album singles
"Non sono io"	2025	Noemi	Non-album singles
"Estremo"	2025	Jacopo Sol	Dove finiscono i sogni?
"Taki"	2025	Sarah Toscano	Met Gala
"Serenata"	2025	Serena Brancale and Alessandra Amoroso	Io non sarei
"Avion"	2025	Rhove	Non-album single
"Io non sarei"	2025	Alessandra Amoroso	Io non sarei
"Veramente"	2025	Sangiovanni	Non-album single
"L'unica"	2025	Giorgia	G
"Yakuza"	2025	Elodie and Sfera Ebbasta	Mi ami mi odi
"Scuse"	2025	Carla Hero	Non-album singles
"Uragani"	2025	Clara	Non-album singles
"Nuda"	2025	Gaia	Rosa dei venti
"Sogni sporchi"	2025	Emis Killa	Musica triste
"Mariposas"	2025	Cristina Lora e Guille Toledana	OT Gala 12 (Operación Triunfo 2025)
"Se finisse l'amore"	2025	Mecna	Discordia, armonia e altri stati d'animo
