= M'ama non m'ama =

2026 song by Madame

Single by Madame

from the album Disincanto
- Released: 19 June 2026
- Length: 2:32
- Label: Sugar
- Songwriters: Madame; Luca Narducci; Bias; Mr. Monkey
- Producers: Bias; Mr. Monkey

Madame singles chronology
"Volevo capire" (2026)	"M'ama non m'ama" (2026)	"Amica" (2026)

Music video
- "M'ama non m'ama" on YouTube

"M'ama non m'ama" (Italian for "loves me, loves me not") is a song by Italian singer and rapper Madame, released on 19 June 2026 through Sugar Music. It was included in the digital reissue of her third studio album, Disincanto. The song was written by Madame and Luca Narducci and produced by Mr. Monkey and Bias.

== Music video ==
The music video for "M'ama non m'ama" was written, directed and edited by Madame and Alberto Lonardi and released on the same day of the single.

== Reception ==
Gabriele Fazio of Open described the song as a "good exercise in style" that added little to Disincanto, but nevertheless found it "fresh and enjoyable". He characterized the song as a lighter departure from Madame's more introspective and poetic work, comparing it to a small indulgence amid the summer's musical releases.

In a review for Fanpage.it, Federico Pucci highlighted the contrast between introspective themes and the track's Latin trap beat, interpreting the closing line, "It's just a game", as a reflection of the emotional uncertainty explored throughout the track.

== Charts ==
Weekly chart performance for "M'ama non m'ama"
Chart (2026)	Peak position
Italy (FIMI)	44
