= Scelte stupide =

Single by Fedez and Clara
- Released: 2 May 2025
- Genre: Hyperpop
- Length: 2:59
- Label: Warner Music Italy
- Songwriters: Federico Lucia; Clara Soccini; Federica Abbate; Alessandro La Cava; Nicola "Cripo" Lazzarin
- Producer: Cripo

Fedez singles chronology
"Bella stronza" (2025)	"Scelte stupide" (2025)	"Temet nosce" (2025)

Clara singles chronology
"Febbre" (2025)	"Scelte stupide" (2025)	"Uragani" (2025)

Music video
- "Scelte stupide" on YouTube

"Scelte stupide" (transl. Stupid choices) is a song by Italian rapper Fedez and Italian singer-songwriter Clara. It was released by Warner Music Italy on 2 May 2025.

The song was written by the two artists with co-writing contribution by Federica Abbate, Alessandro La Cava and Nicola Lazzarin, and produced by the latter.

== Music video ==
A music video to accompany the release of "Scelte stupide", directed by Fedez himself with Byron Rosero, was released on YouTube on the same day.

== Live performances ==
On 3 May 2025, the song was performed for the first time during the seventh live show of the 24th edition of Amici di Maria De Filippi.

== Charts ==
=== Weekly charts ===
Weekly chart performance for "Scelte stupide"
Chart (2025)	Peak position
Italy (FIMI)	13
Italy Airplay (EarOne)	5

=== Year-end charts ===
Year-end chart performance for "Scelte stupide"
Chart (2025)	Position
Italy (FIMI)	70

== Certifications ==
Region	Certification	Certified units/sales
Italy (FIMI)	Gold	100,000^{‡}
^{‡} Sales+streaming figures based on certification alone.
