= Canzone estiva =

Single by Annalisa

from the album Ma io sono fuoco
- Language: Italian
- Released: 13 March 2026
- Genre: Synth pop; dance pop
- Length: 3:22
- Label: Warner Music Italy
- Songwriters: Annalisa Scarrone; Davide Simonetta; Paolo Antonacci
- Producer: Davide Simonetta

Annalisa singles chronology
"Esibizionista" (2025)	"Canzone estiva" (2026)	"Amica" (2026)

"Canzone estiva" (Italian pronunciation: [kanˈtsoːne esˈtiːva]; "Summer Song") is a song co-written and recorded by Italian singer Annalisa, released on 13 March 2026 through Warner Music Italy as the fourth single from her ninth studio album Ma io sono fuoco, and the lead single from its digital reissue.

== Charts ==
Chart performance for "Canzone estiva"
Chart (2026)	Peak position
Italy (FIMI)	34
Italy Airplay (EarOne)	1

== Certifications ==
Certifications for "Canzone estiva"
Region	Certification	Certified units/sales
Italy (FIMI)	Gold	100,000^{‡}
^{‡} Sales+streaming figures based on certification alone.
