= Rosso come il fango =

2026 song by Madame

Single by Madame

from the album Disincanto
- Released: 13 April 2026
- Length: 2:50
- Label: Sugar
- Songwriters: Madame; Luca Narducci; Bias; Mr. Monkey
- Producers: Bias; Mr. Monkey

Madame singles chronology
"OK" (2026)	"Rosso come il fango" (2026)	"Volevo capire" (2026)

Music video
- "Rosso come il fango" on YouTube

"Rosso come il fango" (transl. Red as mud) is a song by Italian singer and rapper Madame, released on 13 April 2026 through Sugar Music as the third single from her third studio album, Disincanto. Written by Madame and Luca Narducci, it was produced by Bias and Mr. Monkey.

The song reflects on the singer's rise to success from a modest family background, addressing the arrogance she developed after achieving recognition and the guilt she feels towards those who continue to face financial difficulties.

== Music video ==
The music video for "Rosso come il fango" was released alongside the single on Madame's official YouTube channel. It was written, directed and edited by Madame and Alberto Lonardi.

== Reception ==
Rolling Stone described the song as a confession of guilt surrounding success, noting Madame's admission of past arrogance and her dedication to "everyone who is born crooked like us". Diego Muleri of SentireAscoltare highlighted the contrast between the song's "penetrating, anguished and intense lyricism" and its restrained synth-pop production.

== Charts ==
Weekly chart performance for "Rosso come il fango"
Chart (2026)	Peak position
Italy (FIMI)	81
