= Ragazzi fuori (Clara song) =

Single by Clara

from the album Primo
- Released: 5 April 2024
- Genre: Pop
- Length: 2:56
- Label: Warner Music Italy
- Songwriters: Clara Soccini; Alessandro La Cava; Vincenzo Centrella; Stefano Lentini
- Producer: Stefano Lentini

Clara singles chronology
"Diamanti grezzi" (2024)	"Ragazzi fuori" (2024)	"Ghetto Love" (2024)

Music video
- "Ragazzi fuori" on YouTube

"Ragazzi fuori" (transl. Boys out) is a song co-written and recorded by Italian singer-songwriter Clara. It was released on 5 April 2024 by Warner Music Italy as the fifth single from her debut studio album, Primo.

== Description ==
The song was written and composed by the artist together with Alessandro La Cava, Vincenzo Centrella, and composer Stefano Lentini, who also handled the orchestration and production. The song was included on the soundtrack of the fourth season of the Italian television series Mare fuori.

The song was later included as the first track on the singer-songwriter's debut studio album, Primo, released in 2024.

== Music video ==
The lyric video for the song was released on February 16, 2024, via the Clara's YouTube channel.

== Charts ==
Weekly chart performance for "Ragazzi fuori"
Chart (2024)	Peak position
Italy (FIMI)	37
Italy Airplay (EarOne)	85

== Certifications ==
Region	Certification	Certified units/sales
Italy (FIMI)	Gold	50,000^{‡}
^{‡} Sales+streaming figures based on certification alone.
