= Maschio (song) =

2025 song by Annalisa

Single by Annalisa

from the album Ma io sono fuoco
- Released: 8 May 2025
- Genre: Pop; dance pop; italo disco; Europop
- Length: 3:24
- Label: Warner Music Italy
- Songwriters: Annalisa Scarrone; Davide Simonetta; Paolo Antonacci
- Producer: Davide Simonetta

Annalisa singles chronology
"Beatrice" (2024)	"Maschio" (2025)	"Piazza San Marco" (2025)

Music video
- "Maschio" on YouTube

"Maschio" (Italian for 'Male') is a song co-written and recorded by Italian singer-songwriter Annalisa. It was released on 8 May 2025 through Warner Music Italy as the lead single from her ninth studio album, Ma io sono fuoco.

It was written by Annalisa with co-writing contribution by the singer's long time songwriting partners Davide Simonetta and Paolo Antonacci. The song peaked at number 9 on the Italian singles chart.

== Music video ==
A music video to accompany the release of "Maschio", directed by Giulio Rosati, was released via YouTube on 9 May 2025.

== Charts ==
=== Weekly charts ===
Weekly chart performance for "Maschio"
Chart (2025)	Peak position
Italy (FIMI)	9
Italy Airplay (EarOne)	1

=== Year-end charts ===
2025 year-end chart performance for "Maschio"
Chart (2025)	Position
Italy (FIMI)	46

== Certifications ==
Certifications for "Maschio"
Region	Certification	Certified units/sales
Italy (FIMI)	Platinum	200,000^{‡}
^{‡} Sales+streaming figures based on certification alone.
