= Sangiovanni =

Italian singer-songwriter (born 2003)

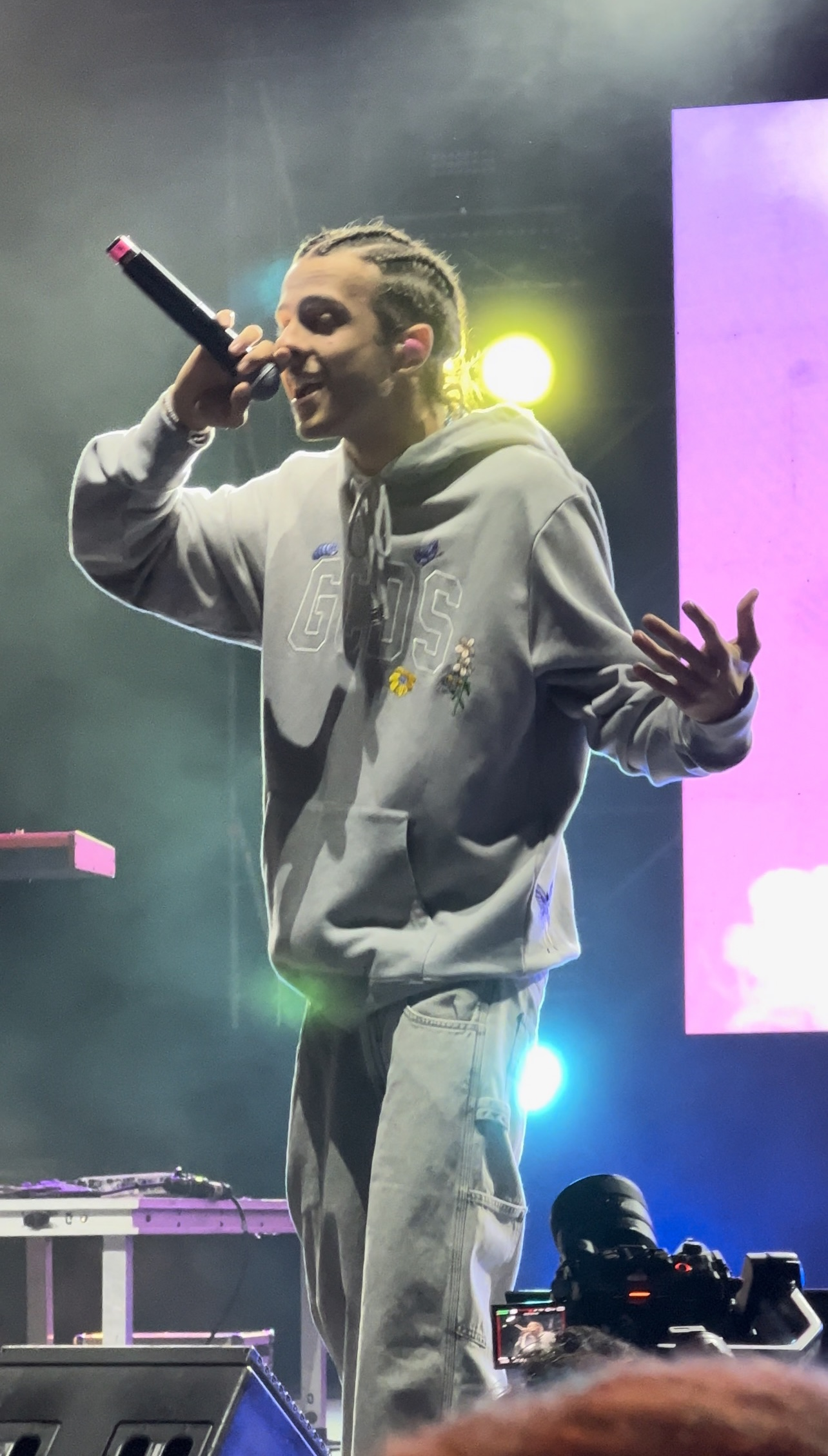
- Sangiovanni in 2023

Background information
- Born: Giovanni Pietro Damian; 9 January 2003 (age 23); Vicenza, Veneto, Italy
- Genres: Pop; urban
- Occupations: Singer; songwriter
- Instrument: Vocals
- Years active: 2020–present
- Labels: Sugar Music; Universal

Giovanni Pietro Damian (Italian pronunciation: [dʒoˈvanni ˈpjɛːtro ˈdamjan]; born Vicenza, 9 January 2003), known professionally as Sangiovanni (pronounced [san.dʒoˈvan.ni]), is an Italian singer-songwriter.

== Life and career ==
=== Early years ===
Born in 2003 in Vicenza and raised in Grumolo delle Abbadesse, Giovanni Pietro Damian is the youngest of three children of Pierluigi Damian and Lidia Guerra. He attended the Don Giuseppe Fogazzaro high school in Vicenza, which he left during his fourth year to participate in the twentieth edition of Amici di Maria De Filippi.

He became interested in music at the age of seventeen, when he began writing his first songs, partly encouraged by his friend, singer Madame. He chose the stage name Sangiovanni by simply adding "San"—short for santo (saint)—to his given name, as many people told him he "didn't look like a saint".

=== 2020–2021: Participation in Amici 20 and debut EP ===
In 2020, Sangiovanni released his first three singles—"Paranoia", "Non +", and "Guccy Bag"—under the Sugar Music label. He gained broader public attention later that year by taking part in the early stages of the twentieth edition of the talent show Amici di Maria De Filippi. He reached the final in May, finishing second overall and winning first place in the singing category. During the final, he received multiple awards, including the TIM Critics' Prize, the Radio Award, and the SIAE Award.

During his time on Amici, he released the singles "Lady", "Tutta la notte", and "Hype", which, along with his previous releases, charted on the Italian singles chart. The most successful of these was "Lady", which was certified four-times platinum by the Federazione Industria Musicale Italiana (FIMI). On 14 May 2021, he released his self-titled debut EP via Sugar Music, which debuted at number one on the Italian Albums Chart. Within two weeks, the EP was certified platinum, followed by a second platinum certification in July, a third in September, and a fourth in May of the following year, with over 200,000 units sold in Italy. The EP also entered the Swiss Albums Chart, peaking at number 34.

In the same week as the EP's release, Sangiovanni achieved his first number-one single with "Malibu". The song was the most successful track of 2021 according to FIMI, and became the most streamed song in Italy on both Spotify and Apple Music, as well as the most viewed music video of the year on Vevo.

He later released the singles "Raggi gamma" and "Perso nel buio" in collaboration with Madame, both included in the digital reissue of his EP. Sangiovanni announced his first national tour, the Sangio Live Tour, scheduled for May 2022 with nine concert dates. At the 2021 SEAT Music Awards, he received four awards in recognition of his success that year.

=== 2022: Sanremo and Cadere volare ===
In February 2022, Sangiovanni competed for the first time in the 72nd Sanremo Music Festival with the song "Farfalle", finishing in fifth place in the final ranking. A Spanish-language version of the song, titled "Mariposas" and recorded in collaboration with Spanish singer Aitana, was later released. That same year, he featured on Dance Floor, a track from Wayne Santana's album (member of Dark Polo Gang), and collaborated with Mecna and CoCo on the single "Tilt".

On 25 March 2022, he released the single "Cielo dammi la Luna" as a preview of his debut studio album, Cadere volare, which was released on 8 April. Around the same time, Forbes Italia included him in its list of Italian "under 30" figures expected to have a significant impact in the music industry. On 6 May, he released the single "Scossa", the only track from the digital reissue of Cadere volare and the third single overall from the album. The song was featured in the third season of the television series Summertime. The album reached number two on the Italian Albums Chart and was certified platinum for over 50,000 units sold.

During the summer of 2022, Sangiovanni performed at various events including the RDS Summer Festival, Jovanotti’s Jova Beach Party, TIM Summer Hits, and Battiti Live. At the TIM Music Awards, he received two awards recognizing his success throughout the year. On 7 October, he released the single "Fluo", which he later performed during the 22nd edition of Amici. In autumn, he embarked on his first arena tour in Italy, performing at Rome's Palazzetto dello Sport on 19 October and at the Mediolanum Forum in Assago on 23 October. His next single, "Mon amie freestyle", was released on 29 November.

=== 2023–2024: Second Sanremo and hiatus ===
On 10 February 2023, Sangiovanni took part in the fourth evening of the 73rd Sanremo Music Festival, dedicated to cover performances, where he duetted with contestant Ariete on "Centro di gravità permanente" by Franco Battiato. He later collaborated with Gianni Morandi on a new version of "Fatti rimandare dalla mamma a prendere il latte", performed during the same evening of the festival in celebration of the 60th anniversary of Morandi’s 1962 hit. The reinterpretation was included on Morandi's album Evviva!. In May 2023, he released the single "La fine del mondo" in collaboration with Mr. Rain, which earned double platinum certification for over 100,000 units sold. Sangiovanni also starred in the second season of Carlo Verdone's television series Vita da Carlo, portraying a fictional version of himself.

In February 2024, Sangiovanni returned as a contestant at the 74th Sanremo Music Festival with the song "Finiscimi", which served as a preview for his forthcoming album Privacy, initially scheduled for release on 1 March. Following the festival, where he finished in 29th place, he announced his decision to take a break from music to prioritize his mental health, postponing both the album release and a concert scheduled for 5 October at the Mediolanum Forum in Assago. "Finiscimi" later peaked at number 28 on the FIMI singles chart and was certified gold on 9 December.

=== 2025–present: Comeback ===
On 2 April 2025, Sangiovanni held a free concert in Rome that marked his return to the scene. He released his comeback single "Luci allo xeno" on 9 April, followed by "Veramente" on 13 June.

In 2025, he ranked tenth among the most commercially successful artists with Sanremo singles in the FIMI era.

== Personal life ==
From December 2020 to June 2023, Sangiovanni was in a relationship with dancer Giulia Stabile, winner of the twentieth edition of Amici di Maria De Filippi. She also appeared in the music video for his song "Malibu".

== Discography ==
=== Studio albums ===
List of studio albums
Title	Album details	Peak chart positions		Certifications
Title	Album details	ITA	SWI	Certifications
Cadere volare	Released: 8 April 2022; Label: Sugar Music, Universal; Format: CD, digital download, streaming	2	38	FIMI: Platinum
Tutto bene grazie	Released: 12 November 2026; Label: Sugar Music, Universal; Format: CD, digital download, streaming	49	—	

=== EPs ===
List of extended plays, with chart positions and certifications
Title	EP details	Peak chart positions		Certifications
Title	EP details	ITA	SWI	Certifications
Sangiovanni	Released: 14 May 2021; Label: Sugar Music, Universal; Format: CD, digital download, streaming	1	34	FIMI: 4× Platinum

=== Singles ===
==== As lead artist ====
List of singles as lead artist, with selected chart positions, showing year released and album name
Title	Year	Peak chart positions			Certifications	Album
Title	Year	ITA	SPA	SWI	Certifications	Album
"Paranoia"	2020	—	—	—		Non-album singles
"Non +"	2020	—	—	—		Non-album singles
"Guccy Bag"	2020	29	—	—	FIMI: Platinum	Sangiovanni
"Lady"	2021	2	—	—	FIMI: 4× Platinum	Sangiovanni
"Tutta la notte"	2021	3	—	—	FIMI: 2× Platinum	Sangiovanni
"Hype"	2021	25	—	—	FIMI: Gold	Sangiovanni
"Malibu" (solo or with Trevor Daniel)	2021	1	—	48	FIMI: 8× Platinum	Sangiovanni
"Raggi gamma"	2021	27	—	—	FIMI: Gold	Sangiovanni
"Perso nel buio" (with Madame)	2021	9	—	—	FIMI: Platinum	Sangiovanni
"Farfalle" / "Mariposas" (solo or with Aitana)	2022	2	10	24	FIMI: 6× Platinum; PROMUSICAE: 6× Platinum; IFPI SWI: Platinum	Cadere volare
"Cielo dammi la Luna"	2022	21	—	—	FIMI: Gold	Cadere volare
"Scossa"	2022	31	—	—	FIMI: Platinum	Cadere volare
"Fluo"	2022	78	—	—		Non-album single
"La fine del mondo" (with Mr. Rain)	2023	28	—	—	FIMI: 2× Platinum	Pianeta di Miller
"Americana"	2023	—	—	—		Non-album singles
"Finiscimi"	2024	28	—	—	FIMI: Gold	Non-album singles
"Luci allo xeno"	2025	—	—	—		Non-album singles
"Veramente"	2025	—	—	—		Non-album singles
"Le ragazze" (with Clara)	2026	—	—	—		Non-album singles
"—" denotes a single that did not chart or was not released.

==== As featured artist ====
List of singles, with chart positions, album name and certifications
Title	Year	Album
"Tilt" (Mecna and CoCo featuring Sangiovanni)	2022	Bromance

== Television ==
Year	Title	Role(s)	Notes
2020–2021	Amici di Maria De Filippi	Himself / Contestant	Talent show (season 20), runner-up
2022	Sanremo Music Festival 2022	Himself / Contestant	Annual music festival, 5th place with the song "Farfalle"
2023	Vita da Carlo	Himself (fictional version)	Main role (season 2)
2024	Sanremo Music Festival 2024	Himself / Contestant	Annual music festival, 29th place with the song "Finiscimi"
