= Sentimi =

Single by Madame
- Released: 24 April 2020
- Genre: Electropop
- Length: 3:07
- Label: Sugar Music
- Songwriter(s): Francesca Calearo; Bias; Francesco Barbaglia
- Producer(s): Crookers; Bias

Madame singles chronology
"Baby" (2020)	"Sentimi" (2020)	"Spaccato" (2020)

Music video
- "Sentimi" on YouTube

"Sentimi" (lit. 'Hear me' or 'Feel me') is a song by Italian rapper Madame. It was produced by Crookers and released on 24 April 2020 by Sugar Music.

== Music video ==
The lyric video for "Sentimi", directed by Thaevil and illustrated by Sindi Abazi, premiered on 30 April 2020 via Madame's YouTube channel.

== Track listing ==
Digital download
No.	Title	Writer(s)	Producer(s)	Length
1.	"Sentimi"	Francesca Calearo; Bias; Francesco Barbaglia	Crookers; Bias	3:07

== Charts ==
Chart (2020)	Peak position
Italy (FIMI)	25
