= Il mio amico (Madame song) =

Single by Madame and Fabri Fibra

from the album Madame
- Released: 15 January 2021
- Recorded: 2020
- Genre: Hip hop
- Length: 3:29
- Label: Sugar Music
- Composer(s): Bias
- Lyricist(s): Madame; Fabri Fibra
- Producer(s): Dardust; Bias

Madame singles chronology
| "Euforia" (2020) | "Il mio amico" (2021) | "Voce" (2021) |

Fabri Fibra singles chronology
| "Bataclan" (2020) | "Il mio amico" (2021) | "Propaganda" (2022) |

"Il mio amico" (transl. The friend of mine) is a song by Italian rapper and singer Madame, with featured vocals by Fabri Fibra. It was released on 15 January 2021 by Sugar Music as the third single from her debut album Madame.

== Track listing ==
Digital download
| No. | Title | Writer(s) | Producer(s) | Length |
|---|---|---|---|---|
| 1. | "Il mio amico" (featuring Fabri Fibra) | Madame; Fabri Fibra; Bias | Dardust; Bias | 3:29 |

== Charts ==
| Chart (2021) | Peak position |
|---|---|
| Italy (FIMI) | 11 |

== Certifications ==
| Region | Certification | Certified units/sales |
|---|---|---|
| Italy (FIMI) | Platinum | 70,000^{‡} |
^{‡} Sales+streaming figures based on certification alone.
