= Nero gotico =

Single by Clara

from the album Primo (digital edition only)
- Released: 13 September 2024
- Genre: Pop; electro dance
- Length: 3:04
- Label: Warner Music Italy
- Songwriters: Clara Soccini; Alessandro La Cava; Francesco Catitti
- Producer: Katoo

Clara singles chronology
"Ghetto Love" (2024)	"Nero gotico" (2024)	"Golfo x despecho" (2024)

Music video
- "Nero gotico" on YouTube

"Nero gotico" (transl. Gothic Black) is a song co-written and recorded by Italian singer-songwriter Clara, released on 13 September 2024 by Warner Music Italy. It was later included in the digital reissue of her debut studio album, Primo.

== Description ==
The song was written by the singer-songwriter herself with Alessandro La Cava, with whom she collaborated on the composition along with Francesco Catitti, aka Katoo, who also handled the programming and production. It tells the story of a toxic love, what very young people call a malaise, ironically defined as "arsenic".

== Music video ==
The music video for "Nero gotico", directed by Fabrizio Conte, was released on the same day via Clara's YouTube channel.

== Charts ==
Weekly chart performance for "Nero gotico"
Chart (2025)	Peak position
Italy (FIMI)	83
Italy Airplay (EarOne)	34
