= Disincanto (song) =

Single by Madame

from the album Disincanto
- Released: 13 March 2026
- Genre: Electropop
- Length: 3:27
- Label: Sugar
- Songwriter: Madame
- Producers: Bias; Lester Nowhere; Mr. Monkey

Madame singles chronology
"Ho fatto un sogno" (2024)	"Disincanto" (2026)	"OK" (2026)

Music video
- "Disincanto" on YouTube

"Disincanto" is a song by Italian singer and rapper Madame. It was released through Sugar Music on 13 March 2026 as the lead single from her third studio album, Disincanto.

== Background and composition ==
Written by Madame herself, the song was produced by Arturo Fratini, Matteo Novi and Nicolas Biasin, professionally known as Lester Nowhere, Mr. Monkey and Bias, respectively. Described as an electropop track, it marked Madame's return to releasing solo material after a two-year hiatus, during which she focused on songwriting and collaborations with other artists.

== Critical reception ==
Alvise Salerno of All Music Italia described the song as "electronic and full of emotional depth", praising Madame's artistic growth and emotionally impactful lyricism.

== Music video ==
The music video for "Disincanto", directed by Jacopo Farina, was released on 13 March 2026 through Madame's official YouTube channel.

== Charts ==
Weekly chart performance for "Disincanto"
Chart (2026)	Peak position
Italy (FIMI)	26
