= Diamanti grezzi =

Single by Clara

from the album Primo
- Released: 7 February 2024
- Length: 3:12
- Label: Warner
- Songwriters: Clara Soccini; Alessandro La Cava; Francesco Micarelli; Francesco "Katoo" Catitti
- Producer: Katoo

Clara singles chronology
"Boulevard" (2023)	"Diamanti grezzi" (2024)	"Ragazzi fuori" (2024)

Music video
- "Diamanti grezzi" on YouTube

"Diamanti grezzi" (transl. Rough diamonds) is a song by Italian singer-songwriter Clara. It was released on 7 February 2024 by Warner Music Italy as the fourth single from her debut studio album, Primo.

The song was Clara's entry for the Sanremo Music Festival 2024, the 74th edition of Italy's musical festival that doubles also as a selection of the act for the Eurovision Song Contest, where it placed 24th out of 30 in the grand final.

== Music video ==
The music video for "Diamanti grezzi", directed by Attilio Cusani, was released on the same day via Clara's YouTube channel.

== Charts ==
=== Weekly charts ===
Weekly chart performance for "Diamanti grezzi"
Chart (2024)	Peak position
Italy (FIMI)	12
Italy Airplay (EarOne)	45

=== Year-end charts ===
2024 year-end chart performance for "Diamanti grezzi"
Chart (2024)	Position
Italy (FIMI)	53

== Certifications ==
Region	Certification	Certified units/sales
Italy (FIMI)	Platinum	100,000^{‡}
^{‡} Sales+streaming figures based on certification alone.
