= Madame (album) =

Studio album by Madame
- Released: 19 March 2021
- Genre: Hip-hop; R&B
- Length: 46:46
- Label: Sugar Music
- Producer: 2nd Roof; Bias; Crookers; Dardust; Enrico Brun; Estremo; Garelli; Michelangelo; Mr. Monkey; Nic Sarno; Shablo; Zef

Madame chronology
| Madame (2021) | L'amore (2023) |

Singles from Madame
- 1. "Baby" Released: 28 February 2020; 2. "Clito" Released: 6 November 2020; 3. "Il mio amico" Released: 15 January 2021; 4. "Voce" Released: 3 March 2021

Singles from Madame (digital re-issue)
- 1. "Marea" Released: 4 June 2021; 2. "Tu mi hai capito" Released: 3 September 2021

Madame is the debut studio album by Italian rapper and singer-songwriter Madame. The album was released on 19 March 2021 and includes the singles "Baby", "Clito", "Il mio amico" and the 2021 Sanremo Music Festival entry "Voce".

The album includes featured guest appearances by Italian rappers Fabri Fibra, Guè, Ernia and VillaBanks, Italian band Pinguini Tattici Nucleari and Italian singers Blanco, Gaia, Rkomi and Carl Brave, as well as rapper Sfera Ebbasta in its deluxe digital edition.

On 22 March 2021, the album ranked fourth in Spotify's Top 10 Global Album Debuts.

In July 2021, the album won the Targa Tenco for Best Debut Album.

Musically, Madame is a hip-hop and R&B album, with pop, pop rap and trap elements.

== Track listing ==
Madame standard edition
| No. | Title | Lyrics | Music | Producer(s) | Length |
|---|---|---|---|---|---|
| 1. | "Istinto" | Francesca Calearo | Francesco Barbaglia | Crookers | 2:29 |
| 2. | "Voce" | Calearo | Calearo; Dario Faini; Enrico Botta | Dardust; Estremo | 3:32 |
| 3. | "Il mio amico" (featuring Fabri Fibra) | Calearo; Fabrizio Tarducci | Nicolas Biasin | Dardust; Bias | 3:30 |
| 4. | "Bugie" (featuring Rkomi and Carl Brave) | Calearo; Mirko Martorana; Carlo Coraggio | Stefano Tognini; Martorana | Zef | 2:52 |
| 5. | "Babaganoush" (featuring Pinguini Tattici Nucleari) | Calearo; Riccardo Zanotti | Zanotti; Enrico Brun | Brun | 3:08 |
| 6. | "Dimmi ora" (featuring Guè) | Calearo; Cosimo Fini | Federico Vaccari; Pietro Miano | 2nd Roof | 2:44 |
| 7. | "Clito" | Calearo | Biasin | Bias | 2:53 |
| 8. | "Mood" (featuring VillaBanks) | Calearo; Vieri Igor Traxler | Biasin | Bias | 2:32 |
| 9. | "Nuda" (featuring Ernia) | Calearo; Matteo Professione; Biasin | Calearo; Biasin | Bias | 3:18 |
| 10. | "Bamboline boliviane" | Calearo | Biasin | Bias | 2:49 |
| 11. | "Mami papi" | Calearo | Barbaglia; Pablo Miguel Lombroni Capalbo | Shablo; Crookers | 2:57 |
| 12. | "Baby" | Calearo | Barbaglia; John Lewis; Nicola Simone Polo Demaria | Crookers; Nic Sarno; Lewis | 2:33 |
| 13. | "Luna" (featuring Gaia) | Calearo; Gaia Gozzi; Jacopo Ettorre | Calearo; Matteo Novi; Tognini | Zef; Mr. Monkey | 3:06 |
| 14. | "Amiconi (freestyle)" | Calearo | Francesco Garanzini | Garelli | 2:33 |
| 15. | "Tutti muoiono" (featuring Blanco) | Calearo; Michele Zocca; Riccardo Fabbriconi | Calearo; Zocca; Fabbriconi; Novi | Mr. Monkey; Michelangelo | 3:13 |
| 16. | "Vergogna" | Calearo | Barbaglia; Bias | Crookers; Bias | 2:37 |
| Total length: | | | | | 46:46 |

Madame digital re-issue bonus tracks
| No. | Title | Lyrics | Music | Producer(s) | Length |
|---|---|---|---|---|---|
| 1. | "Tu mi hai capito" (featuring Sfera Ebbasta) | Calearo; Gionata Boschetti | Paolo Alberto Monachetti; Biasin | Bias; Charlie Charles | 3:31 |
| 2. | "Marea" | Calearo | Calearo; Biasin; Faini | Dardust; Bias | 3:14 |
| Total length: | | | | | 53:31 |

== Charts ==
=== Weekly charts ===
Weekly chart performance for Madame
| Chart (2021) | Peak position |
|---|---|
| Italian Albums (FIMI) | 1 |
| Swiss Albums (Schweizer Hitparade) | 38 |

=== Year-end charts ===
2021 year-end chart performance for Madame
| Chart (2021) | Position |
|---|---|
| Italian Albums (FIMI) | 5 |

2022 year-end chart performance for Madame
| Chart (2022) | Position |
|---|---|
| Italian Albums (FIMI) | 39 |

2023 year-end chart performance for Madame
| Chart (2023) | Position |
|---|---|
| Italian Albums (FIMI) | 91 |

== Certifications ==
Certifications for Madame
| Region | Certification | Certified units/sales |
|---|---|---|
| Italy (FIMI) | 3× Platinum | 150,000^{‡} |
^{‡} Sales+streaming figures based on certification alone.
