= Il bene nel male =

Single by Madame

from the album L'amore
- Released: 9 February 2023
- Genre: House music
- Length: 3:33
- Label: Sugar; Universal
- Composers: Francesca Calearo; Nicolas Biasin; Iacopo Sinigaglia
- Lyricist: Francesca Calearo
- Producers: Bias; Brail; Luca Faraone; Shablo

Madame singles chronology
"Caos" (2022)	"Il bene nel male" (2023)	"Aranciata" (2023)

Music video
- "Il bene nel male" on YouTube

"Il bene nel male" is a song by Italian singer-songwriter Madame. It was written by Madame with Bias and Brail, and produced by the latter two with Luca Faraone and Shablo. It was released by Sugar Music and Universal Music Italia on 9 February 2023 as the lead single from Madame's second album L'amore.

The song was the artist's entry for the Sanremo Music Festival 2023, the 73rd edition of Italy's musical festival which doubles also as a selection of the act for the Eurovision Song Contest.

== Music video ==
The music video for the song was released on YouTube on the same day of the single's release. It was directed by Martina Pastori and filmed in a villa in Brianza, Lombardy. The video also includes the participation of Italian actress Giorgia Ferrero.

== Personnel ==
Credits adapted from Tidal.

- Madame – associated performer, composer, lyricist, vocals
- Nicolas Biasin "Bias" – composer, producer
- Iacopo Sinigaglia "Brail" – composer, producer
- Luca Faraone – producer
- Shablo – producer

== Charts ==
=== Weekly charts ===
Weekly chart performance for "Il bene nel male"
Chart (2023)	Peak position
Global Excl. US (Billboard)	104
Italy (FIMI)	4
Switzerland (Schweizer Hitparade)	28

=== Year-end charts ===
Year-end chart performance for "Il bene nel male"
Chart (2023)	Position
Italy (FIMI)	20

== Certifications ==
Region	Certification	Certified units/sales
Italy (FIMI)	3× Platinum	300,000^{‡}
^{‡} Sales+streaming figures based on certification alone.
