= Baby (Madame song) =

Single by Madame

from the album Madame
- Released: 28 February 2020
- Genre: Hip hop; R&B
- Length: 2:32
- Label: Sugar Music
- Songwriter(s): Francesca Calearo; Francesco Barbaglia; John Lewis; Nicola Simone Polo Demaria
- Producer(s): Crookers; Nic Sarno; John Lewis

Madame singles chronology
"La promessa dell'anno" (2019)	"Baby" (2020)	"Sentimi" (2020)

Music video
- "Baby" on YouTube

"Baby" is a song by Italian rapper Madame. It was released on 28 February 2020 by Sugar Music as the lead single from her debut studio album Madame.

== Music video ==
The music video for "Baby", directed by Martina Pastori, premiered on 12 March 2020 via Madame's YouTube channel.

== Track listing ==
Digital download
No.	Title	Writer(s)	Producer(s)	Length
1.	"Baby"	Francesca Calearo; Francesco Barbaglia; John Lewis; Nicola Simone Polo Demaria	Crookers; Nic Sarno; Lewis	2:32

== Charts ==
Chart (2020)	Peak position
Italy (FIMI)	36

== Certifications ==
Region	Certification	Certified units/sales
Italy (FIMI)	Platinum	70,000^{‡}
^{‡} Sales+streaming figures based on certification alone.
