= Origami all'alba =

Single by Clara, Matteo Paolillo and Lolloflow

from the album Primo
- Released: 24 February 2023
- Genre: Pop
- Length: 2:33
- Label: Warner Music Italy
- Songwriters: Clara Soccini; Matteo Paolillo; Lorenzo Gennaro
- Producer: Lolloflow

Clara singles chronology
"Il tempo delle mele" (2023)	"Origami all'alba" (2023)	"Cicatrice" (2023)

Matteo Paolillo singles chronology
"Non ho voglia" (2023)	"Origami all'alba" (2023)	"Nun è cos" (2024)

Music video
- "Origami all'alba" on YouTube

"Origami all'alba" (transl. Origami at dawn) is a song by Italian singers Clara and Matteo Paolillo and Italian record producer Lolloflow. It was released on 24 February 2023 by Warner Music Italy as the lead single from Clara's debut studio album, Primo.

The song was first teased during the third season of Italian drama series The Sea Beyond, in which both Soccini and Paolillo starred.

== Description ==
The song, written by the same three artists, is produced by Lorenzo Gennaro, aka Lolloflow.

== Promotion ==
The song was previewed during the final episodes of the third season of the hit series Mare fuori.

== Music video ==
The music video, directed by Laura Days, was released on 21 April 2023 through the Clara's YouTube channel.

== Charts ==
=== Weekly charts ===
Weekly chart performance for "Origami all'alba"
Chart (2023)	Peak position
Italy (FIMI)	4
Italy Airplay (EarOne)	57

=== Year-end charts ===
2024 year-end chart performance for "Origami all'alba"
Chart (2023)	Position
Italy (FIMI)	21

== Certifications ==
Certifications for "Origami all'alba"
Region	Certification	Certified units/sales
Italy (FIMI)	4× Platinum	400,000^{‡}
^{‡} Sales+streaming figures based on certification alone.
