= Marea (song) =

Single by Madame

from the album Madame
- Released: 4 June 2021
- Genre: Calypso; samba; R&B
- Length: 3:14
- Label: Sugar Music
- Songwriters: Francesca Calearo; Dario Faini; Bias
- Producers: Dardust; Bias

Madame singles chronology
"Voce" (2021)	"Marea" (2021)	"Tu mi hai capito" (2021)

Music video
- "Marea" on YouTube

"Marea" (lit. 'Tide') is a song by Italian singer-songwriter Madame. It was produced by Dardust and Bias, and released as a single on 4 June 2021 by Sugar Music. The song was included in the digital re-issue of the debut album Madame.

== Music video ==
The music video for "Marea", directed by Attilio Cusani, premiered on 28 June 2021 via Madame's YouTube channel.

== Charts ==
=== Weekly charts ===
Weekly chart performance for "Marea"
Chart (2021)	Peak position
Italy (FIMI)	7

=== Year-end charts ===
Year-end chart performance for "Marea"
Chart (2021)	Position
Italy (FIMI)	28

== Certifications ==
Region	Certification	Certified units/sales
Italy (FIMI)	3× Platinum	210,000^{‡}
^{‡} Sales+streaming figures based on certification alone.
