= L'amore (album) =

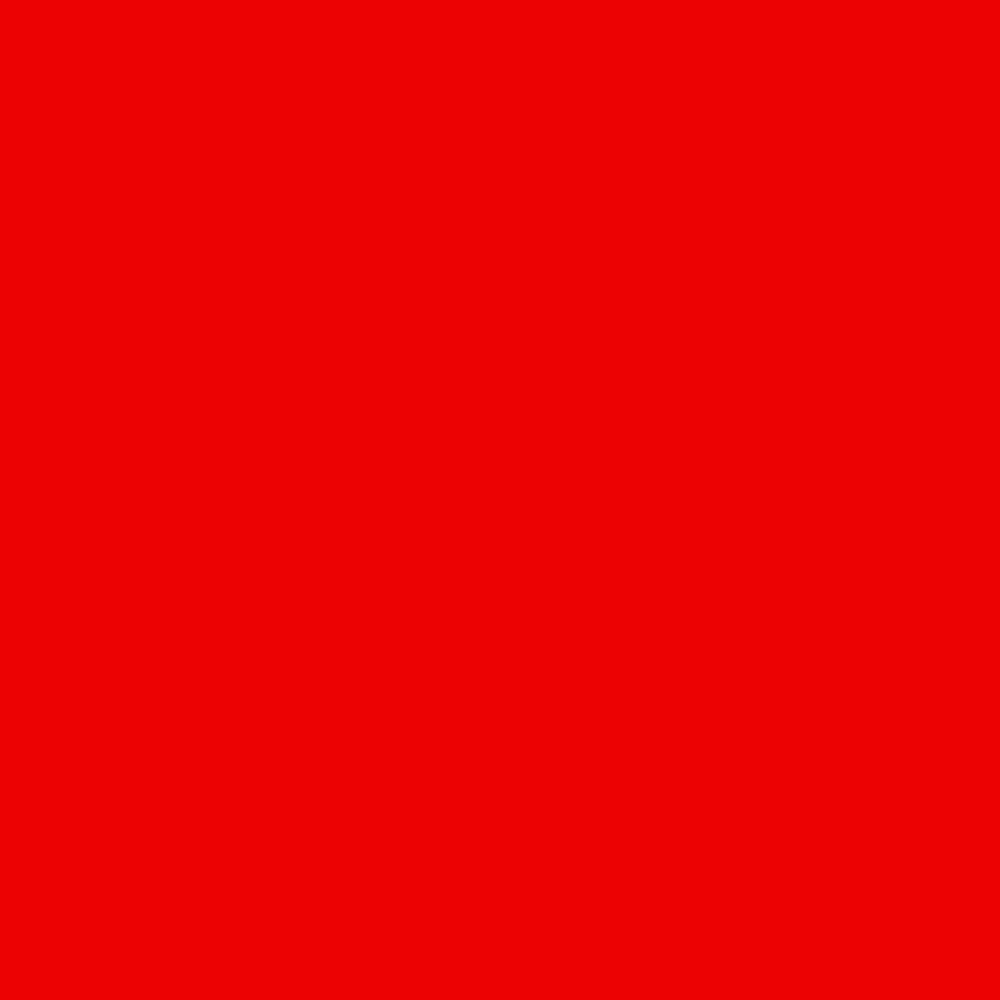

Studio album by Madame
- Released: 31 March 2023
- Genre: Pop; electro; adult contemporary
- Length: 46:11
- Label: Sugar Music
- Producer: Bias; Brail; Dardust; Luca Faraone; Antonio Filippelli; Gianmarco Manilardi; Emanuele Nazzaro; Chris Nolan; Dario Pruneddu; Shablo

Madame chronology
Madame (2021)	L'amore (2023)	Disincanto (2026)

Singles from L'amore
- 1. "Il bene nel male" Released: 9 February 2023

Singles from L'amore (digital re-issue)
- 1. "Aranciata" Released: 9 June 2023

L'amore is the second studio album by Italian singer-songwriter Madame.

The album was released on 31 March 2023 and includes the 2023 Sanremo Music Festival entry "Il bene nel male". The album peaked at number 1 of FIMI's album chart and was certified platinum in Italy.

== Track listing ==
L'amore standard edition
No.	Title	Lyrics	Music	Producer(s)	Length
1.	"Come voglio l'amore"	Francesca Calearo	Christian Mazzocchi	Chris Nolan	2:29
2.	"Il bene nel male"	Calearo	Calearo; Nicolas Biasin; Iacopo Sinigaglia	Bias; Brail; Luca Faraone; Shablo	3:33
3.	"Quanto forte ti pensavo"	Calearo	Calearo; Faraone; Pablo Miguel Lombroni Capalbo	Faraone; Shablo	3:33
4.	"Nimpha - La storia di una ninfomane"	Calearo	Calearo; Faraone; Lombroni Capalbo	Faraone; Shablo	2:58
5.	"Il mio nuovo maestro"	Calearo	Calearo; Faraone; Lombroni Capalbo	Faraone; Shablo	3:46
6.	"Donna vedi"	Calearo	Dario Pruneddu	Faraone; Pruneddu; Shablo	2:43
7.	"Pensavo a... - Skit"	Calearo	Calearo; Emanuele Nazzaro; Pruneddu	Nazzaro	1:27
8.	"La festa della cruda verità"	Calearo	Dario Faini	Dardust	3:28
9.	"Respirare"	Calearo	Calearo; Biasin	Bias; Faraone; Shablo	2:29
10.	"Milagro - A Matilde"	Calearo	Calearo; Faraone; Lombroni Capalbo	Faraone; Shablo	4:42
11.	"L'onda - La morte del marinaio"	Calearo	Faini	Dardust	3:14
12.	"Se non provo dolore"	Calearo	Calearo; Biasin	Bias; Faraone; Shablo	2:43
13.	"Per il tuo bene"	Calearo	Calearo; Faraone; Lombroni Capalbo	Faraone	4:20
14.	"Avatar - L'amore non esiste"	Calearo	Calearo; Antonio Filippelli; Gianmarco Manilardi	Filippelli; Manilardi	3:47
Total length:					46:11

L'amore digital re-issue bonus tracks
No.	Title	Lyrics	Music	Producer(s)	Length
1.	"Aranciata"	Calearo; Michele Zocca	Zocca	Michelangelo	3:14
16.	"Tekno pokè"	Calearo	Calearo; Rossella Discolo; Faraone; Nazzaro	Nazzaro	3:45
Total length:					53:16

L'amore Amazon Music edition
No.	Title	Lyrics	Music	Producer(s)	Length
1.	"Il bene nel male (Amazon Original)"	Calearo	Calearo; Biasin; Sinigaglia	Bias; Brail	3:38
2.	"Il mio nuovo maestro (Amazon Original)"	Calearo	Calearo; Faraone; Lombroni Capalbo	Faraone; Shablo	3:34
3.	"Avatar - L'amore non esiste (Amazon Original)"	Calearo	Calearo; Filippelli; Manilardi	Filippelli; Manilardi	3:21
Total length:					60:35

== Charts ==
=== Weekly charts ===
Weekly chart performance for L'amore
Chart (2023)	Peak position
Italian Albums (FIMI)	1

=== Year-end charts ===
Year-end chart performance for L'amore
Chart (2023)	Position
Italian Albums (FIMI)	32

== Certifications ==
Certifications for L'amore
Region	Certification	Certified units/sales
Italy (FIMI)	Platinum	50,000^{‡}
^{‡} Sales+streaming figures based on certification alone.
