= Primo (Clara album) =

Studio album by Clara
- Released: 16 February 2024
- Genre: Pop
- Length: 29:18
- Label: Warner Music Italy
- Producer: E.D.D.; Katoo; GRND; Juli; Kyv; Lolloflow; Massimo Colagiovanni; Shune; Starchild; Stefano Lentini

Singles from Primo
- 1. "Origami all'alba" Released: 24 February 2023; 2. "Cicatrice" Released: 27 April 2023; 3. "Boulevard" Released: 1 December 2023; 4. "Diamanti grezzi" Released: 7 February 2024; 5. "Ragazzi fuori" Released: 5 April 2024; 6. "Nero gotico" Released: 13 September 2024

Primo is the debut studio album by Italian singer-songwriter Clara, released on 16 February 2024 by Warner Music Italy.

The album featured "Diamanti grezzi", presented by the singer during the Sanremo Music Festival 2024 where it took 24th among the final ranking.

== Promotion ==
=== Singles ===
On February 24, 2023, "Origami all'alba" was released as the first single from the album, part of the soundtrack for the third season of the RAI series Mare fuori. The second single, "Cicatrice," was released on April 27, 2023.

On 1 December 2023, "Boulevard" was released as the third single from the album, with which the artist participated in the competition at Sanremo Giovani 2023, where she won. On February 7, 2024, "Diamanti grezzi" was released as the fourth single from the album that competed at the 74th Sanremo Music Festival.

The single "Ragazzi fuori", part of the soundtrack of the fourth season of the television series Mare fuori, was released on April 5, 2024 and was produced and orchestrated by composer Stefano Lentini.

On 13 September 2024, the single "Nero gotico" was released as the only extract from the digital reissue of the album.

=== Tour ===
To promote the album, the singer-songwriter went on a tour that saw her perform in various Italian clubs.

== Track listing ==
Primo track listing
No.	Title	Writer(s)	Producer(s)	Length
1.	"Ragazzi fuori"	Clara Soccini; Alessandro La Cava; Stefano Lentini; Vincenzo Centrella	Lentini	2:56
2.	"Diamanti grezzi"	Soccini; La Cava; Francesco Catitti; Francesco Micarelli	Katoo	3:12
3.	"Cicatrice"	Soccini; Julien Boverod	Juli	2:31
4.	"C'est la vie"	Soccini; Jacopo Ettorre; Luca Di Blasi; Luca Ghiazzi	Shune	3:00
5.	"Soldi, amore"	Soccini; La Cava; Centrella	Kyv	2:57
6.	"Aquiloni"	Jacopo Rossetto; Leo Einaudi	GRND	3:03
7.	"Sogni di carta"	Soccini; Gianmarco Grande; Riccardo Schiara	GRND	3:08
8.	"Storie di rose appassite"	Soccini; La Cava; Simone Capurro	Starchild	3:03
9.	"Boulevard"	Soccini; Daniele Magro	E.D.D.; Massimo Colagiovanni	2:55
10.	"Origami all'alba" (with Matteo Paolillo and Lolloflow)	Soccini; Matteo Paolillo; Lorenzo Gennaro	Lolloflow	2:33

Bonus track on the streaming re-release
No.	Title	Writer(s)	Producer(s)	Length
1.	"Nero gotico"	Soccini; La Cava; Catitti	Katoo	3:04

== Charts ==
=== Weekly charts ===
Chart performance for Primo
Chart (2024)	Peak position
Italian Albums (FIMI)	6

=== Year-end charts ===
Year-end chart performance for Primo
Chart	Year	Position
Italian Albums (FIMI)	2024	59

== Certifications ==
Region	Certification	Certified units/sales
Italy (FIMI)	Gold	25,000^{‡}
^{‡} Sales+streaming figures based on certification alone.
