= Febbre (song) =

Single by Clara
- Language: Italian
- Released: 12 February 2025
- Genre: Dance-pop
- Length: 3:12
- Label: Warner Music Italy
- Songwriters: Clara Soccini; Jacopo Ettorre; Francesca Calearo; Federica Abbate; Dario Faini
- Producer: Dardust

Clara singles chronology
"Golfo x despecho" (2024)	"Febbre" (2025)	"Scelte stupide" (2025)

Music video
- "Febbre" on YouTube

"Febbre" ("Fever") is a song co-written and recorded by Italian singer-songwriter Clara, released by Warner Music Italy on 12 February 2025. It competed during the Sanremo Music Festival 2025, placing 27th in the final rank.

== Music video ==
A music video of "Febbre", directed by Fabrizio Conte, was released on 12 February 2025 via Clara's YouTube channel.

== Charts ==
Chart performance for "Febbre"
Chart (2025)	Peak position
Italy (FIMI)	23
Italy Airplay (EarOne)	54
