= Lady (Sangiovanni song) =

2021 song by Sangiovanni

- Official cover

Single by Sangiovanni

from the EP Sangiovanni
- Language: Italian
- Released: 20 January 2021
- Length: 2:36
- Label: Sugar; Universal
- Songwriters: Sangiovanni; Alessandro La Cava
- Producer: Zef

Sangiovanni singles chronology
"Guccy Bag" (2020)	"Lady" (2021)	"Tutta la notte" (2021)

"Lady" is a 2021 song by Italian singer Sangiovanni. It was released by Sugar Music and Universal on 20 January 2021 as the second single from his debut EP Sangiovanni.

The single was released during Sangiovanni's participation at the talent show Amici di Maria De Filippi and immediately went viral on TikTok.

The song peaked at number 2 on the Italian singles chart and was certified quadruple platinum in Italy.

== Charts ==
=== Weekly charts ===
Weekly chart performance for "Lady"
Chart (2021)	Peak position
Italy (FIMI)	2

=== Year-end charts ===
Year-end chart performance for "Lady"
Chart (2021)	Position
Italy (FIMI)	9

== Certifications ==
Region	Certification	Certified units/sales
Italy (FIMI)	4× Platinum	280,000^{‡}
^{‡} Sales+streaming figures based on certification alone.
