= 17 (Madame song) =

Single by Madame
- Released: 17 June 2019
- Genre: Hip hop
- Length: 2:28
- Label: Sugar Music
- Songwriter(s): Francesca Calearo; Gabriele Mengarelli; Giorgio Arcella
- Producer(s): Eiemgei; Mago Del Blocco

Madame singles chronology
"Sciccherie" (2018)	"17" (2019)	"Mira" (2019)

Music video
- "17" on YouTube

"17" is a song by Italian rapper Madame. It was released on 17 June 2019 by Sugar Music, and produced by Eiemgei and Mago Del Blocco.

In December 2020, the song was certified gold by the Federation of the Italian Music Industry, denoting 35,000 equivalent units in Italy. By 31 August 2022, the music video on YouTube has gathered more than 10 million views.

== Music video ==
The music video for "17", directed by Dalilù, premiered on 26 June 2019 via Madame's YouTube channel.

== Track listing ==
Digital download
No.	Title	Writer(s)	Producer(s)	Length
1.	"17"	Francesca Calearo; Gabriele Mengarelli; Giorgio Arcella	Eiemgei; Mago Del Blocco	2:28

== Certifications ==
Region	Certification	Certified units/sales
Italy (FIMI)	Gold	35,000^{‡}
^{‡} Sales+streaming figures based on certification alone.
