= Sciccherie =

Single by Madame
- Released: 14 December 2018
- Genre: Hip hop
- Length: 3:12
- Label: Sugar Music
- Songwriter(s): Francesca Calearo; Giorgio Arcella
- Producer(s): Eiemgei

Madame singles chronology
"Anna" (2018)	"Sciccherie" (2018)	"17" (2019)

Music video
- "Sciccherie" on YouTube

"Sciccherie" is a song by Italian rapper Madame. It was released on 14 December 2018 by Sugar Music as Madame's debut release with a major label at the age of 16.

The song received airplay from Italian major radio networks, including Radio DeeJay. In August 2019, Cristiano Ronaldo posted an Instagram story on his account, with a video of himself listening to "Sciccherie" while on his home's terrace. Ronaldo's story attracted media attention on the song, leading several media to talk about Madame's music for the first time. In April 2020, the song was certified gold by the Federation of the Italian Music Industry, denoting 35,000 equivalent units in Italy, and reached the platinum certification (70,000 units) in September 2021.

On Klamour, Gabriele Zangarini compared her voice in "Sciccherie" to Veronica Lucchesi of La Rappresentante di Lista, describing it as "sometimes enraged, then whispered, often theatrical".

== Music video ==
The music video for "Sciccherie", directed by Dalilù, premiered on 21 December 2021 via Madame's YouTube channel. By 28 February 2024, the music video on YouTube has gathered more than 18 million views.

== Track listing ==
Digital download
No.	Title	Writer(s)	Producer(s)	Length
1.	"Sciccherie"	Francesca Calearo; Giorgio Arcella	Eiemgei	3:12

== Certifications ==
Region	Certification	Certified units/sales
Italy (FIMI)	Platinum	70,000^{‡}
^{‡} Sales+streaming figures based on certification alone.

== Cover versions ==
A cover version of the song was performed by contestant Blue Phelix during the second live show of the fourteenth season of X Factor Italy.
