= Voce (song) =

Single by Madame

from the album Madame
- Released: 3 March 2021
- Recorded: 2020
- Genre: R&B; electro
- Length: 3:31
- Label: Sugar Music
- Composer(s): Francesca Calearo; Dario Faini; Enrico Botta
- Lyricist(s): Francesca Calearo
- Producer(s): Dardust; Estremo

Madame singles chronology
| "Il mio amico" (2021) | "Voce" (2021) | "Marea" (2021) |

Music video
- "Voce" on YouTube

"Voce" (lit. 'Voice') is a song by Italian rapper and singer-songwriter Madame. It was released on 3 March 2021 by Sugar Music as the fourth single from her debut album Madame.

The song premiered on the first evening of the Sanremo Music Festival 2021. It ranked eighth at the end of the competition, and was awarded with the "Sergio Bardotti" Award for Best Lyrics and the "Premio Lunezia" for its musical and literary value.

On 13 July 2021, "Voce" won the Targa Tenco for Best Song.

== Music video ==
The music video for "Voce", directed by Attilio Cusani, was released after the Sanremo premiere via Madame's YouTube channel.

== Charts ==
=== Weekly charts ===
Weekly chart performance for "Voce"
| Chart (2021) | Peak position |
|---|---|
| Global Excl. U.S. (Billboard) | 146 |
| Italy (FIMI) | 2 |
| Italy Airplay (EarOne) | 6 |
| Switzerland (Schweizer Hitparade) | 92 |

=== Year-end charts ===
Year-end chart performance for "Voce"
| Chart (2021) | Position |
|---|---|
| Italy (FIMI) | 10 |

== Certifications ==
| Region | Certification | Certified units/sales |
|---|---|---|
| Italy (FIMI) | 4× Platinum | 280,000^{‡} |
^{‡} Sales+streaming figures based on certification alone.
