= Farfalle (song) =

Single by Sangiovanni

from the album Cadere volare
- Language: Italian
- English title: "Butterflies"
- Released: 3 February 2022 (original); 3 June 2022 (Spanish version)
- Genre: Dance-pop
- Length: 2:44
- Label: Sugar Music; Universal
- Songwriters: Alessandro La Cava; Giovanni Pietro Damian; Stefano Tognini
- Producers: Zef; Ítaca

Sangiovanni singles chronology
"Perso nel buio" (2021)	"Farfalle" (2022)	"Tilt" (2022)

Aitana singles chronology
"Las dudas" (2022)	"Mariposas" (2022)

Alternative cover
- Spanish duet cover

"Farfalle" (English: "Butterflies") is a song recorded by Italian singer Sangiovanni. Produced by Zef and Ítaxa, the song was released as a single on 3 February 2022, and included in his debut album Cadere volare (2022). The song competed in the Sanremo Music Festival 2022, placing fourth in a field of twenty five. Despite not winning, "Farfalle" became a hit in Italy, peaking at number two in the country. The song would later appear in the 2022 dance-rhythm game Just Dance 2023 Edition as an Italian exclusive.

A duet version in Spanish, "Mariposas", featuring Aitana and additional production by Andrés Torres and Mauricio Rengifo, was released on 3 June 2022, and peaked at number ten in Spain.

== Background ==
Sangiovanni began to tease "Farfalle" on social media in December 2021 and officially announced its release on 13 January. Co-written by himself, he explained upon released that:

I had so few butterflies in my stomach that I decided to put them in one piece, so at least I had them somewhere. When I wrote this song I was in a difficult moment, I was a victim of a short time and a lot of chaos that exists in this world today. I wanted a song to stop this, so I wrote it. I wanted a breath of air, the breath I need.

— Sangiovanni on the song and inspiration, Radio Kiss Kiss

== Music video ==
An accompanying music video directed by LateMilk was released on the singer's YouTube channel on 3 February.

== Duet version ==
A duet version of "Farfalle" with Spanish singer Aitana translated into the Spanish language was announced on social media on 1 June and released two days later under the title "Mariposas". An accompanying music video directed by Héctor Merce was released on YouTube the same day.

== Track listing ==
Original version
No.	Title	Length
1.	"Farfalle"	2:44

Duet
No.	Title	Length
1.	"Mariposas" (with Aitana)	2:34

== Charts ==
=== Weekly charts ===
Weekly chart performance for "Farfalle/Mariposas"
Chart (2022)	Peak position
Italy (FIMI)	2
Spain (PROMUSICAE)	10
Switzerland (Schweizer Hitparade)	24

=== Year-end charts ===
Year-end chart performance for "Farfalle"/"Mariposas"
Chart (2022)	Position
Italy (FIMI)	4
Spain (PROMUSICAE)	25

== Certifications ==
Region	Certification	Certified units/sales
Italy (FIMI)	6× Platinum	600,000^{‡}
Spain (PROMUSICAE)	6× Platinum	360,000^{‡}
Switzerland (IFPI Switzerland)	Platinum	20,000^{‡}
^{‡} Sales+streaming figures based on certification alone.

== Release history ==
Country	Date	Version	Format	Label
Various	3 February 2022	Original	Digital download; streaming	Sugar · Universal
Italy	11 March 2022	Original	Contemporary hit radio	Universal
Various	3 June 2022	Duet	Digital download; streaming	Universal
Spain	19 June 2022	Duet	Contemporary hit radio	Universal
