= Clito (song) =

Single by Madame

from the album Madame
- Released: 6 November 2020
- Recorded: 2020
- Genre: Urban
- Length: 2:52
- Label: Sugar Music
- Composer(s): Francesca Calearo; Bias
- Lyricist(s): Francesca Calearo
- Producer(s): Bias

Madame singles chronology
"Nuove strade" (2020)	"Clito" (2020)	"Euforia" (2020)

"Clito" (lit. 'Clit') is a song by Italian rapper Madame. It was released on 6 November 2020 by Sugar Music as the second single from her debut album Madame.

== Description ==
The song is dedicated to the clitoris, and was described as a provocative "feminist manifesto". According to Jessica Mandalà of hip-hop magazine Rapologia, the song is about "the helplessness that we have all felt at least once in front of events that cannot be controlled."

Commenting on the lyrics, Madame said: "it's like life is fucking me and killing me. I represented my suffering as painters do"; she also stated that "it is right for a young girl to understand that even women can talk about everything, with a musical genre that allows them to do so".

== Track listing ==
Digital download
No.	Title	Producer(s)	Length
1.	"Clito"	Bias	2:52

== Charts ==
Chart (2021)	Peak position
Italy (FIMI)	47
