= Tu mi hai capito =

Single by Madame featuring Sfera Ebbasta

from the album Madame
- Released: 3 September 2021
- Recorded: 2021
- Genre: Trap
- Length: 3:31
- Label: Sugar Music
- Songwriters: Francesca Calearo; Gionata Boschetti; Bias; Paolo Alberto Monachetti
- Producers: Bias; Charlie Charles

Madame singles chronology
"Marea" (2021)	"Tu mi hai capito" (2021)	"La strega del frutteto" (2021)

Sfera Ebbasta singles chronology
"Mi fai impazzire" (2021)	"Tu mi hai capito" (2021)	"Mi piace" (2021)

"Tu mi hai capito" (lit. 'You understood me') is a song by Italian rapper and singer-songwriter Madame, with featured vocals by Italian rapper Sfera Ebbasta. The song was released as a single on 3 September 2021 and was included in the digital re-issue of the debut album Madame.

A French version featuring Hatik, entitled "Tu m'as compris", was released on 28 January 2022.

== Charts ==
=== Weekly charts ===
Weekly chart performance for "Tu mi hai capito"
Chart (2021)	Peak position
Italy (FIMI)	2
San Marino (SMRRTV Top 50)	20

=== Year-end charts ===
2021 year-end chart performance for "Tu mi hai capito"
Chart (2021)	Position
Italy (FIMI)	40

2022 year-end chart performance for "Tu mi hai capito"
Chart (2022)	Position
Italy (FIMI)	90

== Certifications ==
Region	Certification	Certified units/sales
Italy (FIMI)	4× Platinum	400,000^{‡}
^{‡} Sales+streaming figures based on certification alone.
