= Defuera =

Single by Dardust featuring Ghali, Madame and Marracash
- Released: 15 July 2020
- Genre: Latin pop; urban
- Length: 3:20
- Label: Island
- Songwriters: Dario Faini; Davide Petrella; Ghali Amdouni; Francesca Calearo; Fabio Rizzo
- Producer: Dardust

Dardust singles chronology
"S.A.D." (2020)	"Defuera" (2020)	"Beautiful Solitude" (2020)

Ghali singles chronology
"Good Times" (2020)	"Defuera" (2020)	"Barcellona" (2020)

Madame singles chronology
"Fck U" (2020)	"Defuera" (2020)	"Nuove strade" (2020)

Marracash singles chronology
"Sport - I muscoli" (2020)	"Defuera" (2020)	"Fantasmi" (2021)

Music video
- "Defuera" on YouTube

"Defuera" is a song by Italian record producer Dardust featuring vocals from Italian recording artists Ghali, Madame and Marracash. It was released on 15 July 2020 by Island Records.

== Music video ==
The music video for "Defuera", directed by YouNuts! and Bendo, premiered on 17 July 2020 via Durdust's YouTube channel.

== Charts ==
Chart performance for "Defuera"
Chart (2020)	Peak position
Italy (FIMI)	33

== Certifications ==
Certification for "Defuera"
Region	Certification	Certified units/sales
Italy (FIMI)	Platinum	70,000^{‡}
^{‡} Sales+streaming figures based on certification alone.
