= Disincanto (Madame album) =

Studio album by Madame
- Released: 16 April 2026
- Length: 42:20
- Label: Sugar
- Producers: Bias; Lester Nowhere; Mr. Monkey; Oddsphere

Madame chronology
L'amore (2023)	Disincanto (2026)

Singles from Disincanto
- 1. "Disincanto" Released: 13 March 2026; 2. "OK" Released: 27 March 2026; 3. "Rosso come il fango" Released: 13 April 2026; 4. "Volevo capire" Released: 17 April 2026; 5. "M'ama non m'ama" Released: 19 June 2026

Disincanto is the third studio album by Italian singer and rapper Madame, released on 16 April 2026 through Sugar.

The album marked Madame's return after a three-year hiatus following the release of L'amore (2023). The album was announced along with the release of the lead single "Disincanto" on 13 March 2026. It includes collaborations with Marracash, 6occia, Nerissima Serpe and Papa V.

== Critical reception ==
Writing for Rockol, Claudio Cabona described the album as a work that consolidates and expands the artistic traits of Madame's previous releases, praising its emotional honesty and lyrical themes dealing with disillusionment, identity and personal growth.

== Track listing ==
No.	Title	Length
1.	"Disincanto"	3:28
2.	"Come stai?"	3:23
3.	"Volevo capire" (featuring Marracash)	2:37
4.	"OK"	2:47
5.	"Invidiosa"	2:57
6.	"Mai più"	4:01
7.	"No Pressure"	2:30
8.	"Bestia"	2:37
9.	"Puttana svizzera" (featuring Nerissima Serpe, Papa V and 6occia)	3:22
10.	"Rosso come il fango"	2:50
11.	"Non mi tradire"	3:19
12.	"Allucinazioni"	3:20
13.	"La persona peggiore del mondo"	2:19
14.	"Grazie"	2:55

Digital re-issue
No.	Title	Length
1.	"M'ama non m'ama"	2:32

== Charts ==
Weekly chart performance for Disincanto
Chart (2026)	Peak position
Italian Albums (FIMI)	2
Swiss Albums (Schweizer Hitparade)	31

== Certifications ==
Certifications for Disincanto
Region	Certification	Certified units/sales
Italy (FIMI)	Platinum	200,000^{‡}
^{‡} Sales+streaming figures based on certification alone.
