= Clara (singer) =

Italian singer-songwriter, actress and model (born 1999)

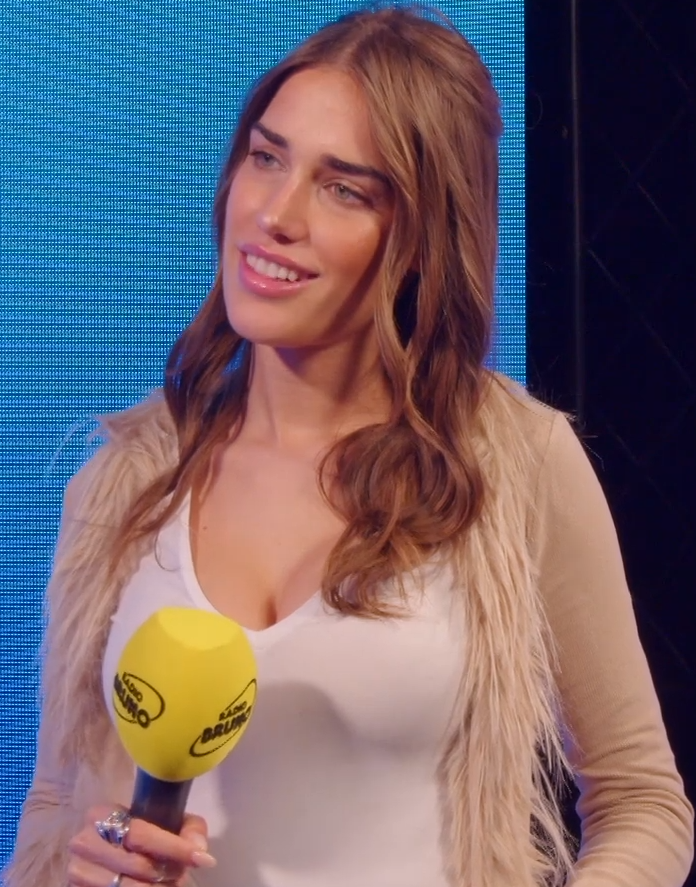
- Clara at the Sanremo Music Festival 2025

Background information
- Born: Clara Soccini; 25 October 1999 (age 26); Varese, Italy
- Origin: Travedona-Monate, Varese, Italy
- Genres: Pop; urban
- Occupations: Singer; songwriter; actress; model
- Instruments: Vocals; piano
- Works: Discography
- Years active: 2020–present
- Labels: RCA (2020–2021); Columbia (2021–2022); Warner Music Italy (2023–present); Atlantic Italy (2025–present)

Clara Soccini (born 25 October 1999), known professionally by the mononym Clara, is an Italian singer-songwriter, actress and model.

After gaining recognition for her role as Crazy J in the teen drama television series The Sea Beyond (2023–2024), she won the Sanremo Giovani song contest with the song "Boulevard", gaining the opportunity to compete in the Sanremo Music Festival 2024 with the song "Diamanti grezzi".

== Early life ==
Soccini grew up in Travedona-Monate, a small town near Lake Maggiore, Lombardy. She was raised by her mother after her parents separated in her childhood. She has a younger brother, Filippo. At the age of 16, while attending a liceo linguistico of the "Alessandro Manzoni" State Higher Institute in Varese, Soccini began working as a model in Milan.

== Career ==
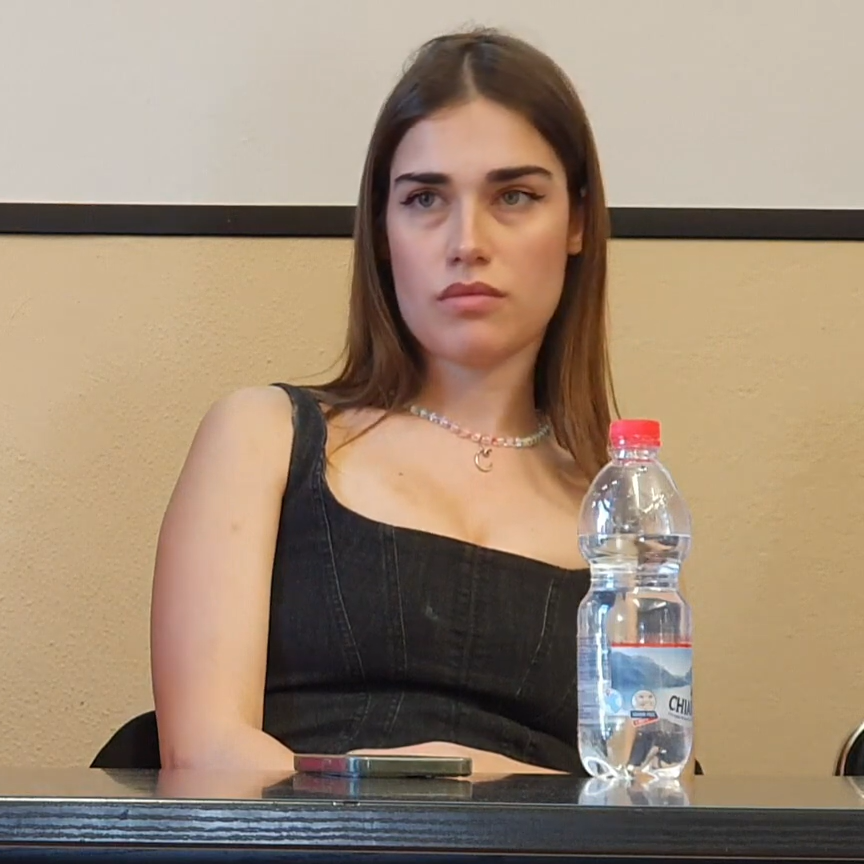
Clara in 2023

In 2020, Soccini began her music career and was featured on the song "Io e te" by Nicola Siciliano. She subsequently released three singles: "Freak", "Ammirò", and "Bilico" in 2020 and 2021.

In early 2023, Soccini made her acting debut as Crazy J on the teen drama television series The Sea Beyond after being approached by the series' director. Later that year, she won the Sanremo Giovani song contest with her song "Boulevard", earning her a spot in the Sanremo Music Festival 2024 where she performed "Diamanti grezzi", placing 24th. Following Sanremo, Clara was featured on Icy Subzero's single "Ghetto Love", released on 31 May 2024. On 13 September 2024, she released the single "Nero gotico", ahead of the Primo tour in October 2024.

In December 2024, Clara was announced as one of the participants in the Sanremo Music Festival 2025. She placed 27th with the song "Febbre".

== Discography ==
- Primo (2024)

== Filmography ==
=== Television ===
| Year | Title | Role | Notes | Ref. |
|---|---|---|---|---|
| 2023–2024 | The Sea Beyond | Giulia / Crazy J | Main cast (seasons 3–4) | |
| 2024 | Sanremo Music Festival 2024 | Contestant | Annual music festival | |
| 2025 | Sanremo Music Festival 2025 | Contestant | Annual music festival | |
| 2025 | GialappaShow | Co-host | Episode: "Season 6, episode 6" | |

== Accolades ==
| Award | Year | Category | Nominated work | Result | Ref. |
|---|---|---|---|---|---|
| Billboard Italia Women in Music | 2024 | Rising Star | Herself | Won | |
| Lunezia Award | 2023 | Musical-literaire Award | "Boulevard" | Won | |
| Sanremo Music Festival | 2024 | Enzo Janacci Award for Best Performance | "Diamanti grezzi" | Won | |
| SIAE Rome Award | 2024 | Best Video | "Diamanti grezzi" | Won | |
| TIM Music Awards | 2023 | Multiplatinum Single | "Origami all'alba" | Won | |
