= Madame (singer) =

Italian singer-songwriter and rapper (born 2002)

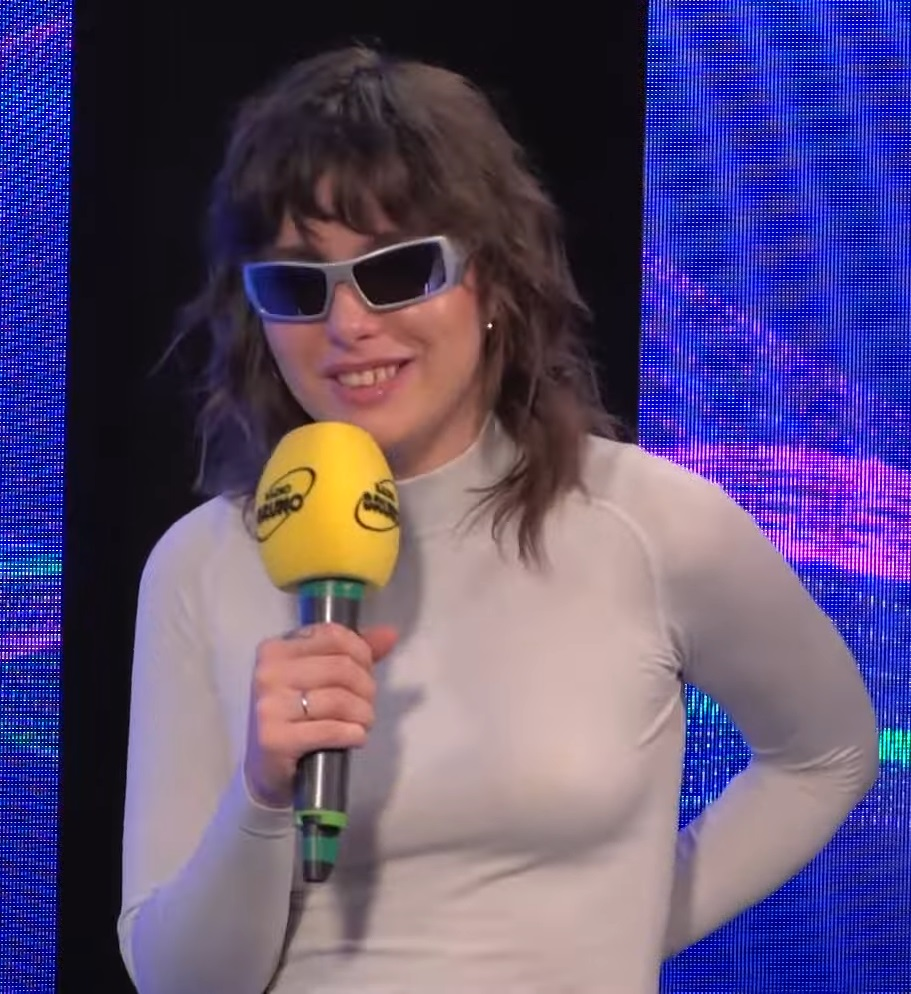
- Madame in 2023

Background information
- Born: Francesca Calearo; 16 January 2002 (age 24); Vicenza, Italy
- Origin: Creazzo, Italy
- Genres: R&B; hip hop; trap; pop; urban
- Occupations: Singer; songwriter; rapper
- Years active: 2018–present
- Label: Sugar

Francesca Calearo (born 16 January 2002), known professionally as Madame, is an Italian singer-songwriter and rapper.

After signing a recording contract with Sugar Music at age 16, she gained popularity in August 2019, when her single "Sciccherie" was shared by Cristiano Ronaldo on his Instagram profile. Between 2019 and 2020, she released several singles as lead artist and collaborations with, among others, Marracash, Negramaro, DRD, Ghali, Ensi, and producer Chris Nolan. In March 2021 she competed in the 71st Sanremo Music Festival. Her entry "Voce", which earned her one of the most streams artist in Amazon Music Italy in 2021 alongside Cos Mass, Mahmood and Alessandra Amoroso as well as the single "Il mio amico" recorded with Fabri Fibra, were included in her debut album Madame, released on 19 March 2021.

== Biography ==
Francesca Calearo was born in Vicenza on 16 January 2002 and grew up in the town of Creazzo. As a child, she developed an interest in music thanks to her father, an amateur musician with an interest in Italian singer-songwriters. Being influenced by artists like Ludovico Einaudi, Calearo started taking piano lessons in middle school, and later continued to study music as an autodidact. She studied Human Sciences at the liceo Don Giuseppe Fogazzaro in Vicenza. She chose the pseudonym "Madame" after trying a random generator for drag queen names, which yielded the result "Madame Wild" for Calearo. She found it represented the idea of "elegance and sophistication" she wanted to pursue, as well as her will to be "a Woman with capital W".

Madame's debut single, "Anna", was produced by rapper Eiemgei and released in September 2018 by Arcade Army Records. At the age of 16, she signed a recording contract with Sugar Music, whom released her second single "Sciccherie" on 14 December 2018. The song received airplay from Italian radio networks including Radio DeeJay. In August 2019, Cristiano Ronaldo posted an Instagram story on his account with a video of himself listeing to "Sciccherie" on his home's terrace. Ronaldo's story attracted media attention to the song, leading several outlets to talk about Madame's music for the first time.

The singles "17", "La promessa dell'anno", "Baby", "Sentimi" and "Clito" were also released between 2019 and 2020. In late 2019, Madame appeared on the album Persona by Italian rapper Marracash, performing as a featured artist in the track named after her pseudonym. In the summer of 2020, producer DRD released the single "Defuera", with vocals by Ghali, Marracash and Madame. She also recorded the song "Non è vero niente" with Italian rock band Negramaro, which was included in their album Contatto in late 2020.

According to D: La repubblica delle donne (lit. 'D: The republic of women'), a magazine attached to the newspaper la Repubblica, in 2020 Madame was among the fifty candidates for the title of "Italian Woman of the Year".

Madame made her first appearance on Italian television on 3 December 2020, when she opened the semi-final of the fourteenth season of The X Factor on Sky TV, singing her song "Baby" in a duet with contestant Blind. The following week, on 10 December, she was again a guest of the show, performing "Non è vero niente" with Negramaro.

In March 2021, Madame competed in the 71st Sanremo Music Festival, performing the song "Voce". She became the first female rapper to compete in the contest's main section, and the youngest singer among the established artists competing in the 2021 contest. During the festival she came out as bisexual. Her entry "Voce" was included in her self-titled debut album, released on 19 March 2021. The album was preceded by the single "Il mio amico", featuring Italian rapper Fabri Fibra and released in January 2021. The album and the song "Voce" were respectively awarded a Targa Tenco for Best Debut Album and Best Song. Two new songs, entitled "Marea" and "Tu mi hai capito", were released as singles on 4 July and 3 September 2021 respectively, and later added to the digital version of her debut album.

Madame participated in the Sanremo Music Festival 2023 with the song "Il bene nel male". At the festival, she also performed a duet with Izi of Fabrizio De André's "Via del Campo". Madame co-authored with Angelina Mango and Dardust "La noia", Mango's winning entry in the Sanremo Music Festival 2024.

== Musical style ==
Among her influences, Madame cites singer-songwriter Fabrizio De André, trap music and, despite not having southern Italian origins, Sicilian neomelodic music. Instrumental music also played an important role in her artistic development, with artists such as Ludovico Einaudi and Van Halen.

In 2019, her musical style was described by la Repubblica as "urban, a very wide container in which trap and rap can merge, together with several other contemporary sounds". Claudio Cabona wrote for Rockol.it that Madame's lyrical style is sometimes "visceral", and "sometimes very explicit, without being banal". He added that all her songs are characterized by very particular voice sounds. On Klamour, Gabriele Zangarini compared her voice in "Sciccherie" to La Rappresentante di Lista, describing it as "sometimes enraged, then whispered, often theatrical".

== Discography ==
- Madame (2021)
- L'amore (2023)
- Disincanto (2026)

== Television programs ==
Year	Title	Role	Notes
2020	X Factor	Musical guest	Season 14, episodes 6 and 7
2021	Sanremo Music Festival 2021	Contestant	8th place, Best Lyrics Award
2021	Le Iene	Guest host	Season 25
2023	Sanremo Music Festival 2023	Contestant	7th place
