= Angelina Mango discography =

Discography of Italian singer-songwriter Angelina Mango

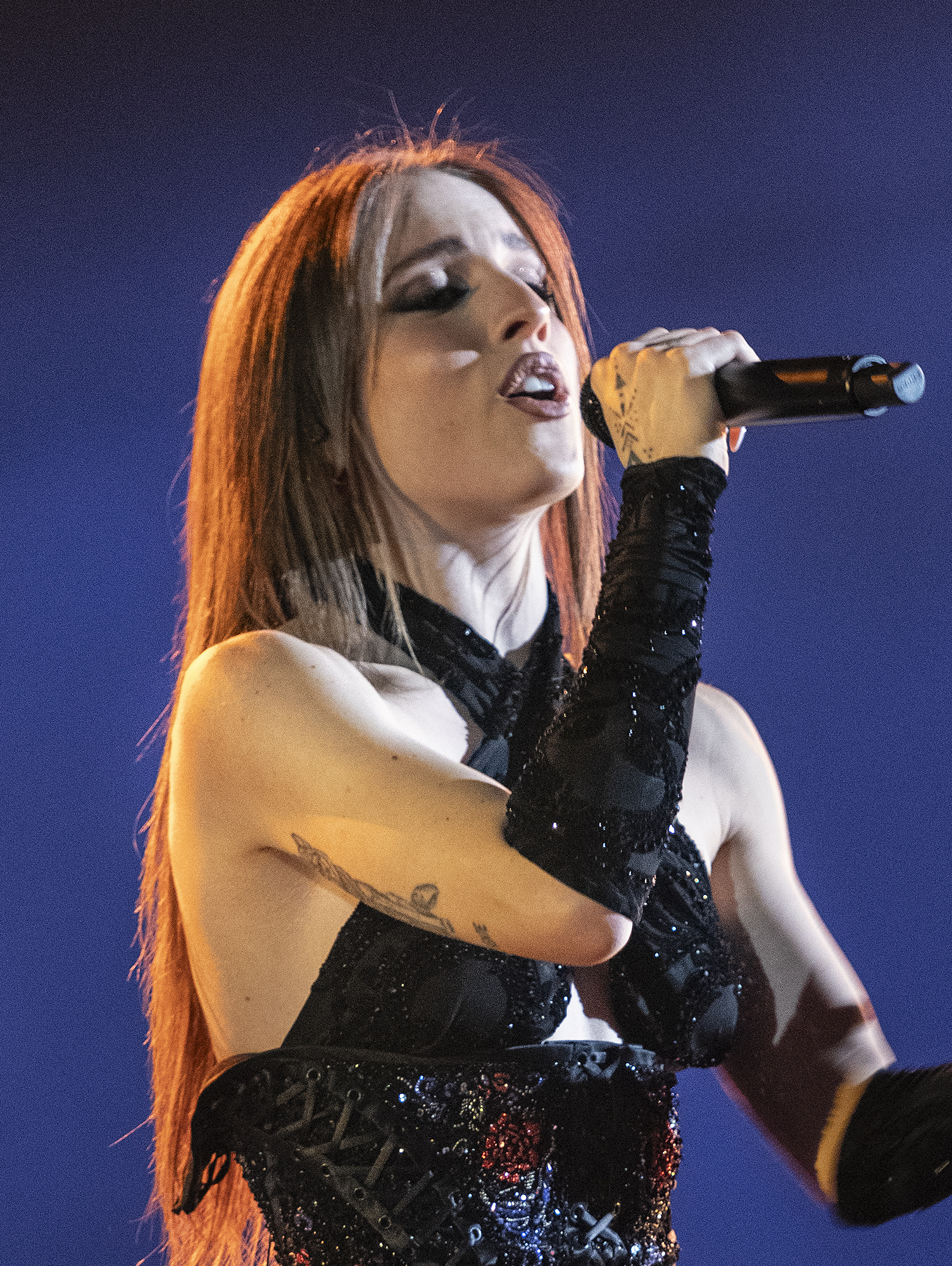
- Angelina Mango at the Eurovision Song Contest 2024
- Studio albums: 2
- EPs: 2
- Singles: 16

The discography of Italian singer-songwriter Angelina Mango consists of two studio albums, two extended plays and sixteen singles. She has topped the Italian music charts on twice occasions—once with a single and once with a studio album—and has earned numerous certifications from the FIMI, selling over one million records in Italy alone.

Angelina Mango has received 15 platinum and 4 gold certifications from FIMI.

== Studio albums ==
List of studio albums, with details and chart positions
Title	Details	Peak chart positions	Certifications
Title	Details	ITA	Certifications
Poké melodrama	Released: 31 May 2024; Label: LaTarma, Warner Music Italy; Format: CD, LP, MC, digital download, streaming	1	FIMI: Platinum
Caramé	Released: 16 October 2025; Label: LaTarma, Warner Music Italy; Format: CD, LP, digital download, streaming	4	

== Extended plays ==
List of extended plays, with chart positions and certifications
Title	Details	Peak chart positions	Certifications
Title	Details	ITA	Certifications
Monolocale	Released: 13 November 2020; Label: Disincanto; Format: CD, digital download, streaming	―	
Voglia di vivere	Released: 19 May 2023; Label: 21co, BMG; Format: CD, digital download, streaming	2	FIMI: Platinum
"—" denotes a recording that did not chart or was not released.

== Singles ==
=== As lead artist ===
List of singles as lead artist, with selected chart positions, showing year released and album name
Title	Year	Peak chart positions								Certifications	Album or EP
Title	Year	ITA	AUT	IRE	LTU	NLD	SWE	SWI	WW	Certifications	Album or EP
"Va tutto bene"	2020	—	—	—	—	—	—	—	—		Monolocale
"Formica"	2022	—	—	—	—	—	—	—	—		Non-album singles
"Walkman"	2022	—	—	—	—	—	—	—	—		Non-album singles
"Rituali"	2022	—	—	—	—	—	—	—	—		Non-album singles
"Voglia di vivere"	2023	87	—	—	—	—	—	—	—	FIMI: Gold	Voglia di vivere
"Mani vuote"	2023	—	—	—	—	—	—	—	—	FIMI: Gold	Voglia di vivere
"Ci pensiamo domani"	2023	7	—	—	—	—	—	—	—	FIMI: 4× Platinum	Voglia di vivere
"Che t'o dico a fa'"	2023	2	—	—	—	—	—	—	—	FIMI: 2× Platinum	Poké melodrama
"Fila indiana"	2023	37	—	—	—	—	—	—	—	FIMI: Gold	Poké melodrama
"La noia"	2024	4	57	94	11	63	54	11	110	FIMI: 3× Platinum; IFPI SWI: Gold	Poké melodrama
"Melodrama"	2024	16	—	—	—	—	—	—	—	FIMI: Platinum	Poké melodrama
"Per due come noi" (with Olly and Juli)	2024	1	—	—	—	—	—	—	—	FIMI: 3× Platinum	Tutta vita
"Velo sugli occhi"	2025	48	—	—	—	—	—	—	—		Caramé
"Canto d'amore" (featuring Marco Mengoni)	2026	8	—	—	—	—	—	—	—	FIMI: Gold	Caramé
"Vita da adulti"	2026	16	—	—	—	—	—	—	—		Caramé
"—" denotes a single that did not chart or was not released.

=== As featured artist ===
List of singles as featured artist, showing year released and album name
Title	Year	Peak chart positions	Album
Title	Year	ITA	Album
"Sentire" (Venerus featuring Angelina Mango)	2025	—	Speriamo
"Che bella vita" (Ariete featuring Angelina Mango)	2026	85	Tutti tornano a casa
"—" denotes a single that did not chart or was not released.

== Other charted songs ==
List of other charted songs, showing year released and album name
Title	Year	Peak chart positions	Album
Title	Year	ITA	Album
"Uguale a me" (featuring Marco Mengoni)	2024	50	Poké melodrama
"Ioeio" (featuring Madame)	2025	74	Caramé

== Guest appearances ==
List of non-single guest appearances, with other performing artists, showing year released, chart positions, certifications and album name
Title	Year	Other performer(s)	Peak chart positions	Album
Title	Year	Other performer(s)	ITA	Album
"Starlight" (The Supermen Lovers cover)	2011	Mango	—	La terra degli aquiloni
"Get Back" (The Beatles cover)	2014	Mango	—	L'amore è invisibile
"Piove forte"	2024	Stabber, Gemitaiz and Yung Snapp	—	Trueno
"Angelo custode"	2024	Tedua	19	La Divina Commedia (Deluxe)
"Senso di colpa"	2024	Dani Faiv	—	Ultimo piano B
"—" denotes a song that did not chart or was not released.

== Writing credits ==
List of songs written for other artists
Title	Year	Artist(s)	Album or EP
"Nuvola"	2023	Holden	Joseph
"Polo nord"	2025	Henna	Polo nord
"Dentro gli occhi di chiunque"	2025	Henna	Polo nord
"Meglio"	2025	Valentina Pesaresi	Non-album singles
"Dove iniziano tutti gli amori"	2026	Henna	Non-album singles
