= Voglia di vivere =

Voglia di vivere may refer to:

- Voglia di vivere (film), a 1990 Italian TV movie
- Voglia di vivere (EP), a 2023 EP by Angelina Mango
  - "Voglia di vivere" (song), a song from the EP
