= Caramé =

Studio album by Angelina Mango
- Released: 16 October 2025
- Recorded: 2025
- Genre: Pop
- Length: 46:07
- Label: Warner Music Italy
- Producers: Angelina Mango; Antonio Cirigliano; Dardust; E.D.D.; Filippo Mango; Mr. Monkey

Angelina Mango chronology
| Poké melodrama (2024) | Caramé (2025) |

Singles from Caramé
- 1. "Velo sugli occhi" Released: 17 October 2025; 2. "Canto d'amore" Released: 12 June 2026; 3. "Vita da adulti" Released: 16 October 2026

Caramé is the second studio album by Italian singer-songwriter Angelina Mango, released on 16 October 2025 by Warner Music Italy.

== Background and composition ==
Following her victory at the 74th Sanremo Music Festival with the song La noia and her participation in the 68th edition of the Eurovision Song Contest, in May 2024 Mango released her first studio album Poké melodrama. During the promotional tour of the recording project, the artist announced her cancellation after the third date to take a break from the music scene.

After a year-long recording hiatus, the singer-songwriter surprisingly released her second studio album, Caramé, on 16 October 2025. The album comprises sixteen tracks written by the singer-songwriter herself with the collaboration of writers and producers, including Dardust, Calcutta, Filippo Mango, Giovanni Pallotti, and Elena Mottarelli, who also performs the sixteenth track under the stage name Henna. The album features a single collaboration with Madame.

== Promotion ==
=== Album ===
Initially distributed only on digital and streaming platforms, from 5 December 2025 the album was also made available in a signed version on CD and vinyl.

=== Singles ===
On 17 October 2025, the tenth track "Velo sugli occhi" was made available as the first radio single from the album.

== Critics reception ==
The project was met with positive reviews from critics, who appreciated the songwriting and production of the tracks.

Alvise Salerno of All Music Italia describes the album as a "manifesto" of the artist's psychophysical state, stating that it is "everything that Poké melodrama should ideally have been: a debut album in which the artist tells his story in detail, without superstructures and with sincerity".

Mattia Marzi of Rockol notes the "genuineness and spontaneity" underlying the project, in which the singer-songwriter "lets herself go into intimate confessions about these past twelve months". Marzi states that the songs "partially escape the traditional song format" due to the "great expressive urgency", describing them in some cases as "drafts", in which the sounds range from pop to Latin American rhythms to power ballads.

Antonio Silvestri of Ondarock reports that Mango "has taken a step back from the infernal, non-stop hit-making machine", finding it "an intimate narrative", comparing it to projects by Elisa and Billie Eilish. Although he calls it a "confused" project, it "rekindles attention on a name that risked being obliterated by early success".

== Track listing ==
Caramé track listing
| No. | Title | Lyrics | Music | Producer(s) | Length |
|---|---|---|---|---|---|
| 1. | "Caramé" (intro) | Angelina Mango | Mango | Mango; E.D.D. | 1:40 |
| 2. | "7up" | Mango | Mango | Mango; E.D.D. | 2:33 |
| 3. | "Le scarpe slacciate" | Mango | Mango; Filippo Mango | Mango; E.D.D.; Filippo Mango | 2:06 |
| 4. | "Pacco fragile" | Mango | Mango; Antonio Cirigliano | Mango; Cirigliano; E.D.D. | 2:45 |
| 5. | "Ioeio" (featuring Madame) | Mango; Francesca Calearo | Mango; Calearo; Cirigliano; Matteo Novi | Mango; Cirigliano; E.D.D.; Mr. Monkey | 3:24 |
| 6. | "La vita va presa a morsi" | Mango | Mango; F. Mango | Mango; E.D.D.; F. Mango | 2:57 |
| 7. | "Come un bambino" | Mango | Mango | Mango; E.D.D. | 3:33 |
| 8. | "Mylove" | Mango | Mango; F. Mango | Mango; E.D.D.; F. Mango | 3:38 |
| 9. | "Nina canta" (intermezzo) | Mango | Mango | Mango; E.D.D.; F. Mango | 1:38 |
| 10. | "Velo sugli occhi" | Mango | Mango | Mango; E.D.D. | 2:37 |
| 11. | "Ci siamo persi la fine" | Mango | Mango; Cirigliano | Mango; E.D.D.; F. Mango | 3:32 |
| 12. | "Tutto all'aria" | Mango | Mango; F. Mango | Mango; E.D.D.; F. Mango | 3:00 |
| 13. | "Bomba a mano" | Mango | Mango | Mango; E.D.D. | 3:47 |
| 14. | "Aiaiai" | Mango; Edoardo D'Erme | Dario Faini | Mango; Dardust | 3:29 |
| 15. | "Igloo" | Mango; Elena Mottarelli | Mango; Mottarelli | Mango; E.D.D.; F. Mango | 2:49 |
| 16. | "Cosicosicosicosì" (performed by Henna) | Mottatelli; F. Mango | Mottarelli; F. Mango | Mango; E.D.D.; F. Mango | 2:49 |

Caramé – 2026 digital reissue bonus tracks
| No. | Title | Lyrics | Music | Producer(s) | Length |
|---|---|---|---|---|---|
| 1. | "Vita da adulti" | Mango | Michele Zocca | Michelangelo | 3:33 |
| 2. | "Canto d'amore" (with Marco Mengoni) | Mango, Mengoni, Jacopo Angelo Ettorre | Ettorre, Nicola Lazzarin | Cripo, E.D.D. | 3:14 |
| 19. | "Melodrama" (Caramé Live Version) | | | | 3:32 |
| 20. | "Smile" (Caramé Live Version) | | | | 2:24 |
| 21. | "Che t'o dico a fa'" (Caramé Live Version) | | | | 2:56 |
| 22. | "La noia" (Caramé Live Version) | | | | 2:24 |
| Total length: | | | | | 64:10 |

Notes

- Note 1: All titles are stylized in lowercase;
- Note 2: The sixteenth track is performed entirely by Henna.

== Charts ==
Chart performance for Caramé
| Chart (2025) | Peak position |
|---|---|
| Italian Albums (FIMI) | 4 |
