= Fulminacci =

Italian singer-songwriter (born 1997)

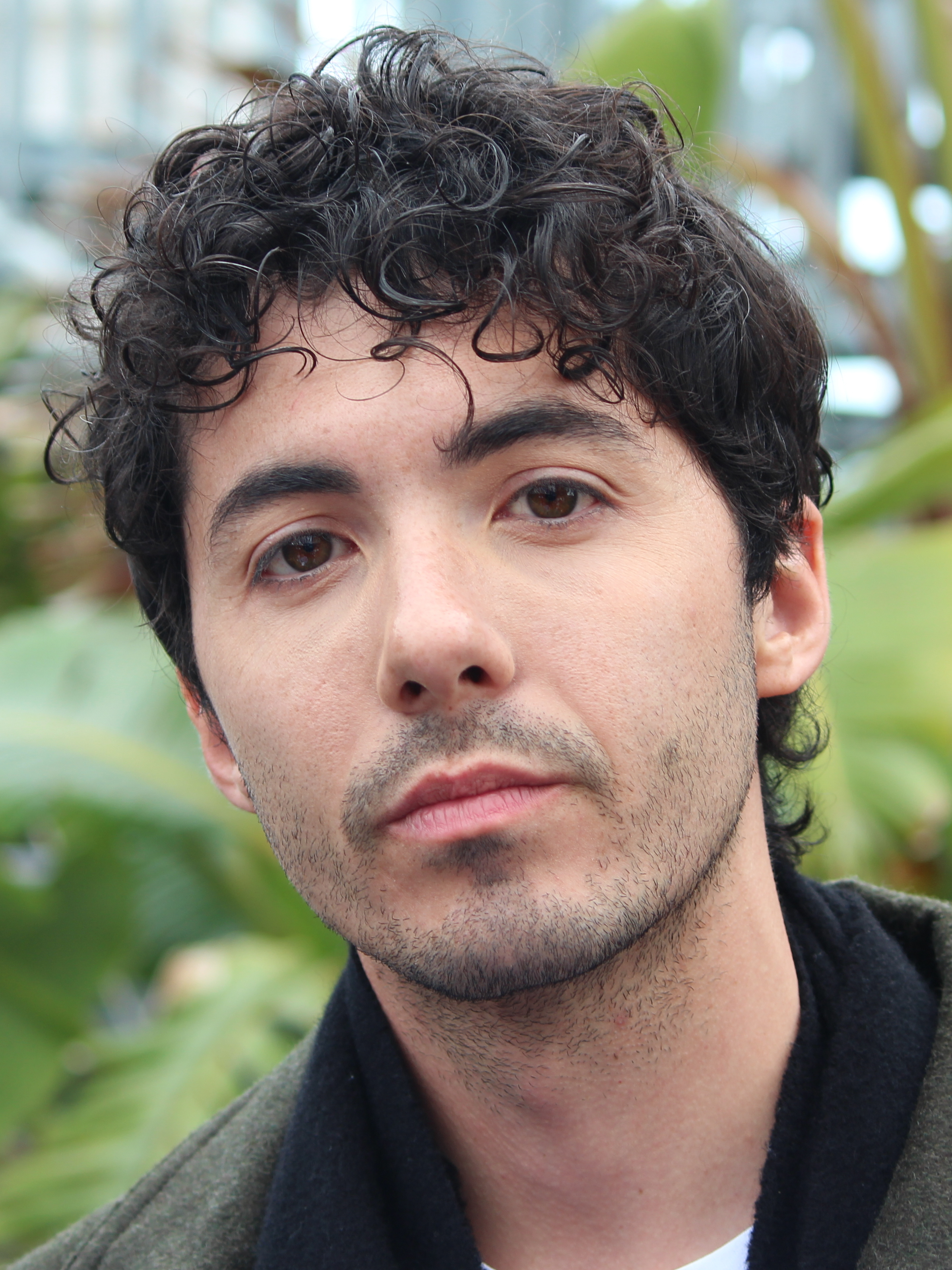
- Fulminacci at the Sanremo Music Festival 2026

Background information
- Born: Filippo Uttinacci; 12 September 1997 (age 28); Rome, Lazio, Italy
- Genres: Indie pop
- Occupations: Singer; songwriter
- Instruments: Vocals; guitar; drums
- Years active: 2019–present
- Label: Maciste Dischi

Filippo Uttinacci (born 12 September 1997), known professionally as Fulminacci (Italian pronunciation: [fulmiˈnattʃi]), is an Italian singer-songwriter.

In April 2019, he debuted with the studio album La vita veramente, which was awarded the Targa Tenco for Best Debut Album. He also won the prize for Artist of the Year at the Rockol Awards 2019. After performing in several Italian music festivals, he enlarged his popularity in 2021, competing for the first time in the Sanremo Music Festival with the song "Santa Marinella". His second studio album was released shortly after, and became his first top-5 entry on the FIMI Italian Albums Chart.

== Biography ==
=== Early life ===
Filippo Uttinacci was born in Rome on 12 September 1997 and grew up in the Casal Lumbroso district. His father is a graphic designer, while his mother co-owns a furniture store, together with his aunt. He has a brother. He attended primary school and middle school at a Catholic institute run by nuns. He later studied at the liceo classico "Dante Alighieri" in the rione Prati in Rome. At the age of 10, Fulminacci entered a music school and started to play guitar. Two years later, he also began studying drums. He wrote his first songs at the age 16. He was initially reluctant at singing, but he decided to reveal himself recording the songs he wrote. Encouraged by the positive reaction received by his family, he sent his demos to independent label Maciste Dischi and signed his first recording deal. In 2018, he debuted as an actor, starring in the short film Fammi parlare by Luca Iacoella. He also appeared in the music video of the song "In My Mind", recorded for Italian TV series Immaturi.

=== Music career ===
His debut single, "Borghese in borghese", was released in January 2019 by Maciste Dischi. He initially decided not to reveal his real name and surname. For that reason, he decided to adopt the stage name "Fulminacci", chosen after brainstorming for something "unexpected and very personal". His pseudonym has an assonance with his surname, and is typically used as an exclamation of angered surprise in comics.

His second single, "La vita veramente", was released in February 2019, and followed by "Una sera", which was one of the first songs he wrote. His debut studio album, also titled La vita veramente and featuring all of his previous singles, was released by Maciste Dischi and distributed by Artist First on 9 April 2019. The album was produced by Federico Nardelli and Giordano Colombo. Shortly after the album's release, Fulminacci took part in the 2019 International Workers' Day concert in Piazza San Giovanni Laterano, Rome, annually supported by Italian trade unions CGIL, CISL and UIL. He performed at several Italian music festivals, including the Mi Ami Festival in Milan, the Mind Festival in Montecosaro, the Goa-Boa Festival in Genoa and the Flowers Festival in Turin. During the summer of 2019, Fulminacci released the music videos for the songs "Resistenza" and "Tommaso", both featured in his debut album. In July 2019, La vita veramente received the Targa Tenco for Best Debut Album. In December of the same year, he was named Artist of the Year at the Rockol Awards 2019. On 6 December 2019, he also released the vinyl version of his debut album, featuring the singles "Le ruote, i motori" and "San Giovanni".

On 1 May 2020, he performed for the second time at the International Workers' Day concert. As a consequence of the COVID-19 pandemic, the event was adapted to a televised show without any audience, and Fulminacci performed "San Giovanni" from the Audtiorium Parco della Musica in Rome. On 9 September 2020, Fulminacci released the new single "Canguro", followed by "Un fatto tuo personale" in December of the same year. Both songs were included in Fulminacci's second studio album, Tante care cose, which was released on 12 March 2021, shortly after his appearance at the 71st Sanremo Music Festival. Fulminacci competed in the Big Artists section with the song "Santa Marinella", also released as a single from Tante care cose, and placed 16th in a field of 26. Tante care cose was re-released in 2022 with three additional tracks, including the single "Chitarre blu" and the song "Aglio e olio", featuring vocals by Willie Peyote. Fulminacci embarked on a tour in May 2022, originally scheduled for March of the same year and preceded by a few shows held during the summer of 2021.

In 2023, Fulminacci released the new singles "Tutto inutile" and "Ragù", and announced he was working on a new studio album. He also appeared as a guest on several albums, including Gazzelle's Dentro and Daniele Silvestri's Disco X. As a songwriter, Uttinacci co-authored the top ten single "Ci pensiamo domani", recorded by Angelina Mango. His third studio album, Infinito +1, was released on 23 November 2023.

On 30 November 2025, he was announced among the participants of the Sanremo Music Festival 2026. He competed with the song "Stupida sfortuna", which was included in his fourth studio album, Calcinacci, released on 13 March 2026. The song eventually placed 7th in the final among a field of 30 competing songs and won the Mia Martini Critics' Award.

== Personal life ==
In 2017, Fulminacci started a relationship with actress Lia Grieco. Grieco and Uttinacci appeared together in the music video for "In My Mind". She also appeared in the video for Fulminacci's single "Tommaso". In June 2025, during an interview released to la Repubblica, Fulminacci revealed he was "not in love" at the moment. Although the couple never released any official announcement, their break-up was later confirmed.

He is a supporter of A.S. Roma.

== Discography ==
=== Studio albums ===
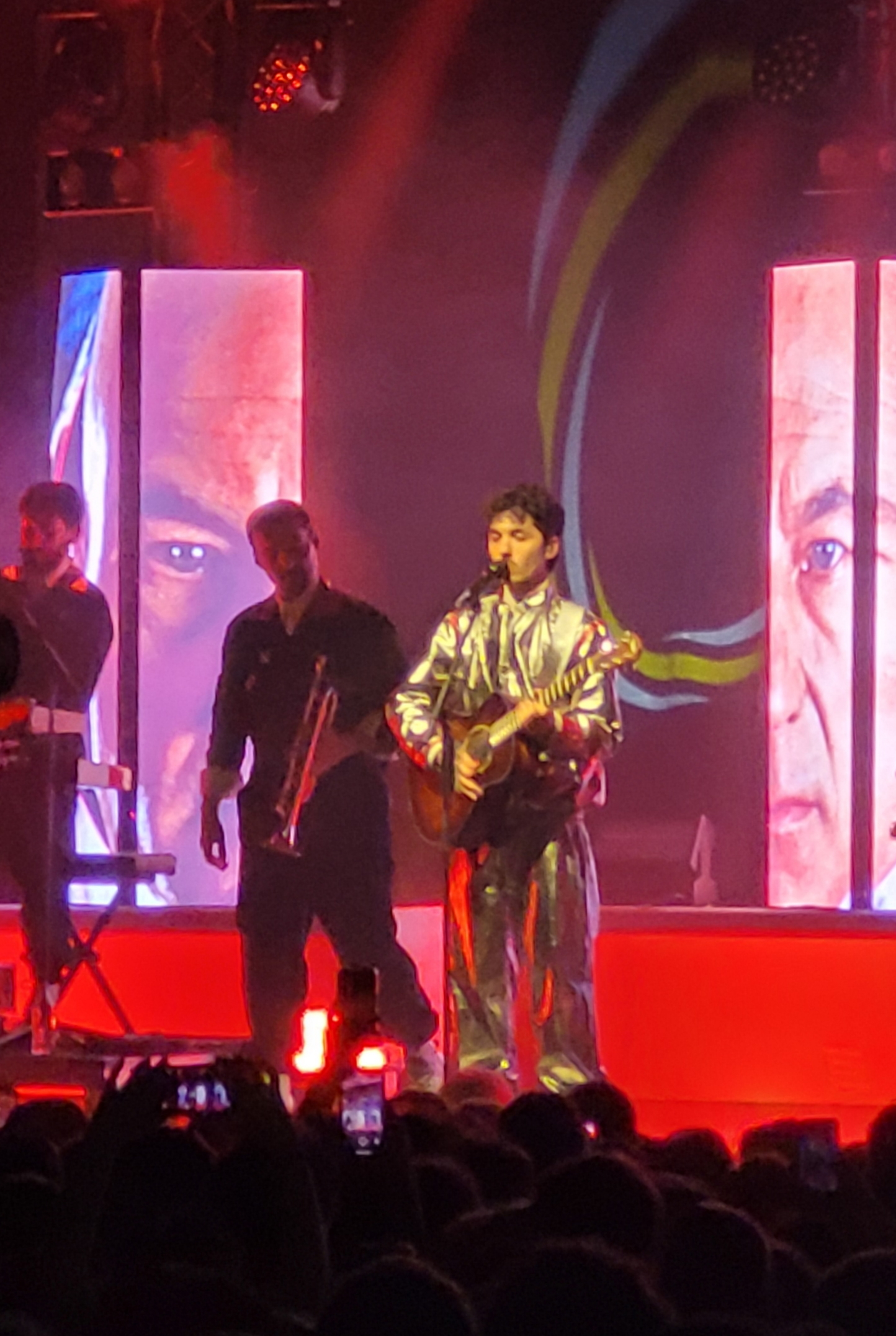
Fulminacci performing in Milan, during his Infinito +1 Tour in 2024

List of albums, with chart positions and certifications
Title	Album details	Peak chart positions	Certifications
Title	Album details	ITA	Certifications
La vita veramente	Released: 9 April 2019; Label: Maciste Dischi; Format: Digital download, CD, LP	77	FIMI: Gold
Tante care cose (re-issued as Tante care cose e altri successi in 2022)	Released: 12 March 2021; Label: Maciste Dischi; Format: Digital download, CD, LP	5	FIMI: Platinum
Infinito +1	Released: 24 November 2023; Label: Maciste Dischi; Format: Digital download, CD, LP	9	FIMI: Gold
Calcinacci	Released: 13 March 2025; Label: Maciste Dischi; Format: Digital download, CD, LP	2	FIMI: Gold

=== Singles ===
==== As lead artist ====
List of singles, with chart positions, album name and certifications
Single	Year	Peak chart positions	Certifications	Album
Single	Year	ITA	Certifications	Album
"Borghese in borghese"	2019	—		La vita veramente
"La vita veramente"	2019	—		La vita veramente
"Una sera"	2019	—		La vita veramente
"Le ruote, i motori!"	2019	—		La vita veramente (LP)
"San Giovanni"	2019	—	FIMI: Gold	La vita veramente (LP)
"Canguro"	2020	—		Tante care cose
"Un fatto tuo personale"	2020	—		Tante care cose
"Santa Marinella"	2021	19	FIMI: Gold	Tante care cose
"Tattica"	2021	—		Tante care cose
"Miss Mondo Africa"	2021	—		Tante care cose
"Brutte compagnie"	2021	—		Tante care cose e altri successi
"Chitarre blu"	2022	—		Tante care cose e altri successi
"Tutto inutile"	2023	—		Infinito +1
"Ragù"	2023	—		Infinito +1
"Filippo Leroy"	2023	—		Infinito +1
"Baciami baciami"	2023	—		Infinito +1
"+1"	2024	—		Infinito +1
"Casomai"	2025	—		Calcinacci
"Niente di particolare"	2025	—		Calcinacci
"Stupida sfortuna"	2026	5	FIMI: Platinum	Calcinacci
"Maledetto me"	2026	54		Calcinacci
"—" denotes an item that did not chart in that country.

==== Featured singles ====
List of singles, with chart positions, album name and certifications
Single	Year	Peak chart positions	Certifications	Album
Single	Year	ITA	Certifications	Album
"Fino a quando il cielo esiste" (Mox featuring Fulminacci)	2020	—		L'aria Il cielo Il coperto Il sereno
"Stavo pensando a te" (Mobrici featuring Fulminacci)	2022	—	FIMI: Gold	Gli anni di Cristo
"Magari" (Marco Castello featuring Fulminacci)	2022	—		Non-album single
"Intro X" (Daniele Silvestri featuring Emanuela Fanelli, Frankie Hi-NRG MC, Fulminacci, Wrongonyou, Franco126, Selton, Eva, Davide Shorty and Giorgia)	2023	—		Disco X
"L'uomo nello specchio" (Daniele Silvestri featuring Fulminacci)	2023	—		Disco X

=== Other charted and certified songs ===
List of charted or certified non-single tracks
Title	Year	Peak chart positions	Certifications	Album
Title	Year	ITA	Certifications	Album
"Tommaso"	2019	—	FIMI: Platinum	La vita veramente
"Aglio e olio" (featuring Willie Peyote)	2022	—	FIMI: Platinum	Tante care cose e altri successi
"Milioni" (Gazzelle featuring Fulminacci)	2023	72	FIMI: Gold	Dentro
"Puoi" (with Pinguini Tattici Nucleari)	2023	56	FIMI: Gold	Infinito +1
"Passatempo" (Juli featuring Fulminacci)	2026	81		Solito cinema

=== Other album appearances ===
List of non-single album appearances
Title	Year	Album
"Felicità" (Samuel featuring Fulminacci)	2021	Brigata bianca
"Cancella file" (Vipra featuring Fulminacci)	2021	Simpatico, solare, in cerca di amicizie
"Ricomincio da tre" (Giuse the Lizia featuring Fulminacci)	2023	Crush
"Il mondo con gli occhi" (Dente featuring Fulminacci, Giorgio Poi, Colapesce, VV, Ditonellapiaga and Dimartino)	2023	Hotel Souvenir
"Mai più" (Mace with Fabri Fibra, Fulminacci and Vins)	2024	Maya
"Due estranei" (Franco126 featuring Fulminacci)	2025	Futuri possibili
"Sono pazzo" (Mobrici featuring Fulminacci)	2026	Supernova
"Passatempo" (Juli featuring Fulminacci)	2026	Solito cinema

=== Writing credits ===
List of songs written for other artists
Title	Year	Artist	Album	Co-writers
"Sopra le canzoni"	2021	Rkomi with Dardust	Taxi Driver	Rkomi, Dario Faini
"Non ti perdo mai"	2022	Ditonellapiaga	Camouflage	Alessandro Casagni, Benjamin Ventura, Margherita Carducci
"Chi se lo ricorda"	2022	Faiah	Nemmeno per sogno	William Dotto, Faiah El Degwy, Iacopo Sinigaglia
"Bolero"	2022	Baby K & Mika	Donna sulla Luna	Claudia Nahum, Michael Holbrook Penniman Jr., Jacopo Ettorre, Dario Faini
"Ghetto perfetto"	2023	Francesca Michielin	Cani sciolti	Francesca Michielin
"Lato A lato B"	2023	Giuse the Lizia	Crush	Giuseppe Puleo, Iacopo Sinigaglia
"Ci pensiamo domani"	2023	Angelina Mango	Voglia di vivere	Angelina Mango, Alessandro La Cava, Stefano Tognini
"Nessuno sa stare al mondo"	2026	Matteo Alieno	Stare al mondo	Matteo Alieno

== Awards and nominations ==
Year	Award	Nomination	Work	Result
2019	Targa Tenco	Best Debut Album	La vita veramente	Won
2019	Rockol Awards	Artist of the Year	Himself	Won
2021	Amnesty Award	Voices for Freedom	"Un fatto tuo personale"	Nominated
