= La vita veramente =

Studio album by Fulminacci
- Released: 9 April 2019
- Length: 29:06
- Label: Maciste Dischi
- Producer: Federico Nardelli, Giordano Colombo

Fulminacci chronology
La vita veramente (2019)	Tante care cose (2021)

Singles from La vita veramente
- 1. "Borghese in borghese" Released: 9 January 2019; 2. "La vita veramente" Released: 15 February 2019; 3. "Una sera" Released: 1 April 2019

Singles from La vita veramente LP
- 1. "Le ruote, i motori!" Released: 8 November 2019; 2. "San Giovanni" Released: 6 December 2019

La vita veramente (lit. 'Life really') is the debut studio album by Italian singer-songwriter Fulminacci.

The album was released on 9 April 2019 and includes the singles "Borghese in borghese", "La vita veramente" and "Una sera". On 6 December 2019, a vinyl version of the album was released, featuring the singles "Le ruote, i motori!" and "San Giovanni".

La vita veramente was awarded with the Targa Tenco for Best 2019 Debut Album.

== Track listing ==
Digital download, CD
No.	Title	Length
1.	"Davanti a te"	3:14
2.	"La vita veramente"	3:21
3.	"Tommaso"	2:37
4.	"Borghese in borghese"	3:12
5.	"Resistenza"	3:47
6.	"I nostri corpi"	3:08
7.	"Al giusto momento"	3:36
8.	"La soglia dell'attenzione"	3:16
9.	"Una sera"	2:55
Total length:		29:06

Vinyl LP
No.	Title	Length
1.	"Davanti a te"	3:14
2.	"La vita veramente"	3:21
3.	"Tommaso"	2:37
4.	"Borghese in borghese"	3:12
5.	"Resistenza"	3:47
6.	"I nostri corpi"	3:08
7.	"Al giusto momento"	3:36
8.	"La soglia dell'attenzione"	3:16
9.	"Una sera"	2:55
10.	"Le ruote, i motori!"	3:45
11.	"San Giovanni"	2:54
Total length:		35:45

== Charts ==
Chart performance for La vita veramente
Chart (2021)	Peak position
Italian Albums (FIMI)	77

== Awards and nominations ==
Year	Award	Nomination	Work	Result
2019	Targa Tenco	Best Debut Album	La vita veramente	Won
