= Infinito +1 =

Studio album by Fulminacci
- Released: 24 November 2023
- Genre: Indie pop
- Label: Maciste Dischi
- Producer: okgiorgio

Fulminacci chronology
Tante care cose (2021)	Infinito +1 (2023)	Calcinacci (2026)

Singles from Infinito +1
- 1. "Tutto inutile" Released: 11 January 2023; 2. "Simile" Released: 23 May 2023; 3. "Ragù" Released: 26 May 2023; 4. "Filippo Leroy" Released: 15 September 2023; 5. "Baciami baciami" Released: 24 November 2023; 6. "+1" Released: 12 January 2024

Infinito +1 is the third studio album by Italian singer-songwriter Fulminacci. It was released on 24 November 2023 through Maciste Dischi.

== Track listing ==
Infinito +1 – Standard track listing
No.	Title	Lyrics	Music	Length
1.	"Spacca"	Filippo Uttinacci	Uttinacci; Pierfrancesco Pasini; Federico Laini; Nicola Regonesi; Giorgio Pesenti	2:42
2.	"Puoi" (featuring Pinguini Tattici Nucleari)	Uttinacci; Riccardo Zanotti	Uttinacci; Zanotti; Pesenti	2:47
3.	"Ragù"	Uttinacci	Uttinacci	2:58
4.	"Filippo Leroy"	Uttinacci	Uttinacci; Pesenti	3:03
5.	"Simile"	Uttinacci	Uttinacci	3:33
6.	"Occhi grigi" (featuring Giovanni Truppi)	Uttinacci; Giovanni Truppi	Uttinacci; Truppi	3:53
7.	"Baciami baciami"	Uttinacci	Uttinacci; Pesenti	3:42
8.	"Tutto inutile"	Uttinacci	Uttinacci; Pesenti	2:51
9.	"Così cosà"	Uttinacci	Uttinacci	2:44
10.	"La siepe"	Uttinacci	Uttinacci	3:46

Infinito +1 – Digital re-issue bonus track
No.	Title	Lyrics	Music	Length
1.	"+1"	Uttinacci	Uttinacci; Pesenti	3:06

== Charts ==
Chart performance for Infinito +1
Chart (2024)	Peak position
Italian Albums (FIMI)	9

== Certifications ==
Certifications for Infinito +1
Region	Certification	Certified units/sales
Italy (FIMI)	Gold	25,000^{‡}
^{‡} Sales+streaming figures based on certification alone.
