= Italy in the Eurovision Song Contest 2024 =

- Eurovision Song Contest 2024
- Participating broadcaster: Radiotelevisione italiana (RAI)
- Country: Italy
- Selection process: Sanremo Music Festival 2024
- Selection date: 10 February 2024

Competing entry
- Song: "La noia"
- Artist: Angelina Mango
- Songwriters: Angelina Mango; Dario Faini; Francesca Calearo

Placement
- Final result: 7th, 268 points

Participation chronology

Italy was represented at the Eurovision Song Contest 2024 with the song "La noia", written by Angelina Mango, Dario Faini, and Francesca Calearo, and performed by Angelina Mango herself. The Italian participating broadcaster, Radiotelevisione italiana (RAI), selected its entry through the Sanremo Music Festival 2024.

As a member of the "Big Five", Italy automatically qualified to compete in the final of the Eurovision Song Contest.

== Background ==
Prior to the 2024 contest, Radiotelevisione italiana (RAI) had participated in the Eurovision Song Contest representing Italy forty-seven times since its first entry at the inaugural contest in 1956. Since then, it has won the contest on three occasions: in 1964 with the song "Non ho l'età" performed by Gigliola Cinquetti, in 1990 with "Insieme: 1992" by Toto Cutugno, and in 2021 with "Zitti e buoni" by Måneskin. It has withdrawn from the contest a number of times, with their most recent absence spanning from 1998 until 2010. It made its return in 2011, and its entry "Madness of Love", performed by Raphael Gualazzi, placed second—its highest result, to that point, since its victory in 1990. A number of top 10 placements followed in subsequent editions, including its third victory in 2021. In 2023, it placed fourth with "Due vite" performed by Marco Mengoni.

As part of its duties as participating broadcaster, RAI organises the selection of its entry in the Eurovision Song Contest and broadcasts the event in the country. Between 2011 and 2013 and since 2015, RAI has regularly used the Sanremo Music Festival to select its entrant to the contest, at first through an intermediate stage of internal selection among the contestants, and after 2014 (when a full internal selection took place), the winner of the festival has always earned the right of first refusal to represent Italy in the Eurovision Song Contest.

== Before Eurovision ==
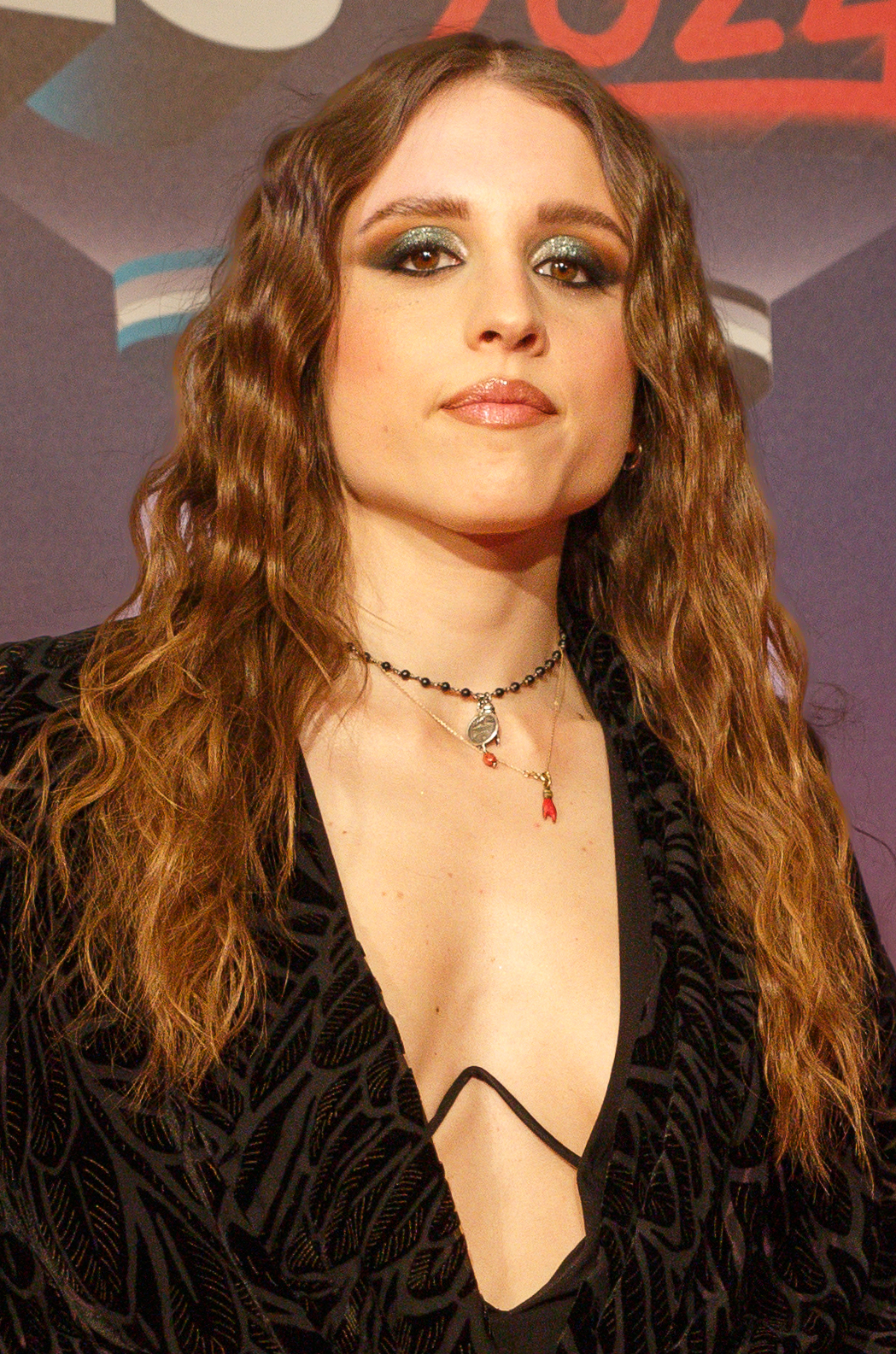
Angelina Mango, winner of the Sanremo Music Festival 2024, at the PrePartyES event in Madrid

=== Sanremo Music Festival 2024 ===
Italian broadcaster RAI organised the Sanremo Music Festival 2024, the 74th edition of the event, between 6 and 10 February 2024. On 10 July 2023, the broadcaster published the rules of the competition, confirming that its winner would earn the right to represent the country at the Eurovision Song Contest.

30 artists competed in the festival over the course of five consecutive nights; three contestants directly qualified from the selection Sanremo Giovani on 19 December 2023, while the other 27 were selected by the artistic director Amadeus by direct invitation and from submissions received by the deadline of 27 November 2023. Those 27 competing artists were announced on 3 December 2023. The titles of the competing entries were revealed during Sanremo Giovani. Four former Eurovision Song Contest entrants were among the competing artists: Ricchi e Poveri (1978), Emma (2014), Il Volo (2015), and Mahmood (2019 and 2022), in addition to Diodato, who was set to represent Italy in 2020 before the contest's cancellation.

==== Final ====
The final of the festival took place on 10 February 2024. All of the artists performed their songs one final time, with a public televoting being summed up to the results obtained in the previous nights to determine five qualifiers for the superfinal round. The score was then reset and a combination of public televoting (34%), radio jury voting (33%) and press jury voting (33%) selected the winner, Angelina Mango with the song "La noia". The following morning, Mango confirmed her participation in the contest.

Superfinal – 10 February 2024
R/O	Artist	Song	Press jury rank	Radio jury rank	Televote score	Total score	Place
1	Irama	"Tu no"	5	4	7.5%	6.9%	5
2	Ghali	"Casa mia"	3	3	8.3%	10.5%	4
3	Angelina Mango	"La noia"	1	1	16.1%	40.3%	1
4	Geolier	"I p' me, tu p' te"	4	5	60.0%	25.2%	2
5	Annalisa	"Sinceramente"	2	2	8.0%	17.1%	3

=== Preparations and promotion ===
Discussing her participation in Eurovision shortly after her Sanremo victory, Mango commented that she and the songwriting team were considering the possibility to change part of the lyrics to English or Spanish ahead of the contest. On 6 March 2024, RAI released an official statement of participation, confirming that the song had been reworked to comply with Eurovision regulations requiring that entries do not exceed a length of 3 minutes, and shortly after Mango confirmed that the lyrics would remain in Italian.

As part of the promotion of her participation in the contest, Mango attended the PrePartyES in Madrid on 30 March 2024, the Barcelona Eurovision Party on 6 April 2024, the London Eurovision Party on 7 April 2024 and the Eurovision in Concert event in Amsterdam on 13 April 2024. On 20 April 2024, she made an appearance on the Croatian TV show Zvijezde pjevaju, broadcast on HRT 1. In addition, she performed at the Eurovision Village in Malmö on 7 May 2024.

== At Eurovision ==
The Eurovision Song Contest 2024 is taking place at the Malmö Arena in Malmö, Sweden, and consists of two semi-finals held on the respective dates of 7 and 9 May and the final on 11 May 2024. All nations with the exceptions of the host country and the "Big Five" (France, Germany, Italy, Spain and the United Kingdom) are required to qualify from one of two semi-finals in order to compete in the final; the top ten countries from each semi-final progress to the final. As a member of the "Big Five", Italy automatically qualifies to compete in the final on 11 May 2024, but is also required to broadcast and vote in one of the two semi-finals. This was decided via a draw held during the semi-final allocation draw on 30 January 2024, when it was announced that Italy would be voting in the second semi-final. The draw, broadcast live on the official Eurovision Song Contest YouTube channel, was also aired by RAI via its streaming platform RaiPlay. Despite being an automatic qualifier for the final, the Italian entry was also performed during the semi-final. On 4 May 2024, a draw was held to determine which half of the final each "Big Five" country would perform in; Italy drew "producer's choice", meaning that the country will perform in the half decided by the contest's producers.

In May 2023, Claudio Fasulo, deputy head of primetime entertainment at RAI (as well as member of the EBU's Eurovision reference group), discussed the possibility of expanding Eurovision-related programming on Rai 1, including moving the broadcast of the semi-finals from Rai 2 to Rai 1. However, the broadcaster ultimately confirmed that the semi-finals would air on Rai 2 and the final on Rai 1; all three shows are also being broadcast on Rai Radio 2 and are available on RaiPlay. The television broadcasts is accompanied with commentary by Gabriele Corsi and Mara Maionchi, while Diletta Parlangeli and Matteo Osso commentate the radio broadcast.

=== Footage leaks ===
Footage from Italy's stand-in rehearsal, which preceded Angelina Mango's first rehearsal, was leaked online. During its press conference of the presentation of the contest, RAI asked people not to further share the content, as it was only meant for internal usage among members of the delegation, and said it had alerted the EBU about potential cybersecurity issues.

=== Performance ===
Angelina Mango took part in technical rehearsals on 2 and 4 May, followed by dress rehearsals on 10 and 11 May. Her performance of "La noia" at the contest is choreographed by Mecnun Giasar and will include five supporting dancers as well as a throne elevating from the ground. The graphics of the staging and costumes, which include a corset or bodysuit for Mango, are based on a pattern of intertwined twigs and flowers, meant to evoke a "psychedelic forest". The performance ends with cascading pyrotechnics in the background.

=== Final ===
On 4 May 2024, a draw was held to determine which half of the final each "Big Five" country would perform in; Italy drew "producer's choice", meaning that the country would perform in the half decided by the contest's producers. Italy performed in position 15, following the entry from Norway and before the entry from Serbia.

=== Voting ===
Below is a breakdown of points awarded to and by Italy in the second semi-final and in the final. Voting during the three shows involved each country awarding sets of points from 1-8, 10 and 12: one from their professional jury and the other from televoting in the final vote, while the semi-final vote was based entirely on the vote of the public. The Italian jury consisted of BigMama, Elena Di Cioccio, Maurizio Filardo, Barbara Mosconi, and Marcello Sacchetta. In the final, Italy placed 7th with 268 points. Over the course of the contest, Italy awarded its 12 points to Israel in the second semi-final and in the televote at the final, and to Switzerland in the jury vote at the final.

RAI appointed Mario Acampa, who co-hosted the allocation draw and the opening "Turquoise Carpet" of the 2022 contest, as its spokesperson to announce the Italian jury's votes in the final.

==== Points awarded to Italy ====
Points awarded to Italy (Final)
Score	Televote	Jury
12 points		
10 points		Albania; Austria; Moldova; San Marino
8 points	Albania; Malta; Switzerland	Armenia; Greece; Malta
7 points	Croatia; Israel	Australia; Belgium; Georgia; Poland; Sweden
6 points	Armenia	Azerbaijan; Croatia; Israel; Netherlands; Serbia; Switzerland
5 points		Norway; Portugal; United Kingdom
4 points	France; Greece; Moldova; Poland; Portugal; Serbia; Spain	
3 points	Azerbaijan; Belgium; Cyprus; Georgia; Germany; Luxembourg; San Marino; Slovenia	Cyprus; Estonia; Slovenia
2 points	Lithuania; Netherlands	Germany; Ukraine
1 point	Austria; Ireland; Rest of the World; Sweden	Spain

==== Points awarded by Italy ====
Points awarded by Italy (Semi-final 2)
Score	Televote
12 points	Israel
10 points	Netherlands
8 points	Switzerland
7 points	Armenia
6 points	Greece
5 points	Georgia
4 points	Albania
3 points	Estonia
2 points	Czechia
1 point	San Marino

Points awarded by Italy (Final)
Score	Televote	Jury
12 points	Israel	Switzerland
10 points	Ukraine	Ireland
8 points	Croatia	Croatia
7 points	Switzerland	Spain
6 points	France	Sweden
5 points	Georgia	Austria
4 points	Armenia	Germany
3 points	Ireland	Armenia
2 points	Greece	Estonia
1 point	Spain	France

==== Detailed voting results ====
Each participating broadcaster assembles a five-member jury panel consisting of music industry professionals who are citizens of the country they represent. Each jury, and individual jury member, is required to meet a strict set of criteria regarding professional background, as well as diversity in gender and age. No member of a national jury was permitted to be related in any way to any of the competing acts in such a way that they cannot vote impartially and independently. The individual rankings of each jury member as well as the nation's televoting results were released shortly after the grand final.

On 9 May, at the end of the broadcast of the second semi-final, Italian broadcaster RAI displayed the televoting percentages for all countries in the semi-final on screen. On 10 May, RAI released a statement confirming that this was a technical glitch, and that the percentages displayed were incomplete and from only a partial result of the televote. RAI subsequently released the accurate televoting percentages for both the second semi-final and the final following the final.

The following members comprised the Italian jury:

- Elena Maria Di Cioccio
- Maurizio Filardo
- Marianna Mammone (BigMama)
- Barbara Mosconi
- Marcello Sacchetta

Detailed voting results from Italy (Semi-final 2)
R/O	Country	Televote		
R/O	Country	Percentage	Rank	Points
01	Malta	2.18%	15	
02	Albania	4.84%	7	4
03	Greece	5.76%	5	6
04	Switzerland	6.23%	3	8
05	Czechia	3.18%	9	2
06	Austria	3.14%	11	
07	Denmark	2.67%	14	
08	Armenia	6.22%	4	7
09	Latvia	2.97%	12	
10	San Marino	3.17%	10	1
11	Georgia	5.44%	6	5
12	Belgium	1.71%	16	
13	Estonia	4.13%	8	3
14	Israel	36.01%	1	12
15	Norway	2.78%	13	
16	Netherlands	9.58%	2	10

Detailed voting results from Italy (Final)
R/O	Country	Jury							Televote		
R/O	Country	Juror A	Juror B	Juror C	Juror D	Juror E	Rank	Points	Percentage	Rank	Points
01	Sweden	5	12	5	2	9	6	6	1.09%	21	
02	Ukraine	18	13	15	5	15	12		21.12%	2	10
03	Germany	12	4	14	4	20	8	4	1.50%	14	
04	Luxembourg	14	16	16	17	16	20		1.24%	19	
~~05~~	~~Netherlands~~ ‡ (Note: The Netherlands was disqualified prior to the final.)	~~11~~	~~3~~	~~3~~	~~8~~	~~2~~	~~2~~		N/A	N/A	
06	Israel	23	25	25	11	25	22		26.02%	1	12
07	Lithuania	22	20	17	16	22	24		1.79%	13	
08	Spain	7	6	2	3	10	5	7	2.61%	10	1
09	Estonia	9	11	6	22	5	10	2	1.82%	12	
10	Ireland	2	7	4	13	3	3	10	3.07%	8	3
11	Latvia	13	19	13	14	23	19		1.25%	18	
12	Greece	8	9	24	15	13	14		2.87%	9	2
13	United Kingdom	15	17	22	10	21	18		0.74%	23	
14	Norway	25	18	7	24	24	16		1.21%	20	
15	Italy										
16	Serbia	24	22	18	23	8	17		1.37%	17	
17	Finland	16	14	23	20	14	21		2.04%	11	
18	Portugal	19	15	19	9	17	15		0.65%	24	
19	Armenia	6	5	8	21	11	9	3	3.23%	7	4
20	Cyprus	17	21	21	18	18	23		1.39%	16	
21	Switzerland	1	1	1	1	1	1	12	5.50%	4	7
22	Slovenia	21	24	20	25	19	25		0.77%	22	
23	Croatia	4	2	12	6	4	4	8	9.73%	3	8
24	Georgia	20	23	9	7	12	13		3.32%	6	5
25	France	10	10	11	12	7	11	1	4.21%	5	6
26	Austria	3	8	10	19	6	7	5	1.48%	15	
