= Marco Castello =

Italian singer-songwriter (born 1993)

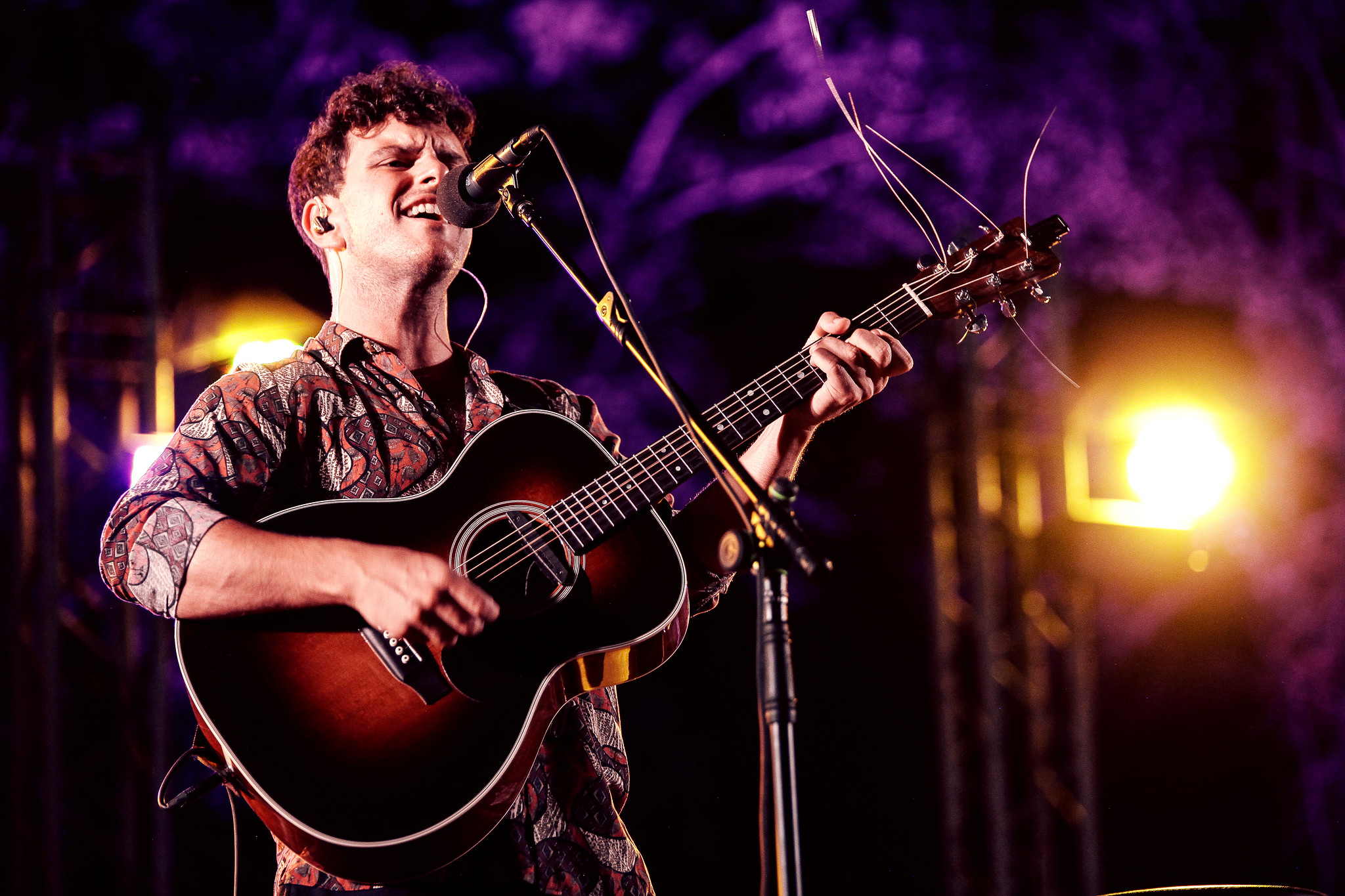
- Castello in 2022

Background information
- Born: 8 September 1993 (age 32); Syracuse, Sicily, Italy
- Occupation: Singer-songwriter

Marco Castello (born 8 September 1993) is an Italian singer-songwriter, composer, record producer and multi-instrumentalist.

== Life and career ==
Born in Syracuse, after high school, Castello studied jazz trumpet at the Civica Scuola di Musica in Milan. In 2016, he started touring and recording with Erlend Øye as a member of his supporting band La Comitiva.

After some singles, in 2021, Castello released his first solo album Contenta tu, recorded at the Butterama Studio in Berlin and produced by The Whitest Boy Alive members Marcin Öz and Daniel Nentwig. In 2022, he released "Magari", a single in collaboration with Fulminacci, which Rolling Stone Italia ranked third in its list of the 10 best Italian songs of the year.

In 2023, Castello founded the record label Megghiu Suli, with whom he produced his second album, Pezzi della sera. In 2024, he recorded with Calibro 35 a cover version of Lucio Dalla's song "Lunedì Cinema", which served as the lead single of the band's EP Jazzploitation and was later included in their album Exploration. In December 2025, he released his third album, Quaglia sovversiva.

== Discography ==
=== Album ===
- 2021 – Contenta tu
- 2023 – Pezzi della sera
- 2025 – Quaglia sovversiva
