= Santa Marinella (song) =

Single by Fulminacci

from the album Tante care cose
- Released: 4 March 2021
- Length: 3:41
- Label: Maciste Dischi
- Songwriter: Filippo Uttinacci
- Producer: Tommaso Colliva

Fulminacci singles chronology
"Un fatto tuo personale" (2020)	"Santa Marinella" (2021)	"Tattica" (2021)

Music video
- "Santa Marinella" on YouTube

"Santa Marinella" is a song written and recorded by Italian singer-songwriter Fulminacci. It was released on 4 March 2021 by Maciste Dischi as the third single from his second studio album Tante care cose.

The song competed during the Sanremo Music Festival 2021 and ranked sixteenth at the end of the competition.

== Music video ==
The music video for "Santa Marinella", directed by Danilo Bubani, premiered on 11 March 2021 via Maciste Dischi's YouTube channel.

== Track listing ==
Digital download
No.	Title	Length
1.	"Santa Marinella"	3:41

== Charts ==
Chart (2021)	Peak position
Italy (FIMI)	19
Italy Airplay (EarOne)	44

== Certifications ==
Region	Certification	Certified units/sales
Italy (FIMI)	Gold	35,000^{‡}
^{‡} Sales+streaming figures based on certification alone.
