= Tante care cose =

Studio album by Fulminacci
- Released: 12 March 2021
- Genre: Indie pop
- Length: 36:42
- Label: Maciste Dischi
- Producer: BRAIL; Frenetik&Orang3; Federico Nardelli; Giordano Colombo; Tommaso Colliga

Fulminacci chronology
La vita veramente (2019)	Tante care cose (2021)	Infinito +1 (2023)

Singles from Tante care cose
- 1. "Canguro" Released: 9 September 2020; 2. "Un fatto tuo personale" Released: 6 December 2020; 3. "Santa Marinella" Released: 4 March 2021; 4. "Tattica" Released: 28 May 2021; 5. "Miss Mondo Africa" Released: 8 October 2021

Tante care cose (lit. 'Many dear things', an Italian greeting for 'best wishes') is the second studio album by Italian singer-songwriter Fulminacci. The album was released on 12 March 2021 and includes the singles "Canguro", "Un fatto tuo personale" and the 2021 Sanremo Music Festival entry "Santa Marinella".

The album was re-released in 2022 as Tante care cose e altri successi, with four additional tracks, including the single "Chitarre blu" and the song "Aglio e olio", featuring vocals by Willie Peyote.

== Track listing ==
Tante care cose – Standard track listing
No.	Title	Lyrics	Music	Producer(s)	Length
1.	"Meglio di così"	Filippo Uttinacci	Uttinacci	Giordano Colombo; Federico Nardelli	3:22
2.	"Santa Marinella"	Uttinacci	Uttinacci	Tommaso Colliva	3:41
3.	"Miss Mondo Africa"	Uttinacci	Uttinacci	Colombo; Nardelli	3:21
4.	"La grande bugia"	Uttinacci	Uttinacci	Colombo; Nardelli	3:29
5.	"Un fatto tuo personale"	Uttinacci	Uttinacci; Daniele Denzi; Daniele Mungai	Frenetik&Orang3	3:15
6.	"Tattica"	Uttinacci	Uttinacci; Colombo; Nardelli	Colombo; Nardelli	3:13
7.	"Canguro"	Uttinacci	Uttinacci; Colombo; Nardelli	Colombo; Nardelli	3:24
8.	"Forte la banda"	Uttinacci	Uttinacci	Colombo; Nardelli	5:00
9.	"Giovane da un po'"	Uttinacci	Uttinacci	Colombo; Nardelli	3:40
10.	"Le biciclette"	Uttinacci	Uttinacci	Colombo; Nardelli	4:17
Total length:					36:42

Tante care cose e altri successi – Deluxe edition bonus tracks
No.	Title	Lyrics	Music	Producer(s)	Length
1.	"Brutte compagnie"	Uttinacci	Uttinacci	Colombo; Nardelli	3:09
2.	"Chitarre blu"	Uttinacci	Uttinacci	Colombo; Nardelli	2:55
5.	"Sembra quasi"	Uttinacci	Uttinacci	BRAIL	3:18
11.	"Aglio e olio" (featuring Willie Peyote)	Uttinacci; Guglielmo Bruno	Uttinacci; Bruno; Colombo; Nardelli	Colombo; Nardelli	3:45
Total length:					36:42

== Charts ==
Chart performance for Tante care cose
Chart (2021)	Peak position
Italian Albums (FIMI)	5

== Certifications ==
Certifications for Tante care cose
Region	Certification	Certified units/sales
Italy (FIMI)	Gold	25,000^{‡}
^{‡} Sales+streaming figures based on certification alone.
