= Canto d'amore =

2026 song by Angelina Mango featuring Marco Mengoni

Single by Angelina Mango featuring Marco Mengoni

from the album Caramé
- Released: 12 June 2026
- Length: 3:14
- Label: LaTarma; Warner
- Songwriters: Angelina Mango; Marco Mengoni; Jacopo Ettorre; Nicola Lazzarin
- Producers: Cripo; E.D.D.

Angelina Mango singles chronology
"Sentire" (2025)	"Canto d'amore" (2026)	"Che bella vita" (2026)

Marco Mengoni singles chronology
"Coming Home" (2025)	"Canto d'amore" (2026)	"Giornate perse" (2026)

Music video
- "Canto d'amore" on YouTube

"Canto d'amore" (transl. Love song) is a song by Italian singer-songwriter Angelina Mango with featured vocals by Marco Mengoni. It was released on 12 June 2026 by LaTarma Records and Warner Music Italy as the first single from the reissue of her second studio album, Caramé.

== Music video ==
The music video, directed by Simone Peluso, was released through Mango's YouTube channel on the same day of the song's release.

== Charts ==
Weekly chart performance for "Canto d'amore"
Chart (2026)	Peak position
Italy (FIMI)	8
Italy Airplay (EarOne)	1

== Certifications ==
Certifications for "Canto d'amore"
Region	Certification	Certified units/sales
Italy (FIMI)	Gold	100,000^{‡}
^{‡} Sales+streaming figures based on certification alone.
