= Fila indiana =

2023 single by Angelina Mango

Single by Angelina Mango

from the album Poké melodrama
- Released: 1 December 2023
- Genre: Synth pop; urban
- Length: 3:13
- Label: LaTarma; BMG
- Songwriter: Angelina Mango
- Producers: E.D.D.; Antonio Cirigliano

Angelina Mango singles chronology
"Che t'o dico a fa'" (2023)	"Fila indiana" (2023)	"La noia" (2024)

Music video
- "Fila indiana" on YouTube

"Fila indiana" (transl. "Single row", lit. 'Indian row') is a song written and recorded by Italian singer-songwriter Angelina Mango. It was released on 1 December 2023 by LaTarma and BMG Rights Management as the second single from her debut studio album Poké melodrama.

The song was also included in the soundtrack of the Rai 2 television series Noi siamo leggenda.

== Personnel ==
Credits adapted from Tidal.

- Angelina Mango – composer, writer and vocals
- E.D.D. – producer
- Antonio Cirigliano – producer, bass, guitars, keyboards, programmer and synthesizer
- Giovanni Pallotti – bass, engineer, keyboards, programmer and synthesizer
- Andrea Suriani – engineer
- Filippo Slaverio – engineer

== Music video ==
A music video to accompany the release of "Fila indiana" was first released onto YouTube on 1 December 2023. The video was edited by Francesco Cerbini with clips from Mango's "Voglia di vivere Tour".

== Charts ==
Chart performance for "Fila indiana"
Chart (2023)	Peak position
Italy (FIMI)	37

== Certifications ==
Certifications for "Fila indiana"
Region	Certification	Certified units/sales
Italy (FIMI)	Gold	50,000^{‡}
^{‡} Sales+streaming figures based on certification alone.
