= Contenta tu =

Studio album by Marco Castello
- Released: 5 February 2021
- Studios: Butterama Studio, Berlin
- Length: 41:18
- Languages: Italian, Sicilian
- Labels: 42 Records, Sony Music
- Producers: Marco Castello, Marcin Öz, Daniel Nentwig

Marco Castello chronology
| Contenta tu (2021) | Pezzi della sera (2023) |

Singles from Contenta Tu
- 1. "Porsi" Released: 6 April 2020; 2. "Torpi" Released: 24 July 2020; 3. "Cicciona" Released: 15 September 2020; 4. "Dopamina" Released: 4 December 2020; 5. "Avò" Released: 18 June 2021

Contenta tu (Italian: [konˈtenta ˈtu]; English: "If that makes you happy" ) is the first studio album by Italian singer-songwriter Marco Castello, published on 5 February 2021 through Sony Music and 42 Records in Italy, while in Europe it was released through Bubbles Records. The album was registered in Berlin, Germany.

== Track listing ==
All tracks are written by Marco Castello.

| No. | Title | Length |
|---|---|---|
| 1. | "Porsi" | 3:23 |
| 2. | "Cicciona" | 3:25 |
| 3. | "Luca" | 3:56 |
| 4. | "Torpi" | 4:12 |
| 5. | "Palla" | 3:58 |
| 6. | "Marchesa" | 3:25 |
| 7. | "Contenta tu" | 3:05 |
| 8. | "Villaggio" | 3:42 |
| 9. | "Addiu" | 5:02 |
| 10. | "Dopamina" | 2:32 |
| 11. | "Avò" | 4:35 |
| Total length: | | 41:18 |
