= Pezzi della sera =

2023 studio album by Marco Castello

Studio album by Marco Castello
- Released: 17 November 2023
- Studios: Butterama Studio, Berlin
- Languages: Italian, Sicilian
- Label: Megghiu Suli

Marco Castello chronology
Contenta tu (2021)	Pezzi della sera (2023)	Quaglia sovversiva (2025)

Singles from Pezzi della sera
- 1. "Dracme" Released: 3 November 2023; 2. "Porci" Released: 10 November 2023

Pezzi della sera (Italian: [ˈpɛttsi ˈdɛlla ˈseːra]; English: "Songs of the Evening") is the second studio album released by Italian singer-songwriter Marco Castello, released firstly in vinyl on 19 September 2023, and then released on streaming platforms on 17 November 2023.

Registered in Berlin, the album was given this name because when Castello and his collaborators revised all the work they had done in the studio during the day, they found the tracks produced in the evening to be the best ones.

== Tracks ==
All tracks are written by Marco Castello.

No.	Title	Length
1.	"Porci"	2:58
2.	"Beddu"	3:22
3.	"Polifemo"	3:10
4.	"Dracme"	3:26
5.	"Sul serio"	4:16
6.	"Pipì"	4:42
7.	"Empireo risolti"	4:07
8.	"Narrazione"	3:50
9.	"Copricolori"	3:47
10.	"Melo"	4:20
