= Quaglia Sovversiva =

2025 studio album by Marco Castello

Quaglia sovversiva

Studio album by Marco Castello
- Released: 12 December 2025
- Length: 34:02
- Languages: Italian, Sicilian
- Label: Megghiu Suli

Marco Castello chronology
| Pezzi della sera (2023) | Quaglia sovversiva (2025) |

Singles from Quaglia sovversiva
- 1. "Editto dal sottoscoglio" Released: 24 October 2025; 2. "All'acqua ghiacciata" Released: 7 November 2025

Quaglia Sovversiva (Italian: [ˈkwaʎʎa sovverˈsiːva]; English: "Subversive Quail") is the third studio album by Italian singer-songwriter Marco Castello, released firstly only in vinyl on 21 November 2025, and then released on digital platforms too on 12 December 2025.

== Tracks ==
All tracks are written by Marco Castello.

| No. | Title | Length |
|---|---|---|
| 1. | "Pompe" | 3:30 |
| 2. | "Vessenali" | 4:32 |
| 3. | "Nascondigli" | 3:30 |
| 4. | "Muti e scippi coppa" | 4:04 |
| 5. | "Editto dal sottoscoglio" | 3:27 |
| 6. | "Fare ninna" | 2:15 |
| 7. | "Chiuvìti/Non chiuvìti" | 2:53 |
| 8. | "Eureka" | 3:27 |
| 9. | "All'acqua ghiacciata" | 3:48 |
| 10. | "Scoglio volante" | 4:36 |
| Total length: | | 34:02 |
