= Poké melodrama =

Studio album by Angelina Mango
- Released: 31 May 2024
- Genre: Pop; R&B; trap
- Length: 38:44
- Language: Italian
- Label: Warner Music Italy
- Producer: Andry the Hitmaker; Antonio Cirigliano; Cripo; Dardust; E.D.D.; Edwyn Roberts; Filippo Mango; okgiorgio; Shune; Strage; Zef

Angelina Mango chronology
| Voglia di vivere (2023) | Poké melodrama (2024) | Caramé (2025) |

Singles from Poké melodrama
- 1. "Che t'o dico a fa'" Released: 6 October 2023; 2. "Fila indiana" Released: 1 December 2023; 3. "La noia" Released: 7 February 2024; 4. "Melodrama" Released: 24 May 2024

Poké melodrama is the debut studio album by Italian singer-songwriter Angelina Mango. It was released on 31 May 2024 through Warner Music Italy. The album include the Sanremo-winning entry "La noia", which also represented Italy at the Eurovision Song Contest 2024.

The album includes featured guest collaborations with Italian singers Marco Mengoni and Bresh and Italian rappers Dani Faiv and VillaBanks, and singles "Che t'o dico a fa'", "Fila indiana" and "Melodrama". It debuted at number one on the Italian Albums Chart, becoming Mango second consecutive record project to achieve a top three debut.

== Composition ==
The album featured fourteen songs, including collaborations with Marco Mengoni, Bresh, Dani Faiv, and VillaBanks. In an interview with Rockol Mango explained the meaning of the album and its production process:

I was afraid that this record would be too heterogeneous. I thought to myself: can I make a record with so many different musical directions? Then I answered myself: that, however, is really its strength. When I go into the studio I never have a goal, I never know what I want to do, I let the music transport me. The only way to be consistent with myself was to be inconsistent in my music. Yes, I tell my house, my roots, and I do that by going from one song to the next, the common denominator is just me, my story.

== Critics reception ==
Poké melodrama received generally favorable reviews from Italian music critics.

Gianni Sibilla of Rockol associated the album with the word "heterogeneity" because "she goes from one musical genre to another, often combining them and mixing them until they become one." Although the journalist believed that the singer manages "to attend all these genres with a remarkable naturalness," demonstrating "a very strong musical personality and an immediate recognizability," he stated that in the future the artist "will have to make choices, turn her music into dish with less flavors, but stronger and even more defined."

Claudio Tudesco of Rolling Stone Italia wrote that the project "hints at the possibility that Italian pop can be made in a slightly different way than usual" associating it with a coming-of-age novel in the lyrics that deal with "typical teenage headshots, a life to be understood and invented." However, he found a "heap of authors and producers," not feeling Mango's talent was enhanced in the collaborations, stating that "if they had pushed the accelerator on the search for a more original sound by putting a couple of less pieces, Poké Melodrama would have been better than it is."

In a negative review, Antonio Silvestri of Ondarock described the album "mismatched and stereotyped" consisting of "shameless mix of pop styles in bulk into which to throw different moods" with "immature lyrics". Silvestri focused on two tracks, describing "Gioielli di famiglia" as an "unacceptable banality" with "rehashed orchestral arrangement" and the collaboration "Uguale a me" a "pure cliché between vocals and suffering lyrics".

== Track listing ==
Poké melodrama track listing
| No. | Title | Lyrics | Music | Producer(s) | Length |
|---|---|---|---|---|---|
| 1. | "Gioielli di famiglia" | Angelina Mango | Mango; Antonio Cirigliano; Leonardo Zaccaria; Michele Canova; Vincenzo Colella | E.D.D.; Antonio Cirigliano | 2:49 |
| 2. | "Melodrama" | Mango; Federica Abbate; Alessandro La Cava | Mango; Abbate; La Cava; Nicola Lazzarin | E.D.D.; Cripo | 2:27 |
| 3. | "La noia" | Mango; Francesca Calearo | Mango; Dario Faini; Calearo | Dardust; E.D.D. | 3:09 |
| 4. | "Uguale a me" (featuring Marco Mengoni) | Mango; Marco Mengoni; Alfredo Rapetti; Stefano Marletta | Mango; Marletta; Edwyn Roberts | E.D.D.; Edwyn Roberts | 3:04 |
| 5. | "Crush" | Mango | Mango; Cirigliano | Cirigliano | 2:32 |
| 6. | "Smile" | Mango | Mango; Cirigliano | Cirigliano | 2:21 |
| 7. | "Diamoci una tregua" (featuring Bresh) | Mango; Andrea Brasi | Mango; Brasi; Luca De Blasi; Luca Ghiazzi | E.D.D.; Shune | 3:05 |
| 8. | "Edmund e Lucy" | Mango | Mango; Filippo Mango | E.D.D.; F. Mango | 3:16 |
| 9. | "Cup of Tea" | Mango | Mango; Andrea Moroni; Marco Marra | Andry The Hitmaker | 2:38 |
| 10. | "Una bella canzone" | Mango | Mango; Giorgio Pesenti | okgiorgio | 2:39 |
| 11. | "Fila indiana" | Mango | Mango | E.D.D.; Cirigliano | 3:13 |
| 12. | "Invece sì" (featuring Dani Faiv) | Mango; Daniele Ceccaroni | Mango; Luca Galeandro | Strage | 2:04 |
| 13. | "Che t'o dico a fa'" | Mango; La Cava | Mango; La Cava; Stefano Tognini; Alessandro De Crescenzo | Cirigliano; E.D.D.; Zef | 3:07 |
| 14. | "Another World" (featuring VillaBanks) | Mango; Vieri Igor Traxler | Mango; Traxler; Moroni | Andry the Hitmaker | 2:20 |
| Total length: | | | | | 38:44 |

== Charts ==
=== Weekly charts ===
Weekly chart performance for Poké melodrama
| Chart (2024) | Peak position |
|---|---|
| Italian Albums (FIMI) | 1 |

=== Year-end charts ===
2024 year-end chart performance for Poké melodrama
| Chart (2024) | Position |
|---|---|
| Italian Albums (FIMI) | 34 |

== Certifications ==
Certifications for Poké melodrama
| Region | Certification | Certified units/sales |
|---|---|---|
| Italy (FIMI) | Platinum | 50,000^{‡} |
^{‡} Sales+streaming figures based on certification alone.

== Year-end list ==
Selected year-end rankings of Poké melodrama
| Publication | List | Rank | Ref. |
|---|---|---|---|
| Rolling Stone | The 25 Best Italian Albums of 2024 | 21 | |
