= Elena Di Cioccio =

Italian actress (born 1974)

Elena Maria Ida Di Cioccio (born in Milan, 16 September 1974) is an Italian actress, disc jockey, television and radio presenter.

== Radio ==
The radio debut came in 2001 on Radio Lupo Solitario, issuer free in the province of Varese and the following year entered the team of Radio RockFM. In 2004 she participated in the revival of Radio Parma and the launch of Radio Milano/Roma Uno. In 2005 she came to Radio Dimensione Suono, where she remained for the next two years. In 2007 she started at Radio Deejay, where she led the program "Coming Out" on air every Thursday evening from 22:30 to midnight. In 2008, she was on Capital Radio with the "Navigator".

== Television ==
In 2004, she wrote and led the TV program Fuoriclasse to TV Parma; wrote and conducted the program "I Love Rock N Roll" aired on All Music; and was narrator of the "MONO" broadcast on All Music.

In 2005, second edition of the program "I Love Rock N Roll" aired on All Music. She wrote and conducted special "Heineken Jammin Festival" broadcast on All Music and was narrator of the "MONO" broadcast on All Music.

2006: received an invitation of the program's cult of Italy One "Le Iene"; Third edition of the "I Love Rock N Roll" aired on All Music; Narrator of the "MONO" broadcast on All Music; Voice network "All Music".

2007: "Reservoir Dogs", Uno Italy; "I Love Rock 'n'Roll", All Music; "I Love Rock 'n'Roll, on the streets of California, All Music; Voice network "All Music"

2008: "Reservoir Dogs" (Italy A); "I Love Rock 'n'Roll" (All Music); "Scalo 76", "Cargo" and "Stracult Show" on RAI 2

2009: sent to the "Reservoir Dogs" (Italy A); wrote and conducted "I Love Rock 'n'Roll" (All Music); led "Stracult Show" and "score" on RAI 2
