= Ci pensiamo domani =

2023 single by Angelina Mango

Single by Angelina Mango

from the EP Voglia di vivere
- Language: Italian
- Released: 13 May 2023
- Genre: Dance-pop
- Length: 3:00
- Label: 21CO; LaTarma; BMG
- Songwriters: Angelina Mango; Filippo Uttinacci; Alessandro La Cava; Stefano Tognini
- Producer: Zef

Angelina Mango singles chronology
"Mani vuote" (2023)	"Ci pensiamo domani" (2023)	"Che t'o dico a fa'" (2023)

Music video
- "Ci pensiamo domani" on YouTube

"Ci pensiamo domani" (lit. 'We'll think about it tomorrow') is a song co-written and recorded by Italian singer-songwriter Angelina Mango. It was released on 13 May 2023 as the third single from her second extended play Voglia di vivere.

The song premiered during the show Amici di Maria De Filippi, in which Mango was a contestant.

== Charts ==
=== Weekly charts ===
Weekly chart performance for "Ci pensiamo domani"
Chart (2023)	Peak position
Italy (FIMI)	7
Italy Airplay (EarOne)	7
San Marino (SMRRTV Top 50)	21

=== Year-end charts ===
2023 year-end chart performance for "Ci pensiamo domani"
Chart (2023)	Position
Italy (FIMI)	19

2024 year-end chart performance for "Ci pensiamo domani"
Chart (2024)	Position
Italy (FIMI)	61

== Certifications ==
Region	Certification	Certified units/sales
Italy (FIMI)	4× Platinum	400,000^{‡}
^{‡} Sales+streaming figures based on certification alone.
