= Velo sugli occhi =

Single by Angelina Mango

from the album Caramé
- Released: 17 October 2025
- Genre: Pop
- Length: 3:32
- Label: LaTarma; Warner
- Songwriter: Angelina Mango
- Producers: Angelina Mango; E.D.D.

Angelina Mango singles chronology
| "Per due come noi" (2025) | "Velo sugli occhi" (2025) | "Sentire" (2025) |

Music video
- "Velo sugli occhi" on YouTube

"Velo sugli occhi" (transl. Veil over the eyes) is a song written, recorded and produced by Italian singer-songwriter Angelina Mango. It was released on 17 October 2025 by LaTarma Records and Warner Music Italy as the lead single from her second studio album, Caramé.

== Description ==
The song was written and composed by the singer-songwriter herself, who also handled the production with Giovanni Pallotti, aka E.D.D.. On 17 October 2025, the song entered radio rotation as the first single from the album Caramé, released as a surprise the previous day.

== Music video ==
The music video, directed by Antonio Agostinelli, was released on 16 October 2025 through the Angelina Mango's YouTube channel.

== Charts ==
Weekly chart performance for "Velo sugli occhi"
| Chart (2025) | Peak position |
|---|---|
| Italy (FIMI) | 48 |
| Italy Airplay (EarOne) | 18 |
