= Che t'o dico a fa' =

2023 single by Angelina Mango

Single by Angelina Mango

from the album Poké melodrama
- Language: Italian; Neapolitan
- Released: 6 October 2023
- Genre: Folk-pop; dance-pop
- Length: 3:07
- Label: LaTarma; BMG
- Songwriters: Angelina Mango; Alessandro La Cava; Alessandro De Crescenzo; Stefano Tognini
- Producers: Antonio Cirigliano; E.D.D.; Zef

Angelina Mango singles chronology
"Ci pensiamo domani" (2023)	"Che t'o dico a fa'" (2023)	"Fila indiana" (2023)

Music video
- "Che t'o dico a fa" on YouTube

"Che t'o dico a fa'" (Neapolitan: [ke tto dˈdiːk a fˈfa]; lit. 'What am I telling you for') is a song co-written and recorded by Italian singer-songwriter Angelina Mango, released on 6 October 2023 as the lead single from her debut studio album, Poké melodrama.

Partly sung in Neapolitan, the song debuted in third place in the FIMI single chart, marking the best debut by a solo female artist in the chart in 2023.

== Charts ==
=== Weekly charts ===
Weekly chart performance for "che t'o dico a fa'"
Chart (2023)	Peak position
Italy (FIMI)	2
Italy Airplay (EarOne)	1

=== Year-end charts ===
2024 year-end chart performance for "che t'o dico a fa'"
Chart (2024)	Position
Italy (FIMI)	69

== Certifications ==
Region	Certification	Certified units/sales
Italy (FIMI)	2× Platinum	200,000^{‡}
^{‡} Sales+streaming figures based on certification alone.
