= Melodrama (Angelina Mango song) =

2024 single by Angelina Mango

Single by Angelina Mango

from the album Poké melodrama
- Released: 24 May 2024
- Genre: Alternative pop
- Length: 2:27
- Label: LaTarma; Warner
- Songwriters: Angelina Mango; Federica Abbate; Alessandro La Cava; Nicola Lazzarin
- Producers: E.D.D.; Cripo

Angelina Mango singles chronology
"La noia" (2024)	"Melodrama" (2024)	"Per due come noi" (2024)

Music video
- "Melodrama" on YouTube

"Melodrama" is a song co-written and recorded by Italian singer-songwriter Angelina Mango. It was released on 24 May 2024 by LaTarma and Warner Music Italy as the fourth single from her debut studio album, Poké melodrama.

== Personnel ==
- Angelina Mango – lyricist, composer and vocals
- Alessandro La Cava – lyricist and composer
- Federica Abbate – lyricist and composer
- Nicola Lazzarin – composer
- Andrea Suriani – engineering
- Cripo – producer
- E.D.D. – producer

== Music video ==
A music video to accompany the release of "Melodrama", directed by Simone Peluso, was first released on 24 May 2024 via Mango's YouTube channel.

== Charts ==
=== Weekly charts ===
Weekly chart performance for "Melodrama"
Chart (2024)	Peak position
Italy (FIMI)	16
Italy Airplay (EarOne)	9

=== Year-end charts ===
2024 year-end chart performance for "Melodrama"
Chart (2024)	Position
Italy (FIMI)	89

== Certifications ==
Certifications for "Melodrama"
Region	Certification	Certified units/sales
Italy (FIMI)	Platinum	100,000^{‡}
^{‡} Sales+streaming figures based on certification alone.
