= La noia (song) =

2024 single by Angelina Mango

Single by Angelina Mango

from the album Poké melodrama
- Language: Italian
- Released: 7 February 2024
- Genre: Pop; cumbia; folk; dance
- Length: 3:09 (original version); 3:01 (Eurovision version)
- Label: Warner Music Italy
- Songwriters: Angelina Mango; Francesca Calearo; Dario Faini
- Producer: Dardust

Angelina Mango singles chronology
"Fila indiana" (2023)	"La noia" (2024)	"Melodrama" (2024)

Music video
- "La noia" on YouTube

Eurovision Song Contest 2024 entry
- Country: Italy
- Artist: Angelina Mango
- Language: Italian
- Composers: Angelina Mango; Dario Faini; Francesca Calearo
- Lyricists: Angelina Mango; Francesca Calearo

Finals performance
- Final result: 7th
- Final points: 268

Entry chronology
- ◄ "Due vite" (2023)
- "Volevo essere un duro" (2025) ►

Official performance video
- "La noia" (Second Semi-Final) on YouTube "La noia" (Grand Final) on YouTube

"La noia" (Italian pronunciation: [la ˈnɔːja]; transl. "Boredom") is a song co-written and recorded by Italian singer-songwriter Angelina Mango, released on 7 February 2024 as the third single from her debut studio album, Poké melodrama. It was written by Mango, Madame and Dardust, and produced by Dardust. The song served as Angelina Mango's winning entry for the Sanremo Music Festival 2024, making her the first female artist to win the festival in ten years, and additionally received the "Giancarlo Bigazzi" Award for the best musical composition.

As the festival also doubled as the selection of the Italian act for the Eurovision Song Contest 2024, "La noia" went on to represent the country at the event, where it finished in 7th place at the final with 268 points. The song reached number four on the Italian singles chart and has been certified triple platinum by the FIMI, for selling over 300,000 units. It also reached the charts in Switzerland, San Marino, Croatia and Greece.

A bilingual Spanish-Italian remixed version featuring Álvaro de Luna was released on 3 May 2024.

== Composition ==
The song was written by Angelina Mango with Madame and produced by Dardust. The singer confirmed that it is inspired in its rhythms by cumbia:

"I met with Madame and Dardust humanly, even before we met artistically, and that helped us find the line of the song: when I heard the sample, I thought it might be good for Sanremo. The idea of cumbia came out while chatting with them; it's the way I deal with life. [...] [This song came out of] a reflection on time. Boredom is seen as a negative thing, but actually it is time that you dedicate to yourself, it allows you to discover yourself. Between a life of highs and lows and one of boredom, I will always choose one of highs and lows, but I will always leave myself time for boredom [as well]."

== Critical reception ==
The song has received generally favourable reviews from Italian music critics.

Andrea Laffranchi of Corriere della Sera described the song as "upbeat, fresh, carefree" with "a latin soul" and "a refrain that smells of Mediterranean tradition." Silvia Danielli of Billboard Italia wrote that the sounds are associated with reggaeton and cumbia, finding it "an excellent hit" with "interesting" lyrics. Filippo Ferrari of Rolling Stone Italia appreciated the production, reporting that it "will amaze those who have not yet focused on it." Il Messaggero stated that the narrative style of Madame is perceptible, while Dardust is recognizable "in the guitars of the refrain." Andrea Conti of Il Fatto Quotidiano said the song "comes straight away, so straight, leaving no escape" whose lyrics come across as "a wide-ranging reflection on life, from relationships to business," on which Mango "sings beautifully."

Leila Sales of Spin described the song as a "a catchy, cumbia-inspired pop song" where the title "translates to "The Boredom", though I would not describe this as a boring song".

== Music video ==
A music video to accompany the release of "La noia", directed by Giulio Rosati, was first released onto YouTube on 7 February 2024. Alessia Musillo of Elle Decor Italia associated the image of the singer to Medusa and describe the narrative as the representation of "the process of dressing a sacred woman", in which "the braided hair looks like tree branches and resembles, without veils, the head of a Gorgon out of its time".

== Sanremo Music Festival ==
Italian broadcaster RAI organised the 74th edition of the Sanremo Music Festival between 6 and 10 February 2024. As had been the case since 2015, the winner would earn the right of first refusal to represent Italy at the upcoming Eurovision Song Contest.

On 3 December 2023, Angelina Mango, was announced among the participants of the festival, with the title of her competing entry revealed the following 19 December. Mango went on to win the festival, coming second with the public and first with the press and radio juries in the final round of voting.

== Eurovision Song Contest ==
The Eurovision Song Contest 2024 took place at the Malmö Arena in Malmö, Sweden, and consisted of two semi-finals held on the respective dates of 7 and 9 May and the final on 11 May 2024. As a member of the "Big Five", Italy automatically qualifies for the final.

Discussing her participation in Eurovision, Mango commented that she and the songwriting team were considering the possibility to change part of the lyrics to English or Spanish ahead of the contest. On 6 March 2024, RAI released an official statement of participation, confirming that the song had been reworked to comply with Eurovision regulations requiring that entries do not exceed a length of 3 minutes, and shortly after Mango confirmed that the lyrics would remain in Italian. For the revamp, two verse repetitions were cut from one chorus.

At the end of the contest the song placed placed 4th on the jury ranking and 7th on the televoting, placing seventh in the final combined ranking.

== Charts ==
=== Weekly charts ===
Weekly chart performance for "La noia"
Chart (2024)	Peak position
Austria (Ö3 Austria Top 40)	57
Croatia (Billboard)	11
Croatia International Airplay (Top lista)	6
Global 200 (Billboard)	110
Greece International (IFPI)	3
Ireland (IRMA)	94
Italy (FIMI)	4
Italy Airplay (EarOne)	1
Latvia Streaming (LAIPA)	19
Lithuania (AGATA)	11
Netherlands (Single Top 100)	63
Poland (Polish Streaming Top 100)	84
Portugal (AFP)	172
Spain (PROMUSICAE)	79
Sweden (Sverigetopplistan)	54
Switzerland (Schweizer Hitparade)	11
UK Indie (Official Charts)	50
UK Singles Downloads (Official Charts)	55
UK Singles Sales (OCC)	56

=== Year-end charts ===
2024 year-end chart performance for "La noia"
Chart (2024)	Position
Italy (FIMI)	8

== Certifications ==
Certifications for "La noia"
Region	Certification	Certified units/sales
Italy (FIMI)	3× Platinum	300,000^{‡}
Switzerland (IFPI Switzerland)	Gold	15,000^{‡}
^{‡} Sales+streaming figures based on certification alone.

== Release history ==
"La noia" release history
Region	Date	Format(s)	Version	Label(s)	Ref.
Italy	7 February 2024	Radio airplay	Original	Warner Music Italy	
Various	7 February 2024	Digital download; streaming	Original	Warner Music Italy	
Various	3 May 2024	Digital download; streaming	Spanish version	Warner Music Italy	
Various	19 July 2024	Digital download; streaming	Hypaton remix	Warner Music Italy	
