= Voglia di vivere (song) =

Single by Angelina Mango

from the EP Voglia di vivere
- Released: 11 January 2023
- Genre: Pop
- Length: 2:24
- Label: LaTarma; BMG
- Songwriters: Angelina Mango; Giorgio Pesenti
- Producer: Michelangelo

Angelina Mango singles chronology
| "Rituali" (2022) | "Voglia di vivere" (2023) | "Mani vuote" (2023) |

"Voglia di vivere" is a song written and recorded by Italian singer-songwriter Angelina Mango. It was released on 11 January 2023 by LaTarma and BMG Rights Management as the lead single from her second extended play by the same name.

The song was written by Mango and Giorgio Pesenti, and produced by Michelangelo.

== Personnel ==
Credits adapted from Tidal.

- Angelina Mango – composer, writer and vocals
- Michelangelo – producer, bass, engineer, keyboards, programmer and synthesizer
- Giorgio Pesenti – composer and writer

== Charts ==
Chart performance for "Voglia di vivere"
| Chart (2023) | Peak position |
|---|---|
| Italy (FIMI) | 87 |

== Certifications ==
Certifications for "Voglia di vivere"
| Region | Certification | Certified units/sales |
|---|---|---|
| Italy (FIMI) | Gold | 50,000^{‡} |
^{‡} Sales+streaming figures based on certification alone.
