= Voglia di vivere (EP) =

EP by Angelina Mango
- Released: 19 May 2023
- Length: 15:33
- Language: Italian
- Label: 21CO; BMG
- Producer: Antonio Cirigliano; Michele Canova; Enrico Brun; Michelangelo; Zef

Angelina Mango chronology
Monolocale (2020)	Voglia di vivere (2023)	Poké melodrama (2024)

Singles from Voglia di vivere
- 1. "Voglia di vivere" Released: 11 January 2023; 2. "Mani vuote" Released: 13 March 2023; 3. "Ci pensiamo domani" Released: 12 May 2023

Voglia di vivere (literally: Lust for life) is the second extended play by Italian singer Angelina Mango. It was released on 19 May 2023 through 21CO and BMG Rights Management and peaked at number 2 on the Italian Albums Chart.

The EP includes the hit single "Ci pensiamo domani", which was certified quadruple platinum in Italy.

== Track listing ==
Voglia di vivere track listing
No.	Title	Writer(s)	Producer(s)	Length
1.	"Ci pensiamo domani"	Angelina Mango; Alessandro La Cava; Fulminacci; Stefano Tognini	Zef	3:00
2.	"Mani vuote"	Mango	Michele Canova	3:04
3.	"Voglia di vivere"	Mango; Giorgio Pesenti	Michelangelo	2:24
4.	"Vita morte e miracoli"	Mango; Enrico Brun; Matteo Marino	Enrico Brun	2:40
5.	"Eccetera"	Mango; Anastasio; Antonio Cirigliano	Antonio Cirigliano	2:39
6.	"Nove maggio" (Liberato cover)	Liberato	Antonio Cirigliano	1:44

== Charts ==
=== Weekly charts ===
Weekly chart performance for Voglia di vivere
Chart (2023)	Peak position
Italian Albums (FIMI)	2

=== Year-end charts ===
Year-end chart performance for Voglia di vivere
Chart (2023)	Position
Italian Albums (FIMI)	47

== Certifications ==
Certifications for Voglia di vivere
Region	Certification	Certified units/sales
Italy (FIMI)	Platinum	50,000^{‡}
^{‡} Sales+streaming figures based on certification alone.
