= Angelina Mango =

Italian singer-songwriter (born 2001)

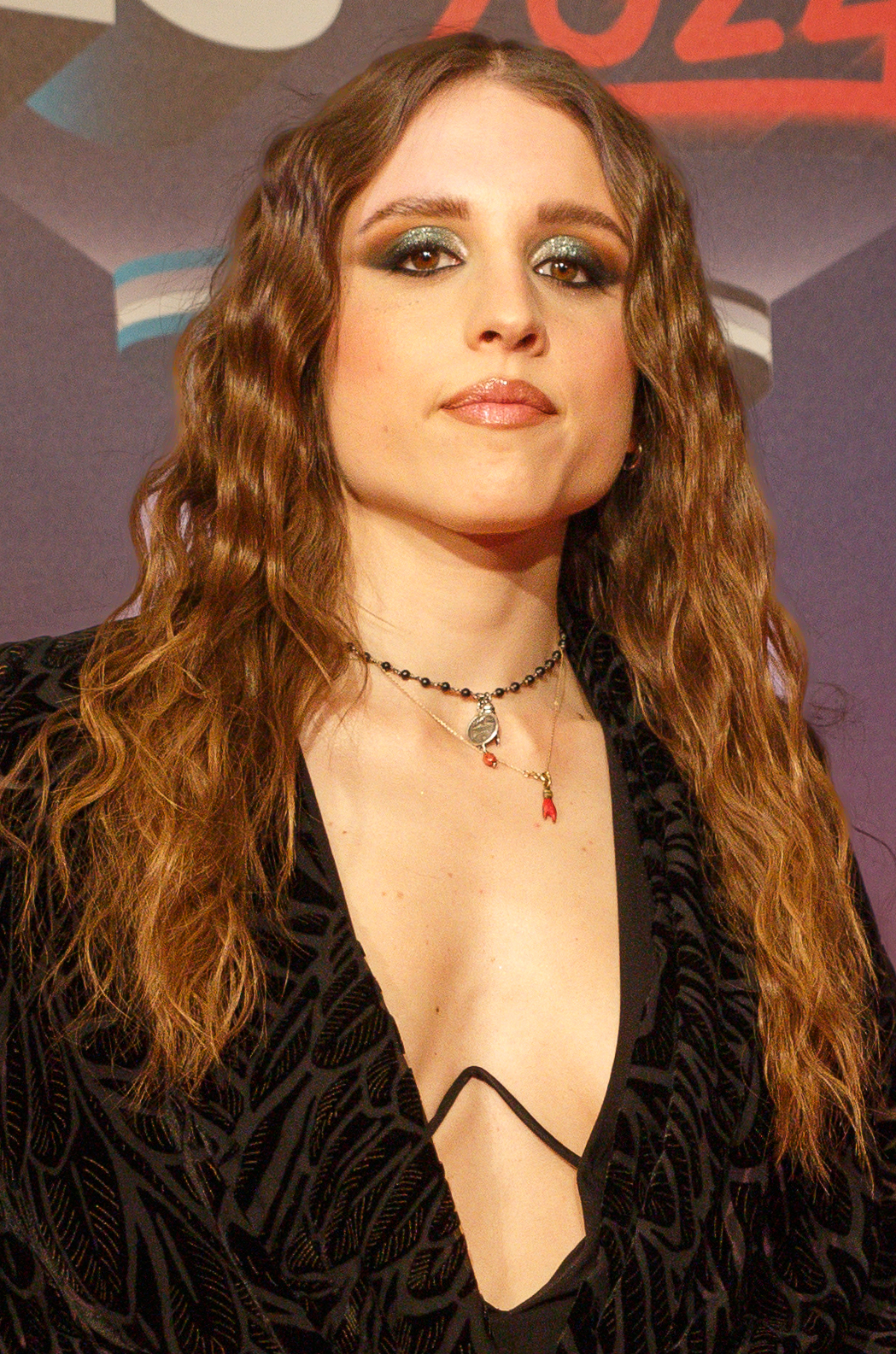
- Angelina Mango in May 2024
- Born: 10 April 2001 (age 25); Maratea, Basilicata, Italy
- Parents: Giuseppe Mango (father); Laura Valente (mother)
- Musical career
- Genre: Pop
- Occupations: Singer; songwriter
- Instruments: Vocals; piano
- Works: Discography
- Years active: 2020–present
- Labels: LaTarma; BMG; Warner

Logo

Angelina Mango (Italian: [andʒeˈliːna ˈmaŋɡo]; born 10 April 2001) is an Italian singer-songwriter.

Her singles "Ci pensiamo domani" and "Che t'o dico a fa'" peaked within the top ten on the Italian singles chart in 2023, and her second extended play Voglia di vivere reached number two on the Italian Albums Chart.

In 2023, she participated in the twenty-second edition of the Amici di Maria De Filippi talent contest, finishing second and winning the singing category. Mango won the Sanremo Music Festival 2024 with her song "La noia", and represented Italy in the Eurovision Song Contest 2024, where she placed 7th.

== Early life ==
Angelina Mango was born on 10 April 2001 in Maratea, in the province of Potenza, Basilicata, to Pino Mango, simply known as Mango, and Laura Valente, former vocalist of Matia Bazar.

She was raised in Lagonegro, also in the province of Potenza, with her older brother Filippo (born 1995), with whom she shares a passion for music. Growing up in a musical family environment, she learned to sing and to play the piano and the guitar. At the age of 5, she took up dance, which she practiced for 10 years. She joined a cover band as a singer, where her brother played the drums, performing in several clubs around their hometown. She did her first studio appearance at 10 on Mango's La terra degli aquiloni as backing vocalist and later performing "Get Back" by The Beatles in duet with her father, on his last record L'amore è invisibile.

In September 2014, she enrolled at Liceo Scientifico Statale "Dante Alighieri" in Matera, before suspending her studies following her father's death on 8 December of the same year. In 2016, she moved to Milan with her mother and brother, where she continued her studies and started singing in a band with her brother as a drummer.

== Career ==
=== 2020–2021: Monolocale ===
On 13 November 2020, Mango released her first single "Va tutto bene", which anticipated her debut extended play Monolocale. In 2021, she opened the concerts of the Parola Tour by Giovanni Caccamo and Michele Placido, performing in November 2021 during the Milan Music Week. In the same period, she participated in the selections of Sanremo Giovani, with the song "La tua buona colazione", not being selected among the finalists.

=== 2022–2023: participation in Amici, and Voglia di vivere EP ===
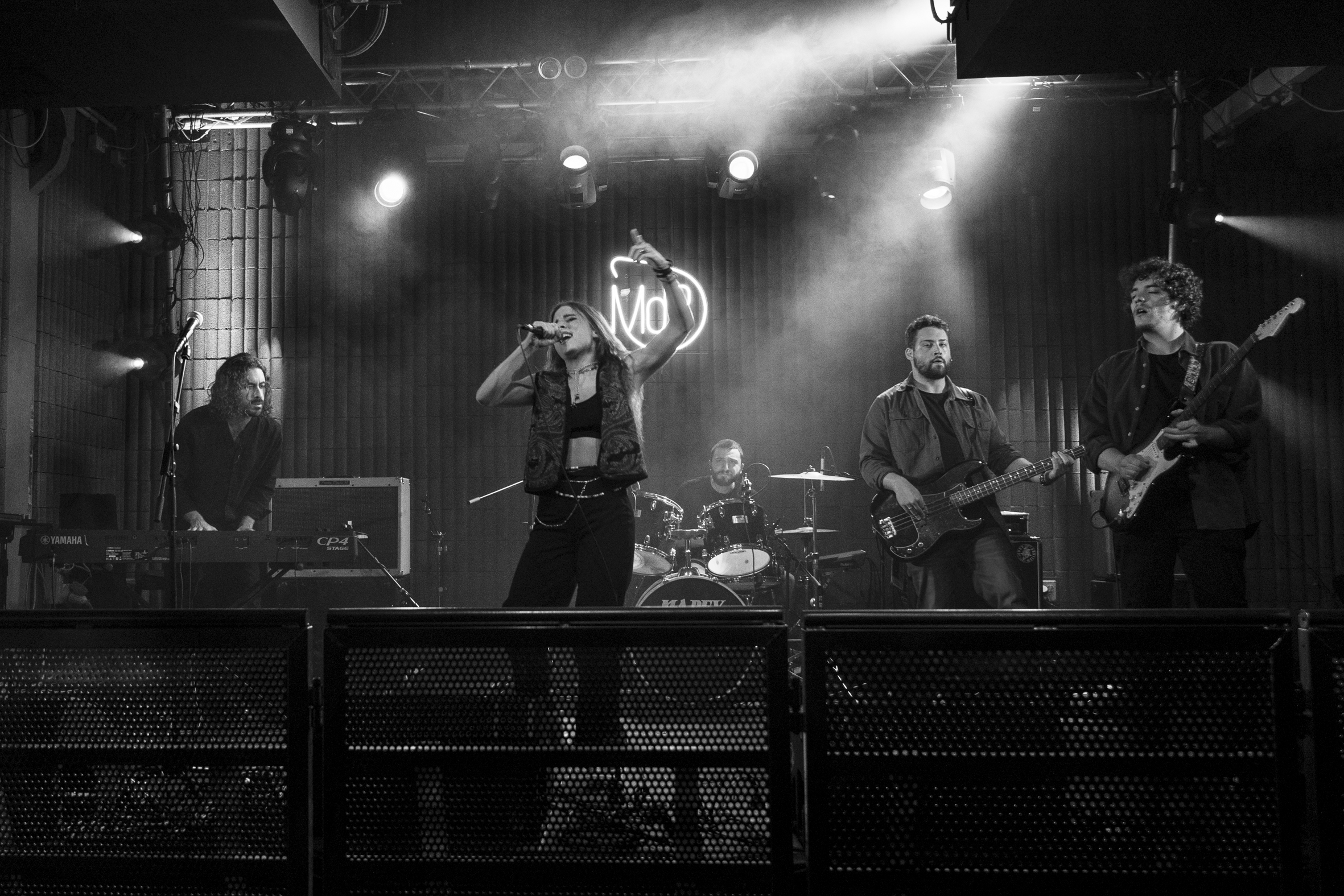
Mango performing live in 2022

After signing a contract with Sony Music and starting to write and produce new songs together with producer Enrico Bruni, Mango participated in the Concerto del Primo Maggio and in the Musica da bere music competition in 2022, where she won the Live Award. Also in the same year, she began to publish some singles, including "Formica", "Walkman" (produced by Tiziano Ferro), and "Rituali". In September 2022, she participated as a guest in the program broadcast on Rai 3 Via dei Matti nº0.

In November 2022, Mango was admitted as a competitor to the twenty-second edition of the musical talent show broadcast on Canale 5, Amici di Maria De Filippi, in which she finished in second place and won the singing category. She opened Elisa's concert at the Auditorium Parco della Musica in Rome on December, and performed at the concert broadcast on Canale 5, Capodanno in musica. During her participation in Amici, she released the singles "Voglia di vivere" and "Mani vuote".

On 12 May 2023, Mango released the single "Ci pensiamo domani", which anticipated the EP Voglia di vivere, released on 19 May 2023. "Ci pensiamo domani" reached the top ten of the singles chart and was certified 4× platinum for sales exceeding 400,000 copies. The EP debuted at number two on the Italian albums chart and was certified gold for sales exceeding 25,000 copies. In June and July 2023, she participated in some festivals organized by the major national radio and television broadcasters, including Battiti Live and TIM Summer Hits. On 6 October 2023, she released the single "Che t'o dico a fa'", which reached number two on the Italian singles chart and was certified double platinum.

=== 2024: Sanremo Music Festival and Eurovision Song Contest ===
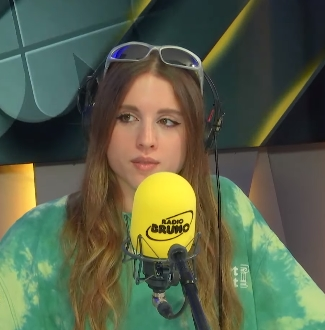
Mango in 2023

Angelina Mango competed in and won the Sanremo Music Festival 2024 with the song "La noia". The song won several accolades, including the Critics Award, Radio Award and the Lunezia Award for her songwriting contribution. During the competition, she also performed a rearranged version of "La rondine", originally performed by her father, ranking number 2 in the fourth night dedicated to live covers.

The morning after her victory, she confirmed that she would represent Italy in the Eurovision Song Contest 2024. She went on to achieve 7th place (out of 26) in the final standings. Following the contest, Mango has gone on to perform at the Isle of Wight Festival on 22 June 2024.

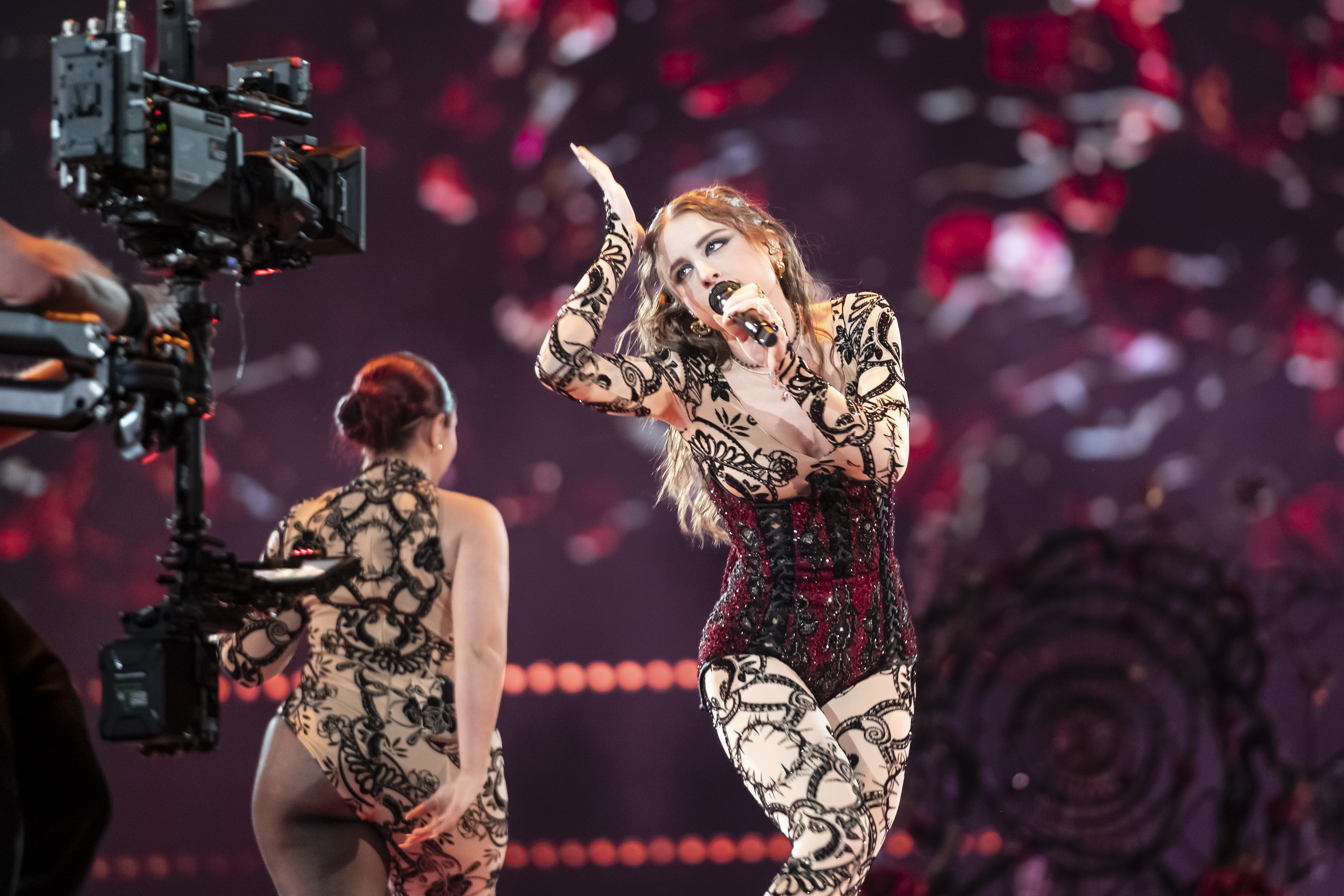
Angelina Mango performing at Eurovision Song Contest 2024 dress rehearsal

=== 2025–present: Caramé ===
On 16 October 2025, Mango unexpectedly returned from a one-year hiatus and released her second studio album Caramé. The album features sixteen tracks, including a collaboration with Italian rapper Madame and a closing song performed entirely by Henna. Caramé He then reached the fourth position on the FIMI Albums Chart and was described as a personal and experimental body of work. Mango wrote and co-produced all tracks, often working with her brother Filippo Mango and collaborators Giovanni Pallotti and Dardust. The day after the album release, the single "Velo sugli occhi" was sent to Italian radio as the lead single.

== Personal life ==
From mid-2021 to late-2024, Mango had been in a relationship with her guitarist Antonio Cirigliano, a native of Potenza. She has stated that she could fall in love with anyone regardless of gender.

== Discography ==
- Poké melodrama (2024)
- Caramé (2025)

== Television ==
Year	Title	Network	Role	Notes
2022–2023	Amici di Maria De Filippi	Canale 5	Contestant	Runner up and winner of the singing category
2024	Sanremo Music Festival 2024	Rai 1	Contestant	Annual music festival – Winner with the song "La noia"
2024	Eurovision Song Contest 2024	Rai 1, EBU	Contestant	Annual music festival – Contestant with the song "La noia"

== Awards and nominations ==
Year	Award	Nomination	Work	Result	Notes
2022	Musica da bere	Live Award		Won	
2023	Critics Award	First place in the Singing category	Herself (at Amici di Maria De Filippi)	Won	
2023	Radio Award	First place in the Singing category	Herself (at Amici di Maria De Filippi)	Won	
2023	Lunezia Award	Musical-literary value	"Ci pensiamo domani"	Won	
2024	Sanremo Music Festival	Big Artists	"La noia"	1st place	
2024	Eurovision Song Contest		"La noia"	7th place	
2024	OGAE Poll	Best Song of Eurovision 2024	"La noia"	2nd place	
2024	MTV Europe Music Awards	Best Italian Act	Herself	Nominated	
2024	Nickelodeon Kids' Choice Awards	Best Singer (Italy)	Herself	Won	
2024	Eurovision Awards	Miss Congeniality	Herself	Nominated	
2024	Eurovision Awards	Most Rizz	Herself	Won	
2024	Social Artist Awards	Best Album	Poké melodrama	Won	
2025	Videoclip Italia Awards	Best Pop Video	"Melodrama"	Nominated	
2025	Videoclip Italia Awards	Best Scenography	"Melodrama"	Nominated	
2025	Videoclip Italia Awards	Best Styling	"Melodrama"	Nominated	

Awards and achievements
Preceded by Marco Mengoni	Sanremo Music Festival; Winner; 2024	Succeeded by Olly
Preceded by Marco Mengoni with "Due vite"	Italy in the Eurovision Song Contest; 2024	Succeeded by Lucio Corsi with "Volevo essere un duro"
