= Lucio Corsi discography =

Discography of Italian singer-songwriter Lucio Corsi

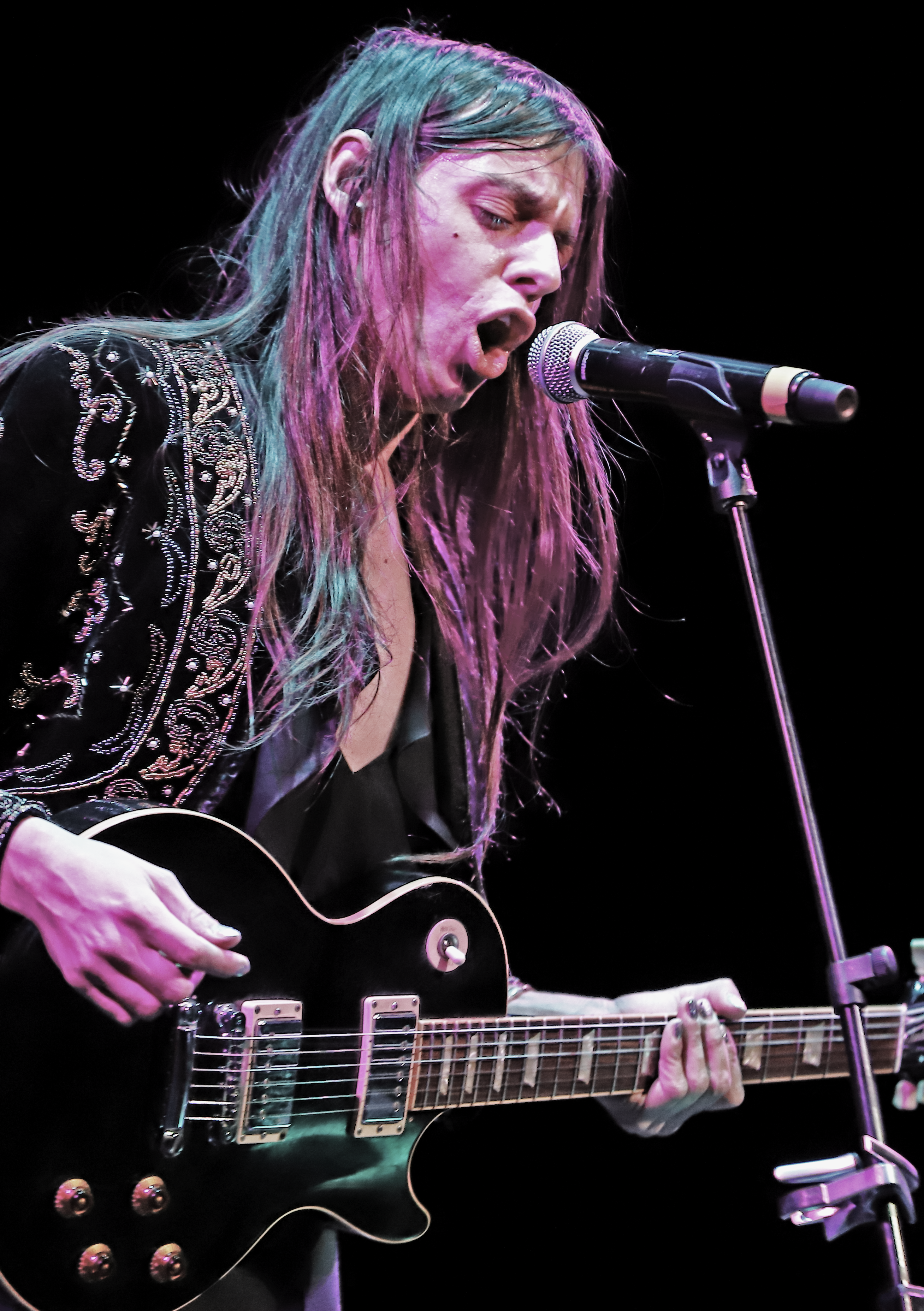
- Lucio Corsi performs live at the Auditorium Parco della Musica, 1 March 2020
- Studio albums: 4
- EPs: 2
- Live albums: 1
- Compilation albums: 1
- Singles: 10
- Music videos: 16

The discography of Italian singer-songwriter Lucio Corsi consists of four studio albums, one live album, one compilation album, two EPs, ten singles and sixteen music videos.

== Albums ==
=== Studio albums ===
Title	Album details	Peak chart positions			Certifications
Title	Album details	ITA	LTU	SWI	Certifications
Bestiario musicale	Release date: 27 January 2017; Label: Picicca Dischi; Formats: LP, digital download, streaming	10	—	—	
Cosa faremo da grandi?	Release date: 17 January 2020; Label: Sugar Music; Formats: LP, CD, digital download, streaming	23	—	—	
La gente che sogna	Release date: 21 April 2023; Label: Sugar Music; Formats: LP, CD, digital download, streaming	37	—	—	
Volevo essere un duro	Release date: 21 March 2025; Label: Sugar Music; Formats: LP, CD, digital download, streaming	1	9	27	FIMI: Platinum

=== Live albums ===
List of albums, with selected details
Title	Details	Peak chart positions
Title	Details	ITA
La chitarra nella roccia	Released: 14 November 2025; Label: Sugar Music; Formats: LP, CD, digital download, streaming	4

=== Compilation albums ===
List of albums, with selected details
Title	Details
Altalena Boy/Vetulonia Dakar	Released: 16 January 2015; Label: Picicca Dischi; Formats: CD, digital download, streaming

== Extended plays ==
Title	EP details
Vetulonia Dakar	Release date: 29 April 2014; Label: Picicca Dischi; Formats: CD, digital download, streaming
Altalena Boy (Note: The EP also includes a re-issued version of Vetulonia Dakar.)	Release date: 16 January 2015; Label: Picicca Dischi; Formats: CD, digital download, streaming

== Singles ==
Title	Year	Peak chart positions									Certifications	Album
Title	Year	ITA	AUT	FIN	GER	LTU	NLD	NOR	SWE	SWI	Certifications	Album
"Cosa faremo da grandi?"	2019	60	—	—	—	—	—	—	—	—		Cosa faremo da grandi?
"Freccia Bianca"	2020	—	—	—	—	—	—	—	—	—		Cosa faremo da grandi?
"Trieste"	2020	85	—	—	—	—	—	—	—	—		Cosa faremo da grandi?
"Astronave giradisco/La bocca della verità"	2023	—	—	—	—	—	—	—	—	—		La gente che sogna
"Magia nera/Orme"	2023	—	—	—	—	—	—	—	—	—		La gente che sogna
"Radio Mayday"	2023	—	—	—	—	—	—	—	—	—		La gente che sogna
"Tu sei il mattino"	2024	42	—	—	—	—	—	—	—	—		Volevo essere un duro
"Volevo essere un duro"	2025	3	17	43	85	3	78	61	30	11	FIMI: Platinum	Volevo essere un duro
"Situazione complicata"	2025	85	—	—	—	—	—	—	—	—		Volevo essere un duro
"Notte di Natale"	2025	—	—	—	—	—	—	—	—	—		Non-album singles
"Napoleone Buonanotte"	2026	—	—	—	—	—	—	—	—	—		Non-album singles
"—" denotes a single that did not chart or was not released.

== Other charted songs ==
Title	Year	Peak chart positions	Album
Title	Year	ITA	Album
"Sigarette"	2025	42	Volevo essere un duro
"Francis Delacroix"	2025	95	Volevo essere un duro

== Guest appearances ==
List of non-single guest appearances, with other performing artists, showing release year and album name
Title	Year	Album
"Il cuore va nell'organico" (Kahbum featuring Margherita Vicario and Lucio Corsi)	2016	Kahbum: Stagione 1
"Michel" (Francesco Bianconi featuring Lucio Corsi)	2022	Accade

== Music videos ==
Title	Release date	Director
Le api	17 April 2014	Lucio Corsi
Søren	21 May 2014	Lucio Corsi
Migrazione generale dalle campagne alle città	2 November 2014	Tommaso Ottomano
Godzilla	9 December 2014	Tommaso Ottomano
Altalena Boy (versione "tranquilla")	17 February 2015	Tommaso Ottomano
Altalena Boy (versione "sgravata")	17 February 2015	Tommaso Ottomano
Cosa faremo da grandi?	28 October 2019	Tommaso Ottomano
Freccia Bianca	17 January 2020	Tommaso Ottomano
Trieste	22 April 2020	Tommaso Ottomano
Astronave giradisco	22 March 2023	Tommaso Ottomano
La bocca della verità	3 April 2023	Tommaso Ottomano
Magia nera	18 April 2023	Tommaso Ottomano
Radio Mayday	21 April 2023	Tommaso Ottomano
Tu sei il mattino	15 November 2024	Tommaso Ottomano
Nel cuore della notte	24 December 2024	Tommaso Ottomano
Volevo essere un duro	12 February 2025	Tommaso Ottomano
