= La chitarra nella roccia =

Live album by Lucio Corsi
- Released: 14 November 2025
- Recorded: 30 June 2025
- Venue: Abbey of San Galgano
- Label: Sugar
- Producer: Tommaso Ottomano

Lucio Corsi chronology
| Volevo essere un duro (2025) | La chitarra nella roccia (2025) |

La chitarra nella roccia (lit. 'The guitar in the stone') is the first live album by Italian singer-songwriter Lucio Corsi. It was released on 14 November 2025 by Sugar Music.

The album was recorded at the Abbey of San Galgano during the special live concert on 30 July 2025. The 21-track collection spans the full arc of Corsi's artistic career, featuring his most recognized songs from all previous albums, including "Volevo essere un duro". The album also includes two additional pieces: "Canzone senza musica – Gli alberi", a spoken interlude regularly performed in his concerts, and "Maremma amara", a traditional folk song from the singer's homeland, Maremma.

A film of the concert, directed by Tommaso Ottomano, was also produced and released in cinemas on 3 November 2025. It was later made available on RaiPlay on 22 November.

== Track listing ==
La chitarra nella roccia track listing
| No. | Title | Length |
|---|---|---|
| 1. | "Freccia Bianca (Dal vivo all'Abbazia di San Galgano)" | 4:02 |
| 2. | "La bocca della verità (Dal vivo all'Abbazia di San Galgano)" | 3:45 |
| 3. | "Questa vita (Dal vivo all'Abbazia di San Galgano)" | 3:00 |
| 4. | "Amico vola via (Dal vivo all'Abbazia di San Galgano)" | 4:34 |
| 5. | "Trieste (Dal vivo all'Abbazia di San Galgano)" | 3:28 |
| 6. | "Sigarette (Dal vivo all'Abbazia di San Galgano)" | 3:13 |
| 7. | "Orme (Dal vivo all'Abbazia di San Galgano)" | 3:34 |
| 8. | "La ragazza trasparente (Dal vivo all'Abbazia di San Galgano)" | 2:52 |
| 9. | "La lepre (Dal vivo all'Abbazia di San Galgano)" | 3:05 |
| 10. | "Senza titolo (Dal vivo all'Abbazia di San Galgano)" | 2:57 |
| 11. | "Canzone senza musica – Gli alberi (Dal vivo all'Abbazia di San Galgano)" | 0:51 |
| 12. | "Maremma amara (Dal vivo all'Abbazia di San Galgano)" | 1:52 |
| 13. | "Volevo essere un duro (Dal vivo all'Abbazia di San Galgano)" | 4:51 |
| 14. | "Situazione complicata (Dal vivo all'Abbazia di San Galgano)" | 4:08 |
| 15. | "Tu sei il mattino (Dal vivo all'Abbazia di San Galgano)" | 3:39 |
| 16. | "Francis Delacroix (Dal vivo all'Abbazia di San Galgano)" | 5:34 |
| 17. | "Magia nera (Dal vivo all'Abbazia di San Galgano)" | 3:15 |
| 18. | "Nel cuore della notte (Dal vivo all'Abbazia di San Galgano)" | 7:00 |
| 19. | "Cosa faremo da grandi? (Dal vivo all'Abbazia di San Galgano)" | 3:28 |
| 20. | "Altalena Boy (Dal vivo all'Abbazia di San Galgano)" | 3:45 |
| 21. | "Il re del rave (Dal vivo all'Abbazia di San Galgano)" | 5:45 |

== Charts ==
Chart performance for La chitarra nella roccia
| Chart (2025) | Peak position |
|---|---|
| Italian Albums (FIMI) | 4 |
| Italian CDs and Vinyls (FIMI) | 3 |
