= Cosa faremo da grandi? =

Studio album by Lucio Corsi
- Released: 17 January 2020
- Length: 28:18
- Label: Sugar
- Producer: Francesco Bianconi; Antonio Cupertino

Lucio Corsi chronology
| Bestiario musicale (2017) | Cosa faremo da grandi? (2020) | La gente che sogna (2023) |

Singles from Cosa faremo da grandi?
- 1. "Cosa faremo da grandi?" Released: 25 October 2019; 2. "Freccia Bianca" Released: 9 January 2020; 3. "Trieste" Released: 1 May 2020

Cosa faremo da grandi? (lit. 'What will we do when we grow up?') is the second studio album by Italian singer-songwriter Lucio Corsi. It was released on 17 January 2020 by Sugar Music.

The album artwork, like all of Corsi's previous album covers, was created by the painter Nicoletta Rabiti, Corsi's mother.

== Composition ==
The album is produced by Francesco Bianconi and Antonio Cupertino, recorded and mixed in Milan at San Pedro Studio and mastered by Giovanni Versari at La Maestà Studio in Tredozio. It consists of nine tracks that combine acoustic and electric rock with more delicate sounds, thanks to the frequent use of strings, double bass, as well as marimba and mellotron.

Each song tells a story characterized by fairy-tale and surreal elements, which the singer himself describes as "true stories in the form of lies", and are narrated with influences from singer-songwriters such as Paolo Conte and Ivan Graziani, with a stylistic-musical approach reminiscent of 1970s British glam rock. The main themes of the album are lightness and travel, starting with the title track "Cosa faremo da grandi?", which narrates a "great enterprise that was self-sabotaged with peace of mind" in a world where "more emphasis is placed on departures than on milestones, where everything you have done can be dismantled to start anew toward other adventures".

In "L'orologio", the artist imagines being able to travel through time simply by wearing a wristwatch; in "Bigbuca", a child manages to dig a hole so deep that he can deceive gravity and find himself in China "with his legs towards the sky"; in "Freccia Bianca", the theme of travel is personified by the Frecciabianca train between Grosseto and Milan, imagined as the spirit of the Native American chief Freccia Bianca (White Arrow), galloping across the Italian peninsula. The evocative landscapes of Maremma, always present in his works, reappear both in the title track and in "Onde", a song inspired by observing the motion of the sea on the beach of Castiglione della Pescaia.

The wind is the protagonist of the track "Trieste", and also of "Amico vola via", the story of a boy from Lugano "who was too skinny, and with the wind, he would fly", and despite everyone inventing new ways to keep him grounded, "no one thought of building him wings". "Senza titolo" is instead "a Woody Guthrie-style talking blues, a flow of interwoven images", while "La ragazza trasparente" is a love song—the second ever written by the singer-songwriter after "Canzone per me" from Vetulonia Dakar—dedicated to a transparent girl precisely because she does not exist.

== Promotion ==
The album release was preceded by the publication of the singles "Cosa faremo da grandi?" on 25 October 2019, and "Freccia Bianca" on 9 January 2020. On 4 December 2019, Corsi announced the album's release on the television program L'assedio on Nove, hosted by Daria Bignardi, where he also performed the title track. The music videos for the singles, directed by Tommaso Ottomano, were published on the singer's YouTube channel and were conceived as part of a medium-length film that also includes some additional guitar riffs and a scene where the singer performs the folk song "Maremma amara" together with the ensemble Coro degli Etruschi. Both the film and the music video for the third single, "Trieste", again directed by Ottomano and released on 23 April, featured a collaboration with Gucci for the costumes.

The promotional tour for the album began on 15 February 2020, at the Cinema Lumière in Pisa, and initially planned for nine dates across major Italian cities, where the singer was accompanied by a live band composed of Filippo Scandroglio and Giulio Grillo, respectively guitarist and keyboardist of Quartiere Coffee, Michelangelo Scandroglio on bass, Iacopo Nieri on piano, and Marco Ronconi on drums, previously a member of the post-core band Blind Fool Love. However, the tour was interrupted after the date at the Parco della Musica in Rome due to the COVID-19 pandemic, and resumed starting from August 2020.

== Track listing ==
Cosa faremo da grandi? track listing
| No. | Title | Length |
|---|---|---|
| 1. | "Cosa faremo da grandi?" | 3:00 |
| 2. | "Freccia Bianca" | 3:19 |
| 3. | "L'orologio" | 2:02 |
| 4. | "Trieste" | 3:23 |
| 5. | "Onde" | 3:59 |
| 6. | "Senza titolo" | 2:56 |
| 7. | "Amico vola via" | 3:54 |
| 8. | "Bigbuca" | 3:15 |
| 9. | "La ragazza trasparente" | 2:30 |
| Total length: | | 28:18 |

== Personnel ==
- Lucio Corsi – lead vocals, guitars, piano, mellotron, organ
- Francesco Bianconi – mellotron, prophet, moog, back vocals
- Sebastiano De Gennaro – drums, percussion, vibraphone, marimba
- Alessandro Maiorino – bass guitar, double bass
- Marco Ronconi – percussion
- Tommaso Ottomano – electric guitar
- Antonio Cupertino – back vocals
- Daniele Richiedei and Alberto Martinelli – violins
- Laura Hernandez Garcia – viola
- Federico Bianchetti – cello

== Charts ==
Chart performance for Cosa faremo da grandi?
| Chart (2025) | Peak position |
|---|---|
| Italian Albums (FIMI) | 23 |

== Year-end lists ==
Selected year-end rankings of Cosa faremo da grandi?
| Publication | List | Rank | Ref. |
|---|---|---|---|
| Rolling Stone | The 20 Best Italian Albums of 2020 | 2 | |
