= Fantasma =

Fantasma may refer to:

== Books, film and TV ==
- El fantasma, a Spanish novel written by Wenceslao Fernández Flórez
- Fantasma, a 2006 Argentine film by Lisandro Alonso
- O Fantasma, a 2000 Portuguese gay-themed film
- Fantasmas (TV series), a 2024 American comedy television series

== Music ==
- El Fantasma (singer) (born 1989), Mexican singer-songwriter
- Grupo Fantasma (American band), a Texas band
- Fantasma (band), an Argentine cumbia duo
- Fantasma (South African band), led by Spoek Mathambo

=== Albums ===
- Fantasma (Cornelius album)
- Fantasma (Baustelle album)
- Fantasma, album by Burning Image
- El Fantasma, album by Los Yonic's
- Fantasmas (Willie Colón album)
- Fantasmas (Glorium album)
- Los Fantasmas, album by Menudo

=== Songs ===
- "Fantasma", song Puerto Rican singer Zion from The Perfect Melody
- "El Fantasma", Op. 37 No. 5 song by Joaquin Turina (1882-1949)
- "El fantasma", song by Vicentico from Los pájaros
- "El fantasma", song by Verónica Castro from Norteño in 1980

== Other uses ==
- El Hijo del Fantasma, or simply Fantasma, Mexican luchador
