= Trieste (song) =

Single by Lucio Corsi

from the album Cosa faremo da grandi?
- Language: Italian
- Released: 1 May 2020
- Length: 3:23
- Label: Sugar Music
- Composer: Lucio Corsi
- Lyricist: Lucio Corsi
- Producers: Francesco Bianconi; Antonio Cupertino

Lucio Corsi singles chronology
"Freccia Bianca" (2020)	"Trieste" (2020)	"Astronave giradisco/La bocca della verità" (2023)

Music video
- "Trieste" on YouTube

"Trieste" is a 2020 song by Italian singer-songwriter Lucio Corsi. It was written by Corsi, and produced by Francesco Bianconi and Antonio Cupertino. The song, released by Sugar Music, entered radio rotation on 1 May 2020, as the third single of the album Cosa faremo da grandi?.

== Composition ==
The song tells a story set in the city of Trieste, with the bora wind as its protagonist. Explaining the meaning of the track to Rolling Stone, Corsi stated:

"It's the story of the wind and how, one day in Trieste, people changed their minds about it—no longer seeing it as an obstacle but rather as a force pushing them forward. [...] For this song, I imagined the wind as a singer whom Italy only noticed—since he is invisible—after appearing on a TV show. This led to newfound appreciation, but also to his elimination from the show due to a lack of image, followed by a bittersweet ending where the wind returns alone to the square, whistling and ‘ruining the silence’. That, to me, is an incredible quality: after all, who else can whistle without lips, teeth, or a tongue?"

== Music video ==
The music video of "Trieste", directed by Tommaso Ottomano, premiered on 22 April 2020 on the Corriere della Sera website. It was released the following day on Corsi's YouTube channel.

== Charts ==
Chart performance for "Trieste"
Chart (2025)	Peak position
Italy (FIMI)	85
