= Rachele Bastreghi =

Italian singer-songwriter

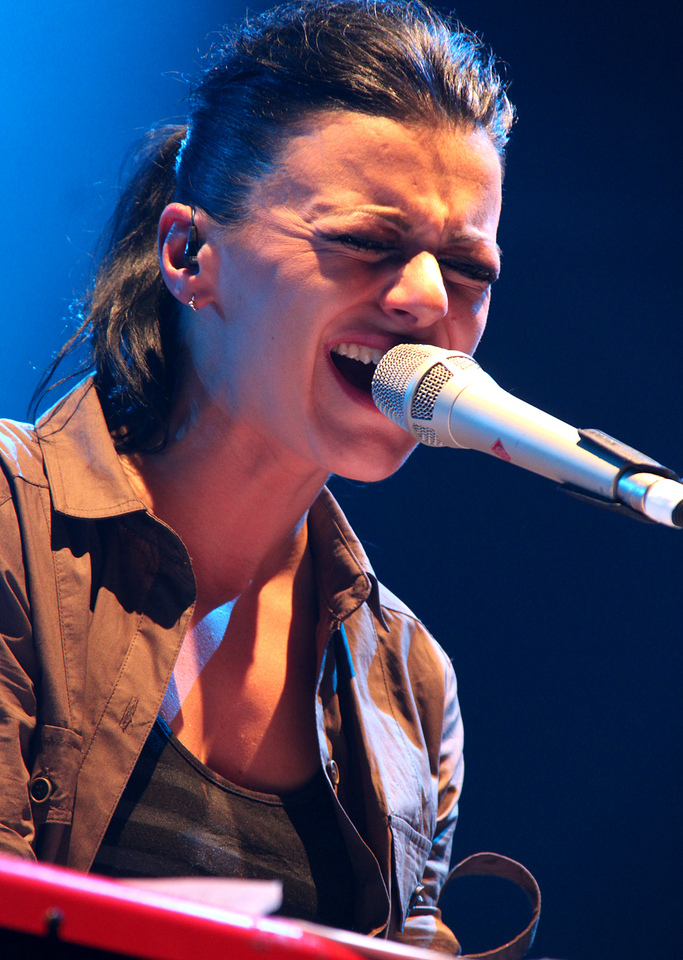
- Bastreghi in 2010

Background information
- Born: 15 July 1977 (age 47); Montepulciano, Tuscany, Italy
- Occupations: Singer; songwriter; keyboardist
- Years active: 1997–present
- Member of: Baustelle

Rachele Bastreghi (born 15 July 1977) is an Italian singer, songwriter, and musician, member of the indie rock band Baustelle.

== Life and career ==
Born in Montepulciano in 1977, daughter of theater director Mario Bastreghi, she joined the band Baustelle in the mid-1990s while still in high school, initially as a guitarist but soon focusing on vocals and keyboards. The band released their debut album, Sussidiario illustrato della giovinezza, in 2000.

In 2003, Bastreghi collaborated with Francesco Bianconi on the album La verità sul tennis by Virginiana Miller and worked with Perturbazione on the track "A luce spenta" from their 2005 album Canzoni allo specchio.

She performed live with La Crus during their farewell concerts in 2008 and collaborated with Le luci della centrale elettrica on the soundtrack for the film Rust in 2011. In 2014, she worked with Afterhours on a re-arrangement of "Mi trovo nuovo" for the reissue of their album Hai paura del buio?.

On 11 November 2014, Bastreghi appeared in the TV series Questo nostro amore 70 as Marie, performing her original song "Mon petit ami du passé", which was later released as a single in December 2014, and featured on her solo EP Marie, released by Warner on 27 January 2015.

On 30 April 2021, Bastreghi released her debut solo studio album, Psychodonna.

== Discography ==
=== Studio albums ===
Title	Album details	Peak chart positions
Title	Album details	ITA
Psychodonna	Release date: 30 April 2021; Label: Warner	49

=== EPs ===
Title	EP details	Peak chart positions
Title	EP details	ITA
Marie	Release date: 27 January 2015; Label: Warner	26

== Filmography ==
Television
Year	Title	Role	Notes
2014	Questo nostro amore 70	Marie	Episode 2x03

== Books ==
- Francesco Bianconi; Rachele Bastreghi; Claudio Brasini (2019). I musicisti arrivano già stanchi negli hotel. Fotodiario intimo di Baustelle in movimento. La nave di Teseo.
