= Tommaso Ottomano =

Italian record producer, musician and filmmaker (born 1990)

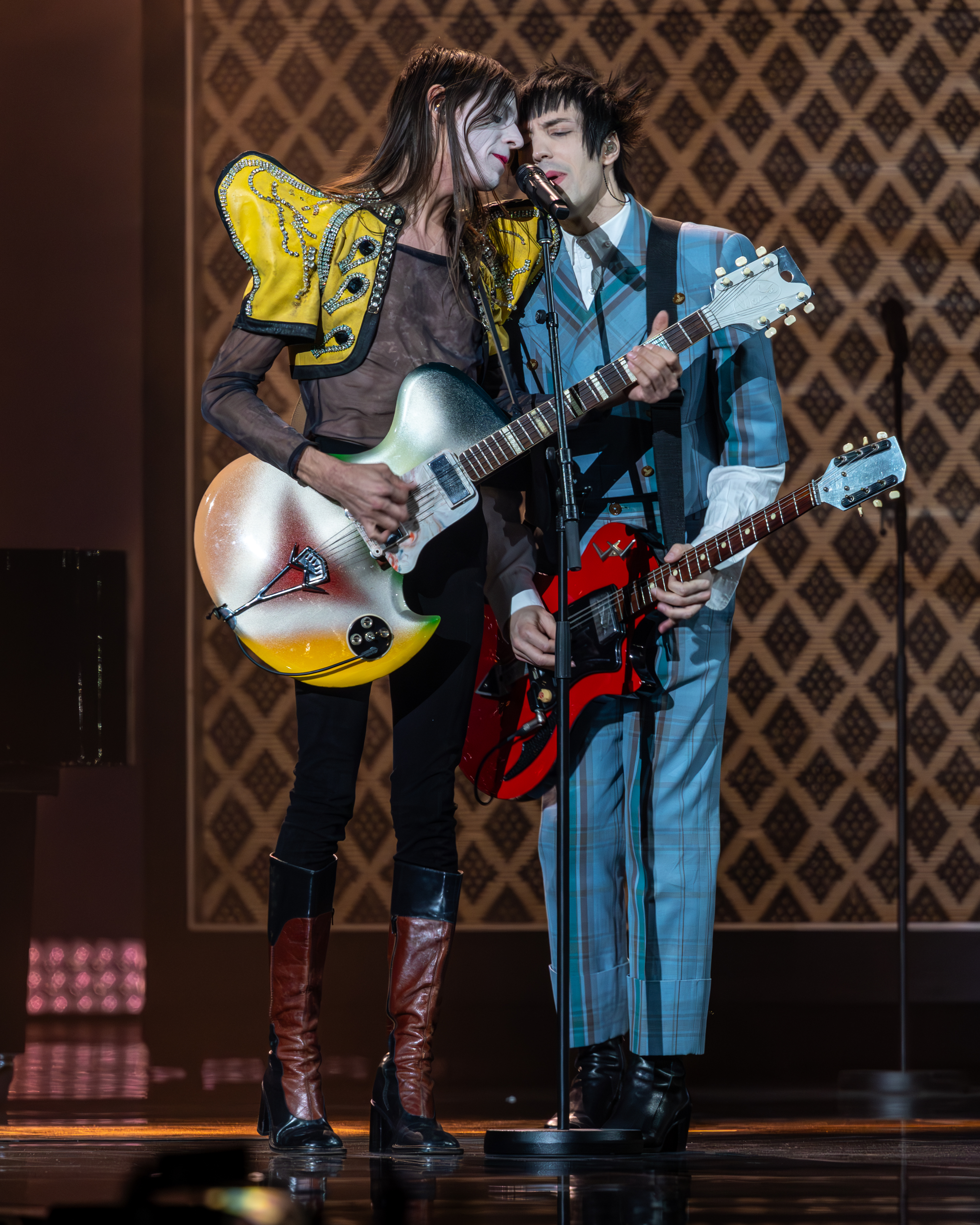
- Ottomano performing with Lucio Corsi at Eurovision 2025

Background information
- Born: Tommaso Sabatini; 6 August 1990 (age 36); Orbetello, Tuscany, Italy
- Origin: Porto Ercole, Tuscany, Italy
- Occupations: Record producer; songwriter; musician; singer; filmmaker
- Years active: 2007–present

Tommaso Sabatini (born 6 August 1990), known professionally as Tommaso Ottomano, is an Italian record producer, songwriter, musician, singer, and filmmaker, best known for his frequent collaborations with Lucio Corsi and Chiello, and for his work as a music video director for various artists, including Måneskin. He co-wrote and produced Corsi's song "Volevo essere un duro", which placed second at Sanremo Music Festival 2025 and represented Italy at the Eurovision Song Contest, where he also performed as guitarist and back vocalist.

== Early life and education ==
Born in 1990, Sabatini grew up in Porto Ercole, a small fishing village on Monte Argentario in the province of Grosseto, Tuscany. His father is a carpenter, and his mother owns a clothing store. From an early age, he developed a passion for music—studying singing and guitar—as well as cinema, also experimenting with photography before creating his first videos.

He began high school at the technical institute for surveyors in Grosseto but switched to the vocational school for tourism after one year.

== Career ==
=== Blind Fool Love ===
In 2007, Sabatini founded the band Blind Fool Love, serving as lead vocalist and guitarist under the name Scary, alongside Piero Cini on bass and Marco Ronconi on drums. Initially producing songs in English and covers, they later shifted to writing original Italian lyrics, blending influences from Italian singer-songwriters with a post-hardcore and emo style. Their first official single, "Vampiro", was released in November 2009.

In 2011, the band signed with Sony Music and released their debut EP Il pianto, which peaked at 5 of the FIMI Albums Chart. Their studio album La strage di Cupido was released on 27 September 2011. In November, the music video for "Com'eri un tempo", directed by Sabatini himself, was released. They disbanded at the end of 2012 when Sabatini moved to Milan to start his career in videomaking.

=== As a filmmaker and music producer ===
In Milan, Sabatini adopted the name Tommaso Ottomano and connected with fellow Tuscan Lucio Corsi, who also had moved to the city to pursue his music career. Ottomano directed Corsi's music videos "Godzilla" (2014) and "Altalena Boy" (2015), starting a collaboration that led him to create all of Corsi's subsequent videos. He also contributed as a musician to Corsi's debut album, Bestiario musicale.

In 2017, Ottomano sent to Francesco Bianconi a short music video for the "Intro" of Baustelle's album L'amore e la violenza. Bianconi appreciated the work and had it released in March of that year. As a result, Ottomano was also commissioned to direct the music video for the track "Il Vangelo di Giovanni", released on 28 April 2017.

In 2021, Ottomano began collaborating with rapper and singer Chiello as both a songwriter and director. That same year, he directed the music video for Jovanotti's single "La primavera". Between 2022 and 2023, he worked with Måneskin, directing the music videos for the singles "The Loneliest", "Gossip", and "Honey (Are U Coming?)". Ottomano was awarded Director of the Year at the 2022 Videoclip Italia Awards, and won Best Rock Video for "The Loneliest" at the 2023 edition. That same year, the video won Best Rock Video at the MTV Video Music Awards. In 2024, Ottomano was once again named Director of the Year at the Videoclip Italia Music Awards, and won Best Rock Video for Måneskin's "Gossip". During this period, he also directed commercials and fashion campaign videos for brands such as Prada, Gucci, Missoni and Roberto Cavalli.

As a producer and songwriter, Ottomano worked on Lucio Corsi's albums La gente che sogna (2023) and Volevo essere un duro (2025). He co-wrote and produced the latter's title track, which competed at the Sanremo Music Festival 2025, where he accompanied Corsi on guitar and back vocals on the Ariston stage. The song finished in second place, receiving the Critics' Award, and was later selected as Italy's entry for the Eurovision Song Contest. He once again backed Corsi at Eurovision in May, performing "Volevo essere un duro" and ranking at fifth place in the final. On 30 July 2025, he took part in Corsi's concert at the Abbey of San Galgano, overseeing its production and also directing the concert film, which was released in Italian cinemas on 3 November.

In 2026, Ottomano returned to the Sanremo Music Festival as the songwriter and producer of "Ti penso sempre", the song performed in competition by Chiello. He produced Mangiami pure, the debut album by Roshelle, which was released on 27 March 2026.

=== Topo Nero Rock ===
In October 2026, Ottomano announced his solo singer-songwriter project, Topo Nero Rock, through a letter published on social media. The project takes its name from an alter ego he conceived in 2007 and combines 1990s rock influences with the style of 1960s Italian pop music. On 6 November 2026, he released through Sugar the debut single, "Cerco una ragazza, disperatamente".

== Selected filmography ==
=== Film ===
Year	Title	Notes
2021	Paura: La vergine nella fontana	Short film; also writer
2022	Paura: La notte di Evelyn	Short film; also writer
2025	La chitarra nella roccia	Live concert

=== Music videos ===
Title	Artist(s)	Release date
Com'eri un tempo	Blind Fool Love	11 November 2011
Migrazione generale dalle campagne alle città	Lucio Corsi	2 November 2014
Godzilla	Lucio Corsi	9 December 2014
Altalena Boy (versione "tranquilla")	Lucio Corsi	17 February 2015
Altalena Boy (versione "sgravata")	Lucio Corsi	17 February 2015
Grande raccordo animale	Appino	7 May 2015
Love	Baustelle	24 March 2017
Il Vangelo di Giovanni	Baustelle	28 April 2017
Botox	Myss Keta	13 April 2018
Cosa faremo da grandi?	Lucio Corsi	28 October 2019
Freccia Bianca	Lucio Corsi	17 January 2020
Puta	Joan Thiele	23 January 2020
Trieste	Lucio Corsi	22 April 2020
Club	Ginevra	22 June 2021
Quanto ti vorrei	Chiello	24 September 2021
Damerino	Chiello and Taxi B	15 October 2021
Sul fondo dello scrigno	Chiello	15 October 2021
Golfo paradiso	Chiello and Mace	15 October 2021
La primavera	Jovanotti	17 December 2021
Dove vai?	Chiello	24 June 2022
The Loneliest	Måneskin	12 October 2022
Gossip	Måneskin featuring Tom Morello	13 January 2023
Milano dannata	Chiello	17 March 2023
Astronave giradisco	Lucio Corsi	22 March 2023
La bocca della verità	Lucio Corsi	3 April 2023
Magia nera	Lucio Corsi	18 April 2023
Radio Mayday	Lucio Corsi	21 April 2023
Honey (Are U Coming?)	Måneskin	5 September 2023
Limone	Chiello	26 April 2024
Stanza 107	Chiello	17 July 2024
Chiudi gli occhi	Marianne Mirage	21 October 2024
Ho sbagliato ancora	Chiello	4 November 2024
Tu sei il mattino	Lucio Corsi	15 November 2024
Nel cuore della notte	Lucio Corsi	24 December 2024
Amore mio	Chiello	29 January 2025
Volevo essere un duro	Lucio Corsi	12 February 2025
Pirati	Chiello	28 March 2025
Lupo	Chiello	5 December 2025
L’origine del mondo	Roshelle	6 February 2026
Ti penso sempre	Chiello	25 February 2026
Sola tra le nuvole	Roshelle	10 March 2026

== Selected songwriting discography ==
Song title, year of release, original artist, and album of release
Song	Year	Artist(s)	Album	Ref.
"Dove vai"	2022	Chiello	Non-album single	
"Cuore tra le stelle"	2022	Chiello	Non-album single	
"Astronave giradisco"	2023	Lucio Corsi	La gente che sogna	
"La bocca della verità"	2023	Lucio Corsi	La gente che sogna	
"Magia nera"	2023	Lucio Corsi	La gente che sogna	
"Orme"	2023	Lucio Corsi	La gente che sogna	
"Radio Mayday"	2023	Lucio Corsi	La gente che sogna	
"La gente che sogna"	2023	Lucio Corsi	La gente che sogna	
"Glam Party"	2023	Lucio Corsi	La gente che sogna	
"Danza classica"	2023	Lucio Corsi	La gente che sogna	
"Un altro mondo"	2023	Lucio Corsi	La gente che sogna	
"Tutti quanti dormono"	2023	Chiello	Mela marcia	
"Glugluglu"	2023	Chiello	Mela marcia	
"Tutti i miei idoli sono morti"	2023	Chiello	Mela marcia	
"Limone"	2024	Chiello	Scarabocchi	
"Stanza 107"	2024	Chiello	Scarabocchi	
"Tu sei il mattino"	2024	Lucio Corsi	Volevo essere un duro	
"Amore mio"	2025	Chiello	Scarabocchi	
"Volevo essere un duro"	2025	Lucio Corsi	Volevo essere un duro	
"Sigarette"	2025	Lucio Corsi	Volevo essere un duro	
"Francis Delacroix"	2025	Lucio Corsi	Volevo essere un duro	
"Let There Be Rocko"	2025	Lucio Corsi	Volevo essere un duro	
"Il re del rave"	2025	Lucio Corsi	Volevo essere un duro	
"Situazione complicata"	2025	Lucio Corsi	Volevo essere un duro	
"Questa vita"	2025	Lucio Corsi	Volevo essere un duro	
"Nel cuore della notte"	2025	Lucio Corsi	Volevo essere un duro	
"Insetti"	2025	Chiello	Scarabocchi	
"Scintille"	2025	Chiello	Scarabocchi	
"Stupida anima"	2025	Chiello	Scarabocchi	
"I miei occhi erano tuoi"	2025	Chiello and Rose Villain	Scarabocchi	
"Maledirò"	2025	Chiello	Scarabocchi	
"Nessuno ti crede"	2025	Chiello	Scarabocchi	
"Notte di Natale"	2025	Lucio Corsi	Non-album single	
"L'origine del mondo"	2026	Roshelle	Mangiami pure	
"Musa"	2026	Roshelle	Mangiami pure	
"Ti penso sempre"	2026	Chiello	Agonia	
"Sola tra le nuvole"	2026	Roshelle	Mangiami pure	
"A testa alta"	2026	Chiello	Agonia	
"Vulcano"	2026	Chiello	Agonia	
"Salvami da me stesso"	2026	Chiello	Agonia	
"Polynesian Village"	2026	Chiello	Agonia	
"Desaturarsi"	2026	Chiello	Agonia	
"Gli spettri e le paure"	2026	Chiello	Agonia	
"Spero almeno"	2026	Chiello	Agonia	
"Scarletta"	2026	Chiello	Agonia	
"Sto andando via"	2026	Chiello	Agonia	
"Limbo"	2026	Roshelle	Mangiami pure	
"Sott'acqua"	2026	Roshelle	Mangiami pure	
"Una notte triste triste"	2026	Roshelle	Mangiami pure	
"Cigarette"	2026	Roshelle	Mangiami pure	
"Due passi nel blu della luna (meno vocale)"	2026	Roshelle	Mangiami pure	
"Veleno"	2026	Roshelle	Mangiami pure	

== Awards and nominations ==
Year	Ceremony	Award	Result	Ref.
2022	Videoclip Italia Awards	Director of the Year	Won	
2024	Videoclip Italia Awards	Director of the Year	Won	
