= La gente che sogna =

Studio album by Lucio Corsi
- Released: 21 April 2023
- Length: 27:47
- Label: Sugar
- Producer: Tommaso Ottomano

Lucio Corsi chronology
| Cosa faremo da grandi? (2020) | La gente che sogna (2023) | Volevo essere un duro (2025) |

Singles from La gente che sogna
- 1. "Astronave giradisco/La bocca della verità" Released: 17 March 2023; 2. "Magia nera/Orme" Released: 14 April 2023; 3. "Radio Mayday" Released: 28 April 2023

La gente che sogna (lit. 'The people who dream') is the third studio album by Italian singer-songwriter Lucio Corsi. It was released on 21 April 2023 by Sugar Music.

The album cover, like the previous ones, was created by the painter Nicoletta Rabiti, Corsi's mother.

== Track listing ==
La gente che sogna track listing
| No. | Title | Length |
|---|---|---|
| 1. | "Radio Mayday" | 3:36 |
| 2. | "Astronave giradisco" | 3:02 |
| 3. | "Magia nera" | 2:30 |
| 4. | "La gente che sogna" | 3:04 |
| 5. | "Orme" | 3:12 |
| 6. | "La bocca della verità" | 3:45 |
| 7. | "Glam Party" | 2:21 |
| 8. | "Danza classica" | 3:32 |
| 9. | "Un altro mondo" | 2:45 |
| Total length: | | 27:47 |

== Charts ==
Chart performance for La gente che sogna
| Chart (2023–2025) | Peak position |
|---|---|
| Italian Albums (FIMI) | 37 |

== Year-end lists ==
Selected year-end rankings of La gente che sogna
| Publication | List | Rank | Ref. |
|---|---|---|---|
| Rolling Stone | The 30 Best Italian Albums of 2023 | 11 | |
