= Ti penso sempre =

2026 song by Chiello

Single by Chiello

from the album Agonia
- Released: 25 February 2026
- Length: 2:34
- Label: Island
- Composers: Tommaso Ottomano; Saverio Cigarini; Fausto Cigarini; Matteo Pigoni
- Lyricists: Chiello; Tommaso Ottomano
- Producer: Tommaso Ottomano

Chiello singles chronology
| "Lupo" (2025) | "Ti penso sempre" (2026) |

"Ti penso sempre" ("I Always Think of You") is a song written and recorded by Italian singer-songwriter Chiello, and composed by Tommaso Ottomano, Saverio Cigarini, Fausto Cigarini, and Matteo Pigoni. It was released on 25 February 2026 as the lead single from his fourth studio album, Agonia.

The song competed in the Sanremo Music Festival 2026, placing 25th.

== Music video ==
The music video, directed by Tommaso Ottomano, was released simultaneously with the single through the singer's official YouTube channel.

== Charts ==
Chart performance for "Ti penso sempre"
| Chart (2026) | Peak position |
|---|---|
| Italy (FIMI) | 19 |
| Italy Airplay (EarOne) | 58 |
