= Situazione complicata =

Single by Lucio Corsi

from the album Volevo essere un duro
- Language: Italian
- Released: 6 June 2025
- Length: 3:25
- Label: Sugar Music
- Composers: Lucio Corsi; Tommaso Ottomano
- Lyricists: Lucio Corsi; Tommaso Ottomano
- Producers: Lucio Corsi; Tommaso Ottomano; Antonio Cupertino

Lucio Corsi singles chronology
| "Volevo essere un duro" (2025) | "Situazione complicata" (2025) | "Notte di Natale" (2025) |

"Situazione complicata" ("Complicated situation") is a 2025 song by Italian singer-songwriter Lucio Corsi. It was written by Corsi together with Tommaso Ottomano, and produced by both with the collaboration of Antonio Cupertino. The song, released on 21 March 2025 by Sugar Music as the seventh track of Volevo essere un duro, entered the radio rotation on 6 June 2025, as the third single from the album.

== Composition ==
The song, written by Corsi with Tommaso Ottomano, tells a story of an impossible and complicated love. The protagonist is in love with Giulia, a friend, but also the wife of his friend, making the situation extremely problematic and tragicomic. The narrative highlights the singer's humorous and confused character, who finds himself dreaming, planning failures, and pretending to be indifferent.

Corsi commented on the song: "The narrative voice is that of a ridiculous man, ridiculous because he has a tangled heart. He dreams and suffers, studies failed plans, escapes perfectly, returns, and pretends".

== Live performances ==
Corsi performed the song live in an acoustic version during the Rai 2 program Stasera c'è Cattelan su Rai 2 on 23 March 2025.

On 4 May 2025, a live performance of the song was published on the Eurovision Song Contest official YouTube channel for the series A Little Bit More. Corsi performed the song at the Radio Italia Live Concert in Piazza del Duomo, in Milan, on 30 May.

== Charts ==
Chart performance for "Situazione complicata"
| Chart (2025) | Peak position |
|---|---|
| Italy (FIMI) | 85 |
| Italy Airplay (EarOne) | 26 |
