= Volevo essere un duro =

2025 song by Lucio Corsi

Single by Lucio Corsi

from the album Volevo essere un duro
- Language: Italian
- Released: 12 February 2025
- Genre: Rock; glam rock
- Length: 3:05
- Label: Sugar Music
- Composers: Lucio Corsi; Tommaso Ottomano
- Lyricist: Lucio Corsi
- Producers: Lucio Corsi; Tommaso Ottomano; Antonio Cupertino

Lucio Corsi singles chronology
"Tu sei il mattino" (2024)	"Volevo essere un duro" (2025)	"Situazione complicata" (2025)

Music video
- "Volevo essere un duro" on YouTube

Eurovision Song Contest 2025 entry
- Country: Italy
- Artist: Lucio Corsi
- Language: Italian
- Composers: Lucio Corsi; Tommaso Ottomano
- Lyricist: Lucio Corsi

Finals performance
- Final result: 5th
- Final points: 256

Entry chronology
- ◄ "La noia" (2024)
- "Per sempre sì" (2026) ►

"Volevo essere un duro" (Italian pronunciation: [voˈleːvo ˈɛssere un ˈduːro]; transl. "I wanted to be a tough guy") is a 2025 song by Italian singer-songwriter Lucio Corsi. The track was co-written by Corsi and Tommaso Ottomano, and produced by Corsi, Ottomano, and Antonio Cupertino. It was released by Sugar Music on 12 February 2025, as the second single from his album Volevo essere un duro.

The song competed in the Sanremo Music Festival 2025, finishing in second place and being awarded the Mia Martini Critics Prize. It was later chosen as the Italian entry for the Eurovision Song Contest 2025, placing fifth. It won the Targa Tenco for best song of the year.

== Composition ==
The song, written by Corsi himself with Tommaso Ottomano, who co-produced it with Antonio Cupertino, unfolds as a reflection on personal and societal expectations regarding self-image versus bullying when he was a child. In an interview given on the occasion of the Sanremo 2025 Festival, Corsi described the meaning of his song, stating:

"It talks about the idea that this world would like us to be infallible, solid as stones and perfect as flowers, without telling us that flowers hang by a thread. And then also about the fact that, often, it is also easy not to become what one dreamed of. Very few people can say that they have become what they dreamed of as children or what the world would have us be. Then, maybe sometimes it is not even the right path. We happen to dream of things that, in the end, are not so much better than what we are. If my song were an image, it would be one of those trees you climb as a child, or a slingshot."

The string orchestra accompaniment was arranged by Davide Rossi, who also served as the conductor during the performance at Sanremo.

== Critical reception ==
"Volevo essere un duro" received favorable reviews from Italian music critics.

Andrea Laffranchi of Corriere della Sera wrote that the song has the "delicacy of Ivan Graziani and the panache of glam rock", associating the lyrical narrative with a fairy tale. Gianni Sibilla of Rockol stated that the song "in essence is another ballad, but with an arrangement that between strings and guitars has a 70s flavor almost Elton John music style" whose lyrics "play with the stereotypes of machismo".

Alvise Salerno of All Music Italia wrote that although the song does not fully represent Corsi's songwriting career, it opens up to the general public thanks to its "melodic simplicity and vocal as well as textual immediacy". Filippo Ferrari of Rolling Stone Italia reported that the song is among the best productions of the singer-songwriter's career, finding the lyrics "full of images that make one think about life and what a mess it is to become an adult".

== Music video ==
The music video of "Volevo essere un duro", directed by Tommaso Ottomano, was released on 12 February 2025 via Corsi's YouTube channel. The video features actors Massimo Ceccherini, Leonardo Pieraccioni, Laura Locatelli, Alvise Cimarosti, and Mariia Zhizhkun. It contains numerous references to other works including the music videos of "Black or White" by Michael Jackson and "Walk This Way" by Aerosmith with Run DMC and the films The Exorcist, Back to the Future and Tenacious D in The Pick of Destiny from which the initial scene linked to the song "Kickapoo" by the group of the same name resumes.

== Charts ==
=== Weekly charts ===
Weekly chart performance for "Volevo essere un duro"
Chart (2025)	Peak position
Austria (Ö3 Austria Top 40)	17
Croatia International Airplay (Top lista)	87
Finland (Suomen virallinen lista)	43
Germany (GfK)	85
Greece International (IFPI)	20
Iceland (Tónlistinn)	16
Italy (FIMI)	3
Italy Airplay (EarOne)	6
Latvia (LaIPA)	10
Lithuania (AGATA)	3
Netherlands (Single Top 100)	78
Norway (VG-lista)	61
Portugal (AFP)	119
Sweden (Sverigetopplistan)	30
Switzerland (Schweizer Hitparade)	11
UK Singles Downloads (Official Charts)	49
UK Singles Sales (OCC)	47

=== Year-end charts ===
Year-end chart performance for "Volevo essere un duro"
Chart (2025)	Position
Italy (FIMI)	19

== Certifications ==
Certifications for "Volevo essere un duro"
Region	Certification	Certified units/sales
Italy (FIMI)	Platinum	200,000^{‡}
^{‡} Sales+streaming figures based on certification alone.
