= Volevo essere un duro (album) =

Studio album by Lucio Corsi
- Released: 21 March 2025
- Length: 31:14
- Label: Sugar
- Producer: Lucio Corsi; Tommaso Ottomano; Antonio Cupertino

Lucio Corsi chronology
La gente che sogna (2023)	Volevo essere un duro (2025)	La chitarra nella roccia (2025)

Singles from Volevo essere un duro
- 1. "Tu sei il mattino" Released: 12 November 2024; 2. "Volevo essere un duro" Released: 12 February 2025; 3. "Situazione complicata" Released: 6 June 2025

Volevo essere un duro (lit. 'I wanted to be a tough guy') is the fourth studio album by Italian singer-songwriter Lucio Corsi. It was released on 21 March 2025 by Sugar Music. It won the Targa Tenco for best album of the year.

The album features the title track, with which Corsi competed at the Sanremo Music Festival 2025, finishing in second place and being awarded with the "Mia Martini" Critics' Prize. That song was then selected to represent Italy in the Eurovision Song Contest 2025.

== Background and composition ==
The album Volevo essere un duro was announced on 12 February 2025 during Corsi's participation in the Sanremo Music Festival, where he placed second in the general ranking, behind Olly's "Balorda nostalgia". Corsi was chosen as the Italian entry for the Eurovision Song Contest 2025, after Olly declined the opportunity to represent the country in the contest.

The album consists of nine tracks written and composed by Corsi himself with Tommaso Ottomano and the producer Antonio Cupertino, aka Cuper. In an interview released to Rockol, Corsi explained the album's meaning:

"Many of the stories on the album relate to the past, to adolescence; they are stories lived by me, or by friends, or by others, or by people I have invented. Reinventing the past is something magical. The future is surprising; the past, in theory, is not because we have already lived it. That's why, if we reinterpret it, it can surprise just like tomorrow; it can have the same effect and allows us to create another personal story. [...] I am very fond of songs with protagonists who are unique characters. Their stories, in fact, may be small, but they contain an epic that deserves to be told and that is sometimes more interesting than those of great events".

== Promotion ==
=== Singles ===
The first single, "Tu sei il mattino", was released on 12 November 2024. On 12 February 2025, Corsi released the second single "Volevo essere un duro", which competed in the Sanremo Music Festival 2025. Although not released as singles, Corsi uploaded the song "Nel cuore della notte" on YouTube on 2024 Christmas' eve, and during the promotion of his Sanremo entry, he performed the track "Francis Delacroix" on several occasions.

On 6 June 2025, "Situazione complicata" entered radio rotation as the third single from the album.

=== Tour ===
To promote his album, Corsi will embark on a tour featuring performances at various music festivals, as well as in Italian racetracks and clubs. The tour includes the Lucio Corsi Tour 2025, scheduled from 10 April to 4 May, and the Lucio Corsi Estate 2025, running from 12 June to 31 August. Additionally, he will perform at Rome's Capannelle Racecourse on 21 June and at Milan's Hippodrome of San Siro on 7 September 2025.

== Critical reception ==
Giuliano Delli Paoli from Ondarock stated that the singer-songwriter has used "expressive freedom, disregarding the potential censure of purists", finding it to be Corsi's most successful project, as well as "one of the great moments of Italian singer-songwriter music" of the 21st century.

Claudio Todesco from Rolling Stone Italia wrote that the project aims to "try to paint musical portraits without giving up the dimension of dreams", temporally anchored "in childhood and adolescence, and thus in memories and perhaps also in the passage of time that needs to be exorcised". Additionally, he noted that compared to Corsi's previous project, the album features "a stripped-down sound" to emphasize the lyrics, sung with a "tender, spontaneous, and light" tone.

== Track listing ==
Volevo essere un duro track listing
No.	Title	Length
1.	"Tu sei il mattino"	3:08
2.	"Sigarette"	2:59
3.	"Volevo essere un duro"	3:05
4.	"Francis Delacroix"	3:13
5.	"Let There Be Rocko"	2:32
6.	"Il re del rave"	3:26
7.	"Situazione complicata"	3:25
8.	"Questa vita"	2:52
9.	"Nel cuore della notte"	6:34
Total length:		31:14

== Charts ==
=== Weekly charts ===
Chart performance for Volevo essere un duro
Chart (2025)	Peak position
Italian Albums (FIMI)	1
Lithuanian Albums (AGATA)	9
Swiss Albums (Schweizer Hitparade)	27

=== Year-end charts ===
Year-end chart performance for Volevo essere un duro
Chart (2025)	Position
Italian Albums (FIMI)	40

== Certifications ==
Certifications for Volevo essere un duro
Region	Certification	Certified units/sales
Italy (FIMI)	Platinum	50,000^{‡}
^{‡} Sales+streaming figures based on certification alone.
