= Tu sei il mattino =

Single by Lucio Corsi

from the album Volevo essere un duro
- Language: Italian
- Released: 12 November 2024
- Length: 3:08
- Label: Sugar Music
- Composers: Lucio Corsi; Tommaso Ottomano
- Lyricist: Lucio Corsi
- Producers: Tommaso Ottomano; Antonio Cupertino

Lucio Corsi singles chronology
"Radio Mayday" (2023)	"Tu sei il mattino" (2024)	"Volevo essere un duro" (2025)

Music video
- "Tu sei il mattino" on YouTube

"Tu sei il mattino" (lit. 'You are the morning') is a 2024 song by Italian singer-songwriter Lucio Corsi. It was written by Corsi and Tommaso Ottomano, and produced by Ottomano and Antonio Cupertino. It was released by Sugar Music on 12 November 2024 as the first single from the album Volevo essere un duro.

The song was also part of the soundtrack for the third season of Vita da Carlo, the television series by Carlo Verdone.

== Music video ==
The music video of "Tu sei il mattino", directed by Tommaso Ottomano, was released on 15 November 2024 via Corsi's YouTube channel. It portrays the artist dealing with a cold inside an elevator and features actor Carlo Verdone. Other cast members include Ann Louise Amendolagine, Paula Cardoso, Modestino Capaccio, Francis Delacroix, Angelica Elli, and Adam Kay Nixon.

== Charts ==
Chart performance for "Tu sei il mattino"
Chart (2025)	Peak position
Italy (FIMI)	42
Italy Airplay (EarOne)	77
