= Cosa faremo da grandi? (song) =

Single by Lucio Corsi

from the album Cosa faremo da grandi?
- Language: Italian
- Released: 25 October 2019
- Length: 3:00
- Label: Sugar Music
- Composer: Lucio Corsi
- Lyricist: Lucio Corsi
- Producers: Francesco Bianconi; Antonio Cupertino

Lucio Corsi singles chronology
"Cosa faremo da grandi?" (2019)	"Freccia Bianca" (2020)

Music video
- "Cosa faremo da grandi?" on YouTube

"Cosa faremo da grandi?" (lit. 'What will we do when we grow up?') is a 2019 song by Italian singer-songwriter Lucio Corsi. It was written by Corsi, and produced by Francesco Bianconi and Antonio Cupertino. The song was released by Sugar Music on 25 October 2019 as the lead single of the album of the same name.

== Composition ==
The song was created, according to the artist, during the previous winter on the beach of Castiglione della Pescaia while he was observing the sand with a friend. "Cosa faremo da grandi?" tells the story of "great endeavors that go up in smoke with a peaceful heart, like someone who spends a lifetime building seashells only to throw them into the sea and start over. It reflects on a different way of living, where it's not achievements that are celebrated, but the starting lines".

== Promotion and release ==
The song was premiered on 24 October 2019, at the UniCredit Tower in Milan, as part of the Niente di strano format hosted by Carlo Pastore. On 4 December 2019, Corsi performed the song on the TV program L'assedio on Nove, hosted by Daria Bignardi, where he announced the release of his new album. The single entered radio rotation on 10 January 2020.

== Music video ==
The music video of "Cosa faremo da grandi?", directed by Tommaso Ottomano, was released on 28 October 2019 via Corsi's YouTube channel. Filmed in Porto Ercole, the video follows a group of fishermen who find a mysterious guitar in their nets with the word "Surprise" written on it—a reference to the boat with which Ambrogio Fogar sailed around the world. The video also pays tribute to Fogar by featuring his book 400 giorni intorno al mondo. Corsi's costumes, designed by Gucci, are inspired by the glam rock style of the 1970s.

== Charts ==
Chart performance for "Cosa faremo da grandi?"
Chart (2025)	Peak position
Italy (FIMI)	60
