= Blind Fool Love =

Italian post-hardcore band

- Origin: Grosseto, Italy
- Genres: Post-hardcore, alternative rock, emo
- Years active: 2007–2012
- Label: Sony Music
- Members: Tommaso Sabatini; Piero Cini; Marco Ronconi

Blind Fool Love were an Italian post-hardcore band founded in Grosseto in 2007. In 2011, they released their debut EP Il pianto. The first studio album, La strage di Cupido, was released on 27 September 2011. The band split in 2012.

== Career ==
The band was formed in Grosseto from an idea by Tommaso Sabatini, known as "Scary" (vocals and guitar), and Piero Cini (bass) during their high school years. Although the band's origins date back to 2005, it was officially formed in 2007 with the arrival of Marco Ronconi on drums and the release of their first songs. The name "Blind Fool Love" is taken from William Shakespeare's Sonnet 137. After initially producing songs in English and performing covers, the band began writing original songs in Italian, drawing inspiration from the tradition of Italian singer-songwriters while maintaining a post-hardcore and emo style. At the end of 2007, they released their first demo, Incubi di maggio.

In November 2009, they launched their first official single, "Vampiro", produced by Marco Barusso and Kikko De Luca, and distributed digitally via iTunes and Nokia Music Store. The single achieved moderate success, and its music video gained airplay on MTV, reaching high positions in the TRL (third place) and Music Box (second place) charts. In May 2010, Blind Fool Love performed at the TRL Music Awards. The following month, they released their second single, "Saranno giorni", with a music video directed by Roberto Cinardi.

In 2011, the band signed with Sony Music and released a new single, "Il pianto", which debuted on the radio on 11 March. The track anticipated the EP of the same name, which was released on 3 May 2011. The EP debuted at second place on the FIMI Albums Chart, but the ranking was quickly revised due to a rule violation, as the physical album had been sold exclusively through a single retail chain. The album then entered the chart two weeks later at fifth place. This led FIMI to review its sales ranking rules, resulting in a new regulation introduced in October 2011.

On 27 September 2011, they released their studio album La strage di Cupido. In November, the music video for "Com'eri un tempo", directed by frontman Tommaso Sabatini, was released. In January 2012, they embarked on a national tour to promote the album.

The band disbanded at the end of the tour. Sabatini began working as a record producer, composer, and music video director, under the pseudonym of Tommaso Ottomano, often collaborating with singer-songwriter Lucio Corsi. Ronconi later joined Corsi's live band as a drummer.

== Members ==
- Tommaso Sabatini – guitars, lead vocals
- Piero Cini – bass
- Marco Ronconi – drums

== Discography ==
=== Studio albums ===
Title	Album details
La strage di Cupido	Release date: 27 September 2011; Label: Sony Music; Formats: CD, digital download

=== Extended plays ===
Title	Album details	Peak chart positions
Title	Album details	ITA
Il pianto	Release date: 3 May 2011; Label: Sony Music; Formats: CD, digital download	5

=== Singles ===
Title	Year	Album
"Vampiro"	2009	Il pianto
"Saranno giorni"	2010	Il pianto
"Il pianto (Il madrigale)"	2011	Il pianto
"La ballata della farfalla melitaea"	2011	Il pianto
"Com'eri un tempo"	2011	La strage di Cupido
