= Bestiario musicale =

Studio album by Lucio Corsi
- Released: 27 January 2017
- Length: 23:58
- Label: Picicca

Lucio Corsi chronology
Altalena Boy (2015)	Bestiario musicale (2017)	Cosa faremo da grandi? (2020)

Bestiario musicale (lit. 'Musical Bestiary') is the debut studio album by Italian singer-songwriter Lucio Corsi. It was released on 27 January 2017 by Picicca Dischi.

The album is inspired by ancient bestiaries, with each track dedicated to an animal of the Maremma, the artist's homeland. The cover was created by the painter Nicoletta Rabiti, Corsi's mother.

== Track listing ==
Bestiario musicale track listing
No.	Title	Length
1.	"La civetta"	2:52
2.	"La lepre"	2:54
3.	"La volpe"	3:34
4.	"L'upupa"	2:52
5.	"Il lupo"	3:59
6.	"L'istrice"	3:38
7.	"Il cinghiale"	2:45
8.	"La lucertola"	1:24
Total length:		23:58

== Personnel ==
- Lucio Corsi – lead vocals, guitar, piano, drums
- Ivo Barbieri – double bass
- Sebastiano De Gennaro – marimba, vibraphone
- Tommaso Ottomano – flute, Jew's harp
- Antonio Cupertino – back vocals, percussion (track 5)

== Charts ==
Chart performance for Bestiario musicale
Chart (2025–2026)	Peak position
Italian Albums (FIMI)	10
