= Fantasma (band) =

Re Fantasma is an Argentine cumbia band formed in 2001, formed by Martín Roisi and Pablo Antico, known by their respective stage names; Fantasma (lead guitar and vocals) and Mr. Negro (lead singer).

Some consider them to be among the first bands in developing a cumbia rap music style mixed with electronic sounds, while their style has been described as "Borrowing from the shanty town atmosphere, they mingle tropical cumbia styles with hip hop and electronic sounds." They are also involved in activities in shanty towns.

Their official website states the band: "started moving in different social levels in an integration crusade, from touring in Paris (2007) and being played on TV´s primetime show "Susana Giménez," to being founders of the multicultural social project Odisea 20, settled in a shanty town (Villa 20, Villa Lugano)." The band took "M.I.A." and dj producer "Diplo" to the heart of a shanty town in Buenos Aires, introducing them to the area. In 2008 they received financing from the Prince Claus Foundation to make the documentary film "Arte Villero/Shanty Town Art" for which their music became its soundtrack. Regarding their music style, reviewer Juan Data has stated: "it's exactly what neo-cumbia from Argentina should be more: kistchy, tacky, unpretentious, dancy, fun, gritty, hip-hoppy and very original," adding: "and they've been doing new-school cumbia since way before it was cool for hipsters and foreigners." Culture Remixed has stated: "Fantasma use the cumbia beat to drop their own very creative blend on top." They are also known around the world as a niche band with a cult following, and part of an emerging music scene. As well, they have gained some note in their circle for having produced a cumbia version of the reggae song Ghost Town, by The Specials. In 2017 edited the LP "Re Fantasma" in which album recorded a song with Mala Fama singer, Hernan Coronel, called "Yo uso Visera" that represents, el barrio, como sucede en todos los países de Latinoamerica.
