= Vita da Carlo =

2021 Italian television series

- Teaser poster
- Genre: Comedy
- Created by: Carlo Verdone; Nicola Guaglianone; Menotti
- Written by: Carlo Verdone; Nicola Guaglianone; Menotti; Pasquale Plastino; Ciro Zecca; Luca Mastrogiovanni
- Directed by: Carlo Verdone; Arnaldo Catinari; Valerio Vestoso
- Starring: Carlo Verdone; Max Tortora; Anita Caprioli; Monica Guerritore; Antonio Bannò; Caterina De Angelis; Maria Paiato; Filippo Contri; Andrea Pennacchi; Sangiovanni; Stefania Rocca; Maccio Capatonda; Claudia Potenza; Sergio Rubini
- Country of origin: Italy
- Original language: Italian
- No. of series: 4
- No. of episodes: 40

Production
- Executive producer: Maurizio Amati
- Producer: Davide Nardini
- Production company: Filmauro

Original release
- Network: Amazon Prime Video (season 1); Paramount+ (season 2–4)
- Release: 5 November 2021 – 28 November 2025

Vita da Carlo (transl. Life as Carlo) is an Italian comedy television series created by Carlo Verdone. It was released on Amazon Prime Video on 5 November 2021. The series has been renewed by Paramount+ for three more seasons.

== Plot ==
=== Season 1 ===
Italian actor and director Carlo Verdone is at a turning point in his life, eager for a change. His producer suggests returning to filmmaking with the familiar characters of his early hits, but he dreams of directing a serious drama. Meanwhile, a chance accident captures him on camera as he passionately discusses Rome's issues in the street. The video goes viral, attracting the attention of a political party that offers him a chance to run for mayor of the city.

=== Season 2 ===
Carlo Verdone has written an autobiographical novel, La carezza della memoria, which has been quite successful. Inspired by its pages, he finally decides to pursue his lifelong dream: making an art film. The producer agrees—on one condition: Carlo's twenty-year-old alter ego must be played by the young singer Sangiovanni. Reluctantly, Carlo agrees to the compromise. However, the production proves challenging, with Sangiovanni's insecurities and the unpredictable behavior of co-star Ludovica Martino complicating matters.

=== Season 3 ===
Carlo Verdone has become a grandfather and, after the failure of his art film, decided to step back from the film industry. However, he unexpectedly receives an offer to become the artistic director of the Sanremo Music Festival. Driven by his love for music and a sense of responsibility, Carlo accepts. Eager to celebrate talent and music, he partners with Ema Stokholma as co-host and begins selecting the competing artists. Among them is the indie singer-songwriter Lucio Corsi, who is initially reluctant to participate in such a mainstream event. As the project unfolds, complications arise.

=== Season 4 ===
Following the embarrassing incident at the Sanremo Festival, Carlo Verdone fled to Nice. Nevertheless, he soon received a new opportunity: a professorship at the Centro Sperimentale di Cinematografia in Rome. Here he reconnects with his old friend Sergio Rubini, with whom he develops a rivalry. Meanwhile, Carlo is haunted by the spirit of death, which appears to him as actor Alvaro Vitali in the role of Pierino.

== Cast ==
=== Main ===
- Carlo Verdone as himself
- Max Tortora as himself (season 1–2), Carlo's friend and colleague
- Anita Caprioli as Annalisa (season 1), a pharmacist fascinated by Carlo
- Monica Guerritore as Sandra, Carlo's ex-wife.
- Antonio Bannò as Chicco, Maddalena's ex-boyfriend
- Caterina De Angelis as Maddalena, Carlo's daughter
- Maria Paiato as Annamaria, Carlo's housemaid
- Filippo Contri as Giovanni, Carlo's son
- Andrea Pennacchi as Gustavo Signoretti (season 1), the party's secretary who supports Carlo's candidacy
- Sangiovanni as himself (season 2), a pop singer hired to play Carlo in a biopic film
- Stefania Rocca as Sofia (season 2–3), a charming writer
- Maccio Capatonda as himself (season 3, guest season 4), Carlo's neighbour
- Claudia Potenza as Ivana (season 4, recurring season 1–2), Max's partner
- Sergio Rubini as himself (season 4)

=== Recurring ===
- Stefano Ambrogi as Ovidio Cantalupo, Carlo's producer
- Giada Benedetti as Rosa Esposito, Carlo's assistant
- Pietro Ragusa as Lucio Nuchi (season 1, 3–4), a film director who works with Carlo
- Brando Improta as a journalist (season 1, 3)
- Massimo Leoni as himself (season 1)
- Fabio Traversa as himself (season 2)
- Augusto Zucchi as Gianfranco Senaldi (season 2), a retired admiral who lives next to Carlo
- Ludovica Martino as herself (season 2)
- Sofia Bisacchi as Giuliana Pandolfi (season 2), an actress replacing Ludovica in the role of Maria F.
- Teresa Castello as Alice (season 2), Carlo's production secretary
- Corrado Solari as Adalberto Castiglioni Cantini (season 2), Carlo's new butler hired by Sandra to replace Annamaria
- Demetra Bellina as Deborah (season 3), Giovanni's girlfriend
- Giovanni Esposito as Thomas (season 3), Carlo's consultant for Sanremo
- Roberto D'Agostino as himself (season 3, guest season 1)
- Aida Flix as Eva (season 3–4), a Spanish girl hired by Carlo as a babysitter
- Lucio Corsi as himself (season 3)
- Lucia Sardo as Maccio's mother (season 3)
- Gianna Nannini as herself (season 3)
- Ema Stokholma as herself (season 3)
- Mascia Musy as Gioia Soderini (season 3), the network's chief executive
- Riccardo Sinibaldi as the recruiter (season 3)
- Miriam Galanti as Greta (season 3), an author and member of the Sanremo creative team
- Radu Murarasu as Diego (season 3), Maddalena's colleague in Milan
- Francesco Zecca as an author for Sanremo (season 3)
- Luca Guastini as Rodrigo (season 3), Ema's boyfriend and escapologist
- Riccardo Diana as Attilio (season 3–4)
- Alvaro Vitali as himself (season 4)
- Phaim Bhuiyan as Arif (season 4)
- Adele Cammarata as Swamy (season 4)
- Mariacarla Casillo as Alma (season 4)
- Matteo Francomano as Salvo (season 4)
- Irene Girotti as Samira (season 4)
- Pietro Paschini as Enrico (season 4)
- Roberto Citran as Alfonso Zotti (season 4)
- Gloria Coco as Liliana, Sandra's mother (season 4)
- Chiara Bassermann as Claire (season 4)
- Corinne Jiga as Elena (season 4)
- Giacomo Stallone as Ciro Savioli (season 4)
- Stefano Fabrizi as Ettore (season 4)
- Valentino Campitelli as Dino (season 4)
- Daniele Locci as Nando (season 4)

=== Guest ===
- Alessandro Haber as himself (season 1)
- Antonello Venditti as himself (season 1)
- Rocco Papaleo as Virgilio (season 1), a learned illegal drug dealer selling contraband medicines in a park at EUR
- Morgan as himself (season 1)
- Stefania Pinna as herself (season 1)
- Paolo Calabresi as Cesare Sarracino (season 1), an aspiring writer who repeatedly attempts suicide with the intent of blackmailing Carlo
- Rossella Brescia as herself (season 1)
- Massimo Ferrero as himself (season 1)
- Christian De Sica as himself (season 2)
- Maria De Filippi as herself (season 2)
- Nina Pons as Marika Cantalupo (season 2), Cantalupo's daughter
- Gabriele Muccino as himself (season 2)
- Claudia Gerini as herself (season 2)
- Zlatan Ibrahimović as himself (season 2)
- Mita Medici as Maria (season 2), the real Maria Effe
- Serena Dandini as herself (season 3)
- Luis Molteni as Don Vincenzo (season 3)
- Ernesto Assante as himself (season 3)
- Zucchero Fornaciari as himself (season 3)
- Gianni Morandi as himself (season 3)
- Luisa Mariani as herself (season 3)
- Francesco Motta as himself (season 3)
- Nino D'Angelo as himself (season 3)
- Betty Senatore as herself (season 3)
- Mino Caprio as the priest of San Salvatore in Lauro (season 4)
- Francesca Fagnani as herself (season 4)
- Enrico Mentana as himself (season 4)
- Renzo Rosso as himself (season 4)
- Anastasiia Kuzmina as Alenka (season 4)
- Carola Santopaolo as Chantal Lucarelli (season 4)
- Giovanni Veronesi as himself (season 4)
- Vera Gemma as herself (season 4)
- Luca Verdone as Mario Verdone (season 4)

== Release ==
The final season of the series premiered at the 20th Rome Film Festival on 26 October 2025.
