= Fantasma (Baustelle album) =

Studio album by Baustelle
- Released: 29 January 2013
- Label: Warner

Baustelle chronology
I mistici dell'Occidente (2010)	Fantasma (2013)	Roma Live! (2015)

Fantasma is the sixth studio album by Italian indie rock band Baustelle, released by Warner Music on 29 January 2013.

== Charts ==
=== Weekly charts ===
Weekly chart performance for Fantasma
Chart (2013)	Peak position
Italian Albums (FIMI)	2

=== Year-end charts ===
Year-end chart performance for Fantasma
Chart (2013)	Position
Italian Albums (FIMI)	62

== Certifications ==
Region	Certification	Certified units/sales
Italy (FIMI)	Gold	25,000^{‡}
^{‡} Sales+streaming figures based on certification alone.
