= Baustelle =

Italian rock band

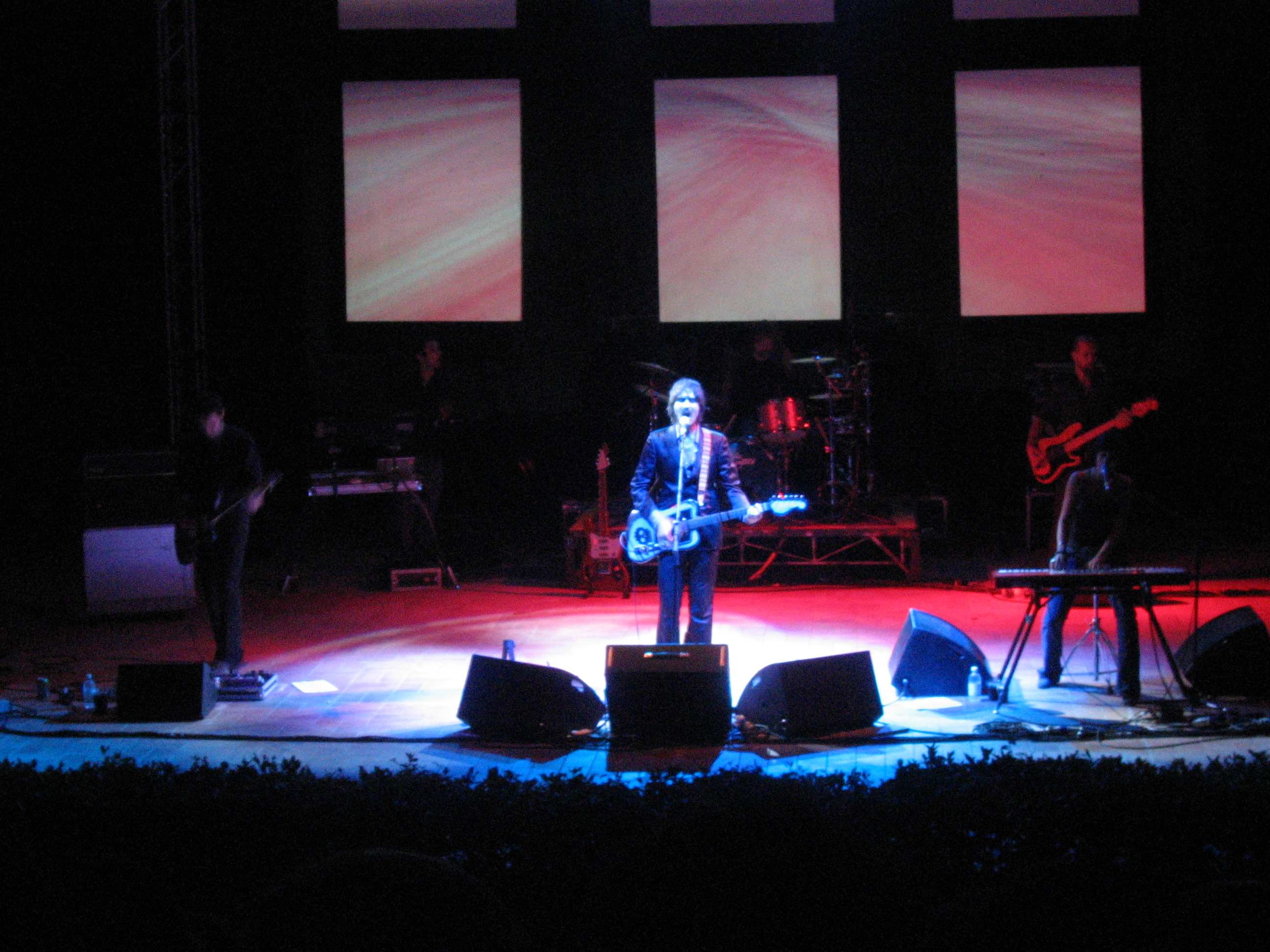
- Baustelle during a live performance

Background information
- Origin: Montepulciano, Tuscany, Italy
- Genres: Indie rock; alternative rock; electronic music
- Years active: 1994–present
- Labels: Warner Music Italy
- Members: Francesco Bianconi; Rachele Bastreghi; Claudio Brasini
- Past members: Fabrizio Massara; Claudio Chiari
- Website: baustelle.it

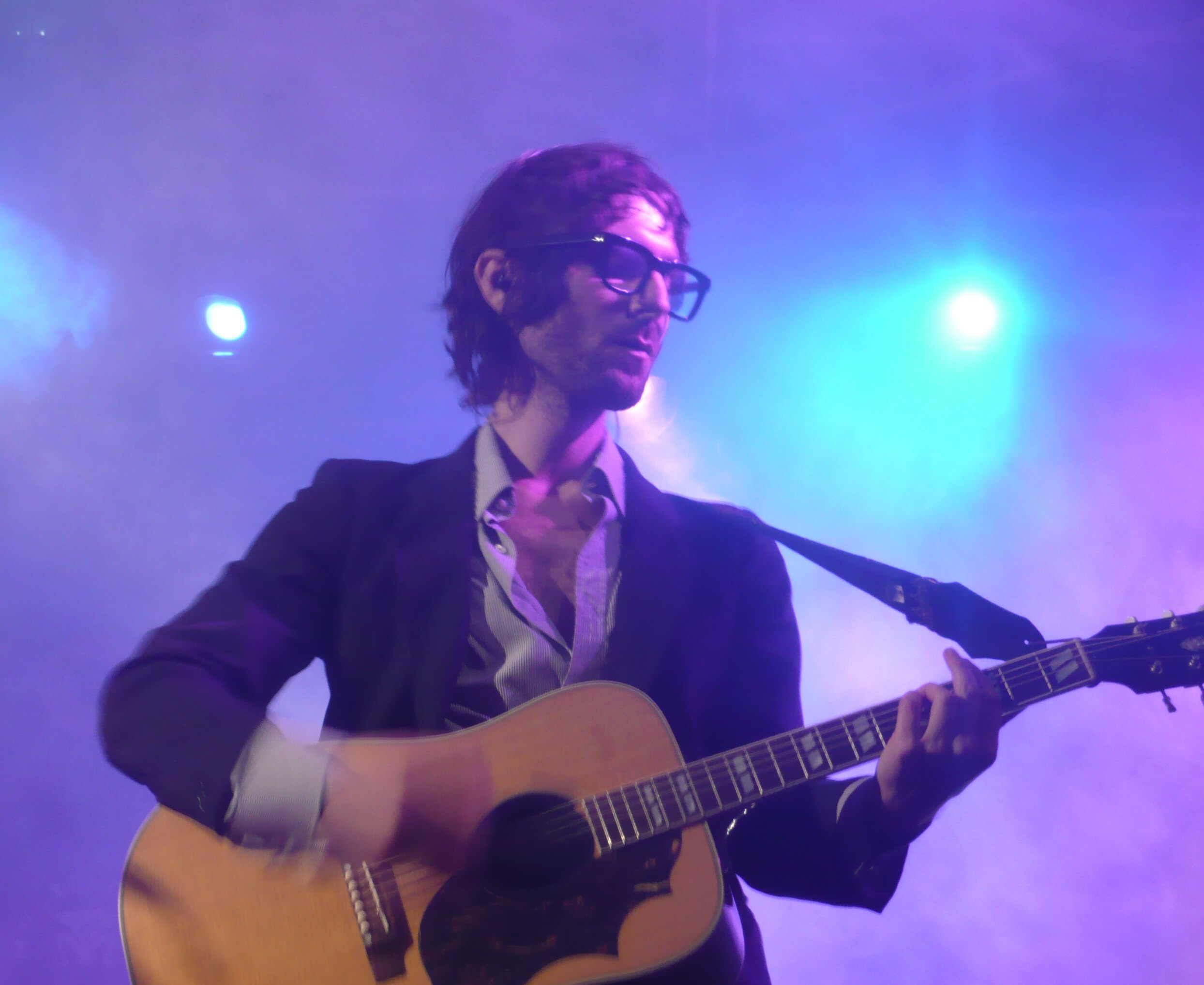
Francesco Bianconi

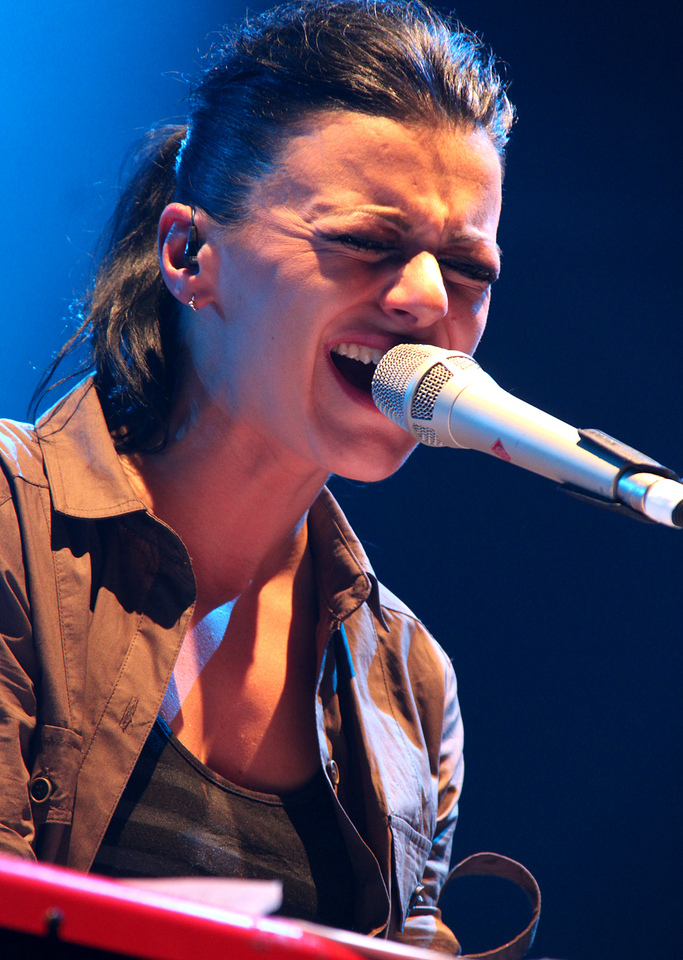
Rachele Bastreghi

Baustelle is an Italian indie rock band from Montepulciano, Tuscany.

== Biography ==
Formed in the mid-'90s in the Tuscan town of Montepulciano, Baustelle (a German word that means "construction site" - or "building site" in English) didn't receive much mainstream attention for their first two albums, 2000's Sussidiario illustrato della giovinezza and 2003's La moda del lento. It was their third one, however, that finally brought them acclaim. Composed of leader Francesco Bianconi on vocals, guitar, and synths, Rachele Bastreghi on vocals and keys, Claudio Brasini on guitar, and Claudio Chiari on drums, the band released La malavita on Warner Bros. Italy in 2005. Mixing the romantic sounds of British artists like the Smiths and Depeche Mode, with Italian composers like Ennio Morricone and Angelo Badalamenti and American acts like Television and Scott Walker, as well as with modern sounds of electronica and indie rock, the record gained immediate attention in the group's home country, resulting in an extensive nationwide tour. In 2010 the band release I mistici dell'Occidente and in 2013 Fantasma.

== Members ==
- Francesco Bianconi - lead vocals, guitar, keyboard
- Rachele Bastreghi - vocals, keyboard, percussion
- Claudio Brasini - guitar

Past members

- Fabrizio Massara - keyboard, mastering
- Claudio Chiari - drums, percussion

== Discography ==
=== Albums ===
- 2000 - Sussidiario illustrato della giovinezza (Baracca e Burattini)
- 2003 - La moda del lento (Mi-Mo/Venus)
- 2005 - La malavita (Warner Bros. Records)
- 2008 - Amen (Warner Bros. Records) (Italy: Gold; 50,000+)
- 2010 - I mistici dell'Occidente (Warner Bros. Records) (Italy: Gold; 30,000+)
- 2013 - Fantasma (Warner Bros. Records)
- 2017 - L'amore e la violenza (Warner Bros. Records)
- 2018 - L'amore e la violenza: Vol. 2
- 2023 - Elvis
- 2025 - El Galactico

=== Singles ===
- "Love Affair" (2003)
- "Arriva lo ye-ye" (2004)
- "La guerra è finita" (2005)
- "Un romantico a Milano" (2006)
- "Charlie fa surf" (2008)
- "Colombo" (2008)
- "Baudelaire" (2008)
- "Gli spietati" (2010)
- "Le rane" (2010)
- "Gomma" (2010)
- "La morte (non esiste più)" (2012)
- "Nessuno" (2013)
- "Monumentale" (2013)
- "Lili Marleen" (2016)
- "Amanda Lear" (2016)
- "Il Vangelo di Giovanni" (2017)
- "Betty" (2017)
- "Veronica, n.2" (2018)
- "Jesse James e Billy Kid" (2018)
- "Contro il mondo" (2023)
- "Milano è la metafora dell'amore" (2023)
- "La nostra vita" (2023)
- "Nabucodonosor", with I Cani (2024)
- "L'ultimo animale", with I Cani (2024)

== Curiosity ==
The 10th track on the 2008 album Amen is Alfredo, a song about a well-known 1981 accident in which Alfredo Rampi lost his life.

== Awards and nominations ==
Year	Award	Nomination	Work	Result
2013	Targa Tenco	Album of the Year	Fantasma	
