= Lucio Corsi =

Italian singer-songwriter

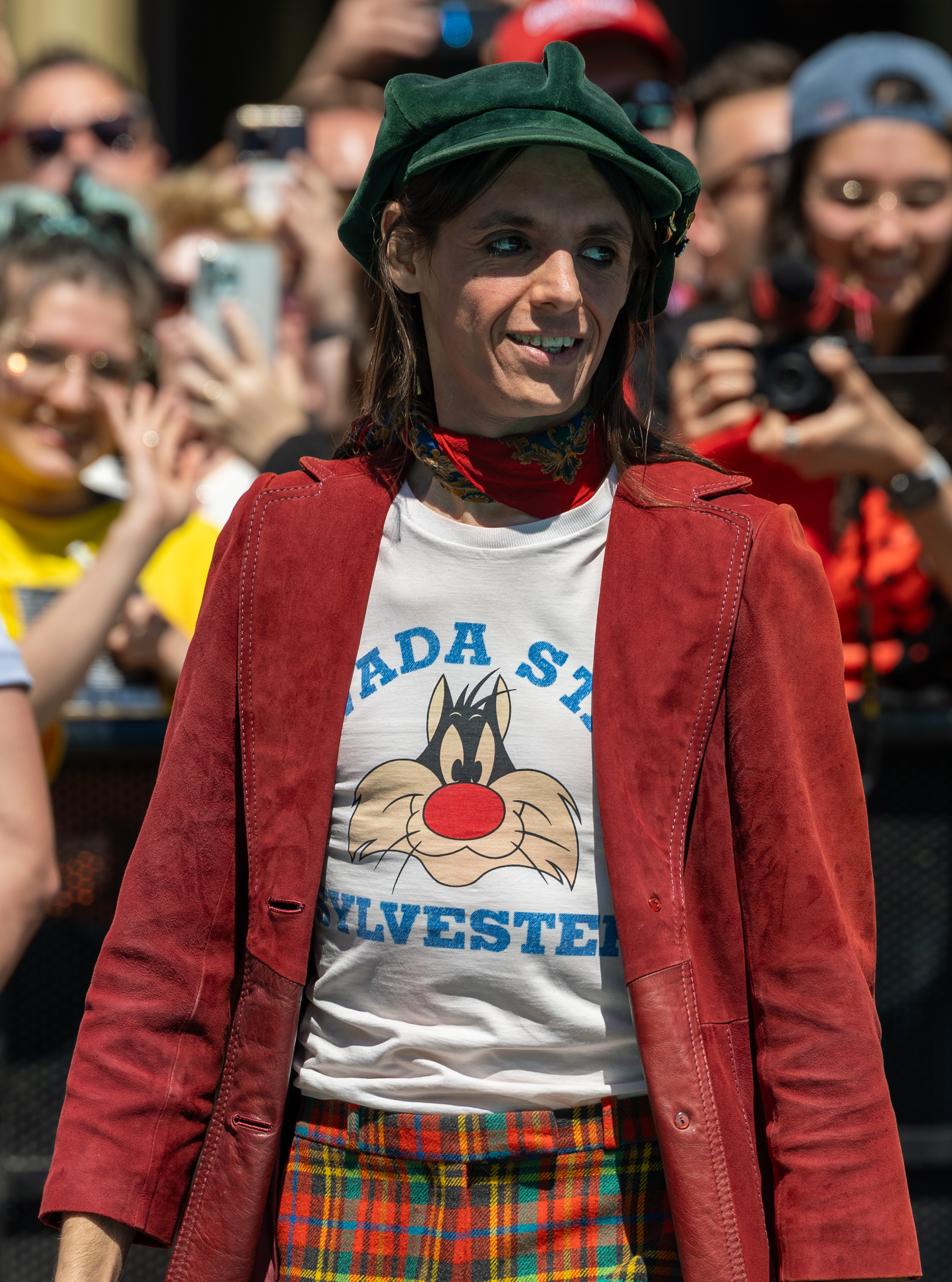
- Corsi at the Eurovision Song Contest 2025

Background information
- Born: 15 October 1993 (age 32); Grosseto, Italy
- Genres: Rock; pop rock; glam rock; blues; folk
- Occupations: Singer; songwriter
- Instruments: Vocals; guitar; piano; harmonica
- Years active: 2011–present
- Labels: Picicca Dischi (2014–2019); Sugar Music (2019–present)

Lucio Corsi (pronounced [ˈluːtʃo ˈkorsi]; born 15 October 1993) is an Italian singer-songwriter. Born and raised in the Maremma region of Tuscany, he is known for his blend of glam rock, surreal lyrics, and fairytale themes.

Corsi began composing music at a young age and moved to Milan after high school to pursue his career, releasing his debut EPs, Vetulonia Dakar and Altalena Boy. In 2017, Corsi released Bestiario musicale, a concept album dedicated to the animals of his native Maremma, and gained recognition by opening for major Italian artists. He signed with Sugar Music in 2019, releasing Cosa faremo da grandi? (2020), La gente che sogna (2023), and Volevo essere un duro (2025), which were praised by critics. Corsi took part in the Sanremo Music Festival 2025 with his song "Volevo essere un duro", finishing in second place. He then represented Italy in the Eurovision Song Contest 2025 with that song, finishing in fifth place overall with 256 points.

In addition to his music career, Corsi has appeared in Gucci's fashion campaigns and participated in Italian television shows such as L'assedio and the series Vita da Carlo by Carlo Verdone. He has been awarded several accolades, including the MEI Best Independent Artist prize and the "Mia Martini" Critics prize.

== Early life and education ==
Lucio Corsi was born in Grosseto in 1993 and grew up in a farmhouse in Val di Campo, near Vetulonia. His family runs a restaurant in nearby Macchiascandona. His mother, Nicoletta Rabiti, is a painter, while his father Marco has worked various jobs, including as a RAI operator, bricklayer, and leather craftsman.

Corsi began composing his first songs at a young age. He stated that he developed a passion for music as a child after watching The Blues Brothers on television. Since 2011, he has performed in local venues and public squares in his hometown. Initially influenced by the experimental style of Peter Gabriel-era Genesis, he composed instrumental progressive rock pieces before shifting toward a singer-songwriter style inspired by artists such as Flavio Giurato and Ivan Graziani.

In 2012, he graduated from the "Guglielmo Marconi" Scientific High School in Grosseto.

== Career ==
=== 2013–2016: Debut and first EPs ===
After graduation, Corsi moved to Milan to pursue a music career, living first along the Naviglio Pavese, then in Via Ripamonti, and finally in Niguarda.

On 29 April 2014, he released his debut EP, Vetulonia Dakar, featuring five tracks. On 7 June, he performed the song "Le api" at the MI AMI Festival, and on 17 August, he opened for Stadio at the final night of Festambiente. During this period, he met Federico Dragogna of Ministri, with whom he produced his second EP, Altalena Boy, as well as Matteo Zanobini, a collaborator of Brunori Sas, who introduced him to the label Picicca Dischi.

Corsi's debut album, Altalena Boy/Vetulonia Dakar, compiling both previously released EPs, was released on 16 January 2015, under Picicca Dischi and distributed by Sony Music. The album received positive critical reception, praised for its glam rock style and surreal lyrics.

=== 2017–2018: Bestiario musicale and recognition ===
On 27 January 2017, Corsi released his first studio album, Bestiario musicale, under Picicca Dischi. A concept album with a fairy-tale theme, it features eight tracks, each dedicated to an animal from his homeland Maremma.

Throughout 2017, he opened for Baustelle and Brunori Sas during their respective theater tours, developing a friendship with Francesco Bianconi. Alongside Bianconi, he was selected as a model for Gucci's Cruise 2018 campaign, walking the runway at Palazzo Pitti in Florence on 29 May. In the autumn, he also participated in Roman Rhapsody, a project curated by creative director Alessandro Michele and photographer Mick Rock. That same year, he was one of the eight finalists of the 28th edition of the Musicultura competition, performing "Altalena Boy" at the Arena Sferisterio in Macerata on 23 June. Corsi was also awarded the MEI Best Emerging Artist prize at the MEI Special Millennials event held in Rome.

In October 2018, he took part in When Mediterranean Meets the Gulf: Words and Notes, a music event in Abu Dhabi and Kuwait City, alongside Margherita Vicario, Nicolò Carnesi, Dimartino, and Fabrizio Cammarata. The event was supported by the Italian Embassy and the Ministry of Foreign Affairs and International Cooperation.

=== 2019–2023: Cosa faremo da grandi? and La gente che sogna ===
In 2019, Corsi signed with Sugar Music and released his new single "Cosa faremo da grandi?" on 25 October, serving as both the lead single and the title track of his second album. The second single, "Freccia Bianca", was released on 9 January 2020, followed by the album Cosa faremo da grandi? on 17 January. The album was produced by Francesco Bianconi and Antonio Cupertino.

In late 2020, he was a regular guest on the television program L'assedio, hosted by Daria Bignardi on Nove, performing alongside his band. In 2021, he competed at the Premio Tenco, becoming one of the youngest participants in the festival's history.

On 21 April 2023, Corsi released his third studio album, La gente che sogna, produced by his longtime friend and fellow countryman Tommaso Ottomano, who has also directed all of his music videos. It was followed by a summer tour. On 17 June, he opened for The Who at Firenze Rocks. After the success of his summer shows, Corsi launched his winter tour in October, starting in Brescia, where he performed and received the Musica da Bere award during the festival of the same name. That same month, he was also honored with the MEI Award for Best Independent Artist of the Year at the Meeting delle Etichette Indipendenti in Faenza.

=== 2024–present: Volevo essere un duro, Sanremo and Eurovision ===
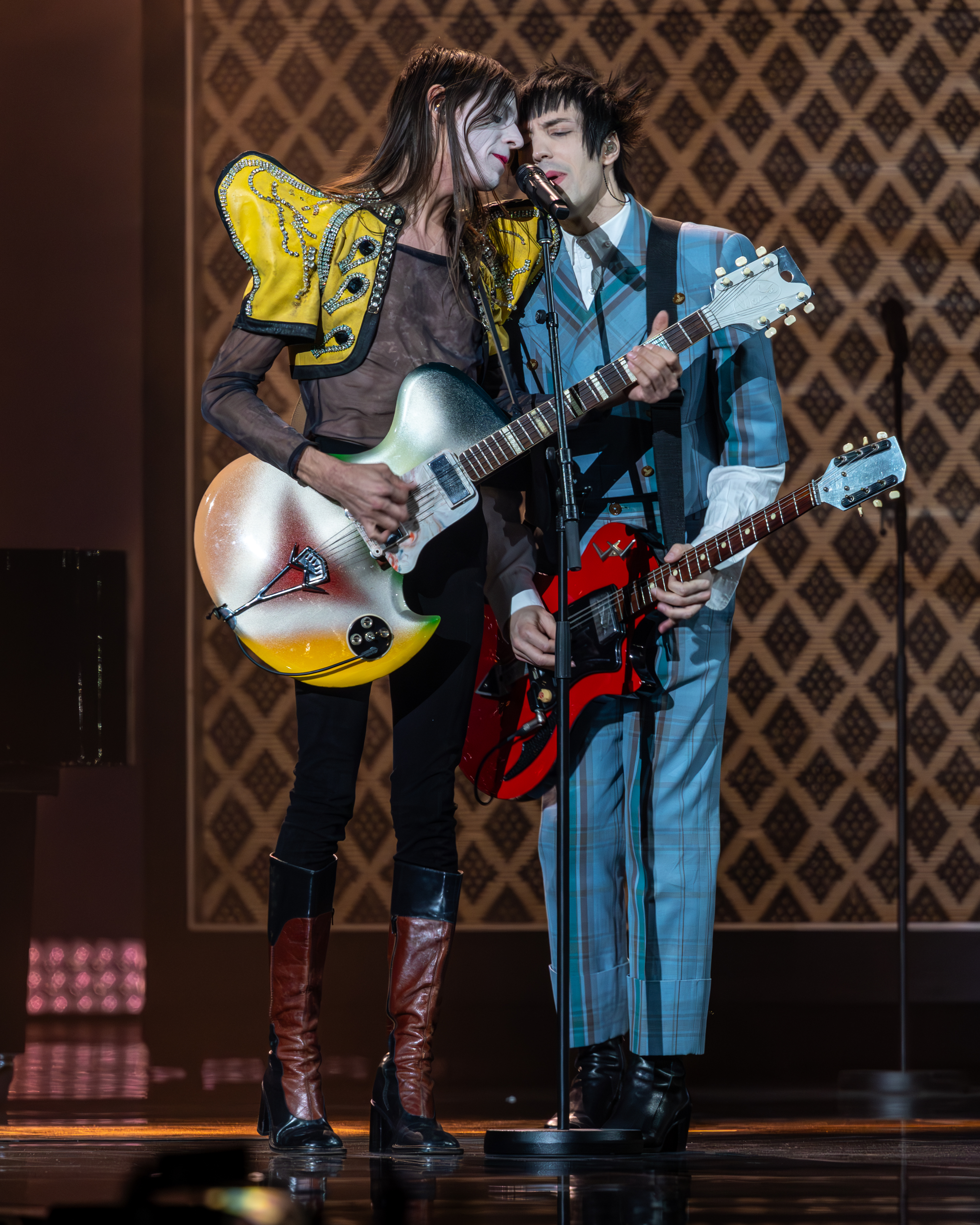
Corsi (left) performing with Tommaso Ottomano at the Eurovision Song Contest 2025

On 12 November 2024, Corsi released the single "Tu sei il mattino", which was featured in the soundtrack of the third season of Vita da Carlo, the TV series by Carlo Verdone. He also made a guest appearance in the show, playing himself.

In February 2025, Corsi competed in the Sanremo Music Festival 2025 with the song "Volevo essere un duro". On the fourth evening dedicated to cover songs, he duetted with Topo Gigio, performing "Nel blu, dipinto di blu" by Domenico Modugno. On the final evening, Corsi placed second overall, but was awarded the Critics Prize. Later that month, RAI appointed him as the Italian entrant for the Eurovision Song Contest 2025 in Basel, Switzerland, after the Sanremo winner Olly declined the opportunity.

His fourth album, Volevo essere un duro, was released on 21 March 2025. For the album and its title track, Corsi was awarded two Tenco Plaques.

In May, Corsi participated in Eurovision, being directly qualified for the final as part of the "Big Five". During his performances, accompanied by Ottomano, he played the harmonica live. This marked the first time an instrument was played live at the contest since 1998, without breaking any rules, as the harmonica was played directly into the microphone. He ultimately finished the competition in fifth place with 256 points.

== Discography ==
- Bestiario musicale (2017)
- Cosa faremo da grandi? (2020)
- La gente che sogna (2023)
- Volevo essere un duro (2025)

== Filmography ==
Television
Year	Title	Role	Notes
2024	Vita da Carlo	Himself	4 episodes (season 3)

== Awards and nominations ==
Year	Award	Category	Nominee(s)	Result	Ref.
2025	Eurovision Awards	Style Icon	Himself	Nominated	
2025	Eurovision Awards	Music Video	Himself	Nominated	

Awards and achievements
Preceded by Angelina Mango with "La noia"	Italy in the Eurovision Song Contest; 2025	Succeeded by Sal Da Vinci with "Per sempre sì"
