= Ivan Graziani =

Background information
- Born: 6 October 1945; Teramo, Kingdom of Italy
- Origin: Teramo, Italy
- Died: 1 January 1997 (aged 51) Novafeltria, Italy
- Genres: Folk rock
- Occupation: Singer-songwriter
- Instruments: Vocals; guitar
- Years active: 1966–1996
- Website: www.ivangraziani.it

Ivan Graziani (6 October 1945 – 1 January 1997) was an Italian singer-songwriter and guitarist.

== Biography ==
Graziani was born in Teramo, in Abruzzo.

His first band was The Serogan, which he formed in 1963 with Giuseppe Canala, Bruno Tartaglia, and Luciano Cordivani. He then played in Anonima Sound until 1972, and issued his debut solo album, Desperation, in 1973. He launched into acting in 1981 and wrote a book, Arcipelago Chieti, in 1988.

== Discography ==
=== Studio albums ===
- La città che io vorrei (1973; reissued in 1980 as Ivan Graziani – special)
- Desperation (in English, 1974)
- Tato Tommaso Guitar (1974)
- Ballata per quattro stagioni (1976)
- I lupi (1977)
- Pigro (1978)
- Agnese dolce Agnese (1979)
- Viaggi e intemperie (1980)
- Q Concert (1980 – Q Disc with Ron and Goran Kuzminac)
- Seni e coseni (1981)
- Ivan Graziani (1983)
- Nove (1984)
- Piknic (1986)
- Ivangarage (1989)
- Cicli e tricicli (1991)
- Malelingue (1994)
- Per sempre Ivan (1999)

=== Compilations/Live ===
- Parla tu (live, 1982)
- Musica Tua - I Grandi Successi (1985)
- Segni d'amore (1989)
- Personale di Ivan Graziani (1990)
- All The best (1994)
- Fragili fiori ... livan (live, 1995)
- Antologia (1997)
- Gli anni 70 (1998)
- I miti musica: Ivan Graziani (2000)
- Firenze-Lugano no stop (2004)
- Ivan Graziani (Slipcase) (2007)
- Le più belle di ... Ivan Graziani (2007)

=== Singles ===
- 1972: Dropout/True true (Airplane Records, AD 2011; under the pseudonym Rockleberry Roll)
- Ottobre 1973: Hi Jack/Give you all my love (Freedom Records, AD 2015; as Rockleberry Roll)
- 1973: Longer is the beach/Without saying good-bye (Freedom Records, ADJ 2015; side A under the pseudonym Ivan & Transport; B-side by The Crazy guitars)
- 1976: Ballata per quattro stagioni/E sei così bella (Numero Uno, ZN 50349)
- 1977: I lupi/Lugano addio (Numero Uno, ZBN 7001)
- 1978: Pigro/Paolina (Numero Uno, ZBN 7041)
- 1979: Agnese/Taglia la testa al gallo (Numero Uno, ZBN 7123)
- 1980: Firenze (canzone triste)/Angelina (Numero Uno, ZBN 7193)
- 1981: Pasqua/Oh mamma mia (Numero Uno, ZBN 7222)
- 1981 – Lontano dalla paura/Grande mondo (RCA Italiana, PB 6561)
- 1982: Parla tu/Fuoco sulla collina (Numero Uno, ZBN 7259)
- 1984: Limiti (affari d'amore)/Geraldine (Numero Uno, ZBN 7373)
- 1985 – Franca ti amo/Vento caldo (Numero Uno, PB 6803)
- 1989: La sposa bambina/Lugano addio (Carosello Records, Cl 20561)
- 1990: Tutto il coraggio che hai (Carosello Records, CA 1; no B-side)
- 1990: Sogno Rosso
- 2004: Non credere

=== DVD ===
- 2007: W Ivan (DVD+CD)
