= Francesco Bianconi =

Italian singer-songwriter

- Bianconi in 2026

Background information
- Born: 25 May 1973 (age 53); Montepulciano, Tuscany, Italy
- Occupations: Singer; songwriter; record producer; writer
- Years active: 1994–present
- Member of: Baustelle

Francesco Bianconi (born 25 May 1973) is an Italian singer, songwriter, producer, novelist, and frontman of the indie rock band Baustelle.

== Life and career ==
Born in Montepulciano, Bianconi attended the "Antonio da Sangallo" Scientific High School and graduated in Communication Sciences from the University of Siena.

In the 1990s, he co-founded the band Baustelle, releasing their debut album Sussidiario illustrato della giovinezza in 2000. After relocating to Milan to work as a journalist, he continued to publish albums with the band while collaborating with artists such as Virginiana Miller and writing for prominent names in the Italian music scene, including Irene Grandi, Noemi, Paola Turci, and Anna Oxa.

Bianconi made his literary debut in 2011 with the novel Il regno animale.

In 2020, he launched his first solo album, Forever, followed by Accade in 2022.

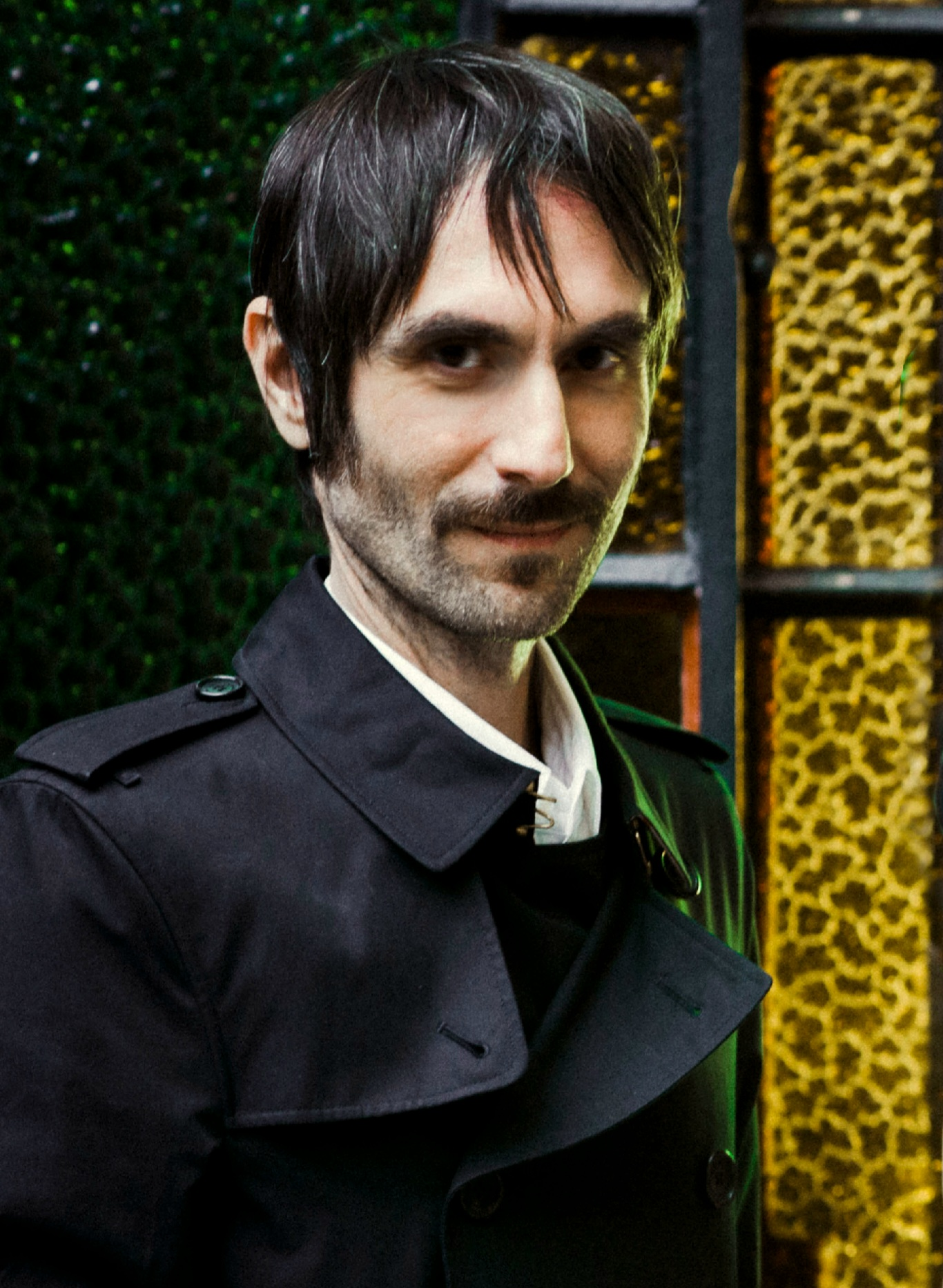
Bianconi in 2016

== Discography ==
=== Studio albums ===
Title	Album details	Peak chart positions
Title	Album details	ITA
Forever	Release date: 16 October 2020; Label: Ponderosa, BMG	11
Accade	Release date: 28 January 2022; Label: Ponderosa, BMG	―

== Filmography ==
Film
Year	Title	Role	Notes
2012	Workers	Poker player	Cameo role
2024	Quasi a casa	Music producer	

== Books ==
- Francesco Bianconi (2011). Il regno animale. Arnoldo Mondadori Editore.
- Francesco Bianconi (2015). La resurrezione della carne. Arnoldo Mondadori Editore.
- Francesco Bianconi; Rachele Bastreghi; Claudio Brasini (2019). I musicisti arrivano già stanchi negli hotel. Fotodiario intimo di Baustelle in movimento. La nave di Teseo.
- Francesco Bianconi; Paolo Bacilieri (2021). Atlante delle case maledette. Rizzoli Lizard.
