= Sugar Music =

Italian record label

- Founded: 1989; 37 years ago
- Founder: Caterina Caselli
- Genre: Various
- Country of origin: Italy
- Location: Milan

Sugar Music is an Italian family-owned music publisher and record label, based in Milan.

Founded by singer Caterina Caselli, the company has been run by her son Filippo Sugar since 1997.

== History ==
Sugar Music was founded in 1989 by Caterina Caselli, after the sale to Warner Music Group of CGD, a historic record company led for years by the singer's father-in-law, Ladislao Sugar, and then by Ladislao's son, Piero Sugar.

Currently, the company serves as a creative hub run by Filippo Sugar, President and CEO, representing the third Sugar family generation. Filippo is the only child of Piero Sugar and Caselli, a key figure in talent scouting and record production in Italy.

Sugar Music’s catalogue includes over 80,000 titles and features songwriters and composers like Ennio Morricone, Nino Rota, Luis Bacalov, Armando Trovaioli, Giancarlo Bigazzi, Umberto Tozzi, Lucio Battisti, Fred Buscaglione, Paolo Conte, and smash hits like "Gloria", "Ti amo", "Self Control", "Nessuno mi può giudicare", "Un'estate italiana", "Con te partirò/Time to Say Goodbye".

Over time, the Sugar recording label has discovered and developed global superstar Andrea Bocelli, Elisa, Negramaro, Malika Ayane and Raphael Gualazzi. Today, the label boasts 23 artists signed exclusively, including Madame, Speranza, Michael Leonardi, Lucio Corsi, Sissi, NYV, Fuera and Kety Fusco.

In 2025, Tiziano Ferro signed with the label for recording and publishing.

The Sugar Music publisher roster features 42 exclusive writers, including Giuliano Sangiorgi, Salmo, Willie Peyote, Mannarino, Stabber; Ketama126, as well as music publishing deals with Tiziano Ferro and Cesare Cremonini.

== Artists ==
Among the international artists of the record label, Andrea Bocelli and the Negramaro stand out.

- Andrea Bocelli
- Negramaro
- Raphael Gualazzi
- Malika Ayane
- Motta
- Madame
- Speranza
- Giovanni Caccamo
- Lucio Corsi
- Riccardo Sinigallia
- NYV
- Sissi
- Fuera
- NDG
- Kety Fusco
- BAIS
- Viito
- Young Kali
- Michael Leonardi
- Gioia
- Soap
