= Italy in the Eurovision Song Contest 2021 =

- Eurovision Song Contest 2021
- Participating broadcaster: Radiotelevisione italiana (RAI)
- Country: Italy
- Selection process: Sanremo Music Festival 2021
- Selection date: 6 March 2021

Competing entry
- Song: "Zitti e buoni"
- Artist: Måneskin
- Songwriters: Damiano David; Ethan Torchio; Thomas Raggi; Victoria De Angelis

Placement
- Final result: 1st, 524 points

Participation chronology

Italy was represented at the Eurovision Song Contest 2021 with the song "Zitti e buoni", written by Damiano David, Ethan Torchio, Thomas Raggi, and Victoria De Angelis, and performed by themselves as Måneskin. The Italian participating broadcaster, Radiotelevisione italiana (RAI), announced in October 2020 that the winning performer(s) of the Sanremo Music Festival 2021 would earn the right to represent the country at the contest. "Zitti e buoni" eventually became the sixty-eighth winning entry of the Eurovision Song Contest and the first Italian entry to win the contest in 31 years. Italy received a total of 524 points, winning the public vote with 318 points and coming at fourth place in the jury vote with 206 points.

== Background ==
Prior to the 2021 contest, Radiotelevisione italiana (RAI) had participated in the Eurovision Song Contest representing Italy forty-five times since its first entry in the inaugural contest in 1956. Since then, it has won the contest on two occasions: in 1964 with the song "Non ho l'età" performed by Gigliola Cinquetti, and in 1990 with "Insieme: 1992" by Toto Cutugno. RAI has withdrawn from the contest a number of times with their most recent absence spanning from 1998 until 2010. Their return in 2011 with the song "Madness of Love", performed by Raphael Gualazzi, placed second—their highest result, to this point, since their victory in 1990. In 2019, the song "Soldi" by Mahmood placed second with 472 points. In 2020, "Fai rumore" by Diodato was set to represent Italy before the contest's cancellation.

Between 2011 and 2013, RAI used the Sanremo Music Festival as an artist selection pool where a special committee would select one of the competing artist, independent of the results in the competition, as the Eurovision entrant. The selected entrant was then responsible for selecting the song they would compete with. For 2014, RAI forwent using the Sanremo Music Festival artist lineup and internally selected their entry. Since 2015, the winning artist of the Sanremo Music Festival is rewarded with the opportunity to represent Italy at the Eurovision Song Contest, although in 2016 the winner declined and the broadcaster appointed the runner-up as its entrant.

== Before Eurovision ==
=== Sanremo Music Festival 2021 ===
RAI confirmed that the performer that would represent Italy at the Eurovision Song Contest 2021 would be selected from the competing artists at the Sanremo Music Festival 2021. According to the rules of Sanremo 2021, the winner of the festival earns the right to represent Italy at the Eurovision Song Contest, but in case the artist is not available or refuses the offer, the organisers of the event reserve the right to choose another participant via their own criteria. The competition took place between 2 and 6 March 2021 with the winner being selected on the last day of the festival.

Twenty-six artists competed in Sanremo 2021. Among the competing artists were former Eurovision Song Contest entrants Francesca Michielin and Ermal Meta, who represented Italy in 2016 and 2018 respectively. Additionally, Noemi and Francesca Michielin and Fedez's songs were co-written by Mahmood, who represented Italy in 2019. The performers were:

| Artist | Song | Songwriter(s) |
|---|---|---|
| Aiello | "Ora" | Antonio Aiello |
| Annalisa | "Dieci" | Annalisa Scarrone, Davide Simonetta, Paolo Antonacci, Jacopo D'Amico |
| Arisa | "Potevi fare di più" | Gigi D'Alessio |
| Bugo | "E invece sì" | Cristian Bugatti, Simone Bertolotti, Andrea Bonomo |
| Colapesce Dimartino | "Musica leggerissima" | Lorenzo Urciullo, Antonio Di Martino |
| Coma_Cose | "Fiamme negli occhi" | Fausto Zanardelli, Francesca Mesiano, Fabio Dalè, Carlo Frigerio |
| Ermal Meta | "Un milione di cose da dirti" | Ermal Meta, Roberto Cardelli |
| Extraliscio feat. Davide Toffolo | "Bianca luce nera" | Luigi De Crescenzo, Mirco Mariani, Elisabetta Sgarbi |
| Fasma | "Parlami" | Tiberio Fazioli, Luigi Zammarano |
| Francesca Michielin and Fedez | "Chiamami per nome" | Francesca Michielin, Federico Lucia, Alessandro Mahmoud, Davide Simonetta, Alessandro Raina, Jacopo D'Amico |
| Francesco Renga | "Quando trovo te" | Roberto Casalino, Francesco Renga, Dario Faini |
| Fulminacci | "Santa Marinella" | Filippo Uttinacci |
| Gaia | "Cuore amaro" | Gaia Gozzi, Jacopo Ettorre, Daniele Dezi, Giorgio Spedicato |
| Ghemon | "Momento perfetto" | Giovanni Picariello, Simone Privitera, Giuseppe Seccia, Daniele Raciti |
| Gio Evan | "Arnica" | Giovanni Giancaspro, Francesco Cattiti |
| Irama | "La genesi del tuo colore" | Filippo Maria Fanti, Giulio Nenna, Dario Faini |
| La Rappresentante di Lista | "Amare" | Veronica Lucchesi, Dario Mangiaracina, Dario Faini, Roberto Cammarata |
| Lo Stato Sociale | "Combat Pop" | Lodovico Guenzi, Alberto Cazzola, Francesco Draicchio, Matteo Romagnoli, Alberto Guidetti, Enrico Roberto, Jacopo Ettorre |
| Madame | "Voce" | Francesca Calearo, Dario Faini, Enrico "Estremo" Botta |
| Malika Ayane | "Ti piaci così" | Malika Ayane, Luigi De Crescenzo, Alessandra Flora, Rocco Rampino |
| Måneskin | "Zitti e buoni" | Damiano David, Ethan Torchio, Thomas Raggi, Victoria De Angelis |
| Max Gazzè | "Il farmacista" | Max Gazzè, Francesco Gazzè, Francesco De Beneditti |
| Noemi | "Glicine" | Tattroli, Ginevra Lubrano, Francesco Fugazza, Dario Faini |
| Orietta Berti | "Quando ti sei innamorato" | Ciro Esposito, Francesco Boccia, Marco Rettani |
| Random | "Torno a te" | Emanuele Caso, Samuel Balice |
| Willie Peyote | "Mai dire mai (La locura)" | Guglielmo Bruno, Daniel Bestonzo, Carlo Cavalieri D'Oro, Giuseppe Petrelli |

==== Final ====
The 26 Big Artists each performed their entry again for a final time on 6 March 2021. A combination of public televoting (25%), press jury voting (25%), demoscopic jury voting (25%) and Sanremo Orchestra (25%) selected the top three to face a superfinal vote, then the winner of Sanremo 2021 was decided by a combination of public televoting (34%), demoscopic jury voting (33%) and press jury voting (33%). Måneskin were declared the winners of the contest with the song "Zitti e buoni".

Final – 6 March 2021
| R/O | Artist | Song | Percentage | Place |
|---|---|---|---|---|
| 1 | Ghemon | "Momento perfetto" | 3.01% | 21 |
| 2 | Gaia | "Cuore amaro" | 3.16% | 19 |
| 3 | Irama | "La genesi del tuo colore" | 5.10% | 5 |
| 4 | Gio Evan | "Arnica" | 2.59% | 23 |
| 5 | Ermal Meta | "Un milione di cose da dirti" | 5.60% | 3 |
| 6 | Fulminacci | "Santa Marinella" | 3.36% | 16 |
| 7 | Francesco Renga | "Quando trovo te" | 2.87% | 22 |
| 8 | Extraliscio feat. Davide Toffolo | "Bianca luce nera" | 3.60% | 12 |
| 9 | Colapesce Dimartino | "Musica leggerissima" | 5.14% | 4 |
| 10 | Malika Ayane | "Ti piaci così" | 3.40% | 15 |
| 11 | Francesca Michielin and Fedez | "Chiamami per nome" | 6.86% | 1 |
| 12 | Willie Peyote | "Mai dire mai (La locura)" | 4.80% | 6 |
| 13 | Orietta Berti | "Quando ti sei innamorato" | 4.10% | 9 |
| 14 | Arisa | "Potevi fare di più" | 4.03% | 10 |
| 15 | Bugo | "E invece sì" | 2.48% | 24 |
| 16 | Måneskin | "Zitti e buoni" | 6.45% | 2 |
| 17 | Madame | "Voce" | 4.16% | 8 |
| 18 | La Rappresentante di Lista | "Amare" | 3.80% | 11 |
| 19 | Annalisa | "Dieci" | 4.38% | 7 |
| 20 | Coma_Cose | "Fiamme negli occhi" | 3.09% | 20 |
| 21 | Lo Stato Sociale | "Combat Pop" | 3.53% | 13 |
| 22 | Random | "Torno a te" | 2.23% | 26 |
| 23 | Max Gazzè | "Il farmacista" | 3.16% | 17 |
| 24 | Noemi | "Glicine" | 3.49% | 14 |
| 25 | Fasma | "Parlami" | 3.16% | 18 |
| 26 | Aiello | "Ora" | 2.45% | 25 |

Superfinal – 6 March 2021
| R/O | Artist | Song | Expert Jury (33%) | Press Jury (33%) | Televote (34%) | Total | Place |
|---|---|---|---|---|---|---|---|
| 1 | Ermal Meta | "Un milione di cose da dirti" | 33.89% | 34.71% | 18.21% | 28.83% | 3 |
| 2 | Francesca Michielin and Fedez | "Chiamami per nome" | 33.13% | 30.13% | 28.26% | 30.49% | 2 |
| 3 | Måneskin | "Zitti e buoni" | 32.97% | 35.16% | 53.53% | 40.68% | 1 |

== At Eurovision ==
Jury points for Italy

Televoting points for Italy

The Eurovision Song Contest 2021 took place at Rotterdam Ahoy in Rotterdam, Netherlands and consisted of two semi-finals on 18 and 20 May and the final on 22 May 2021. According to Eurovision rules, all nations with the exceptions of the host country and the "Big Five" (France, Germany, Italy, Spain, and the United Kingdom) are required to qualify from one of two semi-finals in order to compete for the final; the top ten countries from each semi-final progress to the final. As a member of the "Big Five", Italy automatically qualified to compete in the final. In addition to their participation in the final, Italy was also required to broadcast and vote in one of the two semi-finals.

Italy performed 24th in the grand final on 22 May 2021, following the Netherlands and preceding Sweden. To conform with European Broadcasting Union (EBU) rules governing the use of explicit language, several changes were made to the lyrics of "Zitti e buoni" as performed by Måneskin at the Sanremo Music Festival earlier in the year. However, when the band reprised the song as winners at the end of the competition, these alterations were reversed.

=== Voting ===
Voting during the three shows involved each country awarding two sets of points from 1–8, 10 and 12: one from their professional jury and the other from televoting. Each nation's jury consisted of five music industry professionals who are citizens of the country they represent, with a diversity in gender and age represented. The judges assess each entry based on the performances during the second Dress Rehearsal of each show, which takes place the night before each live show, against a set of criteria including: vocal capacity; the stage performance; the song's composition and originality; and the overall impression by the act. Jury members may only take part in panel once every three years, and are obliged to confirm that they are not connected to any of the participating acts in a way that would impact their ability to vote impartially. Jury members should also vote independently, with no discussion of their vote permitted with other jury members. The exact composition of the professional jury, and the results of each country's jury and televoting were released after the grand final; the individual results from each jury member were also released in an anonymised form.

==== Points awarded to Italy ====
Points awarded to Italy (Final)
| Score | Televote | Jury |
|---|---|---|
| 12 points | Bulgaria; Malta; San Marino; Serbia; Ukraine | Croatia; Georgia; Slovenia; Ukraine |
| 10 points | Albania; Azerbaijan; Croatia; Cyprus; France; Greece; Lithuania; Poland; Romania; Russia; Slovenia; Spain; Switzerland | Bulgaria; Lithuania; North Macedonia; Russia; San Marino; Sweden |
| 8 points | Austria; Belgium; Estonia; Finland; Georgia; Moldova; North Macedonia | Cyprus; Latvia; Serbia; Switzerland |
| 7 points | Australia; Germany; Israel; Latvia; Norway; Portugal | Iceland |
| 6 points | Czech Republic; Ireland | Australia; Austria; Czech Republic; Germany; Finland |
| 5 points | Denmark; Iceland | Norway; Poland |
| 4 points | | Albania; Greece |
| 3 points | Sweden; United Kingdom | Estonia; Portugal; Romania |
| 2 points | Netherlands | Belgium |
| 1 point | | |

==== Points awarded by Italy ====
Points awarded by Italy (Semi-final 1)
| Score | Televote | Jury |
|---|---|---|
| 12 points | Ukraine | Israel |
| 10 points | Romania | Belgium |
| 8 points | Lithuania | Malta |
| 7 points | Russia | Lithuania |
| 6 points | Malta | Norway |
| 5 points | Azerbaijan | Russia |
| 4 points | Belgium | Sweden |
| 3 points | Israel | Cyprus |
| 2 points | Cyprus | Croatia |
| 1 point | Norway | Ireland |

Points awarded by Italy (Final)
| Score | Televote | Jury |
|---|---|---|
| 12 points | Ukraine | Lithuania |
| 10 points | Albania | Finland |
| 8 points | Finland | Iceland |
| 7 points | Russia | Malta |
| 6 points | Iceland | Portugal |
| 5 points | Lithuania | Belgium |
| 4 points | Serbia | Israel |
| 3 points | San Marino | France |
| 2 points | Moldova | Norway |
| 1 point | France | Ukraine |

==== Detailed voting results ====
The following members comprised the Italian jury:

- Giusy Cascio
- Emanuele Lombardini
- Stefano Mannucci
- Gregorio Matteo (jury member in the final)
- Katia Riccardi
- Simone Pinelli (jury member in semi-final 1)

Detailed voting results from Italy (Semi-final 1)
| R/O | Country | Jury | | | | | | | Televote | | |
| R/O | Country | Juror A | Juror B | Juror C | Juror D | Juror E | Rank | Points | Percentage | Rank | Points |
|---|---|---|---|---|---|---|---|---|---|---|---|
| 01 | Lithuania | 7 | 8 | 4 | 4 | 2 | 4 | 7 | 10.73% | 3 | 8 |
| 02 | Slovenia | 12 | 16 | 9 | 15 | 11 | 13 | | 1.77% | 16 | |
| 03 | Russia | 6 | 3 | 3 | 8 | 9 | 6 | 5 | 8.51% | 4 | 7 |
| 04 | Sweden | 4 | 5 | 8 | 6 | 8 | 7 | 4 | 2.60% | 12 | |
| 05 | Australia | 11 | 14 | 13 | 13 | 15 | 14 | | 1.79% | 15 | |
| 06 | North Macedonia | 16 | 15 | 16 | 14 | 16 | 16 | | 2.14% | 14 | |
| 07 | Ireland | 14 | 7 | 10 | 7 | 14 | 10 | 1 | 2.21% | 13 | |
| 08 | Cyprus | 9 | 9 | 11 | 9 | 6 | 8 | 3 | 3.97% | 9 | 2 |
| 09 | Norway | 3 | 6 | 6 | 3 | 10 | 5 | 6 | 3.94% | 10 | 1 |
| 10 | Croatia | 8 | 11 | 15 | 11 | 5 | 9 | 2 | 3.81% | 11 | |
| 11 | Belgium | 2 | 1 | 1 | 5 | 3 | 2 | 10 | 4.53% | 7 | 4 |
| 12 | Israel | 5 | 2 | 2 | 1 | 1 | 1 | 12 | 4.24% | 8 | 3 |
| 13 | Romania | 15 | 13 | 14 | 12 | 12 | 15 | | 11.30% | 2 | 10 |
| 14 | Azerbaijan | 10 | 10 | 12 | 10 | 7 | 11 | | 4.69% | 6 | 5 |
| 15 | Ukraine | 13 | 12 | 5 | 16 | 13 | 12 | | 28.31% | 1 | 12 |
| 16 | Malta | 1 | 4 | 7 | 2 | 4 | 3 | 8 | 5.45% | 5 | 6 |

Detailed voting results from Italy (Final)
| R/O | Country | Jury | | | | | | | Televote | | |
| R/O | Country | Juror A | Juror B | Juror C | Juror D | Juror E | Rank | Points | Percentage | Rank | Points |
|---|---|---|---|---|---|---|---|---|---|---|---|
| 01 | Cyprus | 19 | 15 | 12 | 8 | 19 | 15 | | 1.47% | 21 | |
| 02 | Albania | 20 | 18 | 14 | 20 | 25 | 21 | | 11.79% | 2 | 10 |
| 03 | Israel | 13 | 4 | 5 | 7 | 15 | 7 | 4 | 1.81% | 19 | |
| 04 | Belgium | 7 | 3 | 6 | 3 | 13 | 6 | 5 | 1.49% | 20 | |
| 05 | Russia | 9 | 6 | 16 | 19 | 12 | 11 | | 6.20% | 4 | 7 |
| 06 | Malta | 3 | 12 | 2 | 6 | 2 | 4 | 7 | 3.06% | 14 | |
| 07 | Portugal | 2 | 9 | 7 | 5 | 4 | 5 | 6 | 2.57% | 16 | |
| 08 | Serbia | 25 | 23 | 19 | 17 | 23 | 25 | | 4.69% | 7 | 4 |
| 09 | United Kingdom | 18 | 13 | 18 | 14 | 22 | 18 | | 0.49% | 25 | |
| 10 | Greece | 17 | 16 | 17 | 10 | 21 | 17 | | 1.38% | 22 | |
| 11 | Switzerland | 24 | 21 | 21 | 21 | 16 | 24 | | 3.08% | 12 | |
| 12 | Iceland | 8 | 2 | 4 | 2 | 6 | 3 | 8 | 5.97% | 5 | 6 |
| 13 | Spain | 21 | 14 | 13 | 22 | 18 | 19 | | 0.85% | 24 | |
| 14 | Moldova | 22 | 17 | 20 | 18 | 24 | 23 | | 4.12% | 9 | 2 |
| 15 | Germany | 14 | 25 | 23 | 25 | 17 | 22 | | 2.19% | 17 | |
| 16 | Finland | 1 | 10 | 3 | 4 | 3 | 2 | 10 | 6.54% | 3 | 8 |
| 17 | Bulgaria | 23 | 24 | 8 | 13 | 7 | 14 | | 2.83% | 15 | |
| 18 | Lithuania | 5 | 8 | 1 | 1 | 1 | 1 | 12 | 4.88% | 6 | 5 |
| 19 | Ukraine | 6 | 7 | 25 | 24 | 5 | 10 | 1 | 17.19% | 1 | 12 |
| 20 | France | 12 | 1 | 15 | 12 | 10 | 8 | 3 | 3.47% | 10 | 1 |
| 21 | Azerbaijan | 15 | 22 | 24 | 23 | 11 | 20 | | 2.10% | 18 | |
| 22 | Norway | 4 | 11 | 10 | 9 | 8 | 9 | 2 | 3.16% | 11 | |
| 23 | Netherlands | 16 | 19 | 11 | 16 | 14 | 16 | | 1.30% | 23 | |
| 24 | Italy | | | | | | | | | | |
| 25 | Sweden | 10 | 20 | 9 | 11 | 9 | 12 | | 3.06% | 13 | |
| 26 | San Marino | 11 | 5 | 22 | 15 | 20 | 13 | | 4.31% | 8 | 3 |
