= Malavita =

Malavita (Italian for 'underworld', lit. 'bad life') may refer to:

- Malavita (1951 film), an Italian film
- Malavita (2013 film), a French film which was released in the USA under the title The Family
- Malavita (Badfellas for 2010 English translation), a novel by French writer Tonino Benacquista
- "Malavita" (song), a 2024 song by Coma_Cose

== See also ==
- Mala vita, 1892 opera by Umberto Giordano
