= Sanremo Music Festival 2021 =

Italian song contest (71st edition)

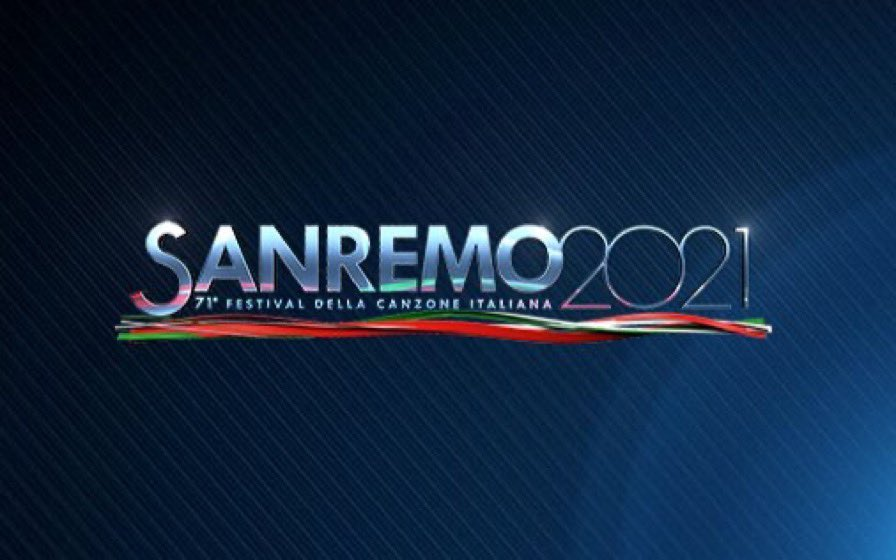

Dates and venue
- Semi-final 1: 2 March 2021
- Semi-final 2: 3 March 2021
- Semi-final 3: 4 March 2021
- Semi-final 4: 5 March 2021
- Final: 6 March 2021
- Venue: Teatro Ariston; Sanremo, Italy

Production
- Broadcaster: Radiotelevisione italiana (RAI)
- Director: Stefano Vicario
- Musical director: Leonardo De Amicis
- Artistic director: Amadeus
- Presenters: Amadeus and Fiorello with Matilda De Angelis (first night) Elodie (second night) Vittoria Ceretti (third night) Barbara Palombelli (fourth night) Beatrice Venezi (fourth night)

Big Artists section
- Number of entries: 26
- Winner: "Zitti e buoni" Måneskin

Newcomers' section
- Number of entries: 8
- Winner: "Polvere da sparo" Gaudiano

The Sanremo Music Festival 2021 (Italian: Festival di Sanremo 2021), officially the 71st Italian Song Festival (71º Festival della canzone italiana), was the 71st edition of the annual Sanremo Music Festival, a television song contest held in the Teatro Ariston of Sanremo, organised and broadcast by Radiotelevisione italiana (RAI). The show was held between 2 and 6 March 2021. The show was presented by Amadeus, who also served as the artistic director for the competition. Fiorello returned as co-host after appearing as a regular guest in the previous edition.

The festival was won by Måneskin with the song "Zitti e buoni"; their victory earned them the right to represent Italy in the Eurovision Song Contest 2021, which they went on to win as well. Gaudiano won the Newcomers' section with "Polvere da sparo".

== Format ==
The 2021 edition of the Sanremo Music Festival took place at the Teatro Ariston in Sanremo, organized by the Italian public broadcaster RAI. The artistic director and the presenter for the competition was Amadeus, for the second consecutive year.

For the first time in the event's history, the Festival took place without a live audience, due to the COVID-19 pandemic.

=== Presenters ===
Shortly after the end of the 2020 edition, RAI officially confirmed Amadeus as the presenter of the 71st edition of the Sanremo Music Festival. Together with Amadeus, Italian comedian and television presenter Fiorello returned, after appearing as a regular guest in the previous edition, to cover the role of co-host. Alongside Amadeus and Fiorello, five co-hosts alternated during the five evenings: Matilda De Angelis, Elodie, Vittoria Ceretti, Barbara Palombelli and Beatrice Venezi. British supermodel Naomi Campbell was set to participate as co-host in the first evening, but due to restrictions imposed in the United States for the containment of the COVID-19 pandemic, she had to give up the aforementioned role.

=== Voting ===
Voting occurred through the combination of four methods:

- Public televoting, carried out via landline, mobile phone, the contest's official mobile app, and online voting.
- Jury of the Press Room, TV, Radio and Web.
- Demoscopic jury, composed by music fans who voted from their homes via an electronic voting system managed by Ipsos.
- Musicians and singers of the Sanremo Music Festival Orchestra.

Voting during the five evenings for Big Artist section:

- First evening: Demoscopic jury.
- Second evening: Demoscopic jury.
- Third evening: Music and singers of the Sanremo Music Festival Orchestra.
- Fourth evening: Jury of the Press Room, TV, Radio and Web.
- Fifth evening: Televote. At the end, a ranking of the songs/artists was drawn up determined by the average of voting percentages obtained in all the evenings, determining the three finalist. To select the winner the voting systems had the following weight: 34% Public televoting; 33% Jury of the Press Room, TV, Radio and Web; 33% Demoscopic Jury.

Voting during the three evenings for Newcomers' section:

- First evening: The voting systems had the following weight: 34% Public televoting; 33% Jury of the Press Room, TV, Radio and Web; 33% Demoscopic Jury.
- Second evening: The voting systems had the following weight: 34% Public televoting; 33% Jury of the Press Room, TV, Radio and Web; 33% Demoscopic Jury.
- Fourth evening: The voting systems had the following weight: 34% Public televoting; 33% Jury of the Press Room, TV, Radio and Web; 33% Demoscopic Jury.

== Selections ==
=== Newcomers' section ===
The artists competing in the Newcomers' section were selected through two separate contests: Sanremo Giovani and Area Sanremo.

==== Sanremo Giovani 2020 ====
On 7 October 2020, Rai Commission for Sanremo Music Festival 2021 announced a list of 961 acts, but only 61 artists coming from all Italian regions -excluding Basilicata and Valle d'Aosta- and from abroad were selected in the first phase.

On 20 October 2020, the jury of Sanremo Festival 2021 has selected the 20 semi-finalists. The selection was preceded by five late night shows on "AmaSanremo", hosted by Amadeus and Riccardo Rossi, where the artists and their entries were presented and were selected the 10 finalist.

On 17 December 2020, the ten finalists performed their songs at Sanremo Casino in Sanremo, with the show Sanremo Giovani 2020 broadcast on Rai 1 presented by Amadeus and Riccardo Rossi. The six selected by the jury composed by Luca Barbarossa, Beatrice Venezi and Piero Pelù, televote and music commission were added to the two entries of Area Sanremo, for a total of eight young emerging artists in the category of the Newcomers' section of the Sanremo Music Festival 2021. Gaudiano, Folcast, Greta Zuccoli, Davide Shorty, Wrongonyou and Avincola were chosen as contestants of the Newcomers' section of the Sanremo Music Festival 2021.

Enters Sanremo 2021

R/O	Artist	Song	TV Jury		Music Comm.	Televote	Total
1	Folcast	"Scopriti"	28	10.65%	12.41%	11.81%	11.62%
2	Greta Zuccoli	"Ogni cosa sa di te"	28	10.65%	12.41%	11.98%	11.68%
3	Wrongonyou	"Lezioni di volo"	30	11.41%	12.41%	7.26%	10.33%
4	Gaudiano	"Polvere da sparo"	29	11.03%	12.41%	10.71%	11.38%
5	I Desideri	"Lo stesso cielo"	20	7.60%	6.20%	15.03%	9.67%
6	Avincola	"Goal!"	24	9.13%	12.41%	10.64%	10.72%
7	Hu	"Occhi Niagara"	30	11.41%	12.41%	5.80%	9.83%
8	M.e.r.l.o.t	"Sette volte"	21	7.98%	9.51%	7.76%	7.32%
9	Davide Shorty	"Regina"	25	9.51%	6.70%	13.55%	9.95%
10	Le Larve	"Musicareoplano"	28	10.65%	6.45%	5.46%	7.50%

==== Area Sanremo ====
After the auditions, RAI Commission - composed by Vittorio De Scalzi, Rossana Casale, Gianmaurizio Foderaro, Erica Mou and G-Max; plus the participation of Maurilio Giordana - identified 8 finalists for the competition among the 600 acts:

- Aurora Fadell
- Dellai
- Elena Faggi
- Federica Marinari
- Francesca Miola
- Guasto
- Luca d'Arbenzio
- Mirall

==== Newcomers' Finalists ====
- Gaudiano - "Polvere da sparo"
- Folcast - "Scopriti"
- Greta Zuccoli - "Ogni cosa sa di te"
- Davide Shorty - "Regina"
- Wrongonyou - "Lezioni di volo"
- Avincola - "Goal!"
- Elena Faggi - "Che ne so"
- Dellai - "Io sono Luca"

=== Big section ===
The Big Artists section of the contest saw the participation of 26 artists. All the artists performed and were scored throughout the week, and every competing artist advanced to the final night.

== Competing entries ==
Competing songs and artists, showing writers, orchestra conductor and results achieved
Big Artists section
Song	Artist	Songwriter(s)	Orchestra conductor	Rank	Sanremo Music Festival Awards
"Zitti e buoni"	Måneskin	Damiano David; Ethan Torchio; Thomas Raggi; Victoria De Angelis	Enrico Melozzi	1	Winner of the "Big Artists" section – Golden Lion
"Chiamami per nome"	Francesca Michielin & Fedez	Federico "Fedez" Lucia; Francesca Michielin; Jacopo Matteo Luca "Dargen" D'Amico; Davide Simonetta; Alessandro Raina; Alessandro "Mahmood" Mahmoud	Fabio Gurian	2	
"Un milione di cose da dirti"	Ermal Meta	Ermal Meta; Roberto Cardelli	Diego Calvetti	3	"Giancarlo Bigazzi" Award for Best Arrangement
"Musica leggerissima"	Colapesce & Dimartino	Lorenzo "Colapesce" Urciullo; Antonio Di Martino	Davide Rossi	4	"Lucio Dalla" Press, Radio, TV, & Web Award
"La genesi del tuo colore"	Irama	Filippo Maria Fanti; Giulio Nenna; Dario "Dardust" Faini	Giulio Nenna	5	
"Mai dire mai (La locura)"	Willie Peyote	Guglielmo "Willie Peyote" Bruno; Daniel Bestonzo; Carlo Cavalieri D'Oro; Giuseppe Petrelli	Daniel Bestonzo	6	"Mia Martini" Critics' Award
"Dieci"	Annalisa	Annalisa Scarrone; Davide Simonetta; Paolo Antonacci; Jacopo Matteo Luca "Dargen" D'Amico	Daniel Bestonzo	7	
"Voce"	Madame	Francesca "Madame" Calearo; Dario "Dardust" Faini; Enrico "Estremo" Botta	Carmelo Patti	8	Lunezia Award for Best Music-letterary Value; "Sergio Bardotti" Award for Best Lyrics
"Quando ti sei innamorato"	Orietta Berti	Ciro Esposito; Francesco Boccia; Marco Rettani	Enzo Campagnoli	9	
"Potevi fare di più"	Arisa	Gigi D'Alessio	Adriano Pennino	10	
"Amare"	La Rappresentante di Lista	Veronica Lucchesi; Dario Mangiaracina; Dario "Dardust" Faini; Roberto Cammarata	Carmelo Patti	11	"Nilla Pizzi" Award for Best Interpretation
"Bianca luce nera"	Extraliscio feat. Davide Toffolo	Pacifico; Mirco Mariani	Roberto Molinetti	12	
"Combat Pop"	Lo Stato Sociale	Alberto Cazzola; Francesco Draicchio; Jacopo Ettorre; Lodovico Guenzi; Alberto Guidetti; Enrico Roberto; Matteo Romagnoli	Fabio Gargiùlo	13	
"Glicine"	Noemi	Tattroli; Ginevra Lubrano; Francesco Fugazza; Dario "Dardust" Faini	Andrea Rondini	14	
"Ti piaci così"	Malika Ayane	(Malika Ayane; Pacifico; Alessandra Flora; Rocco "Congorock" Rampino	Daniele Parziani	15	
"Santa Marinella"	Fulminacci	Filippo "Fulminacci" Uttinacci	Rodrigo D'Erasmo	16	
"Il farmacista"	Max Gazzè (Note: Credited as "Max Gazzè & La Trifluoperazina Monstery Band" only in the first evening.)	Max Gazzè; Francesco Gazzè; Francesco De Benedittis	Clemente Ferrari	17	
"Parlami"	Fasma	Tiberio "Fasma" Fazioli; Luigi "GG" Zammarano	Enrico Melozzi	18	
"Cuore amaro"	Gaia	Gaia Gozzi; Jacopo Ettorre; Daniele Dezi; Giorgio Spedicato	Daniele Dezi	19	
"Fiamme negli occhi"	Coma_Cose	Fausto Zanardelli; Francesca Mesiano; Fabio Dalè; Carlo Frigerio	Vittorio Cosma	20	
"Momento perfetto"	Ghemon	Giovanni Luca Picariello; Simone Privitera; Giuseppe Seccia; Daniele Raciti	Rodrigo D'Erasmo	21	
"Quando trovo te"	Francesco Renga	Roberto Casalino; Davide Petrella; Dario "Dardust" Faini	Carmelo Patti	22	
"Arnica"	Gio Evan	Giovanni "Gio Evan" Giancaspro; Francesco Catitti	Valeriano Chiaravalle	23	
"E invece sì"	Bugo	Cristian "Bugo" Bugatti; Simone Bertolotti; Andrea Bonomo	Simone Bertolotti	24	
"Ora"	Aiello	Antonio Aiello	Jacopo Senigaglia	25	
"Torno a te"	Random	Emanuele "Random" Caso; Samuel Balice	Valeriano Chiaravalle	26	
Newcomers' section
Song	Artist	Songwriter(s)	Orchestra conductor	Rank	Sanremo Music Festival Awards
"Polvere da sparo"	Gaudiano	Luca Gaudiano; Francesco Cataldo	Valeriano Chiaravalle	1	Winner of the Newcomers' section – Silver Lion
"Regina"	Davide Shorty	Davide "Shorty" Sciortino; Claudio Guarcello; Davide Savarese; Emanuele Triglia	Carmelo Patti	2	"Lunezia" Award for Best Lyrics; "Enzo Jannacci" Award for Best Performance; "Lucio Dalla" Press, Radio, TV, & Web Award
"Scopriti"	Folcast	Daniele "Folcast" Folcarelli; Tommaso Colliva; Raffaele Scogna	Rodrigo D'Erasmo	3	
"Lezioni di volo"	Wrongonyou	Marco "Wrongonyou" Zitelli; Adel Al Kassem; Riccardo Sciré	Valeriano Chiaravalle	4	"Mia Martini" Critics' Award
"Goal!"	Avincola	Simone Avincola	Edoardo Petretti	Eliminated	
"Io sono Luca"	Dellai	Luca Dellai; Matteo Dellai	Federico Melozzi	Eliminated	
"Che ne so"	Elena Faggi	Elena Faggi; Francesco Faggi	Beppe Vessicchio	Eliminated	
"Ogni cosa sa di te"	Greta Zuccoli	Greta Zuccoli	Rodrigo D'Erasmo	Eliminated	

== Shows ==
=== First evening ===
The first thirteen Big Artists each performed their song and the first four Newcomers each performed their song for the first time in two matches, two for each one.

==== Big Artists ====
R/O	Artist	Song	Votes	Place
R/O	Artist	Song	Demoscopic Jury	Place
1	Arisa	"Potevi fare di più"	6th	11
2	Colapesce & Dimartino	"Musica leggerissima"	9th	17
3	Aiello	"Ora"	13th	26
4	Francesca Michielin & Fedez	“Chiamami per nome”	4th	7
5	Max Gazzè & Trifluoperazina Monstery Band	"Il farmacista"	8th	16
6	Noemi	"Glicine"	2nd	5
7	Madame	"Voce"	11th	20
8	Måneskin	"Zitti e buoni"	7th	15
9	Ghemon	"Momento perfetto"	12th	25
10	Coma_Cose	"Fiamme negli occhi"	10th	18
11	Annalisa	"Dieci"	1st	2
12	Francesco Renga	"Quando trovo te"	5th	10
13	Fasma	"Parlami"	3rd	6

==== Newcomers ====
Advanced in the semi-final

R/O	Artist	Song	Votes			Place
R/O	Artist	Song	Demoscopic Jury (weight 33%)	Press Jury (weight 33%)	Public (weight 34%)	Place
1	Gaudiano	"Polvere da sparo"	26.26%	26.20%	36.88%	29.85%
2	Elena Faggi	"Che ne so"	23.42%	22.79%	17.28%	21.12%
3	Avincola	"Goal!"	24.27%	24.17%	22.37%	23.59%
4	Folcast	"Scopriti"	26.05%	26.85%	23.47%	25.47%

=== Second evening ===
The other thirteen Big Artists each performed their song and the other four Newcomers each performed their song for the first time.

==== Big Artists ====
R/O	Artist	Song	Votes	
R/O	Artist	Song	Demoscopic Jury	Place
1	Orietta Berti	"Quando ti sei innamorato"	11th	22
2	Bugo	"E invece sì"	13th	24
3	Gaia	"Cuore amaro"	6th	12
4	Lo Stato Sociale	"Combat Pop"	4th	8
5	La Rappresentante di Lista	"Amare"	8th	14
6	Malika Ayane	"Ti piaci così"	3rd	4
7	Ermal Meta	"Un milione di cose da dirti"	1st	1
8	Extraliscio feat. Davide Toffolo	"Bianca luce nera"	9th	19
9	Random	"Torno a te"	12th	23
10	Fulminacci	"Santa Marinella"	7th	13
11	Willie Peyote	"Mai dire mai (La locura)"	5th	9
12	Gio Evan	"Arnica"	10th	21
13	Irama (Note: Due to two staff members of Irama's team testing positive for COVID-19, Irama was placed in quarantine, and thus was not able to perform live. The footage from his dress rehearsals was broadcast instead.)	"La genesi del tuo colore"	2nd	3

==== Newcomers ====
Advanced in the semi-final

R/O	Artist	Song	Votes			Place
R/O	Artist	Song	Demoscopic Jury (weight 33%)	Press Jury (weight 33%)	Public (weight 34%)	Place
1	Wrongonyou	"Lezioni di volo"	26.01%	26.59%	24.45%	25.67%
2	Greta Zuccoli	"Ogni cosa sa di te"	23.78%	23.42%	25.98%	24.41%
3	Davide Shorty	"Regina"	25.00%	26.82%	30.51%	27.47%
4	Dellai	"Io sono Luca"	25.22%	23.17%	19.07%	22.45%

=== Third evening ===
All the twenty-six Big Artists each performed a song that are part of the history of the Italian music. The artists can choose whether or not to be accompanied by Italian or foreign guests.

==== Big Artists ====
R/O	Artist	Guest	Song (Original artist)	Votes	
R/O	Artist	Guest	Song (Original artist)	Sanremo Orchestra	Place
1	Noemi	Neffa	"Prima di andare via" (Neffa)	17th	12
2	Fulminacci	Valerio Lundini & Roy Paci	"Penso positivo" (Jovanotti)	15th	15
3	Francesco Renga	Casadilego	"Una ragione di più" (Ornella Vanoni)	19th	18
4	Extraliscio feat. Davide Toffolo	Peter Pichler	"Medley Rosamunda" (Medley)	3rd	8
5	Fasma	Nesli	"La fine" (Nesli)	20th	16
6	Bugo	Pinguini Tattici Nucleari	"Un'avventura" (Lucio Battisti)	23rd	23
7	Francesca Michielin & Fedez		"E allora felicità" (Medley)	21st	19
8	Irama		"Cyrano" (Francesco Guccini)	13th	5
9	Måneskin	Manuel Agnelli	"Amandoti" (CCCP - Fedeli alla linea)	6th	10
10	Random	The Kolors	"Ragazzo fortunato" (Jovanotti)	25th	24
11	Willie Peyote	Samuele Bersani	"Giudizi universali" (Samuele Bersani)	4th	3
12	Orietta Berti	Le Deva	"Io che amo solo te" (Sergio Endrigo)	2nd	9
13	Gio Evan	The singers of The Voice Senior (Erminio Sinni, Elena Ferretti, Ann Harper, Gianni Pera)	"Gli anni" (883)	24th	22
14	Ghemon	Neri per Caso	L'essere infinito (L.E.I) (Medley)	10th	20
15	La Rappresentante di Lista	Donatella Rettore	"Splendido splendente" (Donatella Rettore)	9th	11
16	Arisa	Michele Bravi	"Quando" (Pino Daniele)	5th	4
17	Madame		"Prisencolinensinainciusol" (Adriano Celentano)	18th	21
18	Lo Stato Sociale	Emanuela Fanelli, Francesco Pannofino & the Sanremo crew	"Non è per sempre" (Afterhours)	11th	6
19	Annalisa	Fredrico Poggipollini	"La musica è finita" (Ornella Vanoni)	7th	2
20	Gaia	Lous and the Yakuza	"Mi sono innamorato di te" (Luigi Tenco)	12th	14
21	Colapesce & Dimartino		"Povera patria" (Franco Battiato)	14th	17
22	Coma_Cose	Alberto Radius & Mamakass	"Il mio canto libero" (Lucio Battisti)	26th	26
23	Malika Ayane		"Insieme a te non ci sto più" (Caterina Caselli)	16th	7
24	Max Gazzè	Daniele Silvestri & MMB	"Del mondo" (CSI)	8th	13
25	Ermal Meta	Napoli Mandolin Orchestra	"Caruso" (Lucio Dalla)	1st	1
26	Aiello	Vegas Jones	"Gianna" (Rino Gaetano)	22nd	25

=== Fourth evening ===
The twenty-six Big Artists performed their songs once again, and the winner of the Newcomers' section was decided.

==== Big Artists ====
R/O	Artist	Song	Votes	Place
R/O	Artist	Song	Press Jury	Place
1	Annalisa	"Dieci"	17th	4
2	Aiello	"Ora"	25th	26
3	Måneskin	"Zitti e buoni"	2nd	5
4	Noemi	"Glicine"	6th	10
5	Orietta Berti	"Quando ti sei innamorato"	12th	12
6	Colapesce & Dimartino	"Musica leggerissima"	1st	8
7	Max Gazzè	"Il farmacista"	14th	14
8	Willie Peyote	"Mai dire mai (La locura)"	3rd	2
9	Malika Ayane	"Ti piaci così"	9th	9
10	La Rappresentante di Lista	"Amare"	4th	7
11	Madame	"Voce"	10th	18
12	Arisa	"Potevi fare di più"	7th	3
13	Coma_Cose	"Fiamme negli occhi"	13th	22
14	Fasma	"Parlami"	21st	19
15	Lo Stato Sociale	"Combat pop"	15th	11
16	Francesca Michielin & Fedez	"Chiamami per nome"	11th	17
17	Irama	"La genesi del tuo colore"	8th	6
18	Extraliscio feat. Davide Toffolo	"Bianca luce nera"	18th	13
19	Ghemon	"Momento perfetto"	19th	20
20	Francesco Renga	"Quando trovo te"	22nd	21
21	Gio Evan	"Arnica"	24th	23
22	Ermal Meta	"Un millione di cose da dirti"	5th	1
23	Bugo	"E invece sì"	23rd	24
24	Fulminacci	"Santa Marinella"	16th	15
25	Gaia	"Cuore amaro"	20th	16
26	Random	"Torno a te"	26th	25

==== Newcomers ====
Winner

R/O	Artist	Song	Votes				Place
R/O	Artist	Song	Demoscopic Jury (weight 33%)	Press Jury (weight 33%)	Public (weight 34%)	Average	Place
1	Davide Shorty	"Regina"	24.23%	24.96%	27.07%	25.44%	2nd
2	Folcast	"Scopriti"	24.16%	24.74%	23.36%	24.08%	3rd
3	Gaudiano	"Polvere da sparo"	25.83%	24.56%	33.46%	28.01%	1st
4	Wrongonyou	"Lezione di volo"	25.78%	25.74%	16.12%	22.48%	4th

=== Fifth evening ===
The twenty-six Big Artists performed their entry for a final time. The top three songs moved on to the superfinal, which decided the winner of Sanremo 2021.

Advanced to superfinal

R/O	Artist	Song	Votes			Place
R/O	Artist	Song	Televote	Place	Average	Place
1	Ghemon	"Momento perfetto"	1.13%	20th	3.01%	21
2	Gaia	"Cuore amaro"	1.12%	22nd	3.16%	19
3	Irama	"La genesi del tuo colore"	7.74%	5th	5.10%	5
4	Gio Evan	"Arnica"	1.01%	23rd	2.59%	23
5	Ermal Meta	"Un millione di cose da dirti"	8.48%	3rd	5.60%	3
6	Fulminacci	"Santa Marinella"	1.74%	15th	3.36%	16
7	Francesco Renga	"Quando trovo te"	1.12%	21st	2.87%	22
8	Extraliscio feat. Davide Toffolo	"Bianca luce nera"	2.29%	13th	3.60%	12
9	Colapesce & Dimartino	"Musica leggerissima"	8.10%	4th	5.14%	4
10	Malika Ayane	"Ti piaci così"	1.13%	19th	3.40%	15
11	Francesca Michielin & Fedez	"Chiamami per nome"	16.02%	1st	6.85%	1
12	Willie Peyote	"Mai dire mai (La locura)"	5.86%	6th	4.80%	6
13	Orietta Berti	"Quando ti sei innamorato"	4.05%	9th	4.10%	9
14	Arisa	"Potevi fare di più"	3.29%	10th	4.03%	10
15	Bugo	"E invece sì"	0.90%	24th	2.48%	24
16	Måneskin	"Zitti e buoni"	13.02%	2nd	6.45%	2
17	Madame	"Voce"	5.37%	7th	4.16%	8
18	La Rappresentante di Lista	"Amare"	2.68%	11th	3.80%	11
19	Annalisa	"Dieci"	4.72%	8th	4.38%	7
20	Coma_Cose	"Fiamme negli occhi"	2.67%	12th	3.09%	20
21	Lo Stato Sociale	"Combat pop"	1.79%	14th	3.53%	13
22	Random	"Torno a te"	0.45%	26th	2.23%	26
23	Max Gazzè	"Il farmacista"	0.66%	25th	3.16%	17
24	Noemi	"Glicine"	1.60%	17th	3.49%	14
25	Fasma	"Parlami"	1.69%	16th	3.16%	18
26	Aiello	"Ora"	1.38%	18th	2.45%	25

==== Superfinal ====
Winner
Runner-up
Third Place

R/O	Artist	Song	Votes				Place
R/O	Artist	Song	Demoscopic Jury (weight 33%)	Press Jury (weight 33%)	Public (weight 34%)	Average	Place
1	Ermal Meta	"Un milione di cose da dirti"	33.89%	34.71%	18.21%	28.83%	3
2	Francesca Michielin & Fedez	"Chiamami per nome"	33.13%	30.13%	28.26%	30.49%	2
3	Måneskin	"Zitti e buoni"	32.97%	35.16%	53.53%	40.68%	1

== Special guests ==
The special guests of Sanremo Music Festival 2021 were:

- Singers / musicians: Achille Lauro, Boss Doms, Alessandra Amoroso, Andrea Morricone, Banda musicale della Polizia di Stato, Banda musicale della Marina Militare, Bottari di Portico, Emma Marrone, Gigi D'Alessio, Enzo Dong, Enzo Avitabile, Mahmood, Fausto Leali, Diodato, Dardust, Francesco Gabbani, Gigliola Cinquetti, Il Volo, Ivan Granatino, Lele Blade, Max D'Ambra, Laura Pausini, Loredana Bertè, Marcella Bella, Negramaro, Michele Zarrillo, Paolo Vallesi, Riccardo Fogli, Samurai Jay, Stefano di Battista, Tecla Insolia, Olga Zakharova, Ornella Vanoni, Umberto Tozzi.
- Actors / comedians / directors / models: Claudio Santamaria, Francesca Barra, Valeria Fabrizi, Antonella Ferrari, Monica Guerritore, Matilde Gioli, Serena Rossi.
- Sports people: Alberto Tomba, Federica Pellegrini, Zlatan Ibrahimović, Siniša Mihajlović, Donato Grande, Cristiana Girelli, Alex Schwazer.
- Other persons or notable figures: Alessia Bonari, Giacomo Castellana, Urban Theory.

== Broadcast and ratings ==
=== Local broadcast ===
Rai 1 and Rai Radio 2 brings the official broadcasts of the festival in Italy. The five evenings were also streamed online via the broadcaster's official website RaiPlay.

==== Ratings Sanremo Music Festival 2021 ====
The audience is referred to that of Rai 1.

Live Show	Timeslot (UTC+1)	Date	Part One (9.00pm - 0.00am)		Part Two (0.00am - 1.30am)		Overall audience	
Live Show	Timeslot (UTC+1)	Date	Viewers	Share (%)	Viewers	Share (%)	Viewers	Share (%)
1st	9:00 pm	March 2	11,176,000	46.35	4,212,000	47.77	8,363,000	46.60
2nd	9:00 pm	March 3	10,113,000	41.21	3,966,000	45.70	7,586,000	42.10
3rd	9:00 pm	March 4	10,596,000	42.40	4,369,000	50.56	7,653,000	44.30
4th	9:00 pm	March 5	11,115,000	43.30	4,980,000	48.20	8,014,000	44.70
5th	9:00 pm	March 6	13,203,000	49.90	7,730,000	62.50	10,715,000	53.50

=== International broadcast ===
The international television service Rai Italia broadcast the competition in the Americas, Africa, Asia, Australia and Europe.

== See also ==
- Italy in the Eurovision Song Contest 2021
