= Adventures Italian Style =

2020 Italian comedy-drama film

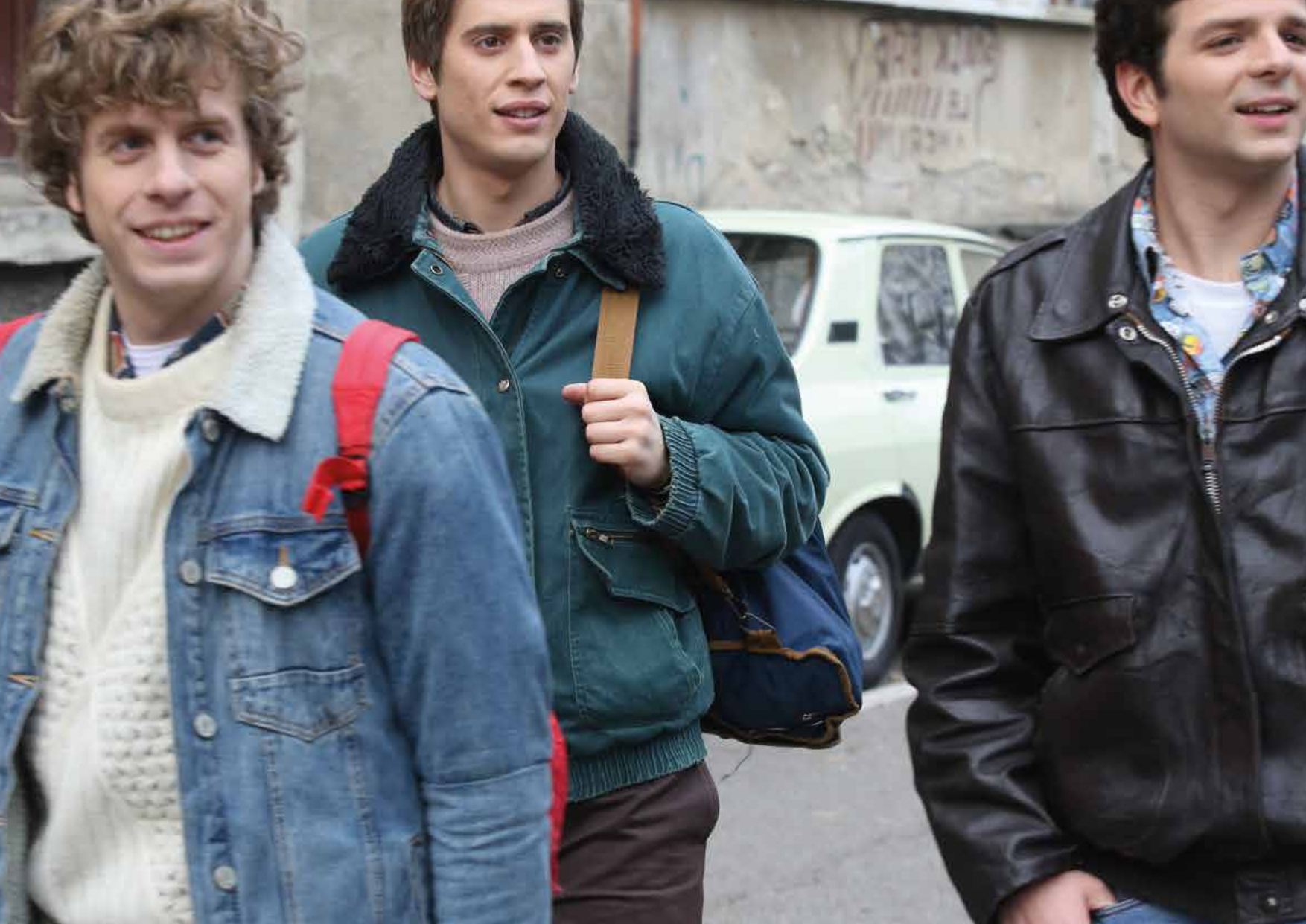
- Left to right: Lodo Guenzi, Matteo Gatta and Jacopo Costantini
- Italian: Est - Dittatura Last Minute
- Directed by: Antonio Pisu
- Written by: Maurizio Paganelli (story); Andrea Riceputi (story); Antonio Pisu
- Starring: Lodo Guenzi; Jacopo Costantini; Matteo Gatta; Paolo Rossi Pisu
- Cinematography: Adrian Silisteanu
- Edited by: Paolo Marzoni
- Music by: Davide Caprelli
- Production company: Genoma Films
- Distributed by: Genoma Films
- Release date: 30 September 2020 (Venice Film Festival)
- Country: Italy
- Language: Italian

Adventures Italian Style (Italian: Est - Dittatura Last Minute, lit. 'East: Last Minute Dictatorship') is a 2020 Italian comedy-drama film directed by Antonio Pisu, starring Lodo Guenzi, Jacopo Costantini, Matteo Gatta, and Paolo Rossi Pisu.

The film based on the short story Addio Ceaușescu ('Goodbye Ceaușescu') by Maurizio Paganelli and Andrea Riceputi. It premiered at the Venice Nights' panel of the Giornate degli Autori section of the 77th Venice International Film Festival. It also won awards at the New York International Film Awards.

A sequel, Adventures Italian Style: Reloaded, was released in 2025.

== Cast ==
- Lodo Guenzi as Rice
- Jacopo Costantini as Bibi
- Matteo Gatta as Pago
- Paolo Rossi Pisu as Girolamo
- Ana Ciontea as Costelia
- Ioana Flora as Andra
- Liviu Cheloiu as Emil
- Ada Condeescu as Simona
- Eva Isis Popovici as Adina
- Julieta Szönyi as the singer
- Beatrice Balzani as Silvia
- Sofia Longhini as Lara
- Manuela Ciucur as Simona's mother
