= Ghemon =

Italian rapper and singer-songwriter (born 1982)

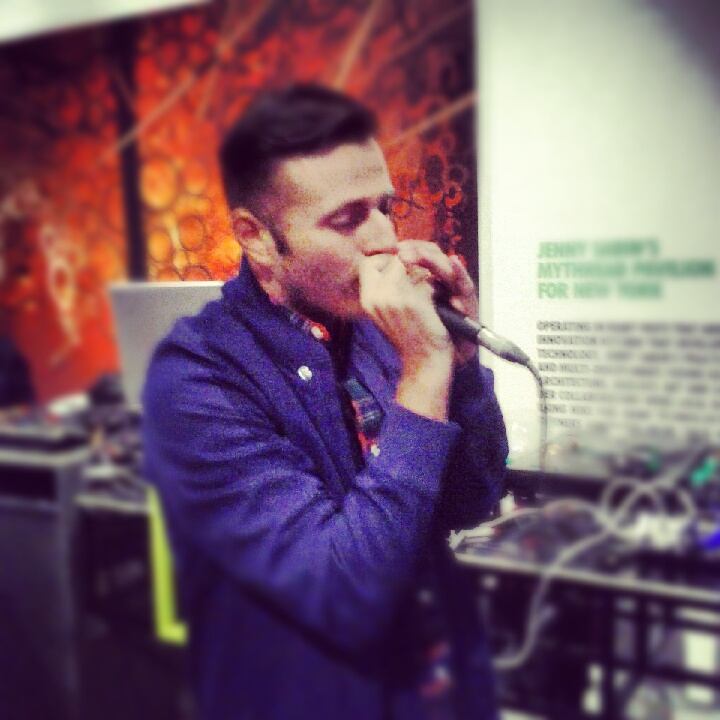

Background information
- Born: Giovanni Luca Picariello; 1 April 1982 (age 44); Avellino, Campania, Italy
- Genres: Conscious hip hop, pop
- Occupations: Rapper, singer-songwriter
- Years active: 1996–present

Giovanni Luca Picariello (born in Avellino, 1 April 1982), known professionally as Ghemon (Italian pronunciation: [ˈɡɛːmon]), is an Italian rapper, singer-songwriter, and comedian.

He is also known as Ghemon Scienz and Gilmar. He was part of the Blue Nox and Unlimited Struggle collectives.

His stage name is a tribute to the character Ishikawa Goemon XIII from Monkey Punch's manga series Lupin the Third. His debut album La rivincita dei buoni was released in 2007. In 2017 his single "Adesso sono qui" was included in the soundtrack of the videogame NBA 2K17.

Ghemon participated at the Sanremo Music Festival 2019 with the song "Rose viola" and at the Sanremo Music Festival 2021 with "Momento perfetto".

== Biography ==
=== Adolescence and early work ===
The first encounter with hip hop culture came in 1995, when Ghemon became interested in graffiti, a passion he would later abandon in 2001. In the graffiti scene he first used the name Kal (the tag was suggested to him by Mobie, his partner in the collective "Kella Cessa 'e Soreta" (KCS), later renamed "Vandalos"), but because of the strong similarity between his tag and that of the Neapolitan graffiti writer Kaf, who was very active in that period, he was forced to change his name to Esimo (abbreviated to Esi).

Picariello, thanks to his cousin who the previous year had recommended that he listen to Litfiba and Ligabue, of whom he became a great fan, discovered hip hop in 1993, becoming interested in "Tocca qui" by Articolo 31 and "Quando meno te l'aspetti (come una bomba)" by OTR. The rapper from Irpinia would later recall, in the track "Giorno dopo giorno" from Mr. Phil's album Guerra fra poveri (2006), with the phrase "i miei primi testi fake, copiavo J-Ax" ("my first fake lyrics, I copied J-Ax"), that at the time he enjoyed "dismantling" Articolo 31's lyrics by changing the words. The name adopted for his music career, Ghemon, is inspired by that of the character from Lupin III, Goemon Ishikawa XIII.

Soon afterwards he discovered Venerdì rappa (later turned into One-Two One-Two), a radio programme created and hosted by Albertino, which promoted Italian hip hop by giving wide visibility and popularity to numerous artists, including Neffa, Esa, Sottotono, La Pina, and Articolo 31.

In 1996 he joined 15 barrato, a group founded by his friend Mobie, named after a city bus and whose lyrics were written in the Irpinian dialect; after a short time Ghemon left it to found, in 1997 with his friend Domenico (known as Domi or Domey Blanco), the Sangamaro project, in which Picariello resumed writing in Italian. The two met after Gianluca, in a record store, read a notice from a certain Domenico looking for someone to form a hip hop group; despite Picariello's parents opposing their relationship because of the large age difference between him and Domi, they began working together and later released, in 2000, the demo Bloodstains, which received positive reviews from Aelle, then a leading specialist publication, which described it as one of the most interesting works of that year. Also in 2000, in a moment of audacity after attending the Maurizio Costanzo Show with students from his school, Ghemon donated a copy of Bloodstains on cassette to Matia Bazar.

In 1999 the rapper had a Japanese word tattooed on his right shoulder, translatable as "to know, to be"; from this tattoo came the idea of adding "Scienz" to his stage name.

=== The Soulville project ===
In 2002 Picariello moved to Rome, where he obtained a degree in law at LUISS University. Acclimating to the chaotic nature of the city was not easy for the rapper from Avellino, who would address themes of living away from home and distance from his hometown in the track "La politica del tempo (Johnny)", included on the album La rivincita dei buoni (2007). Later Ghemon, in an interview, would describe Rome as "dispersiva" ("dispersive"), given how huge it is, and explained that the difficult adjustment was compounded by the need to build a social circle from scratch.

The Sangamaro group lasted a few more years: four tracks were recorded, of which no trace remains, and not long after the duo split up.

In March 2005 Ghemon joined Soulville, a music and record project musically tied to soul and often addressing conscious hip hop themes, thus closer in style to Common and Blackalicious than to the gangsta rap of Tupac Shakur and 50 Cent. In this period Picariello took part in various compilations, and many artists, such as Mr. Phil, relied on Ghemon's abilities in numerous collaborations. In 2006 Soulville released as a free download the rapper's debut EP, titled Ufficio immaginazione, which received considerable acclaim from both critics and the public, who appreciated the refined and original lyrics, always handled with a clear and precise style, reaching more than 3,000 digital downloads (2,700 in less than a year). After the summer of the same year Ghemon left the Soulville project to continue his music career independently.

=== Qualcosa cambierà Mixtape and La rivincita dei buoni ===
In March 2007 the mixtape Qualcosa cambierà Mixtape was released, self-produced and self-distributed, mixed by DJ Fester Tarantino (a member of Gente de Borgata). The mixtape, which anticipated the release of La rivincita dei buoni, features collaborations with rappers and record producers already established in the national and international scene; moreover, of the 20 tracks on the record only 11 are previously unreleased.

A few months after the mixtape's release, the first studio album La rivincita dei buoni was released, distributed by The Saifam Group. The record confirmed the success achieved with Qualcosa cambierà and underlined the stylistic difference, already evident in earlier work, that has always distinguished Ghemon from other rappers in the Italian hip hop scene.

The impact of the two albums was very positive: as a result, Ghemon was awarded on 24 November 2007 in Faenza by the Italian magazine Basement Magazine as Hip Hop Brand New Artist 2007 at the tenth edition of the Meeting delle etichette indipendenti.

=== Cuore + pistola and other activities ===
On 5 May 2008 Ghemon announced his intention to create a concept EP in collaboration with Macro Marco. The project was to be titled Cuore + pistola and would depart from classic hip hop conventions by using beats without drums, bass or synthesizer sounds (only those already present in the sample would be used), meaning the rapper would rap over the sounds of the original sample. Although a track ("Splende in eterno") had already been made available on Myspace, on 7 July 2008 Ghemon informed his fans, again via his blog, that the EP would be postponed temporarily, promising that a big surprise would soon arrive (most likely Ghemon was alluding to the 2009 record E poi, all'improvviso, impazzire).

In 2008 Ghemon took part in the production of the music CD attached to the book Renegades of Funk by u.net. The work's title is a homage to the single of the same name by Afrika Bambaataa, and retraces the early days of hip hop culture, which developed on the streets of the Bronx in the first half of the 1970s. Ghemon created, in collaboration with Kiave, DJ Lugi and Macro Marco, the track "Peace Unity & Having Fun", whose title is another homage to Afrika Bambaataa, as it represents – in part, since the complete phrase is actually "Peace, unity, love, and having fun" – the refrain of the track "Unity" (made by the U.S. rapper together with James Brown).

=== Ghemon and The Love 4tet ===
After the interruption of the EP Cuore + pistola, Ghemon devoted himself to a new project in collaboration with the disc jockey Tsura, who often accompanied him at concerts, and the producer Fid Mella, who had already worked with Ghemon producing some of the beats on Qualcosa cambierà Mixtape and La rivincita dei buoni. The trio, which took the name "Ghemon & The Love 4tet", produced 32 tracks, 23 of which were included on the album E poi, all'improvviso, impazzire, the group's only album. Some of the discarded tracks were later made public, while others remain unreleased.

In September 2008, through his blog, Ghemon launched a photo contest (lasting three weeks) in which each participant would submit a photograph, hoping the trio would choose it for the album cover. However, the proposed images did not satisfy Ghemon & The Love 4tet, and in the end the photo used for the cover was kindly provided by the photographer Piero Marsili Libelli.

Expected for January and released on 18 February 2009, E poi, all'improvviso, impazzire is a concept album whose themes focus mainly on love in a broad sense, interpersonal relationships, and relations with the female world; it represents yet another confirmation of Ghemon's atypical talent, once again evident in his emotional and never banal lyrics about the rapper's experiences and reflections. The performances by Fid Mella and the various artists who collaborated on the record are also considered distinctive, from DJ Tsura to members of Blue Nox – among whom the singer Hyst stands out – from Brenk and his sampler to Augusto Pallocca and his saxophone. The website Rockit.it judged it "un album pressoché perfetto" ("an almost perfect album"), highlighting "produzioni ricercate e pulite, metriche ben costruite e testi che racchiudono l'essenza di una generazione" ("refined and clean productions, well-built metrics, and lyrics that capture the essence of a generation").

The title of the record alludes to the many tracks produced in a short span of time, and Ghemon explained in an interview that if he had not used music as therapy he would, indeed, have "gone crazy".

=== 2009–2011: Projects and collaborations ===
During 2009 Ghemon was busy with various concerts around Italy. In the same period the Blue Nox (or Blue-Nox) collective was founded; in addition to Ghemon, its members include Kiave, DJ Impro, Hyst, Mecna, Negrè, Rafe and Macro Marco. The organisation operates through a blog, officially opened on 8 June 2009 (although some posts are dated 7 June 2009), where members publish news related to music (theirs and otherwise), cinema, graphic design and more. The site allows readers to consult dates of upcoming live events by the collective or its individual members and, in "Downloads", to download various EPs and singles by the group members; it is precisely in this latter section that some of Ghemon's works can be found. These include, in addition to Ufficio immaginazione, the EP Embrionale and two unreleased tracks credited to Ghemon & The Can't Fuck with This, distributed for free on 18 February 2010 through Ghemon's official site and that of Blue Nox. The two tracks depart from the typical hip hop style: both "G-H-E-M-O-N" (described as "a jam, an improvisation of the 'first take is good' kind") and "Traccia #2", a spoken word piece, are fully performed tracks, in which the sampling technique was therefore not used; in the second track Ghemon collaborates with trumpeter Luca Aquino. Both tracks were produced by Fid Mella.

In January 2010 he released the video for "Goccia a goccia" with Al Castellana, taken from E poi, all'improvviso, impazzire. In the same year Ghemon undertook a substantial amount of live activity around Italy and at the same time began weekly hosting of his own radio programme, called Radio Fantasma, on iTunes's black-music station Supreme Radio.

On 23 April 2010 the EP Embrionale was released, a tribute to U.S. composer Jon Brion. The work was described as "un'incredibile perizia stilistica nella ricerca dei suoni che sembra scomparire una volta che il testo si chiude nella sintassi della superficie" ("an incredible stylistic expertise in the search for sounds that seems to disappear once the text closes itself within surface syntax"); it, judged anomalous, consists of seven tracks, in which the samples are quite clear because they lack arrangements, basslines and 4/4 drum loops, all characteristic elements of hip hop. Embrionale, after the addition of three bonus tracks, was then distributed as a physical copy in a limited, numbered edition of 300 copies.

=== Qualcosa è cambiato – Qualcosa cambierà Vol. 2 ===
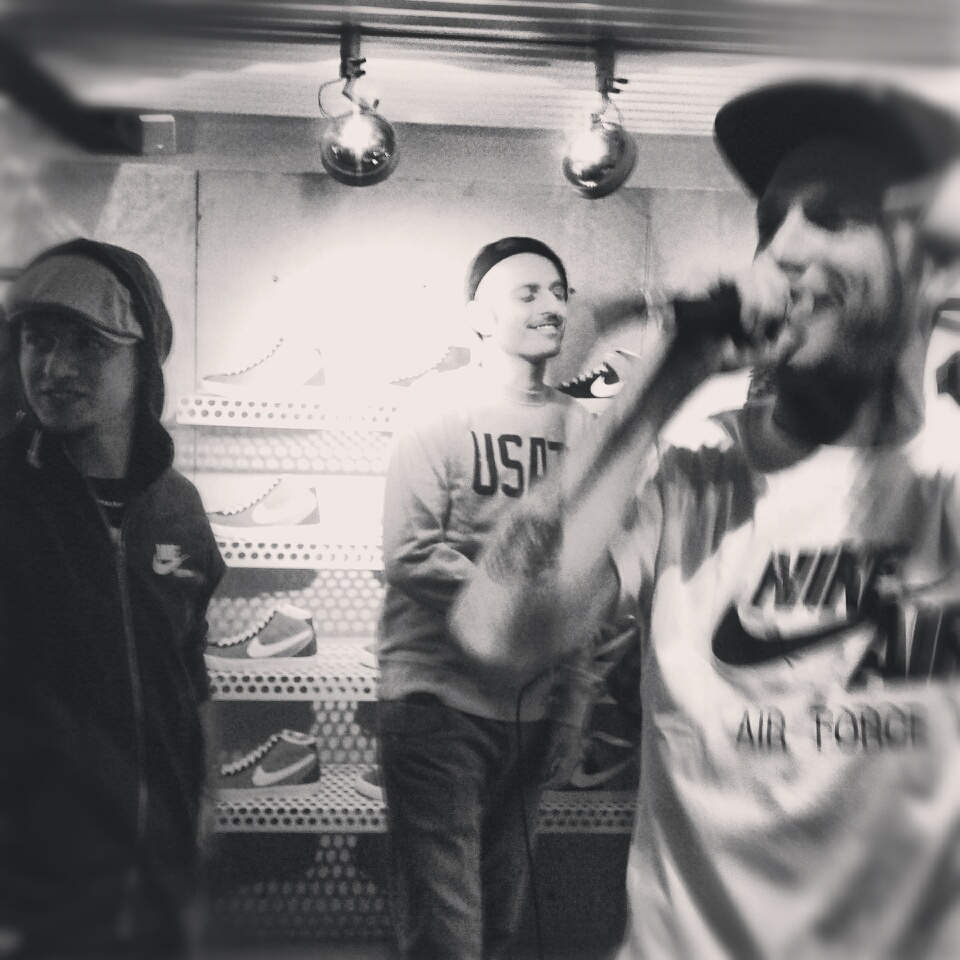
Kiave, Ghemon and Clementino.

On 25 January 2012 the third album Qualcosa è cambiato - Qualcosa cambierà Vol. 2 was released, a sequel to the mixtape Qualcosa cambierà Mixtape (2007). After the mixtape's release, Ghemon announced the album 440/Scritto nelle stelle, described by him as the last official record entirely rap; he said he had decided to withdraw from the hip hop scene, while stating he did not want to abandon music because he considered it his primary form of expression. The album's release, however, appears to have been denied by the artist himself (albeit unofficially) in a tweet replying to a fan dated 25 March 2013. Later, on his Twitter profile, he revealed that the album "esce quando esce.." ("comes out when it comes out").

In July 2012 he duetted with Syria on the title track of the film Come non-detto, while in October of the same year he took part in the EP Per la mia gente - For My People together with Bassi Maestro and the New York beatmaker Marco Polo. The EP was very successful and took Ghemon on a long tour across Italy in an unusual formation with Bassi Maestro on the mic and Marco Polo as DJ. In the same month Fabri Fibra decided to collaborate with Ghemon on the track "Teoria e pratica RMX", which also features Mecna; the track anticipated the release of Fabri Fibra's EP Casus belli EP.

=== Orchidee ===
In June 2013 Ghemon collaborated with Neffa on an alternative version of Dove sei, included as a digital bonus track on Neffa's album Molto calmo. On 4 August of the same year, the rapper announced via his Twitter profile the title of his third solo album, Orchidee, while on 11 December he made available digitally the compilation Aspetta un minuto, consisting of unreleased tracks and others recorded between 2006 and 2012.

In May 2014 Ghemon revealed the release date for Orchidee, set for 27 May of the same year. At the same time the lead single Adesso sono qui was announced, also promoted by a music video.

=== Mezzanotte and the Sanremo Music Festival ===
On 22 September 2017 Ghemon released his fourth studio album, Mezzanotte, whose main theme is depression affecting the artist in January 2016, from which he recovered in May 2019 thanks to drug therapy.

On 8 March 2018 his first autobiography, Io sono. Diario anticonformista di tutte le volte che ho cambiato pelle, was released.

In 2019 Ghemon took part in the 69th Sanremo Music Festival with the song Rose viola, finishing twelfth.

=== Scritto nelle stelle and E vissero feriti e contenti ===
In December 2019 Ghemon revealed the release date of his fifth studio album Scritto nelle stelle, in which love is the predominant theme in many songs. Announced for 20 March 2020, the record was released on 24 April due to the COVID-19 pandemic. According to the artist, it is the record "nel quale maggiormente son riuscito a creare una ricetta personale nella quale però è possibile riconoscere le spezie con il quale è stato composto" ("in which I most managed to create a personal recipe in which it is still possible to recognize the spices it is made of"). From November 2020 he served as narrator for the second season of the podcast Certified Classics, replacing Dargen D'Amico.

In 2021 he took part in the 71st Sanremo Music Festival with the song Momento perfetto, finishing twenty-first in the final evening. On 19 March his sixth album E vissero feriti e contenti was released.

== Discography ==
=== Studio albums ===
- La rivincita dei buoni (2007)
- E poi, all'improvviso, impazzire (2009) (with Ghemon & The Love 4tet)
- Qualcosa è cambiato – Qualcosa cambierà Vol. 2 (2012)
- Orchidee (2014)
- Mezzanotte (2017)
- Scritto nelle stelle (2020)
- E vissero feriti e contenti (2021)

== Awards ==
- 2015 – Meeting of Independent Labels (MEI) – Best independent hip hop artist

== See also ==
- Kiave
- Mecna
