= Gaudiano =

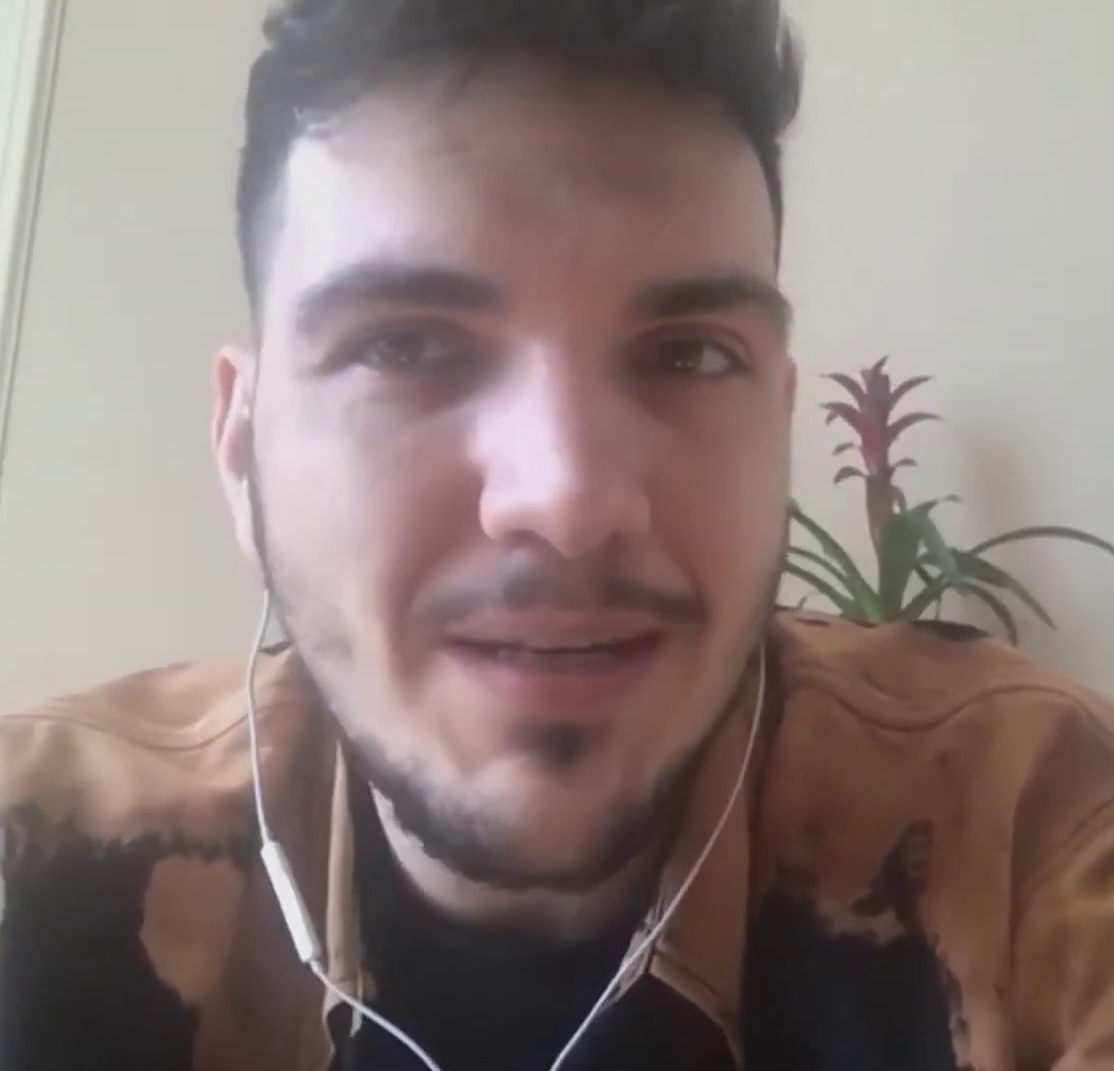

Background information
- Born: Luca Gaudiano; 3 December 1991 (age 34); Foggia, Apulia, Italy
- Genres: Pop
- Occupations: Singer, songwriter
- Years active: 2016–present
- Label: Sony Music

Luca Gaudiano (born 3 December 1991), known simply as Gaudiano, is an Italian singer-songwriter.

He competed and won at the "Newcomers" section of the Sanremo Music Festival 2021, with the song "Polvere da sparo".

In 2023, he won Tale e quale show on Rai 1, the Italian adaptation of Your Face Sounds Familiar.

== Discography ==
=== Studio albums ===
- L'ultimo fiore (2022)

=== Singles ===
- "Le cose inutili" (2020)
- "Acqua per occhi rossi" (2020)
- "Polvere da sparo" (2020)
- "Rimani" (2021)
- "Oltre le onde" (2022)
- "100 kg di piume" (2022)
- "L'ultimo fiore" (2022)
