= Beatrice Venezi =

Italian conductor and pianist (born 1990)

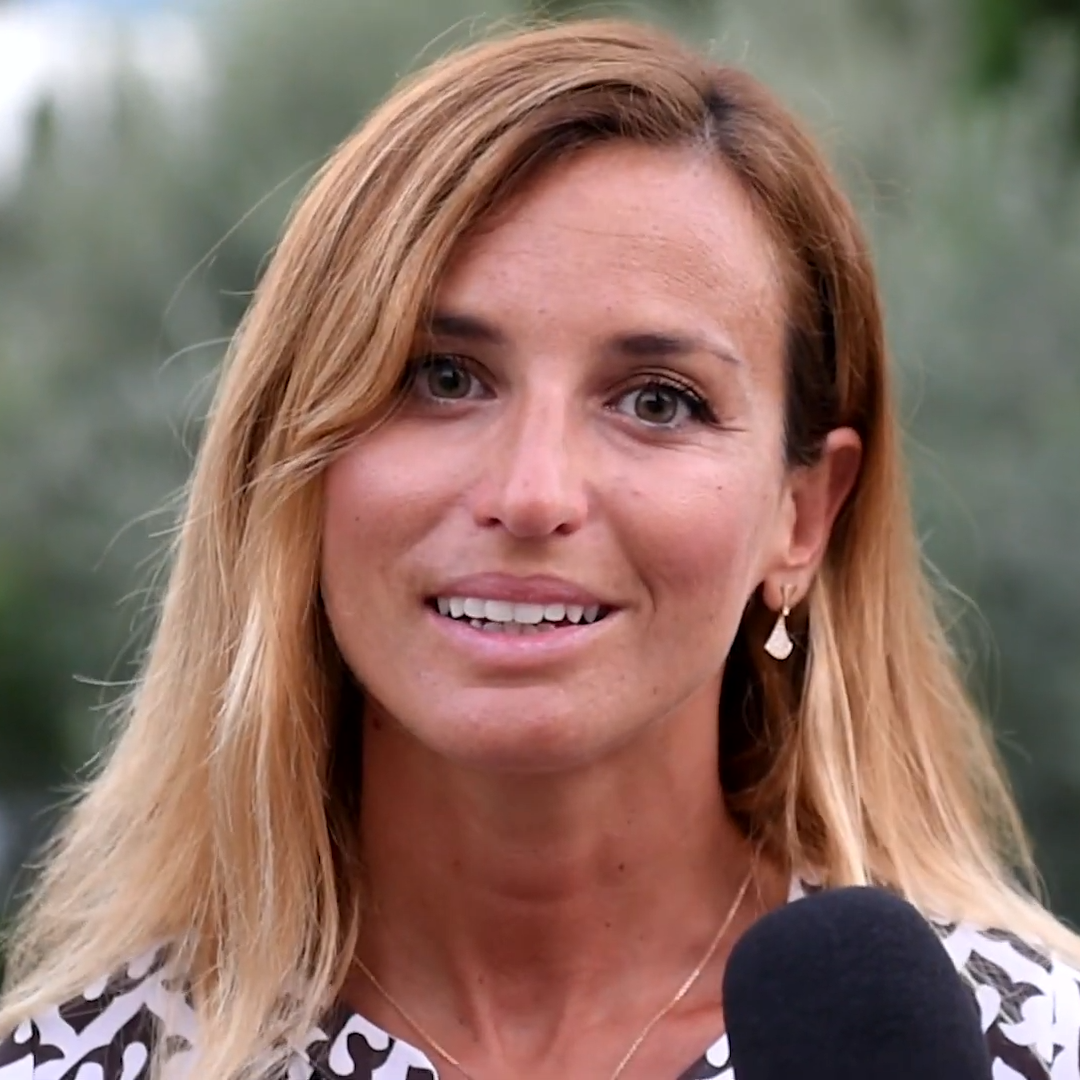
- Born: March 5, 1990 (age 36); Lucca, Italy
- Education: Giuseppe Verdi Conservatory, Milan
- Occupation: conductor and pianist

Beatrice Venezi (born March 5, 1990) is an Italian conductor and pianist.

== Biography ==
Beatrice Venezi was born in Lucca, Italy, in 1990. In 2015, she graduated in orchestral conducting from the Giuseppe Verdi Conservatory in Milan. She continued her studies in musicology, and her first essay was published in the prestigious journal Codice 602 under the title "Gaetano Giani Luporini: The Inner Necessity of Art". In 2005, she won the first prize at the Italian National Piano Competition and began collaborating with national and international orchestras. The next year, she won the first prize at the Luigi Zanuccoli Young Musicians Award.

At the age of only 22, Venezi became a conductor. She was Assistant Conductor of the Armenian State Youth Symphony Orchestra, Principal Conductor of the Milano Classica Orchestra, Guest Conductor of the Orchestra della Toscana. In 2016, she was appointed Principal Director of the Nuova Orchestra Scarlatti Young.

In 2019, she released her first album, titled My Journey - Puccini's Symphonic Works.

In 2021, she co-hosted Sanremo music festival.

In 2021, she received the Atreju21 award at the Atreju festival of the Fratelli d'Italia political party.

== Controversy ==
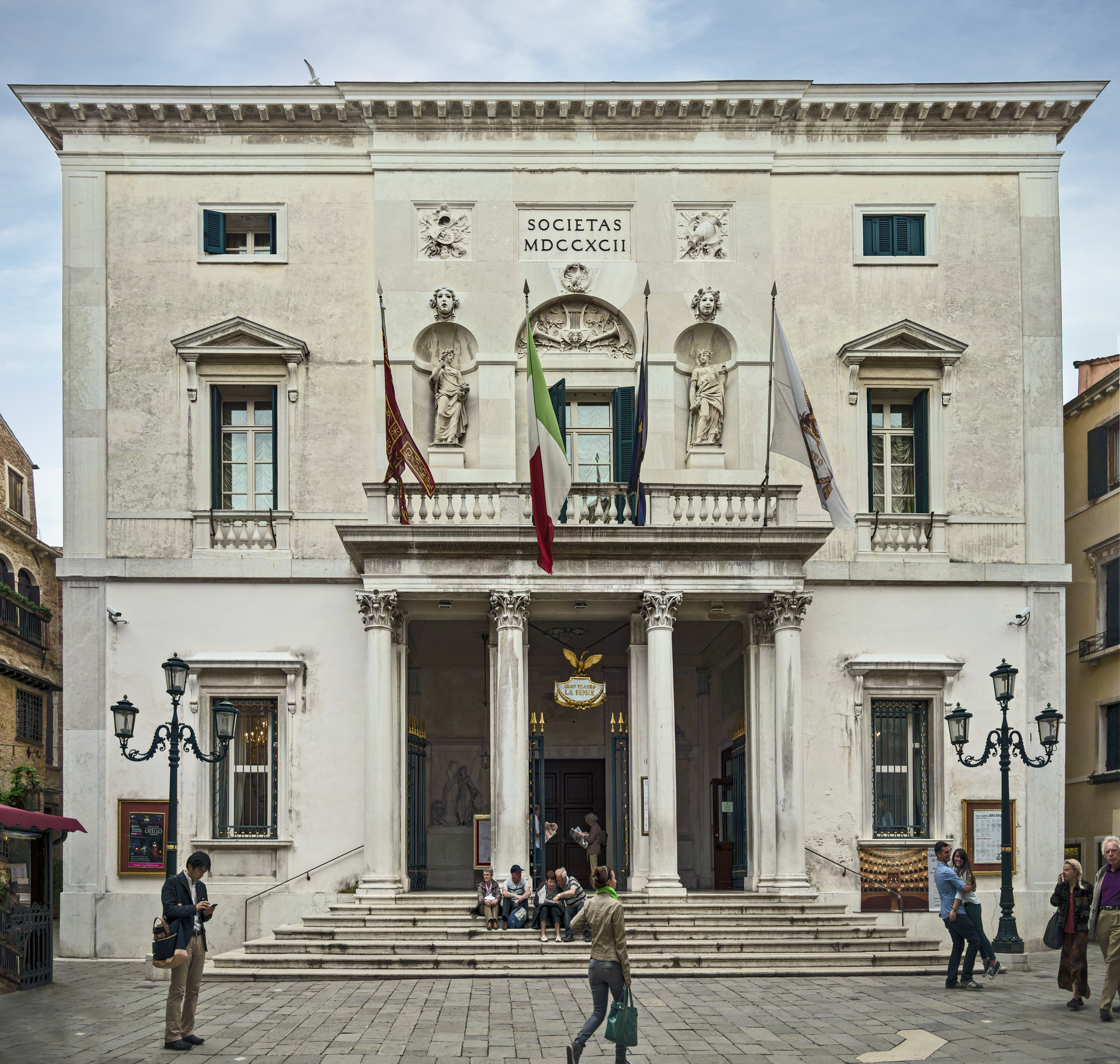
Teatro La Fenice in Venice

Venezi is known in Italy for her proximity to the government of Giorgia Meloni. Her father Gabriele Venezi is a former member of Forza Nuova, a far-right political party. On the 17th of November, 2022, Venezi was appointed Music Advisor by the Italian Minister of Culture, Gennaro Sangiuliano. In the same year, she was appointed artistic director of the Taormina Arte Foundation by the Sicilian Regional Government.

Venezi was supposed to conduct the 2024 New Year's concert in Nice, but in July 2023, anti-fascist groups in Nice staged a huge protest, calling on the municipality and the city's opera house to cancel the concert.

On September 23, 2025, she was appointed Music Director of La Fenice, one of the most famous Italian opera venues. Its staff members opposed the appointment, pointing out that Venezi lacks experience and has never before conducted at La Fenice, except for a short promo event. The Mayor of Venice, Luigi Brugnaro, claimed that "there was pressure from Rome for the appointment".

On April 26, 2026, La Fenice announced that it had cancelled all future collaborations with Venezi, following remarks she made in an interview with Argentine newspaper La Nación. In the interview, Venezi criticised the structure of Italian orchestras, alleging a lack of meritocracy and referring to what she described as systems of nepotism and entrenched internal dynamics within publicly funded institutions. Her comments prompted criticism from members of the orchestra and staff. The foundation subsequently stated that her remarks were incompatible with its institutional values and respect for its musicians. The move ended the planned collaboration before her tenure as music director was due to begin.

== Awards ==
- 2005 – First Prize at the Italian National Piano Competition "R. Zucchi".
- 2006 – Luigi Zanuccoli Young Musicians Award.
- 2017 – Woman of the Year by Corriere della Sera.
- 2017 – Scala D'Oro by the Lions Club Milano alla Scala.
- 2018 – Forbes 100 under 30 Italia award.
- 2019 – Leonia award.
- 2021 – Premio Pegaso by the Tuscany Region.
