= Lodo Guenzi =

Italian singer and actor (born 1986)

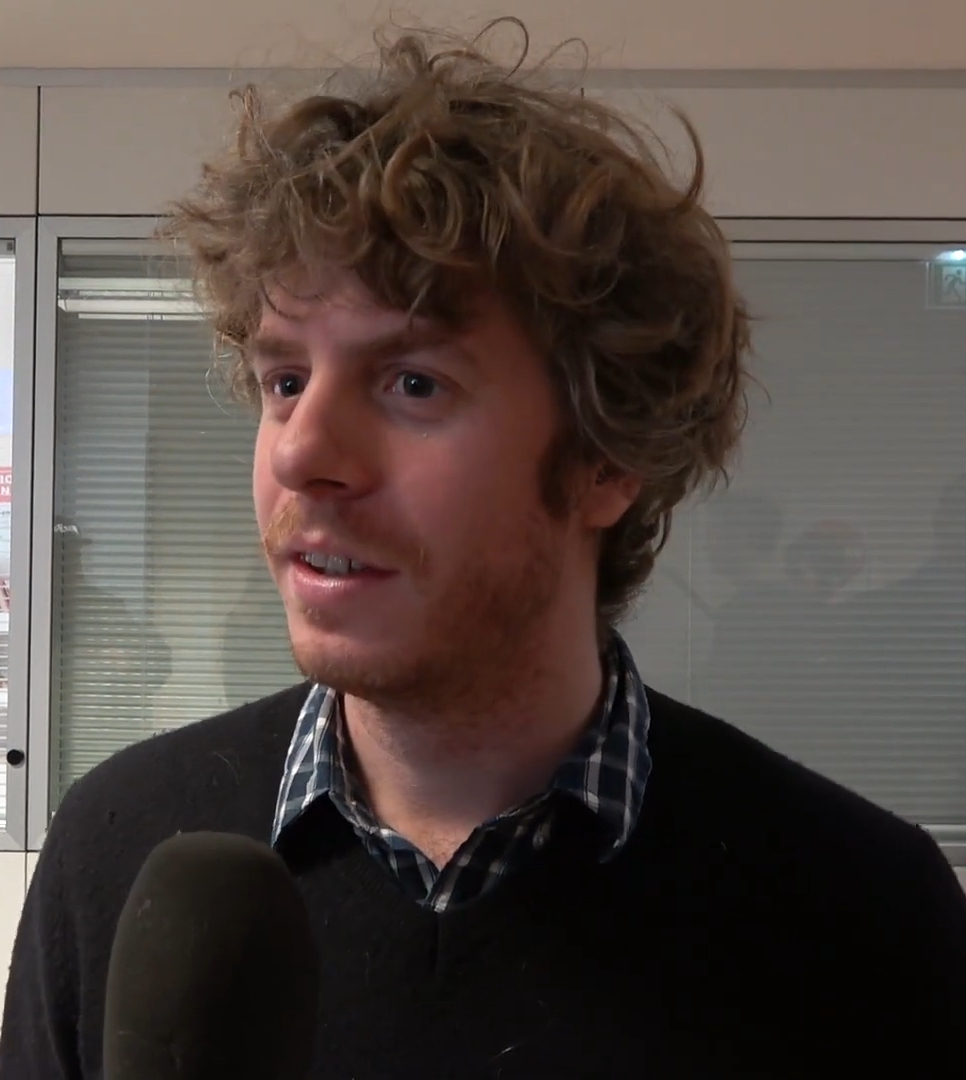
- Guenzi in 2019

Background information
- Born: Lodovico Guenzi; 1 July 1986 (age 39); Bologna, Italy
- Genres: Indie rock; indie pop
- Occupations: Singer; songwriter; actor
- Years active: 2009–present
- Formerly of: Lo Stato Sociale

Lodovico "Lodo" Guenzi (Italian pronunciation: [lodoˈviːko ˈlɔːdo ˈɡwɛntsi]; born 1 July 1986) is an Italian singer, musician and actor, former member of the indie rock band Lo Stato Sociale.

== Early life and education ==
Guenzi was born in the Santo Stefano neighborhood of Bologna on 1 July 1986. His father, Alberto, is a professor of Economic History at the University of Parma and director of the Department of Economics, while his mother is a judge.

He graduated from the Liceo Classico Galvani in Bologna and briefly moved to Udine to study acting at the Nico Pepe Academy of Dramatic Art.

== Career ==
=== Music career ===
Upon returning to Bologna, he decided to focus on music and began working as a DJ at the local radio station Radio Città Fujiko. At the radio station, he met Alberto Guidetti (Bebo) and Alberto Cazzola (Albi), and they formed the indie rock band Lo Stato Sociale in 2009. Guenzi, in addition to singing, also plays guitar, piano, and synthesizer. The trio, which later expanded to a quintet with Enrico Roberto and Francesco Draicchio, was noticed by the record label Garrincha Dischi, which produced their first album Turisti della democrazia in 2012.

The band achieved considerable success in Italy and released five more albums and several EPs. They performed multiple times at the Concerto del Primo Maggio, a televised concert promoted by Italian trade unions to celebrate the International Workers' Day, with Guenzi hosting it alongside Ambra Angiolini in 2018 and in 2019. In 2018, they placed second at the 68th Sanremo Music Festival with the song "Una vita in vacanza". That same year, Guenzi replaced Asia Argento as a judge in the twelfth edition of X Factor.

In 2021, they returned to the Sanremo Music Festival with "Combat Pop". In 2024, following the death of their manager and mentor Matteo Romagnoli, the group announced their disbandment.

=== Acting career ===
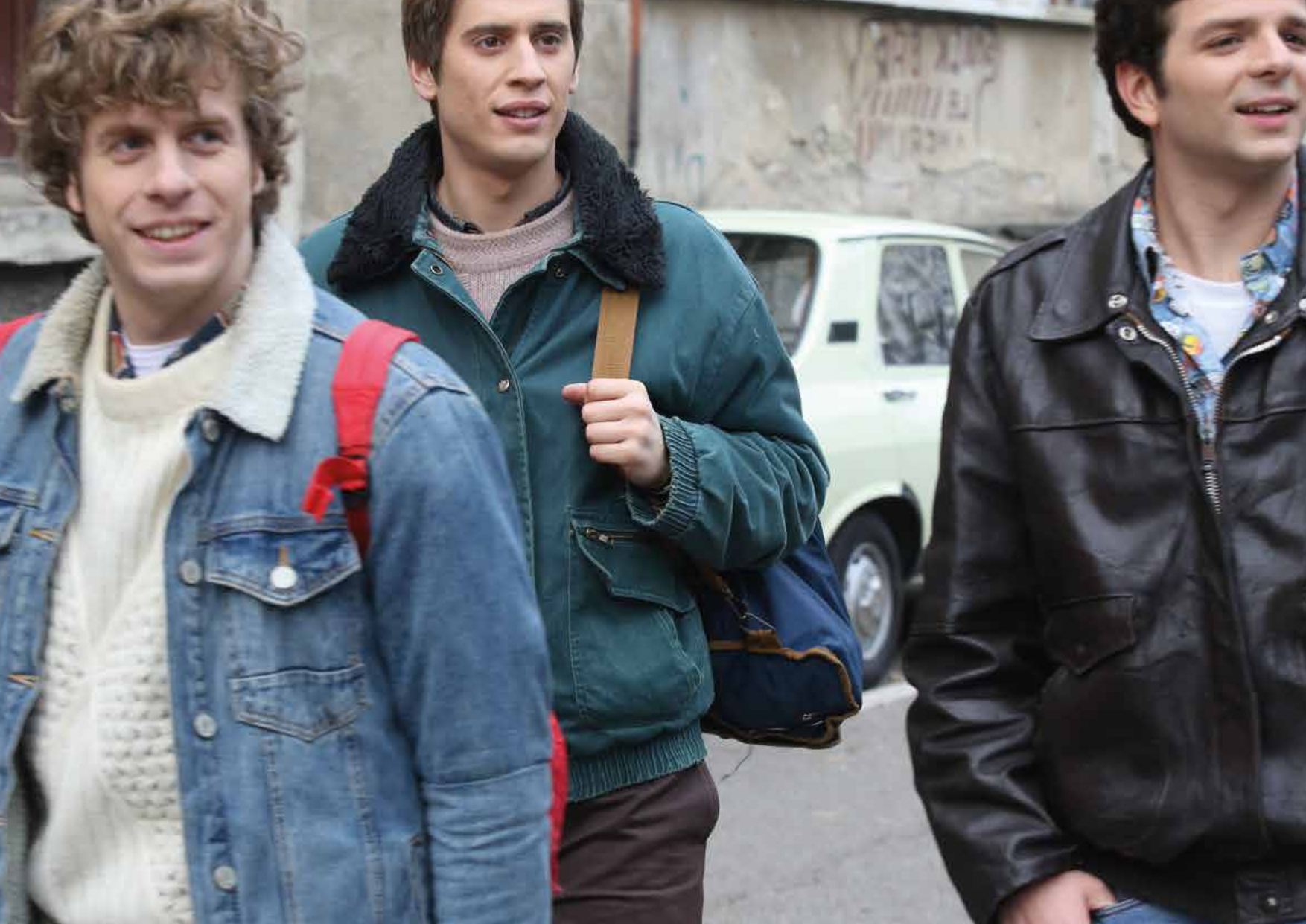
Guenzi (left) with Matteo Gatta (center) and Jacopo Costantini in Adventures Italian Style

In 2020, Guenzi made his acting debut with a leading role in the film Adventures Italian Style (Est - Dittatura Last Minute) by Antonio Pisu. In 2022, he starred in the comedy Il giorno più bello by Andrea Zalone, in the drama film La California by Cinzia Bomoll, and in the Amazon Christmas comedy Improvvisamente Natale by Francesco Patierno.

In 2023, he starred in the film The Fourteenth Sunday of Ordinary Time, directed by Pupi Avati. In 2025, he was part of Adventures Italian Style: Reloaded, the sequel to the 2020 movie.

== Discography ==
=== With Lo Stato Sociale ===
- Turisti della democrazia (2012)
- L'Italia peggiore (2014)
- Amore, lavoro e altri miti da sfatare (2017)
- Primati (2018)
- Lodo (EP, 2021)
- Attentato alla musica italiana (2021)
- Stupido sexy futuro (2023)

== Filmography ==
Film
Year	Title	Role	Notes
2020	Adventures Italian Style	Rice	Film debut
2021	Criminali si diventa	Arduino	
2022	Il giorno più bello	Billy	
2022	La California	Yuri	
2022	Improvvisamente Natale	Giacomo	
2023	Gaspare Spontini celeste amore	Gaspare Spontini	Documentary
2023	The Fourteenth Sunday of Ordinary Time	Young Marzio Barreca	
2025	Adventures Italian Style: Reloaded	Rice	

Television
Year	Title	Role	Notes
2023	I Hate Christmas	Bruno	Episode "Anyone Will Do"
2026–present	Imma Tataranni: Deputy Prosecutor	Edoardo Fossati	4 episodes
