= Aiello (singer) =

Italian singer (born 1985)

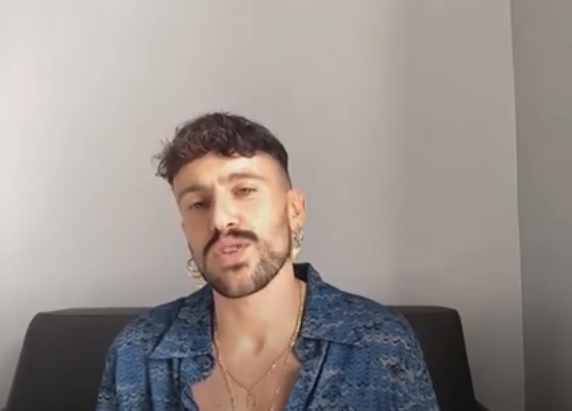
- Aiello (2021)

Background information
- Born: Antonio Aiello; 26 July 1985 (age 41); Cosenza, Calabria, Italy
- Genre: Indie pop
- Occupation: Singer
- Years active: 2011–present

Antonio Aiello (born 26 July 1985), simply known as Aiello, is an Italian singer.

== Career ==
He debuted in 2011 with the single "Riparo" and released his first extended play, Hi-Hello, in 2017.

On 27 September 2019, he released his first studio album Ex voto with label RCA Records. In 2020, his song "Festa" was included in the soundtrack of the film Bangla and was nominated for best original song at David di Donatello.

He participated at the Sanremo Music Festival 2021 with the song "Ora".

== Discography ==
=== Studio albums ===
- Ex voto (2019)
- Meridionale (2021)
- Romantico (2023) – No. 26 Italy

=== Extended plays ===
- Hi-Hello (2017)

=== Singles ===
- "Riparo" (2011)
- "Come stai" (2017)
- "Arsenico" (2017)
- "La mia ultima storia" (2019)
- "Il cielo di Roma" (2020)
- "Vienimi (a ballare)" (2020)
- "Che canzone siamo" (2020)
- "Ora" (2021)
- "Fino all'alba (ti sento)" (2021)
- "Paradiso" (2022)
- "Domani torno" (2022)
- "Aspettiamo mattina" (2023)
- "Talete" (2024)
- "Tutto sbagliato" (2024)
