= Fiamme negli occhi =

Single by Coma_Cose

from the album Nostralgia
- Released: 3 March 2021
- Genre: Indie pop
- Length: 3:26
- Label: Asian Fake
- Songwriters: Francesca California; Fausto Lama; Fabio Dalè; Carlo Frigerio
- Producer: Mamakass

Coma_Cose singles chronology
"Guerre fredde" (2020)	"Fiamme negli occhi" (2021)	"La canzone dei lupi" (2021)

"Fiamme negli occhi" (transl. “Flames in [your] eyes”) is a song by Italian musical duo Coma_Cose. It was written by band members Francesca California and Fausto Lama with Fabio Dalè and Carlo Frigerio and produced by Mamakass.

It was released by Asian Fake on 3 March 2021 as the lead single from the second studio album Nostralgia. The song was the duos entry for the Sanremo Music Festival 2021, the 71st edition of Italy's musical festival which doubles also as a selection of the act for Eurovision Song Contest, where it placed 20th in the grand final. "Fiamme negli occhi" peaked at number 6 on the Italian FIMI Singles Chart and was certified double platinum in Italy.

== Background ==
"Fiamme negli occhi" talks about overcoming obstacles in a romantic relationship and investigates the desire to take care of each other's flame. Regarding the song, Coma_Cose stated: "Fiamme negli occhi is a photograph of our history, perhaps of the history of many. It's a song about staying together even in the face of obstacles. Our life, our dreams, music for us are a journey to travel together and sometimes we need to shout it in our face. We believe in a path of mutual growth, we hope that other people will relate themselves in all this".

== Music video ==
The music video for the song was released on YouTube on 3 March 2021, to accompany the single's release. It was directed by Enea Colombi.

== Track listing ==
Digital download
No.	Title	Length
1.	"Fiamme negli occhi"	3:26

== Charts ==
Chart performance for "Fiamme negli occhi"
Chart (2021)	Peak position
Italy (FIMI)	6
Italy Airplay (EarOne)	11
San Marino (SMRRTV Top 50)	14

== Certifications ==
Region	Certification	Certified units/sales
Italy (FIMI)	2× Platinum	140,000^{‡}
^{‡} Sales+streaming figures based on certification alone.
