= Italian Navy Band =

Italian military band

Italian Navy Band Banda musicale della Marina Militare
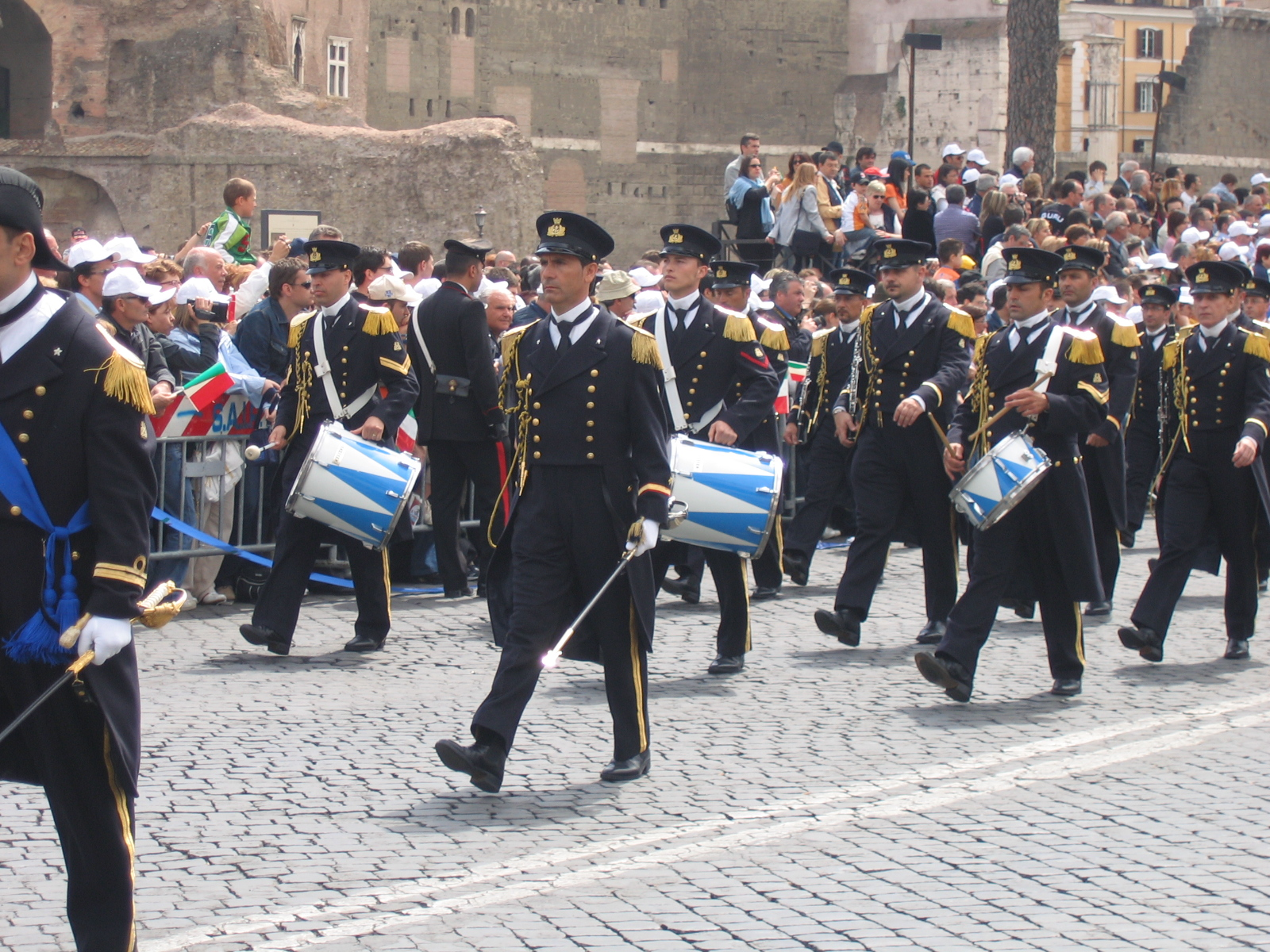
- The band at a military parade in the capital.

Background information
- Origin: Rome, Italy
- Years active: 1843-present
- Website: www.bandamilitaresanmarino.org

The Italian Navy Band (Italian: Banda musicale della Marina Militare) is an Italian military band based in Rome which serves under the Italian Navy. The band was established in 1870 in La Spezia and is one of the oldest Italian military band units in the Italian Armed Forces. In 1965, it was transferred to Taranto before it was finally relocated to Rome in 1991. The band conducts concerts both in Italy and abroad, performing for international audiences as well as performing for charity, as is in the case of the concert held in 2004 at the International Center for Peace among the Peoples of Assisi. Common Italian venues the band performs in includes the Milan Auditorium, the Accademia Nazionale di Santa Cecilia, the Parco della Musica, and the Teatro di San Carlo. The band is currently composed of a conductor, a vice conductor, an archivist, as well as 102 NCO musicians drawn from music universities all over the country.

The repertoire of the band includes many genres besides marching music, ranging from classical to jazz. Captain Antonio Barbagallo (born on September 4, 1968) is the current conductor of the band. Barbagallo, who was educated at the Accademia Nazionale di Santa Cecilia, has been in his position since the early 2000s. The band commanding officer is Captain Giacomo Polimeni.

== See also ==
- Musique des Troupes de Marine
- Royal Swedish Navy Band
