= Bugo =

Italian singer-songwriter (born 1973)

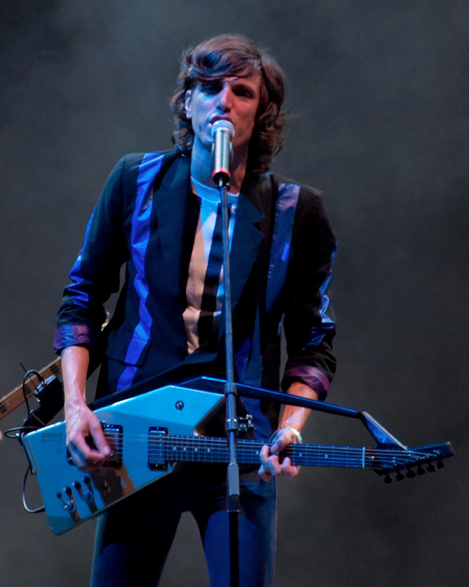
- Bugo playing live in 2009

Background information
- Born: Cristian Bugatti; August 2, 1973 (age 53); Rho, Lombardy, Italy
- Genres: Lo-fi; indie rock; garage rock; pop; hip hop; folk rock
- Instruments: Vocals; guitars; synthesizer; electronic keyboard; bass guitar; drum kit; harmonica
- Years active: 1999–2025
- Labels: Universal; Carosello Records; ADA Music Italy; Bar La Muerte; Snowdonia Dischi; Wallace Records; Mescal

Cristian Bugatti (born 2 August 1973), known professionally as Bugo, is an Italian singer-songwriter, artist and actor. He spent his youth in the rice fields of Cerano, in the Province of Novara, in the Piedmont region. A self-taught artist, Bugo did not attend art or music schools. In 2000 he moved to Milan, where he started his musical career. According to AllMusic, Bugo was one of the most interesting and innovative artists to emerge from the Italian independent scene of the 1990s. Although he is beloved by fans and critics, others consider him a comedy act. Blending international sound and Italian lyrics, Bugo became a cantautore (singer-songwriter) of the 2000s who moved the political songs of the 1970s into the disillusioned songwriting of the 2000s. He is considered a pioneer of the Italian singer-songwriter scene, and the neologism fantautore has been coined to describe him. Between 2008 and 2014, Bugo has been working in the visual arts. He participated in the Sanremo Music Festival 2020 and Sanremo Music Festival 2021. He retired from music in 2025, with a final concert in Milan.

== Musical career ==
In 1992, Bugo left Cerano to serve in the Italian military. During his service, he learned to play the guitar and began writing songs. Bugo's first two albums, La Prima Gratta (2000) and Sentimento Westernato (2001) were released on independent labels. In 2002 he signed with Universal Music Group, and was chosen Artist of the Year.

In October 2002 Bugo released his first album on Universal, Dal Lofai al Cisei. Its first single is "Casalingo" ("Household"), followed by "Io Mi Rompo I Coglioni" ("I Bust My Balls"), and they are among his most popular. In April 2004 Bugo released the double album, Golia & Melchiorre. It is divided in two parts: electric, experimental and intimate, acoustic music. The album cover shows Bugo holding his severed head by the hair like a modern Caravaggio. It was censored by the record company, which placed a picnic-basket sticker over Bugo's face. Its lead single, Carla è Franca ("Carla Is Franca"), was also censored by the music television channels. Bugo's third album for Universal, Sguardo Contemporaneo, was released in April 2006; its single, Amore Mio Infinito ("My Infinite Love"), is a duet with actress Violante Placido.

In 2008 Contatti was released on Universal, bringing Bugo into the mainstream. The album's first single, C'è Crisi ("There's Crisis"), received airplay on national radio. In August 2008, producer-DJ Steve Aoki included "La Mano Mia" (The Bloody Beetroots remix) on a Radio-1 mix for BBC Radio. A video for Felicità ("Happiness") is directed by Federico Vitetta and Ty Evans and produced by Spike Jonze. Bugo performed on the main stage of the 2009 Italia Wave, celebrating the fortieth anniversary of Woodstock, re-interpreting Jimi Hendrix in Fire.

In 2011 Bugo appeared in and wrote the soundtrack for the film Missione di pace ("Mission of Peace"), which premiered at the Venice Film Festival. That year he released another album on Universal, Nuovi rimedi per la miopia ("New Remedies For Myopia"). In July 2012 The Guardian published an article on current Italian music in Europe, citing Bugo, Jovanotti and Vasco Rossi.

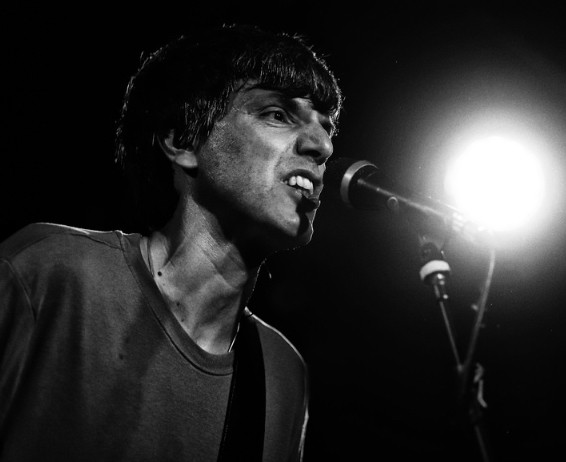
Bugo playing live in 2018

In 2013, before an Italian acoustic tour, Bugo played Comunque io voglio te ("However I Want You") for BalconyTV in New Delhi, an online music channel featuring acts on balconies around the world. In September 2013, director Andrea Caccia (who has filmed Bugo since 2001) announced that he is completing a film about Bugo's music entitled Ora Respiro ("Now I Breathe").

In February 2015 Bugo signed a contract with historic Italian label "Carosello Records" The announcement comes at the same time the inclusion of his face among the 100 of Italian music, the special celebratory by Rolling Stone Magazine, which defines Bugo "the irrepressible revolutionary of the Italian song". In April 2016 Nessuna scala da salire ("No ladder to climb") was released on Carosello, reaching Number 1 position of official vinyl chart. The promotional tour is very successful throughout Italy, with concerts in clubs and prestigious festivals like Primo Maggio in Rome and the Sziget Festival in Budapest.

In 2018 "RockBugo" was released. The album is a collection of Bugo songs rearranged in rock style, following the steps of bands such as Oasis and Nirvana.

He participated at the Sanremo Music Festival 2020 with the song "Sincero", performing with Morgan. The performance caused a big scandal in the Italian news, due to the controversy started by his music partner Morgan, leading the artist to leave the stage during the song.

On 7 February he released a new album entitled Cristian Bugatti. A second single excerpt from the album is "Mi Manca" featuring Ermal Meta. Bugo is selected among the big ones for Sanremo Music Festival 2021.

He participated at the Sanremo Music Festival 2021 with the song "E invece sì". On 5 March he released a new album entitled "Bugatti Cristian".

In March 2024 Bugo released a new album "Per fortuna che ci sono io" (ADA Music Italy). In 2025 he announced his retirement from music scene with a concert-event at the Alcatraz venue in Milan.

== Visual arts ==
Between 2008 and 2014, Bugo has been working in the visual arts. In 2010 he held his first exhibition in Rome, displaying 67 people arranged along the gallery's inner perimeter. Art International Radio, an online radio station based in New York City, interviewed him. In 2012 Bugo participated in MiArt, an international art fair in Milan, exhibiting three photographs of children with beards. He held his second solo exhibition at the Room Gallery, a large photographic installation of the overturned interior of the exhibition space. As part of a 2013 art series on the streets of Ghaziabad, India, Bugo displayed a billboard with a surreal phrase created from newspaper clippings against a red background. More art from newspaper clippings were included in the fourth issue of Le Dictateur, a magazine with twenty series of commissioned works by international artists at the Palais de Tokyo in Paris. That year Bugo held his third solo exhibition at Wilson Project Space in Sassari, featuring a large self-portrait. A second self-portrait was displayed at "Art4shop" in September, and a third on the streets of New Delhi during the India Art Fair. In 2014 he published "Acid Times", a print art magazine in the format of a daily newspaper, created as an ironic, irreverent, and provocative response to traditional media and the way news is reported.

== Discography ==
- 2000 – La prima gratta (Snowdonia/Bar La Muerte Records)
- 2001 – Sentimento westernato (Wallace Records/ Bar La Muerte Records)
- 2002 – Dal lofai al cisei (Universal Music)
- 2004 – Golia & Melchiorre (Universal Music)
- 2006 – Sguardo contemporaneo (Universal Music)
- 2008 – Contatti (Universal Music)
- 2011 – Nuovi rimedi per la miopia (Universal Music)
- 2016 – "Nessuna scala da salire" (Carosello Records)
- 2018 – "RockBugo" (Mescal)
- 2020 – "Cristian Bugatti" (Mescal)
- 2020 – "The platinum collection" (Universal Music)
- 2021 – "Bugatti Cristian" (Mescal)
- 2024 – "Per fortuna che ci sono io" (ADA Music Italy)

== Exhibitions/actions ==
- 2009 – Gemine Muse, Faraggiana Ferrandi Museum, Novara, Italy
- 2010 – V.M.21 Gallery, solo exhibition, Rome, Italy
- 2012 – Room Gallery, solo exhibition, Milan, Italy
- 2013 – French fries killing lovers, billboard, Ghaziabad, India
- 2013 – Solo exhibition at Wilson Project Space, Sassari, Italy
- 2013 – Art4shop, public art project, Milan, Italy
- 2014 – Untitled, billboard, New Delhi, India
- 2014 – Acid Times, newspaper, New Delhi, India and Milan, Italy
