= Coma Cose =

Italian indie pop-hip hop musical duo

Coma_Cose
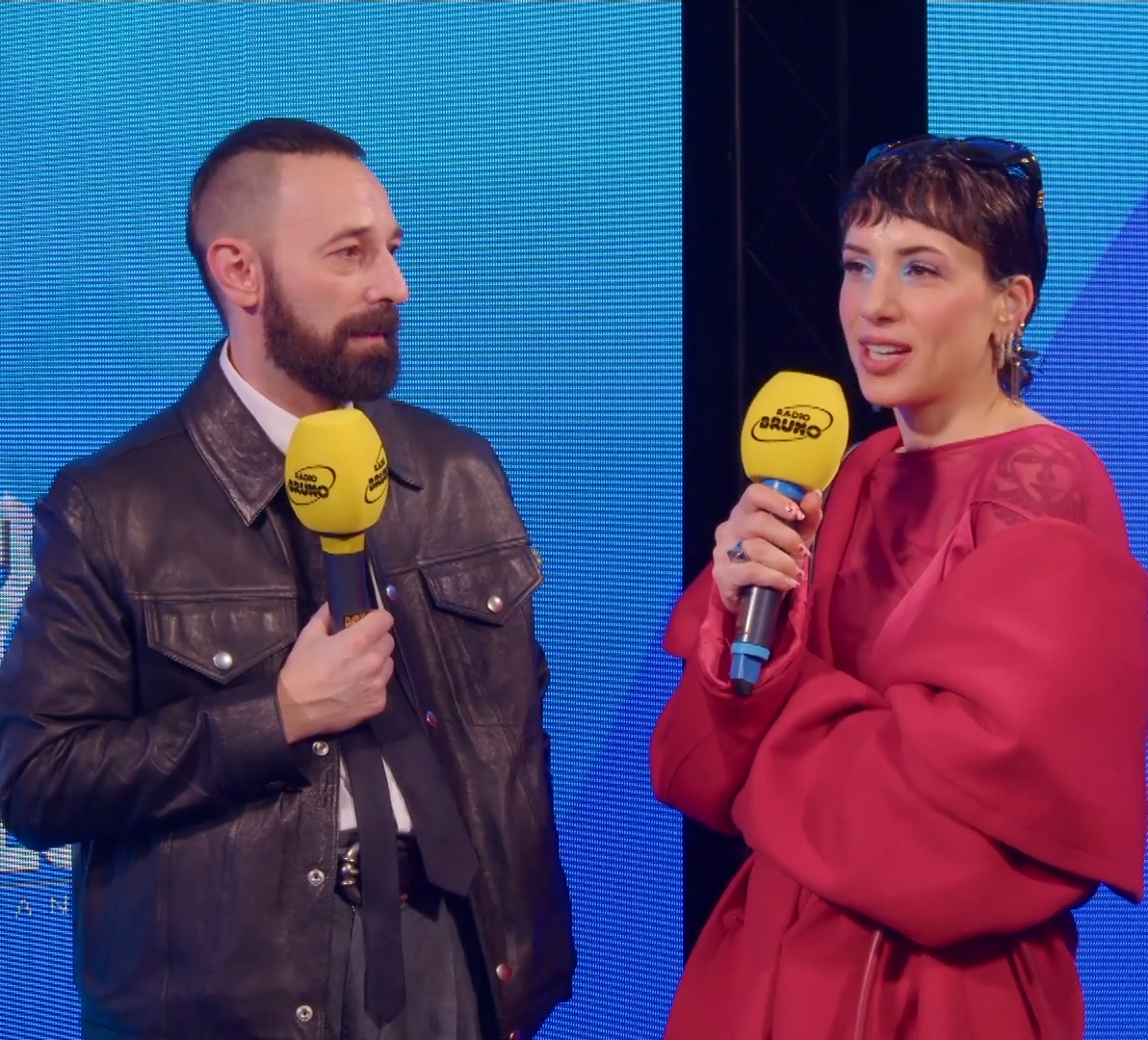
- Coma_Cose in 2025

Background information
- Origin: Milan, Lombardy, Italy
- Genres: Indie pop; pop rap
- Years active: 2017–2025
- Label: Asian Fake
- Past members: Fausto Lama; California

Coma_Cose was an Italian indie pop–hip hop musical duo formed in 2017 by Fausto Zanardelli (born 21 November 1978 in Gavardo), also known as Fausto Lama or Edipo, and Francesca Mesiano (born 11 July 1990 in Pordenone), also known as California. The duo was disbanded upon the end of their marriage in 2025.

== History ==
Zanardelli had temporarily given up on his music career before being convinced to relaunch it when he met Mesiano in the Navigli area of Milan, at the launch event for a mutual friend's shop.

In 2017 they signed to the label Asian Fake, before releasing their debut single "Cannibalismo". They reached a wider audience with 2018 single "Post concerto", which achieved a gold record certification. Their debut album Hype Aura was released on 15 March 2019.

In 2020, Coma_Cose also appeared as themselves in the Netflix's series Summertime, performing the song "Mancarsi".

The duo participated have made three appearances at the Sanremo Music Festival. The first was at Sanremo Music Festival 2021 with the song "Fiamme negli occhi", finishing in 20th position. On the third night they sang the Lucio Battisti song "Il mio canto libero" alongside Alberto Radius and Mamakass. They appeared again at Sanremo 2023, with the song "L'addio", finishing in 13th position. On the fourth night they covered "Sarà perché ti amo" by Ricchi e Poveri alongside Baustelle. They made a third appearance at Sanremo in 2025 with the song "Cuoricini", with which they ultimately placed 10th. On the fourth night, they sang "L'estate sta finendo" alongside Johnson Righeira.

In October of that year, Coma_Cose announced their divorce – they had married on 9 February 2023 – and the subsequent disbandment of their musical project.

== Discography ==
=== Studio albums ===
List of studio albums with peak chart positions
Title	Details	Peak chart positions
Title	Details	ITA
Hype aura	Released: 15 March 2019; Label: Asian Fake	9
Nostralgia	Released: 16 April 2021; Label: Asian Fake	5
Un meraviglioso modo di salvarsi	Released: 4 November 2022; Label: Asian Fake	16
Vita fusa	Released: 7 March 2025; Label: Asian Fake	5

=== Compilations ===
- Fondamenta (2019)

=== Extended plays ===
- Inverno ticinese (2017)
- Due (2020)

=== Singles ===
==== As lead artist ====
List of singles as lead artist, with peak chart positions, showing year released and album name
Title	Year	Peak chart positions	Certifications	Album
Title	Year	ITA	Certifications	Album
"Cannibalismo"	2017	—		Non-album singles
"Golgota"	2017	—		Non-album singles
"Deserto"	2017	—		Non-album singles
"Jugoslavia"	2017	—		Non-album singles
"Post concerto"	2018	—	FIMI: Gold	Non-album singles
"Nudo integrale"	2018	—		Non-album singles
"Via Gola"	2019	—		Hype Aura
"Granata"	2019	—		Hype Aura
"Mancarsi"	2019	—	FIMI: Platinum	Hype Aura
"Guerre fredde"	2020	—		Due
"Fiamme negli occhi"	2021	6	FIMI: 2× Platinum	Nostralgia
"La canzone dei lupi"	2021	—		Nostralgia
"Chiamami"	2022	—		Un meraviglioso modo di salvarsi
"L'addio"	2023	10	FIMI: 2× Platinum	Un meraviglioso modo di salvarsi
"Agosto morsica"	2023	—		Non-album single
"Malavita"	2024	7	FIMI: Platinum	Vita fusa
"Posti vuoti"	2024	58		Vita fusa
"Cuoricini"	2025	4	FIMI: Platinum	Vita fusa
"La gelosia"	2025	—		Vita fusa
"—" denotes a single that did not chart or was not released.

==== As featured artist ====
- "Aurora sogna" with Subsonica (2019)
- "Riserva naturale" with Francesca Michielin (2020)
- "Una cosa bene" with Articolo 31 (2023)

== Filmography ==
- Summertime (2020)
