= Potevi fare di più =

Single by Arisa

from the album Ero romantica
- Released: 3 March 2021
- Genre: Pop
- Length: 4:04
- Label: Pipshow, Believe Digital
- Songwriter: Gigi D'Alessio

Arisa singles chronology
"Ricominciare ancora" (2020)	"Potevi fare di più" (2021)	"Quando" (2021)

"Potevi fare di più" is a song by Italian singer Arisa. It was written by Gigi D'Alessio and released on 3 March 2021.

The song was Arisa's entry for the Sanremo Music Festival 2021, the 71st edition of Italy's musical festival which doubles also as a selection of the act for Eurovision Song Contest, where it placed 10th in the grand final. "Potevi fare di più" peaked at number 16 on the Italian FIMI Singles Chart and was certified gold in Italy.

== Background ==
The song deals with the theme of liberation from a toxic sentimental relationship. It tells the story of a woman who finds the strength to sever a love that is now over by giving up vain attempts to persevere in the relationship. The singer stated: "When we feel that a situation is not congenial to our strings, we must take responsibility for our discomfort and make sure that things change. Time is short and we waste it. We must use it to be happy and to make others happy. But the most important thing is to develop a great love for oneself because only in this way will we recognize the love of others". Regarding the collaboration with Gigi D'Alessio, Arisa said: "I respect Gigi very much and I find him a master of music. He wrote songs that entered popular culture and traveled the world with his songs. With his writing I also wanted to get closer to my Lucanian origins. I sing the south through a Neapolitan mold, I feel like singing a Neapolitan sentiment".

== Music video ==
The music video for the song was released on YouTube on 3 March 2021, to accompany the single's release. It was directed by Danilo Bubani and shoot in Rome and New York.

== Live performances ==
On 20 March 2021 Arisa performed the song during the first show of the 20th season of Amici di Maria De Filippi.

== Track listing ==
Digital download
No.	Title	Length
1.	"Potevi fare di più"	4:04

== Charts ==
Chart performance for "Potevi fare di più"
Chart (2021)	Peak position
Italy (FIMI)	16
Italy Airplay (EarOne)	38

== Certifications ==
Region	Certification	Certified units/sales
Italy (FIMI)	Gold	35,000^{‡}
^{‡} Sales+streaming figures based on certification alone.
