= Otierre =

Italian hip-hop band

Otierre (a.k.a. OTR) are an Italian hip hop band.
The name means Originale Trasmissione del Ritmo (Original Rhythm Transmission).

== History and members ==
OTR was formed in 1991 in Varese, and the final formation was:,

- Esa (a.k.a. El Presidente, real name Francesco Cellamaro, born in Reggio Calabria on 1973 and living in Varese)
- Polare (a.k.a. Polaroide, real name Daniele Macchi, from Varese)
- Torrido (a.k.a. Thor)
- Azza
- Intruso
- Limite

and the DJs:

- Fede
- Irmu
- Vigor
- Vez
- Nitro

== Discography ==
=== Quel Sapore Particolare (1994) ===
1. Entro
2. Quando meno te l'aspetti
3. Slaugio
4. Il punto della situazione
5. Arresta
6. Pronto pine
7. Lo sciupa
8. Chi va la'
9. Dei colori
10. Il passo e' veloce
11. Esco
12. La nuova realta'

=== Dalla Sede (1997) ===
1. La 'O' la 'T' la 'R' feat. La Pina
2. Ce n'e'feat. La Pina
3. Rispettane l'aroma feat. La Pina
4. Extrapolare
5. Finallafinefininfondo feat. La Pina
6. Anothasounwatess
7. Chiedo permesso
8. Pura algebra feat. La Pina
9. Secondo me
10. Ha-ha!! feat. Toni-L
11. Soci per la vita
12. Play your position feat. La Pina, Rival Capone
13. Rispettane l'aroma (Radio Edit)
