= Malavita (song) =

Single by Coma_Cose
- Released: 26 April 2024
- Length: 2:46
- Label: Asian Fake; Warner
- Composers: Giordano Cremona; Federico Mercuri; Eugenio Maimone; Leonardo Grillotti
- Lyricists: Francesca Mesiano; Fausto Zanardelli; Federica Abbate; Jacopo Ettorre
- Producer: Itaca

Coma_Cose singles chronology
"Una cosa bene" (2023)	"Malavita" (2024)	"Posti vuoti" (2024)

"Malavita" is a song by Italian musical duo Coma_Cose. It was written by band members Francesca Mesiano (California) and Fausto Zanardelli (Fausto Lama) with Federica Abbate and Jacopo Ettorre, and produced by the collective Itaca, formed by Merk & Kremont, Eugenio Maimone and Leonardo Grillotti.

It was released by Asian Fake and Warner on 26 April 2024.

== Background ==
The song incorporates elements drawn from flamenco and pizzica. Describing the single in a press release, Coma_Cose stated:

"It's a song about redemption. It tells the story of a woman who managed to escape from something that kept her captive. It has the essence of the Mediterranean, and like the sea, it is both sun and storm. It has been a beautiful winter: we took our time to fix our home, which is always a metaphor for something else; we made a lot of music, but the words never took flight; we simply realized that we had nothing new, nothing 'of our own,' that we hadn't already said. You have to live to describe it in music. And then, an insight: a bit like certain distant singer-songwriters did, we felt the urge to tell the stories of others, which are always a way to speak a little about oneself."

== Music video ==
The music video for the song was directed by Fausto Lama himself and released on YouTube on the same day of the single's release.

== Reception ==
Federico Pucci from Fanpage.it observes that the lyrics of the song "lack the autobiographical and reflective imprint typical of the duo's previous work," associating them with the folk repertoires of Fabrizio De André, which are containers of stories narrated in both the first and third person. The journalist notes a change in sound as well, highlighting the use of "a classical guitar, with soft strings, strumming an A minor that rises and falls in a manner typical of flamenco and even more so of the ciaccona."

Alessandro Alicandri from TV Sorrisi e Canzoni also points out the shift in the song's musical production compared to the artists' discography, stating that it "mixes overtly folk sounds with an urban and highly danceable setup," while appreciating the feminist theme of "a woman immersed in a difficult and oppressive social context like the criminal underworld, who decides to escape at a certain point."

== Charts ==
=== Weekly charts ===
Weekly chart performance for "Malavita"
Chart (2024)	Peak position
Italy (FIMI)	7
Italy Airplay (EarOne)	1

=== Year-end charts ===
2024 year-end chart performance for "Malavita"
Chart (2024)	Position
Italy (FIMI)	42

== Certifications ==
Region	Certification	Certified units/sales
Italy (FIMI)	Platinum	100,000^{‡}
^{‡} Sales+streaming figures based on certification alone.
