= Extraliscio =

Italian band

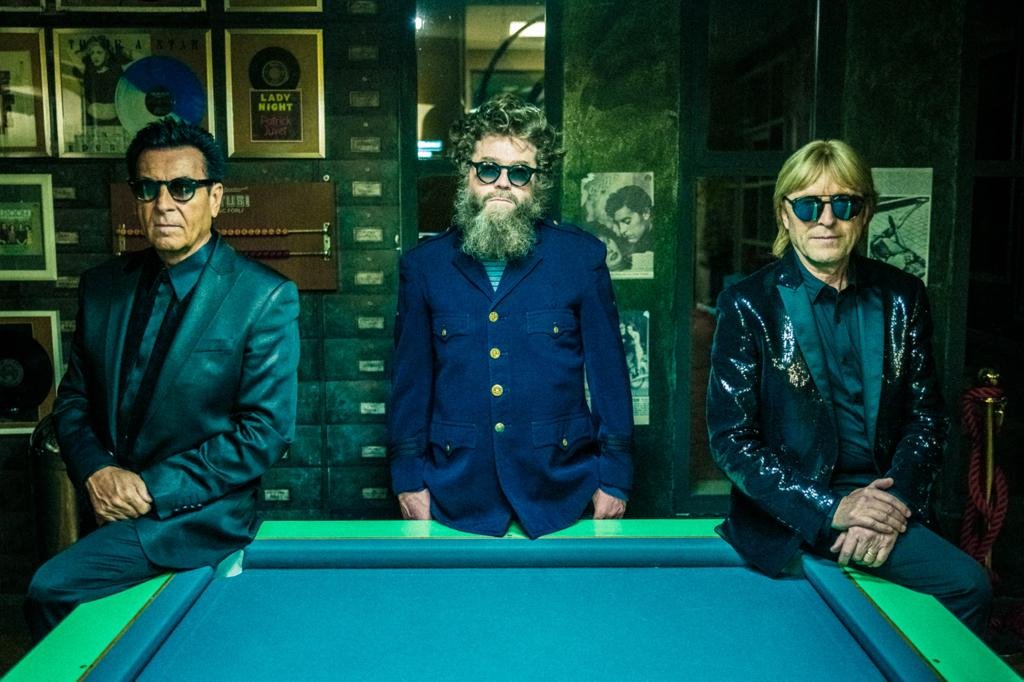
- Mauro Ferrara, Mirco Mariani and Moreno il Biondo (from left to right)

Background information
- Origin: Emilia-Romagna, Italy
- Genres: Liscio; Folk rock Punk rock
- Years active: 2014–present
- Members: Mirco Mariani; Moreno il Biondo; Mauro Ferrara

Extraliscio is an Italian folk band formed in 2014 and known for their style that combines traditional liscio ballroom dance with rock and punk music.

They debuted in 2016 with the album Canzoni da ballo. The band participated at the Sanremo Music Festival 2021 with the song "Bianca luce nera", featuring Davide Toffolo from Tre Allegri Ragazzi Morti.

== Discography ==
=== Studio albums ===
- Canzoni da ballo (2016)
- Imballabilissimi - Ballabilissimi (2017)
- Punk da balera (2020)
- È bello perdersi (2021)

== Filmography ==
- Extraliscio: Punk da balera, directed by Elisabetta Sgarbi (2020)
