= Random (rapper) =

Italian rapper and singer (born 2001)

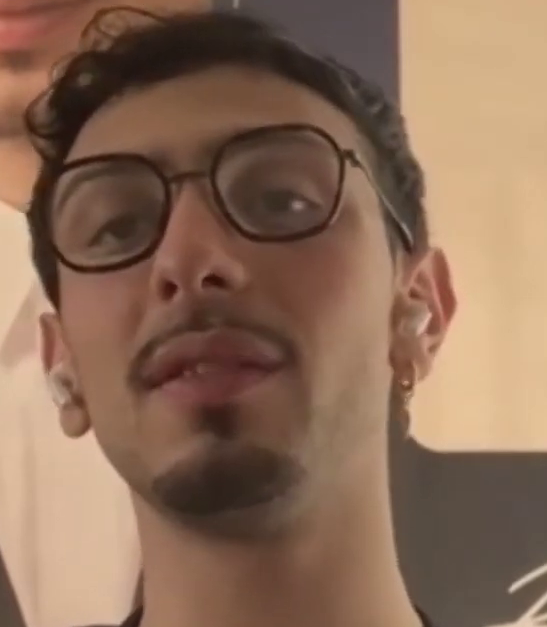

Background information
- Born: Emanuele Caso; 26 April 2001 (age 24); Massa di Somma, Campania, Italy
- Genres: Hip hop Pop rap
- Occupations: Rapper, singer
- Years active: 2018–present

Emanuele Caso (born 26 April 2001), known professionally as Random, is an Italian rapper and singer. His stage name is a pun on his surname: "a caso" means "at random" in Italian.

He participated at the Sanremo Music Festival 2021 with the song "Torno a te".

== Discography ==
=== Studio albums ===
- Giovane oro (2018)
- Nuvole (2021)

=== Extended plays ===
- Montagne russe (2020)

=== Singles ===
- "Bad bitch bionda" (2018)
- "Re" (2019)
- "Chiasso" (2019)
- "180" (2019)
- "Rossetto" (2019)
- "Scusa a a a" (2020)
- "Marionette" with Carl Brave (2020)
- "Sono un bravo ragazzo un po' fuori di testa" (2020)
- "Nudi nel letto" (2020)
- "Ritornerai 2" (2020)
- "Sono luce" (2020)
- "Torno a te" (2021)
