= Fasma =

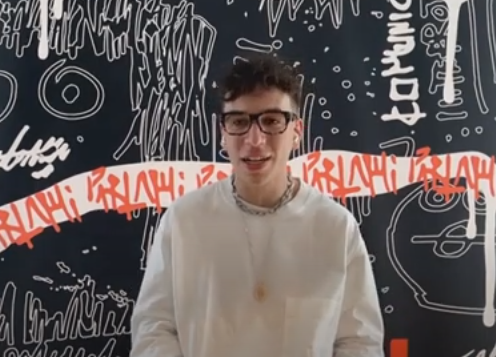
- Fasma (2021)

Background information
- Born: Tiberio Fazioli; 17 December 1996 (age 29); Rome, Italy
- Genres: Pop rap; emo-rap
- Occupations: Rapper; singer; songwriter
- Years active: 2016–present
- Label: Sony Music

Tiberio Fazioli (born 17 December 1996), known professionally as Fasma, is an Italian singer-songwriter and rapper.

== Biography ==
Born and raised in Rome, he founded the hip hop crew "WFK" in 2016 and released his debut EP WFK.1 on 5 July 2018.

His first studio album Moriresti per vivere con me? was released on 2 November 2018.

Fasma participated at the "Newcomers" section of the Sanremo Music Festival 2020 with the song "Per sentirmi vivo" advancing to the semifinals.

In 2021, he competed in the main section of the Sanremo Music Festival with the song "Parlami".

== Discography ==
=== Studio albums ===
- Moriresti per vivere con me? (2018)
- Io sono Fasma (2020)
- Ho conosciuto la mia ombra! (2023)

=== Extended plays ===
- WFK.1 (2018)

=== Singles ===
- "Marilyn M." (2018)
- "Mi ami" (2019)
- "Per sentirmi vivo" (2019)
- "Parlami" (2021)
- "Indelebile" (2021)
