= Gio Evan =

Italian writer, poet and singer-songwriter

- Born: Giovanni Giancaspro; 21 April 1988 (age 38); Molfetta, Apulia, Italy
- Genres: Indie pop
- Occupations: Poet; singer; songwriter
- Years active: 2013–present

Giovanni Giancaspro (born 21 April 1988), known professionally as Gio Evan, is an Italian writer, poet and singer-songwriter.

He participated at Sanremo Music Festival 2021 with the song "Arnica".

== Biography ==
In his early twenties he wrote his debut book Il florilegio passato, a collection in verse about his trip to India; the book was self-published and was distributed by the author himself on the streets in Italy.

Between 2012 and 2013 he founded Le scarpe del vento, a musical project where he writes, sings and plays guitar. He independently releases his first record, Craniotherapy.

Over the next four years he continued his travels through Europe and South America.

In 2014 he began two projects on the French streets, Gigantographies and The Smallest Poems in the World. The same year he published his second book, and first novel, The Beautiful Way.

He returned to writing in verse in 2015 with the collection Theorem of a Leap, reasoned metaphysical poems (Narcissuss), which earned him a contract with Miraggi editions, with which he published the subsequent Pass to Surprise Me, as well as writing and directing the opera Oh Issa - Safe for Heaven.

Meanwhile, his fame grows thanks also to his success on Social networking service such as Instagram and Facebook where he shares short aphorisms in verse from his works. In 2017 he published with Fratelli Fabbri Editori Capita a volte che ti penso sempre, which was followed the following year by Ormai tra noi è tutto infinito. In 2018 he releases his first album Biglietto di solo ritorno for MArteLabel. In the spring he published his new novel Cento cuori dentro (A Hundred Hearts Inside), also published by Fabbri Editori, followed by the release of his second album, Natura molta, distributed by Artist First, in the fall of 2019.

After another tour between November and February 2020, the artist releases for Fabbri Editori Se c'è un posto bello sei te, released on May 5, 2020. On the 15th of the same month, the single Regali fatti a mano (Polydor / Universal) is released.

On June 28, 2020, the “Tree but Estro” tour begins from Bologna.

On September 11 of the same year, he performed and was awarded the Music to Drink plaque as part of the event of the same name.

On October 6, his book I ricordi preziosi di Noah Gingols (Precious Memories of Noah Gingols) with illustrations by Ferruccio Carubini published by Fabbri Editori was released, and a month later, on November 6, his single Glenn Miller was released on the Polydor label (Universal Music Italia).

On December 17, 2020, it is announced at Sanremo Giovani 2020 that he will make his debut among the Bigs on the Ariston stage at the Sanremo Music Festival 2021 with the song Arnica. The single, written by him and produced by Katoo, is part of the new album Mareducato released later on March 12, 2021 on the Polydor label (Universal Music Italia).

== Works ==
=== Poems ===
- Teorema di un salto (2015)
- Passa a sorprendermi (2016)
- Capita a volte che ti penso sempre (2017)
- Ormai tra noi è tutto infinito (2018)
- Se c'è un posto bello sei te (2020)

=== Novels ===
- La bella maniera (2014)
- Cento cuori dentro (2019)
- I ricordi preziosi di Noah Gingols (2020)

== Discography ==
=== Studio albums ===
- Biglietto di solo ritorno (2018)
- Natura molta (2019)
- Mareducato (2021)

=== Singles ===
- "Più in alto" (2017)
- "Posti" (2017)
- "Pane in cassetta" (2018)
- "A piedi il mondo" (2018)
- "Joseph Beuys" (2018)
- "Himalaya Cocktail" (2019)
- "Amazzonia" (2019)
- "Scudo" (2019)
- "Klimt" (2019)
- "Regali fatti a mano" (2020)
- "Glenn Miller" (2020)
- "Arnica" (2021)
