= Lo Stato Sociale =

Italian band

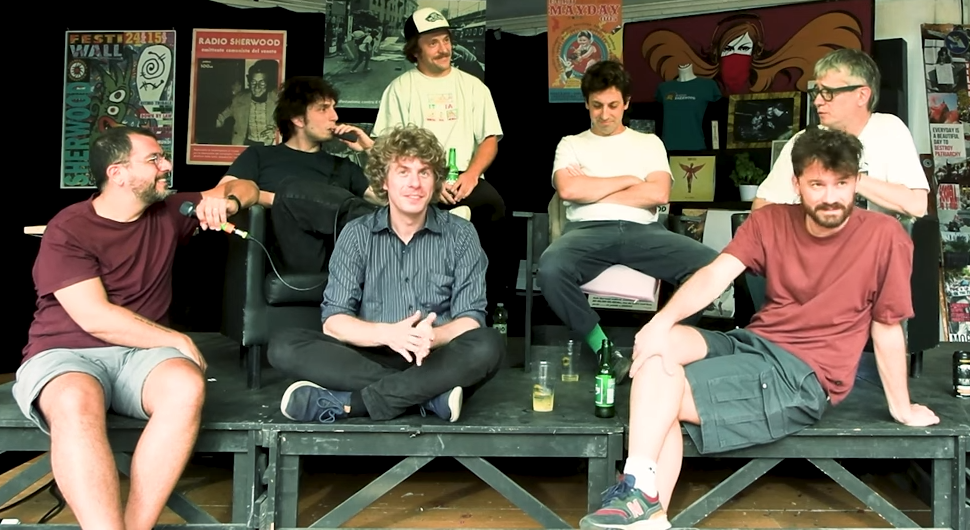
- Interviewed in mid-2024

Background information
- Origin: Bologna, Italy
- Genres: Indie rock; indie pop; pop rock
- Years active: 2009–2024
- Labels: Garrincha; Island; Universal
- Past members: Alberto Cazzola; Francesco Draicchio; Lodovico Guenzi; Alberto Guidetti; Enrico Roberto
- Website: lostatosociale.net

Lo Stato Sociale (Italian for "The Welfare State") were an Italian band, formed in 2009 and consisting of Alberto Cazzola, Lodovico "Lodo" Guenzi, Enrico Roberto, Francesco Draicchio and Alberto Guidetti.

The group released four studio albums, two compilation albums, and eight EPs, along with a series of singles. They participated in the Sanremo Music Festival twice: in 2018 with "Una vita in vacanza" and in 2021 with "Combat Pop". "Una vita in vacanza" is also the band's biggest hit, having reached second place at Sanremo, first place on the FIMI's singles chart, and being certified double platinum.

In 2024, following the death of their manager and mentor Matteo Romagnoli the previous year, the group announced their disbandment.

== History ==
They made their debut in 2010 with the extended play, Welfare Pop, then releasing Amore ai tempi dell'Ikea in 2011. Their debut full-length studio album, Turisti della democrazia, was released by independent record label Garrincha Dischi in 2012. Its follow-up, L'Italia peggiore, became their first charting album, peaking at number 11 on the Italian FIMI Albums Chart in 2014. In 2015, they performed for the first time at the Concerto del Primo Maggio, a televised concert promoted by Italian trade unions to celebrate the International Workers' Day. They performed at the show again in 2017 and 2018.

Their 2017 album, Amore, lavoro e altri miti da sfatare, reached number 6 in Italy. They reached mainstream success in 2018, after placing second in the 68th Sanremo Music Festival with the song "Una vita in vacanza". The performance featured 83-year-old Dancer Paddy Jones, appearing on stage with her partner Nico. The song topped the Italian Singles Chart and was featured on the band's first compilation album, Primati.

In 2021, they returned to the Sanremo Music Festival with "Combat Pop". That same year, they released five EPs ―Bebo, Checco, Carota, Lodo, and Albi― one for each member of the group (titled after their nicknames), with each EP sung by the respective member. The five records were collected into an album titled Attentato alla musica italiana, which came out following their Sanremo performance.

On 5 May 2023, they released the fourth studio album Stupido sexy futuro. On 15 June, the group announced the death of their manager Matteo Romagnoli, also mentor, producer and author for the group. The track "Non la vedo bene", produced by the band Management in collaboration with Lo Stato Sociale, and one of Romagnoli's last works, was released ten days after his passing. In early 2024, Lo Stato Sociale organized "Impubblicabile!", a festival in Bologna in memory of Romagnoli, featuring various artists associated with label Garrincha Dischi. On 25 June of the same year, after their performance at the Sherwood Festival in Padua, the band announced their intention to withdraw from the scene.

== Discography ==
=== Studio albums ===
List of studio albums, with chart positions and certifications
Title	Details	Peak chart positions	Certifications
Title	Details	ITA	Certifications
Turisti della democrazia	Released: 14 February 2012; Label: Garrincha Dischi; Format: CD, LP, digital download, streaming	11	
L'Italia peggiore	Released: 2 June 2014; Label: Garrincha Dischi; Format: CD, LP, digital download, streaming	11	
Amore, lavoro e altri miti da sfatare	Released: 10 March 2017; Label: Garrincha Dischi; Format: CD, LP, digital download, streaming	3	
Stupido sexy futuro	Released: 5 May 2023; Label: Garrincha Dischi; Format: CD, LP, digital download, streaming	—	

=== Compilation albums ===
List of compilation albums, with chart positions and certifications
Title	Year	Peak position	Certifications
Title	Year	ITA	Certifications
Primati	Released: 9 February 2018; Label: Garrincha Dischi; Format: CD, LP, digital download, streaming	6	
Attentato alla musica italiana	Released: 4 March 2021; Label: Garrincha Dischi, Island, Universal; Format: CD, LP, digital download, streaming	42	

=== Extended plays ===
- Welfare Pop (2010)
- Amore ai tempi dell'Ikea (2011)
- Bebo (2021)
- Checco (2021)
- Carota (2021)
- Lodo (2021)
- Albi (2021)
- Sotto un milione di nuvole (2024)

=== Singles ===
==== As lead artist ====
List of singles as lead artist, with selected chart positions, showing year released and album name
Title	Year	Peak chart positions		Certifications	Album
Title	Year	ITA	SWI	Certifications	Album
"C'eravamo tanto sbagliati"	2014	17	—		L'Italia peggiore
"Il cassetto del dipendente"	2014	29	—		Non-album single
"Questo è un grande Paese" (featuring Piotta)	2014	—	—		L'Italia peggiore
"La rivoluzione non passerà in TV"	2015	—	—		L'Italia peggiore
"La musica non è una cosa seria"	2015	—	—		L'Italia peggiore
"Campetto" (with Altre di B)	2016	—	—		Non-album singles
"Pubbliche dimostrazioni d'odio" (with Immanuel Casto)	2016	—	—		Non-album singles
"Amarsi male"	2016	—	—	FIMI: Gold	Amore, lavoro e altri miti da sfatare
"Mai stato meglio"	2017	—	—		Amore, lavoro e altri miti da sfatare
"Vorrei essere una canzone"	2017	—	—		Amore, lavoro e altri miti da sfatare
"Buona sfortuna"	2017	—	—		Amore, lavoro e altri miti da sfatare
"Niente di speciale"	2017	—	—		Amore, lavoro e altri miti da sfatare
"Socialismo tropicale"	2017	—	—		Non-album single
"Una vita in vacanza"	2018	1	64	FIMI: 2× Platinum	Primati
"Facile"	2018	—	—		Primati
"Il paese dell'amore"	2018	—	—		Attentato alla musica italiana
"Sentimento estero"	2019	—	—		Attentato alla musica italiana
"DJ di m****" (featuring Arisa and Myss Keta)	2019	—	—		Non-album single
"Autocertificanzone"	2020	—	—		Attentato alla musica italiana
"Combat Pop"	2021	15	—		Attentato alla musica italiana
"Fottuti per sempre" (featuring Vasco Brondi)	2023	—	—		Stupido sexy futuro
"Che benessere!?" (featuring Naska)	2023	—	—		Stupido sexy futuro
"Per farti ridere di me" (featuring Mobrici)	2023	—	—		Stupido sexy futuro
"—" denotes a recording that did not chart or was not released in that territory.

==== As featured artist ====
List of singles as featured artist, with selected chart positions, showing year released and album name
Title	Year	Peak chart positions		Album
Title	Year	ITA	SWI	Album
"Ti voglio bene Denver" (Cristina D'Avena featuring Lo Stato Sociale)	2018	—	—	Duets Forever: Tutti cantano Cristina
"Una canzone come gli 883" (DPCM Squad) (Note: Ensemble formed by Max Pezzali, Lo Stato Sociale, Cimini, Emis Killa, Eugenio in Via Di Gioia, Fast Animals and Slow Kids, Marco Giallini, J-Ax, Jake La Furia, La Pina, Pierluigi Pardo, Pinguini Tattici Nucleari and Nicola Savino.)	2020	—	—	Non-album single
"Lungomare" (Altre di B featuring Lo Stato Sociale)	2021	—	—	Sdeng
"Che sarà mai" (Legno featuring Lo Stato Sociale)	2021	—	—	Lato A
"Non la vedo bene" (Management featuring Lo Stato Sociale)	2023	—	—	Non-album single
"—" denotes a recording that did not chart or was not released in that territory.
