= Francesca Michielin discography =

Discography of Italian singer-songwriter Francesca Michielin

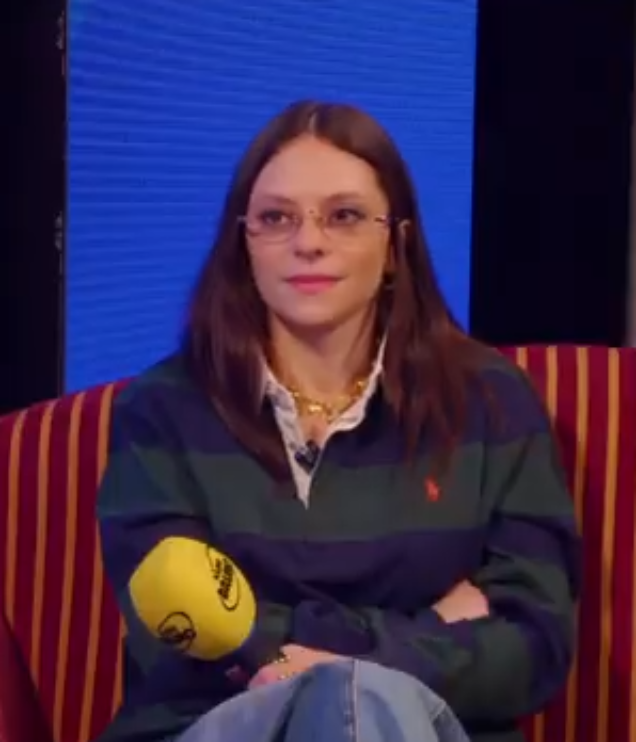
- Francesca Michielin in February 2025
- Studio albums: 6
- EPs: 3
- Singles: 43
- Music videos: 36

The discography of Italian singer-songwriter Francesca Michielin consists of six studio albums, three EPs, forty-three singles and thirty-six music videos.

Michielin's debut single, "Distratto", was released on 6 January 2012, after she won the fifth series of the Italian talent-show X Factor. The song peaked at number one on the Italian Singles Chart, and was featured on her first extended play, Distratto, which entered the top ten in Italy.

Michielin's first studio album, Riflessi di me, was released on 2 October 2012, preceded by the lead single "Sola". Other singles from the album were "Tutto quello che ho" and "Se cadrai". Michielin featured on Italian rapper Fedez's singles "Cigno nero" (2013) and "Magnifico" (2014), both of which achieved commercial success in Italy, being certified multi-platinum by the Federation of the Italian Music Industry.

Her second studio album, di20, was released on 23 October 2015, preceded by the singles "L'amore esiste", which became her second solo top-ten hit in Italy, "Battito di ciglia", and "Lontano". In 2016, after Michielin's debut at the Sanremo Music Festival, the album was re-released with the title di20are, reaching a new peak on the Italian FIMI chart, at number 3. The new edition featured the single "Nessun grado di separazione", released on 11 February 2016, which topped the charts in Italy. An acoustic live extended play, Nice to Meet You (Acoustic Live Solo), was also released on 30 January 2016.

Her third studio album, 2640, was released on 12 January 2018. It was preceded by the singles "Vulcano", released on 21 July 2017, and "Io non abito al mare", released on 17 November 2017. On 13 March 2020, she released her fourth studio album Feat (stato di natura), including the previous single "Cheyenne" and several collaborations with Elisa, Fabri Fibra, Måneskin, Charlie Charles, Max Gazzè and Carl Brave, among others. The album was re-released in 2021, with three additional tracks, including the number-one hit "Chiamami per nome", recorded with frequent collaborator Fedez.

== Studio albums ==
Title	Details	Peak chart positions		Certifications
Title	Details	ITA	SWI	Certifications
Riflessi di me	Released: 2 October 2012; Label: RCA; Format: CD, digital download	4	—	
di20 (Note: The album di20 was re-released in 2016 under the title di20are, with 4 additional tracks, including the single "Nessun grado di separazione".)	Released: 23 October 2015; Label: RCA; Format: CD, digital download	3	96	FIMI: Platinum
2640	Released: 12 January 2018; Label: Sony Music; Format: CD, 2 LP, digital download, streaming	2	64	FIMI: Gold
Feat (stato di natura) (Note: The album Feat (stato di natura) was re-released in 2021 under the title Feat (fuori dagli spazi), with 4 additional tracks, including the single "Chiamami per nome" (featuring Fedez).)	Released: 13 March 2020; Label: RCA; Format: CD, LP, digital download, streaming	7	—	FIMI: Gold
Cani sciolti	Released: 24 February 2023; Label: Columbia Records Italy; Format: CD, LP, digital download, streaming	14	—	
Magia bianca	Released: 12 June 2026; Label: Columbia Records Italy; Format: CD, LP, digital download, streaming	7	—	
"—" denotes a recording that did not chart or was not released.

== Extended plays ==
Title	Details	Peak chart positions
Title	Details	ITA
Distratto	Released: 24 January 2012; Label: Sony Music; Format: CD, digital download	9
Nice to Meet You (Acoustic Live Solo)	Released: 30 January 2016; Label: Sony Music; Format: digital download	52
Anime	Released: 3 October 2025; Label: Columbia, Sony Music; Format: CD, digital download, streaming	—
"—" denotes a recording that did not chart or was not released.

== Singles ==
=== As lead artist ===
Title	Year	Peak chart positions		Certifications	Album
Title	Year	ITA	SWI	Certifications	Album
"Distratto" (Note: "Distratto" also features on the EP Distratto.)	2012	1	—	FIMI: 2× Platinum	Riflessi di me
"Sola"	2012	13	—	FIMI: Gold	Riflessi di me
"Tutto quello che ho"	2012	—	—		Riflessi di me
"Se cadrai"	2013	—	—		Riflessi di me
"Amazing"	2014	54	—		The Amazing Spider-Man 2 - The Original Motion Picture Soundtrack (Note: "Amazing" was only included in the Italian version of the soundtrack album.)
"L'amore esiste"	2015	10	—	FIMI: 2× Platinum	di20
"Battito di ciglia"	2015	64	—	FIMI: Gold	di20
"Lontano"	2015	99	—		di20
"Nessun grado di separazione" (Note: "Nessun grado di separazione" was released in February 2016 in its original version. In March of the same year, a bilingual version of the single, "No Degree of Separation", was also released.)	2016	1	—	FIMI: 2× Platinum	di20are
"Un cuore in due"	2016	—	—	FIMI: Gold	di20are
"Almeno tu"	2016	—	—		di20are
"Vulcano"	2017	44	—	FIMI: Platinum	2640
"Io non abito al mare"	2017	15	—	FIMI: Platinum	2640
"Bolivia"	2018	—	—		2640
"Tropicale"	2018	—	—		2640
"Femme"	2018	—	—		2640
"Cheyenne" (featuring Charlie Charles)	2019	66	—	FIMI: Gold	Feat (stato di natura)
"Gange" (featuring Shiva)	2020	61	—		Feat (stato di natura)
"Riserva naturale" (featuring Coma_Cose)	2020	—	—		Feat (stato di natura)
"Monolocale" (featuring Fabri Fibra)	2020	—	—		Feat (stato di natura)
"Stato di natura" (featuring Måneskin)	2020	99	—		Feat (stato di natura)
"Cattive stelle" (featuring Vasco Brondi)	2021	—	—		Feat (fuori dagli spazi)
"Chiamami per nome" (with Fedez)	2021	1	19	FIMI: 3× Platinum	Feat (fuori dagli spazi)
"Cinema" (Samuel featuring Francesca Michielin)	2021	93	—	FIMI: Gold	Brigata bianca
"Nei tuoi occhi"	2021	—	—		Non-album single
"Bonsoir"	2022	—	—		Cani sciolti
"Occhi grandi grandi"	2022	—	—		Cani sciolti
"Un bosco"	2023	—	—		Cani sciolti
"Quello che ancora non c'è"	2023	—	—		Cani sciolti
"Disco dance" (with Gianmaria)	2023	—	—		Cani sciolti / Mostro
"Fulmini addosso"	2023	—	—		Cani sciolti
"Solite chiacchiere"	2023	—	—		Non-album singles
"Christmas Party"	2024	7	—		Non-album singles
"Fango in paradiso"	2025	24	—		Anime
"Francesca"	2025	—	—		Anime
"È naturale" (featuring Planet Funk)	2025	—	—		Anime
"Una donna non può"	2026	—	—		Magia bianca
"—" denotes a recording that did not chart or was not released.

=== As featured artist ===
Title	Year	Peak chart positions	Certifications	Album
Title	Year	ITA	Certifications	Album
"Cigno nero" (Fedez featuring Francesca Michielin)	2013	8	FIMI: 2× Platinum	Sig. Brainwash − L'arte di accontentare
"Magnifico" (Fedez featuring Francesca Michielin)	2014	1	FIMI: 6× Platinum	Pop-Hoolista
"Fotografia" (Carl Brave featuring Francesca Michielin and Fabri Fibra)	2018	6	FIMI: 3× Platinum	Notti brave
"Glorious" (James Morrison featuring Francesca Michielin)	2019	—		You're Stronger Than You Know (Note: "Glorious" is only included in the Italian version of You're Stronger Than You Know.)
"Immagina" (Fudasca featuring Tredici Pietro, Francesca Michielin and Mecna)	2024	—		Non-album singles
"Ballavi" (Kaput featuring Francesca Michielin)	2025	—		Non-album singles
"—" denotes a recording that did not chart or was not released.

== Other charted songs ==
Title	Year	Peak chart positions	Album
Title	Year	ITA	Album
"Whole Lotta Love"	2012	53	Distratto
"Someone like You"	2012	67	Distratto
"Liberi" (Fabri Fibra featuring Francesca Michielin)	2022	37	Caos

== Album and soundtrack appearances ==
Title	Year	Album
"God Rest Ye Merry Gentlemen"	2014	X Factor Christmas 2014
"Le nostre ali" (Don Joe featuring Francesca Michielin)	2015	Ora o mai più
"Tu sei una favola"	2017	Ballerina (soundtrack of the Italian-language version)
"Non dimentico più" (Syria featuring Francesca Michielin)	2017	Io+Io
"L'incantevole Creamy" (Cristina D'Avena featuring Francesca Michielin)	2017	Duets - Tutti cantano Cristina
"Il mio posto a Slaughter Race"	2018	Ralph Spacca Internet (Colonna Sonora Originale)
"Gioco di bimba" (Le Orme featuring Francesca Michielin)	2019	Sulle ali di un sogno
"Vestito bianco" (Mecna featuring Francesca Michielin)	2021	Mentre nessuno guarda (Deluxe Edition)
"Ginga" (Gaia featuring Francesca Michielin and Margherita Vicario)	2021	Alma
"La presa b e la presa male" (Bresh & Shune featuring Francesca Michielin)	2022	Oro blu
"Guai" (Hu featuring Francesca Michielin)	2022	Numeri primi
"Liberi" (Fabri Fibra featuring Francesca Michielin)	2022	Caos
"In cima" (Eugenio in Via Di Gioia featuring Francesca Michielin)	2022	Amore e rivoluzione
"A capo il mondo" (Federica Abbate featuring Francesca Michielin)	2023	Canzoni per gli altri
"La storia non si deve ripetere" (Fiorella Mannoia featuring Francesca Michielin and Federica Abbate)	2024	Disobbedire
"Red Flag" (Estremo featuring Francesca Michielin)	2024	Era
"Tuttelestelle" (Neffa featuring Ele A and Francesca Michielin)	2025	Canerandagio - parte 1

== Music videos ==
Title	Year	Director(s)
"Distratto"	2012	Stefano Sollima
"Sola"	2012	Marco Salom
"Tutto quello che ho"	2012	Marco Salom
"Se cadrai"	2013	Marco Salom
"Cigno nero"	2013	Fabio Berton
"Amazing"	2014	Gaetano Morbioli
"Magnifico"	2014	Cosimo Alemà
"L'amore esiste"	2015	Giacomo Triglia
"Battito di ciglia"	2015	Giacomo Triglia
"Lontano"	2015	Giacomo Triglia
"25 febbraio"	2015	Giacomo Triglia
"Nessun grado di separazione"	2016	Giacomo Triglia
"No Degree of Separation"	2016	Giacomo Triglia
"Un cuore in due"	2016	Giacomo Triglia
"Almeno tu"	2016	Roan Johnson
"Vulcano"	2017	Giacomo Triglia
"Io non abito al mare"	2017	Giacomo Triglia
"Bolivia"	2018	Giacomo Triglia
"Fotografia"	2018	Dan & Dav
"Tropicale"	2018	Giacomo Triglia
"Cheyenne"	2019	Jacopo Farina
"Stato di natura"	2020	Giacomo Triglia
"Monolocale"	2020	Giacomo Triglia
"Chiamami per nome"	2021	YouNuts!
"Cinema"	2021	Giacomo Triglia
"Nei tuoi occhi"	2021	Giacomo Triglia
"Bonsoir"	2022	Shipmate
"Quello che ancora non c'è"	2023	Beppe Gallo
"Disco Dance"	2023	Giacomo Triglia
"Fulmini addosso"	2023	Giacomo Triglia
"Solite chiacchiere"	2023	Giacomo Triglia
"Immagina"	2024	Nicolò Bassetto
"Fango in paradiso"	2025	Giacomo Triglia
"Francesca"	2025	Danilo Bubani
"È naturale"	2025	Alessandro Porri
"Una donna non può"	2026	The Rings
