= List of number-one hits of 2021 (Italy) =

This is a list of the number-one hits of 2021 on Italy's Singles and Albums Charts, ranked by the Federazione Industria Musicale Italiana (FIMI).

== Chart history ==
Week	Issue date	Song	Artist(s)	Ref.	Album	Artist(s)	Ref.
1	1 January	"Una canzone d'amore buttata via"	Vasco Rossi		Famoso	Sfera Ebbasta	
2	8 January	"Allenamento #4"	Capo Plaza		Famoso	Sfera Ebbasta	
3	15 January	"La canzone nostra"	Mace, Blanco and Salmo		Famoso	Sfera Ebbasta	
4	22 January	"La canzone nostra"	Mace, Blanco and Salmo		Plaza	Capo Plaza	
5	29 January	"La canzone nostra"	Mace, Blanco and Salmo		La geografia del buio	Michele Bravi	
6	5 February	"La canzone nostra"	Mace, Blanco and Salmo		Obe	Mace	
7	12 February	"La canzone nostra"	Mace, Blanco and Salmo		OK	Gazzelle	
8	19 February	"La canzone nostra"	Mace, Blanco and Salmo		Ali	Il Tre	
9	26 February	"La canzone nostra"	Mace, Blanco and Salmo		17: Dark Edition	Emis Killa and Jake La Furia	
10	5 March	"Chiamami per nome"	Francesca Michielin and Fedez		Bro (Amici 2021)	Various artists	
11	12 March	"Musica leggerissima"	Colapesce and Dimartino		Tribù urbana	Ermal Meta	
12	19 March	"Musica leggerissima"	Colapesce and Dimartino		Teatro d'ira: Vol. 1	Måneskin	
13	26 March	"Musica leggerissima"	Colapesce and Dimartino		Solo tutto	Massimo Pericolo	
14	2 April	"Musica leggerissima"	Colapesce and Dimartino		Madame	Madame	
15	9 April	"Musica leggerissima"	Colapesce and Dimartino		Fastlife 4	Gué Pequeno and DJ Harsh	
16	16 April	"Musica leggerissima"	Colapesce and Dimartino		Lauro	Achille Lauro	
17	23 April	"Musica leggerissima"	Colapesce and Dimartino		Multisala	Franco126	
18	30 April	"Nuovo Range"	Rkomi, Sfera Ebbasta and Junior K		Taxi Driver	Rkomi	
19	7 May	"Nuovo Range"	Rkomi, Sfera Ebbasta and Junior K		Exuvia	Caparezza	
20	14 May	"Malibu"	Sangiovanni		Sangiovanni	Sangiovanni	
21	21 May	"Malibu"	Sangiovanni		Sangiovanni	Sangiovanni	
22	28 May	"Malibu"	Sangiovanni		Sangiovanni	Sangiovanni	
23	4 June	"Malibu"	Sangiovanni		Untouchable	Tony Effe	
24	11 June	"Mille"	Fedez, Achille Lauro and Orietta Berti		Sangiovanni	Sangiovanni	
25	18 June	"Mille"	Fedez, Achille Lauro and Orietta Berti		Sangiovanni	Sangiovanni	
26	25 June	"Mille"	Fedez, Achille Lauro and Orietta Berti		Sangiovanni	Sangiovanni	
27	2 July	"Mille"	Fedez, Achille Lauro and Orietta Berti		Teatro d'ira: Vol. 1	Måneskin	
28	9 July	"Mille"	Fedez, Achille Lauro and Orietta Berti		Teatro d'ira: Vol. 1	Måneskin	
29	16 July	"Mi fai impazzire"	Blanco and Sfera Ebbasta		Teatro d'ira: Vol. 1	Måneskin	
30	23 July	"Mi fai impazzire"	Blanco and Sfera Ebbasta		Keta Music Vol. 3	Emis Killa	
31	30 July	"Mi fai impazzire"	Blanco and Sfera Ebbasta		Happier Than Ever	Billie Eilish	
32	6 August	"Mi fai impazzire"	Blanco and Sfera Ebbasta		Taxi Driver	Rkomi	
33	13 August	"Mi fai impazzire"	Blanco and Sfera Ebbasta		Taxi Driver	Rkomi	
34	20 August	"Mi fai impazzire"	Blanco and Sfera Ebbasta		Taxi Driver	Rkomi	
35	27 August	"Mi fai impazzire"	Blanco and Sfera Ebbasta		Donda	Kanye West	
36	3 September	"Mi fai impazzire"	Blanco and Sfera Ebbasta		Senjutsu	Iron Maiden	
37	10 September	"Blu celeste"	Blanco		Blu celeste	Blanco	
38	17 September	"Blu celeste"	Blanco		Blu celeste	Blanco	
39	24 September	"Meglio del cinema"	Fedez		Blu celeste	Blanco	
40	1 October	"Kumite"	Salmo		Flop	Salmo	
41	8 October	"Kumite"	Salmo		Flop	Salmo	
42	15 October	"Easy on Me"	Adele		Flop	Salmo	
43	22 October	"Kumite"	Salmo		Solo	Ultimo	
44	29 October	"Kumite"	Salmo		=	Ed Sheeran	
45	5 November	"Kumite"	Salmo		Rivoluzione	Rocco Hunt	
46	12 November	"Kumite"	Salmo		Siamo qui	Vasco Rossi	
47	19 November	"∞ Love"	Marracash and Gué Pequeno		Noi, loro, gli altri	Marracash	
48	26 November	"∞ Love"	Marracash and Gué Pequeno		Disumano	Fedez	
49	3 December	"∞ Love"	Marracash and Gué Pequeno		Noi, loro, gli altri	Marracash	
50	10 December	"∞ Love"	Marracash and Gué Pequeno		Gvesvs	Gué Pequeno	
51	17 December	"∞ Love"	Marracash and Gué Pequeno		Noi, loro, gli altri	Marracash	
52	24 December	"All I Want for Christmas Is You"	Mariah Carey		Noi, loro, gli altri	Marracash	

== See also ==
- 2021 in music
- List of number-one hits in Italy
