= List of number-one hits of 2017 (Italy) =

This is a list of the number-one hits of 2017 on Italy's Singles and Albums Charts, ranked by FIMI.

Week	Issue date	Song	Artist(s)	Ref.	Album	Artist(s)	Ref.
1	6 January	"Shape of You"	Ed Sheeran		Le Migliori	Mina & Celentano	
2	13 January	"Shape of You"	Ed Sheeran		Apriti cielo	Mannarino	
3	20 January	"Shape of You"	Ed Sheeran		Comunisti col Rolex	J-Ax and Fedez	
4	27 January	"Shape of You"	Ed Sheeran		Comunisti col Rolex	J-Ax and Fedez	
5	3 February	"Shape of You"	Ed Sheeran		Comunisti col Rolex	J-Ax and Fedez	
6	10 February	"Occidentali's Karma"	Francesco Gabbani		Il mestiere della vita	Tiziano Ferro	
7	17 February	"Occidentali's Karma"	Francesco Gabbani		Vietato morire	Ermal Meta	
8	24 February	"Occidentali's Karma"	Francesco Gabbani		Anime di carta	Michele Bravi	
9	3 March	"Shape of You"	Ed Sheeran		÷	Ed Sheeran	
10	10 March	"Shape of You"	Ed Sheeran		÷	Ed Sheeran	
11	17 March	"Despacito"	Luis Fonsi featuring Daddy Yankee		Spirit	Depeche Mode	
12	24 March	"Despacito"	Luis Fonsi featuring Daddy Yankee		Spirit	Depeche Mode	
13	31 March	"Despacito"	Luis Fonsi featuring Daddy Yankee		Automaton	Jamiroquai	
14	7 April	"Despacito"	Luis Fonsi featuring Daddy Yankee		Fenomeno	Fabri Fibra	
15	14 April	"Despacito"	Luis Fonsi featuring Daddy Yankee		Fenomeno	Fabri Fibra	
16	21 April	"Despacito"	Luis Fonsi featuring Daddy Yankee		Fenomeno	Fabri Fibra	
17	28 April	"Despacito"	Luis Fonsi featuring Daddy Yankee		Magellano	Francesco Gabbani	
18	5 May	"Despacito"	Luis Fonsi featuring Daddy Yankee		Pizzicato	Izi	
19	12 May	"Despacito"	Luis Fonsi featuring Daddy Yankee		Zerovskij...Solo per amore	Zero Renato	
20	19 May	"Despacito"	Luis Fonsi featuring Daddy Yankee		Perdo le parole	Riki	
21	26 May	"Despacito"	Luis Fonsi featuring Daddy Yankee		Perdo le parole	Riki	
22	2 June	"Despacito"	Luis Fonsi featuring Daddy Yankee		Perdo le parole	Riki	
23	9 June	"Tran tran"	Sfera Ebbasta		Perdo le parole	Riki	
24	16 June	"Despacito"	Luis Fonsi featuring Daddy Yankee		Perdo le parole	Riki	
25	23 June	"Despacito"	Luis Fonsi featuring Daddy Yankee		Twins	Dark Polo Gang	
26	30 June	"Senza pagare"	J-Ax and Fedez featuring T-Pain		Gentleman	Guè Pequeno	
27	7 July	"Senza pagare"	J-Ax and Fedez featuring T-Pain		Gentleman	Guè Pequeno	
28	14 July	"Senza pagare"	J-Ax and Fedez featuring T-Pain		Perdo le parole	Riki	
29	21 July	"Senza pagare"	J-Ax and Fedez featuring T-Pain		Perdo le parole	Riki	
30	28 July	"Senza pagare"	J-Ax and Fedez featuring T-Pain		Perdo le parole	Riki	
31	4 August	"Riccione"	Thegiornalisti		Kaleidoscope	Coldplay	
32	11 August	"Senza pagare"	J-Ax and Fedez featuring T-Pain		Kaleidoscope	Coldplay	
33	18 August	"Senza pagare"	J-Ax and Fedez featuring T-Pain		Gentleman	Guè Pequeno	
34	25 August	"Senza pagare"	J-Ax and Fedez featuring T-Pain		Gentleman	Guè Pequeno	
35	1 September	"Senza pagare"	J-Ax and Fedez featuring T-Pain		Ogni maledetto giorno	Mostro	
36	8 September	"Senza pagare"	J-Ax and Fedez featuring T-Pain		Io in terra	Rkomi	
37	15 September	"Mi Gente"	J Balvin and Willy William		Prisoner 709	Caparezza	
38	22 September	"Lamborghini"	Guè Pequeno featuring Sfera Ebbasta		Prisoner 709	Caparezza	
39	29 September	"La musica non c'è"	Coez		Live at Pompeii	David Gilmour	
40	6 October	"La musica non c'è"	Coez		Masters	Lucio Battisti	
41	13 October	"La musica non c'è"	Coez		Thomas	Thomas	
42	20 October	"La musica non c'è"	Coez		Mania	Riki	
43	27 October	"La musica non c'è"	Coez		Mania	Riki	
44	3 November	"La musica non c'è"	Coez		Mania	Riki	
45	10 November	"La musica non c'è"	Coez		Duets – Tutti cantano Cristina	Cristina D'Avena	
46	17 November	"La musica non c'è"	Coez		Amore che torni	Negramaro	
47	24 November	"Perdonami"	Salmo		Possibili scenari	Cesare Cremonini	
48	1 December	"Perfect"	Ed Sheeran		Oh, vita!	Jovanotti	
49	8 December	"Perfect"	Ed Sheeran		Vasco Modena Park	Vasco Rossi	
50	15 December	"Perfect"	Ed Sheeran		Vasco Modena Park	Vasco Rossi	
51	22 December	"Perfect"	Ed Sheeran		Vasco Modena Park	Vasco Rossi	
52	29 December	"Perfect"	Ed Sheeran		Vasco Modena Park	Vasco Rossi	

== See also ==
- 2017 in music
- List of number-one hits in Italy
