= Fango in paradiso =

Single by Francesca Michielin
- Language: Italian
- Released: 12 February 2025
- Genre: Pop
- Length: 3:29
- Label: Columbia
- Songwriters: Francesca Michielin; Davide Simonetta; Alessandro Raina
- Producer: Simonetta

Francesca Michielin singles chronology
"Christmas Party" (2024)	"Fango in paradiso" (2025)	"Francesca" (2025)

Music video
- "La cura per me" on YouTube

"Fango in paradiso" ("Mud in Paradise") is a song recorded by Italian singer Francesca Michielin. It was released on 12 February 2025 through Columbia Records.

The song competed at the Sanremo Music Festival 2025, ultimately finishing 21st. It marked the singer's third participation on the contest, the first since "Chiamami per nome" in 2021 with Fedez.

== Background and composition ==
The song is written and composed by the singer-songwriter herself with Davide Simonetta, who also figured as producer, and Alessandro Raina. It was described in a press conference interview:

""Fango in paradiso" is a love song, it's a love story that has ended or is somehow ending, and basically there is so much heartbreak, I couldn't say more. One will say, whatever, everybody sings love songs, but actually I had never written or interpreted a love song like that. The image in my opinion that can describe this song is ivy, ivy is also present in the lyrics, it is a climbing plant, a thing that goes to cover things. And even though it's mega charming on the dwellings anyway it gives you a sense of a place maybe uninhabited, a place where you don't hang out anymore, where you don't talk to each other anymore, so this dishabituation that is created in the relationship."

== Critical reception ==
"Fango in paradiso" received positive or mixed reviews from music critics.

Andrea Laffranchi of Corriere della Sera wrote that there is "elegance" in Michielin's sounds and voice, describing the song "a ballad that opens with a crescendo", whose lyrics turn out to be "one of the few lyrics with non-worn images". the song sounds like "the follow-up to "Nessun grado di separazione" but whose refrain instead comes across as "sour". Andrea Silenzi of La Repubblica appreciated the "irregular but not trivial" melody, finding that "the construction has its own originality", despite the fact that the theme of the lyrics is not innovative.

== Music video ==
The video for the song was released on February 12, 2025, on the singer's official YouTube channel. The video was directed of Giacomo Triglia, starring Michielin herself with Maziar Firouzi, and features a cameo by Spanish racing driver Fernando Alonso.

== Charts ==
Chart performance for "Fango in paradiso"
Chart (2025)	Peak position
Italy (FIMI)	24
Italy (EarOne Airplay)	44
