= Magnifico =

Magnifico is a term for a powerful man, especially in the historical Republic of Venice. It may (also) refer to the following:

- Lorenzo de' Medici (1449 – 1492) known as Lorenzo the Magnificent (Lorenzo il Magnifico)
- Walter Magnifico (born 1961), Italian basketball player
- Magnifico (musician) (born Robert Pešut in 1965), Slovenian singer
- Magnifico (film), a film from the Philippines that won the Jury Prize at the Berlin International Film Festival
- "Magnifico" (song), a song recorded by Italian rapper Fedez, featuring vocals from Francesca Michielin
- Magnifico, an alias used by the Mule (Foundation), a major character in Isaac Asimov's Foundation series of novels
- Juandissimo Magnifico, a character in the animated television show The Fairly OddParents
- King Magnifico, a character in the animated film Wish
- Mr. Magnifico, a character in the animated television show Kim Possible

== See also ==
- "Bohemian Rhapsody", a 1975 song by Queen
