= Cani sciolti =

Studio album by Francesca Michielin
- Released: 24 February 2023
- Recorded: 2016–2022
- Genre: Pop; rock; electropop
- Length: 37:09
- Label: Columbia Records
- Producer: Francesca Michielin; E.D.D.; Zef; B-Croma; B. Ventura; Massimo Colagiovanni; Dorado Inc; Enrico Brun; Giovanni Pallotti; Francesco Fugazza

Francesca Michielin chronology
Feat (stato di natura) (2020)	Cani sciolti (2023)

Singles from Cani sciolti
- 1. "Bonsoir" Released: 1 July 2022; 2. "Occhi grandi grandi" Released: 9 September 2022; 3. "Un bosco" Released: 17 February 2023; 4. "Quello che ancora non c'è" Released: 24 February 2023; 5. "Disco dance" Released: 28 April 2023; 6. "Fulmini addosso" Released: 9 June 2023

Cani sciolti is the fifth studio album by Italian singer-songwriter Francesca Michielin, released by Columbia Records on 24 February 2023.

The album was entirely written and produced by Michielin, dealing with themes such as love, homosexuality, religion, racism and feminism and the life between countryside and cities. It includes the song "Fulmini addosso", lead track from the soundtrack of Italian comedy film L'estate più calda directed by Matteo Pilati.

== Background ==
After her participation in the 71st Sanremo Music Festival with the duet "Chiamami per nome" with Fedez and the re-release of the album Feat (stato di natura), between 2021 and 2022 Michielin collaborated as a songwriter and producer in different record projects, including in Alma by Gaia, Oro blu by Bresh and in Caos by Fabri Fibra.

In an interview granted to the daily newspaper Il Messaggero, Michielin recounted that she turned to a psychologist in the time before and after participating in the festival: "In 2021 I went to analysis, before Sanremo. If in 2016 I was the ramshackle 20-year-old, when I came back two years ago I felt like an old woman compared to Madame and other younger artists."

== Composition and conception ==
"It's a genuine record that comes after years of writing; [...] and it's the first time I've written everything myself. I followed every step of it, helped by my collaborators in a beautiful teamwork and I am happy because I put my whole self into it. [...] Loose dogs are those who don't stay within a predefined pattern, those who don't stay within a current. They are free to express themselves. I wanted to take the luxury of this freedom and be one hundred per cent myself by writing songs that were even braver than usual. Loose is a word that comes from the Latin absolutum. An absolute song for me has to be just a song, without any references or predetermined rules. I started from the composition of what I wanted to say. [...] We should never forget that we make pop to communicate, not to talk about ourselves. We artists are a medium. And the stories we tell become someone else's stories, which can save someone. But sometimes we forget this ability to communicate and we put ourselves before the message we want to give because we have to please. Here, for me we don't just have to please, we also have to be on the dick. I'm not aggressive, but I want the songs to also be food for thought."

— Francesca Michielin about the album conception

The album includes thirteen tracks, written and composed by the singer herself since 2016.[5] For the production and writing Michielin was joined by different authors and producers, including Federica Abbate, Dardust, Tropico, Fulminacci, Vasco Brondi, Enrico Brun, Colapesce, Zeff and E.D.D. . The songs deal with different themes, both biographical, such as the difference between living in the province in Bassano del Grappa and the experience of living between cities such as Padua and Milan; the album also deals with themes such as love, homosexuality, religion, racism and feminism. In an interview with Billboard Italia, Michielin citied Carmen Consoli as the primary inspiration for the record project and for the song "Carmen".

== Reception ==
Mattia Marzi of Rockol found that through the album the singer "reappropriates a more songwriter, intimist and reflective dimension", bringing out "her riot attitude; [...] because you can't be complacent all the time". Marzi stressed that "so in focus, she had never been", explaining "in words and music her personal and artistic maturity".

Giada Borioli of Grazia described the album as "intimate and personal, sincere and unashamed", becoming "a metaphor for the work behind this great project that has matured over time". The journalist defined the songs as "naked and raw" and "devoid of superstructures" consisting of "phrases that, extrapolated, lend themselves to being enough for themselves".

Alberto Muraro of All Music Italia wrote that Cani sciolti is a transposition of 'personalities against the tide, who don't necessarily want to fit in with the mainstream'. Although some tracks present an "aggressive" tone, with "sounds with a grunk and rock flavour", Muraro considered that most of the album focuses both on "sweeter and more romantic sounds" and "on the relationship between the city and the province". For the same site, Simone Caprioli gave it a score of 8/10, calling it the singer's "most authentic and interesting" album and "a splendid reality of an increasingly bare songwriting". The project is "powerful for its courage to tell something different and singular in a time of habituation and redundancy" and "full of images that refer to nature in all its forms and to a more sustainable human dimension".

== Track listing ==
All music and all lyrics are composed and written by Francesca Michielin, except where otherwise indicated.

Standard edition
No.	Title	Writer(s)	Producer(s)	Length
1.	"Occhi grandi grandi"	Davide Petrella; Stefano Tognini; Michielin	E.D.D.; Zef; Michielin	3:07
2.	"Un bosco"		E.D.D.; B-croma; Michielin	3:24
3.	"Padova può ucciderti più di Milano"		E.D.D.; Michielin	3:59
4.	"Ghetto perfetto"	Filippo Uttinacci; Michielin	E.D.D.; Benjamin Ventura; Michielin	2:32
5.	"Quello che ancora non c'è"		E.D.D.; Massimo Colagiovanni; Michielin	3:12
6.	"Piccola città"	Vasco Brondi; Michielin	E.D.D.; B-croma; Michielin	4:04
7.	"Bonsoir"	Dario Faini; Lorenzo Urciullo; Michielin	Enrico Brun; Dorado Inc.; Michielin	3:21
8.	"Verbena"		E.D.D.; Francesco Fugazza; Michielin	4:02
9.	"Carmen"		E.D.D.; Francesca Fugazza; Michielin	3:56
10.	"Non sono io la tua solitudine"		E.D.D.; Michielin	3:14
11.	"Claudia"	Federica Abbate; Jacopo Ettore; Michielin	E.D.D.; Michielin	3:56
12.	"D.punto"		Francesca Fugazza; Michielin	3:03

Cani sciolti streaming track edition
No.	Title	Lyrics	Producer(s)	Length
1.	"Disco dance" (featuring Gianmaria)	Antonio Filippelli; Gianmarco Manilardi; Gianmaria Volpato; Nicolas Biasin; Michielin	Antonio Filippelli; Gianmarco Manilardi; Nicolas Biasin	4:03
2.	"Fulmini addosso"	Alessandro La Cava; Eugenio Maimone; Federico Mercuri; Giordano Cremona; Leonardo Grillotti; Michielin	ITACA	3:41
3.	"Quello che ancora non c'è (Radio Edition)"			3:08
Total length:				51:28

== Charts ==
Sales chart performance for Cani sciolti
Chart (2023)	Peak position
Italian Albums (FIMI)	14
