= Alessandro Raina =

Italian lyricist and composer (born 1977)

- Born: 29 June 1977 (age 48); Voghera, Italy
- Occupations: Lyricist; Composer

Alessandro Raina (born 29 June 1977) is an Italian lyricist, composer and singer-songwriter.

== Life and career ==
Born in Voghera, in the late 1990s Raina started working as a freelance musical journalist, collaborating among others with Time Out, Blow Up, Rumore, Rockstar, and Pulp. In 1999, he made his record debut as Colonia Paradi'es, with a concept album about the history of Montalto Pavese. After being a member of the group Giardini di Mirò, with whom he released the album Punk... Not Diet!, and following a collaboration with the electronic music project nOOrda, in 2006, he released his second solo album, Nema fictione.

In 2007, Raina co-founded the rock group Amor Fou, with whom he released three albums and an EP. The group disbanded in 2012. Between 2011 and 2013, Raina became a close collaborator of Colapesce, touring with him and forming the musical project Santiago.

Starting from 2012, following the success of Malika Ayane's "Tre cose", Raina is mainly active as a songwriter. Among the hits he penned, were Thegiornalisti's "Riccione", Tananai's "Tango", and Fedez & Francesca Michielin's "Chiamami per nome", which ranked second at the 71st Sanremo Music Festival. His songwriting collaborations include Luca Carboni, Elisa, Mahmood, Marco Mengoni, Annalisa, Elodie, Giusy Ferreri, Emma Marrone, Biagio Antonacci, The Kolors, Guè, Club Dogo, Paola Turci, Raphael Gualazzi, Michele Bravi, Massimo Pericolo and Deborah Iurato.

== Discography ==
=== Album ===
- 1999 – Colonia Paradi'es
- 2006 – Nema Fictzione
