= 2640 =

2640 may refer to:

- 2640 (album), by Francesca Michielin (2018)
- 2640, a year in the 27th century
