= Feat (stato di natura) =

Studio album by Francesca Michielin
- Released: 13 March 2020
- Recorded: 2018–2019
- Studio: Milan
- Genre: Pop rock
- Length: 34:58
- Label: RCA Records
- Producer: Tommaso Colliva; Dardust; Takagi & Ketra; Carl Brave; Charlie Charles

Francesca Michielin chronology
2640 (2018)	Feat (stato di natura) (2020)	Cani sciolti (2023)

Singles from Feat (stato di natura)
- 1. "Cheyenne" Released: 15 November 2019; 2. "Gange" Released: 21 February 2020; 3. "Riserva naturale" Released: 28 February 2020; 4. "Monolocale" Released: 6 March 2020; 5. "Stato di natura" Released: 13 March 2020

Singles from Feat (Fuori dagli spazi)
- 1. "Cattive stelle" Released: 22 January 2021; 2. "Chiamami per nome" Released: 3 March 2021

Feat (stato di natura) is the fourth studio album by Italian singer-songwriter Francesca Michielin, released by RCA Records on 13 March 2020. A reissue of the album, titled Feat (fuori dagli spazi), followed on 5 March 2021. The new edition of the album, which was released following Michielin's participation in the 71st Sanremo Music Festival as part of a duo with Fedez, features new collaborations, including Michielin and Fedez's Sanremo entry "Chiamami per nome", and "Cattive stelle", written and performed with Vasco Brondi.

== Singles ==
"Cheyenne" was released as the lead single from the album on 15 November 2019. The song peaked at number 66 on the Italian Singles Chart.

On 13 February 2020, Michielin announced that the album's release would be anticipated by three concerts, each with a different location, theme and arrangement, to take place on 20 February, 27 February and 5 March 2020 in Milan. A new song from Feat (stato di natura) was premiered at each concert and released the following day. The first concert took place at the Rocket nightclub, with a vintage electro theme and the premiere of the song "Gange", featuring the Italian rapper Shiva. "Gange" was released on the following day, 21 February. The song peaked at number 61 on the Italian Singles Chart, becoming the album's highest peaking track. The second concert was planned to take place at the Serraglio nightclub, with an urban orchestral theme and the premiere of the song "Riserva naturale", featuring Italian duo Coma Cose. On 24 February, the event was cancelled in accordance with measures intended to prevent the spread of the coronavirus in Lombardy, with Michielin later announcing that the concert would be live-streamed on Facebook instead. The third concert was broadcast on RaiPlay on 5 March 2020 and included the live debut of the song "Monolocale" featuring Fabri Fibra.

The album's title track "Stato di natura" was released as the second single from the album on 13 March 2020, peaking at number 99 on the Italian Singles Chart. On 3 April 2020, "Monolocale" was sent to Italian radios as the album's third single.

== Track listing ==
Standard edition
No.	Title	Writer(s)	Producer(s)	Length
1.	"Stato di natura" (featuring Måneskin)	Francesca Michielin; Damiano David; Victoria De Angelis; Thomas Raggi; Ethan Torchio; Ramiro Levy	Tommaso Colliva	2:05
2.	"Monolocale" (featuring Fabri Fibra)	Michielin; Fabrizio Tarducci; Daniele Dezi; Daniele Mungai	Frenetik&Orang3	3:24
3.	"Sposerò un albero" (featuring Gemitaiz)	Michielin; Davide De Luca; Dezi; Mungai; Valerio Smordoni	Frenetik&Orang3	3:04
4.	"Gange" (featuring Shiva)	Michielin; Shiva; Adam11	Davide Maddalena	3:03
5.	"Yo no tengo nada" (featuring Elisa and Dardust)	Michielin; Dario Faini; Elisa Toffoli	Dardust	3:06
6.	"Riserva naturale" (featuring Coma_Cose)	Michielin; Francesca Mesiano; Fausto Zanardelli; Dezi; Mungai; Smordoni	Frenetik&Orang3	3:05
7.	"Acqua e sapone" (featuring Takagi & Ketra and Fred De Palma)	Takagi & Ketra; Tommaso Paradiso; Federico Palana	Takagi & Ketra	3:15
8.	"La vie ensemble" (featuring Max Gazzè)	Michielin; Fortunato Zampaglione	Fabrizio Ferraguzzo; Enrico Brun	2:47
9.	"Star Trek" (featuring Carl Brave)	Michielin; Carl Brave	Carl Brave	3:51
10.	"Cheyenne" (featuring Charlie Charles)	Alessandro Mahmoud; Alessandro Raina; Charlie Charles; Davide Simonetta	Charlie Charles	3:25
11.	"Leoni" (featuring Giorgio Poi)	Giorgio Poi	Poi	3:49
Total length:				34:58

FEAT: Fuori dagli spazi
No.	Title	Writer(s)	Producer(s)	Length
1.	"Chiamami per nome" (featuring Fedez)	Michielin; Mahmoud; Raina; Simonetta; Federico Lucia; Jacopo Matteo Luca D'amico	d.whale	3:42
2.	"Cattive stelle" (featuring Vasco Brondi)	Michielin; Brondi	Taketo Gohara	3:31
3.	"Monolocale" (featuring Fabri Fibra)			3:24
4.	"Yo no tengo nada" (featuring Elisa and Dardust)			3:06
5.	"Se fossi" (featuring Mecna)	Michielin; Corrado Grilli; Zampaglione; Rosario Castagnola; Sarah Startuffo	D-Ross Startuffo	3:15
6.	"Star Trek" (featuring Carl Brave)			3:51
7.	"Cheyenne" (featuring Charlie Charles)			3:25
8.	"Pole Position" (featuring Colapesce)	Michielin; Lorenzo Urciullo; Federico Nardelli	Nardelli	3:22
9.	"Sposerò un albero" (featuring Gemitaiz)			3:04
10.	"La vie ensemble" (featuring Max Gazzè)			2:47
11.	"Acqua e sapone" (featuring Takagi & Ketra and Fred De Palma)			3:15
12.	"Leoni" (featuring Giorgio Poi)			3:49
13.	"Gange" (featuring Shiva)			3:03
14.	"Riserva naturale" (featuring Coma_Cose)			3:05
15.	"Stato di natura" (featuring Måneskin)			2:05

Notes

- All track titles stylized in all caps.

== Charts ==
Sales chart performance for Feat (stato di natura)
Chart (2020)	Peak position
Italian Albums (FIMI)	7

== Certifications ==
Region	Certification	Certified units/sales
Italy (FIMI)	Gold	25,000^{‡}
^{‡} Sales+streaming figures based on certification alone.
