= Meglio del cinema =

Single by Fedez

from the album Disumano
- Released: 24 September 2021
- Genre: Pop
- Length: 3:08
- Label: Sony
- Songwriters: Federico Lucia; Jacopo D'Amico; Davide Simonetta
- Producers: Dargen D'Amico; Davide Simonetta

Fedez singles chronology
"Mille" (2021)	"Meglio del cinema" (2021)	"Morire morire" (2021)

Music video
- "Meglio del cinema" on YouTube

"Meglio del cinema" (transl. Better than cinema) is a song co-written and recorded by Italian rapper Fedez. It was released on 24 September 2021 as the fifth single from his sixth studio album Disumano.

It was written by the rapper with co-writing contribution by Dargen D'Amico and Davide Simonetta, who also served as producers. The song is dedicated to his wife Chiara Ferragni and describes the beauty of a couple's everyday life. It peaked at number one on the FIMI Singles Chart.

== Music video ==
A music video for "Meglio del cinema", directed by Daniele Bagolin, was released on YouTube on 30 September 2021.

== Charts ==
Weekly chart performance for "Meglio del cinema"
Chart (2021)	Peak position
Italy (FIMI)	1
Italy Airplay (EarOne)	15
Switzerland (Schweizer Hitparade)	92

== Certifications ==
Certifications for "Meglio del cinema"
Region	Certification	Certified units/sales
Italy (FIMI)	Platinum	70,000^{‡}
^{‡} Sales+streaming figures based on certification alone.
