= Giardini di Mirò =

Italian rock band

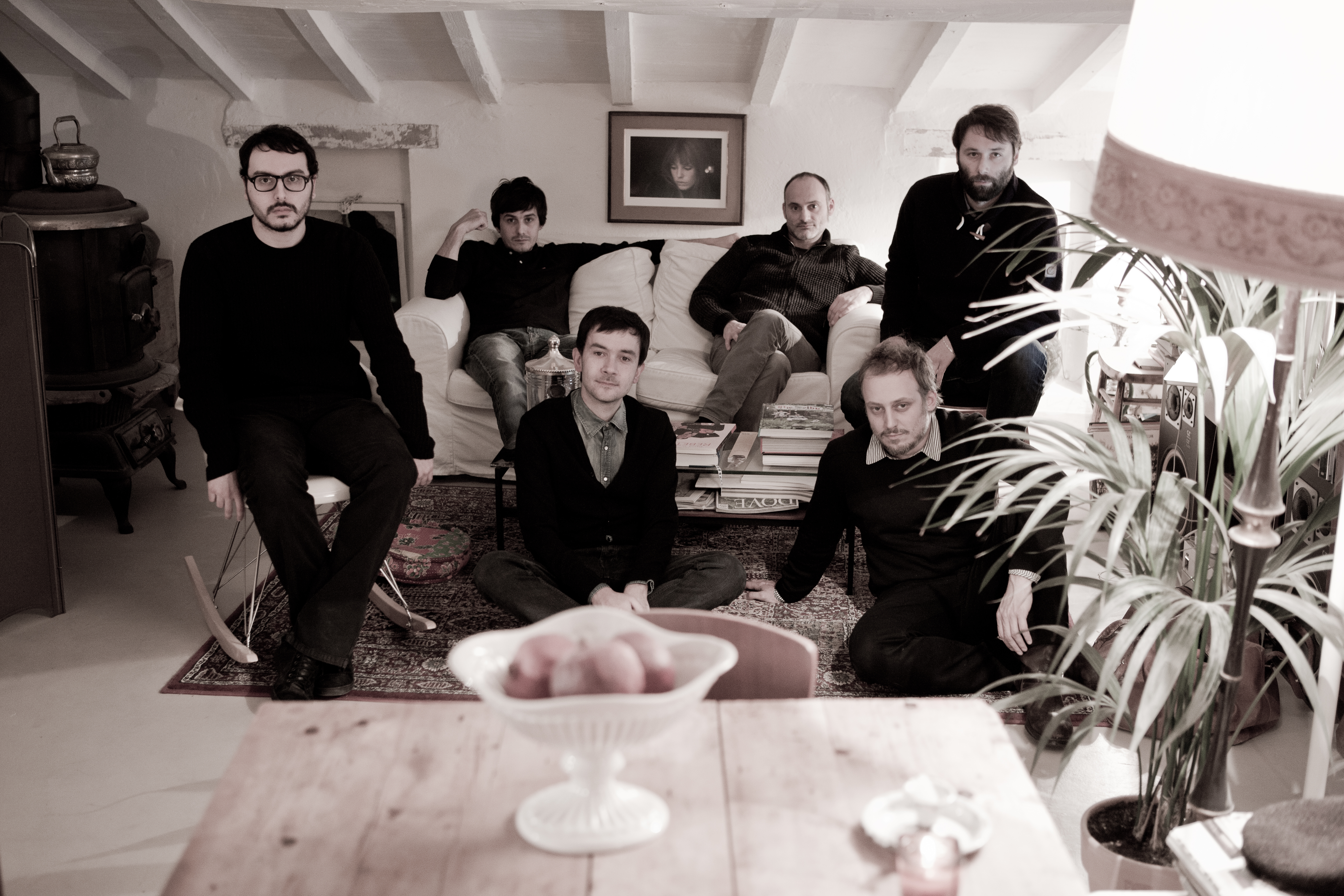
- Giardini di Mirò in 2011

Background information
- Origin: Cavriago, Italy
- Genres: Post-rock; psychedelia; shoegaze; dream pop; noise; post punk
- Years active: 1995–2024
- Labels: Santeria; 42 Records; 2nd rec
- Past members: Jukka Reverberi; Corrado Nuccini; Luca Di Mira; Andrea Scarfone; Emanuele Reverberi; Lorenzo Cattalani; Giuseppe Camuncoli; Alessandro Raina; Lorenzo Lanzi; Francesco Donadello; Andrea Mancin; Andrea Sologni; Mirko Venturelli
- Website: giardinidimiro.it

Giardini di Mirò was an Italian rock band from Cavriago who played a mix of post-rock, psychedelia, shoegaze, dream pop, noise, and post punk.

== History ==
Giardini di Mirò, which stemmed from a collaboration between Corrado Nuccini and his university friend Giuseppe Camuncoli, was formed in 1995. Over the following years, they were joined by Luca Di Mira, Jukka Reverberi, Mirko Venturelli, and Lorenzo Lanzi. Camuncoli, who sang and went on to become a comic book artist, left the band in 1998. Giardini di Mirò pivoted to instrumental music and released two EPs, in 1998 and 1999. Between 2001 and 2021, they published seven studio albums and a number of EPs, before disbanding in November 2024.

== Band members ==
Final lineup

- Jukka Reverberi – vocals, guitar, bass, live electronics (1996–2024)
- Corrado Nuccini – vocals, guitar (1995–2024)
- Luca Di Mira – keyboards (1995–2024)
- Andrea Scarfone – bass (2020–2024)
- Emanuele Reverberi – violin, trumpet, live electronics (2002–2024)
- Lorenzo Cattalani – drums (2013–2024)

Past

- Giuseppe Camuncoli - vocals (1995–1998)
- Alessandro Raina – vocals (2003)
- Lorenzo Lanzi – drums, percussion (1998–2003)
- Francesco Donadello – drums, live electronics, programming (2003–2011)
- Andrea Mancin – drums (2011–2013)
- Andrea Sologni – bass
- Mirko Venturelli – bass, clarinet, saxophone (1997–2020)

== Discography ==
=== Studio albums ===
- Rise and Fall of Academic Drifting (2001)
- Punk... Not Diet! (2003)
- Dividing Opinions (2007)
- Il fuoco (2009)
- Good Luck (2012)
- Rapsodia Satanica (2014)
- Different Times (2018)

=== Live albums ===
- Quasi casa (2026)

=== Compilations ===
- The Academic Rise of Falling Drifters (2002)
- Hits for Broken Hearts and Asses (2004)

=== EPs ===
- Giardini di Mirò (1998)
- Iceberg (1999)
- The Soft Touch (2002)
- Split with Deep End (2002)
- North Atlantic Treaty of Love, Pt. One (2005)
- North Atlantic Treaty of Love, Pt. Two (2006)
- Del tutto Illusorio (2021)

=== Soundtracks ===
- Sangue – La morte non esiste (2006)
