= Riccione (Thegiornalisti song) =

Single by Thegiornalisti
- Released: June 21, 2017
- Genre: Indie pop
- Length: 3:16
- Label: Carosello
- Songwriters: Tommaso Paradiso; Dario Faini; Alessandro Raina
- Producers: Dardust; Matteo Cantaluppi

Thegiornalisti singles chronology
"Non caderci mai più" (2017)	"Riccione" (2017)	"Happy Christmas John" (2017)

Music video
- "Riccione" on YouTube

"Riccione" is a song by Italian indie pop band Thegiornalisti. It was released on 21 June 2017 through Carosello Records.

The song became the first and only Thegiornalisti's song to peak at number one on the Italian singles chart, being certified fourth platinum by FIMI. The song also inspired the 2020 Netflix romantic comedy Under the Riccione Sun, with "Riccione" as the main theme and lead singer Tommaso Paradiso in a cameo role.

== Composition ==
The song was written by the frontman of the band Tommaso Paradiso with Alessandro Raina and Dardust, who also produced the track with Matteo Cantaluppi.

== Music video ==
The music video for the song, directed by YouNuts! was released on July 21, 2017, through the singer's YouTube channel. The video was filmed in Romagna's cities of Riccione, Rimini and Cattolica, with references to 1980s and 1990s inspired by cult films and TV series such as Time for Loving and Baywatch.

== Charts ==
=== Weekly charts ===
Chart (2017)	Peak position
Italy (FIMI)	1
Italy Airplay (EarOne)	1
Switzerland (Schweizer Hitparade)	59

=== Year-end charts ===
Chart (2017)	Position
Italy (FIMI)	23

== Certifications ==
Certifications for "Riccione"
Region	Certification	Certified units/sales
Italy (FIMI)	4× Platinum	200,000^{‡}
^{‡} Sales+streaming figures based on certification alone.
