= Vulcano (song) =

Single by Francesca Michielin

from the album 2640
- Released: 21 July 2017
- Recorded: 2016
- Genre: Pop
- Length: 3:09
- Label: Sony Music Entertainment
- Songwriter(s): Francesca Michielin; Dario Faini

Francesca Michielin singles chronology
"Almeno tu" (2016)	"Vulcano" (2017)	"Io non abito al mare" (2017)

"Vulcano" is a song performed by Italian singer Francesca Michielin. The three-minute song was released as a digital download on 21 July 2017 by Sony Music Entertainment. The song has peaked at number 44 on the Italian Singles Chart.

== Background ==
In an interview with ANSA, she said, "Vulcano is an emblematic title that already makes sense in that there is something explosive in me and in my new way of making music, a volcano is something immediate, dirty and visceral, which at one point explodes."

== Critical reception ==
William Lee Adams from Wiwibloggs described Vulcano as "play[ing] in the space between urban pop and tropical house, throbbing and pulsating with a heady mix of drum, piano, horns and more", concluding that "amid all the heat there’s a strong sense of cool, creating what may be her finest single yet."

== Music video ==
An official music video to accompany the release of "Vulcano" was first released onto YouTube on 21 July 2017 at a total length of three minutes and seventeen seconds. It was directed by Giacomo Triglia and filmed in Berlin between 22:00 and 5:30. In the video, Michielin travels through the city and visits various locations including the subway, a photo booth and a nightclub.

== Track listing ==
Digital download
No.	Title	Length
1.	"Vulcano" (radio edit)	3:09

== Charts ==
Chart (2017)	Peak position
Italy (FIMI)	44
Italy Airplay (EarOne)	1
Slovakia (Rádio Top 100)	59

== Certifications ==
Region	Certification	Certified units/sales
Italy (FIMI)	Platinum	50,000^{‡}
^{‡} Sales+streaming figures based on certification alone.

== Release history ==
Region	Date	Format	Label
Italy	21 July 2017	Digital download	Sony Music Entertainment
