= Nei tuoi occhi =

Single by Francesca Michielin
- Released: 8 October 2021
- Genre: Pop
- Length: 3:03
- Label: Sony Music Italy
- Songwriter: Francesca Michielin
- Composer: Andrea Farri
- Producers: Enrico Brun; Francesca Michielin

Francesca Michielin singles chronology
"Cinema" (2021)	"Nei tuoi occhi" (2021)	"Bonsoir" (2022)

Music video
- "Nei tuoi occhi" on YouTube

"Nei tuoi occhi" is a song recorded by Italian singer-songwriter Francesca Michielin. It was released on 8 October 2021 through Sony Music Italy, as the lead single from the soundtrack of the 2021 Italian romantic comedy-drama film Marilyn's Eyes.

The song was nominated for Best Original Song at both the David di Donatello and at the Nastro d'Argento.

== Composition ==
The song, written, composed and produced by Michelin herself, with Italian composer Andrea Farri and Enrico Brun, is included in the soundtrack of the film Marilyn's Eyes, directed by Simone Godano. Michielin explained the meaning of the song:

"A pop song with an immersive sound, designed to create a world of emotions transcending the pure sounds of the composition. "Nei tuoi occhi" develops from the musical theme that recurs constantly in every sequence: a delicate piano riff from which a variation on the theme with minimal electronic sounds comes to life."

== Music video ==
The music video, directed by Giacomo Triglia, premiered on October 12, 2021 on La Repubblica's website and was then uploaded the following day on the singer's YouTube channel.

== Charts ==
Chart performance for "Nei tuoi occhi"
Chart (2021)	Peak position
San Marino (SMRRTV Top 50)	43

== Accolades ==
Award nominations for "Nei tuoi occhi"
Year	Ceremony	Award	Result	Ref.
2022	David di Donatello	Best Original Song	Nominated	
2022	Nastro d'Argento	Best Original Song	Nominated	
2022	Ciak Awards	Best Original Song	Nominated	
