= Rumore =

Surname

Rumore Coat of Arms

The surname Rumore may be of nickname origin, being derived from a personal attribute or physical characteristic of the first bearer. In this case, the surname is derived from the Italian word "Rumore" which means noise, din, clamour, outcry and uproar. Thus, the surname Rumore would signify that the original bearer was of a "noisy" or "boisterous" nature.

Alternatively, the surname may be a variant of the ancient French surname "Romere" which was originally applied to one who had made a pilgrimage to Rome. In fact one Cristiana La Romere was living in Suffolk England in 1273 (Hundred Rolls).

Finally, the surname Rumore may be of toponymic origin, being derived from the name of the place of origin of the initial bearer. In this instance, the surname may be derived from the place name Rumour which is located in Normandy, France. Thus, the name Rumore may signify one who came from "Rumour."

== Coat of Arms ==
Blazon of Arms: Argent; a fess gules; Between in chief two mullets or; and in base a rose, petals or and gules.

Translation: "Argent" is a color, usually silver or white. It represents peace and sincerity. "A fess gules" is the red bar across the middle of the shield. "Gules" is the color red, and represents a warrior or martyr, and military strength and magnanimity. "Between in chief two mullets": the word "chief" means the top one-third of the shield; signifies dominion and authority; often granted as a special reward for prudence and wisdom or successful command in war. A "mullet" is a divine quality from above; mark of the third son. "In base of rose, petals or and gules": A rose represents the mark of the seventh son; hope and joy. "Gules" is the color red, and in the case of the rose means grace and beauty.

Crest: The rose of the arms

Origin: Italy

== Demographics ==
World Wide Distribution of the Surname Rumore

People bearing surname Rumore can be mainly found in Italy and the United States, and in much lower frequencies in Australia, Canada, Germany, England, France, Argentina, Puerto Rico and Morocco. The estimated worldwide population of surname Rumore is approximately 1,228. The frequency of "Rumore's" per one million of the population can be found in the following countries, regions, and cities. Australia excluded from region and city statistics due to lack of data. F.P.M. excluded for city statistics due to lack of data.

Country	F.P.M.	Region	F.P.M.	City	F.P.M.
Italy	5.34	Sicily, Italy	42.79	Palermo, Italy	N/D
United States	2.30	Umbria, Italy	19.98	Bisaquino, Italy	N/D
Australia	1.01	New Hampshire, U.S.	19.97	Rockford, Illinois, U.S.	N/D
Canada	0.69	Louisiana, U.S.	11.18	Freiburg, Germany	N/D
Germany	0.23	Manitoba, Canada	8.78	Roma, Italy	N/D
England	0.09	Abruzzo, Italy	8.45	Prizzi, Italy	N/D
France	0.05	Piemonte, Italy	6.7	Mannheim, Germany	N/D
N/D	N/D	New Jersey, U.S.	6.48	Aylesbury, U.K.	N/D
N/D	N/D	Wyoming, U.S.	6.09	Orvieto, Italy	N/D
N/D	N/D	Nevada, U.S.	5.99	S. Giuseppe Jato, Italy	N/D

=== United States ===
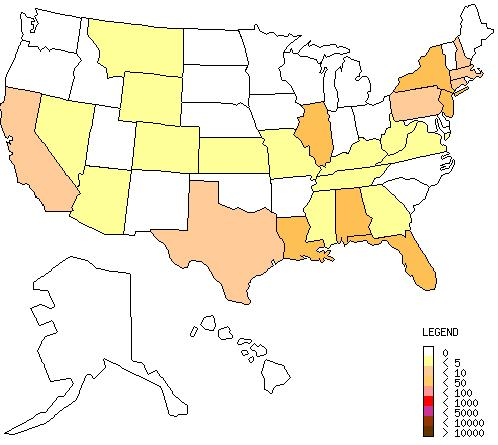
U.S. Distribution of the Surname Rumore, year 2000

According to the 2000 U.S. census, the surname Rumore ranks as the 34,459th most common name in the country. The surname had 622 occurrences in the 2000 Census, and out of a sample of 100,000 people in the United States, Rumore would occur an average of 0.23 times.

96.3 percent, or 599 total occurrences, were "Non-Hispanic White Only" and 3.38 percent, or 21 total occurrences, were "Hispanic Origin." An insignificant percent, or Less than 100 total occurrences, were "Non-Hispanic Asian, Pacific Islander, Non-Hispanic American Indian and Alaskan Native."

Most of the Rumore population are clustered in the North East, and South East of the U.S. The highest frequency per million can be found in the state of New Hampshire and in the city of Rockford, Illinois. Based on the 2000 census figures, the current population is estimated at 705.

=== Italy & Sicily ===
Italian Distribution of the Surname Rumore

Most of the Rumore population are clustered in the South of Italy, mainly Sicily. The estimated population of the people bearing the surname Rumore in Italy is approximately 321. The surname only occurs in about 50 towns throughout Italy, and 17 out of 390 Sicilian towns.
