= Mille (song) =

Single by Fedez, Achille Lauro and Orietta Berti

from the album Disumano
- Released: 11 June 2021
- Genre: Pop; twist
- Length: 2:55
- Label: Warner; Sony
- Songwriters: Federico Lucia; Lauro De Marinis; Paolo Antonacci; Jacopo D'Amico; Davide Simonetta
- Producer: Davide Simonetta

Fedez singles chronology
"Chiamami per nome" (2021)	"Mille" (2021)	"Meglio del cinema" (2021)

Achille Lauro singles chronology
"Marilù" (2021)	"Mille" (2021)	"Latte+" (2021)

Orietta Berti singles chronology
"Lupin" (2021)	"Mille" (2021)	"Luna piena" (2021)

"Mille" is a song by Italian singers Fedez, Achille Lauro and Orietta Berti. It was released by Warner Music Italy and Sony Music on 11 June 2021 as the fourth single from Fedez's sixth studio album Disumano.

It was written by Fedez, Achille Lauro, Davide Simonetta, Paolo Antonacci, and Dargen D'Amico, and produced by Simonetta. "Mille" peaked at number one on the Italian FIMI Singles Chart and was certified platinum in Italy two weeks after its release.

== Background ==
The song was born following a collaboration decided by the three artists during the Sanremo Music Festival 2021 and was announced by the three artists through an Instagram live on the evening of 12 June 2021. Fedez revealed in an interview that he had originally planned for Annalisa to sing in the chorus, but she wasn't able to take part, and the song was passed to Berti. The cover of the single, created by Francesco Vezzoli, shows the three artists in the form of nymphs covered with flowers, created from the painting Le tre Grazie by Émile Vernon. The song has an official choreography, which was published by Fedez on his Instagram profile.

== Commercial performance ==
"Mille" debuted at number one on the FIMI Singles Chart, becoming Fedez's tenth number one, Lauro's first and Berti's first since 1965.

== Music video ==
The music video for the song was released on Fedez's YouTube channel on 14 June 2021. It was directed by Giulio Rosati. The video was accused of covertly advertising for the brand Coca-Cola by the agency Codacons, with bottles of the drink appearing several times throughout the video, in reference to the lyrics of the song.

== Track listing ==
Digital download
No.	Title	Length
1.	"Mille"	2:55

== Charts ==
=== Weekly charts ===
Weekly chart performance for "Mille"
Chart (2021)	Peak position
Italy (FIMI)	1
Switzerland (Schweizer Hitparade)	43

=== Year-end charts ===
2021 year-end chart performance for "Mille"
Chart (2021)	Position
Italy (FIMI)	3

== Certifications ==
Region	Certification	Certified units/sales
Italy (FIMI)	6× Platinum	420,000^{‡}
^{‡} Sales+streaming figures based on certification alone.
