= Gange =

Italian pop song by Francesca Michielin

Single by Francesca Michielin featuring Shiva

from the album Feat (stato di natura)
- Released: 21 February 2020
- Genre: Indie pop
- Length: 3:03
- Label: RCA Records
- Songwriters: Andrea Arrigoni; Davide Maddalena; Francesca Michielin
- Producer: Adam11

Francesca Michielin singles chronology
"Cheyenne" (2019)	"Gange" (2020)	"Riserva naturale" (2020)

Shiva singles chronology
"Calmo" (2020)	"Gange" (2020)	"Auto blu" (2020)

"Gange" (Italian for Ganges) is a song performed by Italian singer Francesca Michielin and featuring Italian rapper Shiva. The song was released on 21 February 2020 by RCA Records as the second single from her fourth studio album Feat (stato di natura), and co-written and produced by Adam11.

The song peaked at number 61 on the Italian Singles Chart.

== Personnel ==
Credits adapted from Tidal.

- Davide Maddalena – producer, author
- Francesca Michielin – associated performer, author, vocals
- Shiva – featured artist, author, vocals

== Track listing ==
Digital download
No.	Title	Producer	Length
1.	"Gange" (featuring Shiva)	Adam11	3:03

== Charts ==
Chart (2020)	Peak position
Italy (FIMI)	61
