= Cinema (Samuel and Francesca Michielin song) =

Single by Samuel and Francesca Michielin

from the album Brigata bianca
- Released: 14 May 2021
- Genre: Dance-pop
- Length: 2:49
- Label: Epic
- Songwriters: Federico Nardelli; Lorenzo Urciullo; Samuel Umberto Romano
- Producer: Federico Nardelli

Samuel singles chronology
"Cocoricò" (2021)	"Cinema" (2021)	"Quella sera" (2021)

Francesca Michielin singles chronology
"Chiamami per nome" (2021)	"Cinema" (2021)	"Nei tuoi occhi" (2021)

"Cinema" is a song written by Federico Nardelli, Lorenzo Urciullo and Samuel Umberto Romano and recorded by Italian singers Samuel and Francesca Michielin. Produced by Nardelli, the song was released as a single on 14 May 2021. With lyrics describing a desire to return to carefree days, the song was chosen by Italian radio station RTL 102.5 as a candidate song of the summer at the RTL 102.5 Power Hits Estate 2021. It peaked at number 93 on the FIMI Italian Singles Chart.

== Background ==
The song was written by Samuel, Lorenzo Urciullo and Federico Nardelli. Since the beginning, it was conceived as a duet. Samuel and Michielin met for the first time during an episode of Italian talent show X Factor in 2019, when Samuel was a judge and Michielin appeared as a musical guest. Despite this, the idea to involve Michielin in the project came from Urciullo, who previously collaborated with her. Michielin was asked to perform the song through her manager, Marta Donà, and was enthusiastic about it. The song's lyrics were slightly changed in order to better represent Michilien.

Its lyrics focus on the will to come back to cheerful and carefree days, after months during which people had to deal with restrictions related to the COVID-19 pandemic, and spent a lot of time at home watching films alone. According to Samuel, "Beyond the bad parts of these times, we had the opportunity to re-discover ourselves through several film stages, and I liked the idea to talk about it through a song that talks about starting again, about getting back on the road of ordinary days". The song's lyrics include several film references, citing directors Tinto Brass and François Truffaut, as well as films Jules and Jim and Jackie Brown.

== Music video ==
The music video for the song was directed by Giacomo Triglia. Filmed in Venice, it shows Samuel and Michielin in the Venetian Lagoon, while a monster is following them. After they appear on the red carpet of the Venice Film Festival, they discover nobody is waiting for them. In the end, they start dancing together with the lagoon monster. The video premiered at Italian cinemas on 28 May 2021, and was broadcast before every film for 48 hours, until 30 May 2021.

== Charts ==
Chart (2021)	Peak position
Italy (FIMI)	93
San Marino (SMRRTV Top 50)	9

== Certifications ==
Region	Certification	Certified units/sales
Italy (FIMI)	Gold	35,000^{‡}
^{‡} Sales+streaming figures based on certification alone.
