= 2640 (album) =

Studio album by Francesca Michielin
- Released: 12 January 2018
- Recorded: 2017, Los Angeles
- Genre: Pop; indie pop
- Length: 44:47
- Label: Sony Music Italy
- Producer: Michele Canova

Francesca Michielin chronology
| Nice to Meet You (Acoustic Live Solo) (2016) | 2640 (2018) | Feat (stato di natura) (2020) |

Singles from 2640
- 1. "Vulcano" Released: 21 July 2017; 2. "Io non abito al mare" Released: 17 November 2017; 3. "Bolivia" Released: 16 March 2018; 4. "Tropicale" Released: 15 June 2018; 5. "FEMME" Released: 16 November 2018

2640 is the third studio album by Italian singer-songwriter Francesca Michielin, released by Sony Music Italy on 12 January 2018. It was released on vinyl on 7 December 2018 with the original 13 tracks as well as "Femme", a demo version of "Tropicale" and "Fotografia" with Carl Brave and Fabri Fibra.

== Background ==
Michielin announced she started working in studio on her third album in January 2017, through her Twitter account. The album's tracks were recorded in Los Angeles with Italian producer Michele Canova.

A few days after the album's release, Michielin and Treedom announced a plan to plant one tree in Kenya for every 200,000 streams that the album received.

== Release and promotion ==
On 21 July 2017, she released the single "Vulcano". The music video was released on the same day. It was directed by Giacomo Triglia and filmed between 10pm and 5:30am in Berlin. The song spent 16 weeks on the Italian singles chart, peaking at number 44, and was certified Platinum for sales exceeding 50,000 copies.

On 1 October 2017, Michielin performed "Vulcano" as a musical guest on Rai 1's TV show Che tempo che fa and announced that the album would be released on 12 January 2018.

"Io non abito al mare" was released as the album's second single on 17 November 2017. The music video was directed by Giacomo Triglia and was released on 20 November 2017. It was filmed at Cretto di Burri. The song spent 18 weeks on the Italian singles chart, peaking at number 15, and was certified Platinum for sales exceeding 50,000 copies.

On 4 December 2017, the album's cover and title were announced. The track listing was announced on 20 December 2017 through Michielin's social network accounts. On 22 December 2017, the album was made available for pre-order, and the track "Tropicale" was released as a pre-order bonus and on streaming platforms.

On 16 March 2018, Michielin announced that "Bolivia" would be released as the album's third single. The music video was released on 20 March 2018. It was directed by Giacomo Triglia and the screenplay was written by Francesca Michielin. In an interview with Rolling Stone, Michielin said that the song is a criticism of people who chase change and run away to exotic and remote places with the idea of living a more genuine life and making a difference, without realising that often the problem to be solved is within them.

"Tropicale" was released as the fourth single on 15 June 2018, along with a music video.

On 16 November 2018, Michielin released the single "Femme". The song has a feminist message, describing the negative situations that women accept unconsciously. It was remixed by Bruno Belissimo. The single preceded the release of 2640 on vinyl on 7 December 2018. The vinyl edition also included a demo version of "Tropicale" and Carl Brave's single "Fotografia", on which Michielin and Fabri Fibra featured. "Fotografia" had considerable success in Italy, peaking at number 6 and achieving a certification of 3× Platinum for sales exceeding 150,000 copies.

== Track listing ==
Standard edition
| No. | Title | Writer(s) | Length |
|---|---|---|---|
| 1. | "Comunicare" | Francesca Michielin | 4:21 |
| 2. | "Bolivia" | Michielin | 3:36 |
| 3. | "Noleggiami ancora un film" | Michielin; Dario Faini | 3:44 |
| 4. | "Io non abito al mare" | Michielin; Calcutta | 3:13 |
| 5. | "Tropicale" | Calcutta; Faini | 3:26 |
| 6. | "E se c'era..." | Tommaso Paradiso; Faini | 3:16 |
| 7. | "Scusa se non ho gli occhi azzurri" | Michielin | 3:46 |
| 8. | "Vulcano" | Michielin; Faini | 3:14 |
| 9. | "Due galassie" | Michielin | 2:57 |
| 10. | "La Serie B" | Michielin; Calcutta | 3:32 |
| 11. | "Tapioca" | Michielin; Cosmo; Calcutta | 3:43 |
| 12. | "Lava" | Michielin; Faini | 3:02 |
| 13. | "Alonso" | Michielin | 2:57 |
| Total length: | | | 44:47 |

Vinyl edition
| No. | Title | Writer(s) | Length |
|---|---|---|---|
| 1. | "Comunicare" | Francesca Michielin | 4:21 |
| 2. | "Bolivia" | Michielin | 3:36 |
| 3. | "Noleggiami ancora un film" | Michielin; Dario Faini | 3:44 |
| 4. | "Io non abito al mare" | Michielin; Calcutta | 3:13 |
| 5. | "Tropicale" | Calcutta; Faini | 3:26 |
| 6. | "Femme" | Michielin; Calcutta | 3:24 |
| 7. | "E se c'era..." | Tommaso Paradiso; Faini | 3:16 |
| 8. | "Scusa se non ho gli occhi azzurri" | Michielin | 3:46 |
| 9. | "Vulcano" | Michielin; Faini | 3:14 |
| 10. | "Due galassie" | Michielin | 2:57 |
| 11. | "Fotografia" (Carl Brave featuring Francesca Michielin and Fabri Fibra) | Michielin; Carlo Luigi Coraggio; Fabrizio Tarducci | 3:41 |
| 12. | "La Serie B" | Michielin; Calcutta | 3:32 |
| 13. | "Tapioca" | Michielin; Cosmo; Calcutta | 3:43 |
| 14. | "Lava" | Michielin; Faini | 3:02 |
| 15. | "Alonso" | Michielin | 2:57 |
| 16. | "Tropicale (Demo)" | Calcutta; Faini |

== Personnel ==
Credits adapted from AllMusicItalia.it.

Production

- Michele "Canova" Iorfida – producer, pre-producer, arranger
- Pat "MyBestFault" Simonini – pre-producer, arranger
- Christian Rigano – pre-producer
- Cosmo – arranger (track 11)
- Mattia Barro "Splendore" – arranger (track 1)
- Francesca Michielin – vocal producer

Music

- Alex Alessandroni JR – keyboards, synthesizers
- Francesca Michielin – lead vocals, piano, keyboards, synthesizers
- Pat "MyBestFault" Simonini – programming, rhythmic programming
- Michele "Canova" Iorfida – keyboards, synthesizers, rhythmic programming
- Tim Pierce – acoustic guitars, electric guitars
- Esther Oduro – sampled vocals (track 11)

== Charts ==
=== Weekly chart ===
| Chart (2018) | Peak position |
|---|---|
| Italian Albums (FIMI) | 2 |
| Swiss Albums (Schweizer Hitparade) | 64 |

=== Year-end charts ===
| Chart (2018) | Position |
|---|---|
| Italian Albums (FIMI) | 62 |

== Certifications ==
| Region | Certification | Certified units/sales |
|---|---|---|
| Italy (FIMI) | Gold | 25,000^{‡} |
^{‡} Sales+streaming figures based on certification alone.
