= Io non abito al mare =

Single by Francesca Michielin

from the album 2640
- Released: 17 November 2017
- Recorded: 2017
- Genre: Pop
- Length: 3:13
- Label: Sony Music Entertainment
- Songwriters: Francesca Michielin; Edoardo D'Erme

Francesca Michielin singles chronology
"Vulcano" (2017)	"Io non abito al mare" (2017)	"Bolivia" (2018)

"Io non abito al mare" is a song performed by Italian singer Francesca Michielin. The song was released as a digital download on 17 November 2017 by Sony Music Entertainment. The song has peaked at number 15 on the Italian Singles Chart.

== Background ==
In an interview with Sky Magazine Italy, she explained that the song "is about the difficulty of communicating or, more specifically, the difference between hearing and listening, and the obstacles between the words that we want to say".

== Critical reception ==
Natalie Feliks from Wiwibloggs said, "The X Factor Italia winner proves once again that she’s a master of understatement: She never lets the music overtake her. She wraps her arms around it and exudes passion that draws you in. Power, she demonstrates, has many shades — including the supple and nuanced. As we’ve come to expect from the Italian songstress, the lyrics are gorgeous."

== Music video ==
An official music video to accompany the release of "Io non abito al mare" was first released onto YouTube on 20 November 2017 at a total length of three minutes and fourteen seconds. It was directed by Giacomo Triglia and filmed at Cretto di Burri in Sicily.

== Track listing ==
Digital download
No.	Title	Length
1.	"Io non abito al mare"	3:14

== Charts ==
Chart (2017–18)	Peak position
Italy (FIMI)	15

== Certifications ==
Region	Certification	Certified units/sales
Italy (FIMI)	Platinum	50,000^{‡}
^{‡} Sales+streaming figures based on certification alone.

== Release history ==
Region	Date	Format	Label
Italy	17 November 2017	Digital download	Sony Music Entertainment
