= Treedom =

Planting of trees worldwide

- Founded: 2010; 16 years ago in Florence, Italy
- Founder: Tommaso Speroni and Federico Garcea
- Founded at: Florence, Italy
- Type: Environmental technology company
- Region served: Africa, South America, Southeast Asia and Italy
- Services: Tree Plantation
- Website: www.treedom.net

Treedom is a platform that allows anyone to plant trees in different countries of the world. Treedom also allows the 'owner's of the planted trees to receive images of the trees that have just been planted along with its GPS coordinates and updates from the project it is part of.

== Procedure ==
The project developer who applies to become a "tree planter" has to make a formal request in the form of the "project". The submission is reviewed to exclude projects that require cutting other trees to make the space, violate the law, consider planting invasive species and the like. The farmer confirms the fact of planting the tree with the help of the specialized mobile application that captures both photo and GPS coordinates. These reports are then manually checked, verifying the location, quality of the image and species of the planted tree. Trees that do not take root for the first three years must be replanted. Treedom claims inspecting in place at least 25% of these projects per year. Additionally, 5% of the planted trees are put aside as so called “Project Reserve” that should cover possible loss of trees and the related CO_{2} absorption (like trees that die after the third year, for which a substitution is not provided). A user can then order planting a selected tree online, paying as for a web purchase.

== Tree planters ==
Treedom works in collaboration with small collective of farmers, local community and NGO across different countries including Kenya, Tanzania, Guatemala, Ecuador, Italy, Haiti, Nepal, Pakistan, Peru, Italy, etc.

For the trees which bear fruits, the fruits are reckoned to belong to the farmers who planted it. The farmer planting a tree remains responsible for its growth and takes care where the organization provides support by arranging agroforestry training and income opportunities. The platform is known to promote welfare of farmers, including female farmers for which it announced 'Mothers day campaign' during March 2020 with the aim to spread awareness about the difficulties faced by female agricultural workers.

== User interface ==
When a person chooses to own a certain tree, the sapling is planted by the local farmer on behalf of the person. The updates of the sapling are provided using GPS location and photographs on regular basis via webpage dedicated to this plant. Apart from this, the platform also allows a tree to be gifted. It is also possible to view the local weather data in the vicinity of the tree.

== History ==
Treedom was founded in the year 2010 by Tommaso Speroni and Federico Garcea in Florence, Italy. The objective of the organization was described as The Sustainable Development Goals, which includes counter-deforestation, protecting biodiversity, preventing soil erosion, combating CO_{2} emission on one side and sustainable food production and income security for farmers on the other side. As in April 2021, Treedom has been reported to collaborate with 75000 farmers and plant more than 2 million trees across Asia, Africa and Central and South America.

== Notes ==
- Green computing e e-commerce sostenibile. Un piccolo viaggio negli impatti ambientali della rete, ISBN 978-1-326-90102-8
- Den Herzschlag der Natur spüren Achtsam und verbunden leben, ISBN 978-1-326-90102-8
- Energy Policy and Climate Change, ISBN 978-3-030-43578-3, doi:10.1007/978-3-030-43578-3_10
- Subramanian Senthilkannan Muthu, Miguel Angel Gardetti, Sustainability in the Textile and Apparel Industries: Consumerism and Fashion Sustainability. ISBN 978-3-030-38532-3
- Zaigham Mahmood, Developing and Monitoring Smart Environments for Intelligent Cities, ISBN 978-1-7998-5063-2
