= Chiamami per nome =

Single by Francesca Michielin and Fedez

from the album Feat (Fuori dagli spazi)
- Released: 3 March 2021
- Genre: Pop
- Length: 3:43
- Label: RCA
- Songwriters: Francesca Michielin; Federico Lucia; Jacopo D'Amico; Alessandro Raina; Alessandro Mahmoud; Davide Simonetta
- Producer: d.whale

Francesca Michielin singles chronology
"Cattive stelle" (2021)	"Chiamami per nome" (2021)	"Cinema" (2021)

Fedez singles chronology
"Bella storia" (2020)	"Chiamami per nome" (2021)	"Mille" (2021)

"Chiamami per nome" ("Call me by my name") is a song co-written and recorded by Italian singer Francesca Michielin and Italian rapper Fedez. It was released by RCA Records on 3 March 2021 as the second single from the reissue of Michielin's fourth studio album Feat (stato di natura).

The song was written by the two artists with co-writing contribution by Dargen D'Amico, Alessandro Raina and Mahmood and produced by Davide Simonetta. It competed during the 71st Sanremo Music Festival, placing second at the final rank. On 5 March 2021, two days after the song was released, "Chiamami per nome" debuted at number 2 on the Italian FIMI Singles Chart, before reaching the top of the chart the following week.

== Background ==
Francesca Michielin and Fedez previously recorded two songs together, "Cigno nero" in 2013 and "Magnifico" in 2014, achieving commercial success and collecting a total of eight platinum records in Italy. In spring 2020, during the COVID-19 lockdown in Italy, Fedez invited Michielin to join him during an Instagram Direct for a live performance. Following the performance, they developed the idea to collaborate for a third time. The song was originally written by Michielin and Fedez, and later reworked by Mahmood, Dargen D'Amico, Davide Simonetta and Alessandro Raina. "Chiamami per nome" is also the second collaboration between Michielin and Mahmood after "Cheyenne". Michielin described "Chiamami per nome" as "a lovesong imbued with hope, dreams and anger". Fedez also considered it as a departure from their previous works together, with a less-classic structure, "a stylistic upgrade, a pop song with urban shades". Unlike "Magnifico" and "Cigno nero", "Chiamami per nome" also features singing contributions by Fedez, who only rapped in the previous songs with Michielin.

Michielin explained the title refers to "the moments in which, during difficult times, people only want to be called by their own name".

== Music video ==
The music video for the song was released on YouTube on 3 March 2021. Based on an idea by Michielin and Fedez, the video shows them performing the song in different theatres in Milan, such as the Teatro degli Arcimboldi, the Teatro Menotti, the Teatro Gerolamo and the Teatro alla Scala. Show business workers also appear on the video, while setting the stage for a concert without any audience except for themselves. The video aims at highlighting the crisis of the live-music business generated by the COVID-19 pandemic in Italy. The video was directed by Antonio Usbergo and Nicolò Celaia.

== Charts ==
Chart performance for "Chiamami per nome"
Chart (2021)	Peak position
Global Excl. U.S. (Billboard)	100
Italy (FIMI)	1
San Marino (SMRRTV Top 50)	7
Switzerland (Schweizer Hitparade)	19

=== Year-end charts ===
Chart (2021)	Position
Italy (FIMI)	26

== Certifications ==
Region	Certification	Certified units/sales
Italy (FIMI)	3× Platinum	210,000^{‡}
^{‡} Sales+streaming figures based on certification alone.
