= Stato di natura =

Single by Francesca Michielin & Måneskin

from the album Feat (stato di natura)
- Released: 13 March 2020
- Genre: Rap rock
- Length: 2:05
- Label: RCA Records
- Songwriters: Francesca Michielin; Måneskin

Francesca Michielin singles chronology
"Monolocale" (2020)	"Stato di natura" (2020)	"Cattive stelle" (2021)

Måneskin singles chronology
"Le parole lontane" (2019)	"Stato di natura" (2020)	"Vent'anni" (2020)

"Stato di natura" is a song written and performed by Italian singer Francesca Michielin and Italian rock band Måneskin. The song was released as a digital download on 13 March 2020 by RCA Records as the fifth single from Michielin's fourth studio album Feat (stato di natura). The song has peaked at number 99 on the Italian Singles Chart.

In 2021 "Stato di natura" received a nomination for the Amnesty Award "Voices for Freedom", recognizing song recordings focusing on human rights and released by Italian artists.

== Music video ==
An official music video to accompany the release of "Stato di natura" was first released onto YouTube on 19 March 2020.

== Track listing ==
Digital download
No.	Title	Length
1.	"Stato di natura"	2:05

== Charts ==
Chart (2019)	Peak position
Italy (FIMI)	99

== Release history ==
Region	Date	Format	Label
Italy	13 March 2020	Digital download	RCA Records
