= Samuel Umberto Romano =

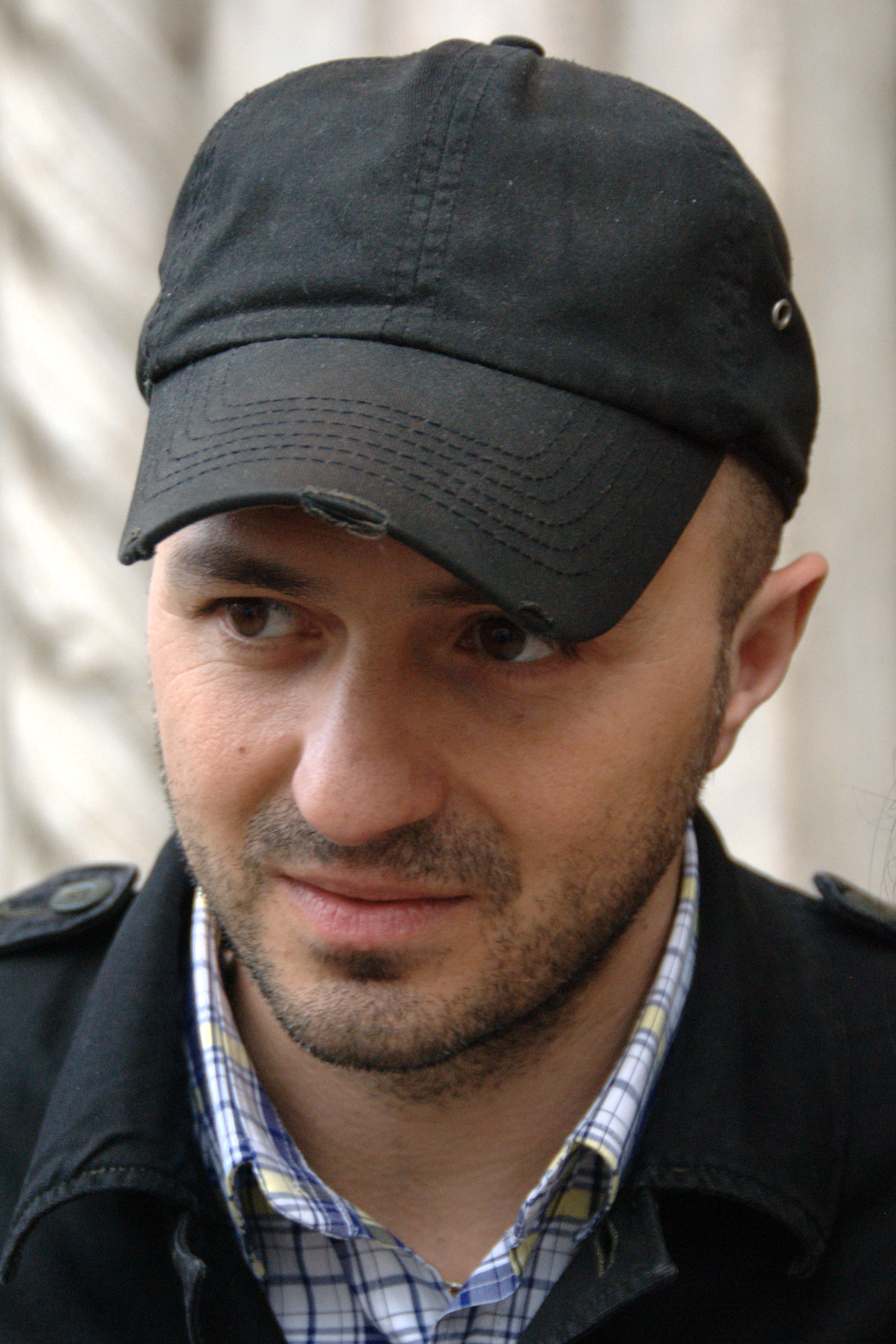

Background information
- Born: 7 March 1972 (age 54)
- Origin: Turin, Italy
- Genres: Pop rock; soft rock
- Occupations: Singer; songwriter; guitarist
- Instruments: Vocals, guitar
- Years active: 1996–present

Samuel Umberto Romano (born 7 March 1972) is an Italian singer and songwriter, better known as the frontman of Italian rock band Subsonica. He was also a founding member of the group Motel Connection, and in 2017 he launched his solo career, under the mononym Samuel. As a solo artist, he released the studio albums Il codice della bellezza in 2017 and Brigata bianca in 2021, both of which entered the top ten of the FIMI Italian Albums Chart. In 2017, he competed in 67th Sanremo Music Festival, placing tenth with the song "Vedrai". In 2019 he also was a judge on the 13th season of Italian talent show X Factor. In 2021 he released "Cinema" with Francesca Michielin, which peaked at number 93 on the FIMI Italian Singles Chart and was certified Gold by FIMI.
