= Cheyenne (Francesca Michielin song) =

Italian pop song by Francesca Michielin

Single by Francesca Michielin & Charlie Charles

from the album Feat (stato di natura)
- Released: 15 November 2019
- Length: 3:25
- Label: RCA Records
- Songwriters: Mahmood; Alessandro Raina; Charlie Charles

Francesca Michielin singles chronology
"Glorious" (2019)	"Cheyenne" (2019)	"Gange" (2020)

Charlie Charles singles chronology
"Calipso" (2019)	"Cheyenne" (2019)	"Obladi oblada" (2023)

Music video
- "Cheyenne" on YouTube

"Cheyenne" is a song performed by Italian singer Francesca Michielin and featuring Italian record producer and DJ Charlie Charles. The song was released as a digital download on 15 November 2019 by RCA Records as the lead single from her fourth studio album Feat (stato di natura). The song peaked at number 66 on the Italian Singles Chart and was certified gold in Italy. The song was written by Mahmood, Alessandro Raina and Charlie Charles.

== Background ==
The song was written by Italian singer-songwriter Mahmood, with Alessandro Raina, Davide Simonetta and Charlie Charles. According to Michielin, she and Mahmood knew each other from time before, they worked together on other songs that were never released, and he knew Michielin's world and the things she wanted to communicate. He then came in contact with her, claiming he had written a song specifically for her. "It's one of the few songs I performed with lyrics that were not written by me", Michielin commented, "but when I read Mahmood's words I understood they perfectly represented me and I could not refuse".

Reviewing the song for Il Giornale, Paolo Giordano described it as "a natural painting, occasionally wild, with ventured vocal exercises, and occasionally tribal, thanks to digital and sharp percussions", with a "very urban sound, which wraps a nostalgic composition with strong chiaroscuro". The song's lyrics describe the illusion of having lived an important love story, a unique moment which disappeared without a clear reason. Of Charles' production, Michielin said "he knew how to produce for the nature of the song: without superstructures, getting straight to the heart like an arrow".

== Music video ==
An official music video to accompany the release of "Cheyenne" was first released onto YouTube on 21 November 2019. The video was directed by Jacopo Farina.

== Live performances ==
On 28 November 2019, Michielin sang "Cheyenne" during the sixth live show of the thirteenth season of X Factor. She also performed the song during the 2020 International Workers' Day concert, annually supported by Italian trade unions CGIL, CISL and UIL. As a consequence of the COVID-19 pandemic, the event was adapted to a televised show without any audience, and Michielin contributed with a set from a panoramic corner in her hometown Bassano del Grappa.

== Charts ==
Chart (2019)	Peak position
Italy (FIMI)	66

== Certifications ==
Region	Certification	Certified units/sales
Italy (FIMI)	Gold	35,000^{‡}
^{‡} Sales+streaming figures based on certification alone.

== Release history ==
Region	Date	Format	Label
Italy	15 November 2019	Digital download	RCA Records
