= Amazing (Francesca Michielin song) =

Single by Francesca Michielin
- Released: 28 March 2014
- Recorded: 2013
- Genre: Pop
- Length: 3:27
- Label: Sony Music Entertainment Italy
- Songwriters: Negin Djafari; Fausto Cogliati; Francesca Michielin
- Producer: Fausto Cogliati

Francesca Michielin singles chronology
"Cigno nero" (2013)	"Amazing" (2014)	"Magnifico" (2014)

"Amazing" is a song performed by Italian singer Francesca Michielin. The song was released as a digital download on 28 March 2014 through Sony Music Entertainment Italy. The song peaked at number 74 on the Italian Singles Chart. The song, entirely composed in English was written by Michielin with Fausto Cogliati and Negin Djafari for the Italian version of the soundtrack of The Amazing Spider-Man 2.

== Music video ==
A music video to accompany the release of "Amazing" was first released onto YouTube on 11 April 2014 at a total length of three minutes and forty-five seconds. It was published alongside Alicia Keys and Kendrick Lamar's original duet "It's On Again" for the film.

== Track listing ==
Digital download
No.	Title	Length
1.	"Amazing"	3:27

== Charts ==
Chart (2014)	Peak position
Italy (FIMI)	67

== Release history ==
Region	Date	Format	Label
Italy	28 March 2014	Digital download	Sony Music Entertainment Italy
