= Magnifico (song) =

Single by Fedez featuring Francesca Michielin

from the album Pop-Hoolista
- Language: Italian
- Released: 31 October 2014
- Recorded: 2014
- Genre: Pop rap
- Length: 3:23
- Label: Sony Music Entertainment Italy
- Songwriters: Federico Lucia; Roberto Casalino; Dario Faini
- Producer: Twice as Nice

Fedez singles chronology
"Generazione bho" (2014)	"Magnifico" (2014)	"L'amore eternit" (2015)

Francesca Michielin singles chronology
"Amazing" (2014)	"Magnifico" (2014)	"L'amore esiste" (2015)

Music video
- "Magnifico" on YouTube

"Magnifico" is a song co-written and recorded by Italian rapper Fedez with featured vocals by Italian singer Francesca Michielin. It was released 31 October 2014 through Sony Music Entertainment Italy as the second single from his fourth studio album Pop-Hoolista.

The song was originally written by Roberto Casalino and Dario Faini, and later re-worked by Fedez, who added rap verses on the song. It peaked at number 1 on the Italian Singles Chart.

== Music video ==
A music video to accompany the release of "Magnifico" was first released onto YouTube on 31 October 2014 at a total length of three minutes and thirty-eight seconds. Fedez and Francesca are seen alternating each other with their part. Fedez is accompanied by different women who come and go one after another. At the last scene every body is seen together in chorus, singing together.

== Chart ==
Chart performance for "Magnifico"
Chart (2014)	Peak position
Italy (FIMI)	1

=== Year-end charts ===
Chart performance for "Magnifico"
Chart (2014)	Position
Italy (FIMI)	22
Chart (2015)	Position
Italy (FIMI)	13

== Certifications ==
Certifications for "Magnifico"
Region	Certification	Certified units/sales
Italy (FIMI)	6× Platinum	300,000^{‡}
^{‡} Sales+streaming figures based on certification alone.

== Release history ==
Region	Date	Format	Label
Italy	31 October 2014	Digital download	Sony Music Entertainment Italy
