= Cigno nero =

Single by Fedez featuring Francesca Michielin

from the album Sig. Brainwash - L'arte di accontentare
- Released: 1 March 2013
- Recorded: 2012
- Genre: Pop rap
- Length: 3:21
- Label: Sony Music
- Songwriters: Federico Lucia; Francesca Michielin; Fausto Cogliati
- Producer: Franco Godi

Fedez singles chronology
"Dai cazzo Federico" (2013)	"Cigno nero" (2013)	"Alfonso Signorini (eroe nazionale)" (2013)

Francesca Michielin singles chronology
"Se cadrai" (2013)	"Cigno nero" (2013)	"Amazing" (2014)

Music video
- "Cigno nero" on YouTube

"Cigno nero" (lit. 'Black Swan') is a song written and recorded by Italian rapper Fedez with featured vocals by Italian singer Francesca Michielin. The song was released on 1 March 2013 by Sony Music as the third single from his third studio album Sig. Brainwash - L'arte di accontentare.

== Music video ==
The music video for "Cigno nero", directed by Fabio Berton and Andrea Rebuscini, was released on 4 March 2013 via Fedez's YouTube channel.

== Track listing ==
Digital download
No.	Title	Length
1.	"Cigno nero" (feat. Francesca Michielin)	3:21

== Charts ==
Chart (2013)	Peak position
Italy (FIMI)	8

== Certifications ==
Region	Certification	Certified units/sales
Italy (FIMI)	2× Platinum	60,000^{‡}
^{‡} Sales+streaming figures based on certification alone.
