= Thegiornalisti =

Italian band

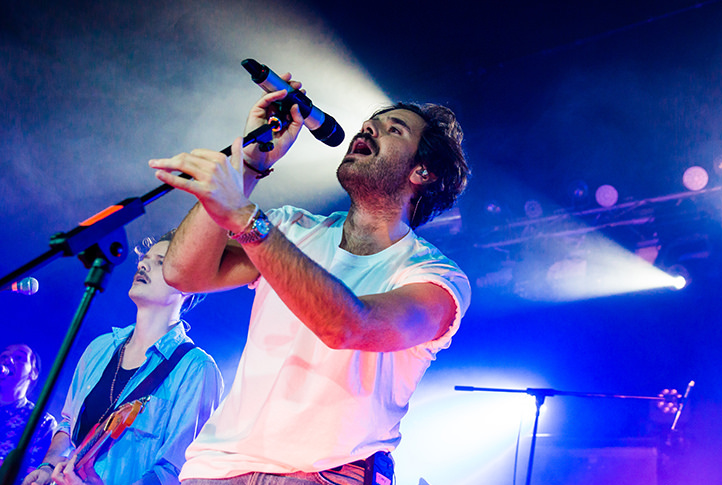
- Thegiornalisti in 2016

Background information
- Origin: Rome, Lazio, Italy
- Genres: Pop; Indie pop
- Years active: 2009–2019
- Label: Carosello Records
- Past members: Tommaso Paradiso; Marco Antonio Musella; Marco Primavera

Thegiornalisti (lit. 'The-journalists') was an Italian indie pop band formed in 2009.

They debuted in 2011 with the album Vol. 1, but they reached recognition with the third album Fuoricampo, released in 2014, which led them to sign with label Carosello.

On 21 June 2017, the band released the single "Riccione", which became a summer hit and peaked number 1 on Italy's Singles and Albums Charts, ranked by FIMI. Their fifth album Love reached the top of the weekly chart of the best-selling albums in September 2018.

In 2019, frontman Tommaso Paradiso left the band in order to start a solo career.

== Discography ==
=== Albums ===
Title	Album details	Peak chart positions		Certifications
Title	Album details	ITA	SWI	Certifications
Vol. 1	Released: 3 September 2011; Label: Boombica Records; Formats: CD, digital download	—	—	
Vecchio	Released: 24 September 2012; Label: Boombica Records; Formats: CD, digital download	—	—	
Fuoricampo	Released: 18 October 2014; Label: Foolica Records; Formats: CD, digital download, streaming	—	—	
Completamente Sold Out	Released: 21 October 2016; Label: Carosello Records; Formats: CD, digital download, streaming	11	—	FIMI: Platinum
Love	Released: 21 September 2018; Label: Carosello Records; Formats: CD, digital download, streaming	1	36	FIMI: 3× Platinum

=== Extended plays ===
- Canzoni fuori (2012)

=== Singles ===
Song	Year	Peak positions	Certification	Album
Song	Year	ITA	Certification	Album
"Siamo tutti marziani"	2011	—		Vol. 1
"Promiscuità"	2014	—		Fuoricampo
"Mare Balotelli"	2014	—		Fuoricampo
"Fine dell'estate"	2014	—		Fuoricampo
"Tra la strada e le stelle"	2016	—	FIMI: Gold	Completamente Sold Out
"Il tuo maglione mio"	2016	—	FIMI: Gold	Completamente Sold Out
"Completamente"	2016	54	FIMI: 3× Platinum	Completamente Sold Out
"Sold Out"	2017	—	FIMI: Platinum	Completamente Sold Out
"Senza"	2017	—	FIMI: Gold	/
"Pamplona" (with Fabri Fibra)	2017	4	FIMI: 4× Platinum	/
"Non caderci mai più"	2017	—		/
"Riccione"	2017	1	FIMI: 4× Platinum	/
"Questa nostra stupida canzone d'amore"	2018	5	FIMI: 3× Platinum	Love
"Felicità puttana"	2018	2	FIMI: 4× Platinum	Love
"New York"	2018	7	FIMI: Platinum	Love
"Maradona y Pelé"	2019	7	FIMI: 2× Platinum	/
