= Francesca Michielin =

Italian singer-songwriter, multi-instrumentalist and television presenter (born 1995)

- Francesca Michielin at the 83rd Venice Film Festival, 12 September 2026
- Born: 25 February 1995 (age 31); Bassano del Grappa, Veneto, Italy
- Occupations: Singer; songwriter; multi-instrumentalist; television presenter; author
- Spouse: Davide Spigarolo (m. 2026)
- Relatives: Gabriella Dorio (mother-in-law)
- Musical career
- Genres: Pop; rock; EDM
- Instruments: Vocals; piano; guitar; bass; pump organ; synth; timpani
- Works: Discography
- Years active: 2011–present
- Labels: Sony Music (2012–present); RCA (2012–2020); Columbia (2021–present)

Logo
- Website: francescamichielin.it

Francesca Michielin (Italian: [franˈtʃeska mikjeˈlin], Venetian: [mikjeˈliŋ]; born 25 February 1995) is an Italian singer-songwriter, multi-instrumentalist and television presenter. She rose to fame after winning the fifth season of the Italian talent show X Factor, she published five studio albums and several successful singles, peaking four times at number one on the Italian singles chart and selling over 1.3 million copies in Italy.

Her first single, "Distratto", debuted atop the Italian Singles Charts, becoming the first female winner of X Factor to achieve it. Michielin's debut studio album, Riflessi di me, was released in October 2012, preceded by the single "Sola". Between 2013 and 2014 she recorded two commercially successful collaborations with Italian rapper Fedez "Cigno nero" and "Magnifico". During the following years, she released the albums di20 (2015) and 2640 (2018), and several hit singles, including "L'amore esiste" (2015), "Nessun grado di separazione" (2016), "Vulcano" (2017) and "Io non abito al mare" (2017). In 2020 Michielin published her fourth studio album Feat (stato di natura) with the lead single "Cheyenne", followed by Cani sciolti in 2023.

During her career, Michielin has competed thrice in the Sanremo Music Festival, placing second both in 2016 with "Nessun grado di separazione" and in 2021 with "Chiamami per nome", performed with Fedez, while coming 21st in 2025 with "Fango in paradiso". In 2016 she went on to represent Italy in the Eurovision Song Contest. She was nominated at the MTV Europe Music Award for Best Italian Act, MTV Italian Music Awards and at the italian cinematography awards David di Donatello and Nastro d'Argento for her original song "Nei tuoi occhi".

Michielin also co-wrote and produced songs with several Italian artists, including Måneskin, Giorgia, Elisa, Fabri Fibra, Carl Brave, Coma Cose, Emma Marrone and Gaia. In 2022 Michielin debuted as a novelist with the book Il cuore è un organo and hosted the docu-series Effetto serra and the new seasons of X Factor.

== Early life ==
Michielin was born in Bassano del Grappa, in the region of Veneto, to Vanna Moro and Tiziano Michielin. She has an older brother, Filippo. Her first experience with playing music came from studying piano, when she was 9-years-old. She later started studying electric bass. At the age of fourteen, she started singing in her hometown's gospel choir. Thanks to her brother, she developed an interest in rock music, and she later focused on artists like Bon Iver, Jeff Buckley and Damien Rice. After listening to Adele's debut album 19, Michielin started writing her own songs on piano. During high school, she also founded a three-pieces punk rock girl band, named Monkey Nuts, in which she played bass.

Before rising to fame, she was a student at the third year of the liceo classico Brocchi in Bassano del Grappa. Starting from the school's fourth year, she only took exams as an external candidate, to continue pursuing her musical career. In July 2014, she obtained the maturity diploma at the Cavanis institute in Possagno. In March 2022, she was graduated in jazz singing with honours at the Conservatory Agostino Steffani in Castelfranco Veneto.

== Career ==
=== 2011–2012: X Factor and Riflessi di me ===
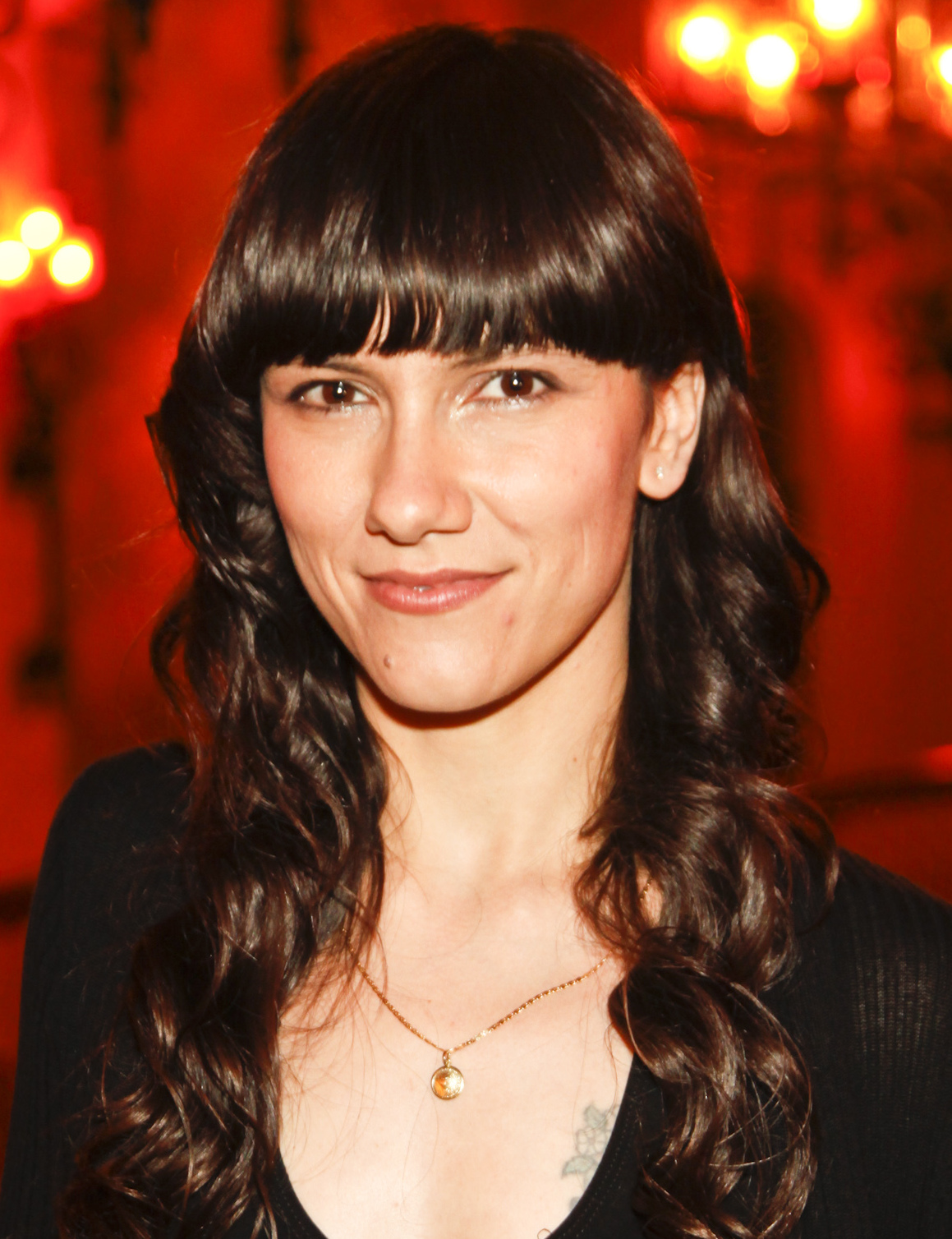
Elisa Toffoli co-wrote 7 songs from Riflessi di me, including the single "Distratto".

When she was sixteen, Michielin was asked to replace a soloist singer in a gospel concert. Her performance impressed a sound technician, who decided to register her for the auditions for the fifth series of X Factor, in 2011. She sang Led Zeppelin's "Whole Lotta Love", and she was chosen by her mentor Simona Ventura to be part of her team. During the live shows, she performed songs including Adele's "Someone Like You", "Roadhouse Blues" by The Doors, and Stevie Wonder's "Higher Ground".

On 29 December 2011, during the semi-final, Michielin premiered the song "Distratto", written by Elisa and Roberto Casalino. In the final on 5 January 2012, she was announced as the winner, beating runner up vocal group I Moderni. With her victory, she won a recording contract with Sony Music, with a stated value of €300,000.

Her debut single "Distratto" was released as a digital download EP on 6 January 2012. On 12 January 2012, the song debuted at number one on the Italian Singles Chart, it was later certified double platinum by the Federation of the Italian Music Industry, for domestic downloads exceeding 60,000 units, and it was the 10th best selling song of 2012 in Italy. The song was included in Michielin's debut EP, Distratto, which was released on 24 January 2012. The EP includes re-recorded versions of some of the songs she performed during the live shows. On 17 February 2012, Michielin appeared as a guest during the fourth night of the 62nd Sanremo Music Festival, performing the song "Al posto del mondo" with contestant Chiara Civello.

Michielin's second single, "Sola", was released on 31 August 2012. The single preceded her debut studio album, Riflessi di me, featuring collaborations with producer Andrea Rigonat and singer-songwriters Elisa and Roberto Casalino. Michielin has writing credits on three songs on the album, including the title-track, co-written with Elisa and Virginio Simonelli. Riflessi di me later spawned the singles "Tutto quello che ho" and "Se cadrai".

=== 2013–2014: Collaborations and "Amazing" ===
In March 2013, Michielin was featured on the song "Cigno nero" by Italian rapper Fedez. The song, co-written by Michielin herself, was included in Fedez's album Sig. Brainwash − L'arte di accontentare and was released as its second single.

In 2014, Michielin took part in the theatrical performance La ragazza con l'orecchino di perla, with music written by Franco Battiato. The show was held at Teatro Comunale di Bologna on 19 and 20 January 2014. On 28 March of the same year, Michielin released a new single, "Amazing". The song, entirely composed in English, was written by Michielin with Fausto Cogliati and Negin Djafari for the Italian version of the soundtrack of The Amazing Spider-Man 2.

In 2014, Michielin appeared on Fedez's track "Magnifico" for his album Pop-Hoolista. After being released as the album's second single, the song reached the top spot of the Italian singles chart, and it was certified triple platinum in Italy.

=== 2015–2016: di20, Sanremo Music Festival and Eurovision Song Contest ===
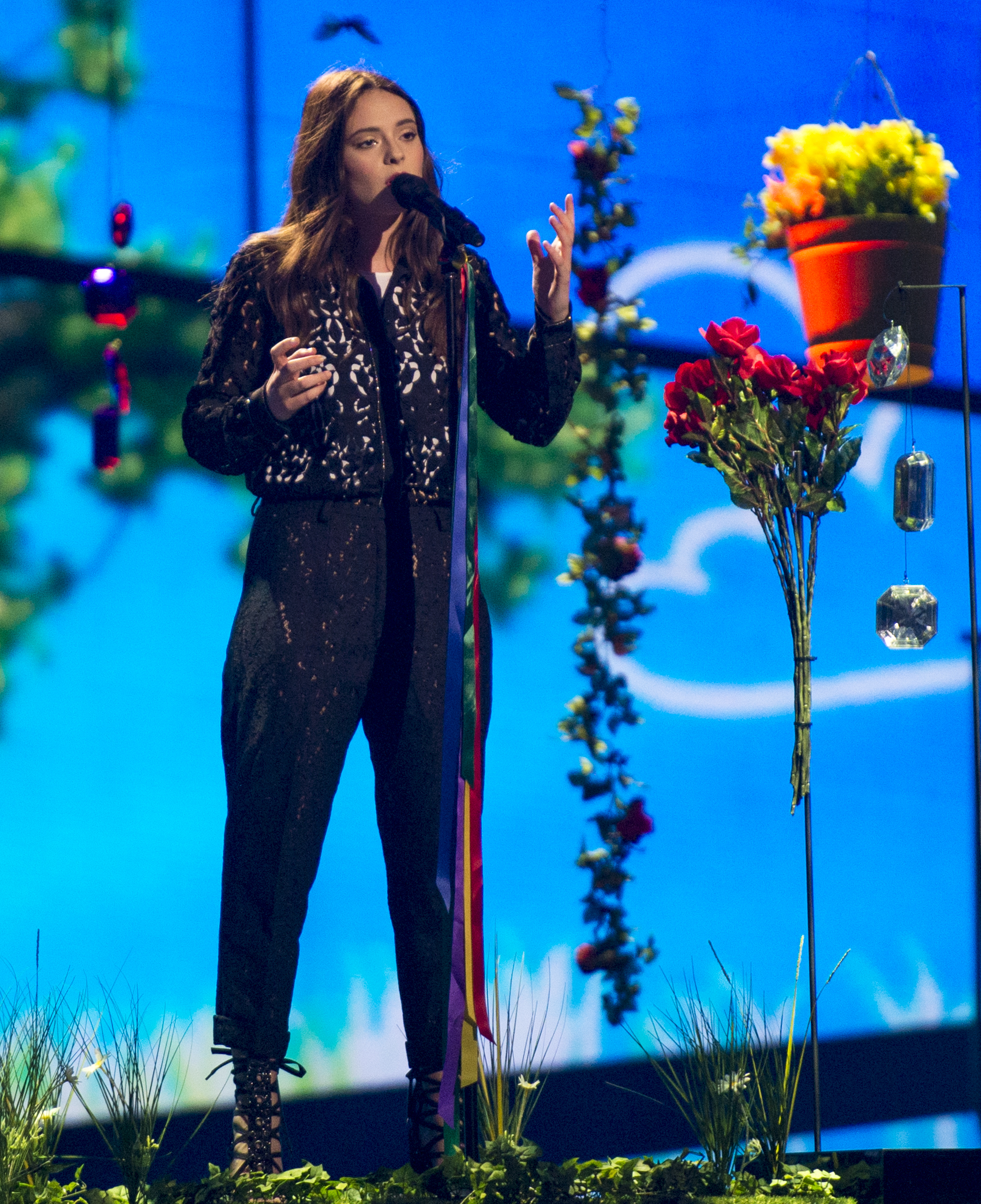
Michielin performing "No Degree of Separation" during rehearsals for the Eurovision Song Contest 2016

In April 2014, Michielin confirmed she was working on new material. The single "L'amore esiste", produced by Fortunato Zampaglione and Michele Canova, was released on 6 March 2015, ahead of her second studio album, di20. The song achieved commercial success, entering the top ten of the Italian FIMI Top Digital chart, and receiving the Lunezia Pop Award. "L'amore esiste" was followed by "Battito di ciglia", released on 10 July 2015, and "Lontano", released on 25 September 2015. To launch di20, Michielin performed at the Unicredit Pavilion in Milan on 21 October 2015, four days before the official release of the album.

In January 2016, Michielin also embarked on her first concert tour, titled Nice to Meet You. A live extended play was recorded during the show and released exclusively to digital stores on 30 January 2016. In February 2016, she competed in the 66th Sanremo Music Festival, performing the song "Nessun grado di separazione". The song placed second in the competition, behind Stadio's "Un giorno mi dirai". The band was then eligible to represent Italy in the Eurovision Song Contest 2016, but they declined, stating they would be on a previously planned tour in May 2016. Their decision led RAI to select Michielin as the Italian entry for the 61st edition of the European competition. Michielin's entry was a new version of "Nessun grado di separazione", featuring an English-language chorus and titled "No Degree of Separation". In the final she placed 16th out of 26. "Nessun grado di separazione" debuted atop the Italian singles chart and was included in di20are, a new edition of Michielin's second studio album.

On 3 June 2016, "Un cuore in due" was released as the album's fifth single. The music video was directed by Giacomo Triglia and was released on 13 June 2016. On 23 September 2016, "Almeno tu" was released as the album's sixth and final single. It was also included in the soundtrack of Piuma. A music video featuring Michielin as well as segments from the film was released on 24 September 2016.

=== 2017–2018: 2640 ===
In January 2017, Michielin announced through her Twitter account that she had started working in the studio on her third album, the title of which was later announced as 2640. The album was recorded in Los Angeles with producer Michele Canova. The album's lead single "Vulcano" was released on 21 July 2017, along with a music video directed by Giacomo Triglia and filmed between 10 pm and 5:30 am in Berlin. The song achieved a platinum certification in Italy. On 1 October 2017, Michielin performed "Vulcano" on Che tempo che fa and announced the album's release date as 12 January 2018. The album was made available to pre-order on 22 December 2017, with the song "Tropicale" as a pre-order bonus. In the meanwhile, she also performed the Italian national anthem as an opening to the 2017 Italian Grand Prix at the Autodromo Nazionale Monza.

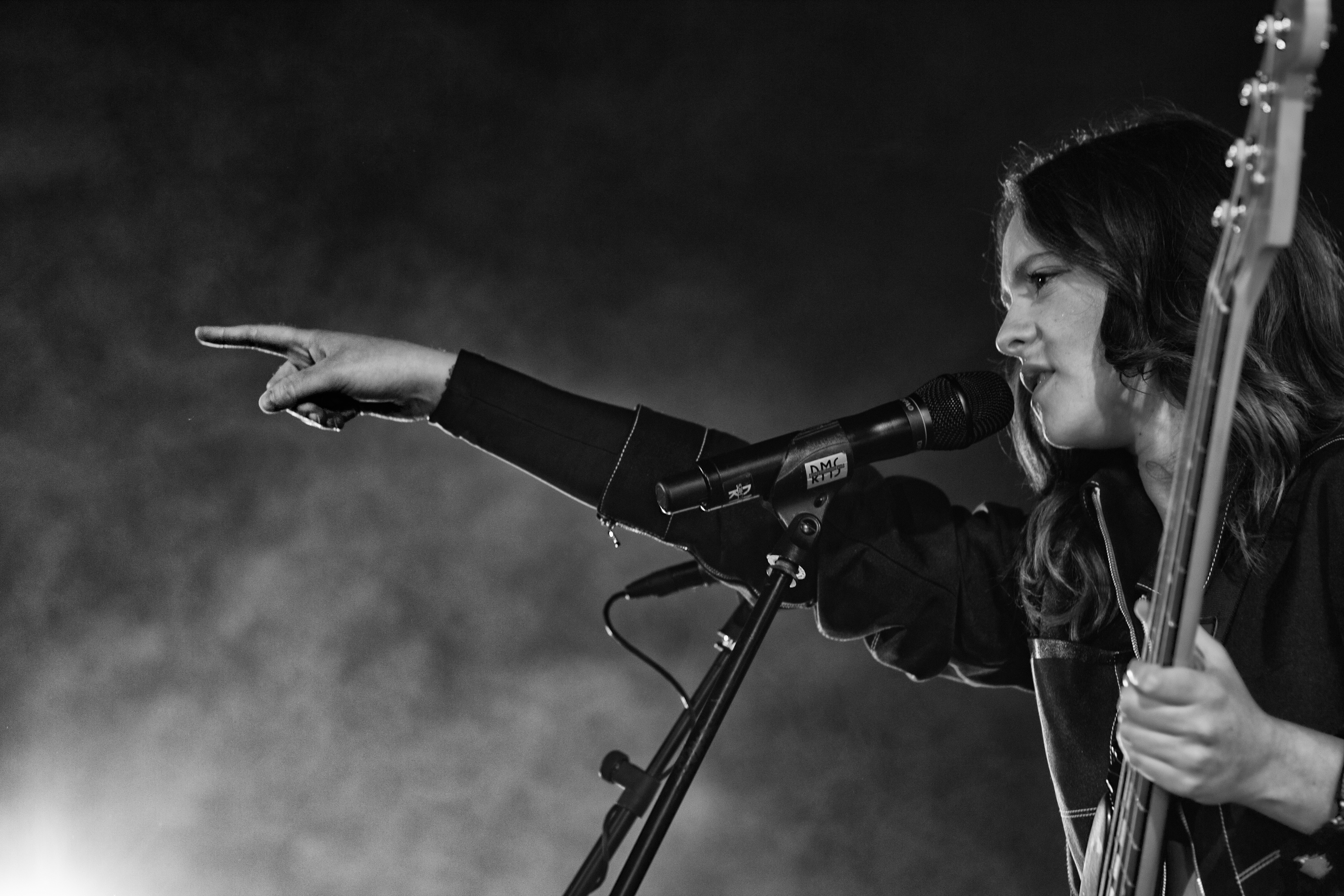
Francesca Michielin performing at the Teatro Quirinetta in 2018

"Io non abito al mare" was released on 17 November 2017 as the second single from 2640. Its music video, filmed at Cretto di Burri, was directed by Giacomo Triglia and released on 20 November 2017. Lyrically, the song speaks of the difficulty of communicating, the difference between feeling and listening and the desire to embrace, not to be afraid of showing that side of feeling that is pure tenderness. The song achieved a platinum certification in Italy.

"Bolivia" was released as the third single from the album on 16 March 2018. The music video was released on 20 March 2018. It was directed by Giacomo Triglia and the screenplay was written by Francesca Michielin. In an interview with Rolling Stone, Michielin said that the song is a criticism of people who chase change and run away to exotic and remote places with the idea of living a more genuine life and making a difference, without realising that the problem to be solved is often within them.

"Tropicale" was released as the fourth single on 15 June 2018, along with a music video. In May 2018, Michielin also provided featured vocals, together with rapper Fabri Fibra, on the single "Fotografia" by Italian recording artist Carl Brave. On 16 November 2018, Michielin released a new song, "Femme", written by Michielin and Calcutta and remixed by Bruno Belissimo. A vinyl edition of 2640 was released on 7 December 2018, including the original 13 tracks as well as "Femme", "Fotografia" and the demo of "Tropicale".

Michielin composed the original soundtrack for the short film A Cup of Coffee with Marylin, which was directed by Alessandra Gonnella and which premiered at the 2019 Cannes Film Festival.

=== 2019–2021: Feat (Stato di natura) ===
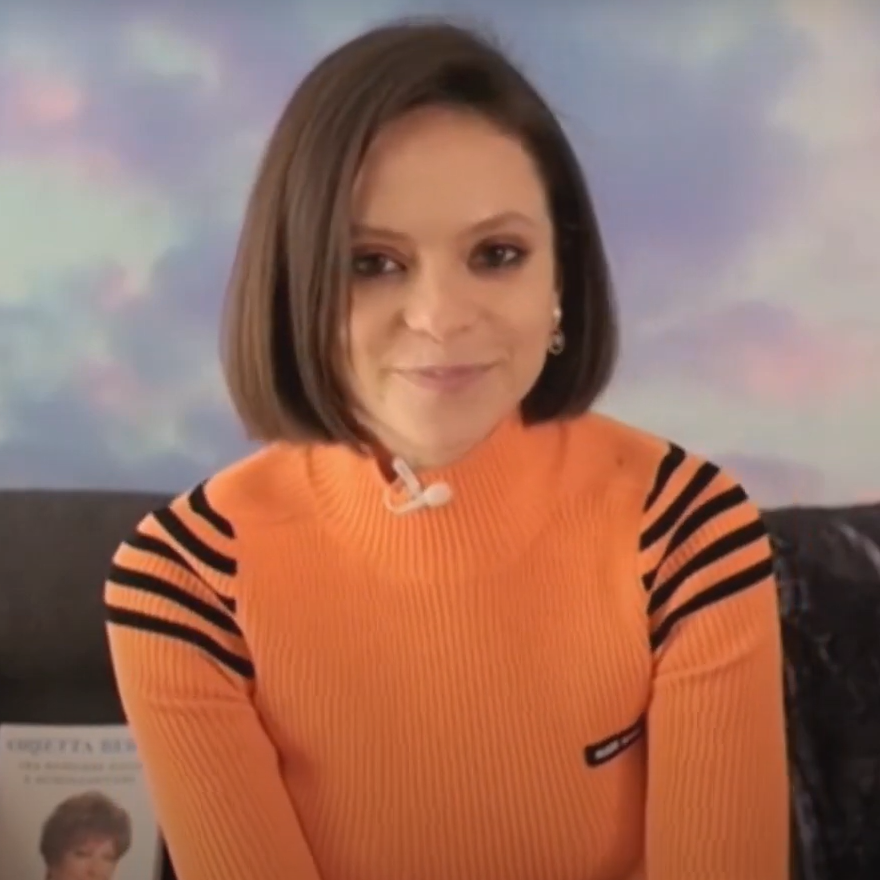
Francesca Michielin during an interview in 2021

Michelin began teasing her musical return on her social media accounts on 8 November 2019, culminating in the announcement of the single "Cheyenne" featuring Charlie Charles, which was released on 15 November 2019 as the lead single from Michielin's fourth studio album. Titled Feat (stato di natura) and released on 13 March 2020, the album included 11 tracks, all of which featured other artists, with the main theme being the contrast and union between urban and natural environments. It was set to be preceded by three concerts, each with a different location, theme and arrangement. A new song from the album was premiered during each event, and released on the following day—"Gange", featuring Italian rapper Shiva, was released after the performance which took place at the Rocket nightclub on 20 February 2020; "Riserva naturale", featuring Coma Cose, premiered on 27 February 2020 during a show which was set to take place at the Serraglio nightclub, but was turned to a Facebook livestream session due to restrictions aimed at containing the outbreak of the COVID-19 pandemic in Italy. "Monolocale", featuring Fabri Fibra, debuted at the 5 March 2020 event, broadcast on RaiPlay. The album debuted and peaked at number 7 in Italy. The song "Stato di natura", featuring Måneskin, was released as the album's second single on 13 March 2020. On 3 April 2020, "Monolocale" was released as the album's third single.

In the meanwhile, Michielin performed a cover of Gianni Morandi, Enrico Ruggeri & Umberto Tozzi's "Si può dare di più" with Levante and Maria Antonietta for the third night of the 70th Sanremo Music Festival, on 6 February 2020. She was among the artists involved in the charity event Musica che unisce, created as a collage of home made contributions and performances recorded and broadcast during the COVID-19 lockdown, and she performed "Cheyenne" from a panoramic corner in her hometown Bassano del Grappa during the 2020 International Workers' Day concert, annually supported by Italian trade unions CGIL, CISL and UIL and adapted in 2020 to a televised show without any audience.

On 22 January 2021, Michielin released the song "Cattive stelle" with Vasco Brondi, as an addition to her previous album Feat (stato di natura). In February of the same year, she launched her podcast titled Maschiacci – Per cosa lottano le donne oggi?, interviewing celebrities about topics related to the fight against gender stereotypes. In March 2021, she performed the song "Chiamami per nome" with Fedez at the 71st Sanremo Music Festival. After being the bookmaker's favourite to be victorious in the contest, it placed second overall. This marked the pair's third collaboration, following 2013's "Cigno nero" and 2014's "Magnifico". The song reached number one in Italy. Michielin also dueted with Samuel on the single "Cinema", and later recorded the song "Nei tuoi occhi" for the soundtrack of the film Marilyn's Eyes.

=== 2022–present: Hosting debut and Cani sciolti ===
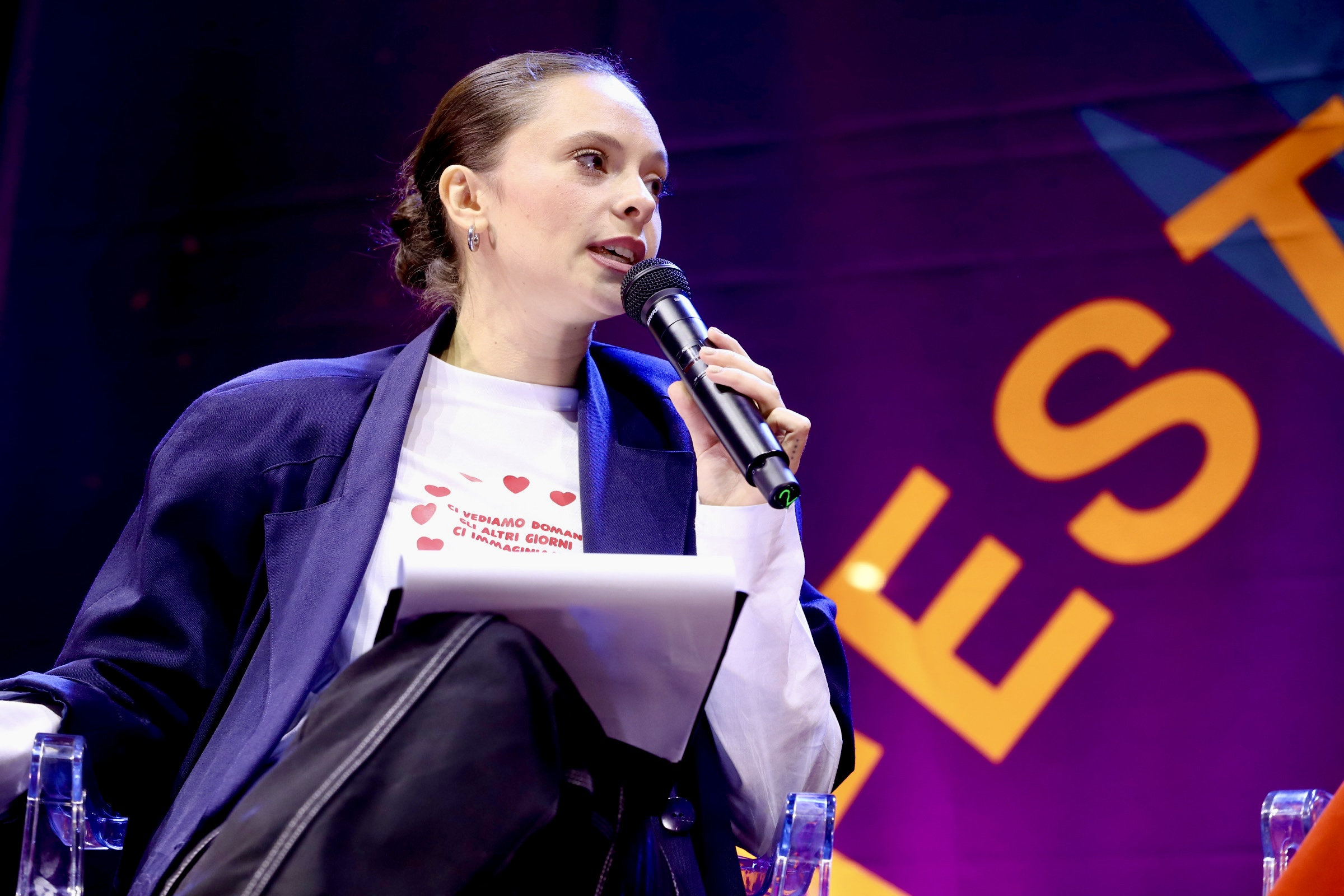
Michielin in 2024

Michielin was the orchestra conductor at the Sanremo Music Festival 2022 during Emma Marrone's performances of her entry "Ogni volta è così", and she dueted with her on a cover version of "...Baby One More Time". Shortly after, Michielin graduated in Jazz Singing at the Conservatorio Agostino Steffani in Castelfranco Veneto. In mid-2021, she also started working on Effetto serra, a TV programme for Sky Nature, interviewing experts about sustainable individual behaviours. Her debut novel, titled Il cuore è un organo, was published on 15 March 2022 by Mondadori.

In March 2022, Michielin debuted as a record producer on the track "Liberi", included on the album Caos by Italian rapper Fabri Fibra. The track also features Michielin's vocals. Her singles "Bonsoir", a pop song produced by Dario Faini, and "Occhi grandi grandi", a track influenced by rock and nu metal, were released on 1 July 2022 and on 9 September 2022, respectively.

In Fall 2022 Michielin returned at X Factor, replacing Ludovico Tersigni as the host of the sixteenth series of the show. In the meanwhile, she started a series of six live shows at a small venue in Milan, the Mosso. A tour celebrating the first ten years of Michielin's career, named Bonsoir! – Michielin10, took place in Italian theatres between February 2023 and April 2023. Michielin's fifth studio album, Cani sciolti, was released on 24 February 2023. In the same year, she was confirmed as the X Factor host for a second series.

In December 2024, Michielin was announced as one of the participants in the Sanremo Music Festival 2025 with the song "Fango in paradiso". She ultimately placed 21st. Shortly after the contest, she parted ways with her manager Marta Donà, explaining she wanted to pursue a new musical direction and start a new phase in her career. In October 2025, "Fango in paradiso" was included in the EP Anime, preceded by the auto-biographical single "Francesca", launched in May 2025, and by the song "È naturale", recorded with Italian electronic band Planet Funk.

On 4 October 2025 Michielin held her first concert at the Verona Arena, titled Tutto in una notte. The concert, with an audience of 10,000 people, was conceived as a celebration of her 30 years, and featured several guests, including Elisa, Carmen Consoli, Emma, Fiorella Mannoia, Irama and Tommaso Paradiso. She also announced a tour of Italian theaters, scheduled for fall 2026.

== Personal life ==
In 2022, Michielin started a relationship with childhood friend Davide Spigarolo, an osteopath and personal trainer, son of Italian former athlete and Olympic gold winner Gabriella Dorio. The couple, who had lived together since 2024, was married in a Christian ceremony on 26 June 2026.

Michielin revealed that she suffered from mental health issues and began psychotherapy immediately after winning X Factor at the age of sixteen. In August 2023, after experiencing abdominal pain for several months, she underwent a nephrectomy. To overcome the psychological trauma associated with the surgery, she subsequently underwent EMDR therapy.

She is a supporter of Juventus FC, and an avid fan of Formula One.

== Discography ==
- Riflessi di me (2012)
- di20 (2015)
- 2640 (2018)
- Feat (stato di natura) (2020)
- Cani sciolti (2023)
- Magia bianca (2026)

== Filmography ==
Year	Title	Role	Notes
2020	Trolls World Tour	Queen Poppy	Voice role (Italian dub)
2021	The Ferragnez: The Series	Herself	TV docuseries (2 episodes)
2022	Effetto Terra	Herself / Interviewer	TV documentary
2025	Bambi: Una vita nei boschi	Narrator	Voice role (Italian dub)
2026	Becoming Her: Prima di diventare grandi	Narrator	Voice role

== Television ==
Television programmes
Year	Title	Role	Notes
2022–2023	X Factor	Host	Talent Show
2024	Gialappa Show	Co-host	Comedy show (1 episode)
2024	Diversity Media Awards	Host	Awards ceremony
2026	RIP: Roast in Peace	Guest	Comedy show (season 2)

== Written works ==
Year	Title	Notes
2022	Il cuore è un organo	Novel
2026	Supergirl: Riflessione Oscura	Comic book

== Awards and nominations ==
Year	Award	Nomination	Work	Result
2012	Premio Videoclip Italiano	Best Video by an Emerging Artist	"Distratto"	Won
2012	Rockol Awards	Most Promising Italian Artist/Italian Revelation of the Year	Herself	Won
2015	Lunezia Award	Lunezia Pop Award	"L'amore esiste"	Won
2016	Onstage Awards	Italian Talent of the Future	Herself	Nominated
2016	MTV Italian Music Awards	Best Italian Female	Herself	Nominated
2016	MTV Europe Music Awards	Best Italian Act	Herself	Nominated
2017	MTV Italian Music Awards	Best Italian Female	Herself	Nominated
2019	Amnesty Award	Voices for Freedom	"Bolivia"	Nominated
2020	Premio Cortinametraggio	Best Soundtrack	A Cup of Coffee with Marylin (with Tommaso Ermolli)	Won
2021	Amnesty Award	Voices for Freedom	"Stato di natura" (with Måneskin)	Nominated
2022	Rockol Awards	Best Italian Album	Feat (Fuori dagli spazi)	Nominated
2022	David di Donatello	Best Original Song	"Nei tuoi occhi"	Nominated
2022	Nastro d'Argento	Best Original Song	"Nei tuoi occhi"	Nominated
2022	Ciak d'oro	Best Original Song	"Nei tuoi occhi"	Nominated
2023	Rockol Awards	Best Album	Cani sciolti	Nominated
2023	Rockol Awards	Best Live	L'Estate dei Cani Sciolti Tour	Nominated
2025	Lunezia Award	Lunezia Pop Award	"Francesca"	Won
2026	Billboard Italia Women in Music	Songwriter of the Year	Herself	Won

Awards and achievements
Preceded by Nathalie	Italian X Factor; Winner; 2012	Succeeded by Chiara Galiazzo
Preceded by Il Volo with "Grande amore"	Italy in the Eurovision Song Contest; 2016	Succeeded by Francesco Gabbani with "Occidentali's Karma"
