= Fedez =

Italian rapper (born 1989)

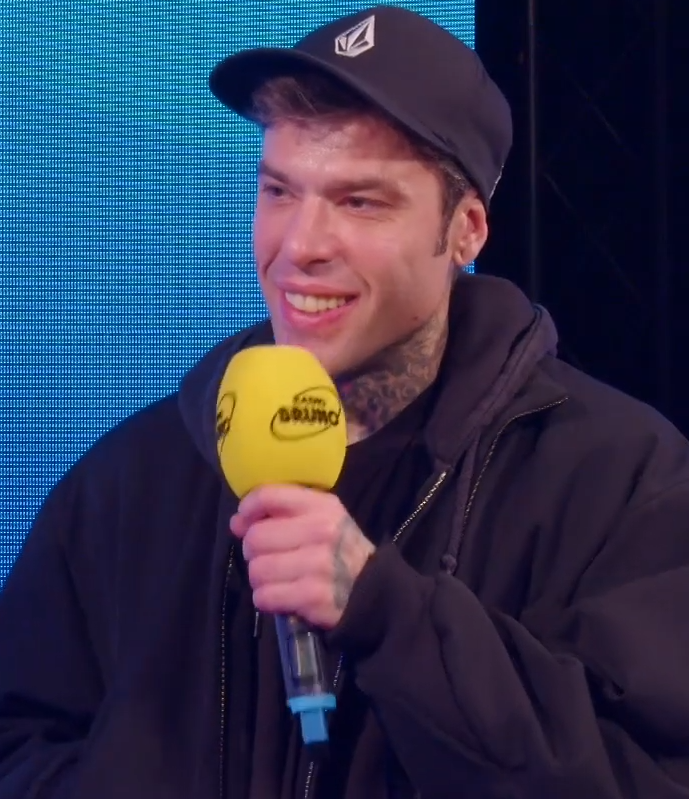
- Fedez in February 2025
- Born: Federico Leonardo Lucia; 15 October 1989 (age 37); Milan, Lombardy, Italy
- Occupations: Rapper; singer; songwriter; social media personality; businessman
- Years active: 2006–present
- Spouse: Chiara Ferragni (m. 2018; div. 2025)
- Children: 3
- Musical career
- Origin: Buccinasco, Lombardy, Italy
- Genres: Pop rap; hip hop
- Instrument: Vocals
- Works: Discography
- Label: Tanta Roba (2011–2012); Best Sound (2012–2013); DOOM Entertainment (2013–present); Sony Music (2013–2023); Epic (2013–2020); Columbia (2020–2022); Warner Music Italy (2023–present); Atlantic Italy (2025–present)

Federico Leonardo Lucia (born 15 October 1989), better known by the stage name Fedez (Italian: [ˈfɛːdets]), is an Italian rapper, singer-songwriter, social media personality, and businessman.

In 2011, he released the albums Penisola che non c'è and Il mio primo disco da venduto, released as free digital downloads. His first studio album, Sig. Brainwash - L'arte di accontentare, was released in 2013, and it debuted at number one on the Italian Albums Chart. The album, which spawned three singles, including the top 10 hit "Cigno nero" featuring Francesca Michielin, was later certified 3× Platinum by the Federation of the Italian Music Industry. As of September 2024, Fedez has 5 No. 1 studio albums, 32 top ten singles (12 of which peaked at No. 1) and over 50 Platinum certifications.

== Biography ==
Federico Leonardo Lucia was born in Milan on 15 October 1989. He spent his childhood in Buccinasco and Corsico, located within the province of Milan, before relocating to Rozzano.

=== Career ===
In 2011, Fedez recorded his first self-produced album with a budget of only €500, titled Penisola che non c'è. The album, released as a free digital download, was entirely composed of songs about political and social issues. Later in 2011, Fedez signed with the label Tanta Roba, founded by Guè Pequeno and DJ Harsh. The label produced his second free album, Il mio primo disco da venduto, released as a digital download in November of the same year.

In June 2012, Fedez appeared in a new version of 883's song "Jolly Blue", included on the album Hanno ucciso l'Uomo Ragno 2012, recorded by the band's frontman Max Pezzali to celebrate the twentieth anniversary since the release of their first full-length album, Hanno ucciso l'Uomo Ragno.

In January 2013, Fedez released his first single for a major label, "Si scrive schiavitù si legge libertà". The song was later included in the album Sig. Brainwash - L'arte di accontentare, released by Sony Music on 5 March 2013. The album was also preceded by the top ten single "Cigno nero", performed with Francesca Michielin, which was also certified platinum by the Federation of the Italian Music Industry. The album debuted at number one on the Italian Albums Chart, and it was later certified triple platinum denoting sales exceeding 180,000 units. To promote the album, Fedez embarked on a tour starting from 12 April 2013 in Turin. The album also spawned the single "Alfonso Signorini (eroe nazionale)", whose music video features Italian TV personalities Alfonso Signorini and Raffaella Fico.

In June 2013, Fedez was also a guest judge during the auditions of the seventh season of the Italian talent show X Factor. In May 2014, it was announced that Fedez and Victoria Cabello would replace Elio and Simona Ventura as judges on the eighth season of the Italian version of X Factor alongside Morgan and Mika. His fourth studio album, Pop-Hoolista, was released on 30 September 2014. Predeced by the single "Generazione boh", the record also includes duets with Malika Ayane, Francesca Michielin, Noemi, Elisa and J-Ax. The album debuted atop the Italian Albums Chart, and it was certified gold one week after its release.

In 2021, Fedez was one of the acts competing in the Sanremo Music Festival; dueting with long-time collaborator Francesca Michielin, the pair performed their song "Chiamami per nome" (Call me by my name) and finished second. In the same year, Fedez also hosted the program LOL - Chi ride è fuori together with Mara Maionchi. In June, he released the single "Mille", a collaboration with Achille Lauro and Orietta Berti; the song peaked at number 1 in Italy, giving Fedez his tenth number one song.

On 1 November 2021, he announced his sixth album Disumano (Inhuman), which was released on 26 November, simultaneously with the single "Sapore", in collaboration with Tedua. On 3 June 2022 he published summer hit "La dolce vita", a collaboration with Tananai and Mara Sattei. Another summer hit, Disco Paradise, released in May 2023, is a collaboration with Annalisa and Articolo 31.

In December 2024, Fedez was announced as one of the participants in the Sanremo Music Festival 2025 with the song "Battito". He finished in 4th place. On 30 November 2025, Fedez and Marco Masini were announced among the participants of the Sanremo Music Festival 2026. They competed with the song "Male necessario" which was released on 25 February 2026.

== Personal life ==
Fedez proposed to Chiara Ferragni, an Italian fashion blogger and entrepreneur, on 6 May 2017 during his concert in Verona. The concert and proposal were broadcast live on the Italian radio and TV channel RTL 102.5. They have a son born in 2018, and a daughter born in 2021. Fedez and Ferragni married in Noto, Sicily, on 1 September 2018. The couple split in early 2024 and divorced in mid-2025.

On 17 March 2022, Fedez shared via Instagram that he was seriously ill with a newly diagnosed disease. On 24 March 2022, he revealed that he had received surgery at San Raffaele Hospital in Milan on 22 March 2022 for removal of a rare pancreatic neuroendocrine tumour. The surgery, which lasted six hours and involved a partial pancreatectomy, was reported to have gone well. On 9 April 2024, in an interview on Belve on Rai 2, Fedez declared that he had attempted suicide at the age of 18.

In 2024, following an altercation in a club, he was investigated for affray and assault against a personal trainer in Milan's nightlife scene. In fact, after the altercation, the personal trainer was the victim of a punitive expedition. Following an agreement between Fedez and the trainer, the judge decides for the dismissal of the proceedings, in the absence of a complaint (required by Italian Code of Criminal Procedure) and because the incident was found to be not a affray but rather an attack by several individuals against one. The investigations revealed business and friendship relationships between Fedez and figures linked to the Milanese far right and 'Ndrangheta.

== Activism ==
In 2020, Fedez raised €3 million in 24 hours through a fundraiser with Chiara Ferragni to support the San Raffaele hospital in Milan during the COVID-19 pandemic in Italy.

Fedez is an avid supporter of LGBT rights. In 2021, right after a performance with Francesca Michielin at the First May Concert, the rapper interrupted the concert by reading a speech in defense of Ddl Zan, a proposed act to protect fragile groups from abuse (such as women, the disabled, and the LGBTQ+ community), reading homophobic quotes said by members of the Lega Nord political party, including Matteo Salvini, Simone Pillon, Giovanni De Paoli, Andrea Ostellari and Alessandro Rinaldi. Fedez also spoke about freedom of expression, accusing the apex of Rai3, Ilaria Capitani and Franco Di Mare, of having asked him to stop his speech because it was seen as "inappropriate in that context"; Rai3 denied the accusation of attempted censorship and Fedez published a phone call which, he stated, showed the attempted censorship by the network.

== Endorsements ==
Throughout his career, Fedez has endorsed multiple brands, including Puma, Samsung, Bershka, Intimissimi, Sisley, Swarovski, Yamamay and Amazon.

== Discography ==
- Penisola che non c'è (2011)
- Il mio primo disco da venduto (2011)
- Sig. Brainwash - L'arte di accontentare (2013)
- Pop-Hoolista (2014)
- Comunisti col Rolex with J-Ax (2017)
- Paranoia Airlines (2019)
- Disumano (2021)

== Filmography ==
Year	Title	Role	Notes
2016	Zeta: Una storia hip hop	Jab	Film
2017	Un passo dal cielo	Himself (fictional version)	Recurring role (season 4)
2019	Chiara Ferragni: Unposted	Himself	Film
2021	The Ferragnez	Himself	Docuseries
2021	Space Jam: A New Legacy	Wet-fire	Voice role (Italian dub)

== Television ==
Year	Title	Role	Notes
2020	Celebrity Hunted: Caccia all'uomo	Contestant	Reality show (season 1); 6 episodes
2021	Sanremo Music Festival 2021	Contestant	Annual music festival (runner-up)
2021–2024	LOL - Chi ride è fuori	Host	Reality show (season 1–4)
2024	Belve	Interviewee	Interview show (season 10)
2025	Sanremo Music Festival 2025	Contestant	Annual music festival (4th place)
2026	Sanremo Music Festival 2026	Contestant	Annual music festival
2026	RIP: Roast in Peace	Roastee	Comedy show (season 2)

== Awards and nominations ==
Year	Ceremony	Category	Work	Result
2013	MTV Europe Music Awards	Best Italian Act	Himself	Nominated
2013	Italian MTV Awards	InstaVIP Award	Himself	Won
2013	Italian MTV Awards	Superman Award	Himself	Nominated
2015	Lunezia Award	Pop-Rap Award	Pop-Hoolista	Won
2015	MTV Europe Music Awards	Best Italian Act	Himself	Nominated
