= Noemi discography =

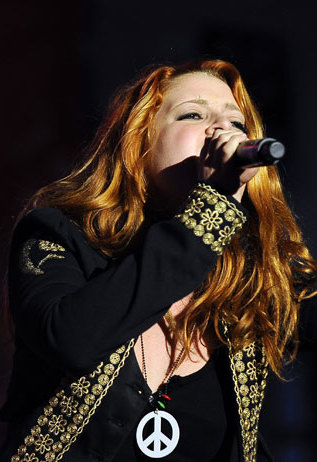
Noemi onstage in 2009 at Rome, Italy

The discography of Italian singer Noemi is composed of six studio albums, a live album, an extended play and 23 singles as a lead artist.

== Albums ==
=== Studio albums ===
List of albums, with selected chart positions, sales, and certifications
Title	Album details	Peak chart positions		Certifications
Title	Album details	ITA	EU	Certifications
Sulla mia pelle	Released: 2 October 2009; Label: Sony Music Italy; Format: CD, download	3	42	FIMI: 2× Platinum
RossoNoemi	Released: 22 March 2011; Label: Sony Music Italy; Format: CD, download	6	—N/a	FIMI: Platinum
Made in London	Released: 20 February 2014; Label: Sony Music Italy; Format: CD, download	2	—N/a	
Cuore d'artista	Released: 12 February 2016; Label: Sony Music Italy; Format: CD, download	13	—N/a	
La luna	Released: 9 February 2018; Label: Sony Music Italy; Format: CD, download	13	—N/a	
Metamorfosi	Released: 5 March 2021; Label: Sony Music Italy; Format: CD, download	17	—N/a	FIMI: Gold
Nostalgia	Released: 28 February 2025; Label: Sony Music Italy; Format: CD, download	7	—N/a	
"—" denotes albums that did not chart

=== Live albums ===
List of albums, with selected chart positions, sales, and certifications
Title	Album details	Peak chart positions
Title	Album details	ITA
RossoLive	Released: 18 September 2012; Label: Sony Music Italy; Format: CD, download	11

== Extended plays ==
List of albums, with selected chart positions, sales, and certifications
Title	EP details	Peak chart positions		Certifications
Title	EP details	ITA	EU	Certifications
Noemi	Released: 24 April 2009; Label: Sony Music Italy; Format: CD, download	8	97	FIMI: Gold

== Singles ==
=== As lead artist ===
List of singles, with chart positions, showing year released and album name
Title	Year	Peak chart positions		Certifications	Album or EP
Title	Year	ITA	EU	Certifications	Album or EP
"Briciole"	2009	2	100		Noemi
"L'amore si odia" (featuring Fiorella Mannoia)	2009	1	81	FIMI: 2× Platinum	Sulla mia pelle
"Per tutta la vita"	2010	1	81	FIMI: Platinum	Sulla mia pelle (Deluxe Edition)
"Vertigini"	2010	—	—		Sulla mia pelle (Deluxe Edition)
"Vuoto a perdere"	2011	6	—N/a	FIMI: Platinum	RossoNoemi
"Odio tutti i cantanti"	2011	—	—N/a		RossoNoemi
"Poi inventi il modo"	2011	—	—N/a		RossoNoemi
"Sono solo parole"	2012	3	—N/a	FIMI: 2× Platinum	RossoNoemi
"In un giorno qualunque"	2012	—	—N/a		RossoNoemi
"Se non è amore"	2012	46	—N/a		RossoLive
"Bagnati dal sole"	2014	8	—N/a	FIMI: Gold	Made in London
"Don't get me wrong"	2014	—	—N/a		Made in London
"Se tu fossi qui"	2014	—	—N/a		Made in London
"La borsa di un donna"	2016	29	—N/a		Cuore d’artista
"Fammi respirare dai tuoi occhi"	2016	—	—N/a		Cuore d’artista
"Idealista!"	2016	—	—N/a		Cuore d’artista
"Amen"	2016	—	—N/a		Cuore d’artista
"Autunno"	2017	—	—N/a		La luna
"I miei rimedi"	2017	97	—N/a		La luna
"Non smettere mai di cercarmi"	2018	19	—N/a		La luna
"Porcellana"	2018	—	—N/a		La luna
"Glicine"	2021	12	—N/a	FIMI: Platinum	Metamorfosi
"Makumba" (with Carl Brave)	2021	4	—N/a	FIMI: 3× Platinum	Metamorfosi
"Guardare giù"	2021	—	—N/a		Non-album singles
"Ti amo non lo so dire"	2022	11	—N/a	FIMI: Platinum	Non-album singles
"Hula-hoop" (with Carl Brave)	2022	35	—N/a	FIMI: Platinum	Non-album singles
"Fuori dai guai" (with Gemitaiz)	2022	—	—N/a		Non-album singles
"Non ho bisogno di te"	2024	—	—N/a		Non-album singles
"Se t'innamori muori"	2025	19	—N/a	FIMI: Gold	Nostalgia
"Non sono io"	2025	99	—N/a		Nostalgia
"Bianca"	2025	64	—N/a		Nostalgia
"Farfalle (nello stomaco)" (with Cioffi)	2026	—	—N/a		Non-album singles
"Tu cosa fai questa sera" (with Vito Salamanca)	2026	72	—N/a		Non-album singles
"—" denotes a recording that did not chart or was not released.

=== Featured singles ===
List of singles, with chart positions, showing year released and album name
Single	Year	Peak chart positions	Sales and Certifications	Album
Single	Year	ITA	Sales and Certifications	Album
"La promessa" (Stadio featuring Noemi)	2012	28		Diamanti e caramelle
"L'amore eternit" (Fedez featuring Noemi)	2015	6	ITA: 150.000; FIMI: 3× Platinum	Pop-Hoolista
"Ma il cielo è sempre più blu" (as part of Italian Allstars 4 Life)	2020	5		Charity single
"Ispirazione" (Inoki featuring Noemi)	2021	—		Medioego
"Oh ma" (Rocco Hunt featuring Noemi)	2025	21	FIMI: Gold	Ragazzo di giù
"—" denotes singles that did not chart

== Other charted songs ==
List of songs, with chart positions, showing year released and album name
Single	Year	Peak chart positions	Album
Single	Year	ITA	Album
"La costruzione di un amore"	2009	15	X Factor Finale Compilation 2009
"Canzone per te"	2009	36	

== Promotional singles ==
Year	Song	Album
2008	Albachiara	Noemi
2012	Il cielo toccherò	RossoLive
2012	Tra vento ed aria	RossoLive
2014	Acciaio	Made in London
2014	Un uomo è un albero	Made in London
2014	Alba	Made in London

== Other appearances ==
List of songs recorded by Noemi appearing on other albums
Contribution	Year	Album or DVD
"Albachiara"	2009	X Factor Compilation 2009 – Anteprima by Various Artists
"La costruzione di un amore"	2009	X Factor Compilation 2009 – Finale by Various Artists
"Quanto ti voglio" (Claudio Baglioni featuring Gianluca Grignani & Noemi)	2009	Q.P.G.A by Claudio Baglioni
"Il mio canto libero" (As part of Amiche per l'Abruzzo)	2010	Amiche per l'Abruzzo (DVD) by Various Artists
"Briciole" (Live version)	2010	Amiche per l'Abruzzo (DVD) by Various Artists
"L'amore si odia" (Live version, with Fiorella Mannoia)	2010	Il tempo e l'armonia by Fiorella Mannoia
"Come si cambia" (Neri per Caso featuring Noemi)	2010	Donne by Neri per Caso
"Cambiare"	2012	Il senso... di Alex by Various Artists
"Il cielo toccherò" (Noemi & Cast of Brave)	2012	Ribelle (The Brave) – Musica strumentale originale by Various Artists
"Tra vento e aria" (Noemi & Cast of Brave)	2012	Ribelle (The Brave) – Musica strumentale originale by Various Artists
"Se t'amo o no" (Syria featuring Noemi)	2017	Io+Io
"Una spada per Lady Oscar" (Cristina D'Avena featuring Noemi)	2017	Duets – Tutti cantano Cristina
"Una rosa a Lambrate" (M¥SS KETA featuring Noemi)	2022	Club Topperia
"A modo mio" (Paola & Chiara featuring Noemi)	2023	Per sempre
"Tabasco" (Carl Brave featuring Noemi)	2023	Migrazione
"A parte te" (Gianni Bismark featuring Noemi)	2023	Andata e ritorno
"C'era un ragazzo che come me" (Gianni Morandi featuring Alessandra Amoroso, Ariete, Bresh, Gaia, Gigi D'Alessio, J-Ax, Jovanotti, Marco Morandi, Naska, Noemi, Paola & Chiara, Tommaso Paradiso and Tredici Pietro)	2024	L'attrazione
"Gran rumore" (Mara Sattei featuring Noemi)	2026	Che me ne faccio del tempo
"Che caldo fa a Testaccio" (Willie Peyote featuring Noemi)	2026	Anatomia di uno schianto prolungato

== Music videos ==
List of music videos, showing year released and director
Title	Year	Director(s)
"Briciole"	2009	Gaetano Morbioli
"L'amore si odia"	2009	Gaetano Morbioli
"Per tutta la vita"	2010	Gaetano Morbioli
"Vuoto a perdere"	2011	Fausto Brizzi
"Odio tutti i cantanti"	2011	Noemi
"Poi inventi il modo"	2011	Noemi
"Sono solo parole"	2012	Noemi, Sebastiano Bontempi
"In un giorno qualunque"	2012	Noemi
"La promessa" (with Stadio)	2012	Gaetano Morbioli
"Se non è amore"	2012	Noemi
"Bagnati dal sole"	2014	Cosimo Alemà
"Don't Get Me Wrong"	2014	Mauro Russo
"L'amore eternit" (with Fedez)	2016	Mauro Russo
"La borsa di una donna"	2016	Mauro Russo

Guest appearance

- 2006 – "Dimmi come passi le notti" by Pier Cortese (with her sister Arianna)
