= Carl Brave discography =

Discography of Italian singer-songwriter, rapper and record producer Carl Brave

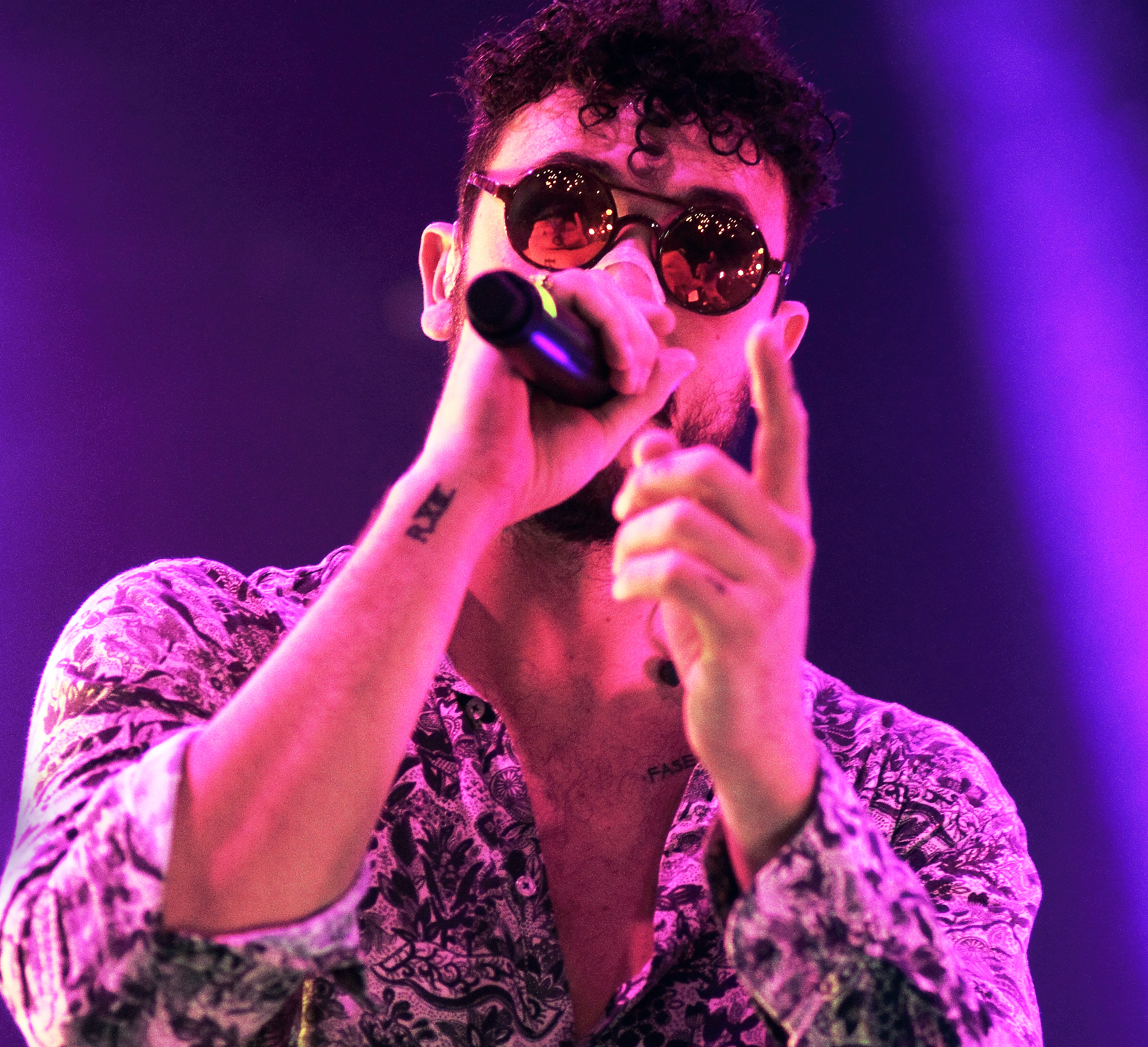
- Carl Brave in 2016
- Studio albums: 4
- EPs: 3
- Singles: 29

The discography of Italian singer-songwriter, rapper and record producer Carl Brave consists of four studio albums, three EPs and twenty-nine singles.

== Albums ==
=== Studio albums ===
Title	Album details	Peak chart positions	Certifications
Title	Album details	ITA	Certifications
Notti brave	Released: 11 May 2018; Label: Universal; Formats: CD, LP, digital download, streaming	1	FIMI: 2× Platinum
Coraggio	Released: 9 October 2020; Label: Universal; Formats: CD, LP, digital download, streming	2	FIMI: Platinum
Migrazione	Released: 9 June 2023; Label: Columbia, Universal; Formats: CD, LP, digital download, streaming	22	
Notti brave amarcord	Released: 25 April 2025; Label: Warner Music Italy; Formats: CD, LP, digital download, streaming	28	

=== Collaborative albums ===
List of studio collaborative albums with album details
Title	Album details	Peak chart positions	Certifications
Title	Album details	ITA	Certifications
Polaroid	Artists: Carl Brave, Franco126; Released: 5 May 2017; Label: Universal, Bomba Dischi; Formats: CD, digital download, streaming	6	FIMI: 2× Platinum

== Extended plays ==
List of EPs with details
Title	EP details	Peak chart positions	Certifications
Title	EP details	ITA	Certifications
Notti brave (After)	Released: 30 November 2018; Label: Island, Universal; Formats: CD, digital download, streaming	10	FIMI: Platinum
Sotto cassa	Released: 20 September 2021; Label: Island, Universal; Formati: digital download, streaming	98	
Mozziconi	Released: 27 February 2026; Label: Warner Records Italy, Warner Music Italy; Formati: digital download, streaming	—	
"—" denotes EP that did not chart or were not released.

== Singles ==
=== As lead artist ===
List of singles as lead artist, with selected chart positions, showing year released and album name
Title	Year	Peak positions	Certifications	Album or EP
Title	Year	ITA	Certifications	Album or EP
"Non importa" (with Franco126)	2016	—		Polaroid
"Santo Graal" (with Franco126)	2016	—		Polaroid
"E10" (with Franco126)	2016	—		Polaroid
"Fotografia" (featuring Francesca Michielin and Fabri Fibra)	2018	6	FIMI: 3× Platinum	Notti brave
"Posso" (featuring Max Gazzè)	2018	13	FIMI: 2× Platinum	Notti brave
"Merci"	2019	39	FIMI: Platinum	Notti brave
"Non ci sto" (with Shablo and Marracash)	2019	7	FIMI: Platinum	Non-album single
"Che poi"	2020	8	FIMI: Platinum	Coraggio
"Regina Coeli"	2020	30	FIMI: Gold	Coraggio
"Spigoli" (with Mara Sattei and Tha Supreme)	2020	1	FIMI: 3× Platinum	Coraggio
"Fratellì"	2020	—		Coraggio
"Parli parli" (featuring Elodie)	2020	34	FIMI: Platinum	Coraggio
"Makumba" (with Noemi)	2021	4	FIMI: 3× Platinum	Metamorfosi
"Matrimonio Gipsy" (featuring Myss Keta and Speranza)	2021	—		Sotto cassa
"La svolta"	2022	—		Non-album singles
"Insulti"	2022	—		Non-album singles
"Cristo di Rio" (with Max Gazzè)	2022	—		Non-album singles
"Hula-hoop" (with Noemi)	2022	35	FIMI: Platinum	Non-album singles
"Remember"	2023	—		Migrazione
"Lieto fine"	2023	—		Migrazione
"Morto a galla"	2025	—		Notti brave amarcord
"Perfect" (featuring Sarah Toscano)	2025	62		Notti brave amarcord
"Occhiaie"	2025	—		Non-album single
"—" denotes singles that did not chart or were not released.

=== As featured artist ===
List of singles, with chart positions, album name and certifications
Song	Year	Peak positions	Certifications	Album
Song	Year	ITA	Certifications	Album
"Vivere tutte le vite" (Elisa featuring Carl Brave)	2019	22	FIMI: 2× Platinum	Diari aperti
"Marionette" (Random featuring Carl Brave)	2020	52		Montagne russe
"Un'altra brasca" (DJ Gengis featuring Gemello and Carl Brave)	2020	—		Beat Coin
"Regole" (Lil Jolie featuring Carl Brave)	2021	—		Bambina
"Di notte" (Ernia featuring Carl Brave and Sfera Ebbasta)	2021	17	FIMI: Platinum	Gemelli (ascendente Milano)
"Amore disonesto" (Big Fish featuring Jake La Furia and Carl Brave)	2026	—		Non-album single
"—" denotes singles that did not chart or were not released.

== Other charted songs ==
List of other charted songs, with selected chart positions, showing year released and album name
Title	Year	Peak positions	Certifications	Album
Title	Year	ITA	Certifications	Album
"Professoré"	2018	41		Notti brave
"Vita"	2018	28	FIMI: Platinum	Notti brave
"Pub Crawl"	2018	44	FIMI:Gold	Notti brave
"Piano Noisy"	2018	74		Notti brave
"Noi"	2018	32	FIMI Gold	Notti brave
"La cuenta" (featuring Franco126)	2018	43		Notti brave
"E10" (featuring Pretty Solero and B)	2018	57		Notti brave
"Bretelle" (featuring Emis Killa)	2018	45		Notti brave
"Scusa" (featuring Ugo Borghetti & B)	2018	72		Notti brave
"Malibu" (featuring Gemitaiz)	2018	11	ITA: Platinum	Notti brave
"Parco Gondar" (featuring Coez)	2018	21	FIMI: Gold	Notti brave
"Camel blu" (featuring Giorgio Poi)	2018	22	FIMI: Platinum	Notti brave
"Chapeau" (featuring Frah Quintale)	2018	13	FIMI: Platinum	Notti brave
"Comunque"	2018	60		Notti brave (After)
"Mezzo cocktail" (featuring Ugo Borghetti)	2018	75		Notti brave (After)
"Spunte blu" (featuring Gué Pequeno)	2018	21	FIMI: Gold	Notti brave (After)
"Ridere di noi" (featuring Luchè)	2018	44	FIMI: Gold	Notti brave (After)
"Eccaallà"	2020	78		Coraggio
"Shangai"	2020	41	FIMI: Gold	Coraggio
"Gemelli"	2020	97		Coraggio

== Guest appearances ==
List of non-single appearances on compilation albums or other artists albums, with album name
Title	Year	Peak positions	Certifications	Album
Title	Year	ITA	Certifications	Album
"Canadair" (Ketama126 featuring Carl Brave)	2017	—		Oh Madonna
"Senza cuore & senza nome" (Emis Killa featuring Carl Brave)	2018	27		Supereroe
"Codice Pin" (Gemitaiz feat. Carl Brave)	2018	—		QVC8
"Impressione" (Rkomi featuring Carl Brave)	2019	21		Dove gli occhi non arrivano
"Star Trek" (Francesca Michielin featuring Carl Brave)	2020	—		Feat (stato di natura)
"Parte di me" (Gué Pequeno featuring Carl Brave)	2020	—	FIMI: Gold	Mr. Fini
"Neve" (Vale Lambo featuring Carl Brave)	2020	—		Come il mare
"Rollercoaster" (Gemitaiz featuring Carl Brave)	2020	—		QVC9
"Sogni lucidi" (Mace feat. Carl Brave and Rosa Chemical)	2021	33		OBE
"Bugie" (Madame featuring Rkomi and Carl Brave)	2021	15	FIMI: Platinum	Madame
"Cielo nero" (Random featuring Carl Brave and Samurai Jay)	2021	—		Nuvole
"Crisalide" (Beba featuring Carl Brave)	2021	—		Crisalide
"Caffelatte" (Rocco Hunt featuring Carl Brave)	2021	—		Rivoluzione
"Mosaici" (Sick Luke featuring Gaia and Carl Brave)	2022	—		X2
"Tetris" (Mara Sattei featuring Carl Brave)	2022	—		Universo
"La grande bellezza" (Il Pagante featuring Carl Brave)	2022	—		Devastante
"Risalirai" (Gemello featuring Carl Brave)	2022	—		La quiete
"Bugia" (Ski & Wok featuring Carl Brave)	2022	—		Rockstar 99, pt. 2
"Sparando alla luna" (Ketama126 featuring Carl Brave and Pretty Solero)	2022	—		Armageddon
"Marmellata" (The Night Skinny featuring Rkomi, Pyrex, VillaBanks and Carl Brave)	2022	44	FIMI: Gold	Botox
"Rehab" (Rose Villain featuring Carl Brave)	2023	—		Radio Gotham
"Bosco verticale" (Noemi featuring Carl Brave)	2025	—		Nostalgia
"Antenne" (Chicoria featuring Carl Brave and Side Baby)	2025	—		Due lettere dopo
"—" denotes songs that did not chart or were not released.
