= Se t'innamori muori =

Single by Noemi

from the album Nostalgia
- Released: 12 February 2025
- Genre: Pop
- Length: 3:10
- Label: Sony; Columbia
- Songwriters: Alessandro Mahmoud; Riccardo Fabbriconi; Michele Zocca
- Producer: Michelangelo

Noemi singles chronology
"Non ho bisogno di te" (2024)	"Se t'innamori muori" (2025)	"Non sono io" (2025)

Music video
- "Se t'innamori muori" on YouTube

"Se t'innamori muori" ("If you fall in love, you die") is a song recorded by Italian singer Noemi. It was released on 12 February 2025 through Columbia Records and Sony Music Italy as the lead single from her seventh studio album, Nostalgia.

The song competed during the Sanremo Music Festival 2025, finishing in thirteenth position. It marked the singer's eight participation on the contest, previously participating with "Ti amo non lo so dire" in 2022.

== Background and composition ==
Following the publication of her sixth studio album Metamorfosi in 2021 and participation in two Sanremo Festivals with the songs "Glicine" (2021) and "Ti amo non lo so dire" (2022), Noemi took a recording hiatus. In 2024, she released the single "Non ho bisogno di te" and announced that she was working on a new recording project.

The song, written by Mahmood, Blanco and Michele Zocca, in art Michelangelo, was described by the singer in a press conference:

"This song was born on my voice and I am happy. [...] The theme of If you fall in love you die is a very strong theme, apart from this line which is crazy being a metaphor to tell about abandonment, when we throw ourselves and live the feelings without being afraid, or maybe with that fear of feeling fragile, this is an abandonment, because actually it's all in someone else's hands. Although in the end there is this serenely resolving in the end, when you have given everything and you have nothing to recriminate. So it seems to me very very brave, the piece like the title."

== Critical reception ==
"Se t'innamori muori" received general positive reviews from music critics.

Andrea Laffranchi of Corriere della Sera wrote that the sonorities of the melody "wears the classicity of the orchestra with a few twists offered by the award-winning Mahmood-Blanco firm", while the singer "enters with the scratch and power inside the folds of a falling in love that can have both tragic and serenity". Gianni Sibilla of Rockol, although he did not appreciate listening to it without the live orchestra, he says it "enhances the beautiful voice, which scratches when it rises" of Noemi. Filippo Ferrari of Rolling Stone Italia reported that the song is in line with the singer's previous productions, associating it with a possible soundtrack for a Ferzan Özpetek film.

== Music video ==
The video for the song was released on 12 February 2025 on the singer's official YouTube channel. The video was directed by Federico Mazzarisi.

== Charts ==
=== Weekly charts ===
Chart performance for "Se t'innamori muori"
Chart (2025)	Peak position
Italy (FIMI)	19
Italy Airplay (EarOne)	13

=== Year-end charts ===
Year-end chart performance for "Se t'innamori muori"
Chart (2025)	Position
Italy (FIMI)	63

== Certifications ==
Region	Certification	Certified units/sales
Italy (FIMI)	Gold	100,000^{‡}
^{‡} Sales+streaming figures based on certification alone.
