= Nostalgia (Noemi album) =

Studio album by Noemi
- Released: 28 February 2025
- Genre: R&B; pop; blues
- Length: 26:34
- Language: Italian
- Label: Columbia; Sony Music
- Producer: Carl Brave; Dav; Drillionaire; Taketo Gohara; Katoo; Michelangelo; Edwyn Roberts; Golden Years; Vvenice

Noemi chronology
Metamorfosi (2021)	Nostalgia (2025)

Singles from Nostalgia
- 1. "Se t'innamori muori" Released: 12 February 2025; 2. "Non sono io" Released: 2 May 2025

Nostalgia is the seventh studio album by Italian singer Noemi, released on 28 February 2025 by Columbia and Sony Music.

The album was promoted by the single Se t'innamori muori, which competed at the Sanremo Music Festival 2025, finishing in thirteen position.

== Background and composition ==
After the publication of her sixth studio album Metamorfosi in 2021 and her participation in two Sanremo Festivals with the songs "Glicine" (2021) and "Ti amo non lo so dire" (2022), Noemi took a recording hiatus. In 2024, she released the single "Non ho bisogno di te" and announced that she was working on a new record project.

The record project consists of nine tracks, three of which were written by the singer herself, with the songwriting collaboration of Mahmood, Blanco, Giorgio Poi, Davide Simonetta, Dimartino and Edwyn Roberts; the album features three collaborations with Neffa, Carl Brave and Tony Effe, the latter reinterpreting the song "Tutto il resto è noia" by Franco Califano.

== Critical reception ==
Mattia Marzi of Rockol reported that the singer embraced new sounds, which "intertwined the blues of her early days with Crumbs, contemporary songwriting and electronic influences", finding them to be well accomplished with the contemporary R&B style of the tracks written by Mahmood and Ginevra. Marzi described the tracks "Notte inutile" and "La fine" as those in which the artist is most centered, also finding the collaboration with Carl Brave "with definitely less jaunty atmospheres than the summer catchphrases" previously released by the duo, while the collaboration with Tony Effe "artistically forced".

Francesco Lo Torto of Vanity Fair Italia wrote that the feeling of nostalgia, which gives the album its title, is for the singer "therapeutic and consoling", defining it "a sentimental work" in which she "mixes classic songs, [...], to more modern tracks, which also give hospitality to electronic sounds". The journalist also stated that "the artist's rough and personal timbre is the perfect medium for traversing vulnerability".

== Track listing ==
Nostalgia track listing
No.	Title	Lyrics	Music	Producer(s)	Length
1.	"Se t'innamori muori"	Alessandro Mahmoud; Riccardo Fabbriconi	Mahmoud; Fabbriconi; Michele Zocca	Michelangelo	3:10
2.	"Tutto il resto è noia" (featuring Tony Effe)	Franco Califano	Francesco Del Giudice; Enzo Campagnoli	Drillionaire	2:21
3.	"La fine"	Antonio Di Martino; Jacopo Ettorre	Di Martino; Ettorre; Francesco Catitti	Katoo	2:10
4.	"Nostalgia" (featuring Neffa)	Giovanni Pellino	Pellino; Taketo Gohara	Gohara	3:04
5.	"Centomila notti"	Veronica Scopelliti; Ginevra Lubrano; Riccardo Schiara	Lubrano; Schiara; Davide Simonetta	Dav; Vvenice	3:19
6.	"Luna bugiarda"	Stefano Marletta; Edwyn Roberts	Roberts; Zocca	Roberts; Michelangelo	3:08
7.	"Notte inutile"	Scopelliti; Giorgio Poti; Pietro Paroletti	Paroletti	Golden Years	2:57
8.	"Bosco verticale" (featuring Carl Brave)	Scopelliti; Carlo Luigi Coraggio	Coraggio	Carl Brave	3:12
9.	"Parolaccia"	Alessandro Raina; Paolo Antonacci; Schiara	Raina; Antonacci; Schiara; Simonetta; Catitti	Katoo	3:05
Total length:					26:34

Streaming bonus track edition
No.	Title	Lyrics	Music	Producer(s)	Length
1.	"Non sono io"	Alessandro La Cava; Riccardo Zanotti	La Cava; Zanotti; Stefano Tognini	MadFingerz; Paga	2:52
Total length:					29:26

== Charts ==
Chart performance for Nostalgia
Chart (2025)	Peak position
Italian Albums (FIMI)	7
