= Hula-hoop (song) =

Single by Carl Brave and Noemi
- Released: 24 June 2022
- Genre: Indie pop
- Length: 3:34
- Label: Sony Music
- Songwriter: Carlo Luigi Coraggio
- Producer: Carl Brave

Carl Brave singles chronology
"Cristo di Rio" (2022)	"Hula-hoop" (2022)	"Remember" (2023)

Noemi singles chronology
"Ti amo non lo so dire" (2022)	"Hula-hoop" (2022)	"Fuori dai guai" (2022)

Music video
- "Hula-hoop" on YouTube

"Hula-hoop" is a song by Italian singers Carl Brave and Noemi. It was released on 24 June 2022 through Sony Music Italy.

== Background and composition ==
Written and produced by Carl Brave, the song marks the second collaboration with Noemi after "Makumba", which was included in the singer's digital and streaming re-release of her album Metamorfosi. Noemi explained the decision to collaborate again:

"In this past year, Carlo and I have formed a sincere relationship of artistic esteem and have become friends. It was natural for me to respond to his proposal to return to the studio. I think this great affinity and the fun we have when we are together is also evident from this new track. From the first guitar chords, you can tell it is our own piece. "Hula-hoop" has a sound that now sets us apart, hovering between the brightness of summer and the sophistication of certain sounds, like that of the marimba or guitars, that taste like summer. It was very nice to find ourselves in music as well."

Interviewed by Andrea Laffranchi of Corriere della Sera, Carl Brave said that the song echoes the sounds of Claudia Mori's song "Non succederà più".

== Critic reception ==
Silvia Gianatti, reviewing the song for Vanity Fair Italia, reported that the collaboration reflects the personalities of the two artists, namely the "lightness that is mixed with a gaze that they share and that focuses on small things. [...] Affinity resonates between the notes, between irony and romance, talking about life, its difficulties." Giulia Ciavarelli of TV Sorrisi e Canzoni described the collaboration as "an engaging alchemy and complicity" with "a light and catchy style".

Alberto Muraro of All Music Italia described "Hula-Hoop" as a song with "both an ironic and romantic flavor" in which it "speaks of the metaphor of life, which with its difficulties keeps us all as in balance". For the same publication, Fabio Fiume found "similarities with last year's "Makumba", in a 1960s key" and that "the aside is not pushed to the power level, but arranged in a lifted way".

== Music video ==
The music video for the song, directed by Simone Rovellini, was released on June 29, 2022, through the Carl Brave's YouTube channel.

== Charts ==
Weekly chart performance for "Hula-hoop"
Chart (2022)	Peak position
Italy (FIMI)	35
Italy Airplay (EarOne)	6
San Marino (SMRRTV Top 50)	11

== Certifications ==
Region	Certification	Certified units/sales
Italy (FIMI)	Platinum	100,000^{‡}
^{‡} Sales+streaming figures based on certification alone.
