= Sono solo parole =

Single by Noemi

from the album RossoNoemi
- Language: Italian
- Released: 15 February 2012
- Genre: Pop soul; power ballad
- Length: 3:37
- Label: Sony Music
- Songwriter: Fabrizio Moro
- Producer: Corrado Rustici

Noemi singles chronology
"Poi inventi il modo" (2011)	"Sono solo parole" (2012)	"La promessa" (2012)

Music video
- "Sono solo parole" on YouTube

"Sono solo parole" (transl. "They're just words") is a song recorded by Italian singer Noemi. It was released through Sony Music on 15 February 2012 as the lead single from the deluxe re-edition of her second studio album RossoNoemi.

The song, written by Fabrizio Moro and produced by Corrado Rustici, competed at the Sanremo Music Festival 2012, marking the singer's second participation in the contest and placing third in the final ranking.

== Background and composition ==
After the participation of both Noemi and Fabrizio Moro at the Sanremo Music Festival 2010, respectively with tracks "Per tutta la vita" and "Non è una canzone", Moro wrote the song "Sono solo parole" with arrangements and production by Corrado Rustici. Noemi explained the meaning of the song and the decision to sing it:

"It tells the story of a relationship between two people that spreads throughout society. And then it was a double challenge because Fabrizio wrote this song for himself. I listened to it and went on a personal journey to find the right way to interpret it. Then there are a lot of words and the melody is strong. It's a slightly different style from my musical past."

== Critical reception ==
Andrea Scanzi of Il Fatto Quotidiano wrote that the song "starts slowly, then explodes like an army of hostile mines" with "the singer's rusty voice, which is her trademark and perhaps her downfall."

== Music video ==
The music video for the song was directed by Noemi herself with Sebastiano Bontempi, and was released in conjunction with the single's release.

== Charts ==
=== Weekly charts ===
Chart performance for "Sono solo parole"
Chart (2012)	Peak position
Italy (FIMI)	3
Italy (EarOne Airplay)	5

=== Year-end charts ===
Chart performance for "Sono solo parole"
Chart (2012)	Position
Italy (FIMI)	25

== Certifications ==
Certifications for "Sono solo parole"
Region	Certification	Certified units/sales
Italy (FIMI)	2× Platinum	60,000^{‡}
^{‡} Sales+streaming figures based on certification alone.
