= La luna (Noemi album) =

Studio album by Noemi
- Released: 9 February 2018
- Genre: Pop; blues
- Length: 44:32
- Language: Italian
- Label: Sony Music
- Producer: Diego Calvetti

Noemi chronology
Cuore d'artista (2016)	La luna (2018)	Metamorfosi (2021)

Singles from La luna
- 1. "Autunno" Released: 8 September 2017; 2. "I miei rimedi" Released: 1 December 2017; 3. "Non smettere mai di cercarmi" Released: 6 February 2018; 4. "Porcellana" Released: 13 April 2018

La luna is the fifth studio album by Italian singer Noemi, released on 9 February 2018 by Sony Music and produced by Diego Calvetti.

The album was preceded by the singles "Autunno", released in September 2017 and written by Thegiornalisti's frontman Tommaso Paradiso and Dario Faini, and "I miei rimedi", a reworked version of a song previously recorded by Italian band La Rua, released in December 2017. La luna was launched during the 68th Sanremo Music Festival, in which Noemi competed with the album's third single, "Non smettere mai di cercarmi", placing 14th. An additional single, "Porcellana", was released in April 2018. Tricarico, Giuseppe Anastasi and Diego Calvetti also appear as songwriters on the tracks of La luna. The album also features a cover of the song "Domani" by singer-songwriter Lucio Dalla.

The sound of La luna combines Noemi's traditional style—mainly inspired by Italian cantautori and blues—with electronic influences, previously explored in her album Made in London.

To promote the album, Noemi also performed live across Italy for her La luna tour, which started in May 2018. In 2019, La luna received a Lunezia Award in the section Stil Novo Award.

== Track listing ==
No.	Title	Lyrics	Music	Length
1.	"Non smettere mai di cercarmi"	Veronica Scopellitti; Massimiliano Pelan; Fabio De Martino	Scopelliti; Pelan; De Martin; Diego Calvetti	3:09
2.	"Porcellana"	Emiliano Cecere	Cecere; Calvetti	3:08
3.	"Autunno"	Tommaso Paradiso	Paradiso; Dario Faini	3:10
4.	"L'attrazione"	Giuseppe Anastasi	Anastasi	3:00
5.	"Oggi non esisto per nessuno"	Gerardo Pulli	Piero Romitelli; Gaetano Curreri	3:10
6.	"Un giorno eccezionale"	Cecere; Marco Rettani; Diego Calvetti	Cecere; Calvetti; Nicola Marotta	3:34
7.	"I miei rimedi"	Daniele Incicco; Roberto Casalino; Faini	Incicco; Casalino; Faini	3:40
8.	"Love Goodbye"	Scopelliti; Calvetti; Rettani	Calvetti	2:56
9.	"Bye Bye"	Niccolò Verrienti; Giulia Capone; Alessandra Flora	Verrienti; Capone; Flora	3:18
10.	"Sei la mia vita"	Scopelliti; Calvetti; Rettani	Scopelliti; Cecere	3:13
11.	"La luna storta"	Scopelliti; Francesco Tricarico	Tricarico	4:05
12.	"My Good Bad and Ugly"	Scopelliti; Penny Elizabeth Foster; Mattheos Herbert Weedon	Scopelliti; Foster; Weedon	4:06
13.	"Domani" (Lucio Dalla cover)	Lucio Dalla	Bruno Incarnato	4:03

== Charts ==
Chart (2018)	Peak position
Italian Albums (FIMI)	13
