= Sulla mia pelle =

2009 album by Noemi

Studio album by Noemi
- Released: October 2, 2009
- Recorded: 2009, Platinum Studio
- Genre: Pop rock; soul
- Length: 38 : 36
- Label: Sony Music
- Producer: Diego Calvetti

Noemi chronology
Noemi (2009)	Sulla mia pelle (2009)	RossoNoemi (2011)

Singles from Sulla mia pelle
- 1. "L'amore si odia" Released: September 10, 2009

Sulla mia pelle is the debut studio album by Italian singer Noemi, released on October 2, 2009. The album was certified double platinum by the Federation of the Italian Music Industry.

== Track listing ==
Sulla mia pelle – Standard edition
No.	Title	Lyrics	Music	Length
1.	"All'infinito"	Marco Ciappelli; Daniele Coro	Diego Calvetti	3:39
2.	"L'amore si odia" (with Fiorella Mannoia)	Calvetti; Ciappelli	Calvetti	3:12
3.	"Non so amare di più"	Calvetti; Ciappelli	Sergio Vinci; Calvetti	3:41
4.	"Tutto questo scorre"	Giulio Calvino; Sergio Maggioni	Calvino; Maggioni	3:07
5.	"I sentimenti"	Calvetti; Ciappelli	Calvetti	4:33
6.	"Comunque ti penso"	Emiliano Cecere; Calvetti; Ciappelli	Cecere; Calvetti; Ciappelli	3:20
7.	"Petrolio"	Calvetti; Ciappelli	Lele Fontana; Francesco Sighieri	3:09
8.	"L’addio (il giorno più grande)"	Pio Stafanini	Stefanini	3:22
9.	"Per colpa tua"	Francesco Bianconi	Bianconi	3:46
10.	"Sulla mia pelle"	Veronica Scopelliti	Scopelliti	3:38

Sulla mia pelle – iTunes download bonus track
No.	Title	Lyrics	Music	Length
11.	"L'amore si odia" (solo version)	Calvetti; Ciappelli	Calvetti	3:09

== Sulla mia pelle Tour (first leg) ==
Sulla mia pelle tour (prima parte)
- Tour by Noemi
- Location: Italy
- Associated album: Sulla mia pelle
- Start date: October 23, 2009
- End date: January 16, 2010
- No. of shows: 22

Noemi concert chronology
- Noemi tour; Sulla mia pelle tour (prima parte); Sulla mia pelle tour (seconda parte)

Sulla mia pelle tour (prima parte) started on October 23, 2009 in Taneto di Gattatico and finished on January 16, 2010 in Sedico. The tour finished in this date because on February Noemi would participate in the sixtieth edition of the Sanremo Music Festival with the song "Per tutta la vita". Tour was formed by 22 shows.

Band

- Emanuele (Lele) Fontana (keyboard and hammond)
- Donald Renda (drum and cajón)
- Davide Ferrario (guitar)
- Ronny Aglietti (bass)

Tour

Sulla mia pelle tour (prima parte)
Year	Month	Day	Stage tour
2009	October	23	Taneto di Gattatico (RE) – Fuori Orario (Circolo Arci)
2009	November	6	Piangipane (RA) – Socjale Theater (Circolo Arci)
2009	November	8	Brescia – Seconda Classe
2009	November	20	Florence – Otel Varieté
2009	November	26	Rome – Alpheus (for "Data Zero" of Vodafone Zero Limits)
2009	November	28	Ponte San Pietro (LU) – HUB
2009	December	5	Levico Terme (TN) – Palalevico
2009	December	7	Putignano (BA) – Autodromo Club
2009	December	9	Ferrara – Nuovo Theater
2009	December	11	Modica (RG) – Garibaldi Theater
2009	December	17	Cremona – Monteverdi Theater
2009	December	18	Ancona – Neon Club
2009	December	19	Bassano del Grappa (VI) – Remondini Theater
2009	December	23	Lerici (SP) – Astoria Theater
2009	December	27	Montecatini Terme (PT) – Verdi Theater
2009	December	28	Forio d'Ischia (NA) – Notte Bianca
2009	December	30	Fondo (TN) – Palanaunia
2009	December	31	Andria (BT) – Place Catuma – show for New Year's Day
2009	December	31	Taranto – Place Della Vittoria – show for New Year's Day
2010	January	7	Cesena (FC) – Verdi Theater
2010	January	8	Lanusei (OG) – Tonio Dei Theater
2010	January	16	Sedico (BL) – Palasport

== Deluxe edition ==
Sulla mia pelle (Deluxe Edition)

Compilation album by Noemi
- Released: February 19, 2010
- Recorded: 2010, Platinum Studio
- Genre: Pop rock; soul
- Length: 50:45
- Label: Sony Music
- Producer: Diego Calvetti

Singles from Sulla mia pelle (Deluxe Edition)
- 1. "Per tutta la vita" Released: February 17, 2010; 2. "Vertigini" Released: May 14, 2010

The deluxe edition of Noemi's debut studio album Sulla mia pelle was released on 19 February 2010 by Sony Music.

=== Track listing ===
Sulla mia pelle – Deluxe edition bonus tracks
No.	Title	Lyrics	Music	Length
1.	"Per tutta la vita"	Calvetti; Ciappelli	Calvetti	3:14
12.	"Briciole"	Calvetti; Ciappelli	Sighieri	3:21
13.	"Vertigini" (New version)	Calvetti; Calò; Romanelli	Calvetti; Calò; Romanelli	3:56

Sulla mia pelle – iTunes exclusive bonus track
No.	Title	Lyrics	Music	Length
14.	"Briciole" (Live version)	Calvetti; Ciappelli	Sighieri	4:74

== Sulla mia pelle Tour (second leg) ==
Sulla mia pelle tour (seconda parte)
- Tour by Noemi
- Location: Italy Slovenia
- Associated album: Sulla mia pelle (Deluxe Edition)
- Start date: April 15, 2010
- End date: October 15, 2010
- No. of shows: 53

Noemi concert chronology
- Sulla mia pelle tour (prima parte); Sulla mia pelle tour (seconda parte)

Sulla mia pelle tour (seconda parte) started on April 15, 2010 to Campi Bisenzio and finished on October 15, 2010 in Orani. Tour was formed by 53 shows.

Band

- Emanuele (Lele) Fontana (keyboard and hammond)
- Claudio Storniolo (piano)
- Gabriele Greco (bass and double bass)
- Bernardo Baglioni (guitar)
- Donald Renda (drum and cajón)

=== Stage tour ===
Sulla mia pelle tour (seconda parte)*
Year	Month	Day	Stage tour
2010	April	15	Campi Bisenzio (FI) – opening Fnac (shopping center I Gigli)
2010	April	16	Senigallia (AN) – La Fenice Theater
2010	April	17	Rome – Piazza del Popolo (Roma capitale dello Sport)
2010	April	21	Turin – PalaIsozaki (opens concert of Tour Europe indoor of Vasco Rossi)
2010	April	22	Turin – PalaIsozaki (opens concert of Tour Europe indoor of Vasco Rossi)
2010	April	29	Rome – Foro Italico for Internazional of tennis
2010	April	30	Brescia – Notte Bianca to Loggia Place
2010	May	6	Melilli (SR) – San Sebastiano Place
2010	May	7	Grammichele (CT) – Carlo Maria Carafa Place
2010	May	16	Lesina (FG) – Place
2010	May	21	Laterza (TA) – Vittorio Emanuele Place
2010	May	31	Gravina in Puglia (BA) – Pellicciari Place
2010	June	1	Scafati (SA) – Notte Bianca
2010	June	4	Rende (CS) – Miracoli Place
2010	June	5	Maida (CZ) – Arena Centro Due Mari
2010	June	11	Bari – Fiera del Levante
2010	June	12	Castelfiorentino (FI) – Borgo storico
2010	June	17	Jesolo (VE) – Marina club
2010	June	21	Fasano (BR) – Ciaia Place
2010	June	22	Pignola (PZ) – sports ground
2010	June	24	Jesi (AN) – Show "Per tutta la vita"
2010	June	26	Turin – MTV Days
2010	June	29	Monza – Autodromo Nazionale di Monza (Special Olympics)
2010	July	2	Alia (PA) – Place
2010	July	3	Capo d'Orlando (ME) – Matteotti Place
2010	July	5	Pontedera (PI)
2010	July	9	Nova Gorica (Slovenia) – Casinò Perla
2010	July	15	Varallo (VC) – Show Alpaa
2010	July	16	Lucca – Lucca Summer Festival (opens act for Seal)
2010	July	17	Crotone – Meeting del mare
2010	July	18	Viterbo – Arena di Valle Faul
2010	July	20	Montecchio (TR)
2010	July	22	Sulcis (CI)
2010	July	23	Grugliasco (TO) – Gruvillage
2010	July	25	Teramo – Martiri della libertà Place
2010	July	27	La Spezia – with Patty Pravo
2010	July	29	Sommacampagna (VR) – sports ground
2010	July	30	Vernasca (PC) – Antica Pieve
2010	August	1	Castrovillari (CS) – Area mercatale Place
2010	August	4	Noventa di Piave (VE) – Veneto Designer Outlet
2010	August	5	Isola di Albarella (RO) – sports ground
2010	August	4	Melfi (PZ) – Place
2010	August	9	Cisternino (BR) – Roma Place
2010	August	11	Scoglitti, fraction of Vittoria (RG) – Place
2010	August	12	Partanna (TP) – Matteotti Place
2010	August	14	Cassino (FR) – Meraviglie Park
2010	August	16	Alezio (LE) – Place
2010	August	17	Santa Maria la Fossa (CE) – Place
2010	August	20	Assisi (PG) – Place
2010	August	23	Villaperuccio (CI) – Amphitheatre
2010	August	26	Rapallo (GE) – Festival "Palco sul mare"
2010	October	2	Varazze (SV) – Seafront
2010	October	15	Orani (NU) – Place

== Charts ==
=== Album ===
Album	Chart	Peak position
Sulla mia pelle	Italy Albums Chart FIMI	3
Sulla mia pelle (Deluxe Edition)	Italy Albums Chart FIMI	3
Sulla mia pelle	Europe Album Chart Billboard	44
Sulla mia pelle (Deluxe Edition)	Europe Album Chart Billboard	42

=== Singles ===
Single	Chart	Position
L'amore si odia	Italian Singles Chart	1
Per tutta la vita	ItaliansSingles Chart	1
Vertigini	Italian Singles Chart	
