= Vuoto a perdere =

Single by Noemi

from the album RossoNoemi
- Released: 28 January 2011
- Recorded: 2011 – Impatto s.r.l.
- Genre: Pop rock
- Length: 4:04
- Label: Sony Music
- Songwriters: Vasco Rossi; Gaetano Curreri
- Producer: Celso Valli

Noemi singles chronology
"Vertigini" (2010)	"Vuoto a perdere" (2011)	"Odio tutti i cantanti" (2011)

"Vuoto a perdere" (Italian pronunciation: [ˈvwɔːto a pˈpɛrdere]; lit. 'Empty [thing] to be lost') (Note: An expression designating empty containers that are disposed of in the waste rather than being returned, used as a metaphor for a person who feels useless and discarded.) is a song recorded by Italian singer Noemi. It was released on 28 January 2011 through Sony Music as the lead single from her second studio album RossoNoemi.

The song was written by Vasco Rossi and Gaetano Curreri and produced by Celso Valli.

== Music video ==
The music video for "Vuoto a perdere", starring Serena Autieri and Carla Signoris, was directed by Fausto Brizzi and is the first Noemi video to be filmed in 3-D. It was released on 29 January 2011 on the website of the Italian version of the magazine Vanity Fair.

== Soundtrack ==
"Vuoto a perdere" is included in the soundtrack of the sequel of the film Maschi contro femmine, titled Femmine contro maschi and directed by Fausto Brizzi.

== Personnel ==
- Noemi – vocals
- Celso Valli – producer, piano, keyboards, strings, strings direction, arrangement
- Massimo Varini – electric guitar, acoustic guitar
- Cesare Chiodo – bass
- Paolo Valli – drums
- Samuele Dessi – programming
- Celso Valli Ensemble Orchestra – strings

== Charts ==
Chart (2021)	Peak position
Italy (FIMI)	6
Italy Airplay (EarOne)	2
