= Vertigini =

Single by Noemi

from the album Sulla mia pelle (Deluxe Edition)
- Released: 14 May 2010
- Recorded: 2010 – Platinum Studio
- Genre: Soul; R&B
- Length: 3:36
- Label: Sony Music
- Songwriters: Massimiliano Calò; Giuseppe Romanelli; Diego Calvetti
- Producer: Diego Calvetti

Noemi singles chronology
"Per tutta la vita" (2010)	"Vertigini" (2010)	"Vuoto a perdere" (2011)

"Vertigini" (Italian for "Dizziness") is a song recorded by Italian singer Noemi. It was released on 14 May 2010 by Sony Music as the second single from the deluxe edition of the singer's debut studio album Sulla mia pelle.

== The song ==
The song, originally l released on 7 May 2010, was re-released on 14 May due to recording and release scheduling problems.

"Vertigini" was written by Massimiliano Calò, Giuseppe Romanelli and Diego Calvetti, and produced by the latter.

== Track listing ==
Digital download

No.	Title	Writer(s)	Length
1.	"Vertigini (Radio Edit)"	Massimiliano Calò, Giuseppe Romanelli, Diego Calvetti	3:36

== Other versions ==
"Vertigini" has two versions:

- "Vertigini" (length 3:21) contained in Noemi
- "Vertigini" (length 3:56) contained in Sulla mia pelle (Deluxe Edition)
