= Cuore d'artista =

Studio album by Noemi
- Released: 12 February 2016
- Genre: Pop; pop rock; soul
- Length: 34:02
- Language: Italian
- Label: Sony Music
- Producer: Celso Valli

Noemi chronology
Made in London (2014)	Cuore d'artista (2016)	La luna (2018)

Singles from Cuore d'artista
- 1. "La borsa di una donna" Released: 9 February 2016; 2. "Fammi respirare dai tuoi occhi" Released: 1 April 2016; 3. "Idealista!" Released: 10 June 2016; 4. "Amen" Released: 7 October 2016

Cuore d'artista is the fourth studio album by Italian singer Noemi, released on 12 February 2016 by Sony Music. The album was launched by the single "La borsa di una donna", co-written by Marco Masini and performed at the Sanremo Music Festival 2016, where it placed 8th in the Big Artists Section. Italian singer-songwriters Ivano Fossati, Giuliano Sangiorgi and Gaetano Curreri also penned other tracks featured on the album, while Noemi only co-wrote the track "I Love You".

Cuore d'artista also spawned the singles "Fammi respirare dai tuoi occhi", "Idealista!" and "Amen". Produced by Celso Valli, it marked Noemi's comeback to a more traditional—and sometimes vintage—sound, after the electronic-influenced album Made in London. According to Rockol's Mattia Marzi, its pop rock tracks are written with a cantautore approach, highlighting Noemi's skills as an interpreter, in the footprints of female artists such as Fiorella Mannoia, Mia Martini, Patty Pravo and Ornella Vanoni.

To promote the album, Noemi performed live across Italy for her Cuore d'artista Club tour.

== Track listing ==
No.	Title	Lyrics	Music	Length
1.	"La borsa di una donna"	Marco Masini; Antonio Iammarino; Marco Adami	Iammarino; Adami	3:50
2.	"Fammi respirare dai tuoi occhi"	Giuliano Sangiorgi	Sangiorgi	4:10
3.	"Amen"	Federica Abbate; Alfredo Rapetti	Abbate; Rapetti	3:54
4.	"Devi essere forte"	Gerardo Pulli; Gaetano Curreri	Pulli	3:55
5.	"Idealista!"	Ivano Fossati	Fossati	4:17
6.	"I Love You"	Veronica Scopelliti; Rapetti	Scopelliti	3:34
7.	"Mentre aspetto che ritorni"	Alessandra Flora	Flora	3:09
8.	"Devi soltanto esistere"	Alberto Pioppi	Gaetano Curreri; Andrea Fornili	3:16
9.	"Veronica guarda il mare"	Saverio Grandi	Curreri; Fabio Barnarba	3:57

== Charts ==
Chart (2016)	Peak position
Italian Albums (FIMI)	13
