= L'amore eternit =

Single by Fedez featuring Noemi

from the album Pop-Hoolista
- Language: Italian
- Released: 27 March 2015
- Genre: Pop rap
- Length: 4:18
- Label: Sony Music
- Songwriters: Federico Lucia; Alfredo Rapetti; Federica Abbate; Alessandro Merli; Fabio Clemente
- Producer: Takagi & Ketra

Fedez singles chronology
"Magnifico" (2014)	"L'amore eternit" (2015)	"Seven" (2015)

Noemi singles chronology
"Se tu fossi qui" (2014)	"L'amore eternit" (2014)	"La borsa di una donna" (2016)

Music video
- "L'amore è eternit" on YouTube

"L'amore eternit" (transl. "Eternit Love") is a song co-written and recorded by Italian rapper Fedez with featured vocals by Italian singer Noemi. It was released throungh Sony Music on 27 March 2015 as the third single from his fourth studio album Pop-Hoolista.

== Composition ==
The song, written by the rapper himself with Cheope, Federica Abbate and produced by Takagi & Ketra, features vocals by Italian singer Noemi . The song draws parallels between love and eternit, referring to the trial against Stephan Schmidheiny for damage to the health of Italian workers in factories owned by the entrepreneur.

== Music video ==
The music video, directed by Mauro Russo and produced by Oblivion Production and Calibro9, was released on 7 April 2015 on the rapper's YouTube channel on April 7, 2015. It was filmed in San Pietro Vernotico in the Province of Brindisi.

== Charts ==
=== Weekly charts ===
Chart performance for "L'amore eternit"
Chart (2015)	Peak position
Italy (FIMI)	6
Italy (EarOne Airplay)	14

=== Year-end charts ===
Chart performance for "L'amore eternit"
Chart (2015)	Position
Italy (FIMI)	20

== Certifications ==
Certifications for "L'amore eternit"
Region	Certification	Certified units/sales
Italy (FIMI)	3× Platinum	150,000^{‡}
^{‡} Sales+streaming figures based on certification alone.
