= L'amore si odia =

2009 single by Noemi and Fiorella Mannoia

Single by Noemi featuring Fiorella Mannoia

from the album Sulla mia pelle
- Released: 10 April 2009
- Recorded: 2009
- Studio: Platinum
- Genre: Soul; R&B
- Length: 3:21
- Label: Sony Music
- Songwriters: Diego Calvetti; Marco Ciappelli
- Producer: Diego Calvetti

Noemi singles chronology
"Briciole" (2009)	"L'amore si odia" (2009)	"Per tutta la vita" (2010)

Fiorella Mannoia singles chronology
"Il re di chi ama troppo" (2009)	"L'amore si odia" (2009)	"Ho imparato a sognare" (2009)

"L'amore si odia" (Italian for "Love is to be hated") is a duet recorded by Italian singers Noemi and Fiorella Mannoia. It was released on 10 September 2009 as the lead single from Noemi's debut studio album Sulla mia pelle and it was later included in Mannoia's compilation Ho imparato a sognare.

== The song ==
"L'amore si odia" was written by Diego Calvetti and Marco Ciappelli and produced by Diego Calvetti. On 24 May 2010, Noemi and Mannoia got one Wind Music Award for sales of this song, which also obtained a double platinum disc.

== Track listing ==
Digital download

No.	Title	Lyrics	Music	Length
1.	"L'amore si odia"	Diego Calvetti, Marco Ciappelli	Diego Calvetti	3:21

== Music video ==
The music video for "L'amore si odia" was produced by Gaetano Morbioli.

== Charts ==
Chart (2009)	Peak position
Italian FIMI Singles Chart	1

=== Year-end charts ===
Chart (2009)	Position
Italian Singles Chart	6

Chart (2010)	Position
Italian Singles Chart	72

== Cover versions ==
In 2009, Marco Mengoni, the winner of the 3rd season of the Italian version of X Factor performed the song during the second live show. The song was later included in his debut EP, Dove si vola.
