= Noemi (EP) =

EP by Noemi
- Released: April 24, 2009
- Recorded: 2009
- Studio: Platinum Studio
- Genre: Soul; R&B
- Length: 20:22
- Label: Sony Music
- Producer: Diego Calvetti

Noemi chronology
Noemi (2009)	Sulla mia pelle (2009)

Singles from Noemi
- 1. "Briciole" Released: April 10, 2009

Noemi is the debut EP by Italian singer Noemi. It was released on 24 April 2009 by Sony Music. The record includes Noemi's debut single "Briciole", among with two cover songs and three original songs. The EP was certified gold with more than 50,000 copies sold.

== Track listing ==
Noemi track listing
No.	Title	Lyrics	Music	Length
1.	"Briciole"	Marco Ciappelli; Diego Calvetti	Francesco Sighieri	3:21
2.	"Stelle appiccicate"	Ciappelli; Calvetti; Luca Chiaravalli; Stefaan Fernande; Lissette Alea	Ciappelli; Calvetti; Chiaravalli; Fernande; Alea	3:44
3.	"Vertigini"	Calvetti; Massimiliano Calò; Giuseppe Romanelli	Calvetti; Calò; Romanelli	3:21
4.	"Credo a ciò che vedo"	Ciappelli; Calvetti	Sighieri	3:34
5.	"Il cielo in una stanza"	Gino Paoli	Paoli	3:34
6.	"Albachiara"	Vasco Rossi; Alan Taylor	Rossi	2:47

== Charts ==
=== Album ===
Chart	Peak position
Italy Albums Chart FIMI	8
Europe Album Chart (Billboard)	97

=== Singles ===
Single	Chart	Position
"Briciole"	Italians Singles Chart	2

== Noemi tour ==
Noemi tour
- Tour by Noemi
- Location: Italy
- Associated album: Noemi
- Start date: May 15, 2009
- End date: August 29, 2009
- No. of shows: 21

Noemi concert chronology
- /; Noemi tour; Sulla mia pelle tour (prima parte)

Band

- Emanuele (Lele) Fontana (keyboard)
- Donald Renda (drum)
- Giacomo Castellano (guitar)
- Ronny Aglietti (bass)

Tour

Year	Month	Day	Stage tour
2009	May	15	Rome - Foro Italico (for beach volley worldwide)
2009	May	16	Milan - Teatro degli Arcimboldi (opens concert of Simply Red)
2009	May	17	Milan - Parco Lambro (25 years of Exodus)
2009	May	21	Milan - Gallop's hippodrome of San Siro (MotionFlow contest)
2009	May	22	Apricena (FG) - Plaze Costa
2009	May	29	Arezzo - Sugar Reef Musicology
2009	June	7	Antegnate (BG) - shopping center
2009	June	13	Lonato del Garda (BS) - Big Mama's
2009	June	20	Foligno (PG) - Stadium San Giovanni Profiamma
2009	June	22	Varese
2009	June	26	Montebelluna (TV)
2009	July	10	Padua - Pride Village
2009	July	11	Salerno - Festa della pizza
2009	July	24	Rome - Spazio Zero (comunità Arcigay)
2009	August	1	Mola di Bari (BA) - Sagra del polpo
2009	August	6	Manduria (TA) - Festival del fitness
2009	August	14	Nicotera (VV)
2009	August	17	Polignano a Mare (BA) - Plaze Aldo Moro
2009	August	22	Omegna (VB) - Plaze Salera
2009	August	23	Paravati di Mileto (VV)
2009	August	29	Ospedaletti (IM) - Notte Bianca

== Certification ==
Sales	Silver	Gold	References
50.000+	3	1	
