= RossoNoemi =

Studio album by Noemi
- Released: 22 March 2011
- Recorded: 2011
- Studio: Fantasy Studios; Berkeley, California, U.S.
- Genre: Pop rock; soul
- Length: 41:34
- Language: Italian
- Label: Sony Music
- Producer: Corrado Rustici; Celso Valli

Noemi chronology
| Sulla mia pelle (2009) | RossoNoemi (2011) | Made in London (2014) |

Singles from RossoNoemi
- 1. "Vuoto a perdere" Released: 28 January 2011; 2. "Odio tutti i cantanti" Released: 6 May 2011; 3. "Poi inventi il modo" Released: 16 September 2011

Alternative cover
- Cover of RossoNoemi – 2012 Edition

Singles from RossoNoemi – 2012 Edition
- 1. "Sono solo parole" Released: 15 February 2012

RossoNoemi ("Noemi Red") is the second studio album by Italian singer Noemi, released on 22 March 2011 by Sony Music Italy.

The album, with a prominent rock-oriented sound, was preceded by the single "Vuoto a perdere", published on 28 January 2011 and written by Italian singer-songwriter Vasco Rossi, with co-writing contribution by Gaetano Curreri, the leader of the band Stadio. The first single was produced by Celso Valli, while the remaining songs were produced by Corrado Rustici. RossoNoemi was recorded and mixed by engineer Chris Manning.

The second single, "Odio tutti i cantanti", was released on 6 May 2011, while "Poi inventi il modo" was released on 16 September 2011 as the third single from the album.

Following Noemi's participation in the 62nd Sanremo Music Festival, on 15 February 2012 the album was re-released in a new version, including the single "Sono solo parole", which came third in the competition.

The album was certified platinum by the Federation of the Italian Music Industry, for domestic sales exceeding 60,000 units.

== Track listing ==
RossoNoemi – Standard track listing
| No. | Title | Lyrics | Music | Length |
|---|---|---|---|---|
| 1. | "Up" | Veronica Scopelliti; Giuseppe Rinaldi | Scopelliti; Emanuele Fontana; Corrado Rustici | 4:07 |
| 2. | "Fortunatamente" | Scopelliti; Luca Chiaravalli | Scopelliti; Chiaravalli | 4:10 |
| 3. | "Vuoto a perdere" | Vasco Rossi | Rossi; Gaetano Curreri | 4:03 |
| 4. | "Sospesa" | Scopelliti | Scopelliti | 4:27 |
| 5. | "Dipendenza fisica" | Rinaldi | Rustici | 3:50 |
| 6. | "Odio tutti i cantanti" | Diego Mancino; Matteo Buzzanca | Mancino; Buzzanca | 4:35 |
| 7. | "Poi inventi il modo" | Federico Zampaglione | Zampaglione | 3:28 |
| 8. | "Musa" | Scopelliti; Mancino | Mancino | 4:15 |
| 9. | "Le luci dell'alba" | Scopelliti; Luigi De Crescenzo | Fontana | 4:05 |

RossoNoemi – iTunes exclusive bonus track
| No. | Title | Lyrics | Music | Length |
|---|---|---|---|---|
| 10. | "Altrove" (Live version) | Marco Castoldi | Castoldi | 4:34 |

RossoNoemi – 2012 Edition – 2012 re-release bonus tracks
| No. | Title | Lyrics | Music | Length |
|---|---|---|---|---|
| 1. | "Sono solo parole" | Fabrizio Moro | Moro | 3:37 |
| 2. | "In un giorno qualunque" | Marco Ciappelli; Alessandra Flora | Ciappelli; Flora; Stefano De Donato | 3:45 |

== Charts ==
| Chart (2011) | Peak position |
|---|---|
| Italian Albums Chart | 6 |
