= Fotografia (Carl Brave song) =

Single by Carl Brave featuring Francesca Michielin and Fabri Fibra

from the album Notti brave
- Released: 11 May 2018
- Genre: Indie pop; pop rap
- Length: 3:12
- Songwriters: Carlo Luigi Coraggio; Fabrizio Tarducci; Francesca Michielin
- Producer: Carl Brave

"Fotografia" is a song by Italian recording artist Carl Brave, featuring vocals by singer Francesca Michielin and rapper Fabri Fibra. It was co-written by the song's three performing artists, and produced by Carl Brave. The song was released on 11 May 2018 as the lead single from Carl Brave's debut solo studio album, Notti brave. After peaking at number 6 on the Italian FIMI singles chart, "Fotografia" was certified triple platinum in Italy.

== Music video ==
The music video for the song was directed by twins Dan and Dav, and released on 14 May 2018. It is an animated video, created in the style of American series The Simpsons and set on the Lungotevere, in front of Castel Sant'Angelo. It was the 9th most popular music video of 2018 on YouTube in Italy.

== Charts ==
Chart (2018)	Peak position
Italy (FIMI)	6

== Certifications ==
Region	Certification	Certified units/sales
Italy (FIMI)	3× Platinum	150,000^{‡}
^{‡} Sales+streaming figures based on certification alone.
