= Noemi (singer) =

Italian singer-songwriter (born 1982)

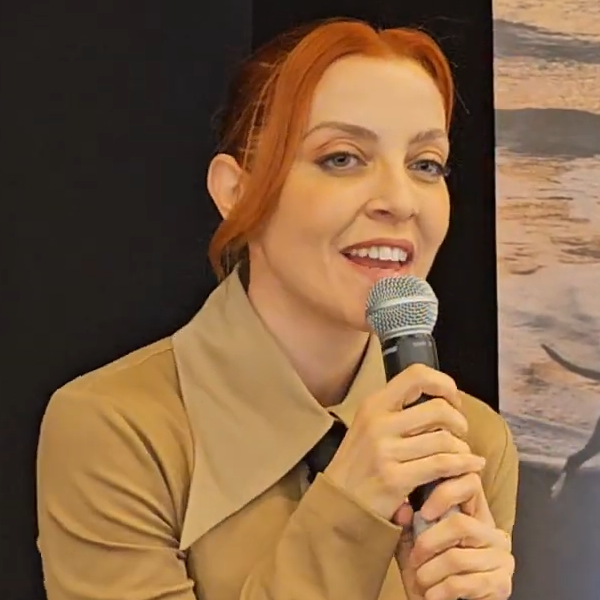
- Noemi in 2025
- Born: Veronica Scopelliti; 25 January 1982 (age 44); Rome, Italy
- Education: Roma Tre University (BA)
- Occupations: Singer; songwriter
- Spouse: Gabriele Greco (m. 2018)
- Musical career
- Genres: Pop; soul
- Instruments: Vocals; guitar; piano
- Works: Discography
- Years active: 2009–present
- Label: Sony Music
- Website: www.noemiofficial.it

Veronica Scopelliti (Italian: [veˈrɔːnika skopelˈliːti]; born 25 January 1982), known professionally as Noemi (Italian: [noˈɛːmi]), is an Italian singer-songwriter. Since rising in fame after competing in the second season of Italian talent show X Factor in 2009, she has released seventh studio albums, promoted by commercially successful songs such as "Briciole", "Vuoto a perdere", "Per tutta la vita", and her Sanremo Music Festival–competing singles "Sono solo parole", "Glicine", "Ti amo non lo so dire", "Se t'innamori muori".

She collaborated with several artists, including with Fiorella Mannoia on Italian chart topper song "L'amore si odia", with Fedez on "L'amore eternit", and on "Makumba" and "Hula-hoop" with Carl Brave. Noemi also performed songs for the soundtrack of Italian films Women vs. Men and Domani è un altro giorno, receiving a special Nastro d'Argento award in 2019.

Noemi served as a judge and coach on The Voice of Italy (2013-2015), Sanremo Young (2019), Io Canto Famiy (2025), and co-host her own radio show and acted in television series Baciato dal sole (2016) and Adoration (2025).

== Early life ==
Noemi was born in Rome, the eldest daughter of Armando and Stefania. Her father was an entrepreneur, and he became a city councilor in Vasto, while her mother was a painter. Both of them tried to pursue a musical career, with Armando competing in the Castrocaro Music Festival, and Stefania performing as an amateur singer. She has a younger sister, Arianna. When she was 19-months-old, she appeared in a TV commercial for diapers brand Pampers. She graduated from the Roma Tre University in 2005, earning a Bachelor of Arts in performing arts. During her studies, she worked as a filmmaker for Italian television Nessuno TV.

== Career ==
=== 2007–2009: SanremoLab, X Factor and breakthrough ===
In 2007, Noemi took part in SanremoLab, a competition aimed at selecting three artists to debut in the Newcomers Section of the Sanremo Music Festival 2008. She was among the twelve finalists with her song "Briciole", but she was not chosen by the artistic director of the 2008 contest, Pippo Baudo. With her band, named Bagajajo, Noemi also performed in several small venues in Rome, mainly singing English-language covers.

In late 2008, Noemi auditioned for the second series of X Factor, which started in January 2009. She was one of four singers in the "Over 25" category, mentored by Morgan. Noemi recorded a studio version of Vasco Rossi's "Albachiara" and Ivano Fossati's "La costruzione di un amore", originally performed at X Factor, for the official show's compilation albums, titled X Factor Anteprima Compilation 2009 and X Factor Finale Compilation 2009, respectively. She was eliminated before the semi-finals of the competition, placing fifth overall. Despite this, she appeared as a guest in the following episode of the show, performing her debut single "Briciole". The song was her entry in SanremoLab 2007, but was never released or publicly performed before. In April 2009, the single peaked at number two on the Italian Singles Chart compiled by FIMI. Shortly after, her self-titled extended play was released by Sony Music. The studio set featured four original songs, including the single "Briciole", and two covers. During the summer of 2009, Noemi toured in Italy, performing at several small local events and patronal festivals.

On 21 June 2009, she was among 43 female artists performing at the San Siro stadium in Milan during the charity event Amiche per l'Abruzzo, created by Laura Pausini with the purpose to raise funds supporting the reconstruction in the territories affected by the 2009 L'Aquila earthquake. She sang Irene Grandi's "La tua ragazza sempre" with Grandi herself, Syria and Dolcenera. On 19 August of the same year, she also performed at the Concerto per Viareggio, a charity event, created by Zucchero, whose proceeds were devolved to the families of the victims of the Viareggio train derailment.

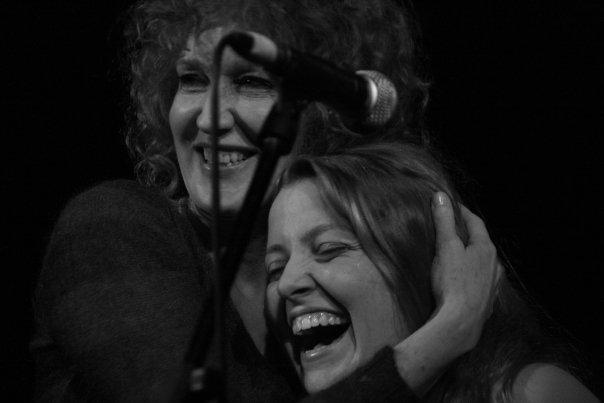
Noemi and Fiorella Mannoia (pictured in 2009) recorded together the song "L'amore si odia", released as the first single from Noemi's debut album Sulla mia pelle

Noemi's first full-length studio album, Sulla mia pelle, was released by Sony Music on 2 October 2009. The album, produced by Diego Calvetti, featured a song written by Baustelle's frontman Francesco Bianconi, and a duet with Fiorella Mannoia, titled "L'amore si odia". "L'amore si odia" was released as the album's lead single, and spent two consecutive weeks at number one on the Italian FIMI singles chart.

From October 2009 to early January 2010, Noemi went on a promotional tour across Italy, titled Sulla mia pelle Live, performing in venues such as the Otel club in Florence, the Garibaldi Theatre in Modica, and the Verdi Theatre in Cesena.

=== 2010: Sanremo Music Festival debut ===
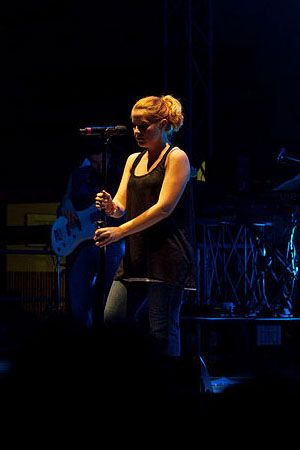
Noemi during a concert in Varallo Sesia in 2010

Noemi was chosen as one of the artists competing in the main section of the 60th Sanremo Music Festival. She performed the song "Per tutta la vita", which was among the top ten entries reaching the final night of the competition, but did not qualify in the top three songs. The final rankings for entries placing between 10th position and 4th position were never revealed, although Avvenire later published an article listing televote results.

"Per tutta la vita" became Noemi's second number one single, and was featured on a new edition of Sulla mia pelle, released in February 2010. To promote the album, Noemi performed several live concerts across Italy between April and October 2010. The tour also included a concert in Nova Gorica, Slovenia. The track "Vertigini" was released to radio stations on 7 May 2010 as the album's last single. A new version of the song was also released as a digital download. Following a dispute concerning phonographic rights with the trade association SCF, radio stations refused to air all new singles released in mid-May 2010, including "Vertigini".

In May 2010, Noemi received three Wind Music Awards, recognizing domestic sales of the album Sulla mia pelle, as well as those of the singles "L'amore si odia" and "Per tutta la vita".

=== 2011–2012: RossoNoemi and second Sanremo Music Festival appearance ===
On 28 January 2011, Noemi released the single "Vuoto a perdere", written by Vasco Rossi and Gaetano Curreri and featured on the soundtrack of Fausto Brizzi's film Women vs. Men. The song received a nomination at the Nastro d'Argento 2011 for Best Original Song. It also served as the lead single for Noemi's second studio album, RossoNoemi, released on 22 March 2011. The album also included the singles "Odio tutti i cantanti" and "Poi inventi il modo".

During the summer of 2011, Noemi promoted the album with several performances, including the concerts of her RossoNoemi Tour 2011, a set at the Heineken Jammin' Festival, and appearances as an open act for Vasco Rossi.

In 2012, Noemi returned to the Sanremo Music Festival, competing with the song "Sono solo parole" and placing third overall. Her entry, penned by singer-songwriter Fabrizio Moro, achieved commercial success, receiving a double platinum certification by FIMI. It also launched a new edition of her second album, RossoNoemi 2012 Edition.

In March 2012, she embarked on a live tour in Italian theaters. On 1 May 2012, Noemi also took part in the International Workers' Day concert in Piazza San Giovanni Laterano, Rome, annually supported by Italian trade unions CGIL, CISL and UIL. Her concert at the Auditorium Parco della Musica in Rome, held on 1 August 2012, was recorded and released as a live album, titled RossoLive, on 18 September 2012. The album also features studio recordings of four new songs, including the single "Se non è amore".

=== 2013–2015: The Voice of Italy and Made in London ===
In March 2013, Noemi debuted as a coach on the first series of The Voice of Italy. She was later confirmed in the same role for the second and third series of the show, in 2014 and 2015, respectively. In order to work on her third studio album, Noemi decided to move to London. The record, therefore titled Made in London, features international collaborations with Dimitri Tikovoï, producer of the track "Don't Get Me Wrong", and Jamie Hartman, who wrote the song "Passenger". The album was released on 20 February 2014, during the 64th Sanremo Music Festival, in which Noemi competed with the songs "Un uomo è un albero" and "Bagnati dal sole". During the second night of the show, "Bagnati del sole" won against "Un uomo è un albero", and the latter was therefore eliminated. "Bagnati dal sole" placed fifth in the Big Artists section, and was released as Made in London lead single. To promote the album, Noemi embarked on the Made in London Tour, which took place between April 2014 and May 2014 in Italian theatres, starting from the Teatro degli Arcimboldi in Milan.

In 2015, Noemi appeared as a featured artist on the single "L'amore eternit" by Italian rapper Fedez, and included in his album Pop-Hoolista. The song entered the top ten in Italy and was certified triple platinum by the Federazione Industria Musicale Italiana.

=== 2016: Cuore d'artista ===
In 2016, Noemi returned to the Sanremo Music Festival, placing 8th in the Big Artists section with the song "La borsa di una donna". During the third night of the show, she also performed a cover of Loredana Bertè's "Dedicato". Noemi and Bertè also recorded a duet version of the song for Bertè's album Amici non ne ho... ma amiche sì, released in April of the same year.

Noemi's fourth studio album, Cuore d'artista, was released on 12 February 2016. It included the lead single "La borsa di una donna", co-written by Marco Masini, as well as tracks written by other popular singer-songwriters Ivano Fossati, Giuliano Sangiorgi and Gaetano Curreri. One of the album's singles, "Amen", also received a nomination at the Voices for Freedom Award 2017, recognized by the Italian section of Amnesty International. In November 2016, Noemi toured across Italian clubs for her Cuore d'artista Club tour.

=== 2017–2018: La luna ===
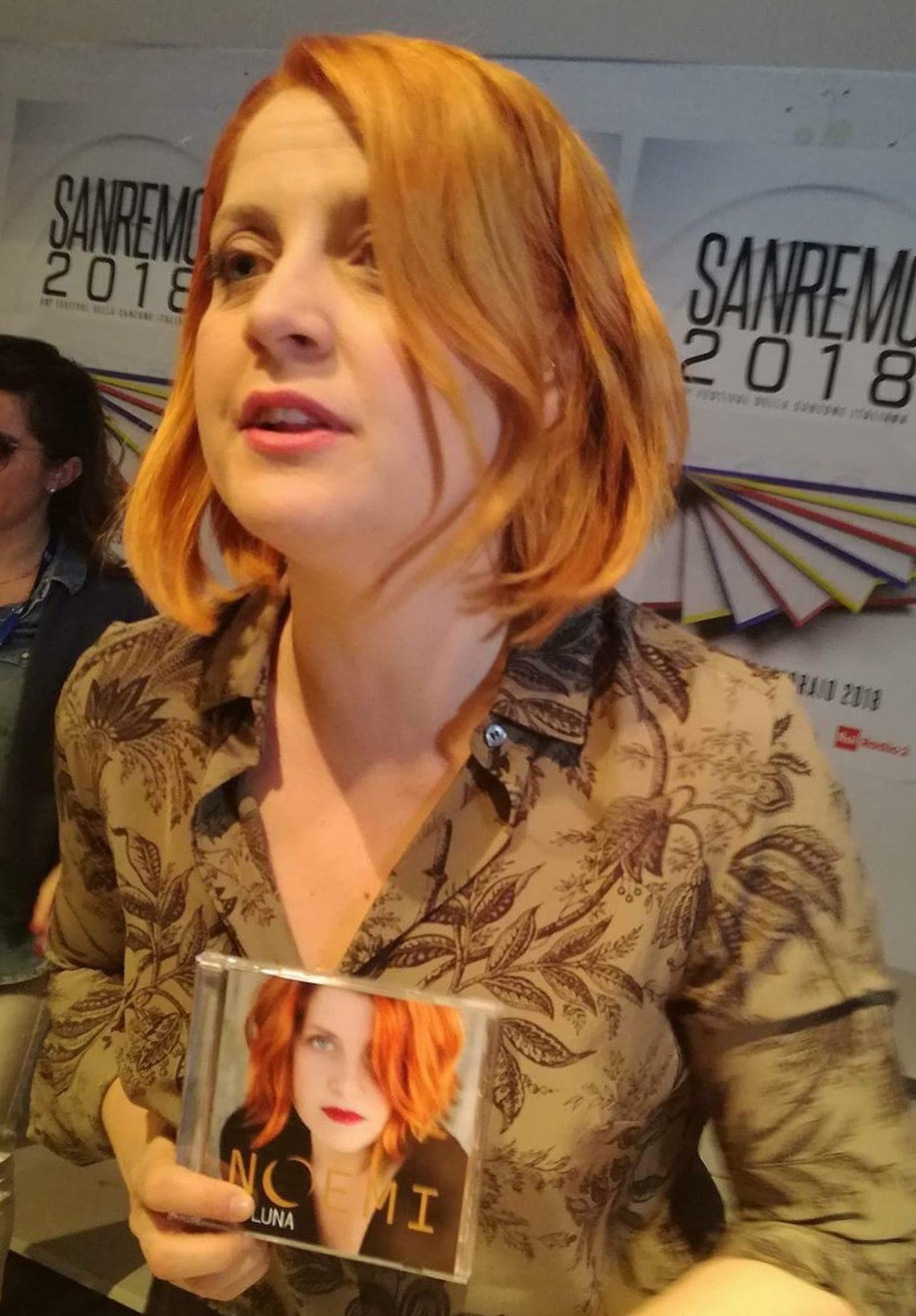
Noemi presenting her album La luna at a press conference during the Sanremo Music Festival 2018

In 2017 Noemi appeared as a featured artist on Spanish rock band Jarabe de Palo's compilation album 50 Palos, recording a duet version of their hit "Mi piaci come sei". On 21 June 2017, she achieved the Guinness World Record as the artist with the highest number of live concerts held in different locations in a single day. She performed on 9 different stages, located at more than 50 km from each other.

In September 2017, Noemi released the single "Autunno", written by Thegiornalisti's frontman Tommaso Paradiso and Dario Faini. The single was followed in December of the same year by "I miei rimedi", a reworked version of a song previously recorded by Italian band La Rua. Both songs were included in Noemi's fifth studio album, La luna, launched during the 68th Sanremo Music Festival, in which she competed with the song "Non smettere mai di cercarmi" and placed 14th. To promote the album, Noemi also released the single "Porcellana" and embarked on the La luna Tour, which took place between May 2018 and August 2018.

In May 2018, Noemi performed the Italian national anthem at the Stadio Olimpico in Rome for the 2018 Coppa Italia Final. During the same event, she also performed her hits "Sono solo parole" and "L'amore si odia".

=== 2019–2020: Sanremo Young and collaborations ===
In February 2019, Noemi appeared as Irama's guest at the 69th Sanremo Music Festival, dueting with him on his song "La ragazza con il cuore di latta". In February and March of the same year she also served as a member of the "Academy" judging the performances of Sanremo Young, a talent show broadcast by Rai 1 featuring contestants aged 14 to 17. Noemi also recorded a cover of Ornella Vanoni's hit "Domani è un altro giorno", which was featured on the soundtrack of the film with the same title, directed by Simone Spada and released on 28 February 2019 in Italian movie theatres. Her rendition was awarded with a special award at the Nastri d'Argento 2019.

On 1 May 2020, she performed at the International Workers' Day concert, the annual event supported by Italian trade unions CGIL, CISL and UIL. As a consequence of the COVID-19 pandemic, the event was adapted to a televised show without any audience, and Noemi performed "Sono solo parole" and "Vuoto a perdere" from the Audtiorium Parco della Musica in Rome. During the same month, she was one of more than 50 artists recording a collective version of Rino Gaetano's song "Ma il cielo è sempre più", under the name Italian AllStars 4 Life. The song was released as a charity single to raise money in support of the Italian Red Cross during the first wave of the COVID-19 pandemic in Italy.

=== 2021–present: Metamorfosi, Nostalgia and Sanremo Music Festival ===
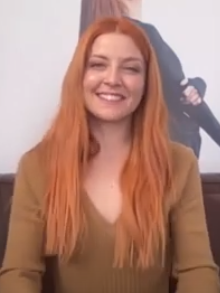
Noemi in 2022

In March 2021 Noemi launched her sixth studio album, Metamorfosi, competing once again in the Sanremo Music Festival with the set's lead single, "Glicine". The song placed 14th in a field of 26, and peaked at number 12 on the FIMI singles chart, later receiving a platinum certification for domestic sales and streaming exceeding 70,000 equivalent units.

On 1 May 2021, she returned at the International Workers' Day concert in Rome, performing "Glicine" and "Vuoto a perdere". In June 2021, she released the single "Makumba", a duet with Carl Brave which became one of the hits of the summer in Italy and received a triple platinum certification. In the meanwhile, Noemi performed live across Italy for her Metamorfosi Summer Tour.

Noemi competed in the Sanremo Music Festival for the seventh time in 2022, performing the song "Ti amo non lo so dire", co-written by Mahmood. Her entry placed fifteenth, and was released as a non-album single. In the Summer of 2022, Noemi released a new collaborative single with Carl Brave, titled "Hula-hoop".

In December 2024, Noemi was announced as one of the participants in the Sanremo Music Festival 2025. She placed 13th with the song "Se t'innamori muori", which anticipated her seventh studio album Nostalgia.

== Discography ==
- Sulla mia pelle (2009)
- RossoNoemi (2011)
- Made in London (2014)
- Cuore d'artista (2016)
- La luna (2018)
- Metamorfosi (2021)
- Nostalgia (2025)

== Tours ==
- Noemi Tour (2009)
- Sulla mia pelle Live (2009–2010)
- RossoNoemi Tour 2011 (2011)
- Made in London Tour (2014)
- Cuore d'artista Club tour (2016)
- La luna Tour (2018)
- Metamorfosi Summer Tour (2021)

== Filmography ==
Television
Year	Title	Role	Notes
2009	X Factor	Herself; Contestant	Season 2
2013–2015	The Voice of Italy	Herself; Coach / Judge	Seasons 1–3
2016	Baciato dal sole	Herself	Miniseries; cameo
2019	Sanremo Young	Herself; Judge	Season 2
2024	Adoration	Diletta	Main cast

Film
Year	Title	Role	Notes
2012	Ribelle – The Brave	Merida	Italian voice-dub – singing part only

== Sanremo Music Festival entries ==
Year	Section	Song and writers	Dueting artist and/or cover song	Result
2010	Big Artists	"Per tutta la vita": (Diego Calvetti; Marco Ciappelli)	—N/a	4th place
2012	Big Artists	"Sono solo parole" (Fabrizio Moro)	"To Feel In Love (Amarsi un po')" − duet with Sarah Jane Morris: (Lucio Battisti; Mogol)	3rd place
2014	Big Artists	"Bagnati dal sole": (Veronica Scopelliti; Richard Frenneaux; Caroline Ailin)	—N/a	5th place
2014	Big Artists	"Un uomo è un albero": (Veronica Scopelliti; Dario Faini; Diego Mancino)	—N/a	Eliminated against "Bagnati dal sole"
2016	Big Artists	"La borsa di una donna": (Marco Masini; Marco Adami; Antonio Iammarino)	"Dedicato" (Ivano Fossati)	8th place
2018	Big Artists	"Non smettere mai di cercarmi": (Massimiliano Pelan; Veronica Scopelliti; Diego Calvetti; Fabio De Martino)	"Non smettere mai di cercarmi" − duet with Paola Turci: (Massimiliano Pelan; Veronica Scopelliti; Diego Calvetti; Fabio De Martino)	14th place
2021	Big Artists	"Glicine": (Tattroli; Ginevra Lubrano; Dario Faini; Francesco Fugazza)	"Prima di andare via" − duet with Neffa: (Giovanni Pellino; Christian Lavoro; Cesare Nolli)	14th place
2022	Big Artists	"Ti amo non lo so dire": (Alessandro La Cava; Alessandro Mahmoud; Dario Faini)	"(You Make Me Feel Like) A Natural Woman": (Gerry Goffin; Carole King; Jerry Wexler)	15th place
2025	Big Artists	"Se t'innamori muori": (Alessandro Mahmoud; Riccardo Fabbriconi; Michele Zocca)	"Tutto il resto è noia" − duet with Tony Effe: (Franco Califano; Francesco del Giudice)	13th place

== Awards and nominations ==
Year	Ceremony	Category	Work	Result
2010	Wind Music Awards	Platinum Album Award	Sulla mia pelle	Won
2010	Wind Music Awards	Platinum Digital Song Award	"L'amore si odia" (with Fiorella Mannoia)	Won
2010	Wind Music Awards	Platinum Digital Song Award	"Per tutta la vita"	Won
2010	Premio Simpatia	Premio Simpatia	Herself	Won
2010	TRL Awards	MTV First Lady	Herself	Nominated
2011	Wind Music Awards	Multi-Platinum Album Award	Sulla mia pelle	Won
2011	TRL Awards	Best Talent Show Artist	Herself	Nominated
2011	Nastro d'Argento	Best Original Song	"Vuoto a perdere"	Nominated
2011	Lunezia Awards	Honorable Mention	"Vuoto a perdere"	Won
2011	Roma Videoclip	Special Award – Artist of the Year	Herself	Won
2017	Amnesty Award	Voices for Freedom Award	"Amen"	Nominated
2019	Nastro d'Argento	Special Award	"Domani è un altro giorno"	Won
2019	Lunezia Award	Stil Novo Award	La luna	Won
2021	TIM Music Awards	Platinum Single Award	"Makumba"	Won
