= Per tutta la vita =

Single by Noemi

from the album Sulla mia pelle (Deluxe Edition)
- Released: 17 February 2010
- Recorded: 2010 – Platinum Studio
- Genre: Soul; R&B
- Length: 3:14
- Label: Sony Music
- Songwriters: Diego Calvetti; Marco Ciappelli
- Producer: Diego Calvetti

Noemi singles chronology
"L'amore si odia" (2009)	"Per tutta la vita" (2010)	"Vertigini" (2010)

"Per tutta la vita" is a song recorded by Italian singer Noemi. It was released on 17 February 2010 as the lead single from the deluxe edition of the singer's debut studio album Sulla mia pelle. The song competed during the 60th Sanremo Music Festival in the section "Artisti".

The song was written by Marco Ciappelli and Diego Calvetti, and produced by the lattet. On 24 May 2010, Noemi was awarded with a Wind Music Award for the song. In March 2010, "Per tutta la vita" was certified Platinum by the Federation of the Italian Music Industry.

== Track listing ==
Digital download

No.	Title	Lyrics	Music	Length
1.	"Per tutta la vita"	Diego Calvetti, Marco Ciappelli	Diego Calvetti	3:21

== Music video ==
The music video produced for "Per tutta la vita" was directed by Gaetano Morbioli.

== Charts ==
=== Weekly chart ===
Chart (2009)	Peak position
Italian Singles Chart	1

=== Year-end charts ===
Chart (2010)	Peak position
Italian Singles Chart	6
Italy Airplay (EarOne)	80
