= Ti amo non lo so dire =

Single by Noemi
- Released: 2 February 2022
- Genre: Pop
- Length: 3:37
- Label: Sony; Columbia
- Songwriters: Alessandro Mahmoud; Alessandro La Cava; Dario Faini
- Producer: Dardust

Noemi singles chronology
"Guardare giù" (2021)	"Ti amo non lo so dire" (2022)	"Hula-hoop" (2022)

Music video
- "Ti amo non lo so dire" on YouTube

"Ti amo non lo so dire" (transl. "I'm not able to say 'I love you'") is a song recorded by Italian singer Noemi. It was released on 2 February 2022 through Columbia Records and Sony Music Italy.

The song competed during the 72nd Sanremo Music Festival, Italy's musical festival which doubles also as a selection of the act for Eurovision Song Contest, where it placed 15th in the grand final. The song peaked at number eleven on the FIMI Single Chart and was certified platinum by FIMI.

== Background and composition ==
The song was written by Mahmood, Alessandro La Cava, Dardust and produced by Dardust. In an interview with Billboard Italia, Noemi described the song and its meaning:

"The song is a metaphor to say that overcoming our frailties takes a lot of courage; [...] It is to explain a new way of experiencing emotions. When you go through a period of change, you have to retake measures with emotions, with people, with what happens to you. Life is like that: you have to learn to say "I love you" in the right way and with the right courage. [...] These are phrases that have to be said with energy, to say that you are not afraid, that you throw yourself into life, it takes the energy of that synth. It's like the heartbeat of someone running. [...] Mahmood wrote a lyric with great sensitivity, I am very happy with the result. It is very poetic, true, honest, a fundamental thing in lyrics."

The song marked Noemi second consecutive participation at the Sanremo Music Festival after 2021 song "Glicine" and her seventh overall.

== Critics reception ==
Il Messaggero described the song as "a metaphor to be able to explain this fragility. "Ti amo non lo so dire" takes immense courage. To tell this dichotomy, I chose an uptempo piece with important lyrics that well represents the energy and balance between mind and body needed to deal with it." Francesco Chignola of TV Sorrisi e Canzoni wrote that the song is "contemporary and evocative," comparing it to the song "Glicine", which tells "an authentic stream of consciousness about the need to overcome the fear of change."

Massimo Longoni of TgCom24 found in the song "two faces: it opens in the groove of Noemi's more classic ballads and then takes off with an explosion of electronics that, accomplice to a killer mix, often overpowers her voice. Between tonal and atmospheric changes, the impression is that she has to chase a bit to stay within the piece".

Francesco Prisco, writing for Il Sole 24 Ore, found in the song "an attempt at rejuvenation" but reiterating that "on the music scene it only takes two years and you rediscover yourself old", however, the singer has "one of the most beautiful soul voices we have in Italy."

== Music video ==
The music video for the song was released on YouTube on 2 February 2022, to accompany the single's release. It was directed by Cristiano Pedrocco.

== Charts ==
Chart (2022)	Peak position
Italy (FIMI)	11
Italy Airplay (EarOne)	18
San Marino (SMRRTV Top 50)	29

== Certifications ==
Region	Certification	Certified units/sales
Italy (FIMI)	Platinum	100,000^{‡}
^{‡} Sales+streaming figures based on certification alone.
