= Briciole =

Single by Noemi

from the EP Noemi
- Released: 10 April 2009
- Recorded: 2009 – Platinum Studio
- Genre: Soul
- Length: 3:21
- Label: Sony Music
- Songwriters: Marco Ciappelli; Diego Calvetti; Francesco Sighieri
- Producer: Diego Calvetti

Noemi singles chronology
"Briciole" (2009)	"L'amore si odia" (2009)

"Briciole" (Italian for "crumbs") is the debut single by Italian singer Noemi. It was released on 10 April 2009 as the lead single from the singer's debut extended play Noemi.

== The song ==
"Briciole" is a song written by Diego Calvetti, Marco Ciappelli and Francesco Sighieri and produced by Diego Calvetti. It got the gold disc.

== Track listing ==
Digital download

No.	Title	Lyrics	Music	Length
1.	"Briciole"	Marco Ciappelli, Diego Calvetti	Francesco Sighieri	3:21

== Music video ==
The music video for "Briciole" was filmed in Verona; it was produced by Gaetano Morbioli.

== Charts ==
Chart (2009)	Peak position
Italian FIMI Singles Chart	2

=== Year-end charts ===
Chart (2009)	Position
Italian Singles Chart	44
