= Carl Brave =

Italian singer, rapper and record producer (born 1989)

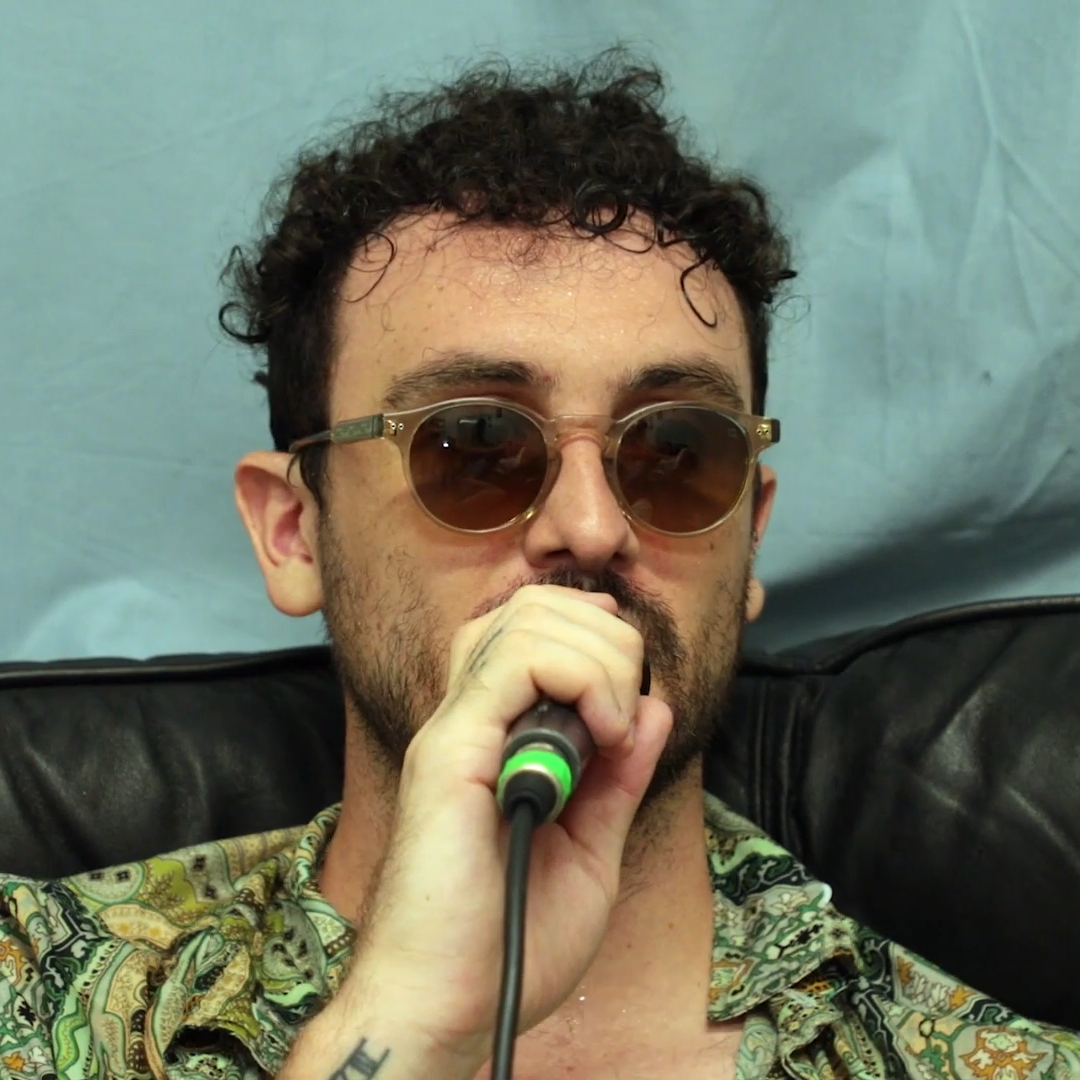
- Carl Brave in July 2023

Background information
- Born: Carlo Luigi Coraggio; 23 September 1989 (age 36); Rome, Italy
- Genres: Pop rap; indie rap; alternative hip hop
- Occupations: Singer-songwriter; rapper; record producer
- Instrument: Vocals
- Works: Discography
- Years active: 2012–present
- Labels: Bomba Dischi; Universal Music; Island; Columbia; Warner

Carlo Luigi Coraggio (born 23 September 1989), better known as Carl Brave, is an Italian singer-songwriter, rapper and record producer.

He rose to fame in 2017, as part of the duo Carl Brave x Franco126, with the album Polaroid. As a solo artist he released two album, Notti brave (2018), which topped the Italian Albums Chart, and Coraggio (2020). As of 2020, the singer has sold over 2 million copies in Italy, thanks to successful singles and collaborations "Fotografia" with Francesca Michielin and Fabri Fibra, Elisa's single "Vivere tutte le vite", "Posso" with Max Gazzè and "Makumba" with Noemi.

== Career ==
In 2017 Carl Brave and Franco126 published their collaborative album Polaroid and embarked on a tour across Italy. At the end of the tour, the duo announced a hiatus to pursue solo projects. His debut solo album, Notti Brave, was released on 11 May 2018. Its lead single, "Fotografia", features vocals by singer-songwriter Francesca Michielin and rapper Fabri Fibra. In November 2018, Carl Brave released a new single, "Posso", featuring Max Gazzè and preceding a repack of the album, titled Notti brave (After).

In 2019, he appeared as a featured artist on the single "Vivere tutte le vite" by Elisa. The singles "Che poi" and "Regina Coeli", both preceding his second studio album, were released in January 2020 and in March 2020, respectively. The second studio album Coraggio was published on 9 October 2020, with the third single "Parli parli" with italian singer Elodie.

In 2021 he collaborated with Noemi on "Makumba" for her sixth studio album Metamorfosi. On 24 June 2022 Brave published the second collaboration with Noemi "Hula-hoop". In March 2023 he released the singles "Remember" followed by the single "Lieto fine", anticipating his third album Migrazione released on June 9, 2023.

In March 2025, after signing with the Warner Music Italy label, he released the single "Morto a galla". The song anticipated the release of his fourth studio album Notti brave amarcord, containing thirteen tracks and released on April 25 along with the single "Perfect" in collaboration with singer-songwriter Sarah Toscano, added to the digital reissue of the album.

== Discography ==
- Notti brave (2018)
- Coraggio (2020)
- Migrazione (2023)
- Notti brave amarcord (2025)
