= Made in London (album) =

Studio album by Noemi
- Released: 20 February 2014
- Genre: Pop; rock; soul
- Length: 39:03
- Language: Italian; English
- Label: Sony Music

Noemi chronology
RossoNoemi (2011)	Made in London (2014)	Cuore d'artista (2016)

Singles from Made in London
- 1. "Bagnati dal sole" Released: 20 February 2014; 2. "Don't Get Me Wrong" Released: 2 May 2014; 3. "Se tu fossi qui" Released: 3 October 2014

Made in London is the third studio album by Italian singer Noemi, released on 20 February 2014 by Sony Music.Recorded in London, the album marks a departure from Noemi's previous work, with optimistic lyrics and a contemporary sound.

The album was launched during the 64th Sanremo Music Festival. Noemi performed the songs "Un uomo è un albero" and "Bagnati dal sole", competing in the Big Artists section. During the second night of the show, a combination of televotes and journalists preferences among her entries determined "Bagnati del sole" as her song for the remaining part of the competition. "Bagnati dal sole" placed fifth in the final. Both songs were included in the album, and "Bagnati dal sole" was released as a single on 20 February 2014. "Don't Get Me Wrong", co-written by Dimitri Tikovoï, was released as the album's second single on 2 May 2014. Made in London's third and final single was "Se tu fossi qui", also included in the soundtrack of the film Ambo.

Charlie Rapino served as the album's artistic producer. Made in London's artwork was developed by Paolo De Francesco, and its front cover shows a stamp representing a profile picture with Noemi's wearing a queen's crown.

== Track listing ==
No.	Title	Writer(s)	Length
1.	"Acciaio"	Veronica Scopelliti; Paul Statham	4:04
2.	"Sempre in viaggio"	Scopelliti; Shelly Poole; Ben Adams	3:12
3.	"Passenger"	Jamie Hartman	3:43
4.	"Se tu fossi qui"	Diego Mancino; Dario Faini	3:29
5.	"Don't Get Me Wrong"	Scopelliti; Dimitri Tikovoï	3:36
6.	"Bagnati dal sole"	Scopelliti; Richard Frenneaux; Caroline Ailin	3:33
7.	"Tutto l'oro del mondo"	Daniele Magro	3:50
8.	"Per cosa vivere"	Scopelliti; Paul O'Duffy	3:24
9.	"Un fiore in una scatola"	Scopelliti; Luca Chiaravalli	3:57
10.	"Un uomo è un albero"	Scopelliti; Faini; Diego Mancino	3:16
11.	"Alba"	Scopelliti; Henrik Barman Michelsen; Edvard Førre Erfjord	2:59

== Charts ==
=== Weekly charts ===
Chart (2014)	Peak position
Italian Albums (FIMI)	2

=== Year-end charts ===
Chart (2014)	Position
Italian Albums (FIMI)	79
