= Makumba (song) =

Single by Noemi and Carl Brave

from the album Metamorfosi
- Released: 4 June 2021
- Genre: Indie pop
- Length: 3:37
- Label: Sony Music
- Songwriters: Carlo Luigi Coraggio; Massimiliano Turi; Mattia Fettina
- Producer: Carl Brave

Noemi singles chronology
"Glicine" (2021)	"Makumba" (2021)	"Guardare giù" (2021)

Carl Brave singles chronology
"Di notte" (2021)	"Makumba" (2021)	"Matrimonio Gipsy" (2021)

"Makumba" is a song by Italian singers Noemi and Carl Brave. It was written by Carl Brave, Massimiliano Turi and Mattia Fettina and produced by Carl Brave. It was released by Sony Music on 4 June 2021 and included in the streaming re-issue of Noemi's sixth studio album Metamorfosi.

"Makumba" peaked at number 4 on the Italian FIMI Singles Chart and was certified platinum in Italy.

== Background ==
The theme of the song deals with a relationship concluded between two lovers who, despite the end of their story, remember with nostalgia, in spite of all those by whom they are envied, towards whom a macumba is superstitiously addressed. Regarding the song and the image of the macumba, Noemi stated: "I am happy to have a light piece like "Makumba" in my repertoire, also because the meeting with Carl Brave was a lot of fun. In this historical period, there is a need to ward off negative vibrations with a wave of optimism. And then, despite its simplicity, "Makumba" allowed me to add additional colors to the color palette of my life".

== Music video ==
The music video for the song was released on YouTube on 17 June 2021, to accompany the single's release. It was directed by Simone Rovellini and was filmed at the beaches of Marina di Ginosa.

== Charts ==
Weekly chart performance for "Makumba"
Chart (2021)	Peak position
Italy (FIMI)	4
Italy Airplay (EarOne)	8
San Marino (SMRRTV Top 50)	10

Year-end chart performance for "Makumba"
Chart (2021)	Peak position
Italy (FIMI)	18

== Certifications ==
Region	Certification	Certified units/sales
Italy (FIMI)	3× Platinum	210,000^{‡}
^{‡} Sales+streaming figures based on certification alone.
