= Metamorfosi (album) =

Studio album by Noemi
- Released: 5 March 2021
- Genre: Pop; R&B; soul
- Length: 37:47
- Language: Italian
- Label: Sony Music
- Producer: Andrea Rigonat; Dardust; MUUT; Carl Brave

Noemi chronology
La luna (2018)	Metamorfosi (2021)	Nostalgia (2025)

Singles from Metamorfosi
- 1. "Glicine" Released: 3 March 2021; 2. "Makumba" Released: 4 June 2021

Metamorfosi is the sixth studio album by Italian singer Noemi, released on 5 March 2021 by Sony Music.

The album was promoted by the single "Glicine", produced by Dario Faini, which competed at the 71st Sanremo Music Festival, and "Makumba", a duet with Carl Brave. The album peaked at number 17 on the Italian Albums Chart and was certified gold by FIMI.

== Background and composition ==
According to Noemi, the renewal of the team allowed her to "abstract from her certainties" about her vocal style, as she wanted to "add some new colors" with the album. Her renditions were more subtle, with a less scratching voice and with reduced vocal ornaments. Working with new songwriters also helped Noemi to create a more contemporary record, as she previously did with Made in London, and to explore new sounds taken from the Italian underground scene, as well as from funky, soul and "retro pop". Its title, literally meaning metamorphosis, reflects this musical change, as well as her personal path, which began when Noemi realized she had lost her love for herself and she felt "unfocused". She then struggled at working on herself to come out of a shell, until she evolved and took back the control of her life. According to Noemi, the album cover―a black and white close-up of herself with a big smile on her face—reflects the moment in which "everything became clearer".

The album featured severals producers and songwriter, including Faini, Francesco Fugazza, Marcello Grilli, Andrea Rigonat, Federica Abbate, Roberto Casalino, Neffa, Franco126, Ginevra Lubrano, Arashi and Mahmood, the latter of which appears under the pseudonym Tattroli.

== Promotion ==
The album was launched during the 71st Sanremo Music Festival, in which Noemi competed with the set's lead single, "Glicine", placing 14th. The song "Makumba", a duet with Carl Brave was released as a single in June 2021 and later added to the streaming version of the album. The song became one of the hits of the summer in Italy and received a triple platinum certification. In the meanwhile, Noemi performed live across Italy for her Metamorfosi Summer Tour, as part of the album's promotion.

== Track listing ==
No.	Title	Lyrics	Music	Producer(s)	Length
1.	"Metamorfosi"	Ginevra Lubrano; Riccardo Schiara	Lubrano; Schiara; Francesco Fugazza; Marcello Grilli	Andrea Rigonat; MUUT	3:15
2.	"Ora"	Lubrano; Schiara	Lubrano; Schiara; Fugazza; Grilli	Andrea Rigonat; MUUT	3:19
3.	"Si illumina"	Federico Bertollini	Bertollini; Dario Faini	Dardust	3:54
4.	"Glicine"	Alessandro Mahmoud; Lubrano	Mahmoud; Lubrano; Faini; Fugazza	Dardust; MUUT	3:37
5.	"L'amore è pratica"	Daniele Magro	Magro	Andrea Rigonat; MUUT	2:57
6.	"Limite"	Grilli; Schiara	Grilli; Schiara	Andrea Rigonat; MUUT	3:32
7.	"Senza lacrime"	Mahmoud; Lubrano; Federica Abbate; Silvia Tofani	Abbate; Fugazza; Grilli	Andrea Rigonat; MUUT	3:41
8.	"Tu non devi"	Giovanni Pellino	Pellino	Andrea Rigonat; MUUT	3:27
9.	"Solo meraviglie"	Roberto Casalino	Casalino; Davide Simonetta	Andrea Rigonat; MUUT	3:15
10.	"Big Babol"	Grilli; Schiara	Grilli; Schiara	Andrea Rigonat; MUUT	3:24
11.	"Musa"	Lubrano; Schiara	Lubrano; Schiara; Fugazza; Grilli	Andrea Rigonat; MUUT	3:26

Digital re-issue bonus track
No.	Title	Lyrics	Music	Producer(s)	Length
1.	"Makumba" (with Carl Brave)	Carlo Coraggio	Coraggio; Massimiliano Turi; Mattia Fettina	Carl Brave	3:37

== Charts and certifications ==
=== Weekly charts ===
Chart (2021)	Peak position
Italian Albums (FIMI)	17

=== Certifications ===
Region	Certification	Certified units/sales
Italy (FIMI)	Gold	25,000^{‡}
^{‡} Sales+streaming figures based on certification alone.
