= Glicine =

Single by Noemi

from the album Metamorfosi
- Released: 3 March 2021
- Genre: Pop
- Length: 3:37
- Label: Sony Music
- Songwriters: Alessandro Mahmoud; Ginevra Lubrano; Dario Faini; Francesco Fugazza
- Producer: Dardust

Noemi singles chronology
"Ispirazione" (2021)	"Glicine" (2021)	"Makumba" (2021)

"Glicine" (Italian pronunciation: [ˈɡliːtʃine]; "Wisteria") is a song recorded by Italian singer Noemi. It was released on 3 March 2021 as the lead single from Noemi's sixth studio album Metamorfosi.

The song was written by Mahmood and Ginevra Lubrano, composed by Francesco Fugazza and Dardust and produced by the latter.

The song served as Noemi's entry for the Sanremo Music Festival 2021, the 71st edition of Italy's musical festival which doubles also as a selection of the act for Eurovision Song Contest, where it placed 14th in the grand final. "Glicine" peaked at number 12 on the Italian FIMI Singles Chart and was certified platinum in Italy.

== Background ==
The song deals with the theme of rebirth, telling the story of a woman who finds the strength to renew herself after the conclusion of a love story despite the nostalgic emotions of her memory. Regarding the image of the wisteria, the artist stated: "It has fragile flowers that seem to break in a breath, but branches so strong that over time they even bend iron. Wisteria has a lot to teach you about how nice it would be to be in the world. Blossoming of a delicate antique, cheeky pink, however, in the deep blue of the night, despite long and tenacious roots that give us life but often also entangle it".

== Music video ==
The music video for the song was released on YouTube on 3 March 2021, to accompany the single's release. It was directed by Attilio Cusani.

== Live performances ==
On 11 April 2021 Noemi performed the song on Che tempo che fa.

== Track listing ==
Digital download
No.	Title	Producer(s)	Length
1.	"Glicine"	Dardust	3:37

== Charts ==
=== Weekly charts ===
Chart (2021)	Peak position
Italy (FIMI)	12
Italy Airplay (EarOne)	8
San Marino (SMRRTV Top 50)	10

=== Year-end charts ===
Chart (2021)	Position
Italy (FIMI)	94

== Certifications ==
Region	Certification	Certified units/sales
Italy (FIMI)	Platinum	70,000^{‡}
^{‡} Sales+streaming figures based on certification alone.
