= Fedez discography =

Discography of Italian rapper Fedez

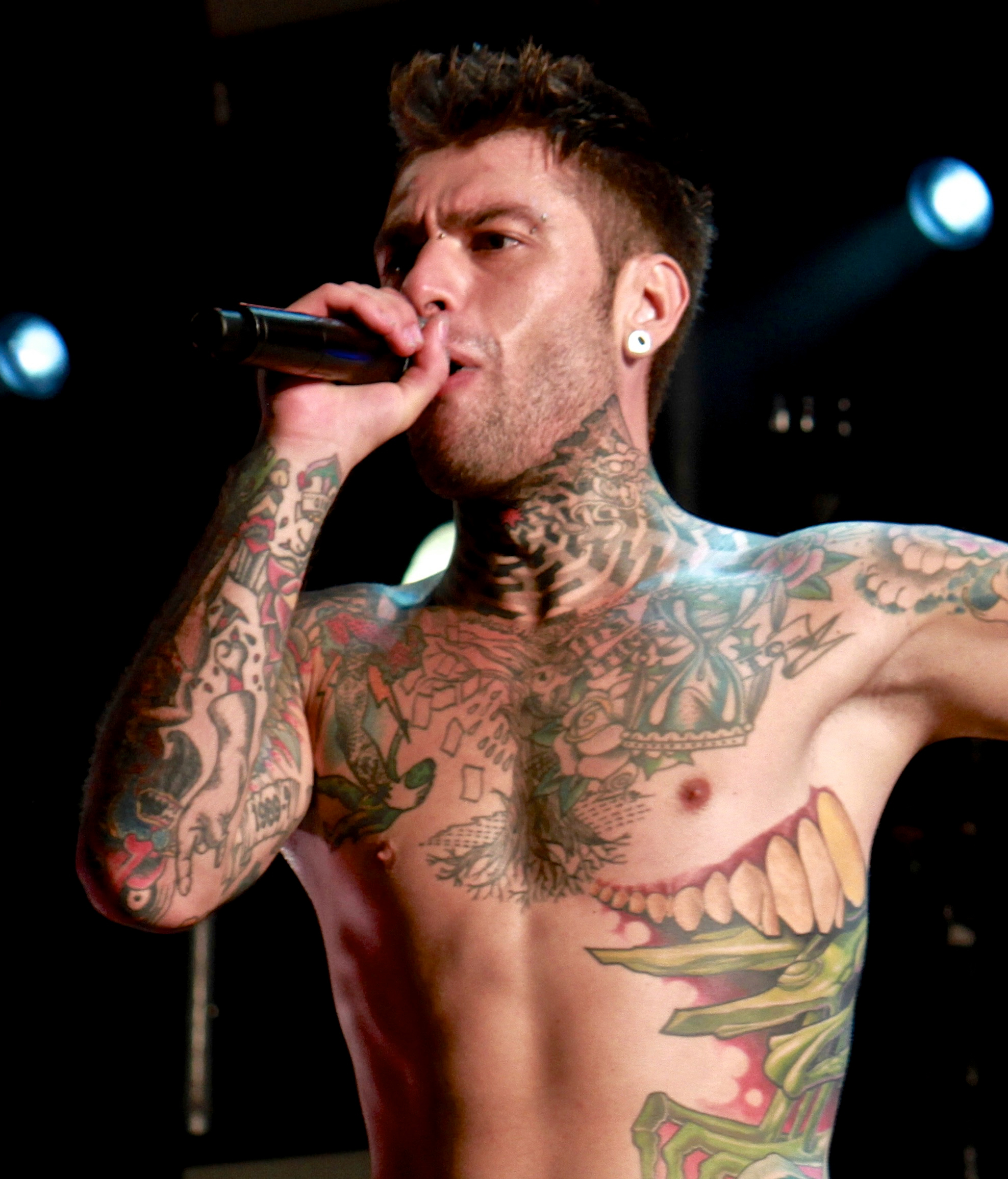
- Fedez in concert in 2015
- Studio albums: 7
- EPs: 1
- Mixtapes: 3
- Singles: 45

The discography of Italian rapper Fedez consists of seven studio albums, three mixtapes, one EP and forty-five singles.

== Studio albums ==
List of albums, with chart positions and certifications
Title	Album details	Peak chart positions		Certifications
Title	Album details	ITA	SWI	Certifications
Penisola che non c'è	Released: 2011; Label: Independent; Format: CD, download	92	—	
Il mio primo disco da venduto	Released: 30 November 2011; Label: Tanta Roba, Best Sound; Format: CD, download	57	—	
Sig. Brainwash - L'arte di accontentare	Released: 5 March 2013; Label: Sony Music; Format: CD, download	1	—	FIMI: 3× Platinum
Pop-Hoolista	Released: 30 September 2014; Label: Newtopia, Sony Music; Format: CD, download	1	—	FIMI: 4× Platinum
Comunisti col Rolex (with J-Ax)	Released: 20 January 2017; Label: Sony Music; Format: CD, download	1	37	FIMI: 4× Platinum
Paranoia Airlines	Released: 25 January 2019; Label: Sony; Format: CD, download	1	3	FIMI: 2× Platinum
Disumano	Released: 26 November 2021; Label: Sony; Format: CD, download	1	—	FIMI: 4× Platinum

== Mixtapes ==
Title	Mixtape details
BCPT	Released: 2010; Label: Blocco Recordz; Format: Download
Tutto il contrario Remixtape	Released: 2011; Label: Harsh Times; Format: Download

== Extended plays ==
Title	EP details
Pat-a-Cake	Released: 2007; Label: Funk Ya Mama; Format: CD
Diss-Agio	Released: 2010; Label: Self-produced; Format: CD, download

== Singles ==
=== As lead artist ===
List of singles, with chart positions and certifications, showing year released and album name
Title	Year	Peak position			Certification	Album
Title	Year	ITA	SWI	WW	Certification	Album
"Si scrive schiavitù si legge libertà"	2013	11	—	—	FIMI: Gold	Sig. Brainwash - L'arte di accontentare
"Dai cazzo Federico"	2013	—	—	—		Sig. Brainwash - L'arte di accontentare
"Cigno nero" (featuring Francesca Michielin)	2013	8	—	—	FIMI: 2× Platinum	Sig. Brainwash - L'arte di accontentare
"Alfonso Signorini (eroe nazionale)" (with Elio)	2013	32	—	—	FIMI: Gold	Sig. Brainwash - L'arte di accontentare
"Nuvole di fango" (featuring Gianna Nannini)	2013	9	—	—	FIMI: Gold	Sig. Brainwash - L'arte di accontentare (Diamond Edition)
"Generazione boh"	2014	15	—	—	FIMI: Platinum	Pop-Hoolista
"Magnifico" (featuring Francesca Michielin)	2014	1	—	—	FIMI: 6× Platinum	Pop-Hoolista
"L'amore eternit" (featuring Noemi)	2015	6	—	—	FIMI: 3× Platinum	Pop-Hoolista
"21 grammi"	2015	4	—	—	FIMI: 2× Platinum	Pop-Hoolista Cosodipinto Edition
"Beautiful Disaster" (with Mika)	2015	5	—	—	FIMI: 2× Platinum	Pop-Hoolista Cosodipinto Edition
"Vorrei ma non posto" (with J-Ax)	2016	1	—	—	FIMI: 7× Platinum	Comunisti col Rolex
"Assenzio" (with J-Ax featuring Stash and Levante)	2016	1	—	—	FIMI: 4× Platinum	Comunisti col Rolex
"Comunisti col Rolex" (with J-Ax)	2016	21	—	—	FIMI: Platinum	Comunisti col Rolex
"Piccole cose" (with J-Ax featuring Alessandra Amoroso)	2017	3	—	—	FIMI: 2× Platinum	Comunisti col Rolex
"Senza pagare" (with J-Ax featuring T-Pain)	2017	1	52	—	FIMI: 8× Platinum	Comunisti col Rolex (Multiplatinum Edition)
"Sconosciuti da una vita" (with J-Ax)	2017	2	—	—	FIMI: 2× Platinum	Comunisti col Rolex (Multiplatinum Edition)
"Italiana" (with J-Ax)	2018	1	20	—	FIMI: 4× Platinum	Non-album single
"Prima di ogni cosa"	2018	1	31	—	FIMI: Platinum	Paranoia Airlines
"Che cazzo ridi" (with Tedua featuring Trippie Redd)	2019	2	—	—		Paranoia Airlines
"Holding Out for You" (featuring Zara Larsson)	2019	4	—	—	FIMI: Gold	Paranoia Airlines
"Le feste di Pablo" (with Cara)	2020	1	—	—	FIMI: Platinum	Non-album single
"Problemi con tutti"	2020	2	—	—	FIMI: Gold	Disumano
"Bimbi per strada (Children)" (with Robert Miles)	2020	4	81	—	FIMI: 3× Platinum	Disumano
"Bella storia"	2020	7	—	—	FIMI: 3× Platinum	Disumano
"Chiamami per nome" (with Francesca Michielin)	2021	1	19	—	FIMI: 3× Platinum	Disumano
"Mille" (with Achille Lauro and Orietta Berti)	2021	1	43	—	FIMI: 6× Platinum	Disumano
"Meglio del cinema"	2021	1	92	—	FIMI: Platinum	Disumano
"Morire morire"	2021	72	—	—		Disumano
"Sapore" (featuring Tedua)	2021	2	—	—	FIMI: 2× Platinum	Disumano
"La dolce vita" (with Tananai and Mara Sattei)	2022	1	44	—	FIMI: 6× Platinum; IPFI CH: Gold	Disumano
"Viola" (featuring Salmo)	2022	3	—	—	FIMI: 2× Platinum	Disumano
"Crisi di stato"	2022	29	—	—	FIMI: Gold	Disumano
"Disco Paradise" (with Annalisa and Articolo 31)	2023	3	88	—	FIMI: 5× Platinum	Non-album singles
"Sexy Shop" (with Emis Killa)	2024	3	—	—	FIMI: 2× Platinum	Non-album singles
"Di Caprio" (featuring Niky Savage)	2024	5	—	—		Non-album singles
"Allucinazione collettiva"	2024	12	—	—		Non-album singles
"Battito"	2025	2	15	156	FIMI: Platinum	Non-album singles
"Bella stronza" (with Marco Masini and FT Kings)	2025	24	—	—	FIMI: Gold	Non-album singles
"Scelte stupide" (with Clara)	2025	13	—	—	FIMI: Gold	Non-album singles
"Temet nosce"	2025	—	—	—		Non-album singles
"Telepaticamente"	2025	83	—	—		Non-album singles
"Male necessario" (with Marco Masini)	2026	1	46	—	FIMI: Gold	Non-album singles
"—" denotes singles that did not chart or were not released

=== As featured artist ===
List of singles as featured artist, with selected
Title	Year	Peak position	Certifications	Album
Title	Year	ITA	Certifications	Album
"Bocciofili" (Dargen D'Amico featuring Fedez and Mistico)	2013	—		Vivere aiuta a non morire
"La cassa dritta" (Two Fingerz featuring Fedez)	2013	—		Two Fingerz V
"Seven" (Caneda featuring J-Ax, Fedez, Gemitaiz, Rocco Hunt, Baby K and Emis Killa)	2015	—		Non-album single
"One Last Time" (Ariana Grande featuring Fedez)	2015	6	FIMI: 2× Platinum	My Everything - Italian Edition

== Other charted songs ==
List of songs, with chart positions and certifications, showing year released and album name
Title	Year	Peak position	Certification	Album
Title	Year	ITA	Certification	Album
"Sembra semplice" (featuring J-Ax)	2013	88	FIMI: Gold	Sig. Brainwash - L'arte di accontentare
"Pensavo fosse amore e invece..." (featuring Gué Pequeno)	2013	35	FIMI: Gold	Sig. Brainwash - L'arte di accontentare
"Faccio brutto"	2013	93		Sig. Brainwash - L'arte di accontentare
"Cambia"	2013	68		Sig. Brainwash - L'arte di accontentare (Diamond Edition)
"Faccio brutto"	2013	53		Sig. Brainwash - L'arte di accontentare (Diamond Edition)
"Sirene" (with Malika Ayane)	2014	39	FIMI: Gold	Pop-Hoolista
"Il giorno e la notte" (with J-Ax featuring Giusy Ferreri)	2017	36	FIMI: Gold	Comunisti col Rolex
"Senza pagare" (with J-Ax)	2017	48		Comunisti col Rolex
"Fratelli di paglia" (with J-Ax)	2017	49	FIMI: Gold	Comunisti col Rolex
"Tutto il mondo è periferia" (with J-Ax)	2017	61		Comunisti col Rolex
"Milano intorno" (with J-Ax)	2017	64		Comunisti col Rolex
"L'Italia per me" (with J-Ax featuring Sergio Sylvestre)	2017	56		Comunisti col Rolex
"Musica del cazzo" (with J-Ax)	2017	67		Comunisti col Rolex
"Cuore nerd" (with J-Ax featuring Alessia Cara)	2017	44		Comunisti col Rolex
"Anni luce" (with J-Ax featuring Nek)	2017	58		Comunisti col Rolex
"Meglio tardi che noi" (with J-Ax featuring Arisa)	2017	32	FIMI: Gold	Comunisti col Rolex
"Allergia" (with J-Ax feat. Loredana Bertè)	2017	66		Comunisti col Rolex
"Pieno di stronzi" (with J-Ax)	2017	87		Comunisti col Rolex
"Favorisca i sentimenti" (with J-Ax)	2017	3	FIMI: Gold	Comunisti col Rolex - Multiplatinum Edition
"TVTB" (featuring Dark Polo Gang)	2019	1	FIMI: Gold	Paranoia Airlines
"Kim & Kanye" (featuring Emis Killa)	2019	10		Paranoia Airlines
"FuckTheNoia" (featuring Annalisa)	2019	31		Paranoia Airlines
"Amnesia"	2019	38		Paranoia Airlines
"Paranoia Airlines"	2019	47		Paranoia Airlines
"Record"	2019	48		Paranoia Airlines
"Sfregi e difetti"	2019	67		Paranoia Airlines
"L'una per l'alcol"	2019	85		Paranoia Airlines
"Così"	2019	94		Paranoia Airlines
"Stupido stupido"	2021	48		Disumano
"Vittoria"	2021	53		Disumano
"Guarda cosa mi fai fare"	2021	84		Disumano
"Vecchio" (featuring Dargen D'Amico)	2021	100		Disumano
"Fuori dai guai" (featuring Cara)	2021	67		Disumano
"Un giorno in pretura"	2021	54		Disumano
"La cassa spinge 2021" (featuring Crookers, Myss Keta and Dargen D'Amico)	2021	49		Disumano
"Fede e Speranza" (featuring Speranza)	2021	92		Disumano

== Collaborations ==
- 2007 – MadMan and Esse P featuring Fedez, Jimmy and Tempoxso – "Una più del diavolo" (from Prequel EP)
- 2009 – Fadamat featuring Fedez – "Rap Looser"
- 2009 – Albe Ok featuring Fedez – "Che ne sai di me"
- 2009 – Michel featuring Fedez – "Colpa del rap"
- 2009 – Emis Killa featuring Fedez – "Pum Pum Pum" (from Keta Music)
- 2009 – Emis Killa featuring Fedez – "Non so"
- 2009 – Emis Killa featuring Fedez – "D Love"
- 2011 – Il Nano feat. Fedez and Jake La Furia – "Ti stai facendo un film"
- 2011 – Don Joe e Shablo featuring Fedez, Canesecco and Gemitaiz – "Fuori luogo" (from Thori & Rocce)
- 2011 – Mondo Marcio featuring Fedez – "Cattiva influenza" (from Musica da serial killer)
- 2011 – Marracash featuring Entics and Fedez – Non passerà (from Roccia Music II)
- 2011 – Denny La Home featuring Fedez – Miracle (from Chiamami Mixtape)
- 2012 – Skyetto, Fedez, Rasti – "Voglio diventare famoso"
- 2012 – Guè featuring Fedez – "L'idea sbagliata" (from Fastlife Mixtape Vol. 3)
- 2012 – Max Pezzali featuring Fedez – "Jolly Blue" (from Hanno ucciso l'Uomo Ragno 2012)
- 2013 – Ted Bee featuring Fedez – "Punk's Not Dead"
- 2013 – Guè featuring Fedez – "Indelebile" (from Bravo ragazzo)
- 2013 – Denny La Home featuring Fedez, Vincenzo da via Anfossi, Sick il Magro and Ted Bee – "Vai a fare in culo" (from Chiamami Mixtape Vol. 2)
- 2014 – Bushwaka featuring Fedez – "Twist" (from Pandamonium)
- 2014 – Denny La Home featuring Fedez – "Epic Fail" (from Curriculum)
- 2015 – J-Ax featuring Fedez – "Bimbiminkia4life" (from Il bello d'esser brutti)
- 2015 – Ion featuring Fedez – "Non c'è più storia"
- 2016 – Alborosie featuring Fedez – "SugarBoy" (from The Rockers)
- 2019 – Enzo Dong featuring Fedez – "Dallo psicologo" (from Dio perdona io no)
- 2021 – Loredana Bertè featuring Fedez – "Lacrime in limousine" (from Manifesto)
- 2023 – Jamil featuring Fedez – "L'odio" (from Flow)
