= List of number-one hits of 2016 (Italy) =

This is a list of the number-one hits of 2016 on the Italian Singles and Albums Charts, ranked by FIMI.

Week	Issue date	Song	Artist	Ref.	Album	Artist	Ref.
1	1 January	"Est-ce que tu m'aimes?"	Maître Gims		25	Adele	
2	8 January	"Est-ce que tu m'aimes?"	Maître Gims		Blackstar	David Bowie	
3	15 January	"Est-ce que tu m'aimes?"	Maître Gims		Vivere a colori	Alessandra Amoroso	
4	22 January	"Est-ce que tu m'aimes?"	Maître Gims		Nonostante tutto	Gemitaiz	
5	29 January	"Ginza"	J Balvin		Vivere a colori	Alessandra Amoroso	
6	5 February	"Est-ce que tu m'aimes?"	Maître Gims		Hellvisback	Salmo	
7	12 February	"Nessun grado di separazione"	Francesca Michielin		Hellvisback	Salmo	
8	19 February	"Ginza"	J Balvin		Capitani Coraggiosi - Il Live	Claudio Baglioni and Gianni Morandi	
9	26 February	"Ginza"	J Balvin		Acrobati	Daniele Silvestri	
10	4 March	"7 Years"	Lukas Graham		Capitani Coraggiosi - Il Live	Claudio Baglioni and Gianni Morandi	
11	11 March	"Faded"	Alan Walker		Zero Gravity	Lorenzo Fragola	
12	18 March	"Faded"	Alan Walker		Tutto in una notte - Live Kom 015	Vasco Rossi	
13	25 March	"Faded"	Alan Walker		On	Elisa	
14	1 April	"Faded"	Alan Walker		On	Elisa	
15	8 April	"Faded"	Alan Walker		Alt	Renato Zero	
16	15 April	"Faded"	Alan Walker		Scrivero' il tuo nome	Francesco Renga	
17	22 April	"Faded"	Alan Walker		Una somma di piccole cose	Niccolò Fabi	
18	29 April	"Sofía"	Álvaro Soler		Black Cat	Zucchero	
19	6 May	"Vorrei ma non posto"	J-Ax and Fedez		Canzoni della Cupa	Vinicio Capossela	
20	13 May	"Sofía"	Álvaro Soler		Black Cat	Zucchero	
21	20 May	"Vorrei ma non posto"	J-Ax and Fedez		Dangerous Woman	Ariana Grande	
22	27 May	"Sofía"	Álvaro Soler		Big Boy	Sergio Sylvestre	
23	3 June	"Sofía"	Álvaro Soler		Big Boy	Sergio Sylvestre	
24	10 June	"Sofía"	Álvaro Soler		Folfiri o Folfox	Afterhours	
25	17 June	"Sofía"	Álvaro Soler		The Getaway	Red Hot Chili Peppers	
26	24 June	"Sofía"	Álvaro Soler		Santeria	Marracash and Guè Pequeno	
27	1 July	"Sofía"	Álvaro Soler		Santeria	Marracash and Guè Pequeno	
28	8 July	"Sofía"	Álvaro Soler		Santeria	Marracash and Guè Pequeno	
29	15 July	"Sofía"	Álvaro Soler		Eterno Agosto	Álvaro Soler	
30	22 July	"Cheap Thrills"	Sia		Eterno Agosto	Álvaro Soler	
31	29 July	"Andiamo a comandare"	Fabio Rovazzi		Eterno Agosto	Álvaro Soler	
32	5 August	"Andiamo a comandare"	Fabio Rovazzi		Eterno Agosto	Álvaro Soler	
33	12 August	"Andiamo a comandare"	Fabio Rovazzi		Eterno Agosto	Álvaro Soler	
34	19 August	"Andiamo a comandare"	Fabio Rovazzi		Black Cat	Zucchero	
35	26 August	"Andiamo a comandare"	Fabio Rovazzi		Glory	Britney Spears	
36	2 September	"We Don't Talk Anymore"	Charlie Puth featuring Selena Gomez		Black Cat	Zucchero	
37	9 September	"Cold Water"	Major Lazer featuring Justin Bieber and MØ		Sfera Ebbasta	Sfera Ebbasta	
38	16 September	"We Don't Talk Anymore"	Charlie Puth featuring Selena Gomez		Pooh 50 – L'ultima notte insieme	Pooh	
39	23 September	"Let Me Love You"	DJ Snake featuring Justin Bieber		Pooh 50 – L'ultima notte insieme	Pooh	
40	30 September	"Let Me Love You"	DJ Snake featuring Justin Bieber		Pooh 50 – L'ultima notte insieme	Pooh	
41	7 October	"Let Me Love You"	DJ Snake featuring Justin Bieber		Revolution Radio	Green Day	
42	14 October	"Ninna nanna"	Ghali		Terza Stagione	Emis Killa	
43	21 October	"Let Me Love You"	DJ Snake featuring Justin Bieber		0+	Benji & Fede	
44	28 October	"Potremmo ritornare"	Tiziano Ferro		0+	Benji & Fede	
45	4 November	"Let Me Love You"	DJ Snake featuring Justin Bieber		Laura Xmas	Laura Pausini	
46	11 November	"Let Me Love You"	DJ Snake featuring Justin Bieber		Vascononstop	Vasco Rossi	
47	18 November	"Assenzio"	J-Ax and Fedez featuring Stash and Levante		Made in Italy	Ligabue	
48	25 November	"Assenzio"	J-Ax and Fedez featuring Stash and Levante		Marco Mengoni Live	Marco Mengoni	
49	2 December	"Tutto molto interessante"	Fabio Rovazzi		Il mestiere della vita	Tiziano Ferro	
50	9 December	"Tutto molto interessante"	Fabio Rovazzi		Le Migliori	Minacelentino	
51	16 December	"Rockabye"	Clean Bandit featuring Sean Paul and Anne-Marie		Le Migliori	Minacelentino	
52	23 December	"Rockabye"	Clean Bandit featuring Sean Paul and Anne-Marie		Le Migliori	Minacelentino	
53	30 December	"Rockabye"	Clean Bandit featuring Sean Paul and Anne-Marie		Le Migliori	Minacelentino	

== See also ==
- 2016 in music
- List of number-one hits in Italy
