= Without Filter =

2001 film

Without filter (Senza filtro)
- Directed by: Mimmo Raimondi
- Written by: Piero Bodrato & Mimmo Raimondi
- Produced by: Valerio Bariletti; Umberto Massa
- Starring: J-Ax; DJ Jad; Luciano Federico; Cochi Ponzoni; Anna Melato
- Music by: Articolo 31; Gemelli Diversi and many others from Spaghetti Funk crew
- Distributed by: Medusa Film
- Release date: 31 August 2001 (Italy)
- Running time: 86 minutes
- Country: Italy
- Language: Italian

Without filter (Italian: Senza filtro) is a 2001 Italian film directed by Mimmo Raimondi starring J-Ax, DJ Jad and Luciano Federico. The film stars the hip hop duo Articolo 31 in their acting debut.

== Cast ==
- Alessandro Aleotti: Nico
- Vito Perrini: Ray
- Albertino: Duca Conte
- Anna Melato: Nico's mother
- Chiara De Bonis: Betty
- Cochi Ponzoni: Nico's father
- Gino Mosna: Attilio
- Kay Rush: Angie
- Luciano Federico: Manu
- Paolo Sassanelli: Vanni
- Luca Aleotti: Grido

== Soundtrack ==
Articolo 31:

- Fatti un giro
- Strada di città 2000
- Fino in fondo
- Perché sì!
- Tranqi Funky
- Un'altra cosa che ho perso
- Guapa Loca
- Raptuz rock
- Domani
- Volume
- Con le buone

Gemelli DiVersi:

- Ciò che poteva essere
- Funky lobby
- Musica
- Un attimo ancora
- Tunaizdanaiz

Space One:

- Latin lover
- Nuda
- Provo per te
- Profumi di strada

Pooglia Tribe:

- Senza problemi
- Cime di rap
- Malati

Le iene:

- Paura

Xsense:

- Poche cose nuove

The Individuals:

- I don't wanna be love

Reggae National Tickets:

- Cose che succedono
