= Spaghetti Funk =

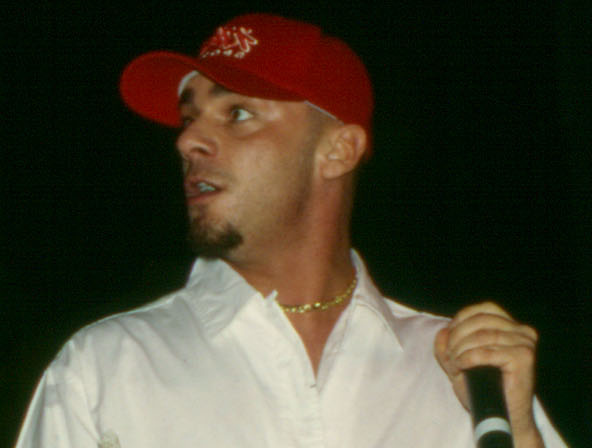
- J-Ax, leader of the crew

Background information
- Origin: Milan, Italy
- Genres: Hip hop, alternative hip hop, funk, pop-rap
- Years active: 1994-2012
- Labels: EMI
- Past members: J-Ax, Raptuz, Space One, Thema, Weedo, Strano, THG, Shu, Dj Zack, Dj Jad, Dj Enzo, Pooglia Tribe, Posi Argento, Ena, Chief, Solo Zippo

Spaghetti Funk was an Italian collective of hip hop musicians.

== History ==
The crew was founded in 1994 by Articolo 31 with the leader J-Ax, from the writer Raptuz and the historian rapper Space One, inspired by an idea of Franco Godi. Initially the crew was broader. It included several members of the hip hop/funk Italian as Chief, Solo Zippo, Huda, Ena, Posi Argento, Pooglia Tribe, Dj Enzo e Dj Jad.
