= Mary (Gemelli DiVersi song) =

Single by Gemelli DiVersi

from the album Fuego
- Released: 14 February 2003
- Recorded: 2002
- Genre: Conscious hip hop; hip hop soul; pop rap
- Length: 5:05
- Label: Do It Yourself Entertainment

Gemelli DiVersi singles chronology
"Tu no" (2002)	"Mary" (2003)	"Tu corri!" (2003)

Mary is a 2003 single by Italian hip hop group Gemelli DiVersi. It was released as the second single from their 2002 studio album Fuego.

The song is their biggest hit: it remained on the top of the Italian charts for several weeks and was certified gold in Italy. It is often considered their signature song.

== Song meaning and significance ==
This is a song against domestic violence and sexual abuse. It tells the story of a young girl, Mary, who is abused by her father. Her friends support her, until one day, she finally manages to run away and leave the town. After some years, Mary returns to see her friends: now she is a beautiful young woman, finally happy and serene. She has a boyfriend and a little daughter, and has finally found real love.
Group member Thema has declared that the lyrics are based on the true story of an ex-girlfriend of his. Along the years, the group has received feedback by many girls who were victims of abuse and, also thanks to the song, have found the courage to speak out about what happened to them.
In 2003, the song also helped to discover and denounce a case of abuse on a then underage girl.

== Music video ==
The video for the song was filmed in Bologna, mainly around the bridge of Stalingrado Street, near Porta Mascarella; it was directed by Carlo Strata.

== Charts ==
Chart	Peak position
Italy (Musica e dischi)	30
