= Io Grido =

Studio album by Grido
- Released: May 3, 2011
- Genre: Rap/Hip hop Crunk; R&B; Chopped & Screwed; Pop Rap; Dirty South
- Label: Sony
- Producer: THG

Grido chronology
/	Io Grido	Happy EP!

Io Grido is the first solo album of Grido, released on May 3, 2011. The album debuted in ninth position on the Italian chart FIMI.

== Track listing ==
#	Title	Featured Guest(s)	Producer(s)	Duration
1	Una musica sola		THG	4:44
2	F.U.F.F.A.		THG	3:21
3	"Sei come me"	Laura Bono	THG	4:51
4	"Come farla su"		THG	4:01
5	"Torniamo a casa Lessie"		THG	3:15
6	"Superblunt"	Danti, Tormento, Sud Sound System	THG	6:20
7	"Doctor Weed"		THG	3:30
8	"Cologno Beach"		THG	3:40
9	"Non ce la fai +"		THG	4:22
10	"Per l'ennesima volta"		THG	5:30
11	"Fumo e malinconia"	Sylvie Simbi	THG	4:49
12	"Io Grido"		THG	4:20
