= Senza pensieri =

Single by Fabio Rovazzi featuring Loredana Bertè and J-Ax
- Released: 10 July 2019
- Recorded: 2019
- Length: 3:05
- Label: Virgin; Universal
- Songwriters: Fabio Rovazzi; Daniele Lazzarin; Jack McManus; Liam O' Donnel; Federico Mercuri; Giordano Cremona
- Producer: Merk & Kremont

Fabio Rovazzi singles chronology
"Faccio quello che voglio" (2018)	"Senza pensieri" (2019)	"Liberi" (2020)

Loredana Bertè singles chronology
"Tequila e San Miguel" (2019)	"Senza pensieri" (2019)	"Figlia di..." (2021)

J-Ax singles chronology
"Ostia Lido" (2019)	"Senza pensieri" (2019)	"Ti volevo dedicare" (2019)

Music video
- "Senza pensieri" on YouTube

"Senza pensieri" (transl. Thoughtless) is a song by Italian singer, producer and filmmaker Fabio Rovazzi, with featured vocals by Loredana Bertè and J-Ax. It was written by Rovazzi, Danti, Jack McManus, Liam O' Donnel and produced by Merk & Kremont.

The song was released by Virgin and Universal on 10 July 2019. It peaked at number 22 on the Italian singles chart and was certified platinum in Italy.

== Music video ==
A 7-minute short film to accompany the release of "Senza pensieri" was released onto YouTube on the same day. The video was directed by Rovazzi himself, and featured various Italian celebrities including Paolo Bonolis, Fabio Fazio, Loredana Bertè, J-Ax, Enrico Mentana, Terence Hill, Maccio Capatonda, Karen Kokeshi, Max Biaggi, Gigi Marzullo and Danti.

== Charts ==
Weekly chart performance for "Senza pensieri"
Chart (2019)	Peak position
Italy (FIMI)	22
Italy Airplay (EarOne)	6

== Certifications ==
Region	Certification	Certified units/sales
Italy (FIMI)	4× Platinum	200,000^{‡}
^{‡} Sales+streaming figures based on certification alone.
