= Volare (Fabio Rovazzi song) =

Single by Fabio Rovazzi featuring Gianni Morandi
- Released: 19 May 2017
- Recorded: 2017
- Genre: Future bass
- Length: 3:47
- Label: Newtopia; Universal
- Songwriters: Fabio Rovazzi; Simone Privitera; Alessandro Miselli
- Producer: Fabio Rovazzi

Fabio Rovazzi singles chronology
"Tutto molto interessante" (2016)	"Volare" (2017)	"Faccio quello che voglio" (2018)

Music video
- "Volare" on YouTube

"Volare" is a song by Italian singer, producer and filmmaker Fabio Rovazzi featuring Gianni Morandi. It was written by Rovazzi and the duo Lush & Simon (Alessandro Miselli and Simone Privitera).

The song was released by Newtopia and Universal Music on 19 May 2017. It peaked at number 2 on the Italian singles chart and was certified quadruple platinum in Italy.

== Music video ==
The official music video was released on the same day via the artist's YouTube channel. It was directed by Rovazzi himself and included cameos of various Italian celebrities such as Maccio Capatonda, Salvatore Esposito, Javier Zanetti, Lodovica Comello, Frank Matano, J-Ax, Fedez and Angelo Duro.

The video reached 2.7 million views on YouTube in one day.

== Charts ==
=== Weekly charts ===
Weekly chart performance for "Volare"
Chart (2017)	Peak position
Italy (FIMI)	2
Italy Airplay (EarOne)	3

=== Year-end charts ===
Year-end chart performance for "Volare"
Chart (2017)	Position
Italy (FIMI)	19

== Certifications ==
Region	Certification	Certified units/sales
Italy (FIMI)	4× Platinum	200,000^{‡}
^{‡} Sales+streaming figures based on certification alone.
