= Tutto molto interessante =

Single by Fabio Rovazzi
- Released: 2 December 2016
- Recorded: 2016
- Genre: Future house
- Length: 2:55
- Label: Newtopia; Universal
- Songwriters: Fabio Rovazzi; Daniele Lazzarin; Riccardo Garifo; Federico Mercuri; Giordano Cremona; Emanuele Longo; Alessandro Martello
- Producers: Merk & Kremont; Marnik

Fabio Rovazzi singles chronology
"Andiamo a comandare" (2016)	"Tutto molto interessante" (2016)	"Volare" (2017)

Music video
- "Tutto molto interessante" on YouTube

"Tutto molto interessante" is a song by Italian singer, producer and filmmaker Fabio Rovazzi. It was written by Rovazzi, TwoFingerz, Merk & Kremont, Emanuele Longo and Alessandro Martello.

The song was released by Newtopia and Universal Music on 2 December 2016. It topped the Italian singles chart and was certified triple platinum in Italy.

== Music video ==
The official music video was released on the same day via the artist's YouTube channel. It was directed by Rovazzi himself with Mauro Russo, and included cameos of various Italian music, television and internet celebrities such as Fedez, J-Ax, Danti, Fabio De Luigi, Enrico Papi, Fabrizio Biggio, iPantellas, Matt & Bise and Greta Menchi.

== Charts ==
=== Weekly charts ===
Weekly chart performance for "Tutto molto interessante"
Chart (2016)	Peak position
Italy (FIMI)	1
Italy Airplay (EarOne)	43

=== Year-end charts ===
Year-end chart performance for "Tutto molto interessante"
Chart (2017)	Position
Italy (FIMI)	80

== Certifications ==
Certifications for "Tutto molto interessante"
Region	Certification	Certified units/sales
Italy (FIMI)	3× Platinum	150,000^{‡}
^{‡} Sales+streaming figures based on certification alone.
