= Faccio quello che voglio =

Single by Fabio Rovazzi
- Released: 13 July 2018
- Recorded: 2018
- Length: 3:21
- Label: Virgin; Universal
- Songwriters: Fabio Rovazzi; Daniele Lazzarin; Marco Sissa; Simone Privitera
- Producers: Fabio Rovazzi; Simone Privitera

Fabio Rovazzi singles chronology
| "Volare" (2017) | "Faccio quello che voglio" (2018) | "Senza pensieri" (2019) |

Music video
- "Faccio quello che voglio" on YouTube

"Faccio quello che voglio" (transl. I do what I want) is a song by Italian singer, producer and filmmaker Fabio Rovazzi. It was written by Rovazzi, Danti, Sissa and Simone Privitera, and produced by Rovazzi and Privitera. It also included uncredited vocal cameos by Italian singers Emma Marrone, Nek and Al Bano.

The song was released by Virgin and Universal on 13 July 2018. It peaked at number 4 the Italian singles chart and was certified double platinum in Italy.

== Music video ==
A 9-minute short film to accompany the release of "Faccio quello che voglio" was released onto YouTube on 13 July 2018. The video was written and directed by Rovazzi himself, and featured various Italian celebrities including Gianni Morandi, Carlo Cracco, Eros Ramazzotti, Fabio Volo, Rita Pavone, Massimo Boldi, Al Bano, Flavio Briatore, Roberto Pedicini, Luis Sal and Diletta Leotta.

== Charts ==
=== Weekly charts ===
Weekly chart performance for "Faccio quello che voglio"
| Chart (2018) | Peak position |
|---|---|
| Italy (FIMI) | 4 |
| Italy Airplay (EarOne) | 1 |

=== Year-end charts ===
Year-end chart performance for "Faccio quello che voglio"
| Chart (2018) | Position |
|---|---|
| Italy (FIMI) | 49 |

== Certifications ==
| Region | Certification | Certified units/sales |
|---|---|---|
| Italy (FIMI) | 2× Platinum | 100,000^{‡} |
^{‡} Sales+streaming figures based on certification alone.
