= Fabio Rovazzi =

Italian entertainer

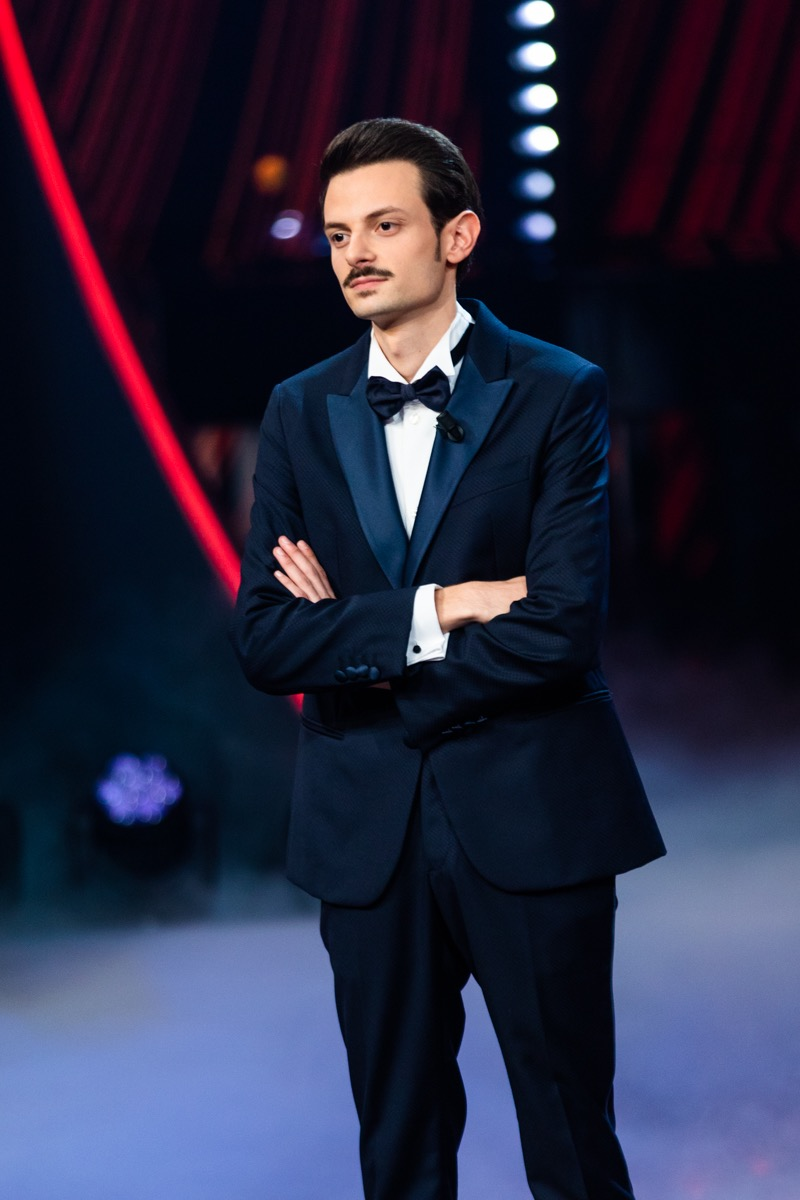
- Rovazzi in 2018

Background information
- Born: Fabio Piccolrovazzi; 18 January 1994 (age 32); Milan, Italy
- Origin: Lambrate
- Occupations: Internet personality; singer; actor
- Instruments: Vocals; PC
- Years active: 2015–present
- Labels: Newtopia (2016–2018); Universal Music Group
- Website: http://www.rovazzi.com/

Fabio Piccolrovazzi, known as Fabio Rovazzi, (born 18 January 1994) is an Italian singer and actor, who is most notable for his hit songs "Andiamo a comandare", "Tutto molto interessante" and "Volare" featuring Gianni Morandi. He studied at a school for producers.

== Biography ==
Rovazzi was born in the Milanese district of Lambrate. As a child, he has cited having listened to Frank Zappa, Elio e le Storie Tese and The Who. Rovazzi joined the list of guests on the Italian entertainment show Quelli che... il Calcio on 11 September 2016. On 29 February 2016 he published a video of a song he played on his social network platforms, "Andiamo a comandare", created in collaboration with Dabs of Two Fingerz; following the widespread popularity of the song, the single was released on streaming platforms by the label Newtopia (Universal Music Group) and was played by various Italian radio networks, which led to its becoming a summer hit. The single entered the singles chart by June—reaching the top position on 29 July 2016—and was certified Platinum. In the same period, Rovazzi participated in several music festivals, including the fourth edition of the Coca-Cola Summer Festival. In 2016, Rovazzi appeared in the music video for "Vorrei ma non posto" by J-Ax and Fedez, and "Che ne sanno i 2000" by Gabry Ponte. Since 11 September 2016 he has joined the ranks of guests on Quelli che il calcio on Rai 2, while on 28 August he participated in the musical television show Bring the Noise.

On 2 December that year he released his second single "Tutto molto interessante", which, on the same day, was accompanied by its music video.

On 19 May 2017 his third single "Volare" was released with the participation of Gianni Morandi. In the summer of the same year, the company Big Babol published a piece of music for the commercial "Solo se ci sei te" (English: "Only if you are there") starring Rovazzi.

In 2018, he starred as the protagonist of the film Il vegetale, directed by Gennaro Nunziante.

On 13 July 2018, his fourth single "Faccio quello che voglio" was released.

In the summer of 2019, an additional song called "Senza pensieri" was released, which featured Rovazzi alongside two other italian singers: J-Ax and Loredana Berte. During the Gemini Man premiere and party hosted by Will Smith in Budapest, Rovazzi met Smith in a hotel room; a video of the two alongside one another was published on YouTube and went viral. Then, in 2020, when Fabio and his wife were in Hollywood, Fabio went to the movie studio for Robert Downey Jr.'s Dolittle for the Italian press, where he then met Downey Jr.

== Voice actor ==
- Ralph Breaks the Internet (2018)
- Stormtrooper (Star Wars)
- Call of Duty: Modern Warfare - Morte (2019)

== Awards ==
- Rovazzi took second place at Summer Festival 2016 with the song "Andiamo a comandare".
- Rovazzi took fourth place at Summer Festival 2017 with the song "Tutto molto interessante".
- Fabio Rovazzi won the Wind Music Award 2017 competition with the song "Volare" feat. Gianni Morandi, and, at the same time, he took third place with the song "Tutto molto interessante".
- Fabio Rovazzi won the Wind Summer Festival 2018 competition with the song "Faccio quello che voglio" feat. Emma Marrone, Nek and Al Bano.

== Discography ==
=== EPs ===
Title	EP details
Greatest Hits	Release date: 13 December 2024; Label: Universal; Format: streaming, digital download

=== Singles ===
Year	Title	Peak chart positions	Certifications	Album
Year	Title	ITA	Certifications	Album
2016	"Andiamo a comandare"	1	FIMI: 5× Platinum	Non-album single
2016	"Tutto molto interessante"	1	FIMI: 3× Platinum	Greatest Hits
2017	"Volare" (featuring Gianni Morandi)	2	FIMI: 4× Platinum	Greatest Hits
2018	"Faccio quello che voglio"	4	FIMI: 2× Platinum	Greatest Hits
2019	"Senza pensieri" (featuring Loredana Bertè and J-Ax)	22	FIMI: Platinum	Greatest Hits
2021	"La mia felicità" (featuring Eros Ramazzotti)	74	FIMI: Gold	Greatest Hits
2023	"Niente è per sempre"	―		Greatest Hits
2023	"La discoteca italiana" (featuring Orietta Berti)	―	FIMI: Gold	Greatest Hits
2024	"Maranza" (with Il Pagante)	66	FIMI: Gold	Non-album singles
2025	"Red Flag" (with Paola Iezzi and Dani Faiv)	―		Non-album singles
2025	"Cabaret" (with Orietta Berti and Fuckyourclique)	―		Non-album singles
2026	"La costiera amalfitana" (featuring Arisa and Nino D'Angelo)	37		Non-album singles

== Filmography ==
Year	Title	Role	Notes
2018	The Generi	Himself	Episode: "Quiz"
2018	Il vegetale	Fabio	Feature film debut
2018	Sanremo Giovani	Himself / co-host	Music contest (season 12)
2018	Ralph Breaks the Internet	Stormtrooper (voice)	Italian dub; voice role
2019	Star Wars: The Rise of Skywalker	Stormtrooper (voice)	Italian dub; voice role
2019	Call of Duty: Modern Warfare	Morte (voice)	Videogame
2020	Don Matteo	Giulio Manzi	Episode: "Non avrai altro Dio al di fuori di me"
2020	The Mandalorian	Stormtrooper (voice)	Episode: "Chapter 8: Redemption"
2022	Obi-Wan Kenobi	Stormtrooper (voice)	Episode: "Part VI"
2022	Sanremo Music Festival 2022	Himself / co-host	Hosted from Costa Cruises Toscana
2022	Con chi viaggi	Michele	
2023	Sensualità a corte	Mr. Bovazzi	Guest star (season 10)
2023	Elf Me	North Pole speaker	
