= Articolo 31 =

Italian band

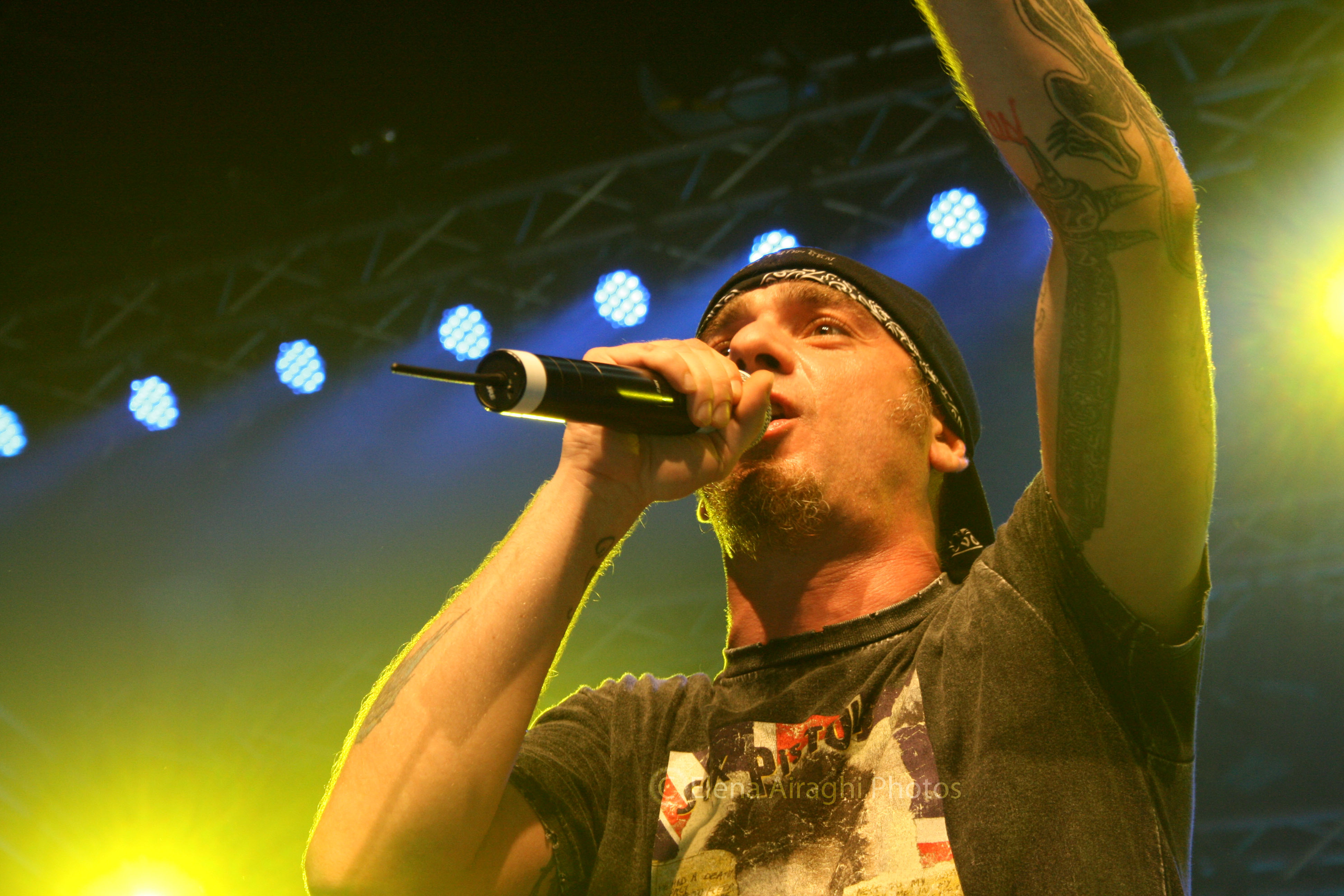
- J-Ax, rapper of the band

Background information
- Origin: Milan, Italy
- Genres: Hip-hop; alternative hip-hop; funk; pop-rap; alternative rock; rap rock
- Years active: 1990–2006, 2018–present
- Labels: Ricordi (1990–1998); BMG (1998–2003)
- Members: J-Ax; DJ Jad

Articolo 31 is a band from Milan, Italy, formed in 1990 by J-Ax and DJ Jad, combining hip-hop, funk, pop and traditional Italian musical forms. They are one of the most popular Italian hip-hop groups.

== Band history ==
Articolo 31 were formed by rapper J-Ax (real name Alessandro Aleotti) and DJ Jad (Vito Luca Perrini). In the spoken intro of the album Strade di Città ("City Streets"), it is stated that the band is named after the article of the Irish constitution guaranteeing freedom of the press, although article 31 of the Irish constitution is not about the freedom of the press. They probably meant the Section 31 of the Broadcasting Authority Act.

Articolo 31 released one of the first Italian hip-hop records, Strade di città, in 1993. Soon, they signed with BMG Ricordi and started to mix rap with pop music – a move that earned them great commercial success but that alienated the underground hip-hop scene, who perceived them as traitors. In 1997, DJ Gruff dissed Articolo 31 in a track titled 1 vs 2 on the first album of the beatmaker Fritz da Cat, starting a feud that would go on for years.

In 2001, Articolo 31 collaborated with the American old school rapper Kurtis Blow on the album XChé SI!. In the same year, they made the film Senza filtro (in English, "Without filter"). Their producer was Franco Godi, who also produced the music for the Signor Rossi animated series.

Their 2002 album Domani smetto represented a further departure from hip-hop, increasingly relying on the formula of rapping over pop music samples. Several of their songs rotate around the theme of soft drugs legalization in Italy (pointing strongly in favour).

Following their 2003 album "Italiano medio", the band took a break. Both J-Ax and DJ Jad have been involved with solo projects. In 2006, the group declared an indefinite hiatus.

Their posse, Spaghetti Funk, includes other popular performers like Space One and pop rappers Gemelli DiVersi.

On 4 December 2022, it was officially announced Articolo 31 participation in the Sanremo Music Festival 2023. "Un bel viaggio" was later announced as their entry for the Sanremo Music Festival 2023.

== Band members ==
- J-Ax – vocals
- DJ Jad – turntables

== Discography ==
Year	Title	Label
1993	Strade di città	Best Sound
1994	Messa di vespiri	Best Sound
1996	Così com'è	Best Sound
1998	Nessuno	Best Sound
2001	Xché sì!	Best Sound
2002	Domani smetto	Best Sound
2003	Italiano medio	Best Sound
2024	Protomaranza	Columbia
