= Il vegetale =

- Theatrical release poster
- Directed by: Gennaro Nunziante
- Screenplay by: Gennaro Nunziante
- Story by: Fabio Rovazzi; Gennaro Nunziante
- Produced by: Pierluigi Crispino
- Starring: Fabio Rovazzi; Luca Zingaretti; Ninni Bruschetta
- Cinematography: Fabio Zamarion
- Music by: Fabio Rovazzi; Giancarlo Russo
- Production companies: The Walt Disney Company Italia; 3ZERO2
- Distributed by: Buena Vista International
- Release date: 18 January 2018
- Running time: 84 minutes
- Country: Italy
- Language: Italian
- Budget: € 7.000.000
- Box office: € 7.694.981

Il vegetale (lit. 'The Vegetable'; colloq. "The Loafer") is a 2018 Italian adventure comedy film directed by Gennaro Nunziante, and starring Fabio Rovazzi.

== Plot ==
Fabio Rovazzi is a Milanese graduate of peasant origin in search of work. He is the son of a rich and greedy company owner, Bruno Rovazzi, who despises him and addresses him as an incapable vegetable. Rovazzi tries various trades. He fails at advertising, manual labor and he even fails at farming. After all this, he also loses the girl he loved, so Rovazzi engages in biological farming.

== Cast ==
- Fabio Rovazzi as Fabio Rovazzi
- Luca Zingaretti as Armando
- Katia Mironova as Irina Kusnir
- Paola Calliari as Caterina
- Ninni Bruschetta as Bruno Rovazzi
- Diandra Elettra Moscogiuri as Skater Girl
- Rosy Franzese as Nives Rovazzi
- Alessio Giannone as Nicola
- Barbara D'Urso as Barbara D'Urso
- Mark Grosy
