= La mia felicità =

Single by Fabio Rovazzi featuring Eros Ramazzotti
- Released: 24 June 2021
- Recorded: 2021
- Length: 2:50
- Label: Virgin; Universal
- Songwriters: Fabio Rovazzi; Lorenzo Urciullo; Antonio Di Martino; Simone Privitera
- Producer: Simone Privitera

Fabio Rovazzi singles chronology
"Liberi" (2020)	"La mia felicità" (2021)	"Niente è per sempre" (2023)

Eros Ramazzotti singles chronology
"Una donna per amico" (2020)	"La mia felicità" (2021)	"Ama" (2022)

Music video
- "La mia felicità" on YouTube

"La mia felicità" (transl. My happiness) is a song by Italian singer, producer and filmmaker Fabio Rovazzi, with featured vocals by Eros Ramazzotti. It was written by Rovazzi, Colapesce and Dimartino, and produced by Simone "Simone Says" Privitera.

The song was released by Virgin and Universal on 24 June 2021. It peaked at number 74 on the Italian singles chart and was certified gold in Italy.

== Music video ==
A 5-minute short film to accompany the release of "La mia felicità" was released onto YouTube on 6 July 2021. The video was directed by Rovazzi himself, and featured various Italian celebrities including Gerry Scotti, Luca Ward, Dani Faiv, Domitilla D'Amico, Eros Ramazzotti and Lillo Petrolo.

A Call of Duty-like Rovazzi's feature was created specifically for the video by company Activision.

== Charts ==
Weekly chart performance for "La mia felicità"
Chart (2019)	Peak position
Italy (FIMI)	74
Italy Airplay (EarOne)	8

== Certifications ==
Region	Certification	Certified units/sales
Italy (FIMI)	Gold	35,000^{‡}
^{‡} Sales+streaming figures based on certification alone.
