= Luciano Federico =

Italian actor

- Born: 28 August 1968 (age 57); Sanremo, Italy
- Occupation: actor

Luciano Federico (born 28 August 1968, in Sanremo) is an Italian actor. He starred in the 1998 film Radiofreccia.

== Selected filmography ==
- Una piccola storia, directed by Stefano Chiantini (2007)
- L'Ex-femme de ma vie, directed by Josiane Balasko (2005)
- The Passion, directed by Mel Gibson (2004)
- Il segreto del successo (2003)
- Forse sì, forse no, directed by Stefano Chiantini (2002)
- Malèna, Italo-German film directed by Giuseppe Tornatore (2000)
- Il diario di Matilde Manzoni, directed by Lino Capolicchio (2002)
- 800 balas, directed by Alex de la Iglesia (2002)
- L'ultima lezione, directed by Fabio Rosi (2001)
- Senza filtro, directed by Mimmo Raimondi (2001)
- Fughe da Fermo, directed by Edoardo Nesi (2000)
- A Love, directed by Gianluca Maria Tavarelli (1999)
- Radiofreccia, directed by Luciano Ligabue (1998)
- Naja (1997)
- Un paradiso di bugie (1997)
- La classe non è acqua, directed by Cecilia Calvi (1995)
- Padre e figlio, directed by Pasquale Pozzessere (1994)
- Fratelli e sorelle, directed by Pupi Avati (1992)
- Ambrogio, directed by Wilma Labate (1992)
