= Senza pagare =

Single by J-Ax and Fedez featuring T-Pain

from the album Comunisti col Rolex
- Released: 12 May 2017
- Genre: Pop rap
- Length: 3:30
- Label: Newtopia; Sony
- Songwriters: Alessandro Aleotti; Federico Lucia; Faheem Rashad Najm; Daniele Lazzarin; Alessandro Merli; Fabio Clemente
- Producer: Takagi & Ketra

J-Ax singles chronology
"Freud" (2017)	"Senza pagare" (2017)	"Sconosciuti da una vita" (2017)

Fedez singles chronology
"Piccole cose" (2017)	"Senza pagare" (2017)	"Sconosciuti da una vita" (2017)

Music video
- "Senza pagare" on YouTube

"Senza pagare" is a song by Italian rappers J-Ax and Fedez. The song was originally included in the artists' collaborative album Comunisti col Rolex in January 2017. A new version featuring guest vocals by American rapper T-Pain was released as a single on 12 May 2017 and included in the digital re-issue of the same album. It was produced by the duo Takagi & Ketra.

The song peaked at number 1 on the FIMI Singles Chart and was the third best-selling single of the year in Italy.

== Music video ==
A music video to accompany the release of "Senza pagare" was released on YouTube on 15 May 2017. It was directed by Mauro Russo and shot between Foggia and Los Angeles. The video featured Paris Hilton, Pio e Amedeo, Francesco Benigno, Chiara Ferragni, and Fabio Rovazzi.

== Charts ==
=== Weekly charts ===
Weekly chart performance for "Senza pagare"
Chart (2017)	Peak position
Italy (FIMI)	1
Italy Airplay (EarOne)	3
Switzerland (Schweizer Hitparade)	52

=== Year-end charts ===
Year-end chart performance for "Senza pagare"
Chart (2017)	Position
Italy (FIMI)	3

== Certifications ==
Certifications for "Senza pagare"
Region	Certification	Certified units/sales
Italy (FIMI)	8× Platinum	400,000^{‡}
^{‡} Sales+streaming figures based on certification alone.
