= Andiamo a comandare =

Single by Fabio Rovazzi
- Released: 18 March 2016
- Recorded: 2016
- Genre: Bass house
- Length: 2:47
- Label: Newtopia; Universal
- Songwriters: Fabio Rovazzi; Federico Mercuri; Giordano Cremona; Marco Sissa; Riccardo Garifo; Daniele Lazzarin
- Producer: Merk & Kremont

Fabio Rovazzi singles chronology
"Andiamo a comandare" (2016)	"Tutto molto interessante" (2016)

Music video
- "Andiamo a comandare" on YouTube

"Andiamo a comandare" (transl. Let's go rule) is the debut song by Italian singer, producer and filmmaker Fabio Rovazzi. It was written by Rovazzi, Merk & Kremont, Sissa and TwoFingerz.

The song was originally released as a music video on Rovazzi's social accounts on 28 February 2016. Following the widespread popularity of the song, the single was released by Newtopia and Universal on Spotify on 18 March and on iTunes in June. Starting from 24 June 2016, the song was played by various Italian radio networks, which led it to become a summer hit.

"Andiamo a comandare" topped the Italian singles chart and was certified quintuple platinum in Italy.

== Charts ==
=== Weekly charts ===
Weekly chart performance for "Andiamo a comandare"
Chart (2016)	Peak position
Italy (FIMI)	1
Italy Airplay (EarOne)	24

=== Year-end charts ===
Year-end chart performance for "Andiamo a comandare"
Chart (2016)	Position
Italy (FIMI)	11

== Certifications ==
Region	Certification	Certified units/sales
Italy (FIMI)	5× Platinum	250,000^{‡}
^{‡} Sales+streaming figures based on certification alone.
