= Prima di ogni cosa =

Single by Fedez

from the album Paranoia Airlines
- Released: 2 November 2018
- Length: 3:06
- Label: Newtopia; Sony
- Songwriters: Federico Lucia; Alessandro Alessandroni; Daniele Lazzarin; Michele Canova
- Producer: Michele Canova

Fedez singles chronology
"Italiana" (2018)	"Prima di ogni cosa" (2018)	"Che cazzo ridi" (2019)

Music video
- "Prima di ogni cosa" on YouTube

"Prima di ogni cosa" (transl. Before anything else) is a song co-written and recorded by Italian rapper Fedez. It was released on 2 November 2018 as the lead single from his fifth studio album Paranoia Airlines.

The song is dedicated to his son Leone, born in March 2018 from the rapper's relationship with wife Chiara Ferragni. It peaked at number one on the FIMI Singles Chart.

== Music video ==
A music video for "Prima di ogni cosa", directed by Darren Craig, was released on YouTube on the same day.

== Charts ==
Weekly chart performance for "Prima di ogni cosa"
Chart (2018)	Peak position
Italy (FIMI)	1
Italy Airplay (EarOne)	17
Switzerland (Schweizer Hitparade)	31

== Certifications ==
Certifications for "Prima di ogni cosa"
Region	Certification	Certified units/sales
Italy (FIMI)	Platinum	50,000^{‡}
^{‡} Sales+streaming figures based on certification alone.
