= Piccole cose =

Single by J-Ax and Fedez featuring Alessandra Amoroso

from the album Comunisti col Rolex
- Language: Italian
- Released: 20 January 2017
- Genre: Pop rap
- Length: 3:35
- Label: Newtopia; Sony Music
- Songwriters: Alessandro Aleotti; Federico Lucia; Roberto Casalino; Alessandro Merli; Fabio Clemente
- Producer: Takagi & Ketra

J-Ax singles chronology
"Assenzio" (2016)	"Piccole cose" (2017)	"Freud" (2017)

Fedez singles chronology
"Assenzio" (2016)	"Piccole cose" (2017)	"Senza pagare" (2017)

Alessandra Amoroso singles chronology
"Sei bellissima" (2016)	"Piccole cose" (2017)	"Fidati ancora di me" (2017)

Music video
- "Piccole cose" on YouTube

"Piccole cose" is a song by Italian rappers J-Ax and Fedez with featured vocals by Italian singer Alessandra Amoroso. It was released on 20 January 2017 through Newtopia and Sony Music Italy, as the third single from the rappers' collaborative album Comunisti col Rolex.

== Description ==
The song, written by J-Ax and Fedez with Roberto Casalino and the producer duo Takagi & Ketra, features the vocal participation of singer Alessandra Amoroso. Thematically, the song deals with the topic of small things, that is, those details that, due to the thousands of everyday distractions, we tend to overlook, but which are actually important and indispensable, like small pieces of a puzzle that are able to give shape and substance to the human being.

== Music video ==
The music video for the song, directed by Mauro Russo, was released on January 20, 2017, through the rappers' YouTube channel.

== Charts ==
=== Weekly charts ===
Chart (2017)	Peak position
Italy (FIMI)	3
Italy Airplay (EarOne)	10

=== Year-end charts ===
Chart (2017)	Position
Italy (FIMI)	44

== Certifications ==
Region	Certification	Certified units/sales
Italy (FIMI)	2× Platinum	100,000^{‡}
^{‡} Sales+streaming figures based on certification alone.
