= Porta Mascarella, Bologna =

Coordinates: 44°30′08″N 11°21′10″E

Porta Mascarella was a gate or portal of the former outer medieval walls of the city of Bologna, Italy. It stands just before the Ponte Stalingrado (Stalingrad bridge).

First erected in the 1300s and rebuilt in the 17th century. The gate once had a drawbridge, but it was ultimately sealed in the 15th century. The now isolated tower once was a machiocolated rampart in the city walls.
