= Comunisti col Rolex =

2017 studio album by J-Ax and Fedez

Studio album by J-Ax and Fedez
- Released: 24 January 2017
- Genre: Pop-rap
- Length: 57:38
- Label: Sony
- Producer: Takagi & Ketra; Reel Big Fish

J-Ax chronology
J-Ax & Friends (2016)	Comunisti col Rolex (2017)	ReAle (2020)

Fedez chronology
Pop-Hoolista (2014)	Comunisti col Rolex (2017)	Paranoia Airlines (2019)

Singles from Comunisti col Rolex
- 1. "Vorrei ma non posto" Released: 6 May 2016; 2. "Assenzio" Released: 18 November 2016; 3. "Piccole cose" Released: 20 January 2017; 4. "Senza pagare" Released: 20 May 2017

Comunisti col Rolex is a collaborative studio album by Italian rappers J-Ax and Fedez. It was released on 24 January 2017 through Sony Music and Newtopia.

== Release ==
In an interview in 2016, Fedex and J-Ax revealed they had planned an album of 30 duets with a variety of successful artists, both Italian and international.

The album was preceded by the singles "Vorrei ma non posto", which became a hit during the summer of 2016, and "Assenzio", released in November 2016. On 21 November 2016, the duo revealed the title of the album, and on 9 December the release date and tracklist, alongside the list of stars featuring on the album were announced. "Piccole cose" was released as the album's third single on 20 January 2017, while "Senza pagare", featuring T-Pain, was released as the album's fourth single on 20 May 2017.

== Title ==
According to the artists, the title Comunisti col Rolex originated from "an insult, which we wanted to turn into a merit: to say that in Italy you can still get rich honestly, and that is a beautiful thing."

== Promotion ==
The album was preceded by two singles, the first of which, "Vorrei ma non posto" was made available for digital download and promoted by a video released on YouTube the same day. The video was among the top 100 viewed videos worldwide at the end of the month of its release.

The fourth single from the album, "Senza pagare", released 12 May 2017, which featured American rapper and producer T-Pain, was promoted with a videoclip filmed in Paris Hilton's house, which also became popular.

On 27 October 2017 the previously unheard single "Sconosciuti da una vita" was released. This single preceded the re-release of the album, which featured five unreleased songs and a live CD and DVD.

== Track listing ==
Comunisti col Rolex – Standard track listing
No.	Title	Writer(s)	Length
1.	"Assenzio" (featuring Stash and Levante)	Alessandro Aleotti; Federico Lucia; Dario Faini; Angelo Rogoli; Alessandro Merli; Fabio Clemente	4:10
2.	"Comunisti col Rolex"	Aleotti; Lucia; Merli; Clemente	4:54
3.	"Il giorno e la notte" (featuring Giusy Ferreri)	Aleotti; Lucia; Federica Abbate; Merli; Clemente	3:31
4.	"Senza pagare"	Aleotti; Lucia; Daniele Lazzarin; Merli; Clemente	3:16
5.	"Fratelli di paglia"	Aleotti; Lucia; Merli; Clemente	3:34
6.	"Tutto il mondo è periferia"	Aleotti; Lucia; Merli; Clemente	3:21
7.	"Milano intorno"	Aleotti; Lucia; Edoardo D'Erme; Merli; Clemente	3:16
8.	"Vorrei ma non posto"	Aleotti; Lucia; Davide Petrella; Merli; Clemente	3:45
9.	"L'Italia per me" (featuring Sergio Sylvestre)	Aleotti; Lucia; Merli; Clemente	3:27
10.	"Musica del cazzo"	Aleotti; Lucia; Merli; Clemente	3:34
11.	"Piccole cose" (featuring Alessandra Amoroso)	Aleotti; Lucia; Roberto Casalino; Merli; Clemente	3:35
12.	"Cuore nerd" (featuring Alessia Cara)	Aleotti; Lucia; Abbate; Lazzarin; Merli; Clemente	2:44
13.	"Anni luce" (featuring Nek)	Aleotti; Lucia; Rogoli; Faini; Merli; Clemente	3:17
14.	"Meglio tardi che noi" (featuring Arisa)	Aleotti; Lucia; Abbate; Faini; Merli; Clemente	3:21
15.	"Allergia" (featuring Loredana Bertè)	Aleotti; Lucia; D'Erme; Merli; Clemente	3:49
16.	"Pieno di stronzi"	Aleotti; Lucia; Aaron Barrett	4:04

Comunisti col Rolex: Multiplatinum Edition – Deluxe edition bonus tracks
No.	Title	Writer(s)	Length
17.	"Senza pagare" (featuring T-Pain)	Aleotti; Lucia; Faheem Rashad Najm; Lazzarin; Merli; Clemente	3:30
18.	"Sconosciuti da una vita"	Aleotti; Lucia; Lazzarin; Riccardo Garifo; Michele Canova	3:00
19.	"Favorisca i sentimenti"	Aleotti; Lucia; Merli; Clemente	2:06
20.	"Devi morire"	Aleotti; Lucia; Petrella; Merli; Clemente	4:13
21.	"Perdere la testa" (feauring Giò Sada)	Aleotti; Lucia; Petrella; Merli; Clemente	3:44
22.	"Il kaos è chiuso"	Aleotti; Lucia; Petrella; Faini; Merli; Clemente	4:03

== Charts ==
=== Weekly charts ===
Chart (2017)	Peak position
Italian Albums (FIMI)	1
Swiss Albums (Schweizer Hitparade)	37

=== Year-end charts ===
Chart (2017)	Position
Italian Albums (FIMI)	2
Chart (2018)	Position
Italian Albums (FIMI)	73

== Certifications ==
Region	Certification	Certified units/sales
Italy (FIMI)	4× Platinum	200,000^{‡}
^{‡} Sales+streaming figures based on certification alone.
