= Paranoia Airlines =

Studio album by Fedez
- Released: 25 January 2019
- Genre: Pop; emo rap
- Length: 47:11
- Language: Italian
- Label: Sony
- Producer: Michele Canova; Badhabit; Iacopo Pinna; Jon Buscema; Kai Kloppfleisch; Lorenzo Sarti; Mybestfault; Takagi & Ketra; Zef

Fedez chronology
Comunisti col Rolex (2017)	Paranoia Airlines (2019)	Disumano (2021)

Singles from Paranoia Airlines
- 1. "Prima di ogni cosa" Released: 2 November 2018; 2. "Che cazzo ridi" Released: 4 January 2019; 3. "Holding Out for You" Released: 11 January 2019

Paranoia Airlines is the fifth solo studio album by Italian rapper Fedez, released on 25 January 2019 through Sony Music Italy.

It was preceded by the release of the single "Prima di ogni cosa". It became available to pre-order on 30 November 2018. Fedez embarked on a tour of major Italian cities in the promotion of the album from March to April 2019.

== Background ==
Paranoia Airlines is Fedez's first solo album since 2014's Pop-Hoolista. The album was mainly produced by Michele Canova, except for three songs, produced by Takagi & Ketra. Fedez stated that he would be leaving as a judge and mentor on The X Factor Italy to promote the album, saying he wants to dedicate himself to his own music.

== Promotion ==
Fedez revealed the cover of the album on social media in November 2018. He later revealed a large billboard in his home city of Milan promoting the album and tour.

== Track listing ==
Track listing adapted from iTunes and Tidal.

No.	Title	Writer(s)	Producer(s)	Length
1.	"Prima di ogni cosa"	Federico Lucia; Daniele Lazzarin; Alessandro Alessandroni; Michele Canova	Canova	3:06
2.	"Holding Out for You" (featuring Zara Larsson)	Lucia; Zara Larsson; Lazzarin; Giovanni Cerrati; Lorenzo Sarti; Giovanni Grandi; Iacopo Pinna; Canova	Canova; Sarti^{[a]}; Pinna^{[a]}; Badhabit^{[a]}	3:01
3.	"Amnesia"	Lucia; Jacopo Ettorre; Cerrati; Simone Privitera	Canova; Takagi & Ketra; Kai Kloppfleisch^{[a]}	2:43
4.	"Che cazzo ridi" (featuring Tedua and Trippie Redd)	Lucia; Mario Molinari; Michael White IV; Lazzarin; Travis Barker; Mark Hoppus; Thomas DeLonge; Canova	Canova	3:36
5.	"Paranoia Airlines"	Lucia; Lazzarin; Canova	Canova; Sarti^{[a]}; Pinna^{[a]}; Badhabit^{[a]}	3:21
6.	"FuckTheNoia" (featuring Annalisa)	Lucia; Annalisa Scarrone; Cerrati; Dani Poppit; Jon Buscema; Sarti; Canova	Canova; Sarti^{[a]}; Pinna^{[a]}; Buscema^{[a]}	2:42
7.	"Record"	Lucia; Federica Abbate; Alessandro Merli; Fabio Clemente	Takagi & Ketra	3:03
8.	"Kim & Kanye" (featuring Emis Killa)	Lucia; Emiliano Giambelli; Cerrati; Canova	Canova	2:55
9.	"Sfregi e difetti"	Lucia; Sarti; Canova	Canova	3:04
10.	"L'una per l'alcol"	Lucia; Merli; Clemente; Stefano Tognini	Takagi & Ketra; Zef^{[c]}	2:40
11.	"Così"	Lucia; Sarti; Patrizio Simonini; Canova	Canova; Mybestfault^{[a]}	3:24
12.	"Un posto bellissimo"	Lucia; Cerrati; Canova	Canova	3:04
13.	"Cosa senza spine" (featuring LP)	Lucia; Laura Pergolizzi; Cerrati; Canova	Canova	2:26
14.	"Segni"	Lucia; Merli; Clemente	Takagi & Ketra	2:16
15.	"Buongiornissimo"	Lucia; Cerrati; Simonini; Canova	Canova; Mybestfault^{[a]}	2:32
16.	"TVTB" (featuring Dark Polo Gang)	Lucia; Nicolò Rapisarda; Dylan Thomas Cerulli; Umberto Violo; Cerrati; Lazzarin; Canova	Canova	3:18
Total length:				47:11

Notes

- "Che cazzo ridi" contains a sample of "Adam's Song", written by Mark Hoppus and Tom DeLonge, as performed by Blink-182.
- "Buongiornissimo" contains a sample of "Where Is My Mind?", written by Black Francis, as performed by Pixies.
- ^{^[a]}signifies an additional producer.
- ^{^[c]}signifies a co-producer.

== Charts ==
=== Weekly charts ===
Chart (2019)	Peak position
Italian Albums (FIMI)	1
Swiss Albums (Schweizer Hitparade)	3

=== Year-end charts ===
Chart (2019)	Position
Italian Albums (FIMI)	7
