= Italiana (song) =

Single by J-Ax and Fedez
- Released: 4 May 2018
- Genre: Reggaeton
- Length: 2:54
- Label: Newtopia; Sony
- Songwriters: Alessandro Aleotti; Federico Lucia; Davide Petrella; Alessandro Merli; Fabio Clemente
- Producer: Takagi & Ketra

J-Ax singles chronology
"Sconosciuti da una vita" (2017)	"Italiana" (2018)	"Come le onde" (2018)

Fedez singles chronology
"Le palle di Natale" (2017)	"Italiana" (2018)	"Prima di ogni cosa" (2018)

Music video
- "Italiana" on YouTube

"Italiana" is a song by Italian rappers J-Ax and Fedez, released on 4 May 2018 by Newtopia.

It was produced by Takagi & Ketra. The song peaked at number one on the FIMI Singles Chart, becoming a summer hit. It was certified quadruple platinum in Italy.

== Music video ==
A music video to accompany the release of "Italiana" was released on YouTube on 7 May 2018. It was directed by Martina Pastori and shot in Los Angeles. By July 2025, the music video on YouTube has gathered more than 95 million views.

== Charts ==
Weekly chart performance for "Italiana"
Chart (2018)	Peak position
Italy (FIMI)	1
Italy Airplay (EarOne)	3
Switzerland (Schweizer Hitparade)	20

== Certifications ==
Certifications for "Italiana"
Region	Certification	Certified units/sales
Italy (FIMI)	4× Platinum	200,000^{‡}
^{‡} Sales+streaming figures based on certification alone.
