= Assenzio =

Single by J-Ax and Fedez featuring Stash and Levante

from the album Comunisti col Rolex
- Released: 18 November 2016
- Recorded: 2016
- Genre: Electropop; deep house
- Length: 4:08
- Label: Newtopia; Sony
- Songwriters: Alessandro Aleotti; Federico Lucia; Angelo Rogoli; Dario Faini; Alessandro Merli; Fabio Clemente
- Producer: Takagi & Ketra

J-Ax singles chronology
"Vorrei ma non posto" (2016)	"Assenzio" (2016)	"Piccole cose" (2017)

Fedez singles chronology
"Vorrei ma non posto" (2016)	"Assenzio" (2016)	"Piccole cose" (2017)

Music video
- "Assenzio" on YouTube

"Assenzio" (transl. Absinthe) is a song by Italian rappers J-Ax and Fedez, with featured vocals by Italian singers Stash and Levante. It was released on 18 November 2016 as the second single from the two rappers' collaborative album Comunisti col Rolex.

It was produced by the duo Takagi & Ketra. The song peaked at number 1 on the Italian Singles Chart and was certified quadruple platinum in Italy.

== Music video ==
A music video to accompany the release of "Assenzio", directed by Mauro Russo, was released on YouTube on the same day.

== Charts ==
Weekly chart performance for "Assenzio"
Chart (2016)	Peak position
Italy (FIMI)	1
Italy Airplay (EarOne)	13

== Certifications ==
Certifications for "Assenzio"
Region	Certification	Certified units/sales
Italy (FIMI)	4× Platinum	200,000^{‡}
^{‡} Sales+streaming figures based on certification alone.
