= Vorrei ma non posto =

Single by J-Ax and Fedez

from the album Comunisti col Rolex
- Released: 6 May 2016
- Recorded: 2016
- Genre: Pop rap
- Length: 3:47
- Label: Newtopia; Sony
- Songwriters: Alessandro Aleotti; Federico Lucia; Davide Petrella; Alessandro Merli; Fabio Clemente
- Producer: Takagi & Ketra

J-Ax singles chronology
"Intro" (2015)	"Vorrei ma non posto" (2016)	"Assenzio" (2016)

Fedez singles chronology
"Beautiful Disaster" (2015)	"Vorrei ma non posto" (2016)	"Assenzio" (2016)

Music video
- "Vorrei ma non posto" on YouTube

"Vorrei ma non posto" is a song by Italian rappers J-Ax and Fedez. It was released on 6 May 2016 as the lead single from their collaborative album Comunisti col Rolex.

The song was written by the two artists with co-writing contribution by Davide Petrella and produced by Takagi & Ketra. It peaked at number 1 on the Italian Singles Chart.

== Music video ==
A music video to accompany the release of "Vorrei ma non posto" was released on YouTube on the same day. It was directed by Mauro Russo and shot in a nomads camp in Reggio Emilia.

== Charts ==
=== Weekly charts ===
Weekly chart performance for "Vorrei ma non posto"
Chart (2016)	Peak position
Italy (FIMI)	1
Italy Airplay (EarOne)	1

=== Year-end charts ===
Year-end chart performance for "Vorrei ma non posto"
Chart (2016)	Position
Italy (FIMI)	5

== Certifications ==
Certifications for "Vorrei ma non posto"
Region	Certification	Certified units/sales
Italy (FIMI)	7× Platinum	350,000^{‡}
^{‡} Sales+streaming figures based on certification alone.
