= Gemelli DiVersi =

Italian hip hop group

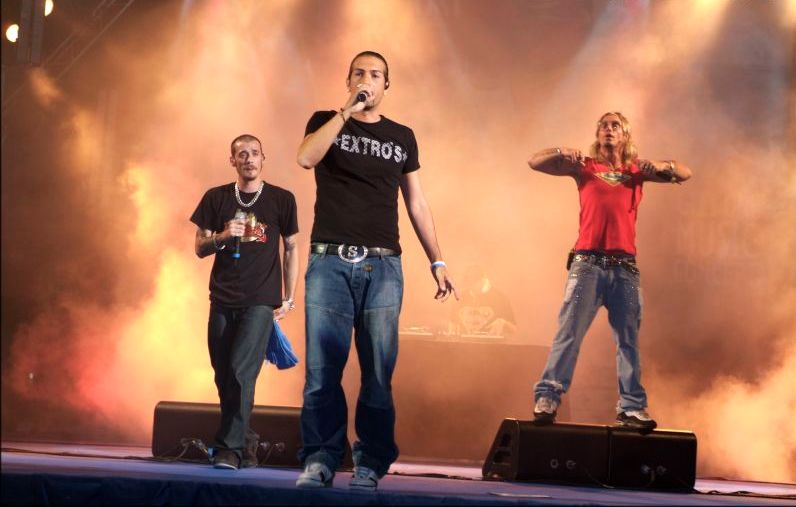
- Gemelli DiVersi in a live

Background information
- Origin: Milan, Italy
- Genres: Hip hop
- Years active: 1997–present
- Members: Thema; Strano
- Past members: Grido; THG
- Website: http://www.gemellidiversi.net

Gemelli DiVersi is an Italian hip hop group, best known for their 2003 hit single "Mary".

== Biography ==
Gemelli DiVersi formed in 1997 in Milan when two Italian rap crews, La Cricca and Rima Nel Cuore, merged. Their first single was 1998's "Un attimo ancora", rapped over a sample of Pooh's "Dammi solo un minuto". The song and the accompanying album were hits in Italy, and the group subsequently made an appearance in a Coca-Cola commercial. 4x4, their sophomore release, followed in 2000, and the group toured with Eros Ramazzotti.

In 2002, they returned with their fourth studio album Fuego and its lead single "Mary", which became a massive hit in Italy, charting for eight months. In 2003, the group was named Best Italian Act at the MTV Europe Music Awards. They appeared at Live 8 in Italy in 2005 and starred in their own MTV Italy show called Pimp My Wheels, based on Pimp My Ride. In 2007 they released the album Boom! and in 2009 they released Senza fine 98–09 – The Greatest Hits, featuring all their singles along with four new songs.

== Members ==
=== Current members ===
- Francesco Stranges (Strano) - vocals
- Emanuele Busnaghi (Thema) - rapping

=== Past members ===
- Luca Paolo Aleotti (Grido)
- Alessandro Merli (THG)

== Discography ==
- Gemelli DiVersi (1998)
- 4x4 (2000)
- Come piace a me (2001)
- Fuego (2002)
- Fuego Special Edition (2xCD) (2003)
- Reality Show (2004)
- Boom! (2007)
- Senza fine '98–'09 (2009; ITA: Gold)
- Tutto da capo (2012)
- Uppercut (2016)
