= J-Ax =

Italian rapper (born 1972)

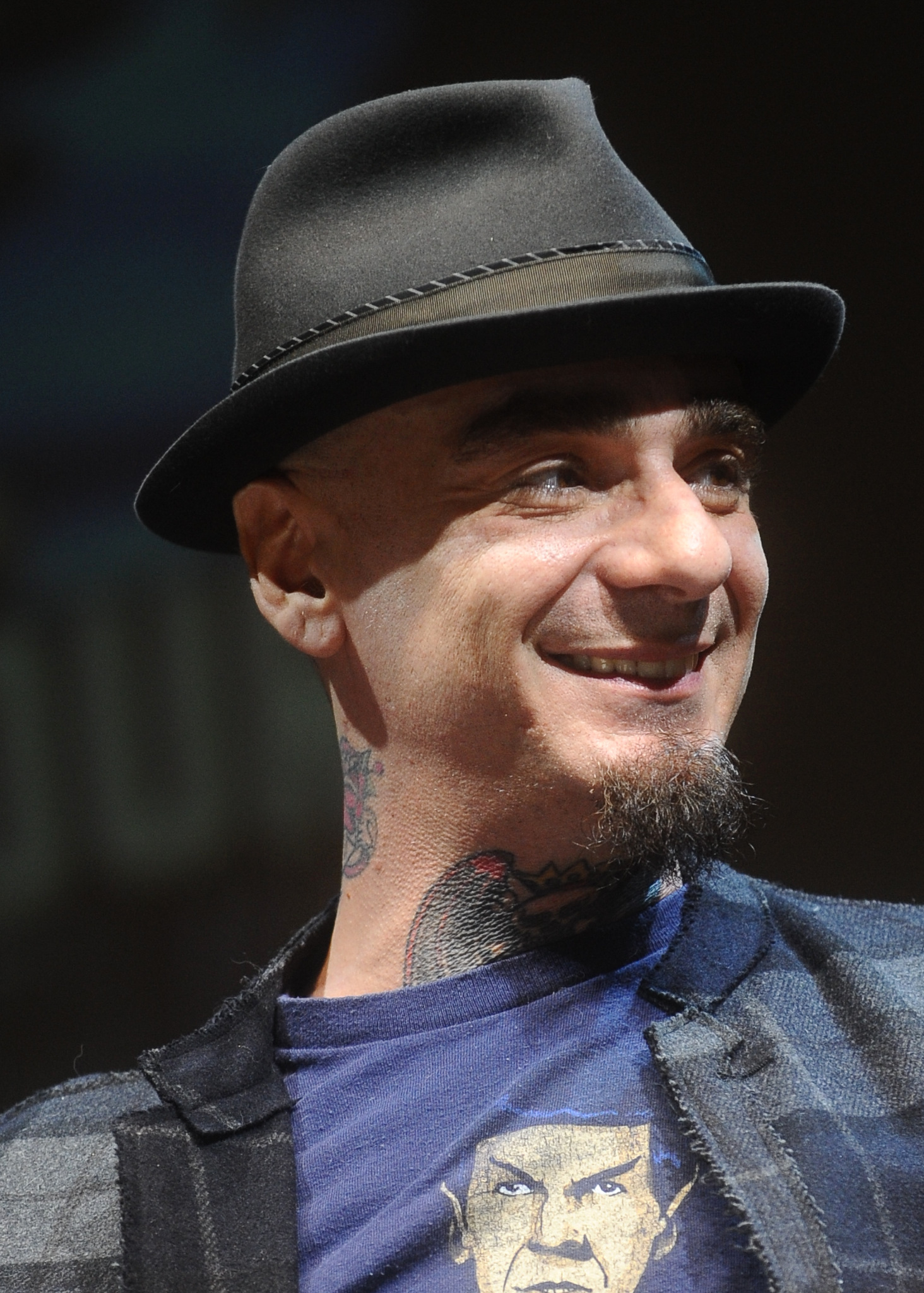
- J-Ax at Lucca Comics & Games 2016

Background information
- Born: Alessandro Aleotti; 5 August 1972 (age 54)
- Origin: Milan, Italy
- Genres: Hip hop; rap rock; pop; pop rap; funk; electro hop
- Occupations: Rapper; Singer-songwriter
- Years active: 1990–present
- Labels: EMI; Newtopia
- Website: Official website

Alessandro Aleotti (Italian: [alesˈsandro aleˈɔtti]; born 5 August 1972), known professionally as J-Ax (Italian: [dʒeˈjaks]), is an Italian rapper and singer-songwriter, part of the rap group Articolo 31 with his DJ Vito Luca Perrini (DJ Jad). He is the brother of Grido (formerly part of Gemelli DiVersi). During 2010, he authored one album with Neffa forming a temporary band called Due di Picche ('Two of Spades').

== Biography ==
From 1990 to 2005, J-Ax (abbreviation of Joker Alex) rose to prominence as part of the popular Italian rap group Articolo 31 which he founded with Vito Luca Perrini, AKA "DJ Jad". In 2014, he became a judge on the show The Voice of Italy.

=== Soloist ===
In 2006, J-Ax released his first solo album, Di sana pianta. This album, which was very pop oriented, spawned no fewer than six singles: "S.N.O.B.", "Tua mamma", "Ti amo o ti ammazzo", "Acqua nella scuola", "Piccoli per sempre" and "Escono i pazzi". The single "Ti amo o ti ammazzo" was also translated and released in Spanish as "Te amo o te mato". This album continued themes used by Articolo 31, such as knowing love ("Ti amo o ti ammazzo"), criticising society, ("S.N.O.B.", "Tua mamma") and the protection of immigrants ("Escono i pazzi", "Fumo ancora").

In 2007, he teamed up with The Styles to release the single "Più Stile", which won at the MTV Europe Music Awards for "Best Italian Act".

In the same year, he released material with some of "Spaghetti Funk", a crew which he created at the same time as Articolo 31 in the 90s with Gemelli DiVersi, Space One, Raptuz TDK (a writer) and a lot of other singers that now aren't in the crew.

Later, on the album Di sana pianta he released the song "S.N.O.B. reloaded" with Space One, Gué Pequeno, Jake La Furia, Marracash, Don Joe and Fabio B. In 2007, he also participated in MTV Day with DJ Jad and reformed their old group for a day.

J-Ax did not release an album in 2007, although he had many projects on, which continued into 2008. He sang on "Amici un cazzo" by Space One with Gemelli Diversi, "Come noi" by Pino Scotto and Fattore wow with Marracash and Gue Pequeno. He also wrote three songs in that year: "Uno di noi", a thank you to his fans; "Limonare al multisala", for the soundtrack of the film Ti stramo; and "I vecchietti fanno oh", the first single of his next album.

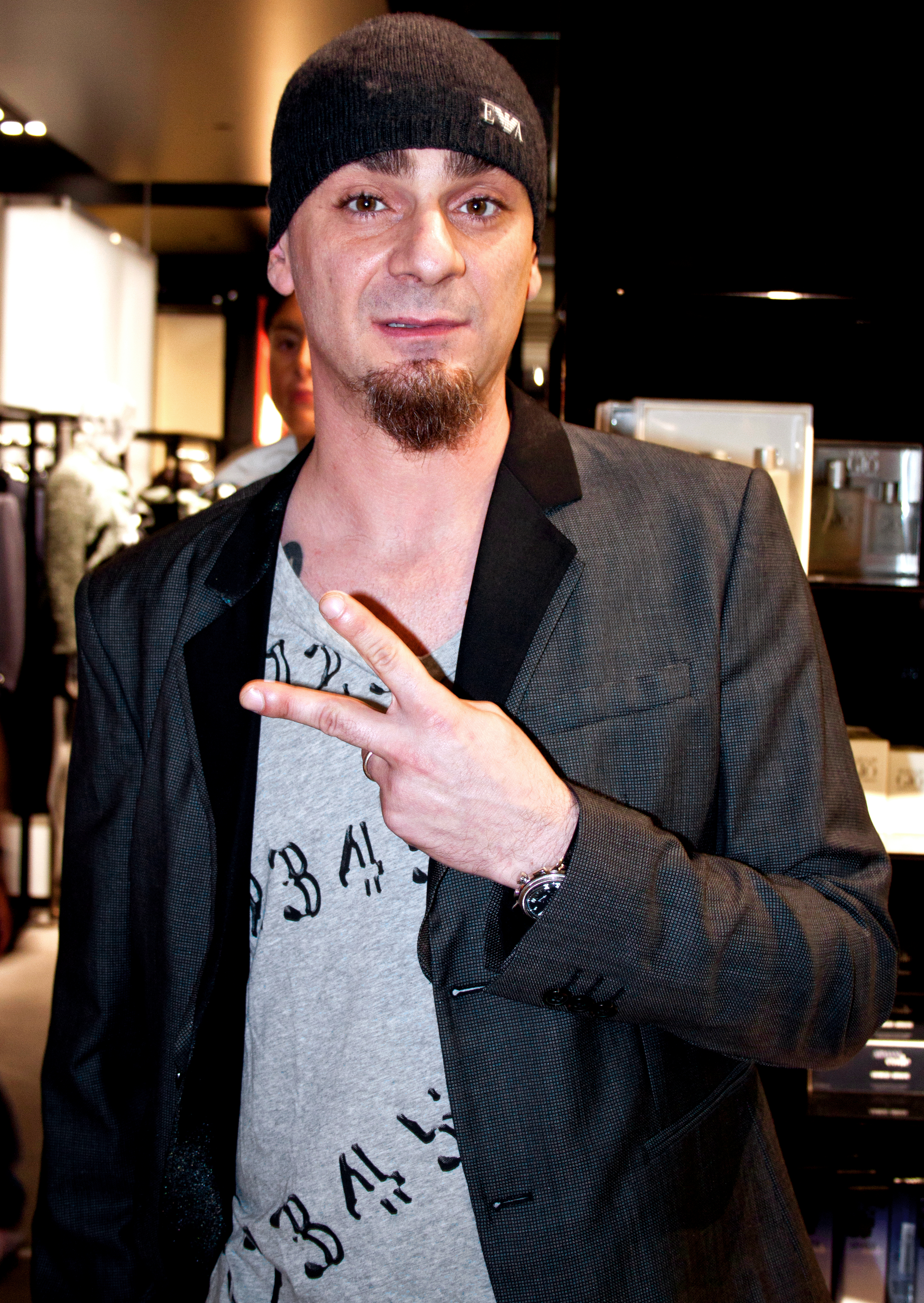
J-Ax in 2009

At the beginning of 2009, J-Ax launched a project: to release two CDs in the year. The first, Rap N' Roll was released at the end of January. As well as "I vecchietti fanno oh", he released 3 singles: "Aumentaci le dosi", "3 paperelle" and "Rap N' Roll". Artists who worked with him on the album include Space One, DJ Zak, Gué Pequeno, Irene Viboras, Fabio B and Guido Style, with whom he had worked since "Più Stile".

In summer 2009, he released his third CD as a solo artist, Deca dance. J-Ax paid homage to house music with this album with the single "Deca Dance" as well as more traditional singles with "Come un sasso" and "Vendesi idolo". He also shows his sense of humour on "I love paranoia" and "Come un sasso". Pino Daniele, Marracash, Grido and Jovanotti took part in the album as well as another partnership with The Styles.

In 2011, J-Ax appeared on the remix of Kasabian's single "Man of Simple Pleasures".

On 30 November 2025, he was announced among the participants of the Sanremo Music Festival 2026. He competed with the song "Italia Starter Pack".

== Discography ==
=== With Articolo 31 ===
- 1993 – È Natale (ma io non-ci sto dentro)
- 1993 – Strade di città
- 1994 – Messa di vespiri
- 1996 – Così com'è
- 1998 – Nessuno
- 1999 – Xché sì
- 2000 – Greatest hits
- 2002 – Domani smetto
- 2003 – Italiano medio
- 2004 – La riconquista del forum

=== Solo ===
- 2006 – Di sana pianta
- 2009 – Rap n' Roll
- 2009 – Deca Dance
- 2011 – Meglio prima (?)
- 2015 – Il bello d'esser brutti
- 2020 – ReAle

=== Collaborations ===
- 2010 – C'eravamo tanto odiati with Neffa (Due di Picche)
- 2017 – Comunisti col Rolex with Fedez

=== Singles ===
==== Since 2006 – solo ====
- 2006: "S.N.O.B. (Senza Nessun Obbligo Baciaculistico)"
- 2006: "Ti amo o ti ammazzo"
- 2006: "Piccoli per sempre"
- 2006: "Escono i pazzi"
- 2006: "Aqua nella scquola"
- 2007: "Tua mamma"
- 2007: "Fumo ancora – L'esame della bamba"
- 2007: "Quotidiana"
- 2007: "Ti amo o ti ammazzo" (Spanish: "Te amo o te mato")
- 2007: "S.N.O.B. reloaded"
- 2007: "+ Stile" (featuring The Styles)
- 2008: "Come noi" (from the album Datevi Fuoco by Pino Scotto)
- 2008: "Uno di noi" (featuring Spaghetti Funk)
- 2009: "Rap n' Roll" (featuring Guè Pequeno)
- 2009: "I vecchietti fanno O"
- 2009: "Limonare al multisala" (featuring The Styles)
- 2009: "Aumentaci le dosi"
- 2009: "Tre paperelle" (featuring Irene Viboras)
- 2009: "Il sole dentro di me" (featuring Pino Daniele)
- 2009: "Deca dance"
- 2009: "Anni amari" (featuring Pino Daniele)
- 2011: "Dentro me"
- 2011: "Altra vita"
- 2011: "Meglio prima"
- 2011: "Domenica da coma"
- 2011: "I Love My Bike"
- 2012: "Tutta scena"
- 2012: "Brillo ma da lucido"
- 2012: "Io non-sono partito" (featuring Steve Forest)
- 2012: "Se il mondo fosse" (featuring Emis Killa, Club Dogo & Marracash)
- 2014: "Uno di quei giorni" (featuring Nina Zilli)
- 2015: "Il bello d'esser brutti"
- 2015: "Maria Salvador" (featuring Il Cile)
- 2015: "Miss & Mr Hide"
- 2015: "La tangenziale" (featuring Elio)
- 2015: "Intro" (featuring Bianca Atzei)
- 2016: "Vorrei ma non posto" with Fedez
- 2016: "Assenzio" with Fedez featuring Stash and Levante
- 2017: "Piccole cose" with Fedez featuring Alessandra Amoroso
- 2017: "Senza pagare" with Fedez featuring T-Pain
- 2018: "Italiana" with Fedez
- 2018: "Tutto tua madre"
- 2019: "Timberland Pro"
- 2019: "Ostia Lido"
- 2020: "La mia hit" (featuring Max Pezzali)

== Awards ==
- 1995: Un disco per l'estate
- 2007: MTV Europe Music Awards: Best Italian Act
- 2010: TRL Awards 2010: TRL History
- 2012: MTV Hip Hop Awards: Best Live
- 2012: MTV Hip Hop Awards: Best Collaboration

== Books ==
- I pensieri di nessuno, 1998, Ricordi-Publication.
- Tutta scena, 2012, TV Sorrisi e Canzoni.
- Axforismi, 2014, Feltrinelli.
- Imperfetta forma, 2016, Mondadori.

== Filmography ==
=== Films ===
Year	Title	Role	Notes
2001	Without Filter	Nico	Feature film debut; leading role
2004	Natale a casa Deejay	Dik Dickens #01	Cameo appearance
2015	Numero zero - Alle origini del rap italiano	Himself	Documentary film
2016	Zeta - Una storia Hip Hop	Himself	Cameo appearance
2017	Cars 3	Speaker Thunder Hollow (voice)	Italian dub; voice role
2019	Appena un minuto	Himself	Cameo appearance
2019	Playmobil: The Movie	Emperor Maximus (voice)	Italian dub; voice role

=== Television ===
Year	Title	Role	Notes
2010	2010 TRL Awards	Presenter	Annual ceremony
2012	MTV Spit	Judge	Season 1
2014–2015; 2018	The Voice of Italy	Coach	Seasons 2–3; 5
2015	Sorci verdi	Host	Variety show
2016	Amici di Maria De Filippi	Coach	Blue team
2018	Il Supplente	Himself	Episode: "Second episode"
2019–present	All Together Now	Judge	
